= List of airline codes (A) =

This is a list of all airline codes. The table lists the IATA airline designators, the ICAO airline designators and the airline call signs (telephony designator). Historical assignments are also included for completeness.

== Codes ==
Airline codes
IATA	ICAO	Airline	Call sign	Country	Comments
DM	DWI	Arajet	Arajet	Dominican Republic	
	GBT	A-Jet Aviation Aircraft Management	GLOBETROTTER	Austria	
	AJR	A-Jet Aviation Company	JET MONGOLIA	Mongolia	
	SFM	A-Safar Air Services	AIR SAFAR	Nigeria	
	AJJ	A2 Jet Leasing	ATLANTIC JET	United States	
	XXV	AASANA		Bolivia	
	BBE	Ababeel Aviation	BABEL AIR	Sudan	
1B		Abacus International		Singapore	Computer reservation system
BJ	ABJ	Abaeté Linhas Aéreas	ABAETE	Brazil	defunct
	NKP	Abakan Air	ABAKAN AIR	Russia	2014
RL	ABG	Abakan-Avia	ROYAL FLIGHT	Russia	
	ABE	Aban Air	ABAN	Iran	Former IATA code: K5
	MRP	Abas	ABAS	Czech Republic	
	AHU	ABC Air Hungary	ABC HUNGARY	Hungary	defunct
	FTY	ABC Bedarfsflug	FLY TYROL	Austria	
W9	AAB	Abelag Aviation	ABG	Belgium	defunct
	BDV	Aberdair Aviation	ABERDAV	Kenya	
	ROH	Aberdair Aviation Ghana		Ghana	
	ADJ	Abidjan Air Cargo	ABICAR	Côte d'Ivoire	defunct
	ABP	ABS Jets	BAIR	Czech Republic	Named changed from Aba Air
M3	LTG	ABSA Cargo	Tam Cargo	Brazil	
	TTN	Absolute Flight Services	TITANIUM	South Africa	
GB	ABX	ABX Air	ABEX	United States	August 15, 2003 Air operations of former Airborne Express
	IAE	AC Insat-Aero		Russia	defunct
	NCL	ACA (Ancargo Air)	ANCARGO AIR	Angola	defunct
	ACD	Academy Airlines	ACADEMY	United States	
ZA	CYD	AccessAir	CYCLONE	United States	defunct
		Ace Air	ACE TAXI	South Korea	defunct as of September 2015
	CFM	ACEF	ACEF	Portugal	Transportes Aéreos e Cargas, code no longer allocated
	ARO	Acero Taxi	ACERO	Mexico	
VX	AES	ACES Colombia	ACES	Colombia	defunct
	BVR	ACM Air Charter	BAVARIAN	Germany	
	BJT	ACM Aviation	BAY JET	United States	
	CRV	Acropolis Aviation	ACROPOLIS	United Kingdom	
	ORS	Action Air	AVIATION SERVICE	Italy	ICAO Code no longer allocated, defunct
	AXQ	Action Airlines (Action Air Charter)	ACTION AIR	United States	
	AVR	Active Aero Charter, Inc.	ACTIVE AERO	United States	
	RRM	Acvila Air-Romanian Carrier	AIR ROMANIA	Romania	defunct
	ADC	AD Astra Executive Charter	AD ASTRA	Poland	
	VUE	AD Aviation	FLIGHTVUE	United Kingdom	
	ADE	Ada Air	ADA AIR	Albania	defunct, former IATA code: ZY
KI	DHI	Adam Air	ADAM SKY	Indonesia	defunct
Z7*	ADK	ADC Airlines	ADCO	Nigeria	defunct; former name: Aviation Development Company
	ADW	ADC Airways		Lebanon	defunct
	DSC	Addis Air Cargo Services	ADDIS CARGO	Ethiopia	
	DDS	Addis Airlines	ADDIS LINE	Ethiopia	DEFUNCT
	ADF	Ade, Aviación Deportiva	ADE AVIACION	Spain	
	TEC	ADI Shuttle Group	TECHJET	United States	
	SWH	Adler Aviation	SHOCKWAVE	Canada	
JP	ADR	Adria Airways	ADRIA	Slovenia	defunct as of September 2019
	DRO	Adro Servicios Aereos	ADRO SERVICIOS	Mexico	
	ADV	Advance Air Charters	ADVANCE	Canada	defunct
	AXX	Advance Air Luftfahrtgesellschaft	SKY SHUTTLE	Germany	
	AAX	Advance Aviation	ADVANCE AVIATION	Thailand	
	XTJ	Advance Aviation Services		United States	
4G*		Advance Leasing Company		United States	
AN	WSN	Advanced Air	WINGSPAN	United States	2015
	ADD	Advanced Air Co.		Japan	ICAO Code no longer allocated
	ADV	Advanced Flight Training	ADVANCED	United Kingdom	
	RDD	Adygea Airlines	ADLINES	Russia	defunct
	DVN	Adventia		Spain	
	EBS	AEG Aviation Services		United States	
A3	AEE	Aegean Airlines	AEGEAN	Greece	
	ALS	Aeralp	AERALP	France	
	AEF	Aerea		Spain	
	DRD	Aereo Dorado	AEREO DORADO	Mexico	
	FUT	Aereo Futuro	AEREO FUTURO	Mexico	
	MMG	Aereo Ruta Maya	RUTA MAYA	Guatemala	
	AGI	Aereo Transportes Los Angeles de America	ANGELES AMERICA	Mexico	
	WWG	Aereo WWG	AERO-W	Mexico	
	AED	Aernord	Aernspa	Italy	defunct
	AKR	Aero Clinker	AERO CLINKER	Mexico	
	RRB	Aero Club de Castellon		Spain	
9D	CND	Aero Continente Dominicana	CONDOMINICANA	Dominican Republic	defunct
	ARP	Aero Corporate	IVORYCORP	Côte d'Ivoire	
ML	AEK	Aero Costa Rica	ACORISA	Costa Rica	defunct
	EPU	Aero Elite Acapulco	ELITACAPULCO	Mexico	
	XPN	Aero Express		Niger	
	AJP	Aero Jets Corporativos	AEROJETS	Mexico	
VF	TKJ	AJet	ANATOLIAN	Turkey	formerly AnadoluJet
	OWN	Aero Owen	AERO OWEN	Mexico	2014
	GHM	Aero Service Bolivia		Bolivia	
	GLM	Aero Services Mali	GLOBAL MALI	Mali	
	GUE	Aero Servicio Guerrero	AERO GUERRERO	Mexico	
	ASR	Aero Sotravia	SOTRAVIA	France	2014
	ABA	Aero-Beta	AEROBETA	Germany	
DW	UCR	Aero-Charter Ukraine	CHARTER UKRAINE	Ukraine	
	EAP	Aero-Pyrenees	AERO-PYRENEES	France	
	AJH	Aeroaljarafe	ALJARAFE	Spain	
	AOB	Aerocaribe Coro	CARIBE CORO	Venezuela	
	CRN	Aero Caribbean	AEROCARIBBEAN	Cuba	Merged into Cubana de Aviación in 2015
	ACR	Aerocenter, Escuela de Formación de Pilotos Privados de Avión	AEROCENTER	Spain	
	ERC	Aerocharter		Guatemala	defunct
	BSO	Aeroclub Barcelona-Sabadell		Spain	
	NVA	Aeroclub de Albacete		Spain	
	LUE	Aeroclub de Alicante		Spain	
	MLL	Aeroclub de Mallorca	MALLORCA	Spain	
	AVX	Aeroclub de Vitoria		Spain	
	CTD	Aerocorporativos	AEROCORPORATIVOS	Mexico	
	RRO	Aerocredo		Russia	
	DVI	Aerodavinci	AERO DAVINCI	Mexico	
	FAQ	Aerofaq		Ecuador	
SU	AFL	Aeroflot	AEROFLOT	Russia	
P3	PLS	Aeroflot-Plus	AEROPLUS	Russia	
	AEG	Aerofumigaciones Sam	FUMIGACIONES SAM	Chile	defunct
	AGQ	Aerogala	GALASERVICE	Chile	defunct
	ARH	Aerohelicopteros	AEROHELCA	Venezuela	2014
	BJU	AeroJet	JET EXPRESS	Angola	
	ARJ	Aerojet de Costa Rica, S.A.		Costa Rica	
	LFT	Aerolift Company	LIFTCO	Sierra Leone	defunct
	LIN	Aerolimousine	AEROLIMOUSINE	Russia	
	PCP	Aerolínea Principal Chile	PRINCIPAL	Chile	
	ALT	Aerolíneas Centrales	AERLINEAS CENTRALES	Mexico	
	AHL	Aerolíneas Hidalgo	HIDALGO	Mexico	
	APR	Aerolíneas Primordiales	AEROPERLAS	Mexico	
	LDL	Aerologic		Russia	
	VSC	Aeronautic de Los Pirineos		Spain	
	PSE	Aeroservicio Sipse	SIPSE	Mexico	
	PSL	Aeroservicios Corporativos De San Luis	CORSAN	Mexico	
	EAE	Aeroservicios Ecuatorianos	AECA	Ecuador	
	AES	Aerosur Paraguay	AEROPARAGUAY	Paraguay	
	BTS	Aerotaxis Albatros	AEROLINEAS ALBATROS	Mexico	
	PRI	Aerotransportes Privados	AEROPRIV	Mexico	ICAO code in use by another company, call sign no longer allocated
	PVA	Aerotransportes Privados	TRANSPRIVADO	Mexico	
	VMX	Aeroventas de Mexico	VENTA	Mexico	2014
	ABU	Aerovías Bueno	AEROBUENO	Colombia	defunct
	ACB	African Cargo Services	AFRICARGO	Kenya	
	AAP	Arabasco Air Services	ARABASCO	Saudi Arabia	
	AAR	Americ Air	PATRIOT	United States	defunct
	AAS	Airtransservice	Aviaservice	Russia	defunct
	AAS	Austrian Air Services	AIR SERVICES	Austria	defunct
OB	AAT	Austrian Airtransport	AUSTRIAN CHARTER	Austria	defunct; former IATA code: U8, OG; former ICAO code: AUC
	AAV	Aly Aviation		United Kingdom	defunct; former ICAO code: AAY
	AAW	Austin Airways	AUSTIN	Canada	defunct
SM	AAW	Allied Airways		United Kingdom	defunct, taken over by British European Airways which went on to form British Airways.
	AAW	Almeta Air	ALMETA AIR	Austria	defunct
KJ	AAZ	Asian Air		Kyrgyzstan	
	ABT	Ambeo	AMBITION	United Kingdom	
	ABE	Arberia Airlines	ARBERIA AIRLINES	Albania	defunct
	ACE	Air Charter Express		Ghana	
YE	ACQ	Aryan Cargo Express		India	
	ACS	Aircraft Sales and Services	AIRCRAFT SALES	Pakistan	
	ABS	Air Central	AIR CENTRAL	United States	defunct
	ADT	Arrendaminetos y Transportes Turisticos	ARRENDA-TRANS	Mexico	
	ADZ	Avio Delta		Bulgaria	
	AED	Aie Experience Flight	AIE EXPERIENCE	United Kingdom	defunct
VJ	AFF	Africa Airways	AFRIWAYS	Benin	defunct
	AFM	AEROSPEED FORMATION ET MAINTENANCE	EPIC AIR	France	
	LBR	Air Costa (Lepl Project Limited)		India	defunct
QH	FLA	Air Florida	PALM	United States	relaunching
3O	MAC	Air Arabia Maroc	ARABIA MAROC	Morocco	This ICAO designator was previously used by Malta Air Charter
	MRY	Air Marine	AIR MARINE	France	
	PNK	Air Pink	AIRPINK	Serbia	
	PXG	Aitheras Aviation Group		United States	
	AFN	African International Airlines	SIMBA	Lesotho	
HD	ADO	AIRDO	AIR DO	Japan	
	ACC	Airspeed Charter		Jamaica	2014
	PNX	AIS Airlines	SPINNER	Netherlands	
	AVD	Álamo Aviación, S.L.	ALAMO	Spain	
	FSY	Algonquin Airlink	FROSTY	Canada	2014
	TTX	Alliance Air Charters	TWISTER	United States	
UJ	LMU	AlMasria Universal Airlines	ALMASRIA	Egypt	
	ALN	Alpha Jet, S.R.O.	TOLEMAC	Slovakia	2014
	APN	Alpine Airlines	AIR ALPES	France	
	BAH	The Amiri Flight	BAHRAIN	Bahrain	
A2	AWG	Animawings	ANIMA WINGS	Romania	
	TLB	Atlantique Air Assistance	TRIPLE-A	France	
	UJX	Atlas Ukraine Airlines	ATLAS UKRAINE	Ukraine	2014
	AGM	Aviation West Charters	ANGEL MED	United States	2015
X9	NVD	Avion Express	NORDVIND	Lithuania	Name changed from Nordic Solutions Air
	AZB	Azamat	TUMARA	Kazakhstan	defunct
3S*	AEN	Aeroland Airways	AEROLAND	Greece	defunct, ICAO code no longer allocated
	NGF	Air Charity Network	ANGEL FLIGHT	United States	Re-allocated in 2014 was used by Angel Flight America
	WFT	Aircharters Worldwide	WORLD FLIGHT	United States	Allocated 2014
JU	ASL	Air Serbia	AIR SERBIA	Serbia	Name changed from Aeroput to JAT Yugoslav Airlines to Jat Airways to Air Serbia. Formerly used JAT as ICAO code.
QH	LYN	Air Kyrgyzstan	ALTYN AVIA	Kyrgyzstan	Name changed from Kyrgyzstan
XK	CCM	Air Corsica	CORSICA	France	
	AHS	AHS Air International	HIGH SKY	Pakistan	
	ROO	Aero Roa	AERO ROA	Mexico	
	AWF	Aeroforward		United States	
	SUP	Aeronautical Charters	SUN SPEED	United States	
	PSO	Aerotaxis Pegaso	AEROPEGASO	Mexico	
EI	EIN	Aer Lingus	SHAMROCK	Ireland	
EG	EUK	Aer Lingus UK	GREEN FLIGHT	United Kingdom	
	VLB	Air Volta	VOLTA	Bulgaria	
	FCJ	AirSprint US	FRACJET	United States	Previously used code "HAB"
	TEW	Airteam Charter	TEAMWORK	South Africa	
	STT	Alpha Star Charter	STAR CHARTER	Saudi Arabia	
	LBZ	Angkasa Super Service		Indonesia	
	HEZ	Arrow Aviation	ARROW	Israel	
	UAH	Air Experience Flight, Cranwell		United Kingdom	Royal Air Force
	RVQ	Aero Jet International	REVA AIR	United States	
	ASK	Aerosky	MULTISKY	Spain	
	AEH	Aero4m	AEROCUTTER	Slovenia	
	ERO	Aeroecom	AEROECOM	Venezuela	
A8	XAU	Aerolink Uganda	PEARL	Uganda	
	NKY	Aeromonkey	AEROMON	Mexico	
	AWP	Aeroworld Pakistan		Pakistan	
	AGA	AG Air	GEOLINE	Georgia	
	ABZ	Air Ambulance Services	ISLAND LIFEFLIGHT	Bahamas	
RV	ROU	Air Canada Rouge	ROUGE	Canada	
	CNM	Air China Inner Mongolia	MENGYUAN	China	
	VRE	Air Côte d'Ivoire	COTE DIVORIE	Ivory Coast	
	AWL	Air Walser		Malta	
	AXY	Air X Charter	LEGEND	Malta	
	OES	ART Aviation	ART AUSTRIA	Austria	
	ASF	Austrian Air Force	AUSTRIAN AIRFORCE	Austria	
	AVG	Aviation Legacy	AVILEF	Gambia	
7A	AZY	Aztec Worldwide Airlines	AZTEC WORLD	United States	
6U	ACX	Air Cargo Germany	LOADMASTER	Germany	defunct
	AAD	Aero Aviation Centre Ltd.	SUNRISE	Canada	Ceased operations 1995
	SII	Aero Servicios Ejecutivos Internacionales	ASEISA	Mexico	
	BZS	Aero Biniza	BINIZA	Mexico	
		Aero Comondu	AERO COMONDU	Mexico	
	AET	Aero-Palma	AERO PALMA	Spain	defunct
	ABM	Aero Albatros	ALBATROS ESPANA	Spain	
ZI	AAF	Aigle Azur	AIGLE AZUR	France	Former name: Lucas Aigle Azur; former IATA code: LK
	AAM	Aim Air		Moldova	
	AAO	Atlantis Airlines (USA)	ATLANTIS AIR	United States	
	AAP	Aerovista Airlines	AEROVISTA GROUP	Kyrgyzstan	defunct
AE	AE	Air Ceylon	CEYLON	Sri Lanka	defunct
4K*	AAS	Askari Aviation	AL-ASS	Pakistan	
	AAU	Australia Asia Airlines	AUSTASIA	Australia	Subsidiary merged into Qantas; former IATA code: IM
	AAV	Astro Air International	ASTRO-PHIL	United States	
8U	AAW	Afriqiyah Airways	AFRIQIYAH	Libya	
Q9	AFU	Afrinat International Airlines	AFRINAT	Gambia	defunct, ICAO code no longer allocated
	AAX	Afric'air Express	AFREX	Côte d'Ivoire	defunct
	BRL	Air Brasd'or	BRASD'OR	Canada	
	AFH	Air Fecteau	FECTO	Canada	defunct
	BRM	Air 500	BOOMERANG	Canada	defunct
	AAG	Atlantic Flight Training	ATLANTIC	United Kingdom	Changed from Air Atlantique in 2014
KI	AAG	Air Atlantique	ATLANTIC	United Kingdom	Former name: Atlantic Air Transport; former IATA codes: 7M, DG, transferred to Atlantic Flight Training in 2014.
QB	AAJ	Air Alma	AIR ALMA	Canada	Ceased operations 10/01/2002; former IATA code: 4L
	ACS	Air Cess		Liberia	defunct
	ADT	Air Dorval	AIR DORVAL	Canada	defunct
	AHN	Air Hungaria	AIR HUNGARIA	Hungary	
	AHR	Air Adriatic	ADRIATIC	Croatia	defunct
LD	AHK	Air Hong Kong	AIR HONG KONG	Hong Kong	
	AHS	Air Viggi San Raffaele	AIRSAR	Italy	
	AAI	Air Aurora	BOREALIS	United States	Former IATA code: AX
	ACU	Air Cargo Transportation System	AFRISPIRIT	Kenya	
	ACV	Air Charter Service		United Kingdom	ICAO code no longer allocated
	ADC	Air Atlantic Dominicana	ATLAN-DOMINICAN	Dominican Republic	defunct
2Y	ADW	Air Andaman	AIR ANDAMAN	Thailand	defunct 2004
UX	AEA	Air Europa	EUROPA	Spain	
	AEQ	Air Express	LUNA	Sweden	
IG	AEY	Air Italy	AIR ITALY	Italy	merged into Meridiana
	ASW	Air Southwest Ltd.	AIRSOUTHWEST	Canada	defunct
	ASX	Air Special	AIRSPEC	Czech Republic	
NX	AMU	Air Macau	AIR MACAO	Macao	
6A	AMW	Armenia Airways	ARMENIA	Armenia	
HM	SEY	Air Seychelles	SEYCHELLES	Seychelles	
	SFB	Air Sofia	AIR SOFIA	Bulgaria	defunct
	BRF	Air Bravo	AIR BRAVO	Uganda	
AF	AFR	Air France	AIRFRANS	France	
	ACG	Air Partner	AIR PARTNER	United Kingdom	
SB	ACI	Air Caledonie International	AIRCALIN	France	
	VSG	AirClass Airways	VISIG	Spain	formerly Visig Operaciones Aéreas
EH	AKX	Air Nippon Network Co. Ltd.	ALFA WING	Japan	merged into ANA Wings
	ALM	Air ALM	ANTILLEAN	Netherlands Antilles	defunct
	ALN	Air Lincoln	CHICAGO LINCOLN	United States	
	ACM	Air Caledonia	WEST CAL	Canada	
ED	AXE	AirExplore	GALILEO	Slovakia	
	AGM	Air Guam	AIR GUAM	United States	
ZW	AWI	Air Wisconsin	WISCONSIN	United States	
	ALU	Air Luxor STP	LUXORJET	São Tomé and Príncipe	
YI	RSI	Air Sunshine	AIR SUNSHINE	United States	
GN	AGN	Air Gabon	GOLF NOVEMBER	Gabon	defunct
9T	RUN	Air ACT	CARGO TURK	Turkey	
	AFV	Air Afrique Vacancies	AFRIQUE VACANCE	Côte d'Ivoire	
ZB	ABN	Air Albania	AIR ALBANIA	Albania	
3J	AAQ	Air Alliance	LIAISON	Canada	defunct
WP	ATW	Air Antwerp	DEVIL	Belgium	defunct
BX	ABL	Air Busan	AIR BUSAN	South Korea	
	ACH	Air Cargo Plus	AIR PLUS	Liberia	
	AAT	Air Central Asia		Kyrgyzstan	
LB	LEP	Air Costa	LECOSTA	India	
	AFS	Air Data		United Kingdom	
GL	GRL	Air Greenland	GREENLAND	Greenland	
3S	GUY	Air Guyane Express	GREEN BIRD	French Guiana	
	AHO	Air Hamburg	AIR HAMBURG	Germany	
NQ	AJX	Air Japan	AIR JAPAN	Japan	
IJ	LIB	Air Liberté	LIBERTE	France	defunct
TT	KLA	Air Lithuania	KAUNAS	Lithuania	defunct
QM	AIM	Air Malawi	MALAWI	Malawi	defunct
L6	AMI	Air Maldives	AIR MALDIVES	Maldives	defunct
ML	BIE	Air Mediterranee	MEDITERRANEE	France	defunct
P8	MKG	Air Mekong	MEKONG	Vietnam	defunct
	AMG	Air Minas Linhas Aéreas	AIR MINAS	Brazil	defunct
4O	MNE	Air Montenegro	MOUNT EAGLE	Montenegro	
	TAH	Air Moorea	AIR MOOREA	France	defunct
	ANV	Air Nevada	AIR NEVADA	United States	
NZ	ANZ	Air New Zealand	NEW ZEALAND	New Zealand	"NZ" used by New Zealand National Airways Corporation until its merger with Air New Zealand in 1978 "TE" used by TEAL from 1940-1965, then Air New Zealand from 1965-1990
4N	ANT	Air North Charter - Canada	AIR NORTH	Canada	
	AOE	Air One Executive		Italy	
	AEI	Air Poland	POLISH BIRD	Poland	defunct
YP	APZ	Air Premia	AIR PREMIA	South Korea	
	AVZ	Air Valencia	AIR VALENCIA	Spain	
	AMO	Air Montreal (Air Holdings Inc.)	AIR MONTREAL	Canada	
BM		Air Sicilia		Italy	defunct
	AMR	Air Specialties Corporation	AIR AM	United States	Air American, Total Air
	AMS	Air Muskoka	AIR MUSKOKA	Canada	
	AOJ	Avcon Jet	ASTERIX	Austria	
	AJU	Air Jetsul	AIRJETSUL	Portugal	
	AKA	Air Korea Co. Ltd.		Republic of Korea	
	LIV	Air Livonia	LIVONIA	Estonia	defunct
ZX	ABL	Air BC	AIRCOACH	Canada	Merged into Air Canada Jazz
	ABN	Air Fret Senegal		Senegal	
	LJA	Air Jamahiriya Company	AIR JAMAHIRIYA	Libya	ICAO code no longer allocated
G8	AGB	Air Service Gabon		Gabon	defunct
7T	AGV	Air Glaciers	AIR GLACIERS	Switzerland	
	MVM	Air Cargo America	PEGASUS	United States	
	AMY	Air Ambar	AIR AMBAR	Dominican Republic	
6V	VGA	Air Vegas	AIR VEGAS	United States	defunct
	AOU	Air Tractor	AIR TRACTOR	Croatia	
	APA	Air Park Aviation Ltd.	CAN-AM	Canada	
	APG	Air People International	AIR PEOPLE	Thailand	
NH	ANA	All Nippon Airways	ALL NIPPON	Japan	
	ANB	Air Navigation And Trading Co. Ltd.	AIR NAV	United Kingdom	Former ICAO code: AAT
	NGO	Air-Angol	AIR ANGOL	Angola	
TZ	TWG	air-taxi Europe	TWINGOOSE	Germany	
	NGP	Air Nigeria	REGAL EAGLE	Nigeria	defunct
2Q	SNC	Air Cargo Carriers	NIGHT CARGO	United States	
	SND	Air Samarkand	ARSAM	Uzbekistan	
V7	SNG	Air Senegal International	AIR SENEGAL	Senegal	defunct
	SNY	Air Sandy	AIR SANDY	Canada	
	AII	Air Integra	INTEGRA	Canada	
	BFF	Air Baffin	AIR BAFFIN	Canada	renamed to Air Nunavut
	BDM	Air Bandama	BANDAMA	Ivory Coast	
AB	BER	Air Berlin	AIR BERLIN	Germany	defunct
	ABT	Air Brousse	AIR BROUSSE	Canada	defunct
	APV	Air Plan International	AIR PLAN	Democratic Republic of the Congo	
	ARX	Air Xpress, Inc.	AIREX	United States	
	HTT	Air Tchad	HOTEL TANGO	Chad	
	ARZ	Air Resorts	AIR RESORTS	United States	
	ASB	Air-Spray 1967 Ltd.	AIR SPRAY	Canada	
	ASC	Air Star Corporation	AIR STAR	Canada	
4D	ASD	Air Sinai	AIR SINAI	Egypt	
	AQN	Air Queensland	BUSHAIR	Australia	defunct
	ARC	Air Routing International Corp.		United States	
QN	ARR	Air Armenia	AIR ARMENIA	Armenia	
	AIL	Air Illinois	AIR ILLINOIS	United States	defunct
AI	AIC	Air India Limited	AIRINDIA	India	
	AIG	Air Inter Gabon		Gabon	
PJ	SPM	Air Saint Pierre	SAINT-PIERRE	France	
SZ	WOW	Air Southwest	SWALLOW	United Kingdom	defunct
	ATJ	Air Traffic GmbH	SNOOPY	Germany	
8C	ATN	Air Transport International	AIR TRANSPORT	United States	
	ATQ	Air Transport Schiphol	MULTI	Netherlands	
	ATS	Air Transport Service		Democratic Republic of the Congo	
	AVG	Air Falcon	DJIBOUTI FALCON	Djibouti	
	AUX	Air Uganda International Ltd.		Uganda	
NF	AVN	Air Vanuatu	AIR VAN	Vanuatu	
ZB	BUB	Air Bourbon	BOURBON	Reunion	defunct
CC	ABD	Air Atlanta Icelandic	ATLANTA	Iceland	
3H	AIE	Air Inuit	AIR INUIT	Canada	
	AIS	Air Sureste	SURESTE	Spain	
RB	SBK	Air Srpska	Air Srpska	Bosnia and Herzegovina	defunct
TN	THT	Air Tahiti Nui	TAHITI AIRLINES	France	
SW	NMB	Air Namibia	NAMIBIA	Namibia	defunct
	NSK	Air Intersalonika	INTERSALONIKA	Greece	
	NTL	Air Anatolia	AIR ANATOLIA	Turkey	defunct
	SGA	Air Saigon	AIR SAIGON	Vietnam	
	AFW	Afrique Regional Airways	AFRAIR	Côte d'Ivoire	defunct
AW	AFW	Africa World Airlines	BLACKSTAR	Ghana	
	ACX	Air Charters	PARAIR	Canada	defunct
PE	AEL	Air Europe Italy	AIR EUROPE	Italy	defunct
JM	AJM	Air Jamaica	JAMAICA	Jamaica	merged into Caribbean Airlines; ICAO and IATA codes no longer used.
	AWN	Air Niamey	AIR NIAMEY	Niger	
	AWT	Air West	AIR WEST	Canada	
6G	AWW	Air Wales	RED DRAGON	United Kingdom	defunct, ICAO code no longer allocated
TX	FWI	Air Caraïbes	FRENCH WEST	France	
IX	AXB	Air India Express	EXPRESS INDIA	India	
	AXD	Air Express	AIR SUDEX	Sudan	
	BSB	Air Wings	ARBAS	Moldova	
BT	BTI	Air Baltic	AIRBALTIC	Latvia	
	ANI	Air Atlantic (Nig) Limited	NIGALANTIC	Nigeria	
EL	ANK	Air Nippon	ANK AIR	Japan	merged into All Nippon Airways, ICAO code no longer allocated
YW	ANE	Air Nostrum	AIR NOSTRUM	Spain	
PX	ANG	Air Niugini	NIUGINI	Papua New Guinea	
G9	ABY	Air Arabia	ARABIA	United Arab Emirates	
AC	ACA	Air Canada	AIR CANADA	Canada	
AP	LAV	AlbaStar	ALBASTAR	Spain	
E9	MHS	Air Memphis	AIR MEMPHIS	Egypt	defunct
XT	AXL	Air Exel	EXEL COMMUTER	Netherlands	defunct
	AZF	Air Zermatt AG	AIR ZERMATT	Switzerland	
UM	AZW	Air Zimbabwe	AIR ZIMBABWE	Zimbabwe	
	MHU	Air Memphis	MEPHIS UGANDA	Uganda	
	MKH	Air Marrakech Service	AIR MARRAKECH	Morocco	
	AZX	Air Max Africa	AZIMA	Gabon	defunct
S2	RSH	Air Sahara	SAHARA	India	renamed to Jetlite
	ATA	Air Transport Association		United States	
TC	ATC	Air Tanzania	TANZANIA	Tanzania	
	XAC	Air Charter World		United States	
2J	VBW	Air Burkina	BURKINA	Burkina Faso	
	ATH	Air Travel Corp.	AIR TRAVEL	United States	
KM	AMC	Air Malta	AIR MALTA	Malta	
YT	TGA	Air Togo	AIR TOGO	Togo	defunct
	ASJ	Air Satellite	SATELLITE	Canada	defunct
	ASN	Air and Sea Transport		Russia	
	ASS	Air Class, S.A. de C.V.	AIR CLASS	Mexico	
	NPL	Air Nepal International	AIR NEPAL	Nepal	defunct
	NPR	Air Napier		New Zealand	defunct
	WAM	Air Taxi & Cargo	TAXI CARGO	Sudan	
	RSM	Air Somalia	AIR SOMALIA	Somali Republic	
	AWZ	AirWest		Sudan	
G4	AAY	Allegiant Air	ALLEGIANT	United States	
	AAZ	Angus Aviation	ANGUS	Canada	defunct
	ABA	Artem-Avia	ARTEM-AVIA	Ukraine	defunct
	ABB	African Business and Transportations	AFRICAN BUSINESS	Democratic Republic of the Congo	
	ABF	Aerial Oy	SKYWINGS	Finland	
	ABK	Alberta Citylink	ALBERTA CITYLINK	Canada	defunct, ICAO code no longer allocated
	ABO	APSA Colombia	AEROEXPRESO	Colombia	aka Aeroexpreso Bogota
O4	ABV	Antrak Air	ANTRAK	Ghana	
GB	ABX	Airborne Express	ABEX	United States	August 14, 2003 merged into DHL
	ABZ	ATA Brasil	ATA-BRAZIL	Brazil	defunct
	ACC	Avcard Services		United Kingdom	ICAO code no longer allocated
	ACY	Atlas Cargo Airlines	ATLAS CARGOLINES	Morocco	
	ADA	Airservices Australia	AUSCAL	Australia	Flight Inspection Unit
8T	TID	Air Tindi	TINDI	Canada	
	ADB	Antonov Airlines	ANTONOV BUREAU	Ukraine	Antonov Design Bureau
	ADG	Aerea Flying Training Organization	AEREA TRAINING	Spain	
	ADI	Audeli Air	AUDELI	Spain	
	ADL	Aero Dynamics	COTSWOLD	United Kingdom	
	ADN	Aero-Dienst	AERODIENST	Germany	
	ADP	Aerodiplomatic	AERODIPLOMATIC	Mexico	
3L	ADY	Air Arabia Abu Dhabi	Nawras	United Arab Emirates	
	ADQ	Avion Taxi	AIR DATA	Canada	2695731 Canada Inc.
	ADS	Aviones de Sonora	SONORAV	Mexico	
	ADU	Airdeal Oy	AIRDEAL	Finland	
EM*	AEB	Aero Benin	AEROBEN	Benin	defunct
	AEC	Aerocésar	AEROCESAR	Colombia	defunct; aka Aerovías del César
	AED	Aerotrans Airlines		Russia	defunct
	ADX	Anderson Aviation	ANDAX	United States	
	AEI	Aeroexpreso Interamericano	INTERAM	Colombia	defunct
	AEJ	Air Express	KHAKI EXPRESS	Tanzania	
	AEK	Aerocon	AEROCON	Bolivia	
	AEM	Aero Madrid	AEROMADRID	Spain	
KD	AEN	Air Enterprise	AIR ENTERPRISE	France	defunct
	AEO	Aeroservicios Ejecutivos Del Occidente	AERO OCCIDENTE	Mexico	
	AEP	Aerotec Escuela de Pilotos	AEROTEC	Spain	
AX	AAC	AmericanConnection	CONNECT AMERICA	United States	defunct
AN	AAA	Ansett Australia	ANSETT	Australia	defunct
	AAC	Army Air Corps	ARMYAIR	United Kingdom	
5W	AEU	Astraeus	FLYSTAR	United Kingdom	defunct, ICAO code no longer allocated
	AEV	Aeroventas	AEROVENTAS	Mexico	
VV	AEW	Aerosvit Airlines	AEROSVIT	Ukraine	defunct
	AEX	Airway Express	AVCO	United States	ICAO code no longer allocated
	AEZ	Aerial Transit	AERIAL TRANZ	United States	
	AFA	Alfa Air	BLUE ALFA	Czech Republic	
WK	AFB	American Falcon	AMERICAN FALCON	Argentina	defunct
QQ	UTY	Alliance Airlines	UNITY	Australia	
	UVS	Air Universal	UNI-LEONE	Sierra Leone	defunct
	UVT	Auvia Air	AUVIA	Indonesia	
	AFC	African West Air	AFRICAN WEST	Senegal	
	AFE	Airfast Indonesia	AIRFAST	Indonesia	
FG	AFG	Ariana Afghan Airlines	ARIANA	Afghanistan	
RV*	AFI	Africaone	AFRICAWORLD	The Gambia	
Y2	AFJ	Alliance Air	JAMBO	Uganda	Ceased operations 08/10/2000
	AFK	Africa Air Links	AFRICA LINKS	Sierra Leone	
	AFO	Aero Empresa Mexicana	AERO EMPRESA	Mexico	
	AFQ	Alba Servizi Aerotrasporti	ALBA	Italy	
5Z	AFX	Airfreight Express		United Kingdom	Ceased operations 08/03/2002
	AFY	Africa Chartered Services	AFRICA CHARTERED	Nigeria	
	AFZ	Africa Freight Services	AFREIGHT	Zambia	
	AGA	Aeronaves Del Centro		Venezuela	
	AGC	Arab Agricultural Aviation Company	AGRICO	Egypt	
	AGF	Atlantic Gulf Airlines	ATLANTIC GULF	United States	defunct
5D	SLI	Aeroméxico Connect	COSTERA	Mexico	
	AGG	Algoma Airways	ALGOMA	Canada	ICAO code no longer allocated
	AGH	Altagna	ALTAGNA	France	
	AGO	Angola Air Charter	ANGOLA CHARTER	Angola	
	AGP	AERFI Group	AIR TARA	Ireland	
1A	AGT	Amadeus IT Group	AMADEUS	Spain	
	AGU	Angara Airlines	SARMA	Russia	
	AGW	Aero Gambia	AERO GAMBIA	Gambia	defunct, ICAO code no longer allocated
JJ	AGX	Aviogenex	GENEX	Serbia	defunct
	BLR	Atlantic Coast Airlines	BLUE RIDGE	United States	defunct
	BLZ	Aero Barloz	AEROLOZ	Mexico	
PL	PLI	Aeroperú	Aeroperu	Peru	defunct
8A	BMM	Atlas Blue	ATLAS BLUE	Morocco	defunct
	BNB	Aero Banobras	AEROBANOBRAS	Mexico	
	AGY	Aero Flight Service	FLIGHT GROUP	United States	
	AGZ	Agrolet-Mci	AGROLET	Slovakia	
GD	AHA	Air Alpha Greenland	AIR ALPHA	Denmark	sold to Air Greenland
	AHC	Azal Avia Cargo	AZALAVIACARGO	Azerbaijan	Cargo Airline of the State Concern Azerbaijan Hava
	AHE	Airport Helicopter Basel, Muller & Co.	AIRPORT HELICOPTER	Switzerland	
	CJE	Aeroservices Corporate	BIRD JET	France	
	AHF	Aspen Helicopters	ASPEN	United States	
	AHG	Aerochago Airlines	AEROCHAGO	Dominican Republic	defunct
	AHH	Airplanes Holdings	AIRHOLD	Ireland	
	AHP	Aerochiapas	AEROCHIAPAS	Mexico	
HT	AHW	Aeromist-Kharkiv	AEROMIST	Ukraine	defunct
J2	AHY	Azerbaijan Airlines	AZAL	Azerbaijan	
U3	AIA	Avies	AVIES	Estonia	
4Y	AIB	Airbus Industrie	AIRBUS INDUSTRIE	France	
KJ	AIH	Air Incheon	AIR INCHEON	South Korea	
RS	ASV	Air Seoul	AIR SEOUL	South Korea	
	AIK	African Airlines International Limited	AFRICAN AIRLINES	Kenya	
	AIN	African International Airways	FLY CARGO	Swaziland	
5A	AIP	Alpine Air Express	ALPINE AIR	United States	
	AIU	Alicante Internacional Airlines	ALIA	Spain	
PA	ABQ	Airblue	AIRBLUE	Pakistan	
	THM	Airmark Aviation	THAI AIRMARK	Thailand	
	AIR	Airlift International	AIRLIFT	United States	defunct
	AIT	Airest	AIREST CARGO	Estonia	
	AIV	Airvias S/A Linhas Aéreas	AIRVIAS	Brazil	
W4	BES	Aero Services Executive	BIRD EXPRESS	France	
	AIW	Atlantic Island Airways	TARTAN	Canada	
	AIX	Aircruising Australia	CRUISER	Australia	
	AIY	Aircrew Check and Training Australia	AIRCREW	Australia	
IZ	AIZ	Arkia Israel Airlines	ARKIA	Israel	
	AJA	Afghan Jet International Airlines	AFGHAN JET	Afghanistan	
	AJB	Aero JBR	AERO JBR	Mexico	
	AJE	Aero Jet Express	JET EXPRESS	Mexico	defunct
	AJI	Ameristar Jet Charter	AMERISTAR	United States	
	AJK	Allied Air	BAMBI	Nigeria	
	AJO	Aero Ejecutivo	AEROEXO	Mexico	defunct
	AJS	Aeroejecutivos Colombia	AEROEJECUTIVOS	Colombia	Aeroejecutivos Aeroservicios Ejecutivos
M6	AJT	Amerijet International	AMERIJET	United States	
	AJV	ANA & JP Express	AYJAY CARGO	Japan	merged into Air Japan
	AJW	Alpha Jet International	ALPHAJET	United States	
	AJY	AJet	AYJET	Cyprus	defunct, ICAO code no longer allocated
	AKB	Aktjubavia	KARAB	Kazakhstan	
	AKC	Arca Aerovías Colombianas Ltda.	ARCA	Colombia	
	AKF	Anikay Air Company	ANIKAY	Kyrgyzstan	
	AKH	Akhal	AKHAL	Turkmenistan	
	MNI	Aeromilenio	AEROMIL	Mexico	
	AKK	Aklak Air	AKLAK	Canada	
4A	AKL	Air Kiribati	KIRIBATI	Kiribati	
	AKN	Alkan Air	ALKAN AIR	Canada	
	AKW	Angkor Airways	ANGKORWAYS	Cambodia	defunct
	AKZ	AK Navigator LLC	ABSOLUTE	Kazakhstan	ICAO code no longer allocated
	ALB	Aero Albatros	ALBATROS	Mexico	
	ALD	Albion Aviation	ALBION	United Kingdom	
	ALE	Aeroalas Colombia	AEROALAS	Colombia	defunct
	ALF	Allied Command Europe (Mobile Force)	ACEFORCE	Belgium	
	FYS	American Flyers	AMERICAN FLYERS	United States	
	DFA	Aero Coach Aviation	AERO COACH	United States	
EV	ASQ	Atlantic Southeast Airlines	ACEY	United States	Merged into ExpressJet Airlines
	ALG	Air Logistics	AIRLOG	United States	
	ALL	Aerovallarta	VALLARTA	Mexico	
HP	AWE	America West Airlines	CACTUS	United States	Merged with US Airways
6R	TNO	Aerotransporte de Carga Union	AEROUNION	Mexico	
	TND	Aero Taxis Cessna	TAXIS CESSNA	Mexico	
	TMP	Arizona Express Airlines	TEMPE	United States	
	ALO	Allegheny Commuter Airlines	ALLEGHENY	United States	US Airways Express
	ALP	Allpoints Jet	ALLPOINTS	China	
	ALP	Alpliner AG	ALPINER	Switzerland	Code now allocated to another user
	ALQ	Altair Aviation (1986)	ALTAIR	Canada	
VH	ALV	Aeropostal Alas de Venezuela	AEROPOSTAL	Venezuela	
	ALW	Alas Nacionales, S.A.	ALNACIONAL	Dominican Republic	
	ALY	Alyeska Air Service	ALYESKA	United States	
	ALZ	Alta Flights (Charters) Ltd.		Canada	
	AMA	ATMA	ADIK	Kazakhstan	
	AMD	Aerolíneas Medellín	AEROLINEAS MEDELLIN	Colombia	defunct
	AMF	Ameriflight	AMFLIGHT	United States	
	AMH	Alan Mann Helicopters Ltd.	MANN	United Kingdom	ICAO code no longer allocated
	AMJ	Aviation Amos	AVIATION AMOS	Canada	
	AMK	Amerer Air	AMER AIR	Austria	
	AMM	Aeroputul International Marculesti	AEROM	Moldova	
DP	AMM	Air 2000	JETSET	United Kingdom	defunct
	AMP	Aero Transporte S.A. (ATSA)	ATSA	Peru	
	AMQ	Aeromedicare Ltd.	LIFELINE	United Kingdom	No longer current
	AMQ	Aircraft Management and Consulting	AMEX	Poland	
TZ	AMT	ATA Airlines	AMTRAN	United States	defunct
YJ	AMV	AMC Airlines	AMC AIRLINES	Egypt	Aircraft Maintenance Company
AM	AMX	Aeroméxico	AEROMEXICO	Mexico	
	AMZ	Amiya Airline	AMIYA AIR	Nigeria	
	ANC	Anglo Cargo	ANGLO	United Kingdom	Defunct, ICAO code no longer allocated
	BRP	AeroBratsk	AEROBRA	Russia	
	ANH	Alajnihah for Air Transport	ALAJNIHAH	Libya	
	ANM	Aerotransportacion de Norteamerica	NORAM	Mexico	
	ANM	Antares Airtransport, Maintenance & Service GmbH	ANTARES	Germany	ICAO Code now allocated to another user
TL	ANO	Airnorth	TOPEND	Australia	
	ANQ	Aerolínea de Antioquia	ANTIOQUIA	Colombia	
OY	ANS	Andes Líneas Aéreas	AEROANDES	Argentina	
IW	AOM	AOM French Airlines	French Lines	France	defunct
	ANW	Aviación Del Noroeste, S.A. de C.V.	AVINOR	Mexico	defunct
	SAP	Avia Jaynar	TOBOL	Kazakhstan	
	EMS	Aero Servicios Empresariales	SERVIEMPRESARIAL	Mexico	
	AOA	Alcon Servicios Aéreos, S.A. de C.V.	ALCON	Mexico	
J6	AOC	AVCOM	AERO AVCOM	Russia	
	AOD	Aero Vodochody	AERO CZECH	Czech Republic	
	AOF	Atair Pty Ltd.	ATAIR	South Africa	
2D	AOG	Aero VIP	AVIP	Argentina	defunct
	MUN	Aeromundo Ejecutivo	AEROMUNDO	Mexico	
	MUR	Aerolínea Muri	MURI	Mexico	
	AOI	Astoria, Inc.	ASTORIA	Canada	defunct
	NRO	Aero Rent JSC	AEROMASTER	Russia	defunct
	NRP	Aeronord-Grup	AERONORD	Moldova	
	AOK	Aeroatlantico Colombia		Colombia	defunct
	AOL	Angkor Airlines	ANGKOR AIR	Cambodia	defunct
	AON	Aero Entreprise	AERO ENTERPRISE	France	
	AOO	As, Opened Joint Stock Company	COMPANY AS	Ukraine	
	AOP	Aeropiloto	AEROPILOTO	Portugal	
VB	VIV	Aeroenlaces Nacionales	AEROENLACES	Mexico	Former ICAO code: AEN
	VIZ	Aerovis Airlines	AEROVIZ	Ukraine	
	VJE	AvJet Routing		United Arab Emirates	
	VGF	Aerovista Gulf Express	VISTA GULF	United Arab Emirates	
	VER	Almaver	ALMAVER	Mexico	
	AOR	Afro International Ent. Limited	INTER-AFRO	Nigeria	
	SMX	Alitalia Express	ALIEXPRESS	Italy	
OE	AOT	Asia Overnight Express	ASIA OVERNIGHT	Philippines	
	AOV	Aero Vision	AEROVISION	France	
	AOX	Aerotaxi Del Valle	AEROVALLE	Colombia	
	APC	Airpac Airlines, Inc.	AIRPAC	United States	
	SVM	Aeroservicios Monterrey	SERVIMONTE	Mexico	
	APF	Amapola Flyg AB	AMAPOLA	Sweden	
	APH	Alpha Aviation, Inc.	AIRFLIGHT	United States	
	API	ASA Pesada, Lda.	ASA PESADA	Angola	
	APJ	Peach Aviation	AIR PEACH	Japan	
	PET	Aerotransporte Petrolero	AEROPETRO	Colombia	
GV	ARF	Aero Flight	Aero Fox	Germany	defunct
	BKL	Aircompany Barcol	BARCOL	Russia	
	BLA	All Charter Limited	ALL CHARTER	United Kingdom	ICAO code no longer allocated
	APL	Appalachian Flying Service, Inc.	APPALACHIAN	United States	
	APM	Airpac, Inc.	ALASKA PACIFIC	United States	
	APO	Aeropro	AEROPRO	Canada	defunct
	APP	AlpAvia d.o.o.	ALPAVIA	Slovenia	
	APQ	Aspen Aviation	ASPEN BASE	United States	
	APU	Aeropuma, S.A.	AEROPUMA	El Salvador	
JW	APW	Arrow Air	BIG A	United States	defunct
	APX	Apex Air Cargo	PARCEL EXPRESS	United States	
	APY	APA Internacional	APA INTERNACIONAL	Dominican Republic	
	AQA	Aeroatlas, S.A.	ATCO	Colombia	
	AQL	Aquila Air Ltd.	AQUILA	Canada	
	AQO	Aluminum Company Of America	ALCOA SHUTTLE	United States	Alcoa Aircraft Operations
	AQT	Avioquintana	AVIOQUINTANA	Mexico	
	AQU	AirQuarius Aviation	QUARIUS	South Africa	defunct
	AQZ	Aerodyne Charter Company	QUANZA	United States	
	ARA	Arik Air	ARIK AIR	Nigeria	
	ARB	Avia Air N.V.	AVIAIR	Aruba	
2B	AWT	Albawings	ALBAWINGS	Albania	
4C	ARE	Aires, Aerovías de Integración Regional, S.A.	AIRES	Colombia	renamed to LAN Colombia
AR	ARG	Aerolíneas Argentinas	ARGENTINA	Argentina	
	ARH	Arrowhead Airways	ARROWHEAD	United States	
	ARI	Aero Vics	AEROVICS	Mexico	
	SUN	Antillana De Navegación Aérea		Dominican Republic	
	SUO	Aeroservicios De San Luis	SERVICIO SANLUIS	Mexico	
	SUP	Aerosuper	AEROSUPER	Mexico	
	ARK	Aero Link Air Services S.L.	LINK SERVICE	Spain	
	ARL	Airlec - Air Aquitaine Transport	AIRLEC	France	
	ARM	Aeromarket Express	AMEX	Spain	defunct
	ARO	Arrow Aviation Ltd.	ARROW	Canada	defunct
	KLD	Air Klaipėda	AIR KLAIPEDA	Lithuania	
	ARQ	Armstrong Air, Inc.	ARMSTRONG	Canada	
	ARS	Aeromet Servicios	METSERVICE	Chile	
	ART	Aerotal Aerolíneas Territoriales de Colombia Ltda.	AEROTAL	Colombia	defunct
	ARV	Aravco Ltd.	ARAVCO	United Kingdom	
	ARW	Aria	ARIABIRD	France	
	OST	Airline Alania	ALANIA	Russia	
	HUC	Aerolíneas de Techuacán	LINEAS TEHUACAN	Mexico	
	HUT	Aerotransportes Huitzilin	AEROHUITZILIN	Mexico	
	HUY	Aero Transportes Del Humaya	AERO HUMAYA	Mexico	
	ARY	Argosy Airways	GOSEY	United States	
AS	ASA	Alaska Airlines, Inc.	ALASKA	United States	
PL	ASE	Airstars	MOROZOV	Russia	defunct
	ASF	Air Schefferville, Inc.	SCHEFF	Canada	
	ASG	African Star Airways (PTY) Ltd.	AFRICAN STAR	South Africa	
	ASI	Aerosun International, Inc.	AEROSUN	United States	
	ASM	Awesome Flight Services (PTY) Ltd.	AWESOME	South Africa	
	ASO	Aero Slovakia	AERO NITRA	Slovakia	
	ASP	Airsprint	AIRSPRINT	Canada	
	ASR	All Star Airlines, Inc.	ALL STAR	United States	
	AST	Aerolíneas Del Oeste	AEROESTE	Mexico	
	WAP	Arrow Panama	ARROW PANAMA	Panama	
	ASV	Astravia-Bissau Air Transports Ltd.	ASTRAVIA	Guinea-Bissau	
OB	ASZ	Astrakhan Airlines	AIR ASTRAKHAN	Russia	defunct
	ATB	Atlantair Ltd.	STARLITE	Canada	
	ATD	Aerotours Dominicana	AEROTOURS	Dominican Republic	
	ATE	Atlantis Transportation Services, Ltd.	ATLANTIS CANADA	Canada	
	ATG	Aerotranscargo	MOLDCARGO	Moldova	
HC	ATI	Aero-Tropics Air Services	AEROTROPICS	Australia	defunct
	ATK	AeroTACA	AEROTACA	Colombia	defunct, Aerotaxi Casanare
	ATL	Atlas Air Service AG	AIR BREMEN	Germany	
FO	ATM	Par Avion	AIRTAS	Australia	
	CPV	Air Corporate	AIRCORPORATE	Italy	
	ATP	ASTRAL Colombia - Aerotransportes Especiales Ltda.	ASTRAL	Colombia	
	FEO	Aeroferinco	FERINCO	Mexico	
	FES	Aero Taxis Y Servicios Alfe	AERO ALFE	Mexico	
	FFA	Avialesookhrana	AVIALESOOKHRANA	Russia	
	FFB	Africair Service	FOXTROT FOXTROT	Senegal	
	ATR	Atlas Airlines	ATLAS-AIR	United States	
	ATT	Aer Turas	AERTURAS	Ireland	defunct
	ATU	Atlant Aerobatics Ltd.	ATLANT HUNGARY	Hungary	
	ATV	Avanti Air	AVANTI AIR	Germany	
	ATW	Aero Trades (Western) Ltd.	AERO TRADES	Canada	defunct, ICAO code no longer allocated
OS	AUA	Austrian Airlines	AUSTRIAN	Austria	
IQ	AUB	Augsburg Airways	AUGSBURG-AIR	Germany	defunct
	TUP	Aviastar-Tu	TUPOLEVAIR	Russia	
RU	ABW	AirBridge Cargo	AIRBRIDGE CARGO	Russia	Former IATA: BO
	TUR	ATUR		Ecuador	
	TXU	ATESA Aerotaxis Ecuatorianos	ATESA	Ecuador	
	TXX	Austin Express	COWBOY	United States	defunct
	AUD	Audi Air, Inc.	AUDI AIR	United States	
	AUF	Augusta Air Luftfahrtunternehmen	AUGUSTA	Germany	
	AUM	Air Atlantic Uruguay	ATLAMUR	Uruguay	
	AUN	Aviones Unidos	AVIONES UNIDOS	Mexico	
	AUP	Avia Business Group		Russia	
	SVE	Aero Servicios Expecializados	AEROESPECIAL	Mexico	
GR	AUR	Aurigny Air Services	AYLINE	United Kingdom	
NO	AUS	Aus-Air	AUS-AIR	Australia	defunct
AU	AUT	Austral Líneas Aéreas	AUSTRAL	Argentina	
	AUU	Aurora Aviation, Inc.	AURORA AIR	United States	ICAO code no longer allocated
	AUY	Aerolíneas Uruguayas, S.A.	AUSA	Uruguay	
	AVF	Aviair Aviation Ltd.	CARIBOO	Canada	
	AVH	AV8 Helicopters	KENT HELI	United Kingdom	
	AVJ	Avia Traffic Company	ATOMIC	Kyrgyzstan	
	AVK	AV8 Helicopters	AVIATE-COPTER	South Africa	
	AVM	Aviación Ejecutiva Mexicana, S.A.	AVEMEX	Mexico	
	AVO	Aviation at Work	AVIATION WORK	South Africa	
	AVP	Avcorp Registrations	AVCORP	United Kingdom	No longer used
	AVP	Aviacion Corporativa de Peubla	AVIA PUEBLA	Mexico	
	LFP	Alfa Aerospace	ALFA-SPACE	Australia	
	LFR	Atlantic Airfreight Aviation	LANFREIGHT	São Tomé and Príncipe	
	AVS	Avialsa T-35	AVIALSA	Spain	
	AVT	Asia Avia Airlines	ASIAVIA	Indonesia	defunct
	AVU	Avia Sud Aérotaxi	AVIASUD	France	
	AVV	Airvantage Incorporated	AIRVANTAGE	United States	
	AVW	Aviator Airways	AVIATOR	Greece	
	AVX	Aviapaslauga	PASLAUGA	Lithuania	defunct
	YRG	Air Yugoslavia	YUGAIR	Serbia	defunct; operations continue under Jat Airways
K8	ZAK	Airlink Zambia		Zambia	Zambia Skyways Limited
	ZZM	Agence Nationale des Aerodromes et de la Meteorologie (ANAM)		Ivory Coast	
4Y	BGA	Airbus Transport International	BELUGA	France	
B9	BGD	Air Bangladesh	AIR BANGLA	Bangladesh	defunct
	BGF	Aviodetachment-28	BULGARIAN	Bulgaria	
	BGG	Aero BG	AERO BG	Mexico	
	BHC	Aerotaxis De La Bahia	BAHIA	Mexico	
	BIV	Aviaservice	AVIASERVICE	Georgia	
	SZA	Aerolíneas de El Salvador	AESA	El Salvador	defunct
	AVY	Aerovaradero, S.A.	AEROVARADERO	Cuba	
	AWB	Airways International, Inc.	AIRNAT	United States	
	AWK	Airwork	AIRWORK	New Zealand	
	AWL	Australian Wetleasing	AUSSIEWORLD	Australia	
	AWO	Awood Air Ltd.	AWOOD AIR	Canada	
	AWR	Arctic Wings And Rotors Ltd.	ARCTIC WINGS	Canada	
	ISM	Auo Airclub AIST-M	STORK	Russia	
	AWS	Arab Wings	ARAB WINGS	Jordan	
	AWV	Airwave Transport, Inc.	AIRWAVE	Canada	
	AWY	Aeroway, S.L.	AEROWEE	Spain	
	AXH	Aeromexhaga	AEROMEXHAGA	Mexico	
	AXI	Aeron International Airlines, Inc.	AIR FREIGHTER	United States	
	AXK	African Express Airways	EXPRESS JET	Kenya	Former IATA code: QA; former ICAO code: AEK; former callsign: AFRICAN EXPRESS
AK	AXM	AirAsia	RED CAP	Malaysia	ICAO code no longer allocated
D7	XAX	AirAsia X	XANADU	Malaysia	
DJ	WAJ	AirAsia Japan	WING ASIA	Japan	defunct
I5	IAD	AirAsia India	ARIYA	India	Founded 28. Mar 2013
MY	MWG	AirBorneo	MASWINGS	Malaysia	transitioned from MASwings on 1 January 2026
	AXN	Alexandair	ALEXANDROS	Greece	defunct
	AXP	Aeromax	AEROMAX SPAIN	Spain	
	BNI	Alberni Airways	ALBERNI	Canada	
	BNZ	Aerolíneas Bonanza	AERO BONANZA	Mexico	
	BOC	Aerobona	AEROBONA	Mexico	
	AXR	Axel Rent, S.A.	RENTAXEL	Mexico	
	AXS	Altus Airlines	ALTUS	United States	
	AXV	AVA Airlines	AVA	Iran	
	AXX	Avioimpex A.D.p.o.	IMPEX	Macedonia	defunct
6V	AXY	Axis Airways	AXIS	France	defunct
	AYD	Aladia Airlines	AIRLINES ALADIA	Mexico	defunct
	AYK	Aykavia Aircompany		Armenia	ICAO code no longer allocated
	AYM	Airman, S.L.	AIRMAN	Spain	
	NPT	West Atlantic UK	NEPTUNE	United Kingdom	
	GBN	Atlantic Airlines	ATLANTIC GABON	Gabon	
EX	BJK	Atlantic Airlines	BLACKJACK	United States	
	HHA	Atlantic Airlines de Honduras	ATLANTIC HONDURAS	Honduras	defunct
	AYN	Atlantic Airlines, S.A.	ATLANTIC NICARAGUA	Nicaragua	
	AYS	Awsaj Aviation Services		Libya	ICAO code no longer allocated
	AYT	Ayeet Aviation & Tourism	AYEET	Israel	
3G	AYZ	Atlant-Soyuz Airlines	ATLANT-SOYUZ	Russia	defunct
AZ	AZA	Alitalia	ALITALIA	Italy	defunct
ZE	AZE	Arcus-Air Logistic	ARCUS AIR	Germany	
A2	AZI	Astra Airlines	ASTRA	Greece	
	AZK	Azalhelikopter	AZALHELICOPTER	Azerbaijan	
	AZL	Africa One	SKY AFRICA	Zambia	defunct
	AZM	Aerocozumel	AEROCOZUMEL	Mexico	
	AZP	Arizona Pacific Airways	ARIZONA PACIFIC	United States	
	AZS	Aviacon Zitotrans Air Company	ZITOTRANS	Russia	
	AZT	Azimut, S.A.	AZIMUT	Spain	
	AZV	Azov Avia Airlines	AZOV AVIA	Ukraine	defunct, Asov-Avia, Aircompany
	MHC	Aero Jomacha	AERO JOMACHA	Mexico	
	AZY	Arizona Airways, Inc.	ARIZAIR	United States	
	AZZ	Azza Transport	AZZA TRANSPORT	Sudan	
	NAR	Air Continental Inc	NIGHT AIR	United States	
	NAU	Antanik-Air	ANTANIK	Ukraine	
	NER	Air Newark	NEWAIR	United States	
	NFF	Aircraft Support and Services		Lebanon	ICAO code no longer allocated
	OBA	Aerobanana	AEROBANANA	Mexico	
	OBK	Amako Airlines	AMAKO AIR	Nigeria	
R7	OCA	Aserca Airlines	AROSCA	Venezuela	
	NFS	Afrique Cargo Service Senegal		Senegal	defunct
	NGC	Angoservice	ANGOSERVICE	Angola	
	NGE	Angel Airlines	ANGEL AIR	Thailand	defunct, ICAO code no longer allocated
	NGF	Angel Flight America	ANGEL FLIGHT	United States	Renamed Air Charity Network in 2014
	OUL	Air Atonabee	CITY EXPRESS	Canada	defunct
	OVA	Aero Nova	AERONOVA	Spain	
	XPE	Amira Air	EXPERT	Austria	
	XSS	Aero Express Intercontinental	INTER EXPRESS	Mexico	
	TLR	Air Libya Tibesti	AIR LIBYA	Libya	
	OVC	Aerovic		Ecuador	
	RVE	Airventure	AIRVENTURE	Belgium	
	RVI	Aero Servicios	AERO SERVICIOS	Mexico	
	RVL	Airvallee	AIR VALLEE	Italy	
	OVE	Aeromover	AEROMOVER	Mexico	
	OVI	Aerovías Ejecutivas	VIAS EJECUTIVAS	Mexico	
	PTD	Aero Servicio Pity	PITY	Mexico	
	PTE	Aero Copter	AERO-COP	Mexico	
	PLL	Air Pal	AIRPAL	Spain	Escuela De Pilots
	PLM	Air Pullmantur	PULLMANTUR	Spain	
RX	AEH	Aviaexpress	AVEX	Hungary	defunct
	PSG	Aviones Para Servirle	SERVIAVIONES	Mexico	
	SLU	Avio Sluzba	AVIO SLUZBA	Serbia	
	SCU	Air Scorpio	SCORPIO UNIVERS	Bulgaria	
	SIP	Air Spirit	AIR SPIRIT	United States	
	BMV	Alatau Airlines	OLIGA	Kazakhstan	
	GUG	Aviateca	AVIATECA	Guatemala	
	PXX	Aroostook Aviation	PINE STATE	United States	
	PYC	Aeropycsa	AEROPYCSA	Mexico	
	PVK	Association of Private Pilots of Kazakhstan	BORIS	Kazakhstan	ICAO code no longer allocated
	BAS	Aero Services	AEROSERV	Barbados	
	BBT	Air Bashkortostan	AGYDAL	Russia	defunct
	MCY	Ambulance Air Africa	MERCY	South Africa	
MQ	EGF	American Eagle Airlines	EAGLE FLIGHT	United States	Renamed Envoy Air, ICAO Code and Callsign withdrawn in 2014
	PUE	Aeropuelche	PUELCHE	Chile	
	PUT	Aeroput		Serbia	defunct
ZS	AZI	Azzurra Air	AZZURRA	Italy	defunct
FF		Airshop		Netherlands	
ML	ETC	African Transport Trading and Investment Company	TRANATTICO	Sudan	
	XCT	Aero Costa Taxi Aéreo	AEROCOSTAXI	Mexico	
	VRO	Aerovitro	AEROVITRO	Mexico	
	VRI	Aerotaxi Villa Rica	VILLARICA	Mexico	
	VEG	Aerovega	AEROVEGA	Mexico	
	VVG	Aerovilla	AEROVILLA	Colombia	
	VLR	Aerolíneas Villaverde	VILLAVERDE	Mexico	
WI	WIL	Aero Air	WILLIAMETTE	United States	
	VEJ	Aero Ejecutivos	VENEJECUTIV	Venezuela	
	WAB	Aero Industries Inc	WABASH	United States	
	VNG	Aero Servicios Vanguardia	VANGUARDIA	Mexico	
	VAD	Aero Taxi Los Valles	VALLES	Spain	
	VMR	Aero Vilamoura	AERO VILAMOURA	Portugal	ICAO code no longer allocated
	VLS	Aero Virel	VIREL	Mexico	
	XAA	Aeronautical Radio Inc	ROCKFISH	United States	
	VUO	Aerovuelox	AEROVUELOX	Mexico	
	VTM	Aeronaves TSM	AERONAVES TSM	Mexico	
VU	VUN	Air Ivoire	AIRIVOIRE	Ivory Coast	defunct
BP	BOT	Air Botswana	BOTSWANA	Botswana	
	XPR	Air-Rep		United States	
	XLL	Air Excel	TINGA-TINGA	Tanzania	
	VAE	Air Evans	AIR-EVANS	Spain	Ecuela de Pilotos Privados
	WHY	Air Sorel	AIR SOREL	Canada	
	WDR	Air Net Private Charter	WIND RIDER	United States	
	XEC	Air Executive Charter		Germany	
GS	UPA	Air Foyle	FOYLE	United Kingdom	defunct, ICAO code no longer allocated
	VTY	Air Midwest (Nigeria)	VICTORY	Nigeria	
VT	VTA	Air Tahiti	AIR TAHITI	French Polynesia	
3N	URG	Air Urga	URGA	Ukraine	
	VDR	Air Vardar	VARDAR	Macedonia	ICAO code in use by another company, call sign no longer allocated
VL	VIM	Air VIA	CRYSTAL	Bulgaria	
	WLR	Air Walser	AIRWALSER	Italy	
	URA	Aircompany Rosavia	ROSAVIA	Ukraine	
	XLB	Aircraft Performance Group		United States	
	WLA	Airwaves Airlink	AIRLIMITED	Zambia	
	XFX	Airways Corporation of New Zealand	AIRCORP	New Zealand	
	WAY	Airways	GARONNE	France	
	WGS	Airwings oy	AIRWINGS	Finland	
	XAK	Airkenya	SUNEXPRESS	Kenya	
	WPK	Air-Lift Associates	WOLFPACK	United States	
	VAB	Airtrans Ltd		Russia	
	URP	ARP 410 Airlines	AIR-ARP	Ukraine	
	WPR	Auckland Regional Rescue Helicopter Trust	WESTPAC RESCUE	New Zealand	
	URR	Aurora Airlines	AIR AURORA	Slovenia	defunct, ICAO code no longer allocated
	UST	Austro Aéreo	AUSTRO AEREO	Ecuador	
	WLT	Aviation Partners	WINGLET	United States	
	VLV	Avialift Vladivostok	VLADLIFT	Russia	
	VME	Aviación Comercial de América	AVIAMERICA	Mexico	
	VVA	Aviast Air	IALSI	Russia	defunct
	WLV	Aviation North	WOLVERINE	United States	
FK	WTA	Africa West	WEST TOGO	Togo	
	VNT	Avient Air Zambia	AVIENT	Zambia	
	VZR	Aviazur	IAZUR	France	
	VID	Aviaprad	AVIAPRAD	Russia	defunct
G2	VXG	Avirex	AVIREX-GABON	Gabon	
	VXX	Aviaexpress Aircompany	EXPRESSAVIA	Ukraine	
	XAM	AMR Services Corporation	ALLIANCE	United States	
	XAO	Airline Operations Services		United States	
	VAZ	Airlines 400	REMONT AIR	Russia	
V8	VAS	ATRAN Cargo Airlines	ATRAN	Russian Federation	
	VAM	Ameravia	AMERAVIA	Uruguay	
K6	KHV	Angkor Air	AIR ANGKOR	Cambodia	
	VBC	AVB-2004 Ltd	AIR VICTOR	Bulgaria	
	XKX	ASECNA		France	
	XAT	AT and T Aviation Division		United States	
	CAJ	Air Caraibes Atlantique	CAR LINE	France	
	CAO	Air China Cargo	AIRCHINA FREIGHT	China	
	CBE	Aerovías Caribe	AEROCARIBE	Mexico	
	CBO	Aerotaxi del Cabo	TAXI CABO	Mexico	
	CBS	Air Columbus	AIR COLUMBUS	Ukraine	
	CBV	Aereo Cabo	CABOAEREO	Mexico	
CA	CCA	Air China	AIR CHINA	China	
	CDA	Aerocardal	CARDAL	Chile	
Q6	CDP	Aero Condor Peru	CONDOR-PERU	Peru	
	CDU	Aerotrans		Russia	
	CDV	Airline Skol	SKOL	Russia	
	CFF	Aerofan	AEROFAN	Spain	
	CFR	Africa One		Democratic Republic of the Congo	defunct
	CFV	Aero Calafia	CALAFIA	Mexico	
	CGB	Air Cargo Belize	CARGO BELIZE	Belize	
	CGV	Aero Clube Do Algarve	CLUBE ALGARVE	Portugal	
	CGW	Air Great Wall	CHANGCHENG	China	defunct
	CHJ	Aircompany Chaika	AIR CHAIKA	Ukraine	
	CHR	Air Charter Services	ZAIRE CHARTER	Democratic Republic of the Congo	
	CHV	Air Charter Professionals	CHARTAIR	United States	
	CID	Asia Continental Airlines	ACID	Kazakhstan	defunct, ICAO code no longer allocated
5F	CIR	Arctic Circle Air Service	AIR ARCTIC	United States	defunct 2011
	CKL	Aviation Charter Services	CIRCLE CITY	United States	
	CLL	Aerovías Castillo	AEROCASTILLO	Mexico	
	CLP	Aero Club De Portugal	CLUB PORTUGAL	Portugal	
	CMF	Air Care Alliance	COMPASSION	United States	
	CNE	Air Toronto	CONNECTOR	Canada	
	CNH	Aquila Air	CHENANGO	United States	
	CNU	Air Consul	AIR CONSUL	Spain	
	CNX	AllCanada Express	CANEX	Canada	defunct
	CPF	Airtechservice	TECHSERVICE	Ukraine	defunct
QC	CRD	Air Corridor	AIR CORRIDOR	Mozambique	defunct
NV	CRF	Air Central	AIR CENTRAL	Japan	Ceased operations 2010
	CRJ	Air Cruzal	AIR CRUZAL	Angola	
	CRP	Aerotransportes Corporativos	AEROTRANSCORP	Mexico	
YN	CRQ	Air Creebec	CREE	Canada	
	CTA	Aero Charter and Transport	CHAR-TRAN	United States	
	CTE	Air Tenglong	TENGLONG	China	
	CTR	Aerolíneas Centauro	CENTAURO	Mexico	
	CUO	Aerocuahonte	CUAHONTE	Mexico	
CV	CVA	Air Chathams	CHATHAM	New Zealand	
CW	CWM	Air Marshall Islands	AIR MARSHALLS	Marshall Islands	
	CWP	Australian Customs Service	COASTWATCH	Australia	
	CYL	Air One Cityliner	CITYLINER	Italy	
	CYO	Air Transport	COYOTE	United States	
	CYE	Aerocheyenne	AEROCHEYENNE	Mexico	
AH	DAH	Air Algérie	AIR ALGERIE	Algeria	
	DAP	Aerovías DAP	DAP	Chile	
	DBA	Air Alpha	DOUBLE-A	United States	
	DBD	Air Niagara Express	AIR NIAGARA	Canada	
	DEF	Aviation Defense Service	TIRPA	France	
	DEG	Air Service Groningen	DEGGER	Netherlands	ICAO code and call sign no longer allocated
ER	DHL	Astar Air Cargo	D-H-L	United States	defunct, DHL
	DHM	Archer Aviation	ARCHER	United Kingdom	ICAO code no longer allocated
	DIC	Aeromedica	AEROMEDICA	Mexico	
	DIN	Aerodin	AERODIN	Mexico	
	DJU	Air Djibouti	AIR DJIB	Djibouti	defunct
EN	DLA	Air Dolomiti	DOLOMITI	Italy	
	DLS	Aero Modelo	AEROMODELO	Mexico	
	DLU	Aerolíneas del Sur	DEL SUR	Chile	defunct
	DMC	Aerodinamica de Monterrey	DINAMICAMONT	Mexico	
	DMI	Aeroservicios Dinamicos	AERODINAMICO	Mexico	
	DML	Aerotaxis Dosmil		Mexico	
	DNA	Aerodespachos de El Salvador	AERODESPACHOS	El Salvador	
	DNC	Aerodynamics Málaga	FLYINGOLIVE	Spain	
	DNJ	Aerodynamics Incorporated	DYNAJET	United States	
NM	DRD	Air Madrid	ALADA AIR	Spain	defunct
	DRM	Airways Flight Training	DARTMOOR	United Kingdom	
	DRO	Aeronaves Del Noreste	AERONORESTE	Mexico	
6R	DRU	Alrosa Air Company	MIRNY	Russia	
	DSK	Aero Algarve	SKYBANNER	Portugal	ICAO code no longer allocated
	DST	Aex Air	DESERT	United States	
	EAT	Air – Transport Europe	TRANS EUROPE	Slovakia	
EE	EAY	Aero Airlines	REVAL	Estonia	defunct
	EBC	Aero Ejecutivo De Baja California	CALIXJET	Mexico	
4F	ECE	Air City	AIRCITY	Germany	
	ECG	Aero Ejecutivos RCG	EJECTUIVOS RCG	Mexico	
	ECL	Aeronáutica Castellana	AERO CASTELLANA	Spain	
	ECM	Aerolíneas Comerciales	AERO COMERCIALES	Mexico	
	EDA	Aerolineas Nacionales Del Ecuador	ANDES	Ecuador	defunct
	EET	Air Este	AESTE	Spain	
	EFC	Air Mana	FLIGHT TAXI	France	
	EJP	Aeroservicios Ejecutivos Corporativos	EJECCORPORATIVOS	Mexico	
E8	ELG	Alpi Eagles	ALPI EAGLES	Italy	defunct, ICAO code no longer allocated
	ALX	ALPI Jets	ALPIJETS	Austria	
	END	Arrendadora y Transportadora Aérea	ARRENDADORA	Mexico	
	ENW	Aeronaves Del Noroeste	AERONOR	Spain	
	EOL	Airailes	EOLE	France	
RF	EOK	Aero K	AEROHANKUK	South Korea	established in May 2016; commenced operations on 15 April 2021
	EOM	Aero Ermes	AERO ERMES	Mexico	
	EPL	Aero Transportes Empresariales	EMPRESARIALES	Mexico	
	EPE	Aero Empresarial	AEROEMPRESARIAL	Mexico	
KY	EQL	Air São Tomé and Príncipe	EQUATORIAL	São Tomé and Príncipe	defunct
	ERG	Avianergo	AVIANERGO	Russia	defunct
	ERI	Aero Servicios Regiomontanos	ASERGIO	Mexico	
	ERK	Aerosec	AEROSEC	Chile	
	ERM	Aeromaan	EOMAAN	Mexico	
	ESB	Aereosaba	AEREOSABA	Mexico	
	ESO	Avitat		United Kingdom	
	ESU	Aerolíneas Ejecutivas Del Sureste	ALESUR	Mexico	
	ESZ	Aeronáutica La Esperanza	ESPERANZA	Mexico	
	ETE	Aero Siete	AEROSIETE	Mexico	
	EUK	Air Atlanta Europe	SNOWBIRD	United Kingdom	defunct
	EVE	Air Evex	SUNBEAM	Germany	
	EVR	Aeronautical Academy of Europe	DIANA	Portugal	
E2/E6	EWE/EWL	Eurowings Europe	EUROPWINGS BLACK PEARL	Austria	
	EXG	Air Exchange	EXCHANGE	United States	
	FAC	Atlantic Helicopters	FAROECOPTER	Denmark	
	FAG	Argentine Air Force	FUAER	Argentina	
PC	FAJ	Air Fiji	FIJIAIR	Fiji	defunct
	FAN	AF-Air International	FANBIRD	Angola	
	FBW	Aviation Data Systems		United States	
	FCI	Air Carriers	FAST CHECK	United States	
	FCO	Aerofrisco	AEROFRISCO	Mexico	
	FCU	Alfa 4		Mexico	
JH	FDA	Fuji Dream Airlines	FUJI DREAM	Japan	
	FDS	African Medical and Research Foundation	FLYDOC	Kenya	
	FGT	Aero Freight	FREIAERO	Mexico	
	FIC	Aerosafin	AEROSAFIN	Mexico	
OF	FIF	Air Finland	AIR FINLAND	Finland	
	FII	Aerodata Flight Inspection	FLIGHT CHECKER	Germany	ICAO code no longer allocated
	FIX	Airfix Aviation	AIRFIX	Finland	
FJ	FJI	Fiji Airways	PACIFIC	Fiji	
	FLD	Air Falcon		Pakistan	
RC	FLI	Atlantic Airways	FAROELINE	Faroe Islands	
	FLP	Aeroclub Flaps	AEROCLUB FLAPS	Spain	defunct
QH	FLZ	Aero Leasing	AIR FLORIDA	United States	dba Air Florida
	FMT	Air Fret De Mauritanie		Mauritania	
	FNM	Avio Nord		Italy	
	FNO	Aeroflota Del Noroeste	RIAZOR	Spain	
	FNX	Aero Fenix	AERO FENIX	France	ICAO code no longer allocated
	FPY	African Company Airlines	AFRICOMPANY	Democratic Republic of the Congo	Defunct. ICAO code in use by another company.
	FRJ	Afrijet Airlines	AFRIJET	Nigeria	
	FRK	Afrika Aviation Handlers	AFRIFAST	Kenya	
	FRQ	Afrique Chart'air	CHARTER AFRIQUE	Cameroon	
	FRT	Aerofreight Airlines		Russia	
	FST	Aeros Limited	FAST TRACK	United Kingdom	ICAO code no longer allocated
	FTC	Air Affaires Tchad	AFFAIRES TCHAD	Chad	
NY	FXI	Air Iceland	FAXI	Iceland	
	GAU	Aerogaucho	AEROGAUCHO	Uruguay	
	GBJ	Aero Business Charter	GLOBAL JET	Germany	
	GCF	Aeronor	AEROCARTO	Spain	
	GCK	Aerogem Cargo	AEROGEM	Ghana	defunct
	GFO	Aerovías del Golfo	AEROVIAS GOLFO	Mexico	
	GGL	Aeronáutica	GIRA GLOBO	Angola	
ZX	GGN	Air Georgian	GEORGIAN	Canada	
	GHL	Aviance UK	HANDLING	United Kingdom	Gatwick Handling
	GHN	Air Ghana	AIR GHANA	Ghana	
	GIL	African International Transport	AFRICAN TRANSPORT	Guinea	
2U	GIP	Air Guinee Express	FUTURE EXPRESS	Guinea	
	GIZ	Africa Airlines	AFRILENS	Guinea	
	GLL	Air Gemini	TWINS	Angola	
	GLT	Aero Charter	GASLIGHT	United States	
	GME	Aguilas Mayas Internacional	MAYAN EAGLES	Guatemala	
	GMM	Aerotaxis Guamuchil	AEROGUAMUCHIL	Mexico	
	GMS	Aeroservicios Gama	SERVICIOS GAMA	Mexico	
0A	GNT	Amber Air	GINTA	Lithuania	
	GOA	Alberta Government	ALBERTA	Canada	
	GRE	Air Scotland	GREECE AIRWAYS	Greece	
DA	GRG	Air Georgia	AIR GEORGIA	Georgia	
	GRI	Air Cargo Center		São Tomé and Príncipe	
LL	GRO	Allegro	ALLEGRO	Mexico	defunct (IATA code reallocated)
	GRR	Agroar - Trabalhos Aéreos	AGROAR	Portugal	
	GRX	Aircompany Grodno	GRODNO	Belarus	
	GSP	Airlift Alaska	GREEN SPEED	United States	
	GSV	Agrocentr-Avia	AGRAV	Kazakhstan	
	GTC	Altin Havayolu Tasimaciligi Turizm Ve Ticaret	GOLDEN WINGS	Turkey	
5Y	GTI	Atlas Air	GIANT	United States	
	GTP	Aerotaxi Grupo Tampico	GRUPOTAMPICO	Mexico	
	GUA	Aerotaxis de Aguascalientes	AGUASCALIENTES	Mexico	
GG	GUY	Air Guyane	GREEN BIRD	French Guiana	
	GVI	Air Victoria Georgia	IRINA	Georgia	
H9	HAD	Air d'Ayiti	HAITI AVIA	Haiti	
GG	HAH	Air Comores International	AIR COMORES	Comoros	
	HAT	Air Taxi	TAXI BIRD	France	
	HEI	Aerohein	AEROHEIN	Chile	
	HGH	Atlantic Air Lift	HIGHER	France	
	HID	Aviación Ejecutiva De Hildago	EJECUTIVA HIDALGO	Mexico	
	HJA	Air Haiti	AIRHAITI	Haiti	
HD	HLN	Air Holland	ORANGE	Netherlands	defunct
	HJT	Al Rais Cargo	AL-RAIS CARGO	United Arab Emirates	
	HKH	Air-Invest	HAWKHUNGARY	Hungary	
	HMA	Air Tahoma	TAHOMA	United States	ICAO code no longer allocated
	HMT	Air Nova	HAMILTON	United Kingdom	ICAO code no longer allocated
	HOM	Aero Homex	AERO HOMEX	Mexico	
	HPO	Almiron Aviation	ALMIRON	Uganda	
	HQO	Avinor		Norway	
	HYR	Airlink Airways	HIGHFLYER	Ireland	
8C	HZT	Air Horizon	HORIZON TOGO	Togo	
	ICM	Air Inter Cameroun	INTER-CAMEROUN	Cameroon	
	IFI	Air Lift	HELLAS LIFT	Greece	
	IKM	Aero Survey	EASY SHUTTLE	Ghana	Callsign changed from GHANA SURVEY
	ILK	Aero Airline	ILEK	Kazakhstan	
	IME	Airtime Charters	AIRTIME	United Kingdom	ICAO code no longer allocated
	IMN	Aerotaxis Cimarron	TAXI CIMARRON	Mexico	
	INA	Aero Internacional	AERO-NACIONAL	Mexico	
	ING	Aeroingenieria	AEROINGE	Chile	defunct
	INO	Aeroservicios Intergrados de Norte	INTENOR	Mexico	
	IPL	Airpull Aviation	IPULL	Spain	
	IRD	Arvand Airlines	ARVAND	Iran	
	IRH	Atlas Aviation Group	ATLAS AVIA	Iran	
	IRW	Aram Airline	ARAM	Iran	
	IRX	Aria Tour	ARIA	Iran	
	ITE	Aerotaxi S.R.O.	AEROTAXI	Czech Republic	
	ITF	Avita-Servicos Aéreos	AIR AVITA	Angola	
	ITI	AirSwift	AIRSWIFT	Philippines	
	ITO	Aero Citro	AERO CITRO	Mexico	
	IVE	Air Executive	COMPANY EXEC	Spain	
	IWS	Aviainvest		Russia	
W9	JAB	Air Bagan	AIR BAGAN	Myanmar	
	JAD	Aerojal	AEROJAL	Mexico	
	JAR	Airlink	AIRLINK	Austria	
	JEE	Ambjek Air Services	AMBJEK AIR	Nigeria	
	JKH	JETKONTOR AG	JETKONTOR	Germany	
	UTX	Avfinity		United States	
	JMR	Alexandair	ALEXANDAIR	Canada	
	JMX	Air Jamaica Express	JAMAICA EXPRESS	Jamaica	
	JOA	Air Swift Aviation		Australia	
	JOB	Aerojobeni	JOBENI	Mexico	
IP	JOL	Atyrau Air Ways	EDIL	Kazakhstan	
	JPR	Aerosmith Aviation	JASPER	United States	ICAO code no longer allocated
	JTS	Arrendamiento de Aviones Jets	AVIONESJETS	Mexico	
	JUA	Aero Juarez	JUAREZ	Mexico	
QK	JZA	Air Canada Jazz	JAZZ	Canada	
	KAA	Asia Aero Survey and Consulting Engineers	AASCO	Republic of Korea	ICAO code no longer allocated
	KAD	Air Kirovograd	AIR KIROVOGRAD	Ukraine	
	KAM	Air Mach	ICO-AIR	Italy	
	KAV	Air Kufra	AIRKUFRA	Libya	
	KEK	Arkhabay	ARKHABAY	Kazakhstan	ICAO code no longer allocated
	KFK	Aero Charter Krifka	KRIFKA AIR	Austria	
	KFT	Air Kraft Mir	AIR KRAFT MIR	Uzbekistan	
	KGD	Air Concorde	CONCORDE AIR	Bulgaria	
	KHH	Alexandria Airlines		Egypt	
	KIE	Afit	TWEETY	Germany	
	KKB	Air South	KHAKI BLUE	United States	
KK	KKK	Atlasjet	ATLASJET	Turkey	
	KLB	Air Mali International	TRANS MALI	Mali	
	KLZ	Aerokaluz	AEROKALUZ	Mexico	
JS	KOR	Air Koryo	AIR KORYO	North Korea	
	KOY	Araiavia	ALEKS	Kazakhstan	
	KRE	AeroSucre	AEROSUCRE	Colombia	
	KRT	Air Kokshetau	KOKTA	Kazakhstan	ICAO code no longer allocated
	KSI	Air Kissari	KISSARI	Angola	
	KTN	Aeronavigaciya	AERONAVIGACIYA	Ukraine	
	KVR	Alliance Avia	KAVAIR	Kazakhstan	
	KYC	Av Atlantic	DOLPHIN	United States	
KC	KZR	Air Astana	ASTANALINE	Kazakhstan	
	LAG	Aviation Legacy	AVILEG	Gambia	
		Aerovías De Lagos	AEROLAGOS	Mexico	Was LAG
LV	LBC	Albanian Airlines	ALBANIAN	Albania	
	LBI	Albisa	ALBISA	Mexico	
	LBW	Albatros Airways	ALBANWAYS	Albania	
	LDG	Aerolíneas Aéreas Ejecutivas De Durango	DURANGO	Mexico	
3S	BOX	Aerologic	GERMAN CARGO	Germany	
	LDN	Al-Donas Airlines	ALDONAS AIR	Nigeria	
QP	AKJ	Akasa Air	AKASA AIR	India	
	LDR	Aero Lider	AEROLIDER	Mexico	
	LEM	Aleem		Egypt	
	LET	Aerolíneas Ejecutivas	MEXEJECUTIV	Mexico	
H7	LFA	Air Alfa	AIR ALFA	Turkey	
	LFC	Aero Control Air	LIFE FLIGHT CANADA	Canada	defunct
	LGN	Aerolaguna	AEROLAGUNA	Mexico	
	LHR	Al Ahram Aviation	AL AHRAM	Egypt	
D4	LID	Alidaunia	ALIDA	Italy	
	LIE	Al-Dawood Air	AL-DAWOOD AIR	Nigeria	
	LKP	American Aviation	LAKE POWELL	United States	ICAO code no longer allocated
	LKS	Airlink Solutions	AIRLIN	Spain	
	LKY	Air Solutions	LUCKY	United States	
9I	LLR	Air India Regional	ALLIED	India	
	LMA	Aerolima	AEROLIMA	Mexico	
	LML	Alamia Air	ALAMIA AIR	Libya	ICAO code no longer allocated
	LMP	Air Plus Argentina	AIR FLIGHT	Argentina	
	LMT	Almaty Aviation	ALMATY	Kazakhstan	
	LMX	Aerolíneas Mexicanas J S	LINEAS MEXICANAS	Mexico	
	LMY	Air Almaty	AGLEB	Kazakhstan	
	LMZ	Air Almaty ZK	ALUNK	Kazakhstan	
4Z	LNK	Airlink	LINK	South Africa	
	LNT	Aerolíneas Internacionales	LINEAINT	Mexico	
	LOK	Alok Air	ALOK AIR	Sudan	
	LOU	Air Saint Louis	AIR SAINTLOUIS	Senegal	
FL	LPA	Air Leap	LEAP	Sweden	
	LPC	Alpine Aviation	NETSTAR	South Africa	
A6	LPV	Air Alps Aviation	ALPAV	Austria	
	LRO	Alrosa-Avia	ALROSA	Russia	
	LRW	Al Rida Airways	AL RIDA	Mauritania	
	LSK	Aurela	AURELA	Lithuania	
	LSM	Aerobusinessservice		Russia	defunct
	LSR	Alsair	ALSAIR	France	
	LTI	Aerotaxis Latinoamericanos	LATINO	Mexico	
	LUC	Albinati Aeronautics	ALBINATI	Switzerland	
TD	LUR	Atlantis European Airways	ATLANTIS	Armenia	defunct
	LVN	Aliven	ALIVEN	Italy	
	LVR	Aviavilsa	AVIAVILSA	Lithuania	
L8	LXG	Air Luxor GB	LUXOR GOLF	Guinea-Bissau	
LK	LXR	Air Luxor	AIRLUXOR	Portugal	ICAO code no longer allocated
	LYT	Apatas Air	APATAS	Lithuania	
	LZP	Air Ban	DOC AIR	Bulgaria	
	LZR	Air Lazur	LAZUR BEE-GEE	Bulgaria	
	MAM	Aeródromo De La Mancha	AEROMAN	Spain	
MK	MAU	Air Mauritius	AIRMAURITIUS	Mauritius	
	MBA	Avag Air	AVAG AIR	Austria	
	MBB	Air Manas	AIR MANAS	Kyrgyzstan	
	MBC	Airjet Exploração Aérea de Carga	MABECO	Angola	
	MBV	Aeriantur-M	AEREM	Moldova	defunct
	MCB	Air Mercia	WESTMID	United Kingdom	
	MCD	Air Medical	AIR MED	United Kingdom	
	MCO	Aerolíneas Marcos	MARCOS	Mexico	
	MDC	Atlantic Aero and Mid-Atlantic Freight	NIGHT SHIP	United States	
MD	MDG	Air Madagascar	AIR MADAGASCAR	Madagascar	
	MDX	Aerosud Charter	MEDAIR	South Africa	
	MEF	Air Meridan	EMPENNAGE	Nigeria	
	MFL	Aero McFly	MCFLY	Mexico	
	MGE	Asia Pacific Airlines	MAGELLAN	United States	
	MGS	Aeromagar	AEROMAGAR	Mexico	
	MIE	Aero Premier De Mexico	AEROPREMIER	Mexico	
9U	MLD	Air Moldova	AIR MOLDOVA	Moldova	
	MLF	Amal Airlines	AMAL	Djibouti	
L9	MLI	Air Mali	AIR MALI	Mali	defunct
	MLN	Air Madeleine	AIR MADELEINE	Canada	
	MMC	Aermarche	AERMARCHE	Italy	
	MMD	Air Alsie	MERMAID	Denmark	
	MMM	Aviation Company Meridian	AVIAMERIDIAN	Russia	
	MMP	AMP Incorporated	AMP-INC	United States	
	MMX	Airmax	PERUMAX	Peru	
	MNE	Aerolíneas Amanecer	AEROAMANECER	Mexico	
	MNG	Aero Mongolia	AERO MONGOLIA	Mongolia	
	MOC	Air Monarch Cargo	MONARCH CARGO	Mexico	
	MOP	Aeropublicitaria De Angola	PUBLICITARIA	Angola	
	MOR	Aerolíneas De Morelia	AEROMORELIA	Mexico	
A7	MPD	Air Plus Comet	RED COMET	Spain	
QO	MPX	Aeromexpress	AEROMEXPRESS	Mexico	
	MQT	Air ITM	MUSKETEER	France	
	MRL	Aeromorelos	AEROMORELOS	Mexico	
	MRM	Aerocharter	MARITIME	Canada	
MR	MRT	Air Mauritanie	MIKE ROMEO	Mauritania	
SM	MSC	Air Cairo	AIR CAIRO	Egypt	
	MSK	Air Sport	AIR SPORT	Bulgaria	
	MSM	Aeromas	AEROMAS EXPRESS	Uruguay	
	MSO	Aerolíneas Mesoamericanas	MESO AMERICANAS	Mexico	
	MSV	Aero-Kamov	AERAFKAM	Russia	
	MTB	Aerotaxis Metropolitanos	AEROMETROPOLIS	Mexico	
	MTE	Aeromet Línea Aérea	AEROMET	Chile	defunct
	MTK	Air Metack	AIRMETACK	Angola	
	MTY	Air Montegomery	MONTY	United Kingdom	ICAO code no longer allocated
	MXO	Aerotaxi Mexicano	MAXAERO	Mexico	
	MYS	Aero Yaqui Mayo	AERO YAQUI	Mexico	
	MZK	AVC Airlines		Japan	
	MZL	Aerovías Montes Azules	MONTES AZULES	Mexico	
2V*		Amtrak		United States	Train services only
F4	NBK	Albarka Air	AL-AIR	Nigeria	
	NEL	Aero Servicios de Nuevo Laredo	AEROLAREDO	Mexico	
	NGV	Angoavia	ANGOAVIA	Angola	
	NID	Aeroni	AERONI	Mexico	
	NIE	Aeroejecutiva Nieto	AERONIETO	Mexico	
AJ	NIG	Aero Contractors	AEROLINE	Nigeria	
	NKZ	Aerokuzbass	NOVOKUZNETSK	Russia	
	NRE	Aviones Are	AVIONES ARE	Mexico	
	NRS	Atlantic Richfield Company	NORTH SLOPE	United States	
	NSO	Aerolíneas Sosa	SOSA	Honduras	
	NTD	Aero Norte		Mexico	
	NTV	Air Inter Ivoire	INTER-IVOIRE	Ivory Coast	
	NUL	Aeroservicios De Nuevo Leon	SERVICIOS NUEVOLEON	Mexico	
	NVI	Avial NV Aviation Company	NEW AVIAL	Russia	
	NWG	Airwing	NORWING	Norway	
	NXA	Air Next	BLUE-DOLPHIN	Japan	
	OAO	Arkhangelsk 2 Aviation Division	DVINA	Russia	
	OGI	Aerogisa	AEROGISA	Mexico	
	OLV	Aerolíneas Olve	OLVE	Mexico	
	OMG	Aeromega	OMEGA	United Kingdom	
	ONR	Air One Nine	EDER	Libya	ICAO code no longer allocated
	ONT	Air Ontario	ONTARIO	Canada	
	ORP	Aerocorp	CORPSA	Mexico	IATA changed to RCP; callsign changed to AEROCORPSA
	OSN	Aerosan	AEROSAN	Mexico	
	OSO	Aviapartner Limited Company		Russia	
	PAJ	Aliparma	ALIPARMA	Italy	
	PBT	Air Parabet	PARABET	Bangladesh	
8Y	PBU	Air Burundi	AIR-BURUNDI	Burundi	
	PCG	Aeropostal Cargo de Mexico	POSTAL CARGO	Mexico	
	PCK	Air Pack Express	AIRPACK EXPRESS	Spain	
	PCS	Air Palace	AIR PALACE	Mexico	
OT	PEL	Aeropelican	PELICAN	Australia	
	PEV	Peoples Vienna Line	PEOPLES	Austria	
	PFI	Aerolíneas Chihuahua	PACIFICO CHIHUAHUA	Mexico	
	PFT	Air Cargo Express International	PROFREIGHT	United States	
	PHR	Al Farana Airline	PHARAOH	Egypt	
	PHW	Ave.com	PHOENIX SHARJAH	United Arab Emirates	ICAO code no longer allocated
	PIE	Air South West	PIRATE	United Kingdom	
	PIF	Aeroservicios California Pacifico	AEROCALPA	Mexico	
	PKA	AST Pakistan Airways	PAKISTAN AIRWAY	Pakistan	
	PNL	Aero Personal	AEROPERSONAL	Mexico	
	PNU	Aero Servicios Platinum	AERO PLATINUM	Mexico	
	POY	Apoyo Aéreo	APOYO AEREO	Mexico	
	PRT	Atlantic Coast Jet	PATRIOT	United States	
AD	PRZ	Air Paradise International	RADISAIR	Indonesia	Defunct 2005
	PZA	Aéreo Taxi Paraza	AEREO PARAZA	Mexico	
QD	QCL	Air Class Líneas Aéreas	ACLA	Uruguay	
	QEA	Aviation Consultancy Office		Australia	
	QAT	Aero Taxi	AIR QUASAR	Canada	defunct
	QKC	Aero Taxi Aviation	QUAKER CITY	United States	
	QLA	Aviation Quebec Labrador	QUEBEC LABRADOR	Canada	
QS	QSC	African Safari Airways	ZEBRA	Kenya	
	QUI	Aero Quimmco	QUIMMCO	Mexico	
	RAD	Alada	AIR ALADA	Angola	
	RAI	Aerotur Air	DIASA	Kazakhstan	
	RAP	Air Center Helicopters	RAPTOR	United States	
	RBE	Aur Rum Benin	RUM BENIN	Benin	
	RBJ	Aeroserivios Del Bajio	AEROBAJIO	Mexico	
4Y	RBU	Airbus France	AIRBUS FRANCE	France	
	RBV	Air Roberval	AIR ROBERVAL	Canada	
AG	ARU	Aruba Airlines	ARUBA	Aruba	
	RCC	Air Charters Eelde	RACER	Netherlands	ICAO code and call sign no longer allocated
	RCE	Aerocer	AEROCER	Mexico	
	RCF	Aeroflot-Cargo	AEROFLOT-CARGO	Russia	
MC	RCH	Air Mobility Command	REACH	United States	United States Air Force
	RCI	Air Cassai	AIR CASSAI	Angola	
	RCO	Aero Renta De Coahuila	AEROCOAHUILA	Mexico	
	RCP	Aerocorp	AEROCORPSA	Mexico	
	RCQ	Aerolíneas Regionales	REGIONAL CARGO	Mexico	
	RCU	Atlantic S.L.	AIR COURIER	Spain	
	RCX	Air Service Center	SERVICE CENTER	Italy	
	RDM	Air Ada	AIR ADA	Mauritania	
RE	REA	Aer Arann	AER ARANN	Ireland	
	REN	Aero-Rent	AERORENT	Mexico	
	RES	Australian Maritime Safety Authority	RESCUE	Australia	
UU	REU	Air Austral	REUNION	France	
	REY	Aero-Rey	AEROREY	Mexico	
	RFC	Aero Africa	AERO AFRICA	Swaziland	
ZP	AZP	Amaszonas Paraguay	GUARANI	Paraguay	
	RFD	Aerotransportes Rafilher	RAFHILER	Mexico	
	RGO	Argo	ARGOS	Dominican Republic	
	RGR	Avior Regional	AVIOR REGIONAL	Venezuela	2014
	RGT	Airbourne School of Flying	AIRGOAT	United Kingdom	ICAO code no longer allocated
	RHL	Air Archipels	ARCHIPELS	France	
	RIF	Aviation Ministry of the Interior of the Russian Federation	INTERMIN AVIA	Russian Federation	
	RIS	Aeris Gestión	AERIS	Spain	
6K	RIT	Asian Spirit	ASIAN SPIRIT	Philippines	
	RJS	Aeroservicios Jet	ASERJET	Mexico	
	RKA	Air Afrique	AIRAFRIC	Ivory Coast	
A5	RLA	Airlinair	AIRLINAIR	France	
NZ	RLK	Air Nelson	NELSON	New Zealand	defunct
	RLL	Air Leone	AEROLEONE	Sierra Leone	
QL	RLN	Aero Lanka	AERO LANKA	Sri Lanka	
	RLZ	Air Alize	ALIZE	France	
	RMD	Air Amder	AIR AMDER	Mauritania	
R3	RME	Armenian Airlines	ARMENIAN	Armenia	defunct
MV	RML	Air Mediterranean	HELLASMED	Greece	
	RMO	Arm-Aero	ARM-AERO	Armenia	
	RMX	Air Max	AEROMAX	Bulgaria	
2O	RNE	Air Salone	AIR SALONE	Sierra Leone	
	RNM	Aeronem Air Cargo	AEROMNEM	Ecuador	
	RNR	Air Cargo Masters	RUNNER	United States	
U8	RNV	Armavia	ARMAVIA	Armenia	defunct, ICAO code no longer allocated
	ROE	Aeroeste	ESTE-BOLIVIA	Bolivia	
	ROH	Aero Gen	AEROGEN	Mexico	
	ROI	Avior Airlines	AVIOR	Venezuela	
	ROL	Aeroel Airways	AEROEL	Israel	ICAO code no longer allocated
BQ	ROM	Aeromar Lineas Aereas Dominicanas	BRAVO QUEBEC	Dominican Republic	defunct
	ROO	Aeroitalia	AEROITALIA	Italy	defunct
	ROD	Aerodan	AERODAN	Mexico	
P5	RPB	AeroRepública	AEROREPUBLICA	Colombia	
	RPC	Aerolíneas Del Pacífico	AEROPACSA	Ecuador	
	RRC	Aero Roca	AEROROCA	Mexico	
	RRE	Aerotransportes Internacionales De Torreon	AERO TORREON	Mexico	
	RSC	Aerolíneas Ejecutivas Tarascas	TARASCAS	Mexico	
E4	RSO	Aero Asia International	AERO ASIA	Pakistan	defunct
BF	RSR	Aero-Service	CONGOSERV	Republic of the Congo	
5L	RSU	AeroSur	AEROSUR	Bolivia	
	RTE	Aeronorte	LUZAVIA	Portugal	ICAO code no longer allocated
	RTH	Artis	ARTHELICO	France	
	RTO	Arhabaev Tourism Airlines	ARTOAIR	Kazakhstan	
	RTQ	Air Turquoise	TURQUOISE	France	
	RTU	Aerotucan	AEROTUCAN	Mexico	
	RUD	Air Anastasia	ANASTASIA	Ukraine	
	RUM	Air Rum	AIR RUM	Sierra Leone	
	RVP	Air VIP	AEROVIP	Portugal	
	RVT	Aircompany Veteran	AIR-VET	Armenia	
	RWB	Alliance Express Rwanda		Rwanda	Formerly Air Rwanda, revived as RwandAir after the Rwandan Genocide
	RWC	Arrow Ecuador Arrowec	ARROWEC	Ecuador	
	RWY	Aerogroup 98 Limited	TYNWALD	United Kingdom	ICAO code no longer allocated
	RXT	Aeroxtra	AERO-EXTRA	Mexico	
	RWS	Air Whitsunday		Australia	
	RZL	Aero Zambia	AERO ZAMBIA	Zambia	
	RZN	Aero Zano	ZANO	Mexico	
	RZZ	Anoka Air Charter	RED ZONE	United States	
	SBH	Aerosaab	AEROSAAB	Mexico	
	SCD	Associated Aviation	ASSOCIATED	Nigeria	
	SCM	American Jet International	SCREAMER	United States	
EX	SDO	Air Santo Domingo	AERO DOMINGO	Dominican Republic	
	SDP	Aero Sudpacifico	SUDPACIFICO	Mexico	
	SEF	Aero Servicios Ejecutivas Del Pacifico	SERVIPACIFICO	Mexico	
JR	SER	Aero California	AEROCALIFORNIA	Mexico	
	SGV	Aerosegovia	SEGOVIA	Nicaragua	
	SHH	Airshare Holdings	AIRSHARE	United Kingdom	ICAO code no longer allocated
	SIY	Aerosiyusa	SIYUSA	Mexico	
	SIZ	Aero Silza	AEROSILZA	Mexico	
	SJN	Air San Juan	SAN JUAN	United States	
	SKP	Aero-North Aviation Services	SKIPPER	Canada	defunct
	SMI	Aero Sami	SAMI	Mexico	
Z3	SMJ	Avient Aviation	AVAVIA	Zimbabwe	
	SOD	Aerolíneas Sol	ALSOL	Mexico	
	SOE	Air Soleil	AIR SOLEIL	Mauritania	
	SOG	Aero Soga	AEROSOGA	Guinea-Bissau	defunct
	SPD	Airspeed Aviation	SPEEDLINE	Canada	ICAO code no longer allocated
M3	SPJ	Air Service	AIR SKOPJE	Macedonia	
	SPO	Aeroservicios Ejecutivos Del Pacifico	EJECTUIV PACIFICO	Mexico	
	SPY	Asian Aerospace Service	THAI SPACE	Thailand	
	SPZ	Airworld	SPEED SERVICE	South Africa	
	SQR	Alsaqer Aviation	ALSAQER AVIATION	Libya	ICAO code no longer allocated
	SRI	Air Safaris and Services	AIRSAFARI	New Zealand	
	SRV	Aero Servicio Corporativo	SERVICORP	Mexico	
	SSL	Air Sultan	SIERRA SULTAN	Sierra Leone	
	SSM	Aero 1 Pro-Jet	RAPID	Canada	defunct
	SSN	Airquarius Air Charter	SUNSTREAM	South Africa	ICAO code no longer allocated
	STK	Aeropac	SAT PAK	United States	
	STT	Air St. Thomas	PARADISE	United States	
	SUE	Aerolíneas Del Sureste	AEROSURESTE	Mexico	
8D*	SUW	Astair		Russian Federation	Name changed to Interavia Airlines
	SUY	Aerial Surveys (1980) Limited	SURVEY	New Zealand	
GM	SVK	Air Slovakia	SLOVAKIA	Slovakia	ICAO code no longer allocated
R3	SYL	Aircompany Yakutia	AIR YAKUTIA	Russia	
	SYT	Aerosud Aviation	SKYTRACK	South Africa	
HC	SZN	Air Senegal	AIR SENEGAL	Senegal	
	TAA	Aeroservicios de La Costa	AERO COSTA	Mexico	
VW	TAO	Aeromar	TRANS-AEROMAR	Mexico	
	TBL	Aerotrebol	AEROTREBOL	Mexico	
	TBO	Aero Taxi de Los Cabos	AERO CABOS	Mexico	
JY	TCI	Air Turks and Caicos	KERRMONT	Turks and Caicos Islands	ICAO code no longer allocated
	TCO	Aerotranscolombina de Carga	TRANSCOLOMBIA	Colombia	
	TDG	Air Cargo Express	TURBO DOG	United States	
	TDT	Atlas Helicopters	TRIDENT	United Kingdom	
	TDY	Air Today	AIR TODAY	United States	
	TED	Aero Servicios Azteca	AEROAZTECA	Mexico	
	TIR	Antair	ANTAIR	Mexico	
	TLD	Aereo Taxi Autlan	AEREO AUTLAN	Mexico	
	TLE	Aero Util	AEROUTIL	Mexico	
	TLU	Aero Toluca International	AEROTOLUCA	Mexico	
	TME	Aero Taxi del Centro de Mexico	TAXICENTRO	Mexico	
	TOC	Aerotropical	TROPICMEX	Mexico	
	TOH	Air Tomisko	TOMISKO CARGO	Serbia	
CG	TOK	Airlines PNG	BALUS	Papua New Guinea	
	TON	Aero Tonala	AEROTONALA	Mexico	
	TPB	Aero Tropical	AERO TROPICAL	Angola	
TY	TPC	Air Calédonie	AIRCAL	France	
	TPK	Air Horizon	TCHAD-HORIZON	Chad	
	TPO	Aero Taxi del Potosi	TAXI-POTOSI	Mexico	
	TQS	Aeroturquesa	AEROTURQUESA	Mexico	
	TRH	Airmark Aviation	TRANSTAR	United States	
FL	TRS	AirTran Airways	CITRUS	United States	defunct, last flight 12/30/2014, now part of Southwest Airlines
TS	TSC	Air Transat	AIR TRANSAT	Canada	
	TSQ	airtransse	AIRTRA	Japan	
	TTB	Aerolíneas Turísticas del Caribe	AERO TURISTICAS	Mexico	
	TTE	Avcenter	TETON	United States	
	TUN	Air Tungaru	TUNGARU	Kiribati	defunct
EC	TWN	Avialeasing Aviation Company	TWINARROW	Uzbekistan	
	TXD	Aerotaxis del Noroeste	TAXI OESTE	Mexico	
	TXF	Aerotaxis Alfe	ALFE	Mexico	
	TXI	Aereotaxis	AEREOTAXIS	Mexico	
	TZA	Aero Tomza	AERO TOMZA	Mexico	
	TZT	Air Zambezi	ZAMBEZI	Zimbabwe	
	UAG	Afra Airlines	AFRALINE	Ghana	
	UAR	Aerostar Airlines	AEROSTAR	Ukraine	
	UCK	Air Division of the Eastern Kazakhstan Region	GALETA	Kazakhstan	
U7	UGA	Air Uganda	UGANDA	Uganda	
	UED	Air LA	AIR L-A	United States	
6U	UKR	Air Ukraine	AIR UKRAINE	Ukraine	
	UMB	Air Umbria	AIR UMBRIA	Italy	
	UND	Atuneros Unidos de California	ATUNEROS UNIDOS	Mexico	
	USC	AirNet Express	STAR CHECK	United States	Renamed from US Check Airlines
	VNR	Avantair	AVANTAIR	United States	defunct
	VTG	Aviação Transportes Aéreos e Cargas	ATACARGO	Angola	
	WAS	Air-Watania		Iraq	
	AAJ	Alfa Airlines	ALFA SUDAN	Sudan	
KO	AER	Alaska Central Express	ACE AIR	United States	
	AAK	Alaska Island Air	ALASKA ISLAND	United States	
KH	AAH	Aloha Air Cargo	ALOHA	United States	
AQ	AAH	Aloha Airlines	ALOHA	United States	defunct; former IATA code: TS
AA	AAL	American Airlines	AMERICAN	United States	
	XFS	American Flight Service Systems		United States	
	XMG	AMS Group		Russia	
WD*	AAN	Amsterdam Airlines	AMSTEL	Netherlands	Former IATA code: FH*. ICAO code and call sign no longer allocated
	ABI	Antigua and Barbuda Airways	Anair	Antigua and Barbuda	defunct
HO	DJA	Antinea Airlines	ANTINEA	Algeria	defunct
	EDY	Apollo Air Services	SOLWAY	United Kingdom	Was VLL Limited
	SRY	As-Aero		Armenia	
OZ	AAR	Asiana Airlines	ASIANA	South Korea	
	XXX	ASL (Air Service Liege)		Belgium	
AG	ABR	ASL Airlines Ireland	CONTRACT	Ireland	Former IATA Code: AG; former names: Hunting Air Cargo Airlines, Air Contractors
	XJA	Assistance Aeroportuaire de L'Aeroport de Paris		France	
	AAE	Astec Air East	AIR EAST	United States	defunct
8V	ACP	Astral Aviation	ASTRAL CARGO	Kenya	
	AAP	Astro Air International	ASTRO AIR	Philippines	defunct
	ATT	Attawasol Airlines	ATTAWASOL AIR	Libya	
XM	XME	Australian airExpress	AUS-CARGO	Australia	
AO	AUZ	Australian Airlines	AUSTRALIAN	Australia	Subsidiary merged with Qantas
	VAI	Avalair	AIR AVALAIR	Serbia	
XP	VXP	Avelo Airlines	AVELO	United States	Former ICAO code: CXP; former names: Casino Express Airlines, Xtra Airways
VE	AVE	Avensa	AVENSA	Venezuela	defunct
	VRT	Averitt Air Charter	AVERITT	United States	
	VSC	AVESCA	AVESCA	Colombia	defunct
	AJF	Avia Consult Flugbetriebs	AVIACONSULT	Austria	
	VTT	Avia Trans Air Transport	VIATRANSPORT	Sudan	
6A	CHP	Aviacsa	AVIACSA	Mexico	
AV	AVA	Avianca	AVIANCA	Colombia	
A0	MCJ	Avianca Argentina	JETMAC	Argentina	Owned by Synergy Group
O6	ONE	Avianca Brasil	OCEAN AIR	Brazil	Owned by Synergy Group
2K	GLG	Avianca Ecuador	GALAPAGOS	Ecuador	Aerolíneas Galápagos SA
	XAV	Aviaprom Enterprises	AVIAPROM	Russia	
	AVB	Aviation Beauport	BEAUPAIR	United Kingdom	
	AVQ	Aviation Services, Inc.	AQUILINE	United States	
	ACJ	Avicon	AVICHARTER	Kenya	
	VSR	Aviostart AS	AVIOSTART	Bulgaria	
V5	VLI	Avolar Aerolíneas	AEROVOLAR	Mexico	defunct
	VSA	Avstar Aviation	STARBIRD	South Africa	
AD	AZU	Azul Brazilian Airlines	Azul	Brazil	

== IATA Traffic Conference Areas ==
The International Air Transport Association (IATA) divides the world into three areas called the Traffic Conference Areas (TCAs) for air travel purposes. These areas are used to define geographical boundaries for fare construction and other industry-related practices:

- Traffic Conference Area 1 (TC1) – this area includes the Americas, encompassing North America (the Caribbean, Central America, and Northern America) and South America.
- Traffic Conference Area 2 (TC2) – this area includes the EMEA region, encompassing Europe, the Middle East, and Africa (North Africa and Sub-Saharan Africa).
- Traffic Conference Area 3 (TC3) – this area includes the Asia–Pacific region, encompassing the rest of Asia (Central Asia, East Asia, North Asia, South Asia, and Southeast Asia) and Oceania.

Essentially, TC1 covers the "New World", while TC2 and TC3 together cover the "Old World" (Africa-Eurasia) and the "Land Down Under".

== See also ==
- IATA airport code
- ICAO airport code
