= Al-Dawood Air =

IATA	ICAO	Call sign
-	LIE	AL-DAWOOD AIR
- Founded: 2002
- Ceased operations: 2005
- Hubs: Lagos Murtala Muhammed Airport; Ostend-Bruges International Airport
- Headquarters: Lagos, Nigeria
- Website: http://www.aldawoodgroup.com/air_main.htm

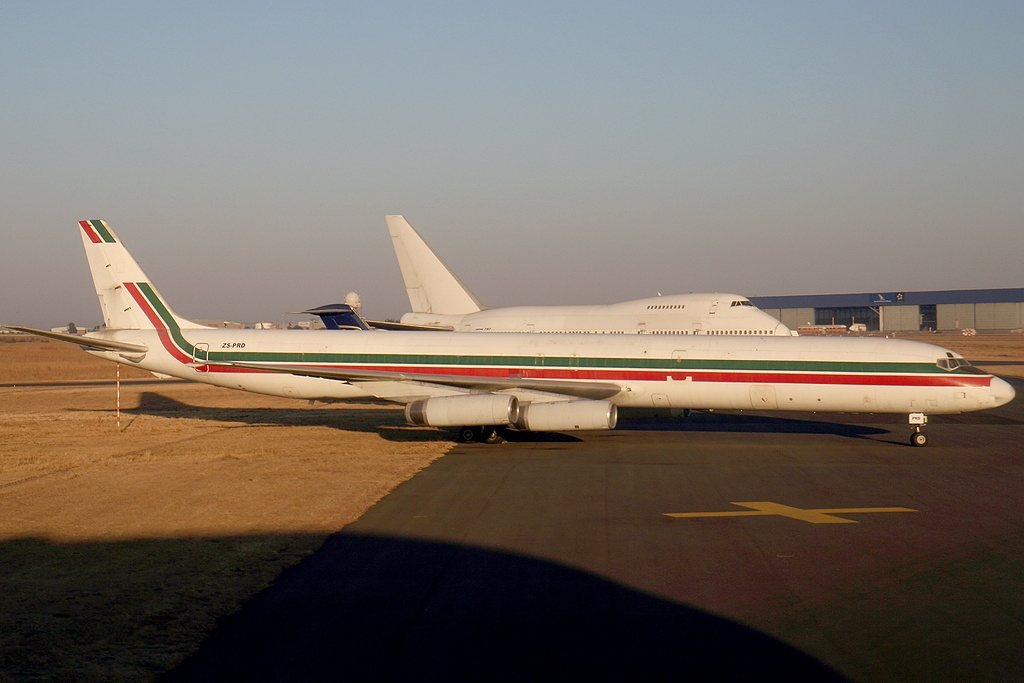
A McDonnell Douglas DC-8-63(F) airplane formerly used by Al-Dawood Air.

Al-Dawood Air was a cargo airline based in Lagos, Nigeria, operating worldwide cargo flights out of Ostend-Bruges International Airport, Belgium, and Murtala Mohammed International Airport, Lagos.

Al-Dawood Air was founded in 2002 as a subsidiary of the Al-Dawood Group, and ceased operations in 2005.

== Fleet ==
The Al-Dawood Air fleet consisted of only one Douglas DC-8 Series 63F aircraft.
