= Airstars =

Russian cargo airline

Airstars Аэростарз
IATA	ICAO	Call sign
PL	ASE	MOROZOV
- Founded: 2000
- Ceased operations: 2011
- Hubs: Domodedovo International Airport
- Fleet size: 7
- Destinations: 3
- Headquarters: Moscow, Russia
- Key people: Marat Vladimirovich Morozov (General Director)
- Website: www.airstars.ru

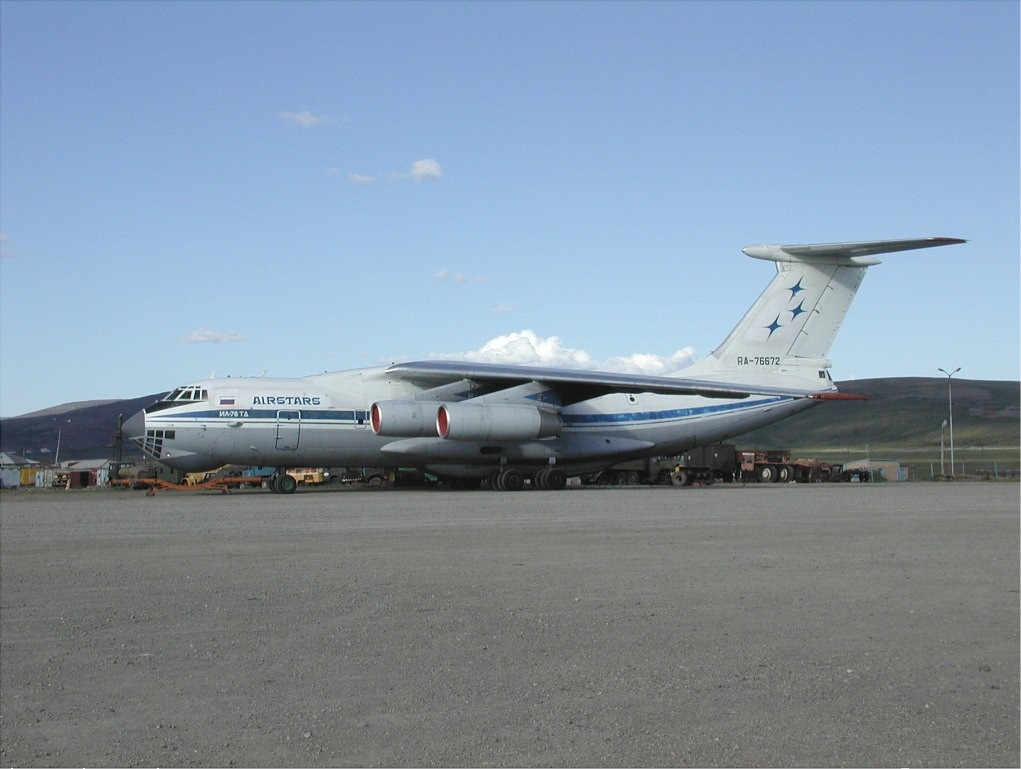
Ilyushin IL-76TD

Airstars, Ltd (Russian: ООО «Авиакомпания «Аэростарз») was a cargo airline based in Moscow, Russia. It was established in 2000 and operated cargo services throughout Russia and eastern Europe. Its main base was Domodedovo International Airport, Moscow. Its license was revoked in 2011 over safety violations regarding hours flown by each plane

== Fleet ==
The Airstars Airways fleet included the following aircraft (as of 2010)

Airstars Cargo fleet
Aircraft	Total	Notes
Ilyushin Il-62	3	stored
Tupolev Tu-214	3	
Ilyushin Il-76TD	3	
Ilyushin Il-96-300	1	
Total number of Aircraft	7	

== Liquidation ==
In 2017 the organization was liquidated.
