= Aeroclub Barcelona-Sabadell =

- Company type: Sport club (aeroclub)
- Industry: Flying training, aircraft maintenance, sports industry
- Predecessor: AeroClub Barcelona 1930 de Sabadell y del Vallés 1931
- Founded: July 27, 1953
- Headquarters: Aeroport de Sabadell LELL 08205 Sabadell, Barcelona, Spain
- Owner: Club members
- Website: aeroclub.es

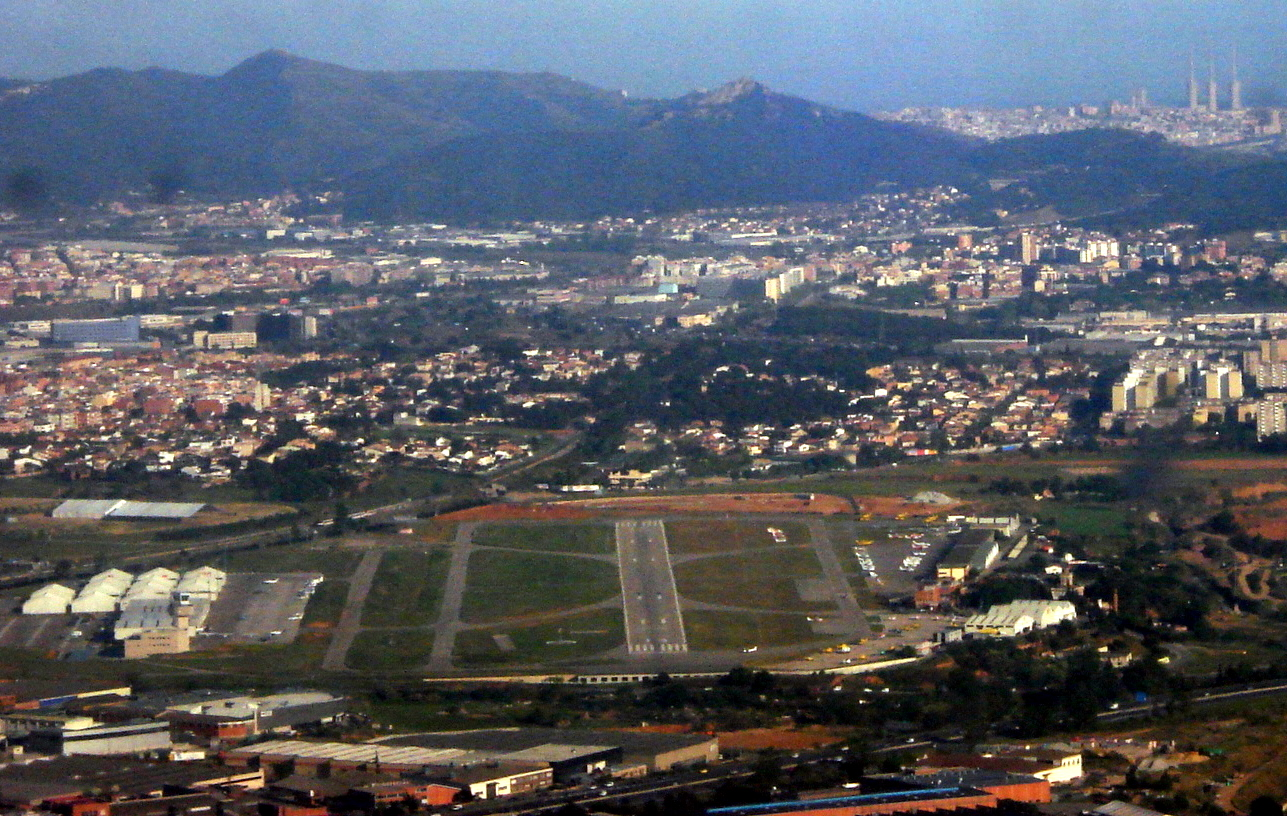
Airport Barcelona-Sabadell

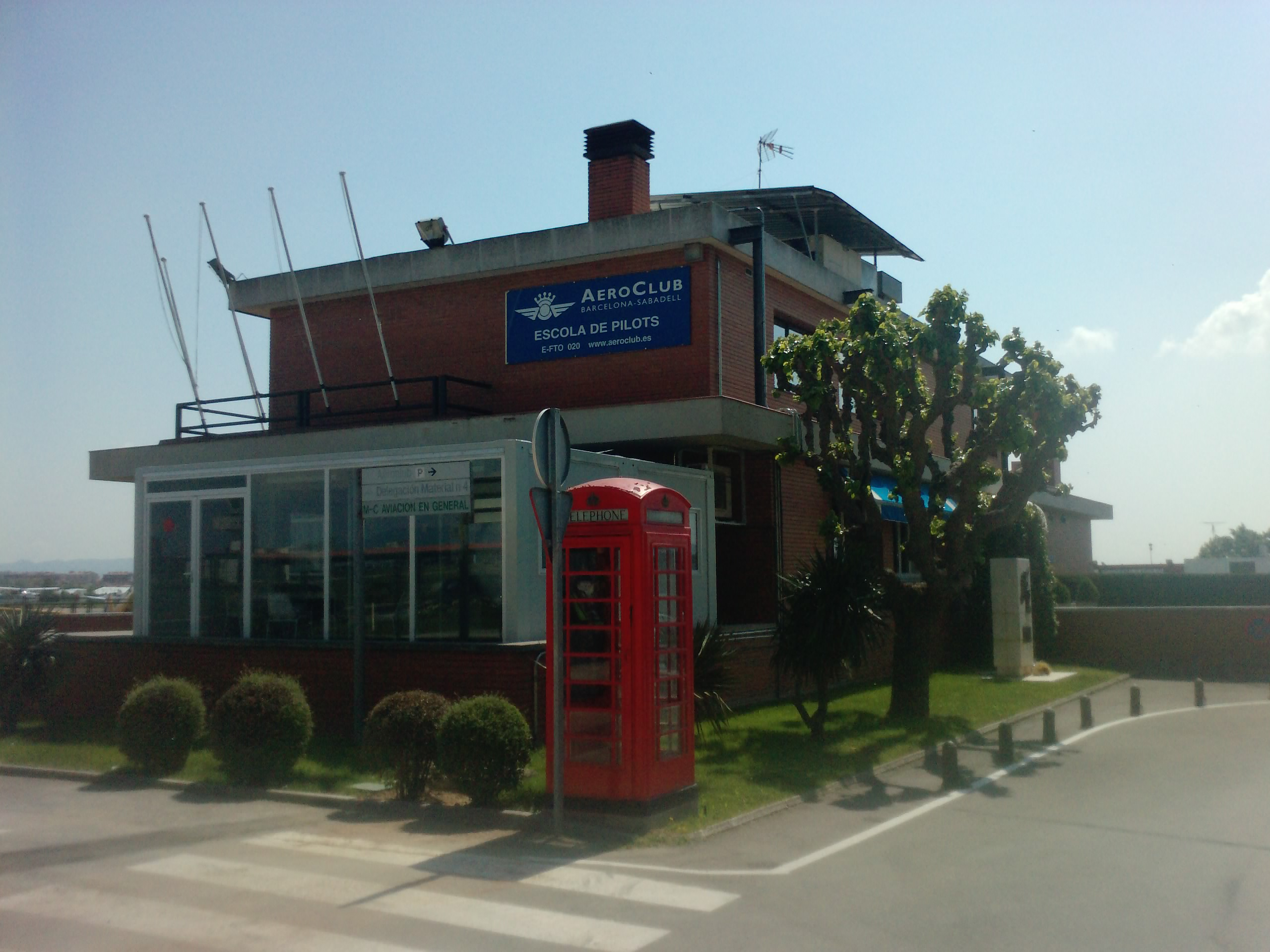
Aeroclub Barcelona-Sabadell

Aeroclub Barcelona-Sabadell is a major aeroclub founded in 1953, as a result of the union of two aviation clubs in Catalonia, Barcelona and Sabadell. The AeroClub Barcelona Sabadell carries out its activities at the Sabadell Airport (Barcelona) at the La Cerdaña Aerodrome (Gerona) and at the Seo de Urgell Airport (Lleida). Although it is at the Sabadell Airport where its headquarters are located, and where most of the activity of powered flight takes place.

== Fleet ==
AeroClub Barcelona-Sabadell fleet is made up of a total of 43 aircraft: 27 single-engine aircraft, 4 multi-engine aircraft, 3 helicopters, 3 aerobatic aircraft and 6 gliders.

== See also ==
- Aero Club Milano
- Letalski center Maribor
- Flying club
