= Aeropostal Cargo de México =

Aeropostal Cargo de Mexico
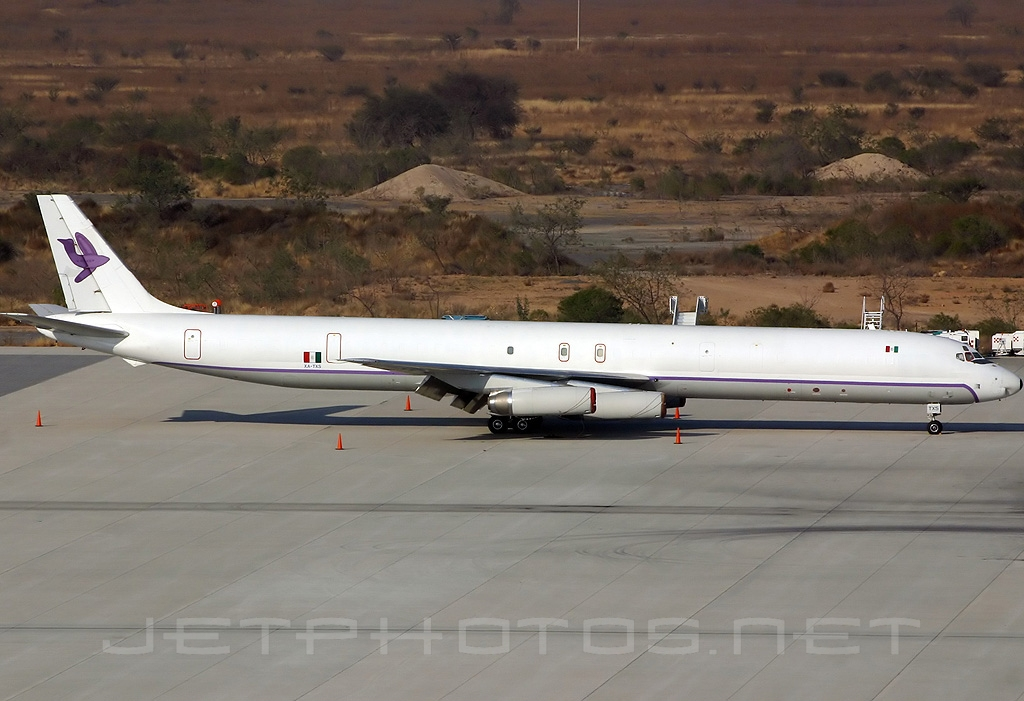
| IATA | ICAO | Call sign |
|---|---|---|
| - | PCG | POSTAL CARGO |
- Founded: 2001; 25 years ago
- Commenced operations: 2003; 23 years ago
- Ceased operations: 2010; 16 years ago
- Fleet size: 1
- Parent company: Aero Postal Cargo de México, S.A. de C.V.
- Headquarters: Mexico City, Mexico
- Key people: Mario Lazcano (Chief Executive)

Aeropostal Cargo de Mexico was a cargo airline based in Mexico City, Mexico, operating on-demand flights within the Americas using leased aircraft.

== History ==
The airline was founded by Jesus Villegas and started operations in Mexico City on September 6, 2001..

In 2010, the airline was shut down.

== Fleet ==
As of March 2010 the Aeropostal Cargo de Mexico fleet consisted of only one Douglas DC-8-63F aircraft.:
