= Auvia Air =

Cargo airline in Indonesia

IATA	ICAO	Call sign
–	UVT	AUVIA
- Founded: 2004
- Ceased operations: Unknown
- Fleet size: 1
- Headquarters: East Jakarta, Indonesia
- Website: —

Auvia Air was a small cargo airline based in East Jakarta, Indonesia. The airline was established in 2004, operating cargo services during the mid-2000s.

== Fleet ==
As of early 2005, Auvia Air operated the following aircraft:

- 1x Boeing 737-200 (cargo configuration)
