= Aerolimousine =

Russian airline

Aerolimousine Аэролимузин
IATA	ICAO	Call sign
-	LIN	AEROLIMOUSINE
- Founded: 1998
- Hubs: Domodedovo International Airport
- Headquarters: Moscow, Russia
- Key people: Aleksandr Mikhailovich Grishnov (General Director)
- Website: http://www.aerolimousine.ru/eng/

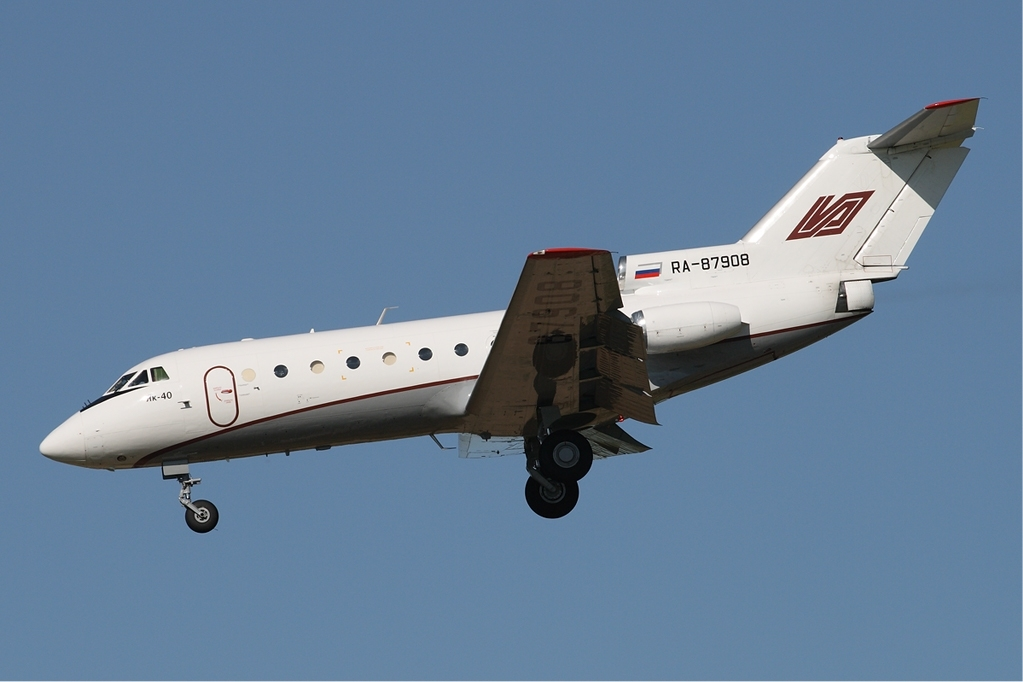
Aerolimousine Yakovlev Yak-40.

LLC "Aerolimousine" (Russian: ООО «Аэролимузин») is an airline based in Russia. It operates VIP charter flights and air-taxi services out of Moscow Domodedovo Airport.

== Fleet ==
As of July 2012 the Aerolimousine fleet included the following aircraft:

- 1 Hawker 125-700 (RA-02810)
- 3 Yakovlev Yak-40 (RA-87908, RA-87496, RA-87938)
