= Aero Africa =

Charter airline based in Swaziland

IATA	ICAO	Call sign
-	RFC	AERO AFRICA
- Founded: 2003
- Ceased operations: 2009
- Fleet size: 4
- Headquarters: Manzini, Swaziland

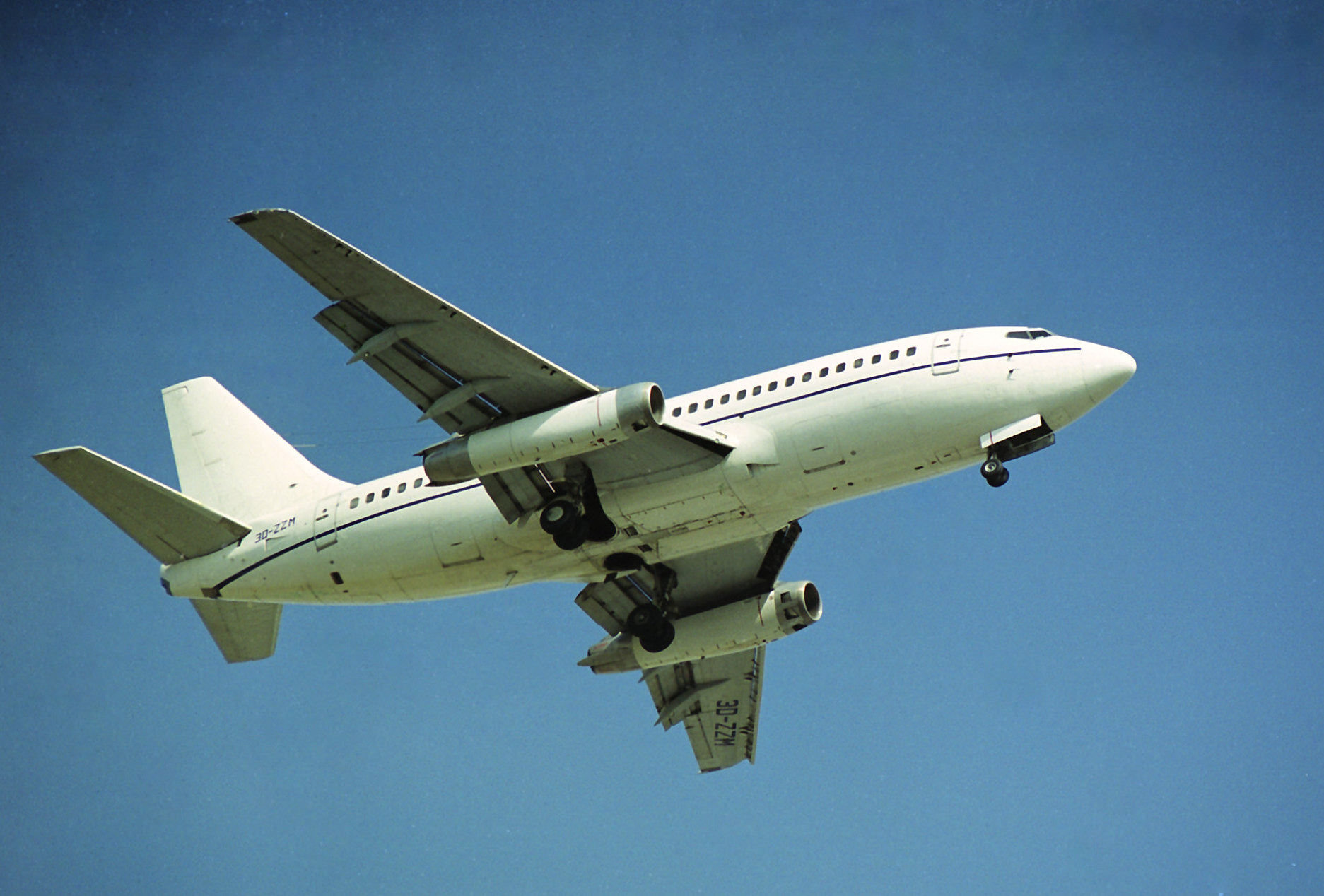

Aero Africa was a charter airline based in Eswatini. It operated from 2003 to 2009. In 2009, the airline was on the list of air carriers banned in the European Union, along with all other Swazi airlines.

== Fleet ==
The Aero Africa fleet consisted of the following aircraft:

- 1 Boeing 727-100
- 1 Boeing 737-200 (which is operated for Toumaï Air Tchad)
- 2 McDonnell-Douglas DC-10
