= ABC Air Hungary =

Cargo airline

IATA	ICAO	Call sign
–	AHU	ABC HUNGARY
- Founded: 1998
- Ceased operations: November 2015
- Operating bases: Budapest Ferenc Liszt International Airport
- Fleet size: 2
- Headquarters: Budapest, Hungary

ABC Air Hungary Kft. was a Hungarian cargo airline based at Budapest with its head office at Budapest Ferenc Liszt International Airport.

== History ==
Founded in 1998, the company operated scheduled cargo flights with Let L-410 Turbolet, Saab 340, ATR 42, Airbus A300 and Boeing 737 freight aircraft. The airline signed a contract with DHL in 2001 followed by cooperations with TNT and United Parcel Service in 2003. It also operated on behalf of other freight and logistics companies as well as ad-hoc charter flights. In May 2010, the aircraft fleet consisted of three Let L-410 Turbolet. The airline ceased operations in November 2015.

== Fleet ==
As of November 2014, the fleet of ABC Air Hungary consisted of the following aircraft:

ABC Air Hungary fleet
Aircraft	In service	Orders	Notes
Saab 340	2	–	
Total	2	—	
