= Asia Avia Airlines =

Airline based in Jakarta, Indonesia

IATA	ICAO	Call sign
—	AVT	Asiavia
- Founded: 2003
- Commenced operations: 2003
- Ceased operations: 2006
- Operating bases: Polonia International Airport, Medan, Indonesia
- Fleet size: Two Fokker F27 Friendships
- Destinations: Malacca; Pekan Baru; Jambi
- Parent company: PT Asia Avia Megamata
- Headquarters: Jakarta, Indonesia

Asia Avia Airlines (Asia Avia Megatama P.T.) was an airline based in Jakarta, Indonesia. It operated scheduled domestic passenger services from Malacca to Pekan Baru and Jambi, using a fleet of two Fokker F27 Friendship aircraft. Its main base was Polonia International Airport, Medan.

== Code data ==
- ICAO code: AVT
- Callsign: ASIAVIA

== History ==
Asia Avia Airlines was established and started operations in 2003. It was wholly owned by PT Asia Avia Megamata. In 2006, all flight operations were suspended and the licence was withdrawn. In February 2007, the Transportation Ministry delayed the license revocation of 11 idle airlines, including Asia Avia Airlines, to give restructuring opportunities to the operators, which did not materialize.
