= Alexandair =

IATA	ICAO	Call sign
-	AXN	ALEXANDROS
- Founded: 2004
- Ceased operations: 2007
- Hubs: Heraklion International Airport
- Fleet size: 2
- Headquarters: Athens, Greece
- Key people: Vasilis Chardalopoulos
- Website: http://www.alexandair.com/

Alexandair was a charter airline headquartered in Athens, Greece. It operated charter services on a wet-lease basis for major tour operators. Its main base was Heraklion International Airport. The airline suspended operations in September 2007.

== History ==
The airline company was founded in 2004 with the objective to execute air transport of passengers and cargo. Founder of the airline is Capt. Theodore Kokmotos, president and managing director.

2005: After the completion of all the procedures with the Hellenic Civil Aviation (HCAA), the airline obtained the two certificates (Air Operator Certificate and Operating License) and leased an aircraft Boeing MD-82 of 161 seats.

Since May 2005 until 2008 the company operates charter flights, in cooperation with the biggest tour operators, mostly from airports of Greek islands to several European destinations.

During the winter period 2005–2006 operated charter flights connecting North Iraq with European cities.

During the winter period 2006–2007 operated charter flights based at Nairobi of Kenya to other capitals of Africa.

== Destinations ==
Alexandair operated charter services from Chania, Corfu, Heraklion, Kos, Thessaloniki, Rhodes and Erbil in North Iraq and Nairobi in Kenya.

== Fleet ==
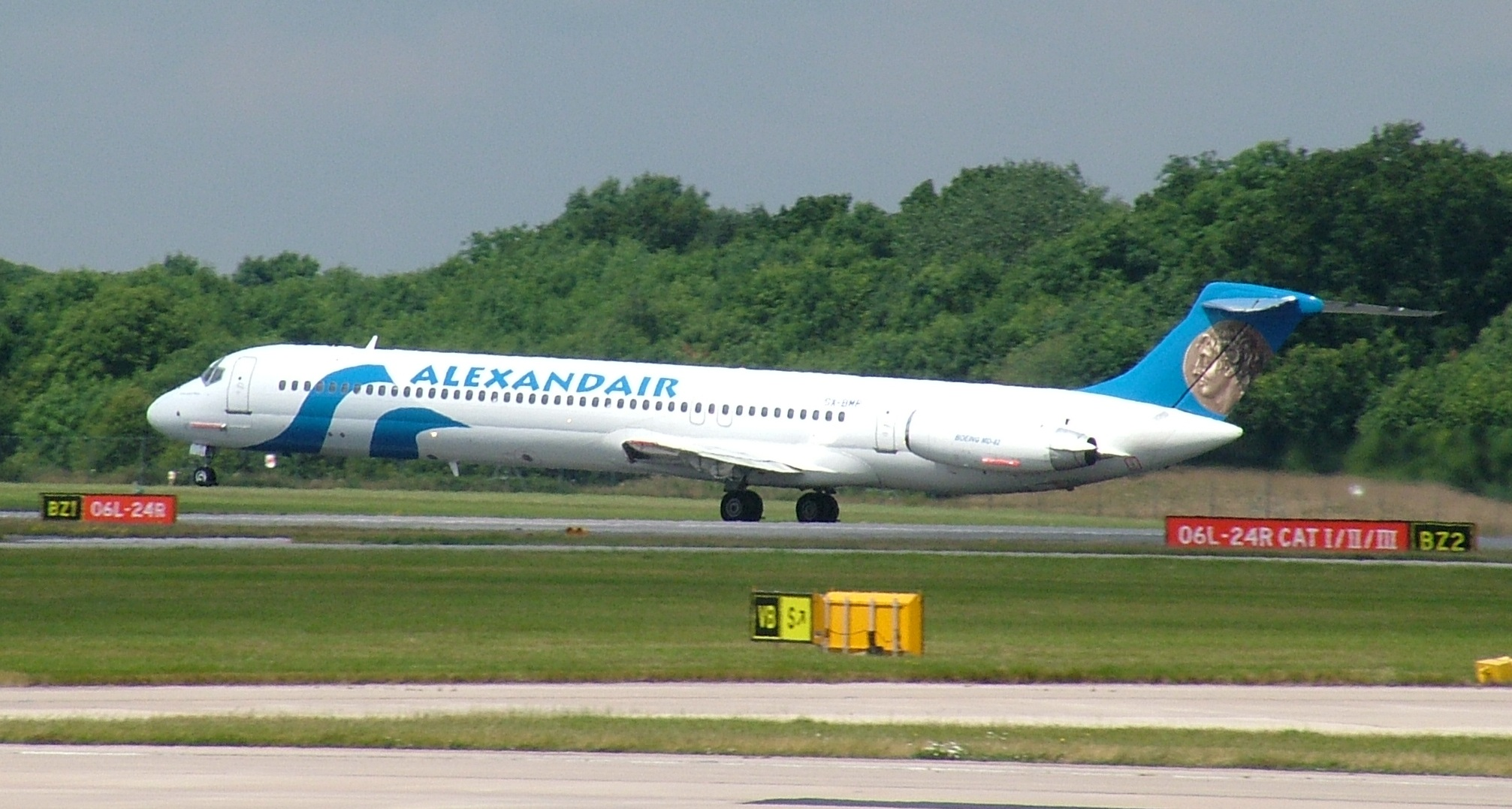
Alexandair MD82

- 1 McDonnell Douglas MD-82 (SX-BMP)
- 1 McDonnell Douglas MD-83
