= Astrakhan Airlines =

Russian airline (1994–2005)

IATA	ICAO	Call sign
OB	ASZ	Air Astrakhan
- Founded: 1994
- Ceased operations: 2005
- Hubs: Narimanovo Airport
- Fleet size: 1
- Headquarters: Astrakhan, Russia
- Key people: Vladimir Stepanovich (General Director)

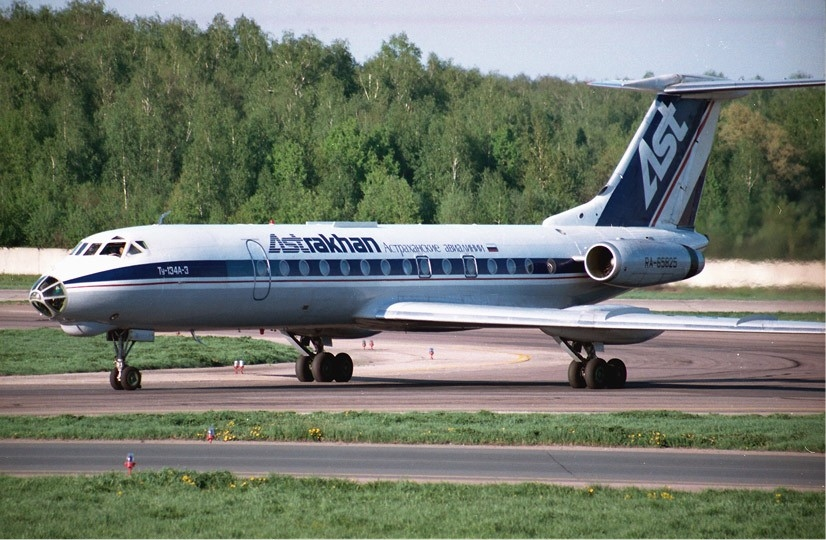
Astrakhan Airlines Tupolev Tu-134, Moscow, 2001

Astrakhan Airlines was an airline based in Astrakhan, Russia. It operated scheduled and chartered, domestic and international passenger and cargo flights out of Narimanovo Airport, Astrakhan.

== History ==
Astrakhan Airlines was established in 1994 and was owned by the Board of Directors (65%), the local Concrete Structures Plant (a Gazprom subsidiary) (25%) and employees and investors (10%). In 2005, the airline was shut down.

== Fleet ==
The Astrakhan Airlines fleet consisted of only one Tupolev Tu-134 aircraft.
