= Aviast Air =

Russian cargo airline

Aviast Air Авиаст Эйр
IATA	ICAO	Call sign
6I	VVA	IALSI
- Founded: 1992
- Ceased operations: 2011
- Operating bases: Domodedovo International Airport; Yaroslavl Airport
- Fleet size: 4
- Headquarters: Moscow, Russia
- Key people: Khadim-Kurat Khalilovich Khalimov (General Director)
- Website: http://www.aviast.ru (defunct)

Aviast Air Ltd. (Russian: ООО «Авиакомпания «АВИАСТ ЭЙР») was a cargo airline based in Moscow, Russia. It operated scheduled and chartered services throughout Russia and the CIS mainly out of Domodedovo International Airport or, to a lesser extent, Yaroslavl Airport. The company was founded in 1992 and liquidated in 2011.

== Fleet ==
The Aviast fleet included the following aircraft (at March 2007):

- 1 Antonov An-12
- 2 Ilyushin Il-76TD

=== Previously operated ===
As of August 2006, Aviast had also operated the following aircraft:

- 2 Antonov An-12
- 1 Ilyushin Il-76MD
- 1 Ilyushin Il-76TD
