= Aeroland Airways =

Greek charter airline based in Athens, Greece

IATA	ICAO	Call sign
3S	AEN	AEROLAND
- Founded: 2005
- Ceased operations: 2012
- AOC #: GR-022
- Hubs: Athens International Airport
- Fleet size: 5
- Headquarters: Athens, Greece
- Website: https://web.archive.org/web/20080602174050/http://www.aeroland.gr:80/

Aeroland Airways was a Greek charter airline based in Athens, Greece. It operated cargo flights between Athens and several domestic destinations. Aeroland was founded in 2005 and suspended operations in late 2012.

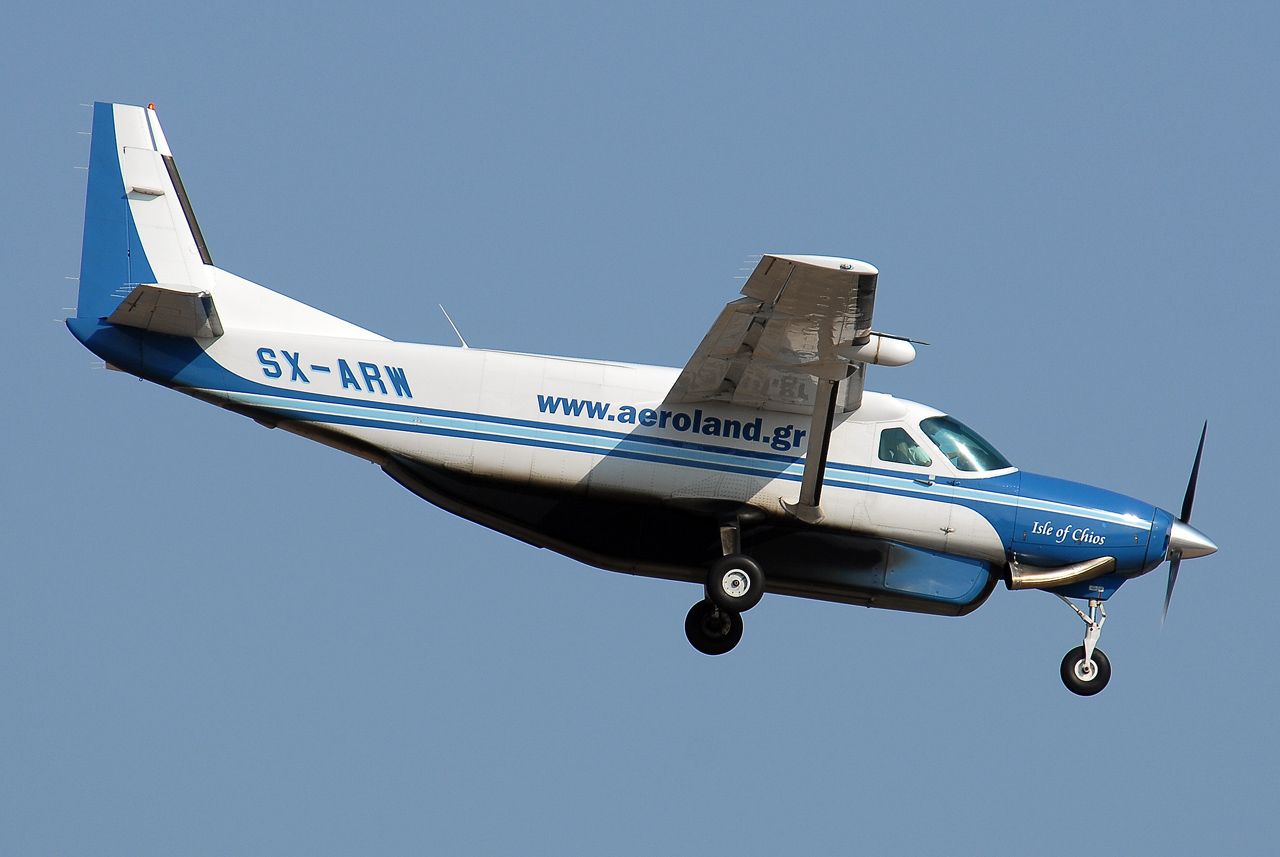
SX-ARW is one of the four Cessna 208s

== Fleet ==
The Aeroland Airways fleet:

- 1 × Bombardier Dash 8 Q100
- 4 × Cessna 208 Caravan
