= Aero Tropical =

Airline of Angola

IATA	ICAO	Call sign
-	TPB	AERO TROPICAL
- Founded: 1996
- Ceased operations: 1999
- Headquarters: Angola

Aero Tropical, also known as Air Tropical, was an airline based in Angola. It was founded in 1996 and shut down in 1999.

== Accidents and incidents ==
- On 27 February 1996 at 05:40 local time, an Aero Tropical Antonov An-12 cargo aircraft (registered ER-ACE) crashed during a poor-visibility approach into Lucapa Airport following a flight from Luanda. All eight persons aboard the aircraft were killed.
