= List of defunct airlines of Argentina =

This is a list of defunct airlines of Argentina.

Airline	Image	IATA	ICAO	Callsign	Commenced operations	Ceased operations	Notes
A
Aero 2000		4M	DSM		2004	2005	Became LAN Argentina
Aero Gaucho					1997	1998	Operated Fokker F28
Aero Servicios Errecaborde					1963	1965	Operated Boeing PT-17 Stearman, de Havilland Dragon Rapide, Curtiss C-46
Aerocassa					2001	2001	Operated Swearingen Merlin II
Aerochaco		VM	PRV	DESCONOCIDO	2008	2013	Operated BAe Jetstream 32
AeroChaco (Líneas Aéreas Chaqueñas)		CQ			2001	2001	Privatized and renamed to ALFA (Aerolínea Federal Argentina). Operated DHC-2 Beaver, DHC-6 Twin Otter, Fokker F27
Aerocondor Argentina					1993	1996	Operated Swearingen Merlin
Aerolínea Federal Argentina		CQ	FED	ALFA	1985	1990	Operated DHC-6 Twin Otter, Fairchild F27
Aerolíneas Carreras Transportes Aereos (ACTA)					1959	1970	Operated Curtiss C-46, Lockheed Constellation
Aerolíneas Ini Cia					1957	1964	Founded by José Ini. Operated Douglas DC-4, Douglas DC-6
Aerinorte					1955	1959	Operated Beech Bonanza, Cessna T-50, DHC-2 Beaver, Lockheed 10 Electra
Aeropalas					1971	1974	Operated Douglas DC-4
Aeroplane Co					1963	1963	Operated Curtiss C-46
Aeroposta			RPO	AEROPOSTA	1987	1993	
Aeroposta Argentina		PO	RPO	AEROPOSTA	1928	1949	Merged with Aviación del Litoral Fluvial Argentino, Flota Aérea Mercante Argentina and Zonas Oeste y Norte de Aerolíneas Argentinas to form Aerolíneas Argentinas
AeroSur				AEROSUR	1970	1971	Reorganized as Aeroplasa SA. Operated Douglas DC-4
Aerosur Patagonia			PTG	PATAGONIA	1994	1995	Established as Air Patagonia ̵ Lineas Aereas del Sur
Aerotransportes Entre Rios		RS	SFA	AERSA	1962	1981	Operated Bristol Britannia, Canadair CL-44, Curtiss C-46, Lockheed Constellation
Aerotransportes Litoral Argentino		SG		ALA	1957	1971	Operated BAC 1-11, Curtiss C-46, Douglas DC-3, Douglas DC-4, NAMC YS-11
Aerotransportes Wollkopf					1957	2009	Operated Cessna Caravan, Rockwell 680
Aerovias Buenos Aires					1956	1968	Operated Curtiss C-46
Aerovias Halcon					1963	1971	Established as Transportes Aereos Mirleni. Operated Curtiss C-46
Aerovias Monder					1955	1957	Integrated into Aerotransportes Litoral Argentino. Operated Avro Anson, Beech AT-11 Kansan, Curtiss C-46, Fairchild C-82 Packet, Lockheed Lodestar
Aerovias Pancontinental					1963	1971	Established as Lloyds Aereo Pancontinental. Operated Curtiss C-46
Aerovip		2D	AOG	AVIP	1999	2010	Operated BAe Jetstream 31
Aerunion					1956	1964	Operated Curtiss C-46
Air Plus Argentina		U3	LMP	AIR FLIGHT	1998	2002	Operated Boeing 747
AIRG					2002	2002	Renamed to Líneas Aéreas Privadas Argentinas
Airman			AYM	AIRMAN	1999	2006	Operated Swearingen Merlin
AL Carreras Transportes Aéreos					1959	1967	Operated Lockheed Constellation
Alas del Sur					1995	1999	Operated Swearingen Merlin, Swearingen Metro, Fairchild F27
Alas del Sur					2016	2018	Rebranded as JetSmart Argentina. Operated Airbus A320-200
All Borders Airlines					2003	2005	Operated Swearingen Merlin
ALTA Lineas Aereas			LGN	ALTA ARGENTINA	1996	1998	Operated Beech 1900, Fairchild F-27, DHC-8
American Falcon		WK	AFB	AMERICAN FALCON	1996	2005	Operated Boeing 737-200
Andesmar Lineas Aereas		CK	NDR	ANDESMAR	1995	1998	Operated Saab 340
ARG Argentina Línea Privada		MJ	LPR		2001	2002	Renamed once again as Líneas Aéreas Privadas Argentinas
Arjet Airlines					2010	2014	
Austral		AU	AUT	AUSTRAL	1957	1971	Renamed to Austral Lineas Aéreas
Aviación del Litoral Fluvial Argentino (ALFA)					1946	1949	Merged with Aerolineas Aeroposta, Flota Aérea Mercante Argentina and Zonas Oeste y Norte de Aerolíneas Argentinas to form Aerolíneas Argentinas
Avianca Argentina		A0	ANC	AVIAN	2016	2019	
C
Cardinal Líneas Aéreas			SYA		2001	2004	
CATA Línea Aérea			CTZ	CATA	1986	2006	
Charter Fly					1991	1995	
Compañía Argentina de Aeronavegación Dodero					1945	1946	To Aerolíneas Argentinas
Compañía Argentina de Cargas Aereas Internacionales					1950	1955	Operated Curtiss C-46
Compañía Austral de Transportes Aéreos SACI (CATASACI)					1958	1971	To Austral Líneas Aéreas. Operated BAC 1-11, Curtiss C-46, Douglas DC-6, NAMC YS-11
Compañía Rio Platense de Aviación					1921	1924	Formed by the merger of Compañía Franco Argentina de Transportes Aéreos and River Plate Aviation Company
D
Dinar Líneas Aéreas		D7	RDN	AERO DINAR	1992	2002	
E
El Pingüino Líneas Aéreas					1993	1995	Operated Aero Commander 500B, CASA Aviocar, Cessna Skylane
F
Flota Aérea Mercante Argentina					1946	1949	Merged with Aerolineas Aeroposta, Aviación del Litoral Fluvial Argentino and Zonas Oeste y Norte de Aerolíneas Argentinas to form Aerolíneas Argentinas
Flyest					2017	2020	Subsidiary of Air Nostrum. Operated Bombardier CRJ100
I
Inter Austral					1997	1999	Established as Austral Express. Operated CASA CN235
K
Kaiken Lineas Aéreas		F7	KJI		1990	1999	
L
LAN Argentina		4M	DSM	LANAR	2005	2016	Renamed to LATAM Argentina
LASA Líneas Aéreas		L4	NQN	LASA	2014	2018	Operated Embraer ERJ 145
LATAM Argentina		4M	DSM	LANAR	2016	2020	
Leal Lineas Aéreas					2008	2012	Operated MD-83
Línea Aérea Nordeste					1930	1945	merged with Línea Aérea Sud Oeste to become LADE
Línea Aérea Sud Oeste					1930	1945	merged with Línea Aérea Nordeste to become LADE
Lineas Aéreas Chaquenas		CQ		Lineas Aéreas Chaquenas	1957	1985	Merged to Aerolinea Federal Argentina
Línea Aérea de Entre Ríos		2L			1980	2002	
Líneas Aéreas Comerciales al Sur					1949	1952	Operated Curtiss C-46, Douglas DC-3
Líneas Aéreas de Cuyo					1957	1961	Operated Convair 340, Curtiss C-46, Douglas DC-3
Líneas Aéreas del Sur			LDS	LINSUR	2009	2012	
Líneas Aéreas Federales		A4	FED		2003	2005	
Líneas Aéreas Patagonica Argentina					1960	1965	Operated Aero Commander 690, Curtiss C-46, Lockheed Constellation
Líneas Aéreas Privadas Argentinas		MJ	LPR		1977	2001	Renamed/merged to: ARG Argentina Línea Privada
Líneas Aéreas Privadas Argentinas		MJ	LPR		2002	2003	Renamed from ARG Argentina Línea Privada in 2002; went bankrupt in 2003
Líneas Aéreas Provinciales de Entre Rios					1969	1979	
Líneas Aéreas Santafecinas					1989	1990	Operated CASA Aviocar
Líneas Aéreas Williams					1990	1999	Operated Swearingen Merlin
M
Macair Jet		IA;A0	MCJ		1995	2017	Became Avianca Argentina
N
NorSur					1959	1961	Founded by Eduardo Buschiazzo. Operated Lockheed Lodestar
Norwegian Air Argentina		DN	NAA	NORUEGA	2018	2020	
P
Primera Linea Aerea Santefesina					1957	1966	Operated Douglas DC-3, Lockheed Lodestar, Lockheed L.10 Electra
R
River Plate Airlines					1970s	1970s	Livestock transport. Operated Canadair CL-44
S
SAPSE					1990	2003	Operated Aero Commander 690, Swearingen Merlin
Senma					1998	1999	Operated Fairchild Swearingen Metro III
Servicios Aéreos Bahienses					1990	1999	Operated Piper Navajo, Piper Seneca
Servicios Aéreos Rio Negro					1968	1972	Operated Douglas DC-3
Servicios Aéreos Santa Isabel					1962	1978	Subsidiary company of Industrias Kaiser Argentina. Operated Douglas DC-3
Servicios de Transportes Aéreos Fueguinos		FS	STU	FUEGUINO	1985	2005	
Silver Sky Airlines			SIK		2006	2008	Operated Boeing 737-200
Skyways Argentina			SYA	LINEAS CARDINAL	2004	2005	Established as Cardinal Lineas. Operated Boeing 737-200
Sociedad Argentina Linea de Transporte Aéreo					1956	1961	Operated Cessna T-50
Sociedad Argentina de Navegación Aérea					1940	1943	Operated Consolidated Commodore, Sikorsky S-38
Sol Líneas Aéreas		8R	OLS	FLIGHT SOL	2005	2016	Went bankrupt.
Southern Winds Airlines		A4	SWD	SOUTHERN WINDS	1996	2005	
STAF Servicios de Transportes Aereos Fueguinos		FS	STU	FUEGUINO	1985	2005	Operated Boeing 707, Boeing 727, L-188 Electra, MD-11
Sudamericana de Aviación					1993	1996	Operated Boeing 707, Boeing 737, BAe 125, Fokker F27
T
TAL Trader Airlines					1997	1999	Operated Fairchild Swearingen Metro II
Trabajos Aéreos y Representaciones					1960	1962	Operated Bell 47
Trabajos y Fe Transportes Aéreos		VV			1976	1977	Operated Convair 240, Douglas DC-8
TRAFE Airways		HR	HRT		1971	1977	
Trans American Air Transport					1960	1961	Operated Curtis C-46
Trans Atlantica Argentina					1960	1962	
Transcontinental SA					1956	1961	Operated Bristol Britannia, Curtiss C-46, Lockheed Super Constellation
Transportes Aéreo Costa Atlántica					1956	1999	Operated Cessna 310, Fairchild C-82, Fairchild Swearingen Metro II, Piper Apache
Transporte Aéreo de Catamarca					1993	1999	Operated Swearingen Merlin
Transportes Aéreo Costa Atlántica					1960	1961	Operated Douglas DC-6, Noorduyn Norseman
Transporte Aéreo Rioplatense		HR	HRT		1970	1989	
Transportes Aéreos Latin America					1970	1970	Operated Douglas DC-6B
Transportes Aéreos Mirleni					1958	1963	Operated Curtiss C-46, Douglas DC-4, Douglas C-54
Transportes Aéreos Neuquen		T8	NEQ	NEUQUINO	1972	2003	Established as Líneas Aéreas del Neuquén. Operated Aero Commander 690, Saab 340, Swearingen Merlin IV
Transportes Aéreos Terrestres y Maritimo					1962	1964	Operated Douglas DC-2
U
Union Air Cargo					1961	1965	
Z
Zonas Oeste y Norte de Aerolíneas Argentinas					1946	1949	Merged with Aerolineas Aeroposta, Flota Aérea Mercante Argentina and Aviación del Litoral Fluvial Argentino to form Aerolíneas Argentinas

== See also ==
- List of airlines of Argentina
- List of airports in Argentina
