= Líneas Aéreas Entre Ríos =

Airline in Argentina, 1980–2002

LAER
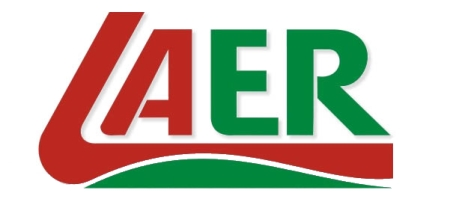
IATA	ICAO	Call sign
2L	-	LAER
- Founded: 1980
- Ceased operations: April 19, 2002
- Hubs: Aeroparque Jorge Newbery
- Secondary hubs: General Justo José de Urquiza Airport
- Fleet size: 3
- Destinations: 6
- Headquarters: Paraná, Argentina
- Website: www.laersa.com.ar

LAER - Líneas Aéreas Entre Ríos was an Argentine airline based in Paraná, Entre Ríos, Argentina.

== Destinations ==
LAER operated the following services (as of April 2013):

Argentina

- Buenos Aires - Aeroparque Jorge Newbery Hub
- Concordia - Comodoro Pierrestegui Airport
- Goya - Goya Airport
- Mercedes - Mercedes Airport
- Paraná - General Justo José de Urquiza Airport Hub
- Reconquista - Daniel Jukic Airport

== Fleet ==
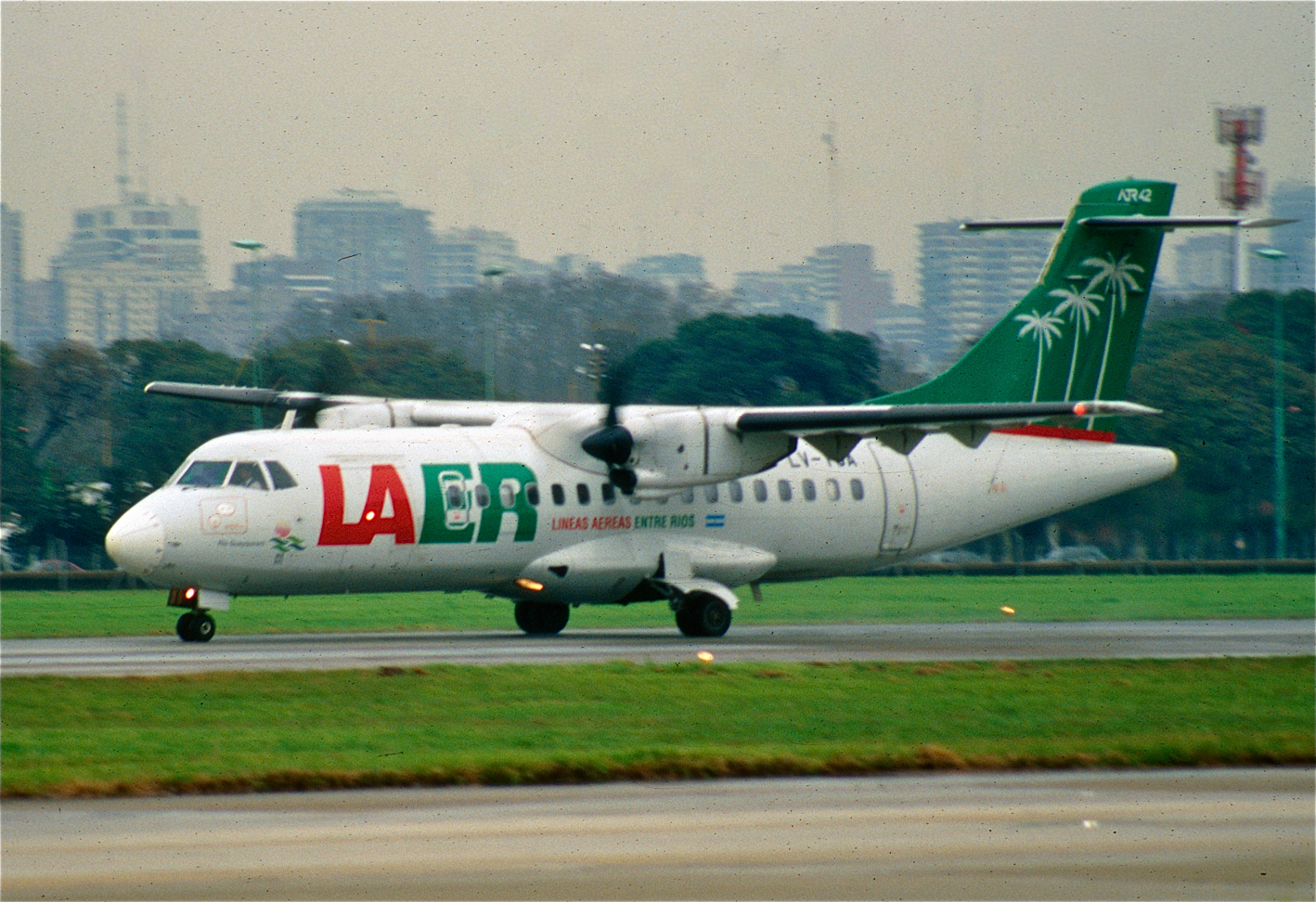
A LAER ATR 42-300 taxiing at Aeroparque Jorge Newbery in 2000

The fleet of LAER consisted of the following aircraft:

LAER fleet
Aircraft	Total	Introduced	Retired	Notes
ATR 42-300	1	1998	2003	
ATR 42-320	1	1999	2003	
BAe Jetstream 32	4	1992	2002	
Cessna 402	2	1992	1995	
Cessna 411	1	1992	1999	
Fairchild F-27	1	2002	2003	Leased from CATA Línea Aérea
FMA IA 50 Guaraní II	2	1986	1994	
Fokker F28 Fellowship	1	2002	2003	Leased from Argentine Air Force and operated by American Falcon
Saab 340A	1	1987	1989	

== See also ==
- List of defunct airlines of Argentina
