= Líneas Aéreas Federales =

Argentine domestic airline

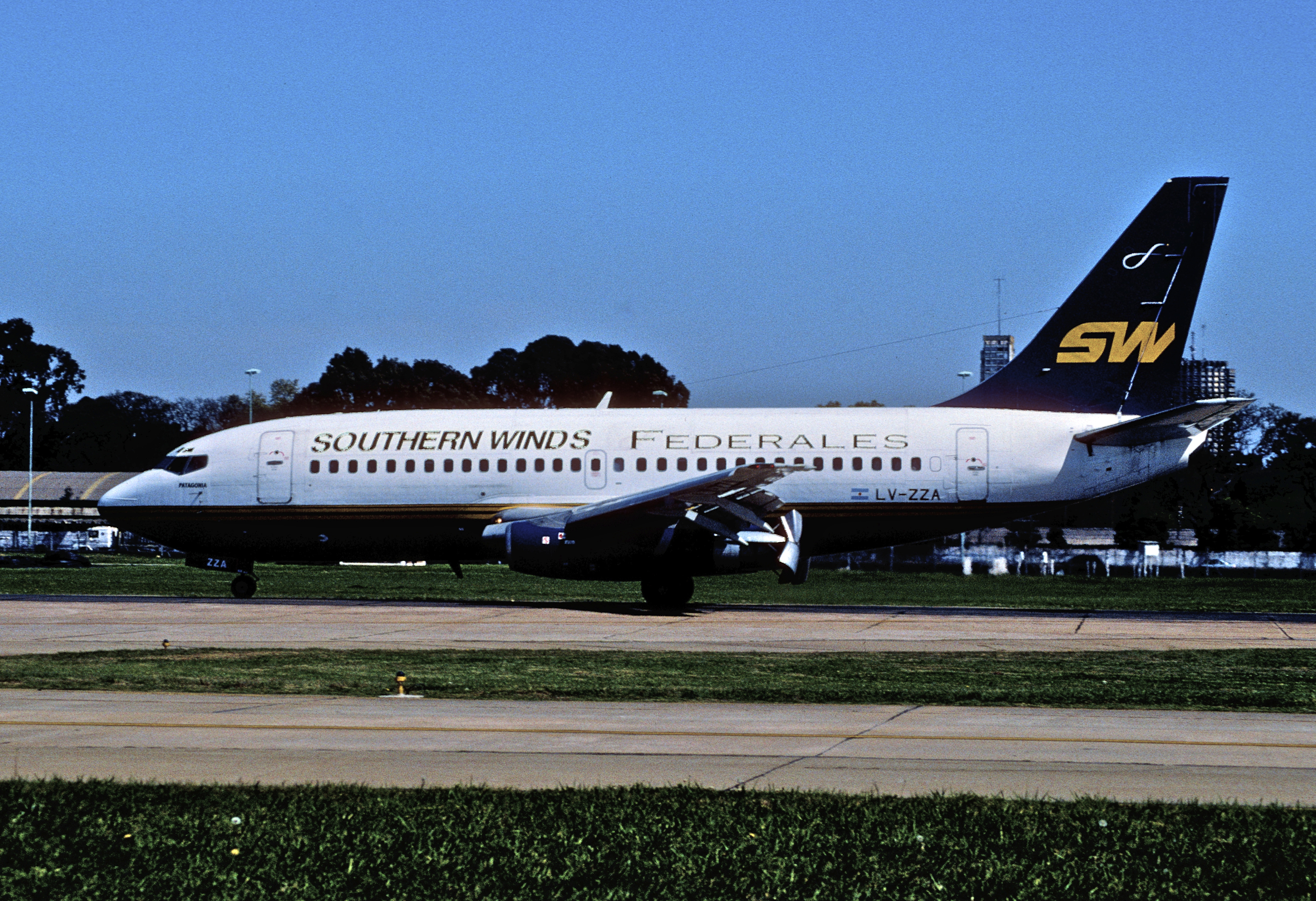
- A Southern Winds Boeing 737-200, with the Federales titles in 2004
IATA	ICAO	Call sign
—	FED	FEDERALES
- Founded: May 21, 2003
- Ceased operations: 2005
- Alliance: Southern Winds Airlines
- Parent company: Government of Argentina
- Headquarters: Buenos Aires, Argentina
- Employees: ~850 (2005)

Líneas Aéreas Federales S.A. (LAFSA for short) was a state-owned airline operating domestic services based in Buenos Aires, Argentina. Its flights were operated by other local airlines.

== History ==
The airline was established on May 21, 2003, by the Argentinian government to absorb the workers of two bankrupt airlines Líneas Aéreas Privadas Argentinas (LAPA), and Dinar Líneas Aéreas. It was owned by the Federal Planning Ministry (40%), the Ministry of Economy (40%), and Intercargo (20%).

The company did not actually have any planes of its own. Later in September 2003, LAFSA signed an agreement with Southern Winds Airlines, another private carrier, to keep afloat by providing its routes and staff in exchange for using Southern Winds' fleet. LAFSA began operations under this agreement on October 2, 2003, while Southern Winds continued to fly under their colours. Yet another Argentine airline, Aerovip, was also absorbed over those same years.

In March 2005, the Chilean flagship LAN Airlines reached an agreement with the Argentine government to absorb all workers of LAFSA. LAN took over LAFSA's routes and agreed to help Southern Winds for at least 90 days as well. It was at this point that LAN Argentina began. Since then, Southern Winds completely disappeared, with LAN Argentina replacing them and LAFSA.

LAFSA would keep the structure that was not absorbed by LAN Argentina, even with people in charge with clients, a marketing manager, pilots and copilots, until its liquidation in November 2009.

== See also ==
- List of defunct airlines of Argentina
