= Silver Sky Airlines =

Argentinian airline

IATA	ICAO	Call sign
-	SIK	SILVERSKY
- Founded: 2006
- Ceased operations: 2008
- Hubs: Aeroparque Jorge Newbery
- Fleet size: 1
- Destinations: 3 (planned)
- Headquarters: Mendoza, Argentina
- Website: www.silversky.com.ar

Silver Sky Airlines (Silver Sky Líneas Aéreas S.A.) was a proposed regional airline based in Mendoza, Argentina, founded by businessman Ricardo Lasmartres to address a severe capacity shortage in the country's domestic aviation market. Conceived around 2006 following the financial collapse of several prominent Argentine carriers, the airline planned to operate a comprehensive domestic network centered around hubs in Mendoza, Córdoba, and Buenos Aires. However, plagued by continuous launch delays, weak charter demand, and government-regulated fares that heavily favored subsidized competitors, Silver Sky suffered severe financial losses and ceased operations in 2008.

== History ==
Silver Sky was founded by Ricardo Lasmartres, a businessman from Mendoza, Argentina. He was aspiring to establish the province's first locally based airline in Mendoza. The company's formation was largely driven by a severe capacity shortage within the Argentine domestic aviation market. This void resulted directly from the financial collapse of several prominent regional carriers, including Líneas Aéreas Privadas Argentinas, Southern Winds Airlines, American Falcon, and Dinar Líneas Aéreas.

Furthermore, a lack of regional flight options has led to frequent delays across the country's aviation sector. To address these infrastructural gaps, Lasmartres positioned Silver Sky as a regional carrier, initially projecting a 2007 route network connecting Mendoza, Córdoba, and Buenos Aires.

Following a series of delays since 2006, the airline ceased operations in 2008 due to financial losses. Despite infrastructure investments in Mendoza and Córdoba, the carrier was undermined by weak charter demand and government-regulated fares that heavily favored subsidized competitors such as Aerolíneas Argentinas. Unable to cover fundamental operating costs, such as fuel, the company was forced to return three of its four leased aircraft, retaining only a single 120-seat Boeing. The venture ultimately resulted in an estimated US$4 million loss, and Lasmatres also blamed the situation on Ricardo Jaime's tenure.

== Destinations ==
Planned destinations included Aeroparque, Neuquén, Comodoro Rivadavia, Río Gallegos, Tucumán, Salta, Rosario, and seasonal flights to Iguazu and Bariloche. The network centered on Córdoba serves as an additional connecting hub and an additional Mendoza-Buenos Aires route.

== Fleet ==
The Silver Sky Airlines fleet included the following aircraft (at March 2008):

- 1 Boeing 737-200
