= Aero VIP =

Aero VIP may refer to the following airlines:

- Aero VIP (Argentina)
- Aero VIP (Portugal)
