= Flyest Lineas Aereas =

Argentine airline, 2017–2020

IATA	ICAO	Call sign
FQ	AEG	AIREST CARGO
- Founded: 2017
- Ceased operations: November 2020
- Fleet size: 2
- Parent company: Air Nostrum

Sol SA Lineas Aereas, operating as DBA Flyest Lineas Aereas (IATA code: FQ) was an Argentine airline company.

== History ==
The airline was established during 2017 as a subsidiary of Spanish airline Air Nostrum. In November 2020, Flyest filed for bankruptcy due to the impact of coronavirus and related restrictions on air travel in Argentina.

== Fleet ==
The airline once owned two Bombardier CRJ200.

== See also ==
- Aerolíneas Argentinas
- Austral Líneas Aéreas
- Flybondi
