= Avianca Argentina =

Argentinian domestic airline

Avian Líneas Aéreas S.A.

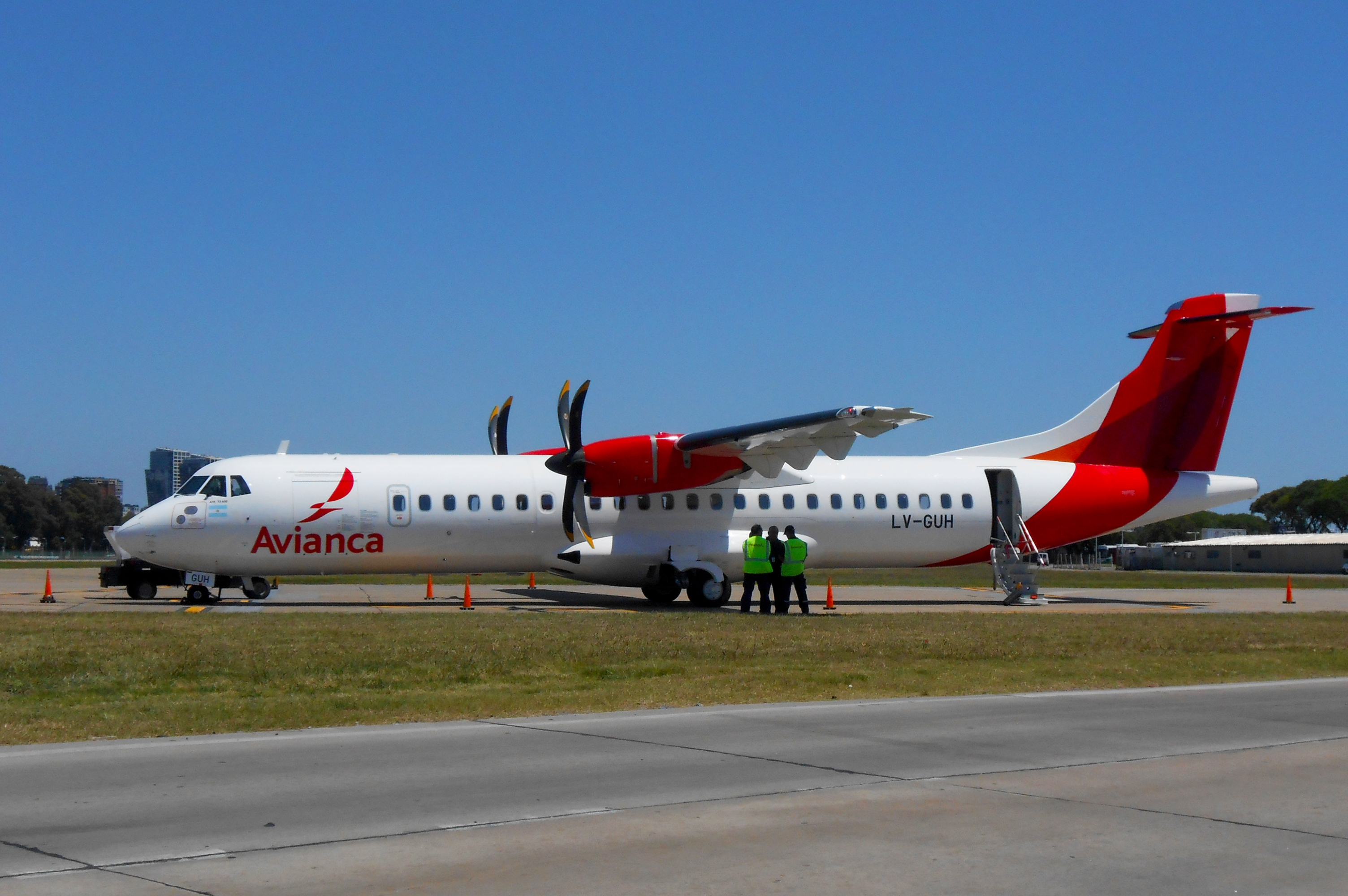
IATA	ICAO	Call sign
A0	ANC	AVIAN
- Founded: 1995 (as Macair Jet)
- Commenced operations: 21 November 2017
- Ceased operations: 7 June 2019
- Hubs: Aeroparque Jorge Newbery
- Fleet size: 2
- Destinations: 3
- Parent company: Synergy Group
- Headquarters: Buenos Aires, Argentina
- Key people: Carlos Colunga (CEO); Sergio Mastropietro
- Website: www.avianca.com.ar (defunct)

Avianca Argentina, legally incorporated as Avian Líneas Aéreas S.A., was an Argentine airline headquartered in Buenos Aires, Argentina, with its operational hub at Aeroparque Jorge Newbery in the city. The airline operated commercially under the Avianca brand through a license agreement; however, it was independent of the Avianca Holdings. The airline ceased all operations on 7 June 2019.

== History ==
The airline was founded in March 2016, after Synergy Group, the parent company of Avianca Holdings, acquired Argentina-based charter airline Macair Jet. In November 2016, Synergy Aerospace announced a firm order for the purchase of 12 ATR 72-600s for the airline to be operated under the Avianca brand. The first ATR 72 was delivered on 13 January 2017. Following the use of the two ATR 72 aircraft for charter flights from July 2017, the airline began scheduled services on 21 November 2017.

The airline originally planned to operate passenger and cargo flights both internationally and within Argentina from a primary hub at Teniente General Benjamín Matienzo International Airport serving San Miguel de Tucumán, with a fleet of Airbus A320-200 aircraft. The initial plans included the transferal of Airbus A320s from Avianca Brasil, followed by the launch of international services to São Paulo/Guarulhos International Airport on 5 February 2019. However, by January 2019, Avianca Argentina's plans for international services were canceled, with its sole Airbus A320 to be returned to Avianca Brasil (later taken up by LATAM Brasil), as the Argentine airline cited rising operating costs due to the weakening of the Argentine peso relative to the strengthening United States dollar.

By April 2019, Avianca Argentina was reported to be struggling, having cut its route network to two destinations from the five it had planned to operate from Buenos Aires, and employing as many as 80 pilots while the airline's fleet remained at two aircraft, out of the four aircraft it had originally planned to operate at the time. The airline's CEO Carlos Colunga described the conditions as "unsustainable" and attributed the operational difficulties to the strengthening US dollar and rising fuel costs. On 7 June 2019, the airline requested a 90-day suspension of operations starting from 9 June in order to restructure the company, but the airline subsequently ceased operations.

On 5 December 2025, it was reported that the company had exited bankruptcy and is looking into restarting operations.

== Destinations ==
Avianca Argentina served or previously served the following destinations by the time of the airline's closure in June 2019:

Country	City	Airport	Notes	Ref
Argentina	Buenos Aires	Aeroparque Jorge Newbery	Hub	
Argentina	Mar del Plata	Astor Piazzolla International Airport		
Argentina	Reconquista	Reconquista Airport	Terminated	
Argentina	Rosario	Rosario – Islas Malvinas International Airport	Terminated	
Argentina	Santa Fe	Sauce Viejo Airport		
Uruguay	Punta del Este	Capitán de Corbeta Carlos A. Curbelo International Airport	Terminated	

== Fleet ==
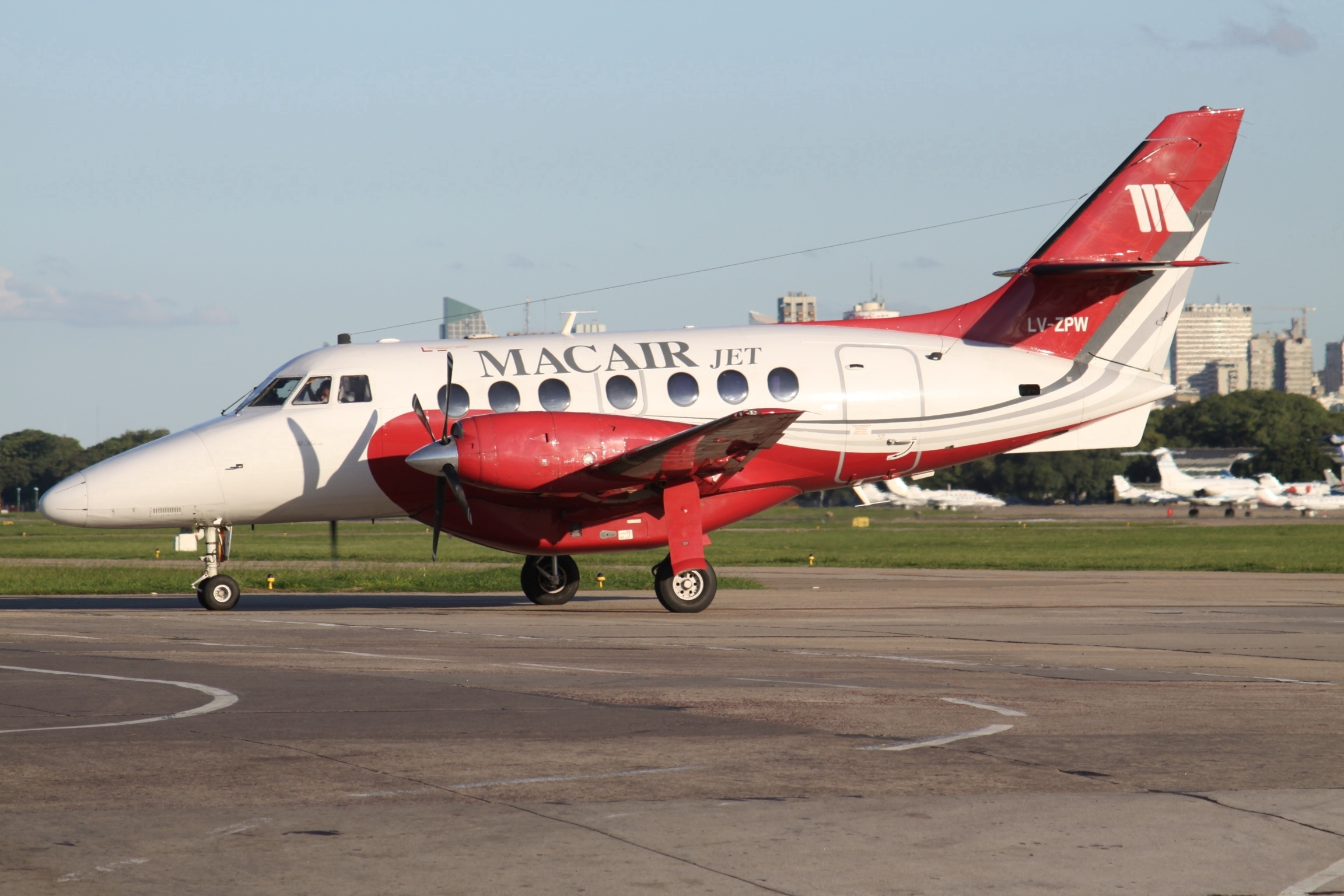
Macair Jet BAe Jetstream 32 parked at Aeroparque Jorge Newbery in 2008

Macair Jet, and later Avianca Argentina, formerly operated the following aircraft:

Aircraft	Total	Introduced	Retired	Notes
Airbus A320-200	1	2018	2018	
ATR 72-200	2	2017	2019	
BAe Jetstream 32	6	2006	2017	
Gulfstream V	1	2001	2002	
Learjet 25D	1	Unknown	Unknown	
Learjet 31A	1	2008	Unknown	
Learjet 35A	1	2008	Unknown	
Learjet 60	1	1994	2002	
McDonnell Douglas MD-87	1	2009	2012	Operated for Aerochaco

== See also ==
- List of defunct airlines of Argentina
