= LADE Flight 072 =

1995 aviation accident in Argentina

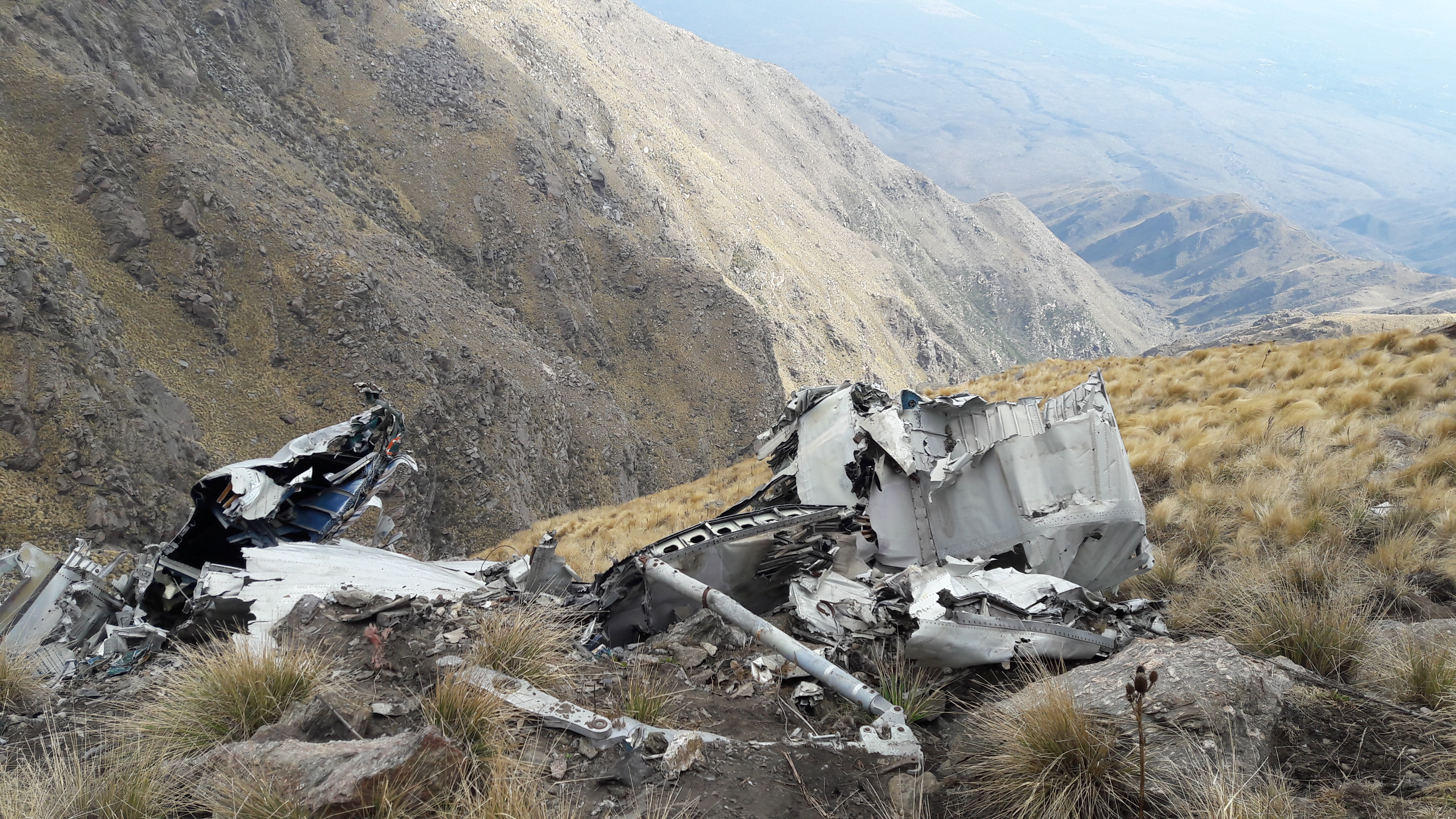
- The wreckage of the aircraft on the Cerro Los Linderos

Accident
- Date: 8 November 1995
- Summary: Controlled flight into terrain, while the aircraft was flying too low
- Site: Cerro Los Linderos, Córdoba Province, Argentina; 32°06′48″S 64°56′52″W

Aircraft
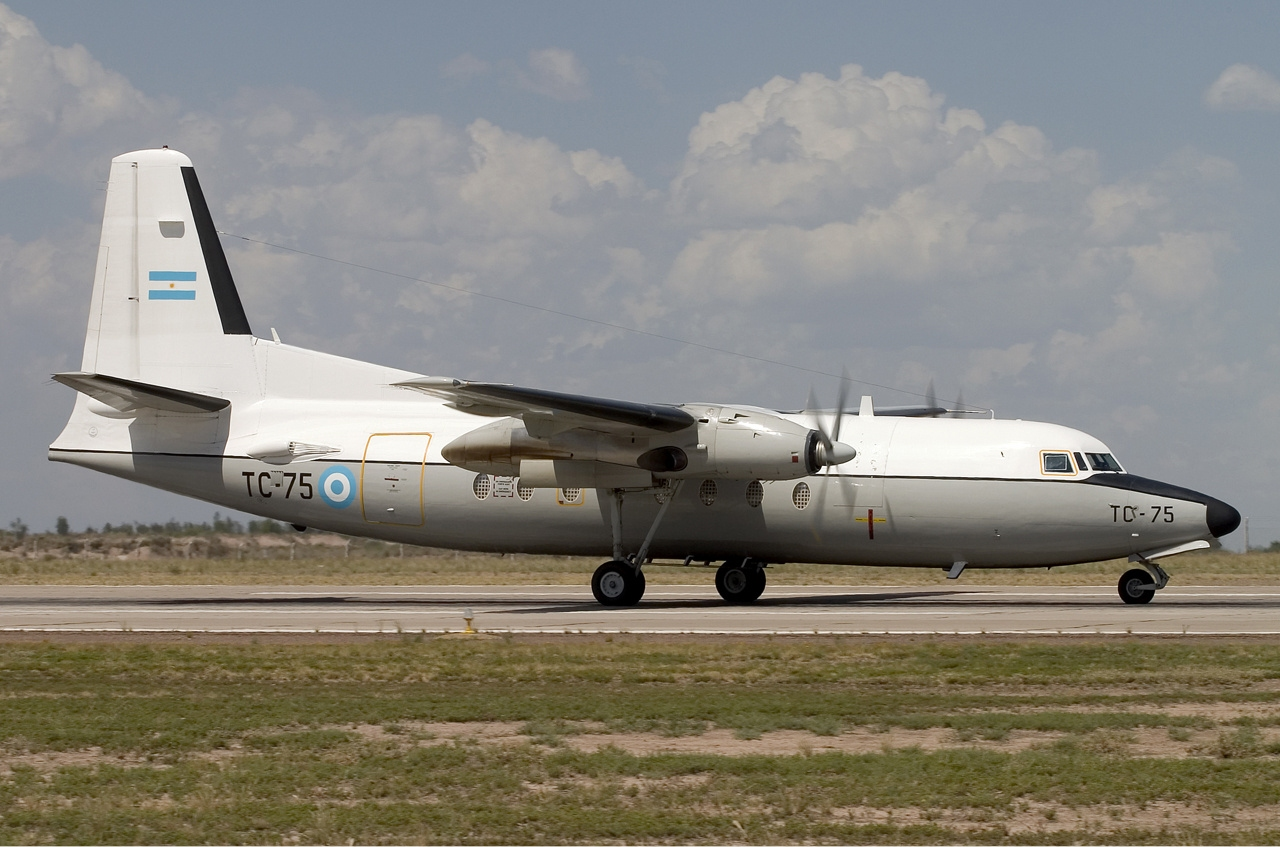
- A Fokker F-27, similar to the one involved
- Aircraft type: Fokker F27 Friendship 400M
- Operator: LADE
- IATA flight No.: 5U072
- ICAO flight No.: LDE072
- Call sign: LADE 072
- Registration: TC-72
- Flight origin: General Enrique Mosconi International Airport, Chubut Province, Argentina
- 1st stopover: Villa Reynolds Airport, San Luis Province, Argentina
- Destination: Córdoba Airport, Córdoba Province, Argentina
- Occupants: 53
- Passengers: 48
- Crew: 5
- Fatalities: 53
- Survivors: 0

On 8 November, 1995, LADE Flight 072, a Fokker F27 Friendship operating an internal Air Force connection flight in Argentina from General Enrique Mosconi International Airport which is a mixed Civilian/Air Force Base airport, Chubut Province to Córdoba Airport, Córdoba Province, with a stopover in Villa Reynolds Airport, San Luis Province, crashed into the Cerro Los Linderos mountain. All 53 people on board were killed. The crash is a case of controlled flight into terrain, caused by the fact that the aircraft was at an altitude too low for the area.

== Background ==
=== Aircraft ===
The aircraft involved in the accident was a Fokker F27 Friendship 400M, registered as TC-72 and manufactured in 1981.

=== Passengers and crew ===
The two pilots of the flight were captain Luis Ibarra and first officer Daniel Zarza, both argentinian nationals. There were also three other crew members on board, all members of the Argentine Air Force. The flight was chartered to carry soldiers and their families to a graduation ceremony at a military aviation school, due to this 13 of the passengers were children.

== Accident ==
The aircraft, on a charter flight, was to fly on the Comodoro Rivadivia-Córdoba route, with an intermediate stopover. The first leg of the flight went uneventful, then, when the aircraft was about to take off from Villa Reynolds Airport, a thunderstorm was spotted in the path that they would have followed; this caused the flight to be delayed and nearly cancelled, but the passengers insisted to continue, and so it was done. The flight path was modified to avoid the thunderstorm, the aircraft would have flown at a lower altitude and would have passed over the city Río Cuarto, just south of the storm front. The aircraft took off again and started its cruise, but, shortly after, at about 8:30 pm local time, the air traffic control centre in Córdoba lost contact with the aircraft, and at the same time residents of the area of the plane's last known position reported seeing an aircraft flying low and exploding after hitting a mountainside. Flight 072 struck the Cerro Los Linderos mountain at an altitude of about 2400 meters, killing all 53 people on board on impact.

== Search and rescue ==
Over 150 people and two helicopters took part to the search and rescue mission. Due to the difficult terrain and the adverse weather conditions the rescuers took more than eight hours to reach the crash site, and not all of the bodies of the victims could be recovered.

== Investigation ==
An investigation was made on the crash, and it found human error as the main cause of the crash. The aircraft should have not taken off due to the approaching thunderstorm front, but instead it should have waited until the weather cleared out. Also the pilots were flying too low for the new route they selected, causing the aircraft to collide with mountains.

== Aftermath ==
The recovered bodies were taken back by plane to Comodoro Rivadavia, where a ceremony and a funeral, in which more than 1000 people took part, were held; in the region also a day of public mourning was observed. A memorial, made up of a 5 meters tall cross, fragments of the wreckage and commemorative plaques, with photos and names of the victims on them, was built on the crash site, it also became a trekking destination.
