= Andes Líneas Aéreas =

Argentine airline based in Salta

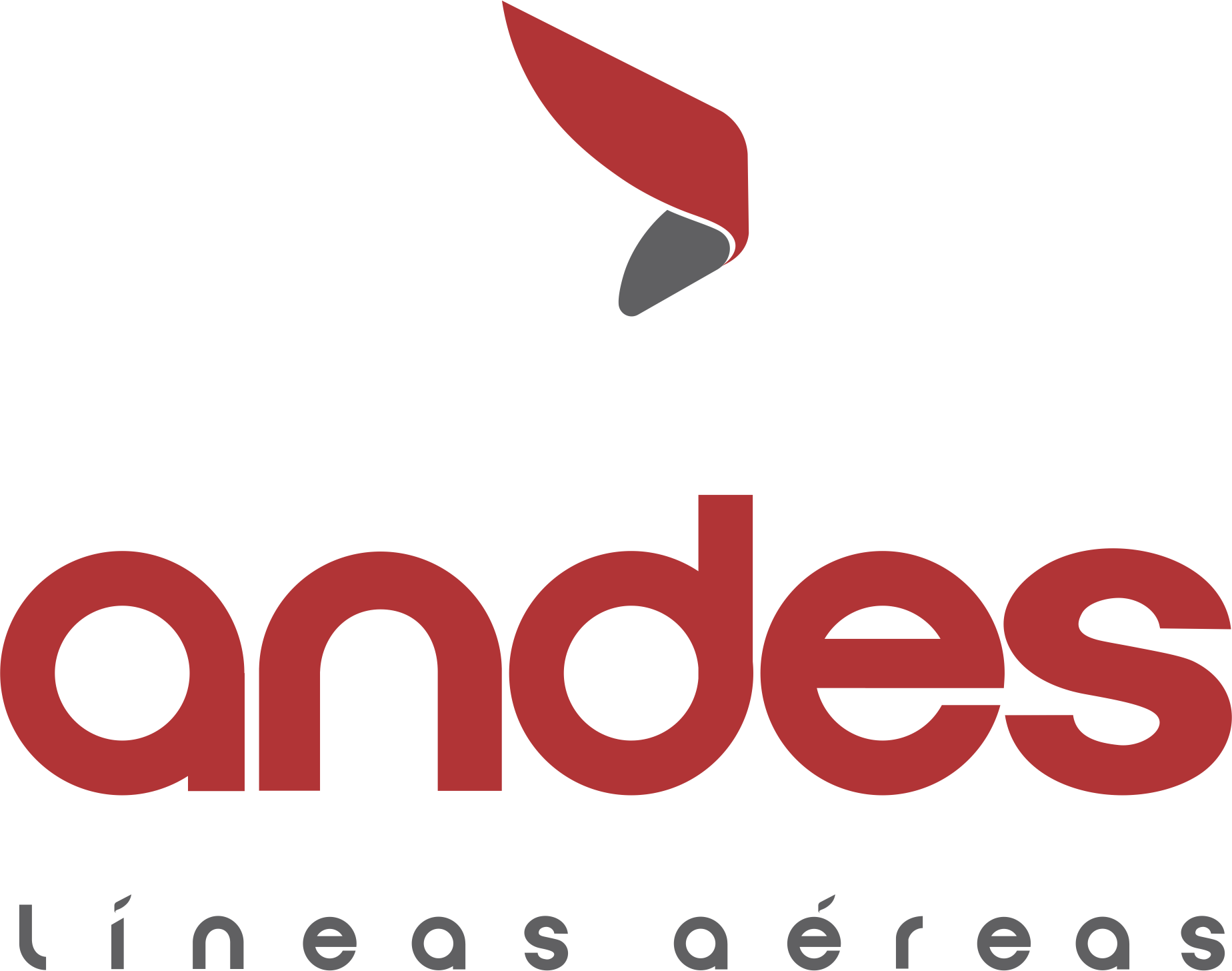
| IATA | ICAO | Call sign |
|---|---|---|
| O4 | ANS | AEROANDES |
- Founded: December 2005
- Commenced operations: 20 June 2006
- Hubs: Martín Miguel de Güemes International Airport
- Focus cities: Aeroparque Jorge Newbery
- Fleet size: 3
- Destinations: 8
- Headquarters: Salta, Argentina
- Employees: 250 (2019)
- Website: www.andesonline.com

Andes Líneas Aéreas is an Argentine airline based in Salta. It operates regional services, as well as charter flights to tourist destinations in Argentina and Brazil on behalf of local tour operators. Its main hub is at Martín Miguel de Güemes International Airport in Salta.

== History ==
Andes Líneas Aéreas began operations on 20 June 2006 with services between Salta and Buenos Aires. From its beginnings, the company has been one of the main charter flight providers in Argentina, covering local destinations as well as destinations in Brazil and in the Caribbean. It has also been the official transport of major Argentine football clubs such as River Plate, Boca Juniors, San Lorenzo, etc. After Salta, Andes added regular scheduled flights between Buenos Aires and Puerto Madryn, Jujuy and Cordoba (the latter were later discontinued).

Following the change in government, and therefore airline policy, in December 2015 in Argentina, Andes began expanding its network and fleet.

In February 2017, Andes received formal authorization from the Argentine Civil Aviation Authority (ANAC) to fly to a large number of domestic and international destinations including Rosario, Puerto Iguazu, Bariloche, Comodoro Rivadavia, Puerto Madryn, Ushuaia, El Calafate, São Paulo, Santiago de Chile and Lima among others.

In the summer of 2017, the airline inaugurated regular seasonal summer flights to Mar del Plata from Buenos Aires. It also restarted scheduled flights between Cordoba and Buenos Aires, and between Mendoza and Buenos Aires in March 2017. The company was scheduled to add flights to Termas de Rio Hondo (as a replacement for Tucuman while works continued at the airport) in May 2017, as well as flights to Iguazu (July 2017), Bariloche and Comodoro Rivadavia from Buenos Aires, and charter flights to the Dominican Republic from Córdoba, all in 2017. The company also received its first Boeing 737-800 formerly owned by Malaysia Airlines in May 2017.

On 9 November 2019, the airline resumed all flights after the Chubut provincial government approved the payment of ARS199 million pesos (US$3.34 million) that was owed to the airline. However, it suspended operations again in 2020, following the COVID-19 pandemic.

In May 2026, the airline had completed a formal business reorganisation, and has transitioned back to stabilised operations following the suspension. The airline has signed a wet-lease agreement with Flybondi, where Boeing 737-800 aircraft were leased to the airline.

== Destinations ==
As of March 2023, the airline flies to the following destinations:

| City | Airport | Notes |
|---|---|---|
| Bariloche | San Carlos de Bariloche Airport | |
| Buenos Aires | Aeroparque Jorge Newbery | Focus city |
| Comodoro Rivadavia | General Enrique Mosconi International Airport | |
| Mendoza | Governor Francisco Gabrielli International Airport | |
| Puerto Iguazú | Cataratas del Iguazú International Airport | |
| Puerto Madryn | El Tehuelche Airport | |
| Salta | Martín Miguel de Güemes International Airport | Hub |
| San Salvador de Jujuy | Gobernador Horacio Guzmán International Airport | |

=== Terminated international destinations ===
- Cabo Frio
- Florianopolis
- Maceió
- Porto Seguro
- Salvador de Bahia
- Santiago
- Varadero
- Samaná
- Punta del Este
- Porlamar

== Fleet ==
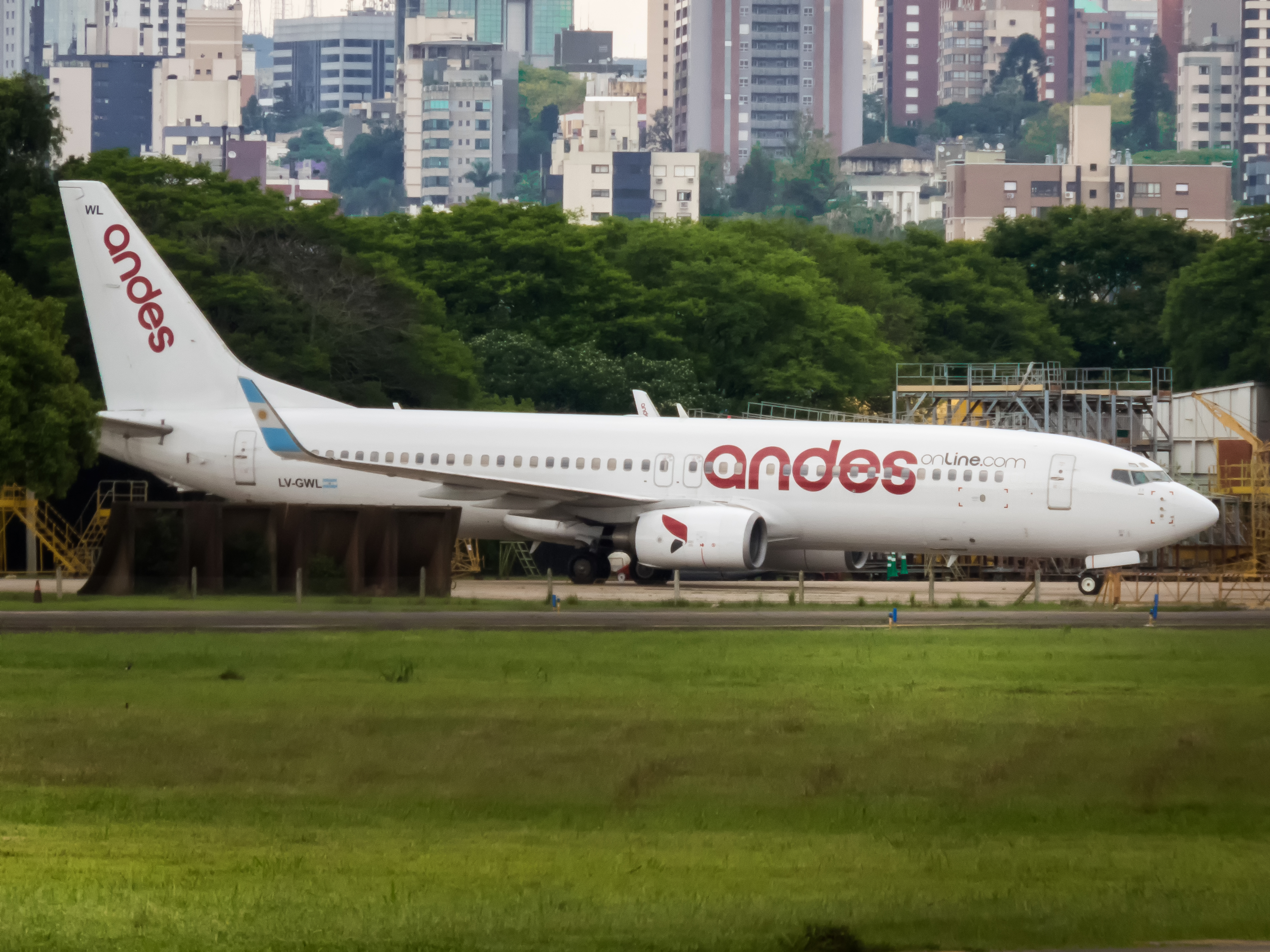
Andes Boeing 737-800

=== Current ===
As of August 2025, Andes Líneas Aéreas operates the following aircraft:

Andes Líneas Aéreas fleet
| Aircraft | In service | Orders | Passengers | Notes |
|---|---|---|---|---|
| Boeing 737-800 | 2 | 1 | 189 | |
| Boeing 737-700 | 1 | 1 | TBD | |
| Total | 3 | 1 | | |

== See also ==
- List of airlines of Argentina
