= Flybondi =

Argentine low-cost airline

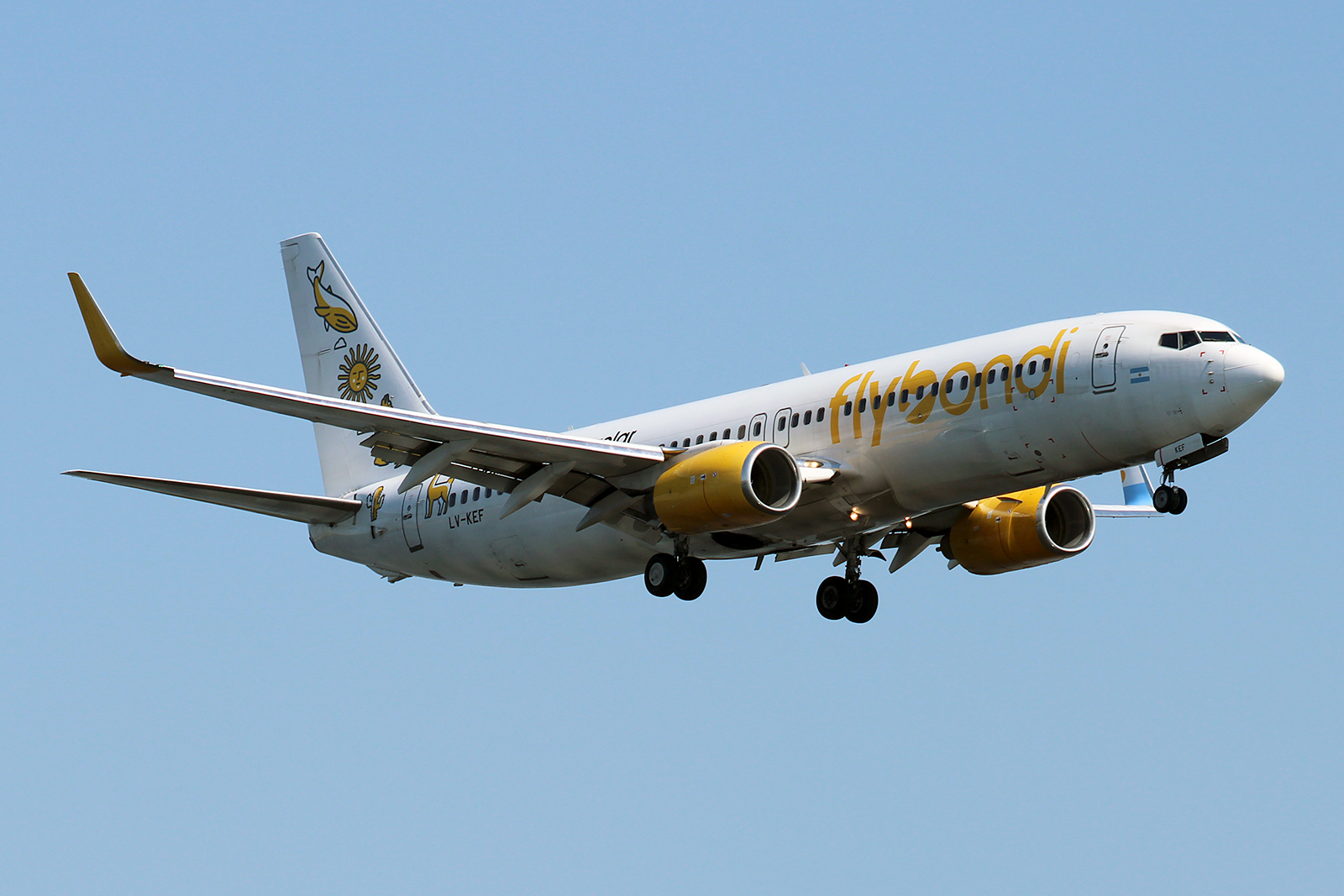
- A flybondi Boeing 737-800
IATA	ICAO	Call sign
FO	FBZ	BONDI
- Founded: September 2016; 10 years ago
- Commenced operations: January 26, 2018; 8 years ago
- Ceased operations: August 6, 2026; 2 months ago
- Operating bases: Buenos Aires–Aeroparque
- Focus cities: Córdoba
- Fleet size: 15
- Destinations: 23 (as of December 2024)
- Headquarters: Buenos Aires, Argentina
- Key people: Mauricio Sana (CEO)
- Website: http://flybondi.com

FB Líneas Aéreas S.A., operating as Flybondi, was an ultra low-cost airline in Argentina. It was the first of its kind in the country, operated Boeing 737-800 aircraft from its bases in Buenos Aires and Córdoba. The company slogan was La libertad de volar ("The freedom of flying" in Spanish).

In 2024, Flybondi received much criticism domestically and abroad for its tendency to have frequent cancellations and large or unannounced delays, and it was ranked as the 3rd worst airline by FlightAware.

On 6 August 2026, Flybondi suspended all flight operations amidst a severe financial, operational, and labor crisis, marked by grounded aircraft and frozen bank accounts. On 2 October 2026, the company filed for creditor protection to restructure estimated liabilities of around $120 million. Media reports and court filings indicated that the airline's remaining operations and assets could be transferred or rebranded under a new entity named OCA Air.

== History ==
=== Background ===
Speculation about the creation of a new airline began in the first half of 2016, shortly after the inauguration of President Mauricio Macri, who promised to open up Argentina's skies with the implementation of more modern laws and the reduction of bureaucracy to facilitate the creation of new airlines, since until then, the South American country was one of the most bureaucratic and restrictive in the world in terms of air transport policy. In this context, speculation indicated that the Irish ultra low-cost carrier Ryanair was working to create a subsidiary in Argentina through Declan Ryan and the Irelandia Aviation group, which was behind the creation of two other low-cost airlines in Latin America, VivaAerobus in Mexico and Viva Air in Colombia.

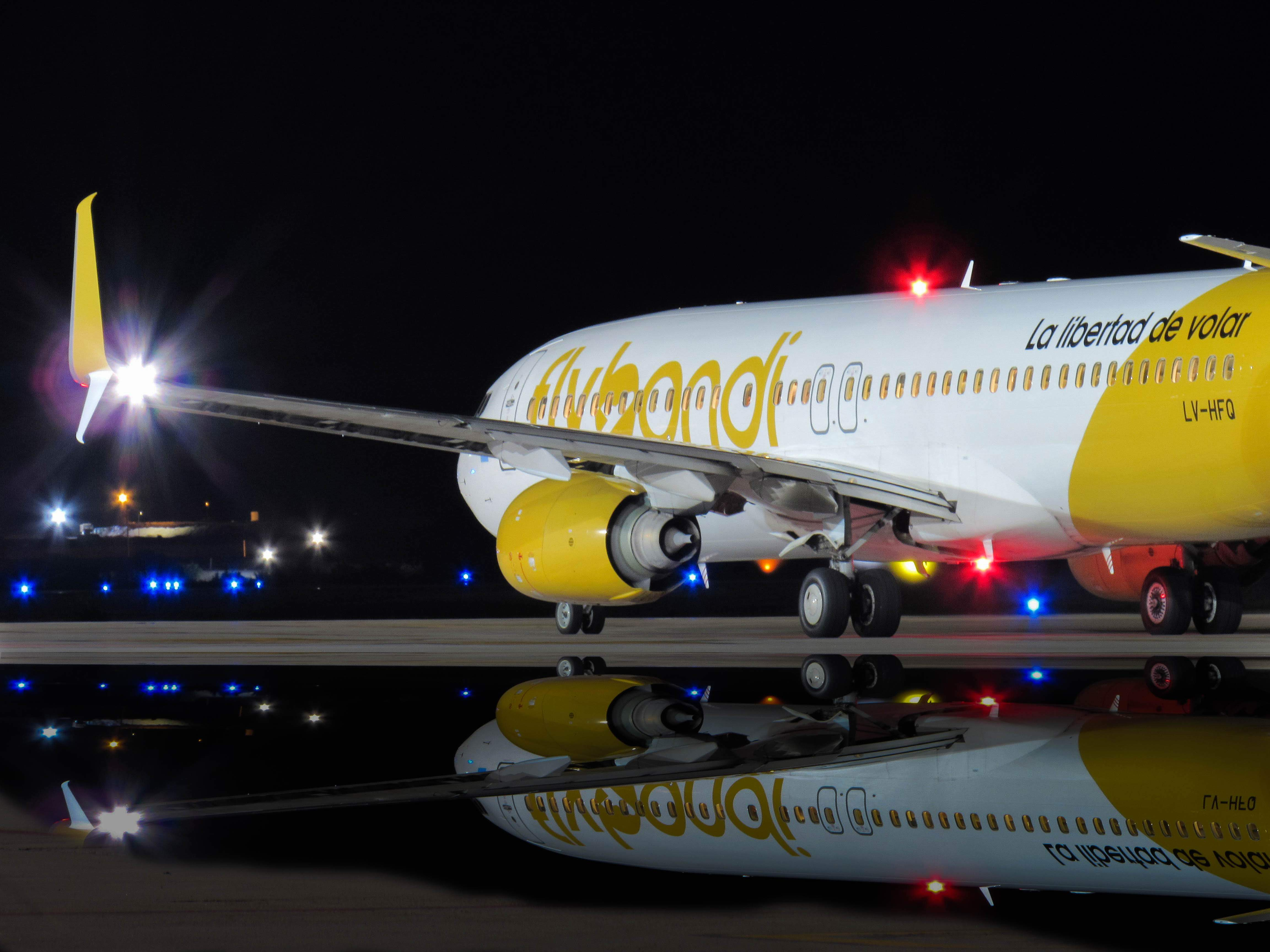
Boeing 737-800 reg. LV-HFQ in former livery taxiing at Governor Francisco Gabrielli International Airport

In June 2016, the Argentine newspaper La Nación, citing sources close to Irelandia Aviation, mentioned the possibility of acquiring the airline Andes Líneas Aéreas to transform it into the ultra-low-cost airline planned by the group, just as the Brazilian group Synergy Aerospace, controlling shareholder of Avianca Holdings and owner of Avianca Brasil (Oceanair), did with Macair Jet, which became Avianca Argentina.

=== Establishment ===
The creation of Flybondi, Argentina's first ultra-low-cost airline (ULCC), was announced in September 2016 by a group of Argentine businessmen, supported by funds from big names in the aviation industry, such as Michael Cawley, member of the board of Ryanair, Montie Brewer, former CEO of Air Canada and Robert Wright, founder of British Airways Citiflyer Express and shareholder and former non-executive director at Wizz Air, as well as Argentine Gastón Parisier and Swiss Julian Cook, founder and former CEO of Switzerland's FlyBaboo. Together, the investors would have contributed US$ 75 million with the aim of starting operations in 2017.

Bondi is the informal name given in to urban public transport buses in Argentina. As an ultra-low-cost airline, the company's intention was to make it as popular and accessible as a bus. Therefore, Flybondi literally means flying bus. The initial idea was to call it Air Bondi, but on the recommendation of an advertising agency, due to the risk of conflict with the name of the European aircraft manufacturer Airbus, it was decided to use the prefix fly instead of air.

In October 2016, the airline revealed its initial plans, intending to fly to Comodoro Rivadavia, Córdoba, El Calafate, Mendoza, Neuquén, Resistencia, Puerto Iguazú, Río Gallegos, Salta, San Carlos de Bariloche, Tucumán and Ushuaia with a fleet of six aircraft. And although it was considering both Airbus and Boeing narrow-body models, according to co-founder Julian Cook, Flybondi's preference would be the Boeing 737-800.

On December 5, 2016, during the first public hearing held in 11 years by the Argentine Ministry of Economy for airlines to request new routes, Flybondi defined as its main base of operations El Palomar Airport, located 18 kilometers from Buenos Aires, requesting to fly to and from the aerodrome that, until then, served as an air base for the Argentine Air Force.

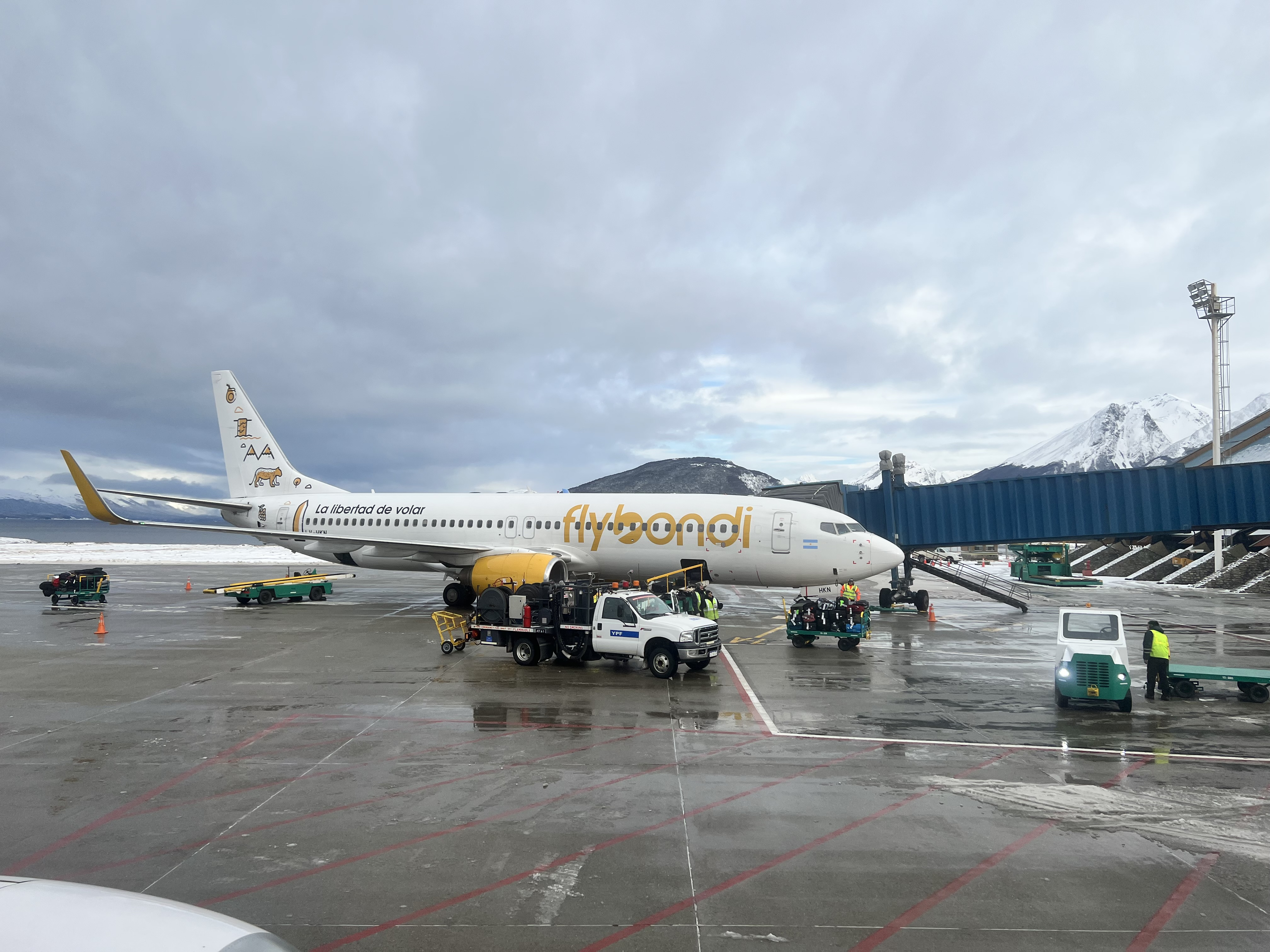
Boeing 737-800 reg. LV-HKN in current livery in Ushuaia

On March 16, 2017, Flybondi co-founder and CEO Julian Cook officially announced the choice of the Boeing 737 for the airline's fleet, announcing that they would be configured with 189 seats in a single-class layout. And in May of the same year, he announced the signing of the lease agreement with SMBC Aviation Capital for his first aircraft, with plans to lease nine more later that year.

Flybondi's first aircraft, the Boeing 737-800 registration LV-HKS (MSN 33821) named Nelson, was officially delivered on December 2.

=== Operations ===
The airline's inaugural flight from Ingeniero Aeronáutico Ambrosio L.V. Taravella International Airport in Córdoba to Cataratas del Iguazú International Airport in Puerto Iguazu took place on 26 January 2018.

The first routes were launched from its base at Córdoba International Airport in January 2018, to the cities of Mendoza, Bariloche and Puerto Iguazú. In February 2018, the airline was the first civilian airline to operate from El Palomar Airport near Buenos Aires, where it established a new base and began flights to Salta, Neuquén, and Tucumán.

Flybondi went international on December 17, 2018, with flights between El Palomar in the Greater Buenos Aires area and the Paraguayan capital Asunción.

In July 2019, the airline announced that it would start flights between Buenos Aires and Rio de Janeiro. The flights started operating on 11 October 2019, departing from the airline's main base at Buenos Aires' El Palomar Airport to Galeão Airport in Rio de Janeiro.

On December 5, 2024, Flybondi received an ultimatum from the National Civil Aviation Administration of Argentina to present a plan to reduce cancellations after 70 flights were canceled that past weekend, leaving over 12,000 stranded, compounded with years of frequent cancellations. This came across much larger criticisms for Flybondi's tendency for large, unannounced delays, being ranked the 3rd worst in the world for delays by FlightAware.

== Destinations ==
As of September 2025, Flybondi operated to the following destinations:

Base
Future
Terminated

Country	City	Airport	Notes	Refs
Argentina	Bahía Blanca	Comandante Espora Airport	Terminated	
Argentina	Buenos Aires	Aeroparque Jorge Newbery	Base	
Argentina	Buenos Aires	El Palomar Airport	Terminated	
Argentina	Buenos Aires	Ministro Pistarini International Airport	Base	
Argentina	Comodoro Rivadavia	General Enrique Mosconi International Airport		
Argentina	Córdoba	Ingeniero Aeronáutico Ambrosio L.V. Taravella International Airport		
Argentina	Corrientes	Doctor Fernando Piragine Niveyro International Airport		
Argentina	El Calafate	Comandante Armando Tola International Airport		
Argentina	Mar del Plata	Ástor Piazzolla International Airport		
Argentina	Mendoza	Governor Francisco Gabrielli International Airport		
Argentina	Neuquén	Presidente Perón International Airport		
Argentina	Posadas	Libertador General José de San Martín Airport		
Argentina	Puerto Iguazú	Cataratas del Iguazú International Airport		
Argentina	Puerto Madryn	El Tehuelche Airport		
Argentina	Rosario	Rosario – Islas Malvinas International Airport	Terminated	
Argentina	Salta	Martín Miguel de Güemes International Airport		
Argentina	San Carlos de Bariloche	San Carlos de Bariloche Airport		
Argentina	San Juan	Domingo Faustino Sarmiento Airport		
Argentina	San Miguel de Tucumán	Teniente General Benjamín Matienzo International Airport		
Argentina	San Salvador de Jujuy	Gobernador Horacio Guzmán International Airport		
Argentina	Santiago del Estero	Vicecomodoro Ángel de la Paz Aragonés Airport		
Argentina	Trelew	Almirante Marcos A. Zar Airport		
Argentina	Ushuaia	Ushuaia – Malvinas Argentinas International Airport		
Brazil	Florianópolis	Hercílio Luz International Airport		
Brazil	Rio de Janeiro	Rio de Janeiro/Galeão International Airport		
Brazil	São Paulo	São Paulo/Guarulhos International Airport	Terminated	
Peru	Lima	Jorge Chavez International Airport		
Paraguay	Asunción	Silvio Pettirossi International Airport		
Paraguay	Encarnacion	Teniente Amin Ayub Gonzalez Airport	Terminated	
Uruguay	Punta del Este	Capitán de Corbeta Carlos A. Curbelo International Airport	Terminated	

== Fleet ==
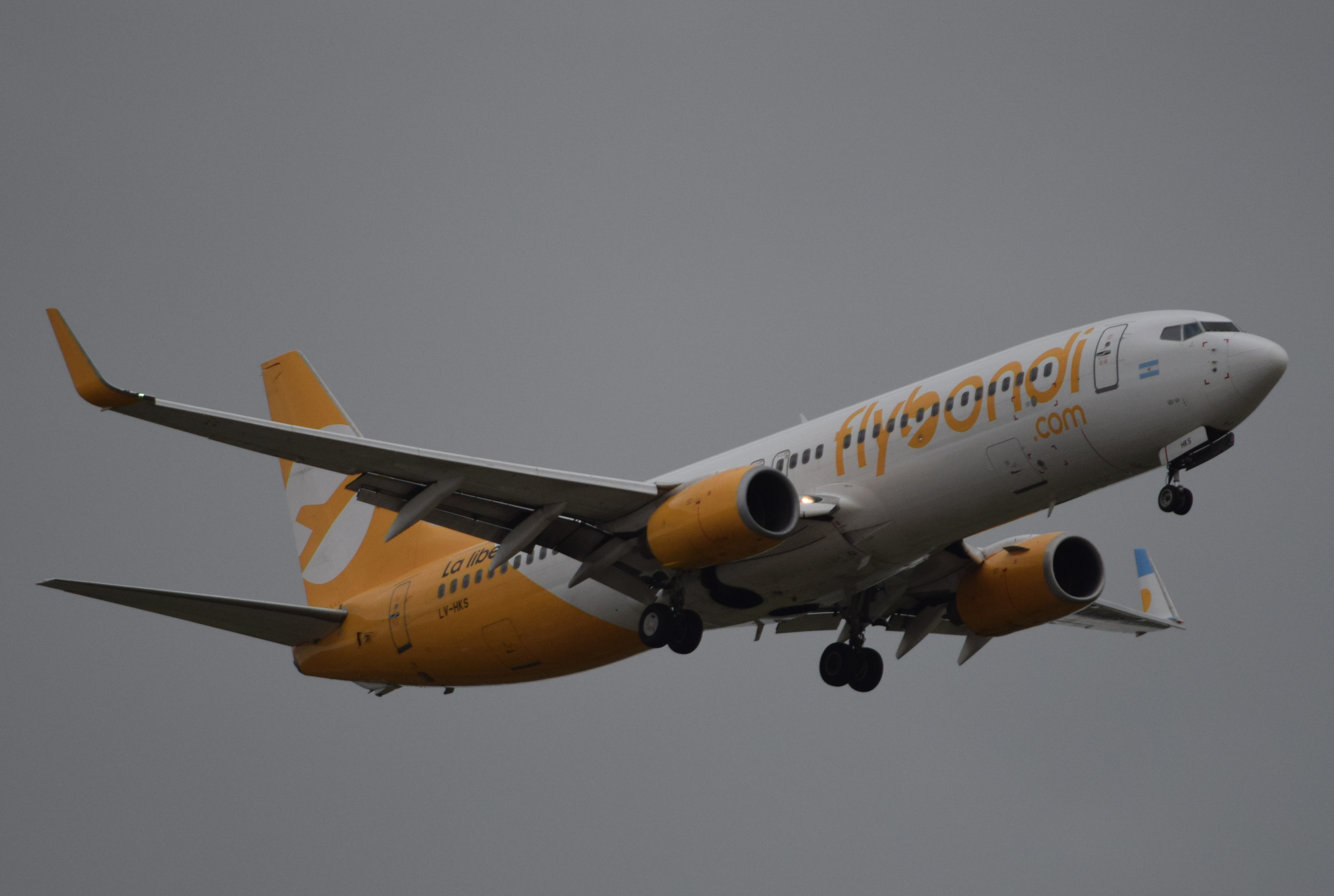
Boeing 737-800

As of August 2025, Flybondi operated the following aircraft:

Flybondi fleet
Aircraft	In service	Orders	Passengers	Note
Airbus A220-300	—	15	TBA	Options for 5 additional aircraft. Deliveries begin 2027.Unconfirmed by an Airbus Press Release.
Boeing 737-800	15	—	189	
Boeing 737 MAX 10	—	10	TBA	Options for 5 additional aircraft. Deliveries begin 2027.
Total	15	25		
