= Aero VIP (Argentina) =

Argentine airline, 1999–2010

Aerovip
IATA	ICAO	Call sign
2D	AOG	AVIP
- Founded: 1999
- Ceased operations: 2010
- Hubs: Ezeiza International Airport
- Fleet size: 1
- Headquarters: Buenos Aires, Argentina

Aerovip was an airline based in Buenos Aires, Argentina (not to be confused with Aero VIP of Uruguay). It operated regional passenger services. Its main base was Ezeiza International Airport, Buenos Aires.

Operations were suspended in November 2004, with the airline in debt, but restarted operations in 2009. However, the airline ceased operations again in November 2010.

== History ==
The airline was established on 15 March 1999 and started operations on 23 June 1999. It operated for a time as LAPA VIP and as ARG Express until sold back to its original owner. The airline was owned by Sebastian Agote. Operations were suspended in November 2004.

Teba, which held the concession for the Buenos Aires bus station, acquired a controlling stake in Aerovip in December 2004, buying shares representing 80% of the outstanding equity that belonged to Sebastian Agote. The other 20% will remain in hands of Eduardo Eurnekian, head of airport concessionaire Aeropuertos Argentina 2000. Aerovip has not been flying since October 3, 2004 and has debts of over US$9 million. In a meeting with the Aeronautic Union (APA), the new owners committed to resume flights by December 20, 2004, and maintain the current payroll.

In 2005 it was announced that LAN Airlines would absorb LAFSA and Aero VIP into LAN Argentina. Pilots, stewards and maintenance personnel of LAN Argentina went on strike in November 2005 to protest at management's failure to hire 150 former workers of Aero VIP.

In 2009 the Leadgate group, owner 75% of the shares of the Uruguayan airline Pluna, buys Aerovip. The Argentine airline will restart operations in 2010 a former Pluna Bombardier CRJ-900. In November of the same year, Aerovip was absorbed by PLUNA.

== Destinations ==
Aerovip operated the following services (at January 2005):

- Domestic scheduled destinations: Buenos Aires, Mar del Plata and Villa Gesell.
- International scheduled destinations: Montevideo and Punta del Este.

== Fleet ==
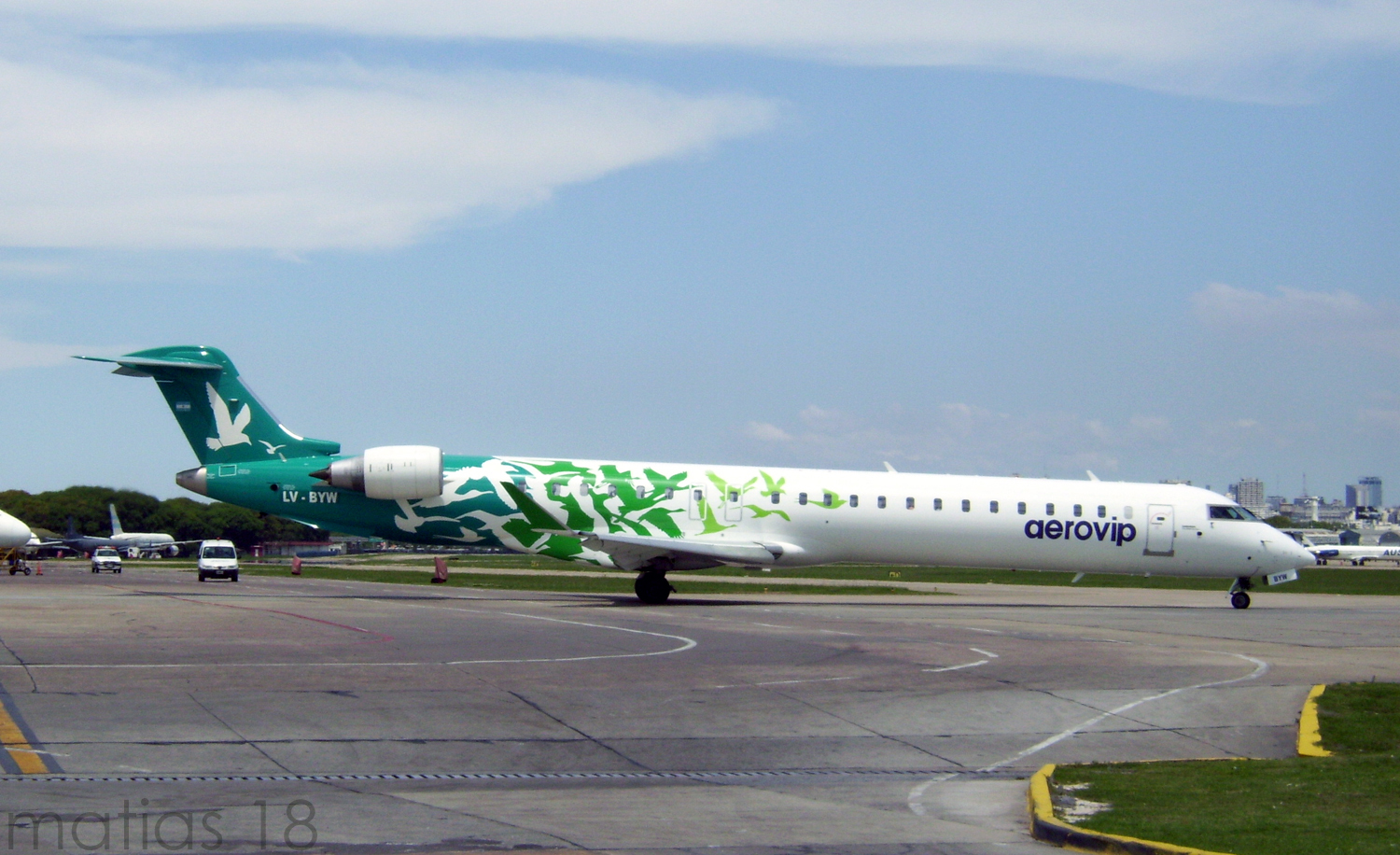
Aerovip's Bombardier CRJ-900 NextGen LV-BYW, Aeroparque Jorge Newbery, 2009

The Aerovip fleet included the following aircraft (as of 18 February 2010) :

- 1 Bombardier CRJ-900ER

The aircraft was delivered in 2009, but deposed in 2010

=== Previously operated ===
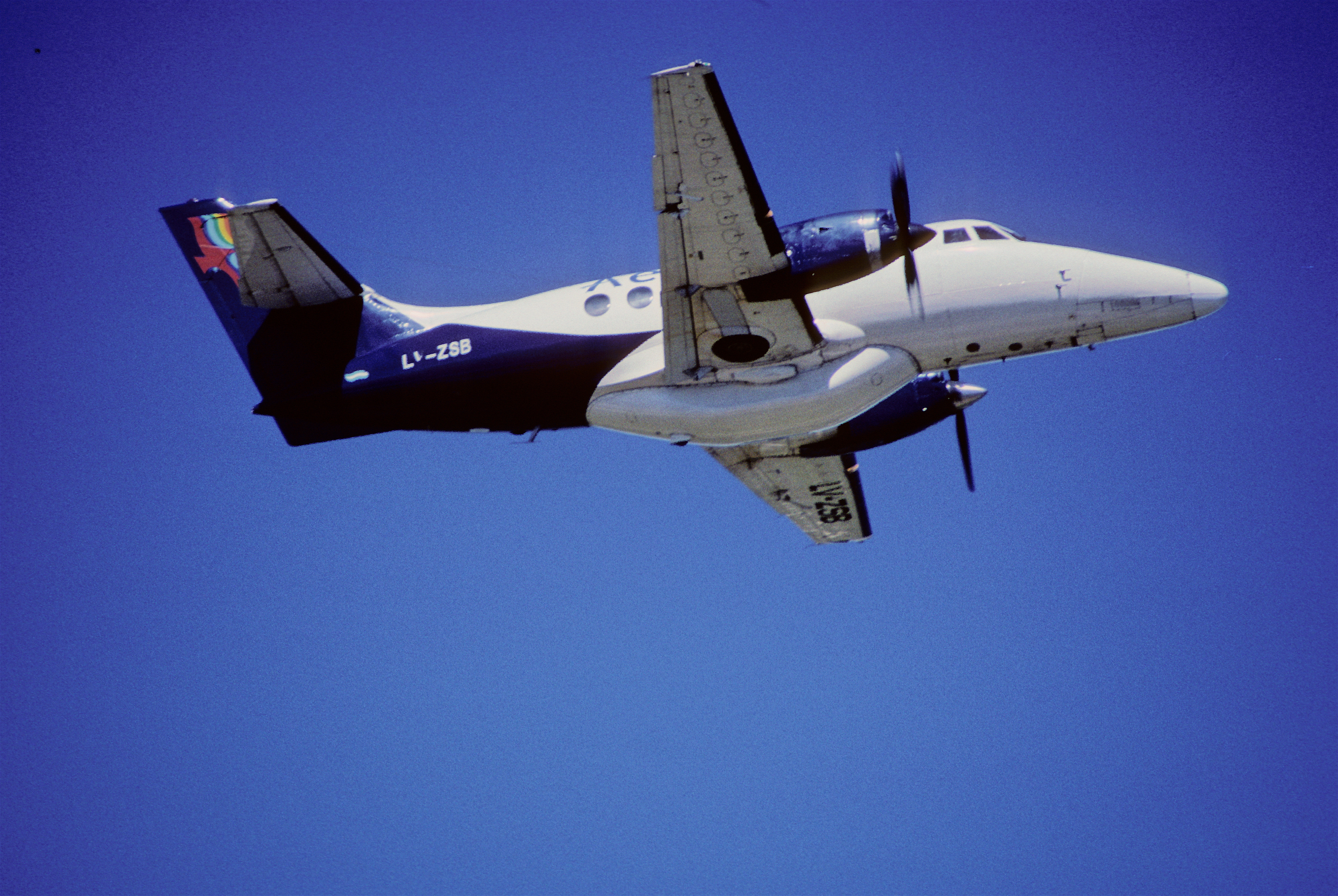
One of Aerovip's BAe Jetstream

- 1 Fairchild Metro III
- 6 BAe Jetstream 32EP

== See also ==
- List of defunct airlines of South America
