= Aerochaco =

Argentinian airline

IATA	ICAO	Call sign
VM	PRV	Aerochaco
- Founded: 2008
- Ceased operations: May 2013
- Hubs: Resistencia International Airport
- Secondary hubs: Ingeniero Ambrosio L.V. Taravella International Airport
- Alliance: Aerolíneas Argentinas/Austral Líneas Aéreas
- Fleet size: 4
- Destinations: 6
- Headquarters: Resistencia, Argentina
- Website: http://www.aerochaco.com.ar/

Aerochaco was an Argentine regional airline established as a mixed-economy enterprise jointly operated by the Chaco provincial government and the Chaco Aero Club. Formally founded in 1957 in response to poor regional road infrastructure and high aviation demand, the airline was created to improve connectivity between Chaco and other northern provinces. Aerochaco officially commenced flight operations in September 1959, initially utilizing de Havilland DHC-2 Beaver aircraft .

== History ==
In October 1956, the board of the Chaco Aero Club formed a committee to establish a regional airline. Proposed by club president Ambrosio Pujal, the initiative aimed to improve connectivity between Chaco and other northern Argentine provinces. Driven by poor road infrastructure and high aviation demand during the 1940s and 1950s, the project required significant capital, prompting the club to seek support from the provincial government.

On September 9, 1957, the Governor of Chaco Province, Pedro Avalia, signed a decree formally establishing Aerochaco as a mixed-economy enterprise jointly operated by the provincial government and the Chaco Aero Club. Subsequently, on November 25, 1957, the governor approved the company's statutes and appointed its inaugural board of directors, with Pablo Fraschina serving as its first president.

However, the airline finally operated its first flight during Anselmo Zoilo Duca's term on September 28, 1959. The airline's first flight operated between Resistencia and Sáenz Peña in a de Havilland DHC-2 Beaver piloted by Atilio Pisarello. The manifest included passengers Ambrosio Pujal, Marcelo Lemer, Eduardo Gnus, and José Rancer, officially launching an initial schedule that also serviced Formosa and Clorinda. Pisarello was also accompanied by Ernesto Pinciroli. The airline had two de Havilland DHC-2 Beavers as its first aircraft, named Toba and Mataco.

== Destinations ==
Aerochaco operated the following service:

- Argentina
  - Córdoba – Ingeniero Ambrosio L.V. Taravella International Airport
  - San Juan – Domingo Faustino Sarmiento Airport
  - Sunchales – Sunchales Airport
  - Villa María – Presidente Nestor Kirchner Airport

== Fleet ==
The Aerochaco fleet included the following aircraft:

Aerochaco Fleet
Aircraft	Total	Orders	Passengers			Notes
Aircraft	Total	Orders	C	Y	Total	Notes
BAe Jetstream 32	1	—	0	18	18	
Total	1	0				
