= American Falcon =

Argentine airline, 1995–2004

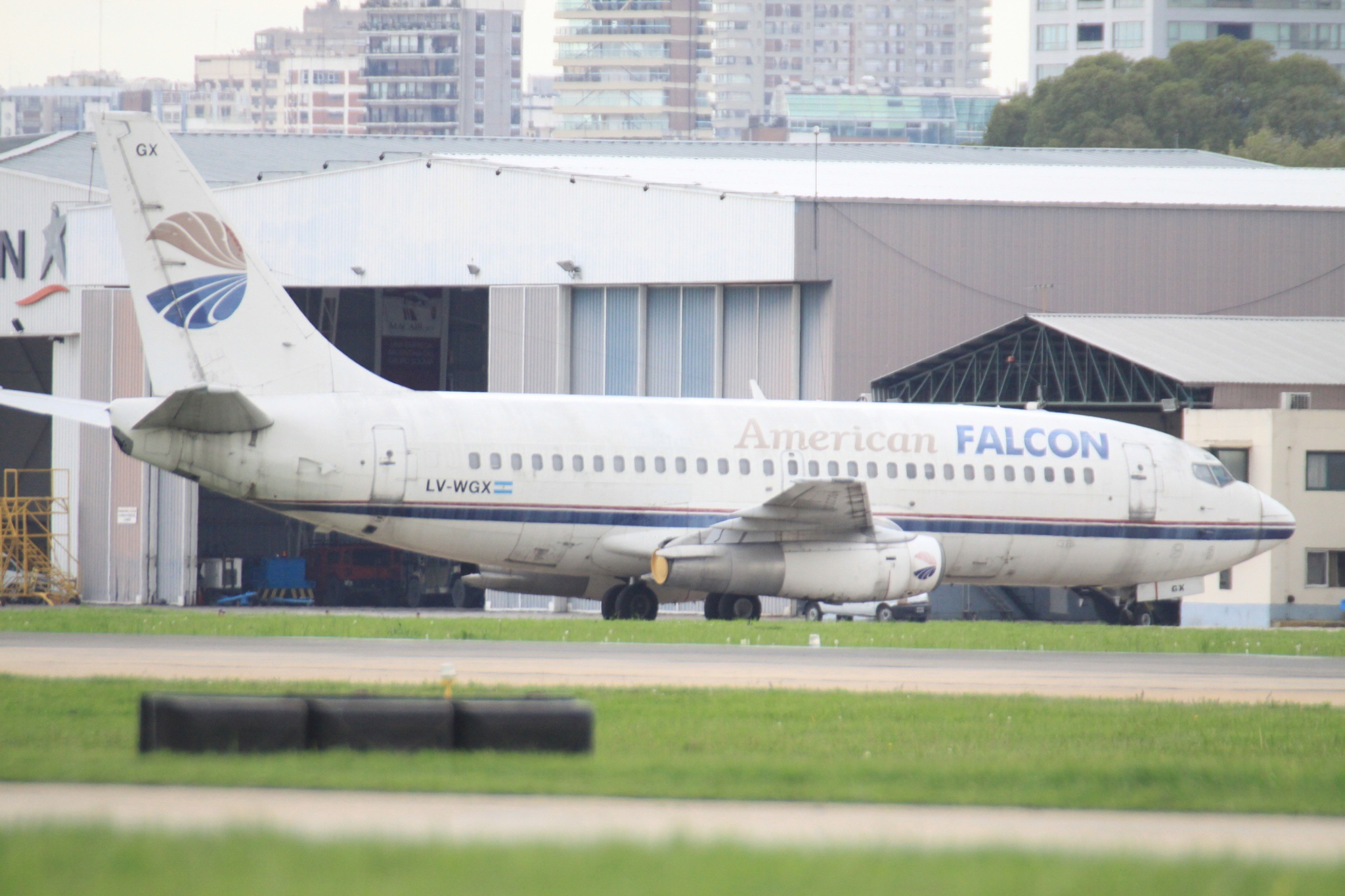
IATA	ICAO	Call sign
WK	AFB	AMERICAN FALCON
- Founded: 1995
- Ceased operations: March 2004
- Hubs: Aeroparque Jorge Newbery
- Subsidiaries: Dinar Líneas Aéreas
- Fleet size: 5
- Headquarters: Buenos Aires, Argentina
- Key people: Jorge Bunetich (CEO)
- Employees: 180
- Website: americanfalcon.com.ar

American Falcon was an Argentine airline that operated largely domestic services, but also some international routes in South America.

== History ==
The airline was formed in 1995 and initially offered only charter services on behalf of LADE, though it gradually introduced scheduled flights.

By August 2002, American Falcon had fully acquired Dinar Líneas Aéreas, absorbing US$30 million in debt. In 2003, the airline embarked on a major expansion after the closure of Dinar and Líneas Aéreas Privadas Argentinas, investing US$4 million in new routes and aircraft.

On March 1, 2004, the airline announced it was ending all scheduled operations within a week due to rising fuel costs.

== Fleet ==
The airline operated three Boeing 737-200s and two Fokker F28s, the latter of which were returned to the lessor shortly before it ended operations.

== See also ==
- List of defunct airlines of Argentina
