= Gato Dumas =

Argentine chef (1938–2004)

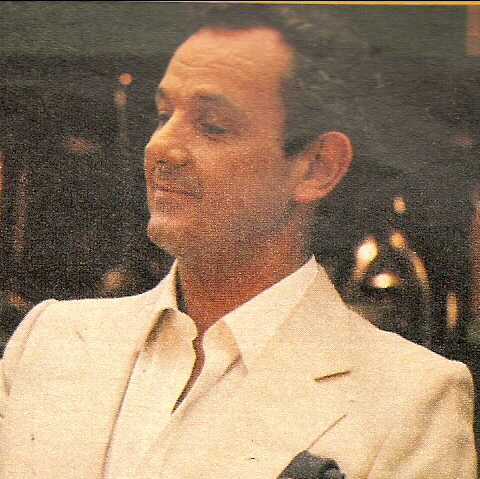
Dumas in 1983

Carlos Alberto Dumas, better known as Gato Dumas (July 20, 1938 – May 14, 2004), was an Argentine chef and restaurateur. He is considered by many the greatest chef in Argentina. He is also the founder of the largest culinary school in Latin America, the Gato Dumas Institute (Instituto Gato Dumas), with branches in Argentina (Buenos Aires and Rosario), Uruguay (Montevideo) and Colombia (Bogotá and Barranquilla).

== Life and work ==
Carlos Alberto Dumas was born in Buenos Aires, Argentina in 1938. An only child, he was given his first lessons in cuisine at age three by his grandfather, sculptor and cooking aficionado Alberto Lagos.

Studying architecture in school, he abandoned his studies in 1959 for a chance to pursue his culinary interests in London, where he was brought on by the "creator of the modern British cuisine," Chef Robert Carrier, as a dishwasher and potato peeler at "The Angel," Carrier's flagship Islington restaurant. Carrier eventually granted the young man an apprenticeship and, returning to Argentina in March 1963, Dumas opened his first establishment, "La Chimère," in 1965.

Located in Buenos Aires' upscale Recoleta district, La Chimère's success allowed Dumas to open a succession of other restaurants over the next decade: "La Termita," "Hereford," "La Jamonería de Vieytes," "The Drugstore," "Clark's," "La Terraza del Gato Dumas," "La Rotisería de Pilar," "Carpaccio" and one installed in an imported steamboat, "El Delta Queen." Dumas was called on to cater prestigious cultural events in Argentina during the 1960s, notably those hosted by the Torcuato di Tella Institute, a leading promoter of the arts. His restaurants began to advertise the "Executive Lunch Menu" in 1969, an approach based on dining à la carte, with an abbreviated and varying selection. Increasingly in demand outside Argentina, Dumas opened two restaurants in Brazil: "Clark's São Paulo" in 1973 and "La Posada La Chimère" in the seaside resort of Búzios in 1975. This latter restaurant proved specially popular with Argentine tourists in the area.

Expanding his portfolio of restaurants despite a regional economic crisis, Dumas opened "Gato Dumas," "La Bianca" and "El Nuevo Gato" in Buenos Aires in 1982. His fame earned him a number of television contracts beginning in 1983, and his cooking shows appeared on ratings leaders Channel 9 and Channel 13, among others. His frequent newspaper and magazine contributions were complemented by five cookbooks and his renown during the 1980s earned him commissions as head chef for events hosted by international figures such as David Rockefeller and Mikhail Gorbachev.

Having earned numerous culinary and broadcasting honors, he received the crowning Bocuse d'Or in Lyon, France, in 1993. Dumas opened what would be his last restaurant, "Gato Dumas Cocinero," in 1992 and in 1998, he established a cooking school in Buenos Aires. Operated jointly with two former students, Guillermo Calabrese and Martiniano Molina, the three also started a catering company and, in 2003, a gourmet frozen food line ("Gato Dumas Premium"). He became a regular contributor to Elgourmet.com, the first Argentine cable and internet culinary channel (launched in 2000).

== Illness and death ==
Dumas was hospitalized for a lung ailment and the renowned chef died in a Pilar clinic on May 14, leaving his widow, Mariana Gassó de Dumas, and five sons and daughters (four from a prior marriage). That August, Mis Historias y Mis Recetas (My Stories and Recipes) was published posthumously.
