= Reconquista Airport =

Airport in Argentina

Reconquista Airport Aeropuerto Teniente Daniel Jukic
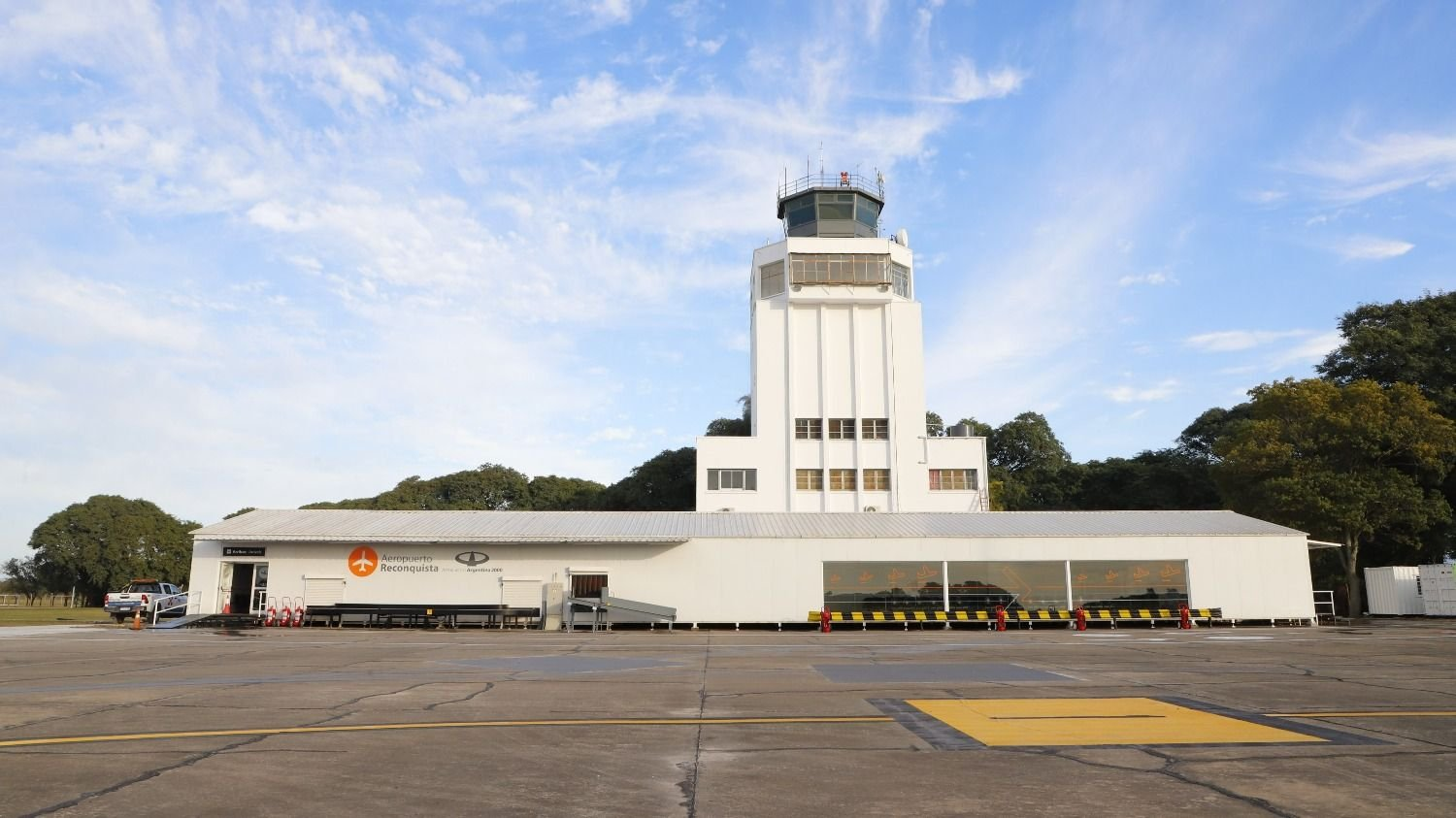
- IATA: RCQ; ICAO: SATR

Summary
- Airport type: Public
- Operator: Aeropuertos Argentina 2000
- Serves: Reconquista, Argentina
- Elevation AMSL: 161 ft (49 m)
- Coordinates: 29°12′37″S 59°41′00″W

Map
- Location of the airport in Argentina

Runways
Direction	Length		Surface
Direction	m	ft	Surface
01/19	1,260	4,134	Concrete
10/28	2,800	9,186	Concrete
- Sources: ORSNA WAD Google Maps SkyVector

Reconquista Airport (Spanish: Aeropuerto de Reconquista) (IATA: RCQ, ICAO: SATR), also known as Daniel Jukic Airport (es), is an airport serving Reconquista, a city in the Santa Fe Province of Argentina. It is a domestic airport located 6 kilometres (4 mi) south of the city.

The airfield covers an area of 756 hectares (1,870 acres) and has a 700 square metres (7,500 sq ft) terminal. The Reconquista VOR-DME (Ident: RTA) and non-directional beacon (Ident: A) are located on the field.

== Airlines and destinations ==
Airlines	Destinations
LADE	Rosario

== See also ==
- List of airports in Argentina
- Transport in Argentina
