= List of airlines of Argentina =

This is a list of airlines which have an air operator's certificate issued by the Civil Aviation Authority of Argentina.

Airline	IATA	ICAO	Callsign	Image	Commenced operations	Hub airport(s)	Notes
American Jet		AJB	AMJET		1984	Aeroparque Jorge Newbery	
Aerolíneas Argentinas	AR	ARG	ARGENTINA		1949	Ministro Pistarini International Airport	Flag carrier
Andes Líneas Aéreas	OY	ANS	AEROANDES		2006	Martín Miguel de Güemes International Airport	
JetSmart Argentina	WJ	JES	SMARTBIRD		2019	Aeroparque Jorge Newbery; Ministro Pistarini International Airport	
Líneas Aéreas del Estado	5U	LDE	LADE		1944		
TAPSA Aviación	V8	TPS	TAPSA		1991	General Enrique Mosconi International Airport	

== See also ==
- List of defunct airlines of Argentina
- List of airlines
