= Dinar Líneas Aéreas =

Argentine airline, 1992–2002

IATA	ICAO	Call sign
D7	RDN	AERO DINAR
- Commenced operations: 1992
- Ceased operations: 2002
- Operating bases: Aeroparque Jorge Newbery
- Key people: Jorge Molle (general manager)
- Employees: 620 (March 2004)

Dinar Líneas Aéreas was an Argentine airline, which operated between 1992 and 2002. It offered various charter flights as well as regular flights to different locations in Argentina and South America. In its period of greatest commercial success, Dinar was known for its safety, punctuality, and exclusive menu supervised by the chef Gato Dumas.

== History ==
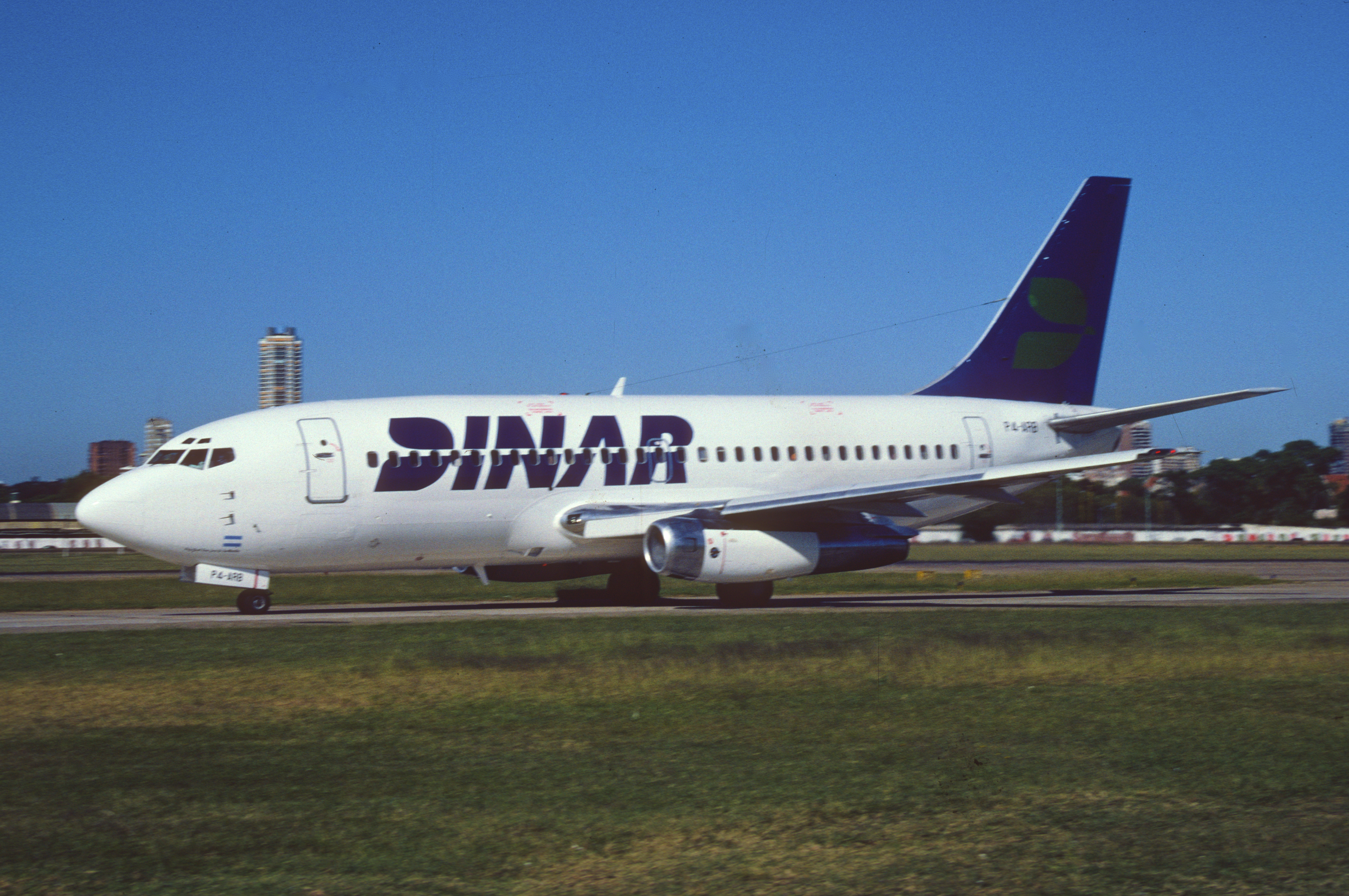
A Dinar Boeing 737-200 at Aeroparque Jorge Newbery in 1997.

The airline started operations in 1992, initially serving tourist destinations on a charter basis. Scheduled flights commenced in 1994. At March 2000, Dinar served the following scheduled destinations: Buenos Aires, Comodoro Rivadavia, Córdoba, Jujuy, Mar del Plata, Mendoza, Puerto Madryn, Río Gallegos, Salta, Santiago del Estero and Tucumán. The airline was acquired by American Falcon in August 2002 for an undisclosed price. The new owner would absorb a US$30,000,000 (equivalent to $53,700,278 in 2025) debt. In February 2003, Dinar was grounded for failing to comply with the local regulations regarding wet-leased aircraft. Operations resumed on 11 March 2003. Since August 2002, the airline went through several groundings and ownership changes.

At March 2004, the general manager was Jorge Molle, who employed 620 people. The airline's main base at this time was Aeroparque Jorge Newbery.

== Fleet ==
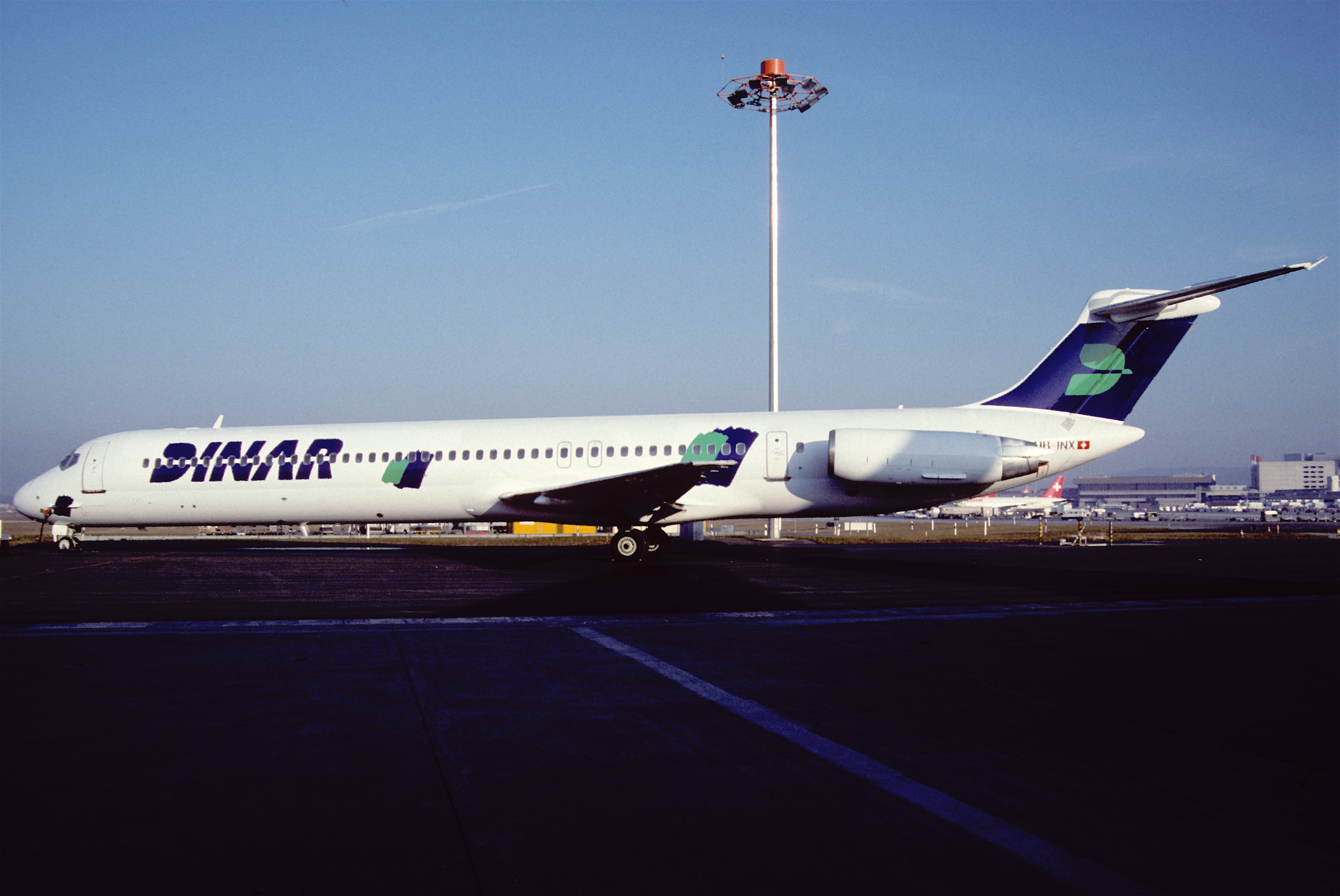
Former Dinar McDonnell Douglas MD-81

Dinar operated the following aircraft:

- Boeing 737-200
- Boeing 757-200
- Douglas DC-9-40
- McDonnell Douglas MD-81
- Fokker F-28 Mk 1000

== See also ==
- List of defunct airlines of South America
