= LATAM Airlines Argentina =

Argentine airline

IATA	ICAO	Call sign
4M	DSM	LANAR
- Founded: March 2005
- Ceased operations: June 17, 2020
- Hubs: Aeroparque Jorge Newbery
- Secondary hubs: Ministro Pistarini International Airport
- Frequent-flyer program: LATAM Pass
- Alliance: Oneworld (2007–20; affiliate)
- Fleet size: 13
- Destinations: 17
- Parent company: LATAM Airlines Group (49%)
- Headquarters: Buenos Aires, Argentina
- Key people: Rosario Altgelt (CEO)
- Website: www.latam.com

Aero 2000 S.A., d/b/a LATAM Airlines Argentina, formerly LAN Argentina, was an airline based in Buenos Aires, Argentina, and a member of the LATAM Airlines Group. It was the second-largest airline in Argentina at the time it was disbanded.

== History ==
Prior to its acquisition by LAN Airlines, the airline was known by its legal name, Aero 2000. LAN Argentina became an affiliate member of the Oneworld airline alliance on April 1, 2007, but left on May 1, 2020. The airline was owned by LATAM Airlines Group (49%) and Argentine investors (51%).

On August 28, 2013, an Argentine judge blocked the government's plan to break a long-term lease of hangar space to LAN in Aeroparque Jorge Newbery, which was seen as vital to the airline's operations.

As its parent company LAN merged with TAM Linhas Aéreas and rebranded to form LATAM Airlines, LAN Argentina also rebranded to LATAM Argentina.

LATAM Airlines agreed to pay more than $22 million in civil and criminal fines relating to a decade-old Argentine bribery case. The U.S. Securities and Exchange Commission said the fine of LATAM related to "improper payments it authorized during a dispute between the airline and its union employees in Argentina". LAN was accused of using an Argentine consultant to negotiate with unions on the company's behalf and paid the consultant via a sham contract that channeled funds to corrupt union officials. The scheme had violated the accounting provisions of the Foreign Corrupt Practices Act, the U.S. Justice Department said, and the airline agreed to pay a $12.75 million criminal penalty. It will pay a further $9.4 million, including interest, to settle the SEC's charges of inadequate accounting controls.

In May 2020, the LATAM Airlines Group filed for Chapter 11 bankruptcy protection; however, its branches in Argentina and Paraguay were not included in the restructuring filing.

On June 17, 2020, LATAM Argentina's parent, the LATAM Airlines Group, announced it would cease operations of the Argentine subsidiary, with all aircraft returned to lessors and all employees laid off immediately. The COVID-19 pandemic had upended the airline industry around the world but especially in Latin America, where governments were reluctant to offer state aid to airlines while also imposing more-restrictive travel bans than in other regions. The airline was the second largest in Argentina, after flag carrier Aerolíneas Argentinas, and operated around 16% of flights in the country in 2019. It was the only significant competitor to Aerolíneas Argentinas, which held around 63% of the domestic market share before the pandemic.

== Destinations ==
LATAM Argentina operated scheduled domestic services from Buenos Aires to Bariloche, Córdoba, Comodoro Rivadavia, El Calafate, Mendoza, Puerto Iguazú, Neuquén, Río Gallegos, Salta, San Juan, Tucumán and Ushuaia, and international services to Lima, Miami, Punta del Este, Santiago and São Paulo. Its main bases were Jorge Newbery Airport for its short-haul operations and Ministro Pistarini International Airport for its long-haul operations, both located in Buenos Aires.

== Fleet ==
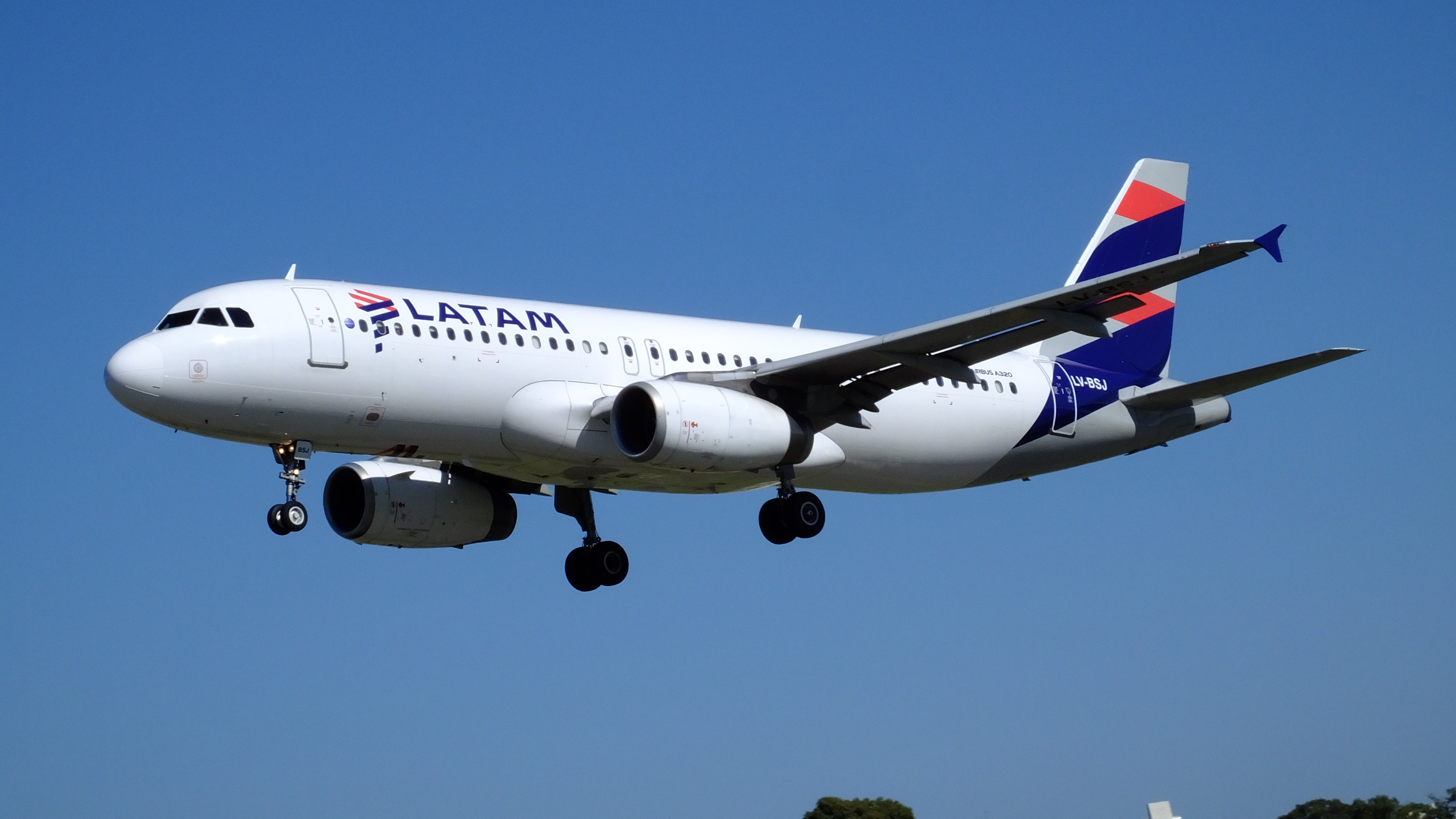
A LATAM Argentina Airbus A320-200 approaching Aeroparque Jorge Newbery in 2017

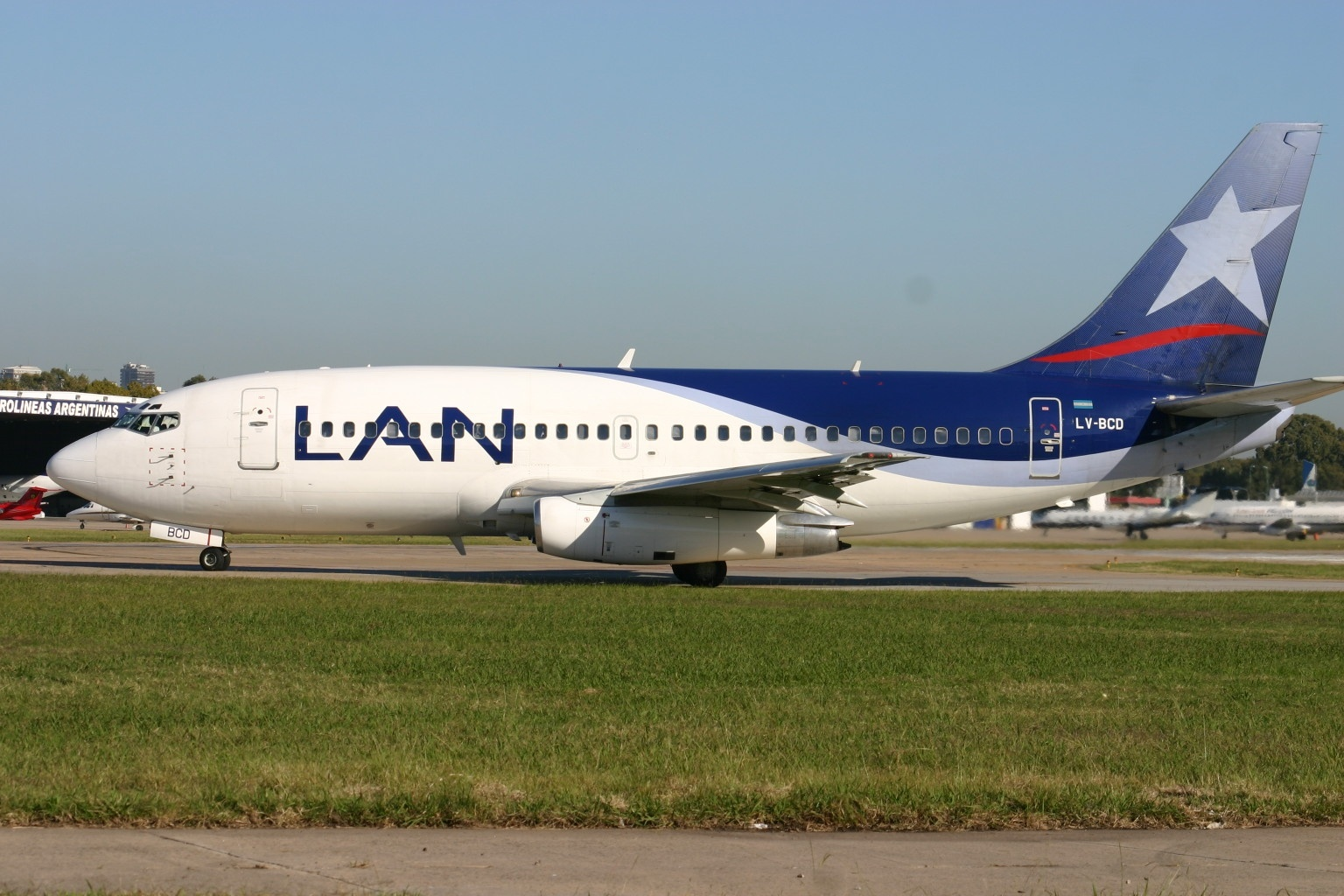
A former LAN Argentina Boeing 737-200 at Aeroparque Jorge Newbery in 2006

At the time the airline ceased operations in June 2020, LATAM Argentina's fleet consisted of the following aircraft:

LATAM Argentina fleet
Aircraft	In service	Orders	Passengers			Notes
Aircraft	In service	Orders	C	Y	Total	Notes
Airbus A320-200	13	—	—	168	168	Transferred back to LATAM Chile
Total	13	—				

=== Retired fleet ===
LATAM Argentina previously operated the following aircraft:

LATAM Argentina former fleet
Aircraft	Total	Introduced	Retired	Notes
Boeing 737-200	5	2005	2008	4 leased from LAN Airlines
Boeing 767-300ER	11	2006	2019	

== See also ==
- List of defunct airlines of Argentina
