= LADE =

Argentinian airline

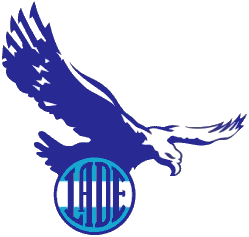

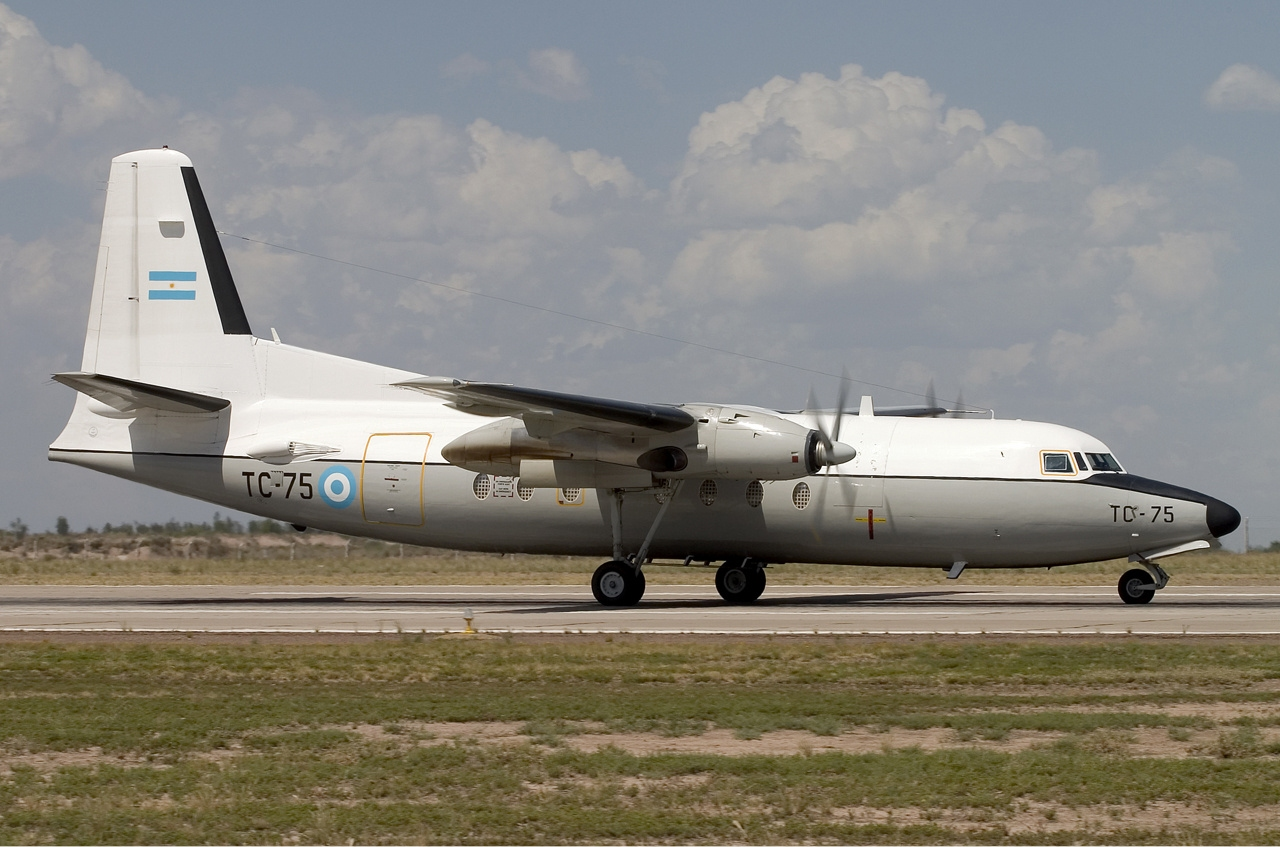
- Fokker F.27-400M Troopship
IATA	ICAO	Call sign
5U	LDE	LADE
- Founded: September 1940
- Fleet size: 4
- Destinations: 30
- Headquarters: El Palomar, Buenos Aires, Argentina
- Website: lade.faa.mil.ar

Líneas Aéreas del Estado (LADE, English: State Air Lines) is an airline based in Comodoro Rivadavia, Argentina. It is owned by the government of Argentina and operated by the Argentine Air Force. It provides domestic scheduled services, mainly in Patagonia.

== History ==
The airline was established as an arm of the Argentine Air Force in September 1940 to service unprofitable routes to remote areas. It was initially known as Líneas Aéreas Suroeste and consolidated under the present title in 1945 with another air force branch, Líneas Aéreas Noreste. By April 1960, DC-3s, DC-4s and Vikings made up LADE's fleet.

At March 1970, LADE had 150 employees and its fleet consisted of 14 DC-3s, two DC-4s, three DC-6s and six de Havilland Canada DHC-6 Twin Otters. The carrier started regular flights between Comodoro Rivadavia and the Falkland Islands in 1972. The Comodoro Rivadavia–Port Stanley run was initially operated with F27 equipment. The limited length of the runway at Port Stanley Airport resulted in weight regulations to the aircraft operating the route, which restricted the number of carried passengers to a maximum of 22 per flight, along with a reduced volume of mail and freight. The service was discontinued in 1982, following the Falklands War.

At July 1980, the airline had a fleet of 11 F27s (five F27-600s and six F27-400Ms) five Fokker F28-1000Cs and seven Twin Otters. Ten years later, at March 1990, the fleet had grown to include five Fokker F28-1000Cs, 13 F27s (six F27-400Ms, two F27-500s and five F27-600s), one Lockheed L-100-30 and seven Twin Otters. At March 2004, LADE served a comprehensive domestic network that included scheduled services to Bahía Blanca, Buenos Aires, Comodoro Rivadavia, El Calafate, El Palomar, Gobernador Gregores, Lago Argentino, Mar del Plata, Miramar, Neuquén, Paraná, Puerto Madryn, Río Gallegos, Río Grande, San Antonio Oeste, San Carlos de Bariloche, San Martín de los Andes, Trelew, Ushuaia and Viedma. The fleet at this time consisted of Twin Otters, Fokker F27s, Fokker F28s and one Lockheed L-100-30 Hercules. From December 2008 four Saab 340s replaced four Fokker F27s at a cost of US$34 million.

== Services ==
LADE offers additional services like domestic cargo flights and catering.

== Destinations ==
LADE operates services to the following domestic scheduled destinations (as of May 2026):

- Bahía Blanca (Comandante Espora Airport)
- Bariloche (San Carlos de Bariloche Airport)
- Ciudad Autónoma de Buenos Aires (Aeroparque Jorge Newbery)
- Comodoro Rivadavia (General Enrique Mosconi International Airport)
- El Calafate (Comandante Armando Tola International Airport)
- Mar del Plata (Astor Piazzolla Airport)
- Perito Moreno (Perito Moreno Airport)
- Río Gallegos (Piloto Civil N. Fernández International Airport)
- Río Grande (Hermes Quijada International Airport)
- Ushuaia (Malvinas Argentinas International Airport)

== Fleet ==
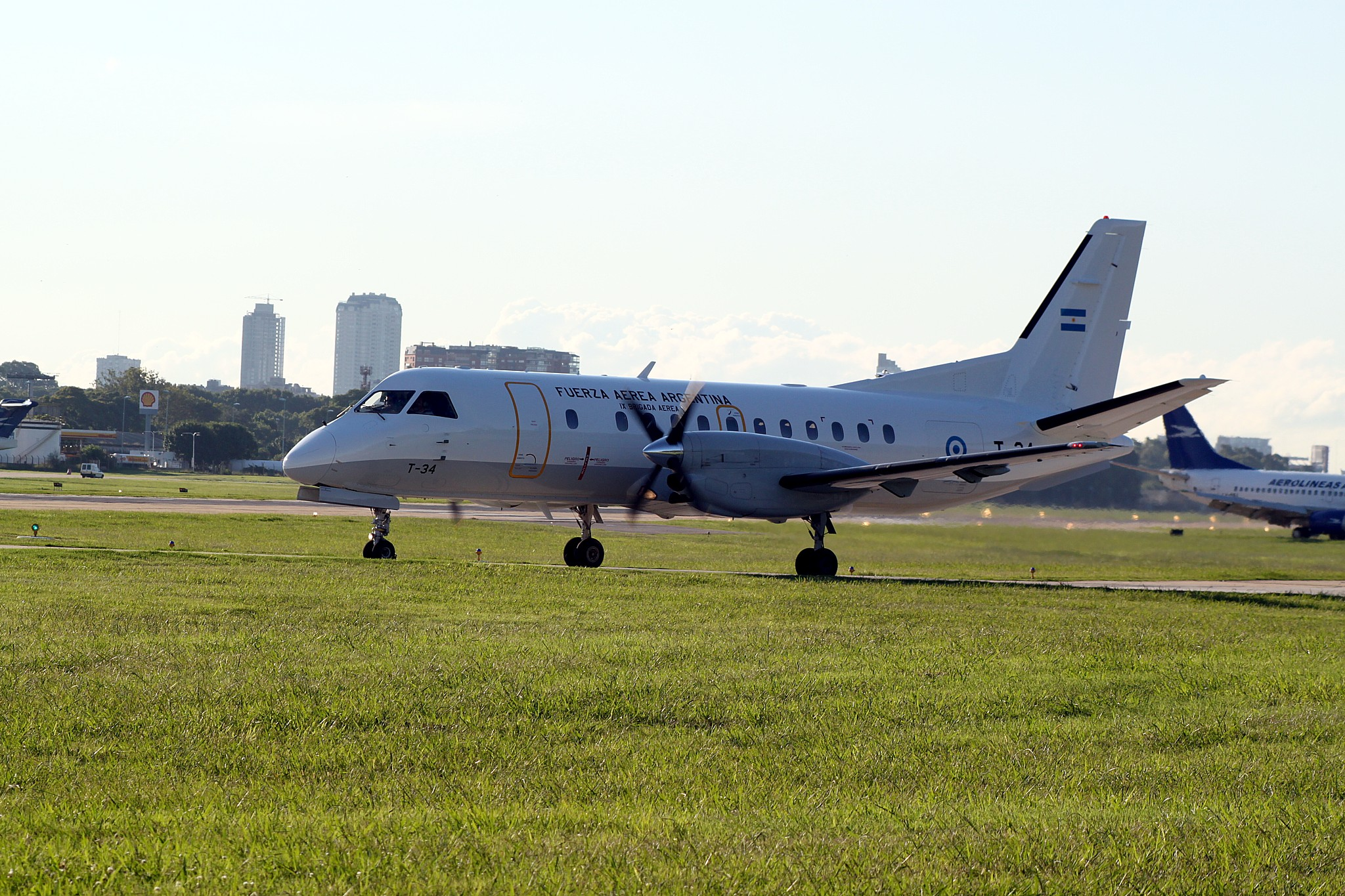
Saab 340

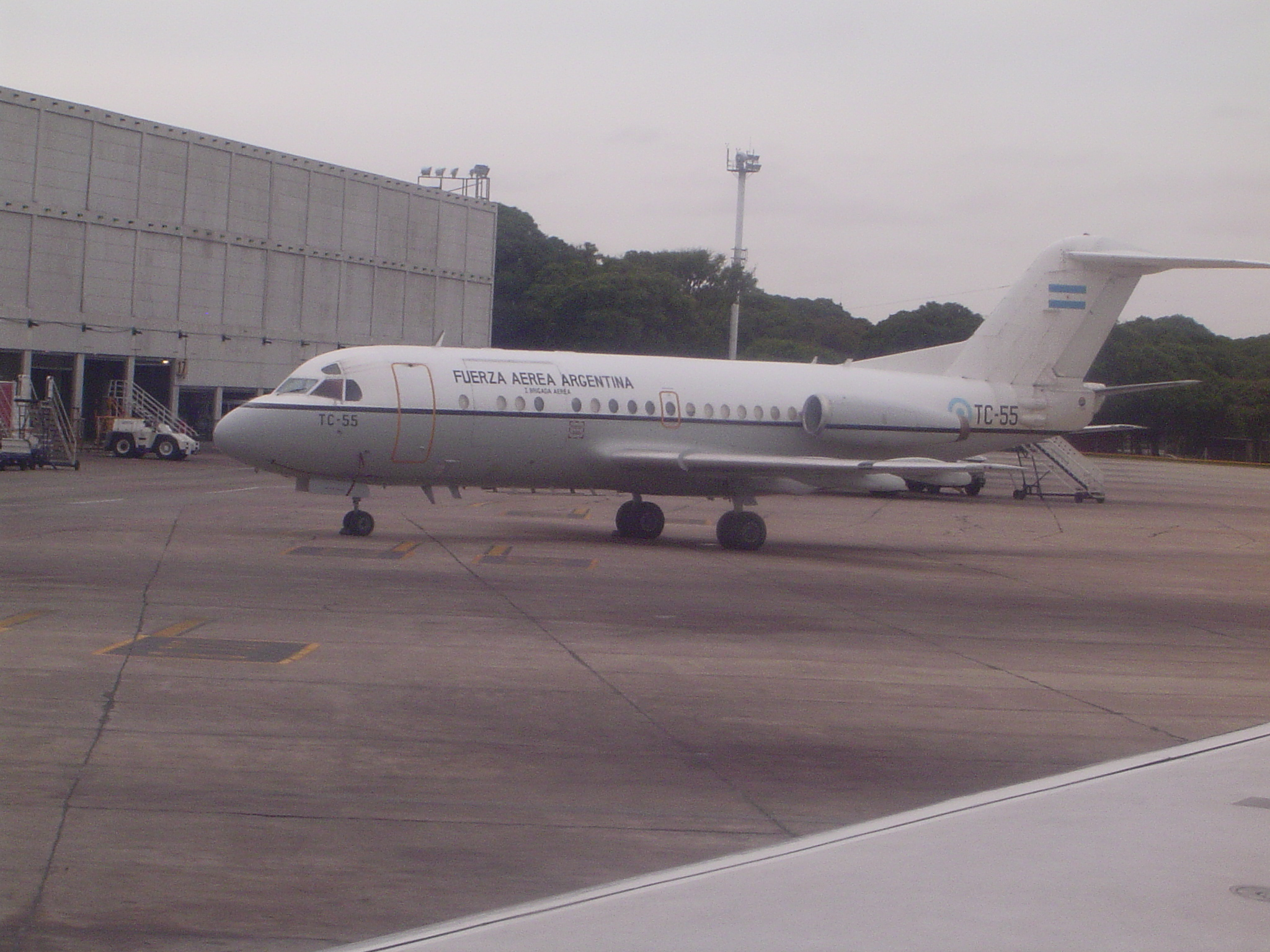
Fokker F28

The LADE - Líneas Aéreas del Estado fleet consists of the following aircraft (as of April 2021)

- 4 Saab 340B
- 1 Fokker F28
- 1 de Havilland Canada DHC-6 Twin Otter
- 1 Boeing 737-700

Those aircraft are for regular flights.

The air force cargo fleet is leased by LADE, consisting of:

- 2 Lockheed Martin C-130H Hercules
- 1 Lockheed Martin KC-130H Hercules

Two surviving Lockheed Martin C-130B Hercules were retired by the air force in 2011, while the sole Lockheed Martin L-100-30 Hercules has been inoperative since early 2010.

There is a Presidential Fleet which is normally not assigned to LADE:

- 1 Boeing 757-200, callsign Tango 01
- 1 Fokker F28 Mk4000, callsign Tango 02
- 1 Fokker F28 Mk1000, callsign Tango 03

The rest of the fleet is inoperative:

- 2 Boeing 707-320B
- 7 De Havilland Canada DHC-6 Twin Otter Series 200
- 2 Fokker F28 Mk1000

As of June 2012 nearly all flights were operated by Saab 340 aircraft, with the Fokker F28 fleet flying exclusively for the air force. Fokker F27s were withdrawn from the LADE schedules in April 2009, although they have since been known to operate LADE flights now and again.

== Accidents and incidents ==
Date	Location	Aircraft	Tail number	Aircraft damage	Fatalities	Description	Refs
31 January 1993	Recife	Boeing 707	LV-ISA	W/O	0	Collapse of the right main landing gear after touchdown caused the aircraft to veer of the runway and collide with a structure on the ground.	
16 June 1995	Jeremie	F27-400M	TC-73	W/O	0	Collapse of left main landing gear on touchdown at Jeremie Airport. The aircraft ran off the runway and crashed into a building.	
8 November 1995	Villa Dolores	F27-400M	TC-72	W/O	53/53	Crashed into mountainous terrain in bad weather while flying the last leg of a domestic non-scheduled Comodoro Rivadavia–Villa Reynolds–Córdoba.	
23 October 1996	Buenos Aires	Boeing 707	LV-LGP	W/O	2/8	During landing, the aircraft entered a rapid descent caused by high flaps being extended to quickly. The aircraft crashed before the runway threshold, breaking apart and killing both pilots.	
17 May 2001	Mendoza, Argentina	Fokker F27 Friendship	TC-76	W/O	5/5	Loss of power to the right-hand engine after take-off caused the aircraft to enter a stall. The aircraft lost control and crashed 300 meters from the runway.	

== See also ==
- List of airlines of Argentina
- Transport in Argentina
