= Accidents and incidents involving the An-12 family =

List of model-specific aviation incidents

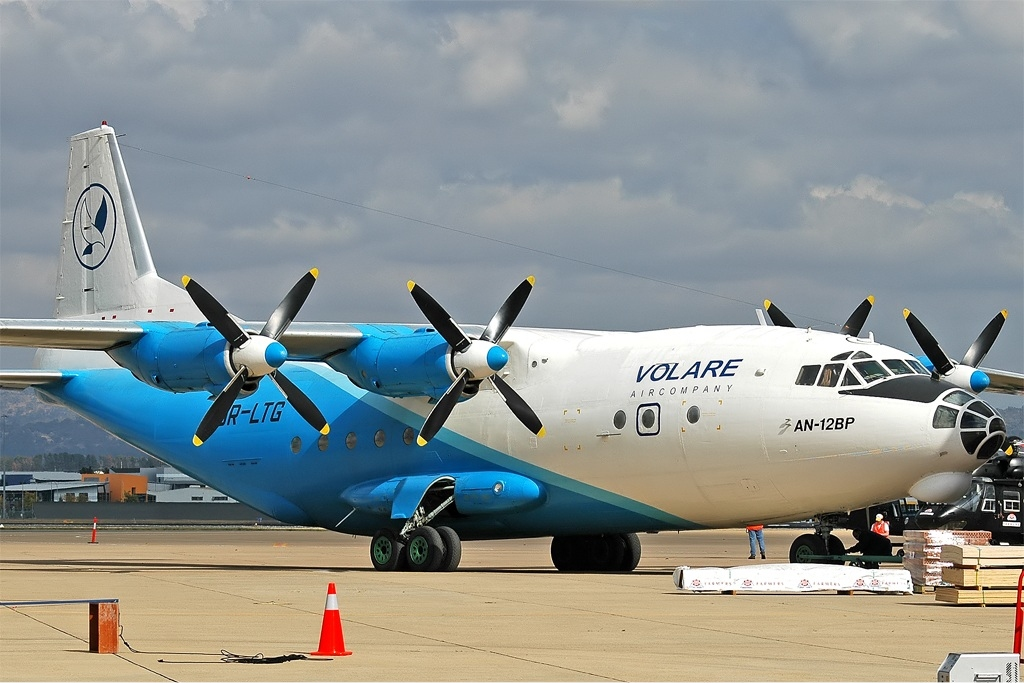
A Volare Airlines Antonov An-12BP at Canberra Airport

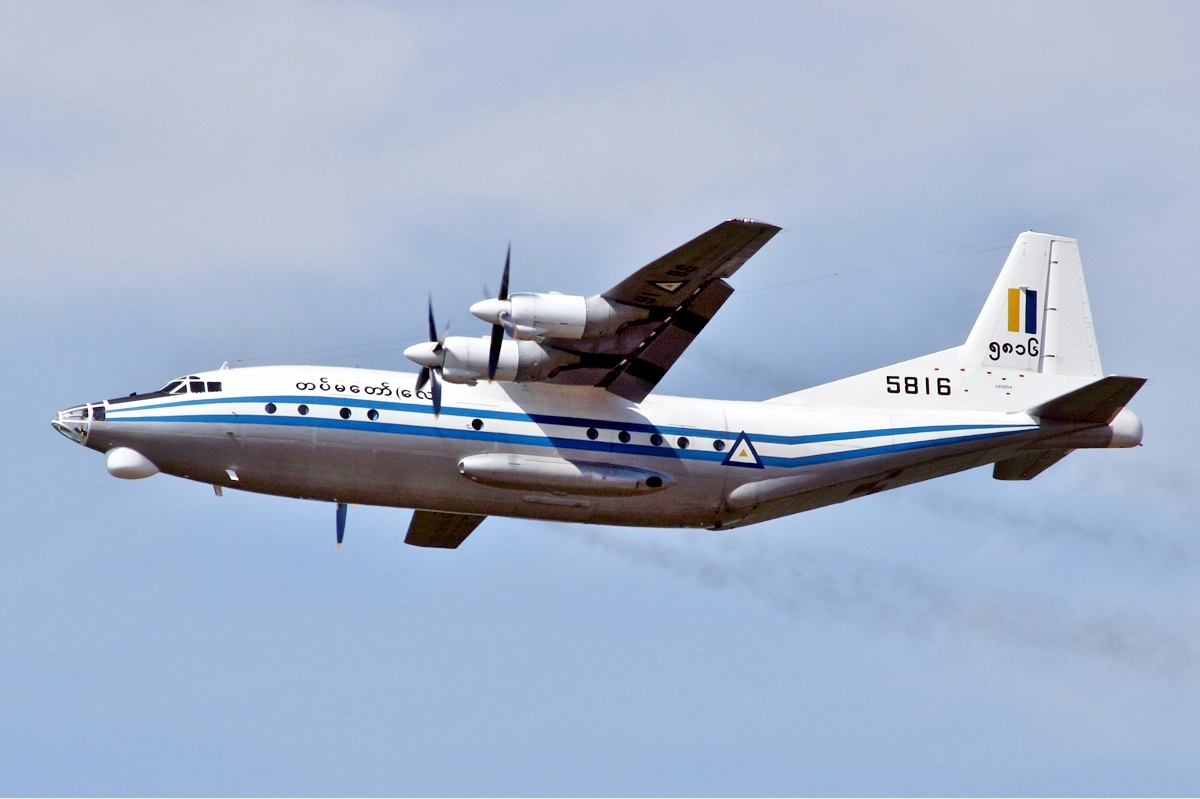
A Shaanxi Y-8 of the Myanmar Air Force

The Antonov An-12 is a transport aircraft designed and manufactured by the Soviet/Ukrainian manufacturing and services company Antonov. Given the long operational history of the An-12, more than 190 An-12s (including Shaanxi Y-8s) have crashed involving many casualties. The An-12 has also been involved in a number of aviation incidents.

== Crashes during testing ==
- On 26 June 1958, a prototype incurred heavy damage as the demonstration flight ground looped at the time of landing in Khodynka Aerodrome, Russia. The status of the aircraft is unknown.

== Crashes in service ==
=== 1950s ===
- On 31 January 1959, a Soviet Air Force An-12 crashed on take-off at Vitebsk Airport, when a trimmer changed position unintentionally and a prop feathered simultaneously. Of the seven crew on board, only the tail gunner survived. This was the first fatal incident involving the Antonov An-12.
- On 28 November 1959, a Soviet Air Force An-12 crashed near Irkutsk following a loss of control at 3,300 m (10,800 ft), killing all 10 on board. The brand-new aircraft was being ferried from the factory at Irkutsk to the Soviet Air Force base at Vitebsk.

=== 1960s ===
- On 23 December 1962, a Soviet Air Force An-12 struck a mountainside near Nezhdannyj Airfield (near Norilsk), killing seven of eight crew. The aircraft, operating a Kiev–Norilsk–Tixi flight, had been cleared to descend too low.
- On 16 July 1963, Indian Air Force An-12A BL734 crashed on landing at Palam Airport, killing two people.
- On 7 December 1963, Aeroflot Flight 1063, an An-12B (CCCP-11347), crashed on climbout from Kirensk Airport after a loss of control following double engine failure, killing the six crew. The aircraft was operating a Kirensk-Irkutsk cargo service.
- On 16 October 1964, Indonesian Air Force An-12BP T-1202 crashed near Palembang, killing three of 16 on board. The aircraft was carrying members of a dancing troupe and television performers en route to entertain troops.
- On 7 July 1965, a Soviet Air Force An-12 crashed shortly after takeoff from Almaza Air Base, Egypt, killing 30 of 31 on board. After takeoff, the crew raised the flaps, causing the aircraft to sink back on the runway, after which it struck a concrete pillar and crashed into a ravine and burned out.
- On 11 September 1965, an Aeroflot An-12 (CCCP-11137) struck a wooded mountainside 32 km (20 mi) northwest of Ulan-Ude due to an improperly set altimeter, killing all eight crew.
- On 14 January 1967, Aeroflot Flight 5003, an An-12B (CCCP-04343), crashed on climbout from Tolmachevo Airport following an in-flight fire, killing the six crew. The aircraft was operating a Novosibirsk-Krasnoyarsk cargo service.
- On 9 February 1967, a Cubana An-12A (CU-T827) crashed near Mexico City due to pilot error, killing all 10 on board. The pilot executed an improper IFR approach and discontinued IFR flight too soon.
- On 6 March 1967, an Aeroflot An-12B (CCCP-11007) stalled and crashed on takeoff from Salekhard Airport, killing six of seven crew. The crew failed to select flaps before takeoff.
- On 30 June 1967, an An-12 operated by the Scientific Research Institute of Automatic Devices (НИИ автоматических устройств, NII avtomaticheskikh ustroystv) crashed near Mitino, Russia during a test flight, killing all nine on board. The aircraft was testing a cargo release system with a BMP-1. When the rear cargo door opened and the parachutes were released, the BMP-1 was to fall out of the aircraft but it became jammed and then turned around and was lodged in the rear of the aircraft. The four parachutes then deployed causing a large amount of drag that finally freed the BMP-1, but the rear fuselage was damaged in the process. The now-weakened tail section separated and control was lost and the aircraft crashed and exploded.
- On 7 February 1968, an Indian Air Force An-12 from Squadron 25 (tail number BL534 and operating as Flight 203) crashed in the Rohtang Pass, killing all 4 crew and 98 passengers. The remains of a person from the missing aircraft were discovered and identified in 2003, but the fate of the aircraft was unknown until a search party found the wreckage buried in snow in August 2005. Three more bodies were recovered in an Indian Army expedition in August 2007, and remains of another soldier were recovered on 22 August 2013. In 2018, a mountaineering team rediscovered the wreckage along with remains of a soldier. On 18 August 2019, an Indian Army-Indian Air Force joint team recovered several parts of the aircraft like an engine, fuselage, electric circuits, propeller, fuel tank unit, air brake assembly and a cockpit door. In September 2024, four more bodies were found, and three of the four were identified.
- On 3 June 1969, two Soviet Air Force An-12s collided in midair at night near Pskov, killing all 14 on board both aircraft.
- On 23 June 1969, a Soviet Air Force An-12BP (call sign "08525") flying in formation with two others collided with Aeroflot Flight 831, an Ilyushin Il-14 (CCCP-52018), over Yukhnov, Russia, killing all 120 on board both the aircraft.
- On 12 August 1969, Aeroflot Flight 5134, an An-12B (CCCP-11018) crashed while on approach to Novosibirsk due to a loss of engine power, killing four of six crew.
- On 8 September 1969, an Aeroflot An-12B (CCCP-11377) was taxiing at Amderma Airport when it was struck in the nose by a crashing Soviet Air Force Tupolev Tu-128 that had veered off the runway following landing gear failure, killing both pilots of the Tu-128 and five of eight on board the An-12.
- On 1 October 1969, a Soviet Air Force An-12 crashed near Pskov during a nighttime formation training flight in bad weather, killing six of seven on board. The tailing An-12 straightened its course and overtook the leading An-12, but the tail gun penetrated the cockpit, killing the pilot of that An-12. The co-pilot panicked and bailed out; the now-pilotless An-12 then crashed.
- On 13 November 1969, Aeroflot Flight 5009, an An-12TB (CCCP-11376), stalled and crashed on approach to Amderma Airport for reasons unknown, killing all nine on board. The cause of the crash was not determined, but after two similar crashes in 1971, it was determined that a stall caused by wing icing was the cause along with design defects.
- On 6 December 1969, Aeroflot Flight 5135, an An-12PL (CCCP-11381), stalled and crashed on approach to Khantanga Airport due to heavy icing, killing all eight on board.

=== 1970s ===
- On 1 October 1970, an Aeroflot An-12B (CCCP-11031) crashed on takeoff from Kamenny Mys following double engine failure and loss of power from a third engine due to fuel system problems, killing all eight on board.
- On 28 October 1970, a Soviet Air Force An-12B stalled and crashed at Severny Air Base while attempting a go-around in bad weather, killing the six crew.
- On 22 January 1971, an Aeroflot An-12B (CCCP-11000) stalled and crashed on approach to Surgut Airport due to wing icing, killing all 14 on board.
- On 31 January 1971, an Aeroflot An-12B (CCCP-12996) also stalled and crashed on approach to Surgut Airport due to wing icing, killing the seven crew. Following this crash and three other crashes in 1969 and 1971, improvements were made to the air bleed control system including indicators to show the position of the hot air intake valve. Test flights were carried out to clarify aerodynamics of the An-12 in icing conditions.
- On 16 August 1971, Indian Air Force An-12A BL918 struck a hill near Ahmednagar during a practice bombing run, killing 11.
- On 26 May 1972, a Soviet Air Force An-12 crashed at Panevézys, Lithuania, killing five of the six crew. During a nighttime formation flight in bad weather, the aircraft lost sight of the leading aircraft following a descent to minimum safe altitude. While attempting to regain visual contact with the leading aircraft, the pilot failed to watch the altitude properly and the aircraft struck the ground.
- On 23 October 1972, two Soviet Air Force An-12BPs collided in mid-air over Tula Airport, killing all 27 on board both aircraft.
- On 6 March 1973, an An-12AP operated by Aeroflot crashed on approach while trying to land on Graham Bell Island for unknown reasons. Nobody was injured but the plane was written off as the result of the crash. The wreckage was not removed from the crash site.
- On 2 October 1973, Aeroflot Flight 10178, an An-12TB (CCCP-12967) struck a hillside near Magadan after deviating from the flight route during a go-around, killing all 10 on board.
- On 7 January 1974, a Soviet Air Force An-12BP stalled and crashed while on final approach to Vitebsk due to icing, killing 26 of 31 on board. The crew did not properly use the deicing system and ice accumulated on the flight surfaces of the aircraft.
- On 1 May 1974, an Aeroflot An-12B (CCCP-12950) struck an ice pinnacle at Polar Station SP-22 during an emergency takeoff, killing one of 16 on board.
- On 18 October 1974, an Aeroflot An-12B (CCCP-11030) struck trees and crashed while descending for Yeniseisk in bad weather, killing one of 12 on board.
- On 21 January 1977, a Soviet Air Force An-12BK-PPS collided with a Sukhoi Su-11 over Krestsy during a practice aircraft jamming flight, killing all nine on board both aircraft.
- On 13 May 1977, a LOT Polish Airlines An-12 (SP-LZA) operating a cargo flight carrying a cargo of veal from Warsaw, Poland, to Beirut, Lebanon, via Varna, Bulgaria, crashed near Aramoun, Lebanon, killing all nine people on board. The aircraft had been approaching Beirut International Airport, but the pilots had encountered language difficulties when communicating with the local air traffic controllers, so that they likely lost the orientation.
- On 19 November 1978, Indian Air Force An-12B L950 crashed near Leh Airport, killing all 77 on board; a woman on the ground also died when the aircraft struck a hut.
- In 1978, an Aeroflot An-12BP (CCCP-11125) suffered damage when a container filled with acid broke during landing and was withdrawn from use due to severe corrosion. The aircraft was cancelled from the Soviet register in 1978; the incident could have occurred between 1972 and 1978.
- On 24 August 1979, Aeroflot Flight 22000, an An-12TB (CCCP-12963) force-landed on a wooded hillside near Yeniseisk after all four engines failed due to fuel contamination, killing 11 of 16 on board.

=== 1980s ===
- On 7 January 1980, a Soviet Air Force An-12BP veered off the runway on landing at Kabul Airport and crashed into a rocket launcher, killing the navigator. The aircraft was repaired and returned to service.
- On 28 October 1980, Aeroflot Flight 1531, an An-12B (CCCP-11104) struck Mount Valsi-Karniaba, Afghanistan (16 mi from Kabul Airport) in poor weather, killing the six crew. Wreckage was found on 4 November 1980.
- On 24 August 1982, a Soviet Air Force An-12BP crashed near Chita after all four engines failed due to fuel contamination; all seven crew bailed out but one did not survive.
- On 15 February 1983, a Soviet Air Force An-12 was shot down by a SAM missile while on approach to Jalalabad Airport, killing the five crew.
- On 2 July 1983, a Soviet Air Force An-12 was struck by ground fire and crashed just after takeoff from Jalalabad Airport, killing the five crew.
- On 11 November 1983, a Soviet Air Force An-12 crashed near Burevestnik, killing all 30 on board. Wreckage was found in January 1984.
- On 21 November 1983, Soviet Air Force An-12 39 crashed near Senkovo due to icing, killing the nine crew.
- On 15 January 1984, Ethiopian Air Force An-12 1506 was reportedly hit by an SA-7 missile. The aircraft stalled and crashed near Tessenei Airport in Eritrea, resulting of the deaths of 26 on board.
- On 18 January 1984, Soviet Air Force An-12 CCCP-11429 was struck by a missile and crashed 25 mi south of Mazar-i-Sharif Airport while attempting a forced landing, killing the eight crew.
- On 16 February 1984, Ethiopian Air Force An-12 1509 was hijacked by a man demanding to be flown to Somalia. The hijacker detonated a grenade when he realized the aircraft was flying to Debre Zeit and the aircraft crashed afterward, reportedly killing 26 of 38 on board.
- On 5 August 1984, Soviet Navy An-12B CCCP-10232 encountered turbulence and hail at 5,500 m (18,000 ft) en route from Aden to Tashkent. Hail damaged the weather radar and engine oil coolers, causing oil leaks. All four engines lost power; engines one and three were shut down and engines two and four were reduced to idle. The aircraft entered a descent, but speed and load limits were exceeded in the process and the aircraft broke up and crashed at Nawabshah, Pakistan, killing all 24 on board.
- On 24 September 1984, a Soviet Air Force An-12 was struck by anti-aircraft fire near Zaranj, Afghanistan, killing a crew member; the aircraft was repaired and returned to service.
- On 15 October 1984, Soviet Air Force An-12BP CCCP-11405 was unloading cargo at Khost Airport when it was struck by mortar fire, killing a crew member and injuring several others. The aircraft was able to take off and return to Kabul, where 150 punctures from shrapnel were found in the fuselage.
- On 11 July 1985, a Soviet Air Force An-12 was shot down by a missile and crashed near Kandahar, killing all 14 on board. After takeoff from Kandahar, the crew did not climb to a safe altitude, but continued to Shindand instead.
- On 25 September 1985, a MAP Kom-na-Amu APO An-12 (CCCP-69321) crashed in a field near Rakitnoye, Ukraine due to wing separation following an engine fire, killing all nine on board. The fire was caused by a fuel leak.
- On 25 November 1985, an Aeroflot An-12 (CCCP-11747) en route from Cuito Cuanavale to Luanda was shot down by South African Special Forces and crashed approximately 43 km of Menongue, the provincial center of the Cuando Cubango province, Angola, killing eight crew members and 13 passengers on board.
- On 25 March 1986, a MOM "Polyot" Omsk An-12AP (CCCP-11795) crashed on approach to Omsk Airport after descending too low in bad weather, killing all nine on board.
- On 29 November 1986, a Soviet Air Force An-12 was shot down by a Stinger missile while climbing to 6,400 m (21,000 ft) and crashed near Kabul, Afghanistan, killing all 29 on board.
- On 27 December 1986, a Soviet Air Force An-12 was struck by a Stinger missile 43 mi from Kabul Airport, causing a fire in the number one engine, but the fire could not be extinguished. A crew member bailed out, but because his parachute never opened due to the insufficient height, he did not survive. The aircraft continued to Kabul where it landed safely.
- On 13 January 1987, an Ethiopian Air Force An-12 crashed while attempting to return to Asmara International Airport, killing all 54 on board.
- On 19 October 1987, a MAP Kom-na-Amu APO An-12BK (CCCP-12162) overran the runway on takeoff from Komsomol'sk-na-Amure Airport, killing all nine on board. The aircraft failed to lift off due to a snow-covered runway.
- On 21 October 1987, a Soviet Air Force An-12BK collided on the runway with a Mil Mi-24 while taking off from Kabul Airport, killing 18 of 19 on board.
- On 8 March 1988, Indian Air Force An-12B L2174 crashed near Charbatia Air Base following an in-flight fire, killing the nine crew and eight people on the ground
- On 1 September 1988, a Soviet Air Force An-12BK-PPS stalled and crashed near Privolzhsky Air Base after the crew deviated from the approach pattern and glide scope, killing the eight crew.
- On 4 October 1988, an Aeroflot An-12BP (CCCP-11418) struck a mountain 16 mi from Batagay, Russia after the crew intentionally deviated from the approach course, killing the six crew.
- On 11 October 1988, a Soviet Air Force An-12 crashed into a mountain 26 mi northwest of Sandar-Marneuli, Georgia after deviating from the flight route, killing all eight on board.
- On 12 December 1988, Yugoslav Air Force An-12 YU-AID crashed into a road bridge near Yerevan, Armenia after deviating from the approach pattern, killing the seven crew. The aircraft was part of an air relief operation following the 1988 Armenian earthquake.
- On 8 July 1989, Soviet Air Force An-12BP CCCP-11875 crashed on landing at Cam Ranh Airport, Cam Ranh, Vietnam, killing 31 of 34 on board. While landing at Ho Chi Minh City the aircraft touched down too soon, ripping off the right landing gear and damaging the right outer wing, number four propeller and hydraulic systems. The crew abandoned the landing and returned to Can Ranh, but on landing the crew feathered the number one propeller, causing the aircraft to veer to the left. The aircraft veered off the runway, struck obstacles and burned out.
- On 12 October 1989, Soviet Air Force An-12BP CCCP-11229 was being refueled at Kirovabad (now Ganja), Azerbaijan, when it was struck by a Sukhoi Su-24, killing four of seven on board the An-12, one of two on board the Su-24, and two people on the ground. The Su-24 was taking off from a taxiway by mistake.

=== 1990s ===
- On 10 August 1990, an Afghan Air Force An-12 crashed shortly after takeoff from Shindand, Afghanistan, killing all 83 on board.
- On 26 November 1990, a Soviet Air Force An-12 crashed at Alma-Ata Airport (now Almaty Airport) while attempting a go-around, killing all eight on board.
- On 17 August 1991, a Soviet Air Force An-12 struck a mountain at 1,269 m (4,163 ft) some 13 mi south of Ucharal, Kazakhstan, killing all 19 on board. The aircraft, operating an Andizhan–Novosibirsk–Semipalatinsk flight, had been cleared to descend too low.
- On 23 September 1991, a Special Cargo Airlines An-12BP (CCCP-13320) crashed short of the runway at Khatanga, Russia following fuel exhaustion, killing one of 16 on board. The aircraft was overloaded and had been refueled with too little fuel to take more cargo and the crew had made mistakes in calculating fuel consumption.
- On 16 November 1991, a Soviet Air Force An-12 crashed near Amderma Airport after the crew descended too soon in poor weather, killing 20 of 22 on board.
- On 22 June 1992, a Krasnoyarsk Airlines An-12A (CCCP-11896) stalled and crashed at Norilsk Airport, killing 10 of 12 on board. The crew had made the decision to land too soon, before visual contact with the runway lights.
- On 5 July 1992, Sri Lanka Air Force Y-8D CR872 crashed near Iyakachchi, Sri Lanka, killing all 19 on board; the aircraft was probably shot down by Tamil rebels.
- On 14 July 1992, a Russian Air Force An-12 crashed and caught fire at Nakhichevan Airport, Azerbaijan following an aborted takeoff, killing 29 of 34 on board.
- On 14 July 1992 a Yemeni Air Force An-12 crashed in bad weather when it tried to land at Bir Fabr, east of Sanaa, killing all 58 people on board.
- On 24 July 1992, a Volga-Dnepr Airlines An-12BK (CCCP-11342) struck a mountain near Lisec, North Macedonia after going off course to avoid a thunderstorm, killing all eight on board.
- On 26 April 1993, a UN An-12B (CCCP-11121) force-landed in a field near Luena, Angola after the number one engine was hit by a SAM missile; one crew member (of seven crew) died after stepping on a land mine.
- On 23 August 1993, a Russian Air Force An-12 suffered partial electrical failure 40 minutes after takeoff due to a short circuit. Engines two and three failed at 4,800 m (15,700 ft) and the crew began an emergency descent to Gurmak. But while descending through 1,700 m (5,600 ft), engine one failed and the crew attempted a forced landing, but the aircraft struck a tree, crashed near Krasnoslobodsk, Volgograd region and burned out, killing the six crew.
- On 24 February 1994, Pulkovo Aviation Enterprise Flight 9045, an An-12BP (RA-11118), stalled and crashed on approach to Nalchik due to tail icing, killing all 13 on board. The aircraft was carrying 12,515 kg (27,591 lb) of coins from Saint Petersburg to Nalchik via Volgograd.
- On 5 August 1994, a Russian Air Force An-12 struck a hilltop near Bada Air Base after the crew deviated from the approach pattern and glide path in poor visibility, killing all 47 on board.
- On 29 October 1994, an Aeronika An-12A (RA-11790) crashed short of the runway at Ust-Ilimsk Airport due to possible icing, killing all 23 on board.
- On 18 November 1995, Sri Lanka Air Force Y-8D CR871 was shot down by LTTE rebels while on approach to Palaly Air Force Base, killing five of six on board. The aircraft had been leased from Helitours.
- On 27 February 1996, an Aero Tropical An-12BP (ER-ACE) crashed 22 mi from Lukapa, Angola in poor visibility, killing all eight on board.
- On 6 October 1996, a Savanair An-12B (RA-11101) leased from GosNII GA, landed 250m down the runway of Lukapa Airport, Angola. During the rollout, runway lighting failed and the aircraft ran off the runway, fell into a ditch and collided with a house. A total of one of six crew and five of thirteen passengers were killed.
- On 17 December 1996, Russian Air Force An-12RR 21 red crashed near Andreapol Air Base due to wing icing, killing all 17 on board.
- On 12 March 1997, an Alada An-12BP (RA-11531) crashed short of the runway at Lukapa in dense fog, killing all 16 on board.
- On 4 February 1998, Air Luxor Flight 513, an An-12BP (LZ-SFG) leased from Air Sofia, stalled, spun down and crashed shortly after takeoff from Lajes Airport, Azores after both right side engines failed due to pilot error, killing the seven crew.
- On 11 August 1998, an Alada An-12 (D2-FAZ) ran off the runway on landing at Saurimo Airport after reportedly suffering blown landing gear tires, killing the pilot.
- On 26 August 1998, a Techaviaservice An-12BP (EW-11368) crashed 50 mi from Luanda, Angola following double engine failure, killing all 13 on board.
- On 24 October 1998, a Centrafrican Airlines An-12A (TL-ACJ) disappeared while on a Goma–Kigali cargo service with three crew on board; the crew reported that they were diverting to Kisangani; this diversion remains unexplained. The aircraft's wreckage was found in August 1999 near Lubutu, DR Congo.
- On 11 November 1998, a Viluy An-12B (RA-12955) crashed shortly after takeoff from Krasnoyarsk Airport due to possible icing, killing all 13 on board.
- On 14 December 1998, a Khors Air An-12BP (UR-11319) was shot down by UNITA forces near Kuito, Angola, resulting in the deaths of 10 passengers and crew on board.
- On 27 December 1998, an ACA-Ancargo Air An-12 (TN-AFJ) disappeared during a Luanda-Lukapa cargo flight with four on board; the aircraft was probably shot down by UNITA rebels using a SAM missile.
- On 2 February 1999, a Savanair An-12 (EY-ASS) crashed into the populous Cazenga neighbourhood of Luanda, killing all 11 people on board and another 13 people on the ground. The plane had been trying to return to the airport after suffering engine trouble.
- On 1 July 1999, a Savanair An-12B (TN-AFR) was possibly shot down by UNITA rebels and crashed at Luzamba, Angola, killing one of five crew; the four survivors were held hostage by UNITA forces.
- On 10 November 1999, an Air Force of the Democratic Republic of the Congo An-12 exploded while parked at Mbandaka Airport, killing six. The aircraft was loaded with cluster bombs.

=== 2000s ===
- On 24 March 2000, Sky Cabs Flight 702, an An-12BK (RA-11302) leased from Antey, crashed near Colombo, Sri Lanka, after multiple approach attempts in bad weather, killing six of eight crew and another three people on the ground.
- On 4 January 2001, two PLAAF Y-8s (31242 and 31243) crashed on approach to Zhangzhou Air Base, killing all 16 crew on board both aircraft. Six people on the ground also died when one of the aircraft crashed into a house; it is unknown which aircraft crashed into the house. Official reports stated that both aircraft crashed as a result of tail icing, but other reports state that the aircraft collided in mid-air.
- On 22 May 2001, Russian Air Force An-12B RA-12135 entered a spin and crashed into a swamp shortly after takeoff from Rzhev Air Base, probably due to a propeller that did not feather following engine failure; all seven crew died.
- On 27 January 2002, Angolan Air Force An-12 T-304 crashed short of the runway at Luena while attempting to land in heavy rain, killing five of 40 on board, although some reports stated a death toll of three.
- On 7 February 2002, a Volare Aviation Enterprise An-12BP (UR-LIP) struck a mountain 50 miles from Agadir in the Atlas Mountains at 9,900 feet (3,000 m), killing all eight crew.
- On 15 February 2002, a Tiramavia An-12BP (ER-ADL) crashed near Roberts International Airport after requesting an emergency landing, killing one of 10 on board.
- On 15 August 2002, Sri Lanka Air Force Y-8B CR873 crashed at Kadjuduwa Watta, Sri Lanka, during a test flight following an engine change, killing all five crew. It was reported that an engine had caught fire and separated from the aircraft.
- On 16 May 2003, Angolan Air Force An-12 T-307crashed near Menongue due to technical problems, killing all four crew.
- On 17 November 2003, Sarit Airlines Flight 044, an An-12BP (ST-SAA) crashed while on approach to Wau, South Sudan, killing all 13 on board.
- On 11 May 2004, an El Magal Aviation An-12BP (ST-SIG) crashed near Tatal, Sudan, while attempting to perform a forced landing after all four engines failed due to fuel exhaustion, killing all seven crew. The aircraft had been operating several round trips between Juba and El Obeid in the previous two days, and the aircraft was always being loaded with insufficient fuel for a round trip.
- On 5 October 2004, a Sarit Airlines An-12 (ST-SAF) crashed 43 mi from Heglig, Sudan, due to engine problems, killing all four crew.
- On 8 January 2005, a Services Air An-12 (9Q-CIH) crashed at Bukalaza, Uganda, while attempting to return to Entebbe due to engine failure and overloading, killing all six crew.
- On 25 May 2005, a Victoria Air An-12BP (9Q-CVG) lost control and crashed near Biega, DR Congo, some 30 minutes after takeoff from Goma, killing all 27 on board.
- On 4 October 2005, a Wimbi Dira Airways An-12 (9Q-CWC) landed hard at Aru Airport, causing the right main landing gear to be pushed into the cabin. All 100 passengers on board survived the landing, but two reportedly died after running into the still-rotating propellers while evacuating the aircraft.
- On 3 June 2006, a PLAAF KJ-200 'Balance Beam' AEW aircraft crashed in Guangde County in Anhui province, China, killing all 40 on board. The Chinese official explanation was that the accident was due to heavy ice formation on the wings after the aircraft made repeated passes in and out of clouds in bad weather.
- On 7 July 2006, a Mango Airlines An-12B (9Q-CVT) crashed near Sake, DR Congo, while attempting to return to Goma following engine problems, killing all six crew.
- On 29 July 2007, ATRAN Flight 9655 (an An-12BP, RA-93912) crashed shortly after takeoff from Domodedovo Airport after multiple bird strikes caused a loss of power in engines three and four, leading to loss of control, killing all seven crew.
- On 7 September 2007, a Galaxy Incorporation (leased from Transaviaservice) An-12BP (4L-SAS) crashed on landing at Goma Airport, killing all eight on board.
- On 29 September 2007, a Business and Cargo Company An-12BK (9Q-CZB) disappeared during a Kisangani–Goma cargo flight with seven on board; in November 2012, wreckage, most likely from the aircraft, was found in a forest 210 km (130 mi) south of Kisangani.
- On 26 May 2008, Moskovia Airlines Flight 9675, an An-12BP (RA-12957) crashed near Chelyabinsk due to loss of control following a possible in-flight electrical fire, killing all nine on board.
- On 27 June 2008, Juba Air Cargo Flight 500, an An-12BK (ST-ARN) en route from Khartoum to Juba struck a tree and crashed near Malakal, Sudan, following double engine failure in flight due to a thunderstorm, killing seven of eight crew.
- On November 13, 2008, British Gulf International Airlines Flight 1530, an An-12B (S9-SAO) crashed after takeoff from Al Asad Airbase in Iraq after the crew radioed that an engine was on fire, killing all seven crew.
- On 20 February 2009, an Aerolift An-12 crashed after an engine caught fire on takeoff at Luxor International Airport, in Egypt. All five crew were killed.
- On 26 August 2009, an An-12 of Aéro-Frêt (TN-AIA) crashed on approach to Maya-Maya Airport, Brazzaville, Congo. The flight had originated from Pointe Noire Airport. The five Ukrainian crew and one Congolese passenger were killed.

=== 2010s ===
- On 21 April 2010, an Almaty Aviation Antonov An-12 (UP-AN216) operated by Interisland Airlines (although initially reported to be operated by Pacific East Asia Cargo Airlines) on behalf of United Parcel Service, crashed in Barangay Laput, Mexico, Pampanga, while on approach to Clark International Airport in the Philippines following an in-flight fire. The aircraft ended up in a rice field in Pampanga, the Philippines, resulting in the deaths of three out of six crew members on board.
- On 21 March 2011, a Trans Air Congo freight flight from Brazzaville to Pointe Noire (Congo) crashed into a residential neighborhood of Mvoumvou after receiving clearance to land at Pointe Noire Airport. All four crew perished in the crash, as well as a number of persons on the ground.
- On 9 August 2011, Avis-Amur Flight 9209, an An-12AP, crashed in the Magadan region in the far east of Russia. All 11 people on board were killed. Preliminary reports indicate the pilots reported a fuel leak and an engine fire to air traffic controllers, but did not manage to return to the airport. The aircraft then crashed in a wooded area. The aircraft involved, RA-11125, was the oldest aircraft in the Russian commercial air fleet. In the wake of the accident, Russia banned operations of the An-12 pending the results of a risk assessment program.
- On 7 October 2012, an Azza Air Transport An-12BP (ST-ASA) performing flight on behalf of Sudan Air Force crashed near Khartoum while attempting an emergency landing after failure of two engines on one wing. Of 22 people on board, 15 died and seven were injured.
- On 9 August 2013, Ethiopian Air Force An-12B 1513 crashed on landing at Mogadishu Airport, killing four of six crew.
- On 26 December 2013, an Irkut Corporation An-12 (12162) crashed near Irkutsk-2 Airport, killing all nine occupants on board.
- On 4 November 2015, an Asia Airways An-12BK (EY-406) operating for Allied Services Limited crashed shortly after takeoff from Juba Airport. 41 people were killed while two people were pulled from the wreckage alive but one of them later died, leaving a baby girl as the only survivor.
- On 18 May 2016, a Silk Way Airlines An-12B (4K-AZ25) overran the runway and crashed on takeoff from FOB Dwyer Airport in southern Afghanistan, en route to Mary International Airport in Turkmenistan after the number three engine went into reverse thrust. Seven of the nine crew members on dead on board were killed in the crash.
- On 7 June 2017, Myanmar Air Force Y-8F-200W 5820 crashed 30 nautical miles (56 km) west of Dawei, Myanmar, killing all 122 on board. The aircraft was purchased in March 2016; it had 809 in-flight hours logged. The accident is the deadliest in Myanmar and is the deadliest involving the An-12 family.
- On 30 September 2017, Air Force of the Democratic Republic of the Congo An-12 EX-001 crashed shortly after take-off from Kinshasa International Airport for Bunia Airport. All eight people on board were killed.
- On 29 January 2018, People's Liberation Army Air Force Y-8GX-3 30513 crashed at Zhengchang, killing all 12 on board.
- On 4 October 2019, Ukraine Air Alliance Flight 4050, an An-12BK (UR-CAH) crashed short of the runway at Lviv Danylo Halytskyi International Airport in poor visibility due to possible fuel exhaustion, killing five of seven crew; two crew and the sole passenger are seriously injured, but survived. Ukraine revoked the airline's AOC a day after the crash, but the airline received a renewed AOC in January 2020 and restarted operations.

=== 2020s ===
- On 2 January 2020, a Sudan Air Force An-12A reportedly crashed shortly after takeoff from Geneina Airport, killing all 18 on board.
- On November 3, 2021, Grodno Aviakompania Flight 1252, an Antonov An-12BK registered EW-518TI crashed during an attempt to go-around, killing all nine people (seven crew members and two passengers) on board. This was the first fatal accident for Grodno Aviakompania.
- On 1 March 2022, a People's Liberation Army Air Force Y-8 crashed in the sea off Sanya, killing all seven crew.
- On 16 July 2022, Meridian Air Cargo Flight 3032, an Antonov An-12BK, carrying munitions from Serbia to Bangladesh, via Jordan, Saudi Arabia, and India, crashed near the city of Kavala in northern Greece, killing all eight people on board.
- On 17 November 2026, a Russian Air Force An-12BK caught fire mid-air and crashed in Kemerovo Oblast, Russia, killing all 19 on board.

== Non-fatal incidents ==
=== 1960s ===
- On 2 April 1963, an Aeroflot/Polar An-12, registration CCCP-11338, ran off the runway on takeoff from Magadan Airport; the pilot had not aligned the aircraft correctly for takeoff.
- In 1966, an Aeroflot/Polar An-12 overran the runway on takeoff from Tyumen Airport after the pilot forgot to release the parking brake before takeoff. The aircraft was taking part in Operation Truba, delivering pipes and equipment to the Tyumen region to develop oil and gas fields. The accident happened between December 1965 and February 1966.
- On 4 June 1967, an Aeroflot/Polar An-12TP-2, registration CCCP-04366, was written off after the left side landing gear collapsed while landing at Blagoveshchensk Airport.
- On 29 January 1968, an Aeroflot/Yakut An-12B, registration CCCP-11015, was written off following a hard landing at Magan Airport.
- On 25 June 1969, an Aeroflot/East Siberia An-12TB, registration CCCP-11380, was written off after the right side landing gear broke off while landing at Mirny Airport.

=== 1970s ===
- On 26 February 1970, an Aeroflot/North Caucasus An-12TB, registration CCCP-12966, crashed short of the runway at Beryozovo Airport after the crew misjudged their altitude in fog.
- On 16 February 1970, an Aeroflot/Komi An-12TB, registration CCCP-11374, overran the runway on landing at Vorkuta-2 landing strip; the aircraft was written off. The crew diverted to Vorkuta-2 due to bad weather at Vorkuta Airport.
- On 29 July 1971, an Aeroflot/International An-12B, registration CCCP-12993, crashed short of the runway at Dum Dum Airport during a PAR approach; the aircraft was written off. The pilot lost control of the aircraft after flying into heavy rain at low altitude.
- On 17 February 1973, an Aeroflot/Polar An-12BP, registration CCCP-11341, was written off following a hard landing at Amderma Airport.
- On 4 December 1974, an Aeroflot/East Siberia An-12B, registration CCCP-12985, collided with an Aeroflot/East Siberia An-2 (CCCP-49342) over Irkutsk Airport; the An-2 crashed north of the runway and caught fire, killing all 13 on board; the An-12 made an emergency landing in the floodplain of the Ushakovka River after which it slid on the ground, breaking off both left side engines and knocking down a mast that split the fuselage in two; all seven crew of the An-12 survived.
- On 15 December 1975, an Aeroflot/Yakutsk An-12B, registration CCCP-11005, was damaged during takeoff from Fergana Airport when the crew raised the landing gear too soon; although the aircraft was to be repaired at Fergana, it was too severely damaged and was written off instead.
- In December 1975, a Balkan Bulgarian Airlines An-12B, registration LZ-BAA, was written off after overrunning the runway following a hard landing at Kufrah Airport.
- In 1978, an Aeroflot/Yakutsk An-12BP, registration CCCP-11125, was written off in Russia when a container with acid broke during loading, causing internal damage and severe corrosion. The aircraft was struck off the Soviet register in 1978; the accident may have happened between 1972 and 1978.

=== 1980s ===
- On 24 April 1982, an Aeroflot/International An-12B, registration CCCP-11107, went off the runway at Novy Urengoy Airport after the crew forgot to lock the nosewheel; the aircraft struck an elevated taxiway, breaking off the landing gear. The fuel tanks ruptured and the aircraft burned out.
- On 24 August 1984, a Balkan Bulgarian Airlines An-12B, registration LZ-BAD, landed at high speed on runway 25 after a tight procedure turn while on approach to Bole Airport; the aircraft touched down too late and ran off the runway.
- On 3 May 1986, an Aeroflot/Krasnoyarsk An-12TB crashed short of the runway at Ledovaya Baza, an ice airstrip north of Graham Bell Island. The aircraft was deemed repairable and was prepared for recovery, but ten days later the aircraft fell through the ice while being towed.

=== 1990s ===
- On 27 March 1995, an Amuraviatrans An-12's (RA-13340) engine caught fire during the landing roll at Bunia Airport, Zaire (today Democratic Republic of the Congo).
- On 11 May 1998, a Tyumenaviatrans An-12B, registration RA-12973 departed Kabinda Airport, Democratic Republic of the Congo carrying 10.000 kg of cargo. The aircraft overshot the runway colliding with the raised edge of the runway in Quatro de Fevereiro Airport, Luanda, Angola.
- On 19 August 1998, a Motor Sich An-12BP, registration UR-11528 was damaged beyond economic repair in a taxiing accident at Hang Nadim Airport in Batam, Indonesia.
- On 29 September 1999, a Mandala Airlines Antonov An-12 touched down 1300 meters short of runway 36 in Pekanbaru, Indonesia and split in half.

=== 2000s ===
- On 15 August 2002, an Intercity Airways An-12BK, registration 4R-AIA operating a cargo flight landed with the nose gear retracted at Jinnah International Airport in Karachi, Pakistan.
- On 7 November 2002, Silk Way Airlines Flight 4132, using an Antonov An-12BK, registration 4K-AZ21 overshot the runway upon landing at N'Djamena International Airport in Chad. The aircraft was destroyed.
- On 11 April 2003, Russian Zapolyariye Airlines RA-12981 was on its way to deliver supplies to the floating station "The North Pole - 1/32" on Sredniy Island, but crashed 650 m short of the runway due to poor weather conditions. All six crew members and seven passengers survived, but the plane was written-off.
- On 31 March 2005, an RPS Air Freight An-12B, registration UN-11007 operating a cargo flight made a refueling stop at Mukalla, Yemen, on its way to Dubai, United Arab Emirates, carrying 7 tons of fish. The takeoff from Mukalla had to be aborted, but the plane could not be stopped on the runway. It overran by 400 meters and caught fire. The fire was quickly contained. Possible hull-loss.
- On 28 March 2006, a Phoenix Aviation An-12BK, registration EK-46741 operating a cargo flight departed from Payam International Airport in Tehran, Iran, on its way to Sharjah, United Arab Emirates, immediately after takeoff aircraft encountered a flock of birds, as a result of which engines No. 1, 3 and 4 failed. An attempt was made to return to Tehran, but an emergency landing had to be carried out some 5 km from the airport. The airplane broke up and caught fire.
- On 14 July 2006, a Sudanese Air Force An-12 crashed on landing at Geneina Airport. The UN reported that 30 tons of ammunition were removed from the aircraft.
- On 1 November 2006, a 748 Air Services An-12BP, registration 9L-LFQ, bounced several times before it suffered a nosewheel failure while landing at Lokichoggio Airport. The aircraft was on approach with an excessive rate of descent.
- On an unspecified date between July and August 2007, an An-12, registration S9-DBQ, operated by Styron Trading crashed while attempting to land at Berbera International Airport in Somaliland. The aircraft was damaged beyond repair. Its remains are located to the northwest of the runway approximately 1200 meters inward of the threshold of runway 23.
- On 15 September 2007, a Veteran Airline An-12B, registration UR-CEN caught fire on the ground at Pointe Noire Airport in Congo, probably while starting up the engines. The aircraft was heavily damaged by the fire.
- On 17 October 2007, an Imtrec Aviation An-12BP, registration XU-365, crashed in a flooded rice field 16 mi west of Pochentong Airport after the crew reported that they were having problems and were returning to the airport. One pilot reported that all four engines quit due to oil leaks.
- On 8 November 2007, Juba Air Cargo Flight 700, an An-12TB, registration ST-JUA, went off the runway on landing at Khartoum-Civil Airport; the right wing struck an electric pylon before ending up on three parked tanks, causing major damage. Although all four crew survived, two soldiers on the ground died when the aircraft burned out.
- In 2007, an An-12BP, registration S9-DBP, overran the runway at Bunia Airport after landing late. As of February 2019, the aircraft is still parked at the airport.
- On 29 September 2008, Angolan Air Force An-12BK T-311 was written off following a right side landing gear collapse at Luanda Airport.
- On 2 January 2009, a British Gulf International Airlines An-12 skidded off the runway while taking off at Sharjah International Airport. The aircraft was on a cargo flight en route to Afghanistan. The aircraft incurred a little damage. This was followed by a temporary ban on the aircraft. The ban was rescinded in April 2009, but was reinstated permanently in February 2010.

=== 2010s ===
- On 4 January 2010, El Magal Aviation Flight 100, an An-12BK (ST-AQQ), landed short of the runway at Heglig Airport, striking concrete blocks and runway lights after which the aircraft bounced, coming down nose-first. The pilot then ordered the propellers to be feathered, but the No. 4 propeller did not feather, causing asymmetrical thrust. The aircraft drifted left and left the runway, breaking off the landing gear.
- On 21 July 2010, Khabarovsk Avia Flight 9236, an An-12BK (RA-11376), went off the side of the runway on takeoff from Keperveyem Airport into a marsh, damaging the bottom of the fuselage and breaking off the landing gear before striking a barrier on the side of a helipad. The nosegear control system failed during taxi, causing the aircraft to skid to the left.
- On 28 July 2010, a contracted An-12BP (3X-GEO) landed too late and missed the runway at FOB Dwyer, Afghanistan, crashing through a safety berm. After the crash, U.S. military construction workers drained the fuel and then attempted to drag the aircraft to a clearing, but this failed and the plane was torn apart instead.
- On 19 October 2012, an Air Mark Aviation An-12B (EK12112) bounced and landed hard at Shindand Air Base, Afghanistan, breaking off the left landing gear; the aircraft went off the runway and crashed in a drainage ditch and burned out. The aircraft was contracted by the U.S. military.
- On 9 August 2013, a Ukraine Air Alliance An-12BK (UR-CAG) burned out at Leipzig Airport, Germany. The aircraft had been loaded with live chicks and was preparing for takeoff when the fire broke out in the cargo area. The crew was able to escape before the fire completely destroyed the aircraft.
- On 24 July 2014, an Air Armenia Cargo An-12BK (EK12104) returned to Yerevan Airport after the 'chips in oil' warning appeared for engine four; the aircraft suffered no damage and all six on board survived. The engine, which was 54 hours short of its end of service life, was replaced.
- On 17 July 2015, Russian Air Force An-12BK RF-94291 force-landed at Chelyabinsk Airport following triple engine failure; all 14 on board survived.
- On 25 September 2015, Ruby Star Airlines Flight 1023, an An-12, returned to Minsk-1 International Airport after one of its engines overheated. The aircraft suffered no damage and all eight crew survived.
- On 6 April 2016, Cavok Air Flight 7006, an An-12A (UR-CCP) suffered failure of engine three while descending through 3,000 m (9,800 ft); the aircraft landed at Hassi Messaoud without incident, where damage was noted to the fuselage and engine fairing. The top and side cowlings were also completely missing. All seven on board survived.
- On 13 July 2016, a Ruby Star Airlines An-12BP (EW-338TI) was blown onto a Belavia Boeing 737 (EW-283PA) during a thunderstorm at Minsk-2 International Airport.
- On 12 February 2018, Sudan Air Force An-12BK 3388 overran the runway on landing at El Geneina, Sudan; all 23 on board survived.
- On 15 March 2018, a Kosmos Airlines An-12BP 11130 suffered partial failure of the rear cargo door on takeoff from Yakutsk Airport and lost part of its cargo, $368 million in gems and precious metals. One hundred and seventy two gold ingots were collected from the runway. There were no casualties.
- On 20 March 2018, a Cavok Air An-12BK (UR-KDM) bounced three times on landing at Gao Airport, causing the nosegear to break off; all seven on board survived.
- On 26 December 2018, a Cavok Air An-12BK (UR-CBG) suffered an engine fire while parked at Mattala Rajapaksa International Airport prior to departure to Salalah, Oman; the fire was quickly extinguished and the aircraft only suffered minor damage. All eight on board survived.
- On 30 September 2019, a Cavok Air An-12BK (UR-CKL) struck a lighting stand with its left wing while taxiing at Liverpool Airport; all seven on board survived. The aircraft was repaired, returning to service on 27 December 2019.
- On 10 October 2019, Russian Air Force An-12BK RF-95428 landed wheels-up at Koltsovo Airport; all 17 on board survived.

=== 2020s ===
- On 9 February 2021, Russian Air Force An-12BK RF-95416 suffered left landing gear and nose gear failure while landing at Iturup Airport in a snowstorm; no casualties.
- On 19 June 2022, a Meridian An-12BK (UR-CIC) struck a mast of apron lights while taxiing at Rzeszów, damaging the leading edge of the right wing; no casualties.
- On 1 July 2022, Motor Sich Airlines Flight 6536, a An-12BK (UR-11316) transporting military cargo from Istanbul, landed hard at Uzhhorod Airport, blowing out three landing gear tires, after which the aircraft left the runway. All nine on board survived.
- On 22 June 2023, a Cavok Air An-12BP (UR-CEZ) tipped up onto its tail in heavy winds while parked at George Bush Intercontinental Airport. The aircraft suffered only minor damage and was back in service two days later. The airport was experiencing a severe thunderstorm at the time of the incident.
- On 11 September 2023, SibNIA Flight 9268, an An-12BK (RA-11868) overran the runway on takeoff at Magadan Airport following an aborted takeoff due to engine failure; all eight on board survived.
- On 23 January 2024, Myanmar Air Force Shaanxi Y-8F-200W 5821 skidded off the runway and split in two while landing at Lengpui Airport in Aizawl, Mizoram, India.
- On 26 March 2025, an ATRAN An-12BK (RA-11371) rolled off the runway at Novy Urengoy Airport after a landing gear failure, all eight on board survived.
- On 1 June 2025, a Russian Aerospace Forces An-12BT was destroyed after being hit by Ukrainian FPV drones during Operation Spiderweb

== See also ==
- Aviation accidents and incidents
