= Q8 =

Q8 may refer to:

- Common abbreviation for Kuwait, used due to its phonetic similarity with the country's name
- Kuwait Petroleum International, a subsidiary of Kuwait Petroleum Corporation which trades under the "Q8" brand
- Audi Q8, a mid-size luxury crossover SUV coupé
- Q8 (New York City bus)
- Quad 8, the Quadraphonic version of Stereo 8
- Q (TV series), 4th series of Spike Milligan's TV comedy sketch show
- Pacific East Asia Cargo Airlines, IATA designator
- Trans Air Congo, IATA designator
- The quaternion group Q_{8}
- Quran 8, al-ʾanfāl the 8th chapter of the Islamic Holy book

== See also ==
- 8Q (disambiguation)
