= 8Q =

8Q or 8-Q may refer to:

- 8Q, IATA code for Onur Air
- 8Q, Aircraft registration for the Maldives
- 8Q SAM, a museum for contemporary art in Singapore
- 8q, an arm of Chromosome 8 (human)
- 8Q, designation for one of the Qumran Caves
- 8Q, a model of De Havilland Canada DHC-8

== See also ==
- Q8 (disambiguation)
