= Pacific East Asia Cargo Airlines =

Cargo airline in the Philippines

IATA	ICAO	Call sign
Q8	PEC	PAC-EAST CARGO
- Founded: 9 October 1990
- Ceased operations: 30 December 2010
- Hubs: Ninoy Aquino International Airport
- Secondary hubs: Clark International Airport
- Fleet size: 2
- Destinations: 17
- Headquarters: Pasay, Philippines
- Website: www.peacairlines.com

Pacific East Asia Cargo Airlines, Inc. was a cargo airline based in Pasay, Philippines. The carrier served domestic services from the Philippines with two Boeing 727 freighter aircraft. The airline also had an agreement on selected routes flown by Air Philippines. PEAC was also an affiliate airline of TNT Airways, with PEAC operating TNT leased BAe 146 aircraft.

== History ==
On October 9, 1990, Pacific East Asia Cargo Airlines, Inc. (PEAC) was officially formed and on 20 December 1991 was granted a certificate of public convenience and necessity (CPCN) to operate scheduled international all-cargo services.

On the September 1, 1999, the airline came to a cargo agreement with local airline, Air Philippines. During 2002 the airline operated freighter flights to Hong Kong using A300F type aircraft leased from the Turkish airline, MNG Airlines, freighter flights to Taipei using a Boeing 727F and domestic freighter flights to Cebu and Clark utilizing another B727 freighter.

In the period 2007 to 2011, PEAC was the fifth largest cargo carrier in the Philippines with a market share of 3.17%, transporting 23.3 million kilograms.

But on March 19, 2010, its air operator's certificate was suspended, and eleven days later on March 30, the airline was added to the European list of banned air carriers until June 25, 2015. By the end of 2010, the company ceased operations.

== Services ==
Pacific East Asia Cargo Airlines (PEAC) served domestic and regional destinations around the Philippines and surrounding region with a fleet of 727 freighter aircraft and a variety of leased aircraft. The airline also had an agreement with domestic carrier, Air Philippines, to codeshare selected cargo operations to airports that Air Philippines operates to. During a tie-up with TNT, PEAC leased four Bae 146 aircraft from TNT Airways, at the end of the lease in 1999 the aircraft were returned to Europe. The TNT-PEAC joint-venture also considered re-locating the airline's hub from Manila's Ninoy Aquino International Airport to nearby Olongapo's Subic Bay International Airport.

In June 2006, PEAC resumed its three times weekly Angeles-Clark (Angeles City) – Taipei all-cargo services, utilizing a B727-200F freighter. This was in addition to PEAC's five times weekly service between Cebu and Angeles-Clark utilizing a B727-100 freighter with aircraft registry RPC-5353, operating since 2002.

== Former destinations ==
Pacific East Asia Cargo Airlines (PEAC) served the following Destinations (May 2008). This also included cargo flights with their Air Philippines Agreement. The Airline also offers its 727 aircraft for charter services.

=== Philippines ===
- Luzon
  - Angeles City (Clark International Airport)
  - Legazpi (Legazpi Airport)
  - Manila (Ninoy Aquino International Airport)
  - Puerto Princesa (Puerto Princesa Airport)
  - Tuguegarao (Tuguegarao Airport)
- Visayas
  - Bacolod (Bacolod–Silay International Airport)
  - Cebu (Mactan–Cebu International Airport)
  - Dumaguete (Sibulan Airport)
  - Iloilo (Iloilo International Airport)
- Mindanao
  - Cagayan de Oro (Laguindingan International Airport)
  - Davao (Francisco Bangoy International Airport)
  - General Santos (General Santos International Airport)
  - Zamboanga (Zamboanga International Airport)

=== Republic of China (Taiwan) ===
- Taipei (Taiwan Taoyuan International Airport)

=== People's Republic of China ===
- Hong Kong (Hong Kong International Airport)
- Hong Kong (Kai Tak Airport)

=== Singapore ===
- Singapore (Singapore Changi Airport)

=== South Korea ===
- Seoul (Incheon International Airport)

=== Indonesia ===
- Jakarta (Soekarno-Hatta International Airport)

== Fleet ==
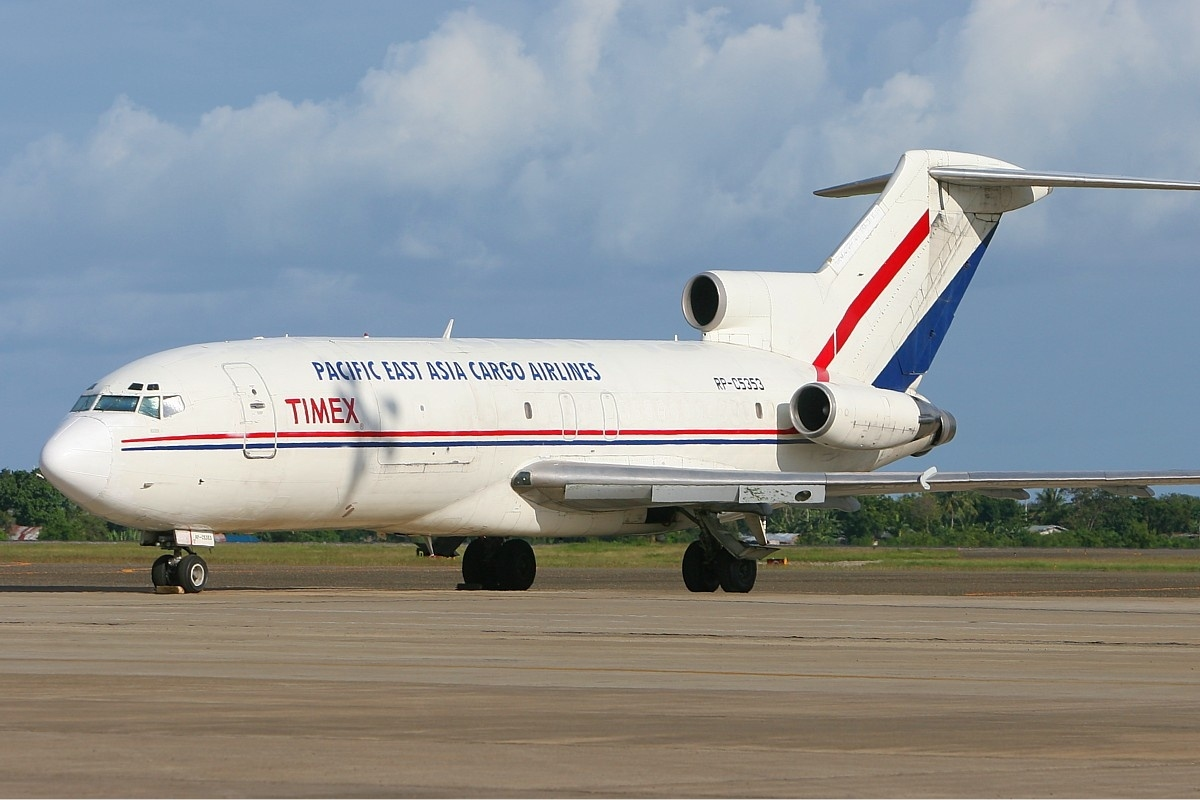
PEAC Boeing 727-100F in 2006

Pacific East Asia Cargo fleet
Aircraft	In Service	Origin	Notes
Boeing 727F	727-100F: 0; 727-200F: 0	United States	
McDonnell Douglas DC-8-71F	0 (2 on leased from BAX Global)	United States	
Boeing 747-200F	0 (1 operated for Veteran Avia)	United States	
Boeing 747-400F	0 (2 leased from Atlas Air)	United States	
Antonov An-12	0 (1 leased from ATRAN)	Soviet Union	
Antonov An-26	0 (2 on leased from Aerogaviota)	Soviet Union	
Antonov An-30	0 (1 on lease from Polet Flight)	Soviet Union	
Ilyushin Il-76T	0 (1 on leased from Abakan-Avia)	Soviet Union	
Airbus A300-600F	0 (2 on leased from FedEx Express)	France	
Saab 340B	0 (1 leased for IBC Airways)	Sweden	
Shaanxi Y-8F-300	0 (13 on order)	China	
Indonesian Aerospace CN-235-220	0 (6 on order)	Indonesia	
Antonov An-32	0 (3 on order)	Ukraine	
Antonov An-72AT	0 (27 on order)	Ukraine/Philippines	To be fitted with winglet upgraded by PADC
Ilyushin Il-96-400T	0 (6 on order)	Russia	
Boeing 767-300F	0 (3 on order)	United States	fitted with blended winglets
Airbus A330-200F	0 (3 on order)	France	
Boeing 747-8F	0 (4 on order)	United States	
Total	0 in service (10+ on order)		

(not including Boeing 737 Cargo flights operated on behalf of Air Philippines)

=== Former ===
- 4 Bae 146 (Lease from TNT Airways)
- 1 Airbus A300F
- 1 Boeing 737-200F

== Accidents and incidents ==
- On 21 April 2010, Flight 7815, an Antonov An-12 with registration UP-AN216, crashed on approach to Clark International Airport, Philippines, after a fire broke out in flight. It was initially reported to be operated by PEAC but was operated actually by Interisland Airlines.
