= Cavok Air =

Ukrainian airline

- A Cavok Air Antonov An-12B
IATA	ICAO	Call sign
-	CVK	CargoLine
- Founded: 2011
- Commenced operations: April 26, 2012
- Fleet size: 7
- Destinations: charter
- Headquarters: Kyiv, Ukraine
- Website: cavok.aero

Cavok Air or Cavok Airlines is a Ukrainian cargo airline based in Kyiv.

== History ==
The airline was established in 2011 and started operations on 26 April 2012, following the receipt of an air operator's certificate from the State Aviation Administration of Ukraine.

In December 2016, Cavok Air was granted permission from the Ukrainian Cabinet of Ministers to transport military equipment abroad.

In January 2024, Cavok Air transported a shipment of VHS-2 rifles for the Kosovo Police from Zagreb to Pristina.

On 28 March 2025, Cavok Air retired the An-12BK UR-CNN, performing a ceremonial farewell at Piešťany Airport in Slovakia. The aircraft, built in 1967 had completed 58 years in service with various airlines.

In April 2025, Cavok Air was caught up in a political row in Ghana after the opposition MP Reverend John Fordjour alleged that two aircraft that had landed at Accra International Airport a month earlier had been carrying contraband in the form of cocaine, gold and cash; the first being a Cavok Air Antonov An-12 and the second being an AirMed Hawker 800XP jet. Ghanan President John Mahama led the Narcotics Control Commission (NACOC) and CID to investigate, while communications minister Felix Ofosu accused Fordjour of spreading falsehoods. Ofosu stated that a search conducted on the Antonov aircraft revealed only drilling equipment and oil storage containers. The NACOC urged Fordjour to cooperate with investigators, but he claimed that operatives tried to arrest him at his home, but were resisted by party followers. The issue became highlight politicised, with supporters of the opposition New Patriotic Party supporting the investigation while those siding with the ruling National Democratic Congress dismissed the allegations.

In January 2026, the airline transported the Aston Martin AMR26 Formula One car for its shakedown and test at the Bahrain International Curcuit. The aircraft was tracked on Flightradar24 by a large number of Formula 1 fans.

In April 2026, Cavok Air was the subject of a regulatory dispute in Guam after the Federal Emergency Management Agency attempted to contract the Ukrainian airline to operate cargo charters between Guam and Saipan. Similar flights had been previously operated by Ukraine Air Alliance using An-12 aircraft in 2023. Carriers based in the United States, including Asia Pacific Airlines, Atlas Air and airlines of the Air Transport Services Group objected to the move, arguing that the federal government should not contract foreign air operators when domestic carriers had the capability to perform flights. Following the pushback, Cavok Air withdrew its application in May 2026.

== Fleet ==
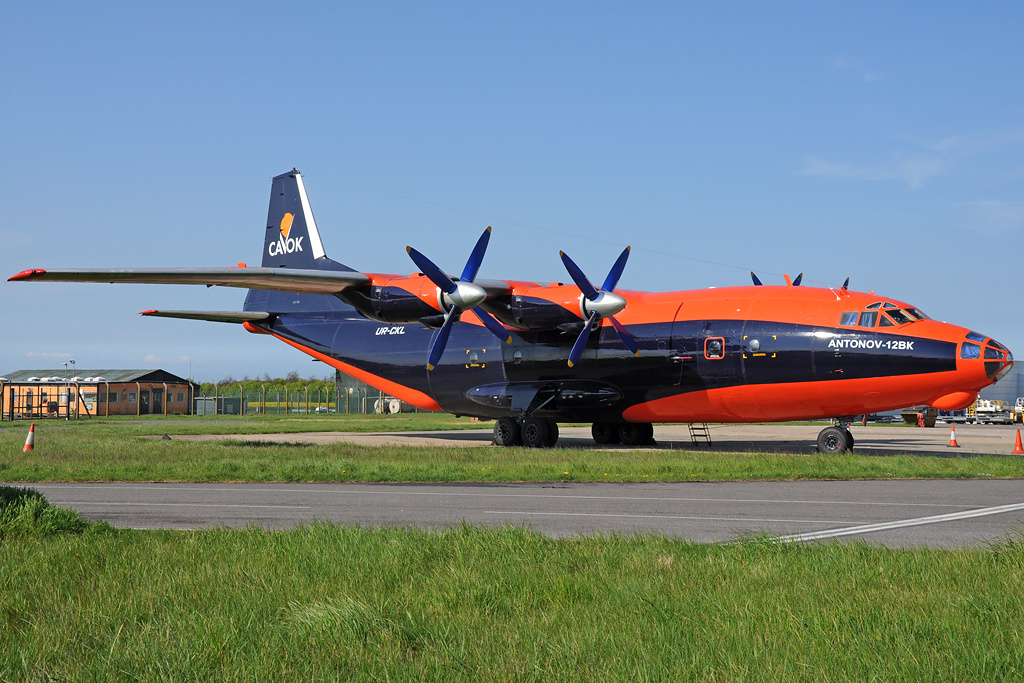
Cavok Air Antonov An-12B

As of May 2025, Cavok Air operates the following aircraft:

Aircraft	In service	Orders	Notes
Antonov An-12B	7	—	1 aircraft retired in 2025.
Total	7		

== Accidents and incidents ==
- On 6 April 2016, Flight 7006, an An-12A (UR-CCP) suffered failure of engine three while descending through 3,000 m (9,800 ft); the aircraft landed at Hassi Messaoud without incident, where damage was noted to the fuselage and engine fairing. The top and side cowlings were also completely missing. All seven on board survived.
- On 29 July 2017, Antonov An-74TK-100 UR-CKC crashed on take-off from São Tomé International Airport and was damaged beyond repair. A bird strike was reported and the aircraft overran the end of the runway whilst attempting to abort the takeoff.
- On 30 March 2018, An-12BK UR-KDM bounced three times on landing at Gao Airport, causing the nosegear to break off; all seven on board survived.
- On 26 December 2018, An-12BK UR-CBG suffered an engine fire while parked at Mattala Rajapaksa International Airport prior to departure to Salalah, Oman; the fire was quickly extinguished and the aircraft only suffered minor damage. All eight on board survived.
- On 30 September 2019, An-12BK UR-CKL struck a lighting stand with its left wing while taxiing at Liverpool Airport; all seven on board survived. The aircraft was repaired, returning to service on 27 December 2019.
- On 22 June 2023, An-12BP UR-CEZ tipped up onto its tail in heavy winds while parked at George Bush Intercontinental Airport. The aircraft suffered only minor damage and was back in service two days later. The airport was experiencing a severe thunderstorm at the time of the incident.
- On 11 December 2024, An-12BP UR-CKM returned to Malaga following a decrease in hydraulic fluid pressure.
- On 18 April 2025, Flight 7080, operated by An-12BP UR-CBG, returned to Tenerife following pressurization failure and landed safely. An actuator for the cabin air supply valve did not function when the switch on the co-pilot's panel was set to open. Replacing the switch corrected the problem, and the aircraft returned to service.
- On 26 August 2025, An-12BP UR-CEZ failed to pressurize after taking off from Ostend bound for Ankara. The crew declared an emergency and squawked code 7700 before returning to Ostend 11 minutes after takeoff.
- On 14 May 2026, An-12BP UR-CKM was detained by the Airports Authority of Trinidad and Tobago at Piarco International Airport after several tons of undeclared explosives were found on board. Two pilots as well as six crew members were also detained. The aircraft had departed George Bush Intercontinental Airport, bound for Libya via Nassau, Port of Spain and Cape Verde. Despite the initial alarm raised by state officials, following approval from local authorities, the aircraft was released and continued on its journey the next day.
