= LOT Polish Airlines Flight 6883 =

1977 aviation accident in Lebanon

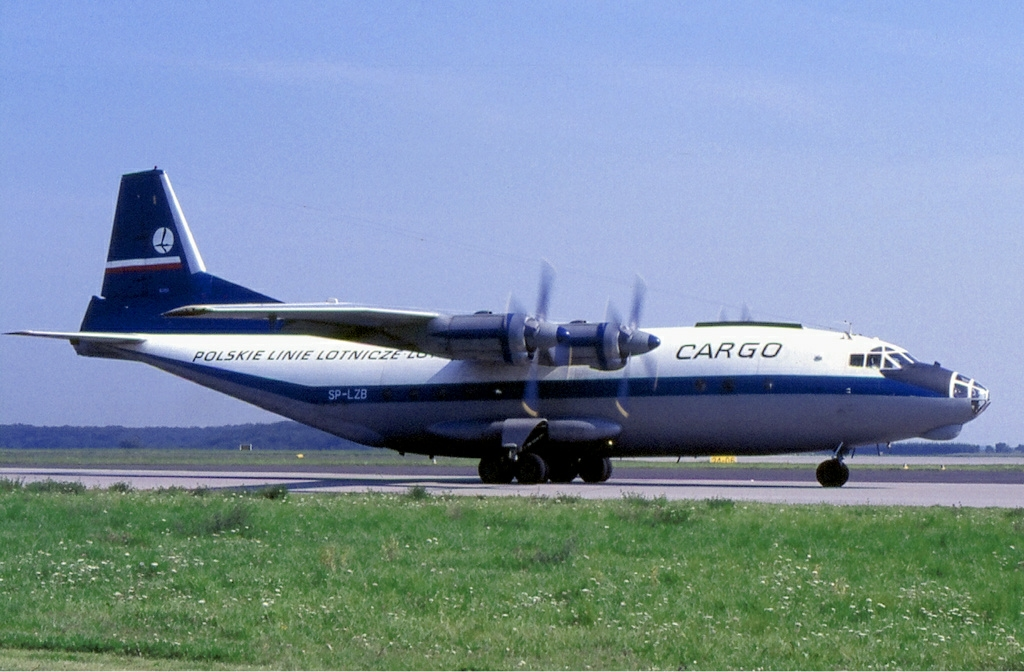
- A LOT Polish Airlines Antonov An-12, similar to the aircraft involved

Accident
- Date: 13 May 1977
- Summary: Controlled flight into terrain, cause unknown
- Site: Mount Douair near Aramoun, Lebanon

Aircraft
- Aircraft type: Antonov An-12BP
- Operator: LOT Polish Airlines
- IATA flight No.: LO 6833
- ICAO flight No.: LOT 6833
- Registration: SP-LZA
- Flight origin: Warsaw Chopin Airport, Warsaw, Poland
- Stopover: Varna International Airport, Varna, Bulgaria
- Destination: Beirut International Airport, Beirut, Lebanon
- Occupants: 9
- Crew: 9
- Fatalities: 9
- Survivors: 0

LOT Polish Airlines Flight 6883 was a scheduled cargo flight from Warsaw, Poland to Beirut, Lebanon with a stopover in Varna, Bulgaria. On 13 May 1977, the aircraft operating the flight crashed into terrain near Aramoun, Lebanon, while attempting to land at Beirut International Airport in poor weather conditions. All nine crew members on board were killed.

== Background ==
=== Aircraft ===
The aircraft involved was an Antonov An-12BP registered as SP-LZA, delivered to LOT Polish Airlines in 1966, flying with the company from June to July 1967 and again from August 1976 until the accident flight. It was powered by four Ivchenko AI-20M engines. The aircraft was leased by LOT Polish Airlines from Poland's 13th Transport Aviation Regiment. The aircraft was operated by military pilots in civilian uniforms. This facilitated the passage of the aircraft over countries that barred military aircraft from using their airspace. The cargo onboard consisted of food, industrial products, medicine, and weapons.

=== Crew members ===
The crew consisted of captain Henryk Bajer who had accumulated a total of 6,200 flight hours.

The first officer, Tadeusz Florek, had accumulated a total of 5,800 flight hours.

The remaining crew members which included flight navigator Jan Kowalik, Jerzy Grzywalski, Adam Rybak, Janusz Lech, Kazimierz Krupa and two unidentified crew members had between 3,000 - 5,500 flight hours.

== Accident ==
The flight departed from Varna Airport at 05:30 AM local time. On approach to Beirut Airport, the crew asked for clearance to land on runway 21 and a request to descend to 1,500 feet. Moments later, the aircraft struck power lines, trees, and stone terraces at 2,100 feet before crashing into Mount Douair near Aramoun, Lebanon, 8 kilometers southeast of Beirut Airport at 08:45 AM local time. All 9 occupants onboard were killed.

== Investigation ==
The investigation proposed that the most probable cause of the crash was difficulty by the crew in interpreting the messages transmitted by air traffic control, possibly due to a language barrier. It was found that the controller had to repeat his instructions to the crew while on approach twice for them to understand but the crew failed to acknowledge them.

Disputes from various agencies debated about the cause of the crash due to having no records of the crash and were assumed locked away, labelled as "TOP SECRET" (due to Poland being under socialist ideologies in 1977 until 1991). It was first thought that the weather had something to do with the crash, however, examination of the photos in the documents recovered showed that weather was not a cause of the crash.

In 1977, Lebanon was ravaged by war, and many feared that the aircraft had been shot down. Also, the plane was carrying cargo that included weapons, which hinted at political unrest between Poland and Lebanon and the Lebanese thought the plane was a threat and about to attack. Two weeks earlier, while taking off from Beirut, the aircraft had been shot at, causing in damage to the airframe.

The investigation team was not able to definitively determine the cause of the crash due to the documents being locked away, even after the fall of the Soviet Union in 1991. The crash remains unsolved to this day.
