= Aramoun =

Aramoun could refer to the following places in Lebanon.

- Aramoun, Aley, a village in Aley District, Mount Lebanon Governorate
- Aramoun, Keserwan, a village in Keserwan District, Mount Lebanon Governorate
