= Juba Air Cargo =

IATA	ICAO	Call sign
-	JUC	JUBACARGO
- Founded: 1996
- Ceased operations: 2008
- Hubs: Khartoum International Airport
- Headquarters: Khartoum, Sudan

Juba Air Cargo was a cargo airline based in Khartoum, Sudan. It was established in 1996 and operated domestic cargo services. Its main base was at Khartoum International Airport. In 2008 the airline ceased all operations.

== History ==
The airline has been operating since 1997 from its Khartoum base and another in Sharjah and is headed by Bahaa Amin Akaska. Organised in 2000 as a member of the JAMA Group alliance with Attico, Airwest and Marsland.

== Services ==
Juba Air Cargo operated cargo services to the following destinations: Khartoum, Juba, Waw and Malakal.

== Accidents ==
- On 8 November 2007 Juba Air Cargo lost the aircraft ST-JUA in an accident at Khartoum International Airport. The An-12 cargo plane took off from Khartoum (KRT) around 08:00 in the morning, carrying 11 tons of cargo. One engine failed shortly after takeoff, according to the president of Juba Air Cargo, due to bird strike. The airplane returned to land, but crash-landed on the military part of the airport. 2 soldiers were killed on the ground. The airplane caught fire but the 4 crew members, 3 Russians and a Sudanese escaped.
- On June 27, 2008, a cargo plane crashed mid-flight, killing 7 crew members, including 5 foreigners. Civil Aviation Authority spokesman Abdel Hafiz told AFP that the Juba Cargo company plane crashed an hour and 10 minutes after takeoff from Khartoum, bound for the Juba—capital of South Sudan, apparently owing to bad weather.

"One person survived out of eight (crew members), a Sudanese. Two Sudanese were among the dead (along with) four from Ukraine and one from Armenia,"

The plane took off at 5:55 am (0255 GMT) and came down north of Malakal, the capital of Upper Nile State.

"A thunderstorm hit the plane, as the survivor said. This apparently is the cause. The survivor is not injured, but was taken to hospital (for a check-up).

The dead were evacuated and flown back to a Khartoum hospital morgue, where police told bereaved relatives that they could not claim the bodies until Saturday, said an AFP photographer.

The Sudan Media Centre (SMC) website, which is considered close to the intelligence services, said the Antonov 12 had only recently returned to Sudan after undergoing major maintenance in the United Arab Emirates.

It confirmed that one Armenian, four Ukrainians, the Sudanese pilot and another Sudanese were killed, and quoted the survivor—an air operations officer—as saying that the plane was hit twice by lightning.

An hour and 10 minutes after takeoff, the pilot contacted the control tower of Khartoum airport and requested permission to fly at a lower altitude because of poor weather conditions, but then suddenly communication was lost, SMC said.

== Fleet ==
As of June 28, 2008, the Juba Air Cargo fleet became zero after the crash of its last remaining AN-12.

=== Previously operated ===
In August 2006 the airline also operated:

- 1 Ilyushin Il-76TD
