= Interisland Airlines =

Air charter company of the Philippines

IATA	ICAO	Call sign
I4	ISN	TRI-BIRD
- Founded: October 10, 1986 (as Interisland Air Services)
- Commenced operations: October 10, 1986 (as Interisland Air Services); 2002 (as Interisland Airlines)
- Ceased operations: May 15, 2017
- Hubs: Ninoy Aquino International Airport
- Fleet size: 6
- Destinations: 5 (at the time of closure)
- Parent company: Interisland Resorts & Services, Inc.
- Headquarters: Ninoy Aquino International Airport; Pasay, Philippines
- Website: http://interislandairlines.com/ (defunct)

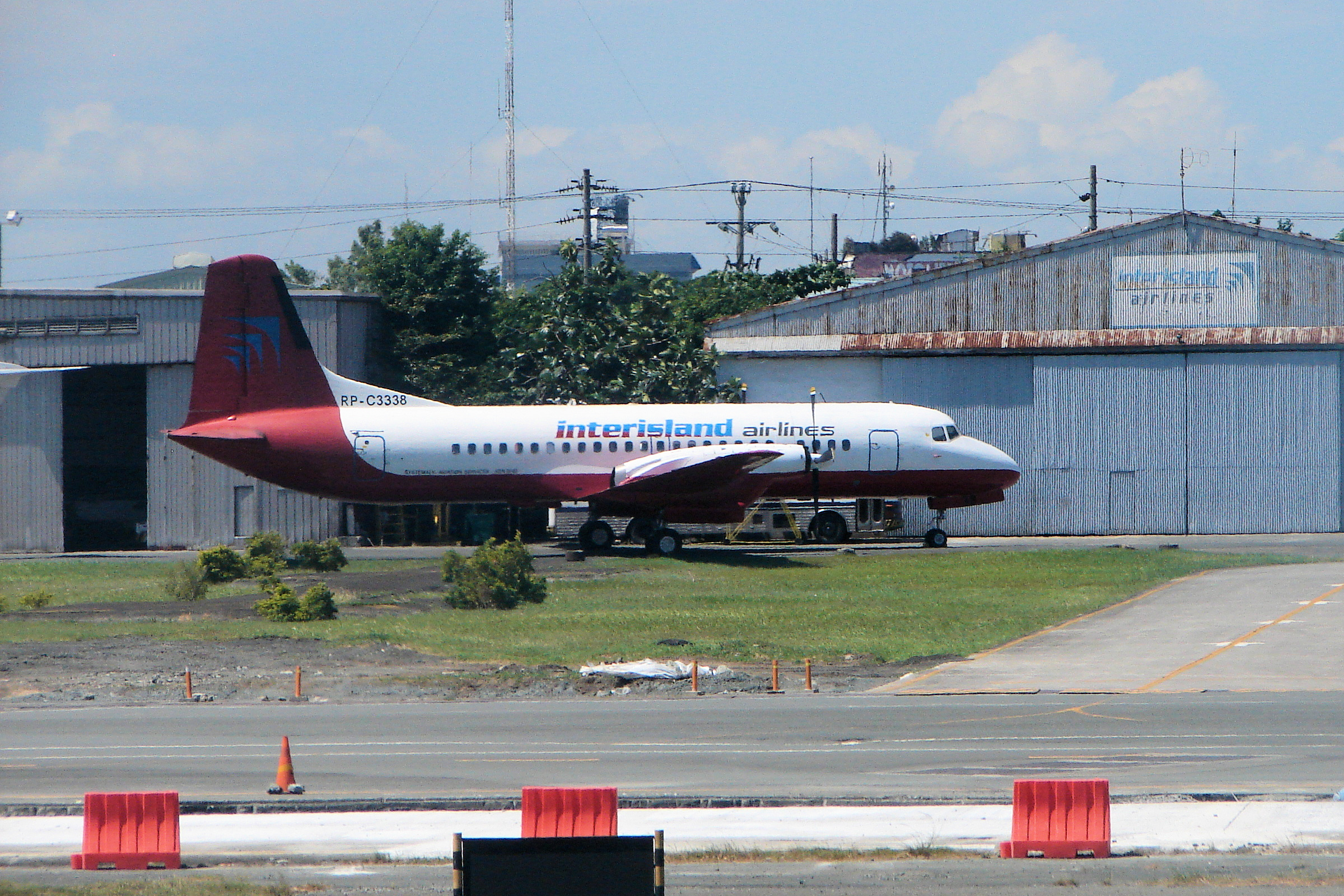
NAMC YS-11 of Interisland Airlines at Ninoy Aquino International Airport

Interisland Airlines was a Filipino air charter company, headquartered in Ninoy Aquino International Airport in Pasay, Manila, Philippines. It was a subsidiary of Interisland Resorts & Services, Inc. and it provided domestic, as well as international charter services carrying passengers and cargo.

== History ==
Interisland Airlines was founded in 1986 as Interisland Air Services Incorporated. The airline was founded by Luke and Consuelo Helgen. Soon after, other people joined the company from Interisland Resorts & Services Incorporated: Lydia Dizon acting as Chief Financial Officer (CFO), Gloria Belen acting as Trustee, and Marcelo Rivera as the Chief Operating Officer. The airline started as charter services company with 2 Bell 206 Helicopters, both Long Ranger and Jetranger, and 4 private jets from Aero Commander, Cessna, Dassault, Bell & Pilatus Aircraft.

In 2004, the airline acquired two YAK-40 aircraft and sold their helicopters. As a result, they rebranded to the current name Interisland Airlines in December.

On March 30, 2010, the airline was added to the European list of banned air carriers. A month later on April 23, its air operator's certificate was revoked following a fatal accident involving an Antonov An-12 that had occurred two days earlier.

As of May 2017, the company closed its operations and its official Facebook page are still available.

== Destinations ==
=== Philippines ===
As of June 2016, Interisland Airlines serves six destinations at the time of closure in 2017.

- Manila - Ninoy Aquino International Airport (hub)
- Vigan - Vigan Airport
- Boracay - Boracay Airport
- Kalibo - Kalibo International Airport
- Sibuyan - Sibuyan Airport (terminated)
- Caticlan - Caticlan Airport
- Busuanga - Busuanga Airport (terminated)

=== Indonesia ===
- Biak - Frans Kaisiepo Airport (terminated)

== Fleet ==
When Interisland airlines ceased operations in 2017, this was their final fleet.

- Yakovlev 42D
- Yakovlev 40
- Antonov 12BP
- Dornier Do 28
- Let L-410
- NAMC YS-11
- Antonov An-26

== Accidents and incidents ==
- On 19 July 2005, a Yakovlev Yak-40 was damaged beyond repair when it touched down short of the runway at Godofredo P. Ramos Airport after a flight from Ninoy Aquino International Airport. There were no injuries.
- On 2 November 2006, another Yakovlev Yak-40 was damaged beyond repair when its left main gear tire burst while landing at Godofredo P. Ramos Airport and it swerved off the runway. There were no injuries.
- On 21 April 2010, an Antonov An-12BP cargo aircraft, leased from Almaty Aviation and flying from Mactan–Cebu International Airport to Clark International Airport, crashed near Mexico, Pampanga, killing three of the six persons on board. Prior to crashing, flight control had received an emergency call regarding an on-board fire. Upon impact, the aircraft broke in two and burst into flames.
