= Rzhev Air Base =

Russian Air Force in Tver Oblast, Russia

Rzhev Rzhev-3
- Ржев-3
- Rzhev, Tver Oblast in Russia
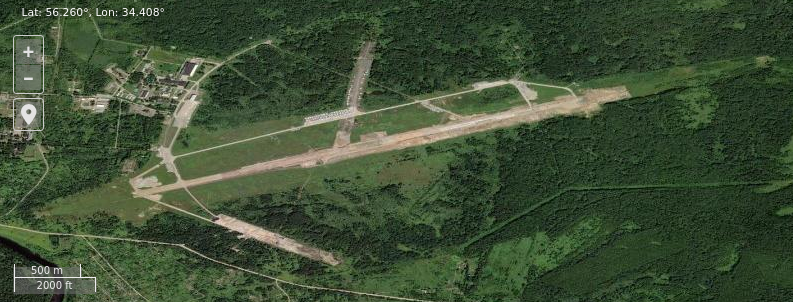
- Satellite imagery of Rzhev air base

Site information
- Type: Air Base
- Owner: Ministry of Defence
- Operator: Russian Air Force

Location
- Shown within Tver Oblast Rzhev (Russia)
- Coordinates: 56°15′36″N 34°24′30″E

Site history
- Built: 1950
- In use: 1950 - present

Airfield information
- Elevation: 194 metres (636 ft) AMSL
Runways
Direction	Length and surface
06/24	2,500 metres (8,202 ft) Concrete

Rzhev (Russian: Ржев) (also given as Ryev, Rzev, Rjzev) is an air base of the Russian Air Force in Tver Oblast, Russia located 5 km east of Rzhev. It was a Tupolev Tu-128 (ASCC: Fiddler) depot airfield during the Cold War, operated by BKhAT (Aviation Equipment Storage Base).

The airfield also had an interceptor role with the 23rd Fighter Aviation Regiment (23 IAP PVO) between 1950 and 1980. The 23 IAP initially operated the Sukhoi Su-9 (ASCC: Fishpot) in the 1960s. It was named for "Fifty Years of the Soviet Union" in 1972. The regiment ceased using the Su-9 in 1979 or 1980 and was then disbanded in 1980. (It should not be confused with a 23rd IAP that was formed in 2000 by the merging of 60 and 404 IAPs later at Dzyomgi Airport in the Russian Far East.) The base was also used by the 445th Fighter Aviation Regiment between 1951 and 1961 with the Mikoyan-Gurevich MiG-17 (ASCC: Fresco).

In 1966 the 1082nd Aviation Repair Base became the 514th Aviation Repair Plant.

When the airfield was imaged in 1981, US analysts observed 102 Su-9 aircraft in storage and noted the south dispersal area had become a regional storage facility for the type. The storage base, seemingly V/Ch 03532, was reportedly disbanded in 1980 Other similar designations included the 4044 Aviation Base and the 4884 BRS (Base for Reserve Aircraft).

The base is still home to the 514th Aviation Repair Plant.

As of August 2025 Google Maps shows the main runway to be unusable due to apparent construction work.

== See also ==
- List of military airbases in Russia
