= Almaty Aviation =

Airline of Kazakhstan

IATA	ICAO	Call sign
6T	LMT	ALMATY
- Founded: 2002
- Ceased operations: 2010
- Hubs: Almaty International Airport
- Fleet size: 3
- Headquarters: Almaty, Kazakhstan
- Website: http://en.alaport.com/business/almatyaviation/

Almaty Aviation was a cargo airline based in Almaty, Kazakhstan. Its base of operations is Almaty International Airport. The airline operates cargo services throughout Kazakhstan and the CIS.

== Fleet ==
- 3 Antonov An-12
