= Zapolyariye =

Russian airline

IATA	ICAO	Call sign
—	PZY	ZAPOLOYAR
- Founded: 2007
- Ceased operations: 2010
- Hubs: Alykel Airport, Norilsk
- Fleet size: 4
- Destinations: Krasnodar, Khabarovsk, Novokuznetsk, Anapa
- Headquarters: Krasnoyarsk, Russia

Zapolyariye (Russian Авиапредприятие Зональное) is a defunct Russian airline which was founded in 2007 and based in Norilsk, Keasnoyarsk. It ceased business in 2010 with money owed to staff due to large losses (over 150,000,000 Roubles as of September 2010) and the management's inability to finance the airline.

== Routes ==
The airline formerly operated the following routes:

- Krasnodar - Khabarovsk - Novokuznetsk (НЛ-511)
- Khabarovsk - Novokuznetsk - Anapa (НЛ-414)
- Anapa - Novokuznetsk (НЛ-369)

The airline carried out 688 flights on the above routes in Summer 2010 with 177 delayed

== Fleet ==
Aircraft	In fleet	Seats	Notes
Tupolev TU-154M	4		
