= Ukraine Air Alliance Flight 4050 =

2019 aviation accident

Coordinates: 49°47′29″N 23°59′8″E

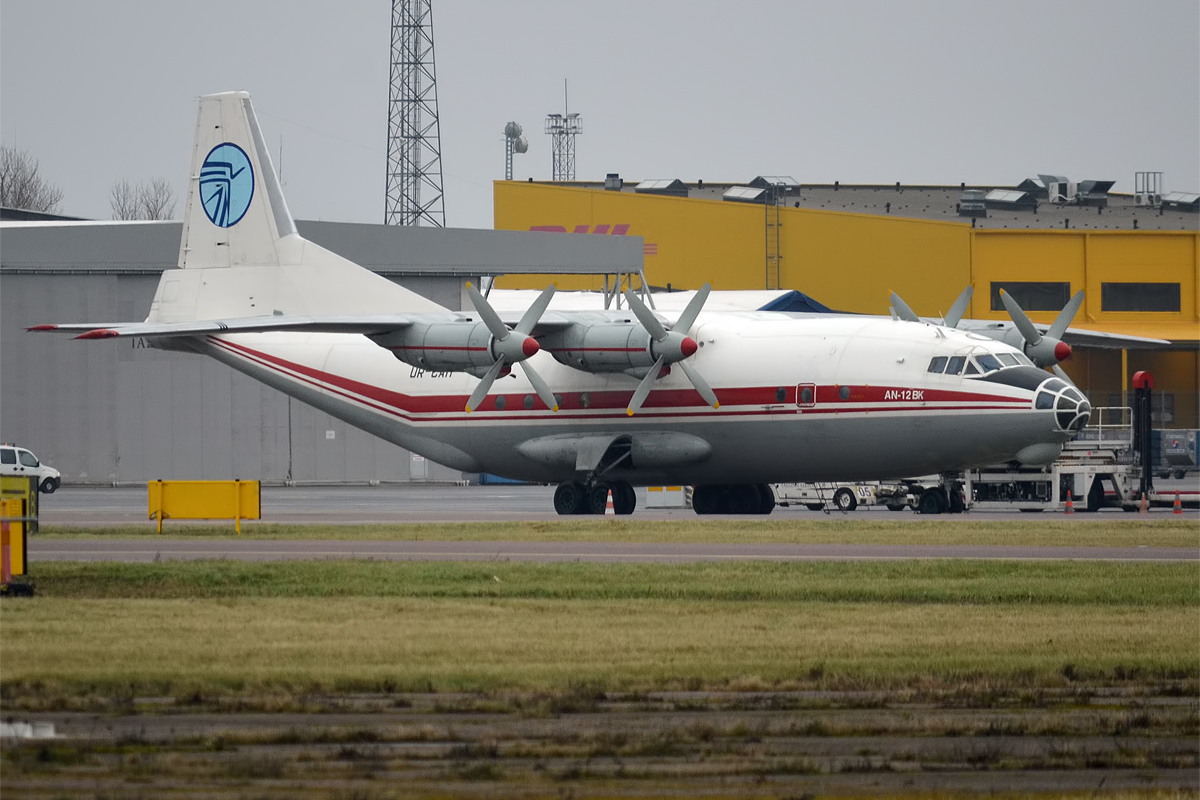
- UR-CAH, aircraft involved, seen in 2015

Accident
- Date: 4 October 2019
- Summary: Pilot error due to pilot fatigue; Bad weather
- Site: 1.5 kilometer before the runway in Lviv, Ukraine

Aircraft
- Aircraft type: Antonov An-12BK
- Operator: Ukraine Air Alliance
- ICAO flight No.: UKL4050
- Registration: UR-CAH
- Flight origin: Vigo-Peinador Airport, Vigo, Spain
- Stopover: Lviv International Airport, Lviv, Ukraine
- Destination: Istanbul Airport, Istanbul, Turkey
- Passengers: 1
- Crew: 7
- Fatalities: 5
- Injuries: 3 (serious)
- Survivors: 3

On 4 October 2019, Ukraine Air Alliance Flight 4050 crashed due to fuel exhaustion on approach to Lviv International Airport, during a flight from Vigo, Spain to Istanbul, Turkey via Lviv, Ukraine, killing five people, and three people were seriously injured. The aircraft was an Antonov An-12.

== Aircraft ==
The accident aircraft was an Antonov An-12 cargo aircraft, powered by four turboprop engines, registered as UR-CAH and built in 1968 with manufacturer serial number 8345064.

== Accident ==
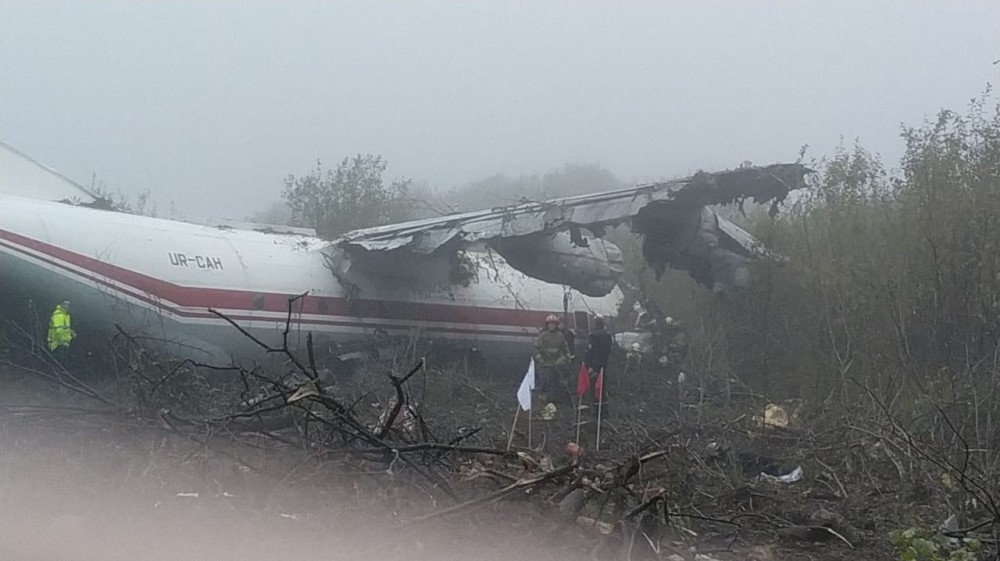
The wreckage of the Antonov An-12 at the crash site.

The aircraft departed Vigo-Peinador Airport in Spain, bound for Istanbul Airport in Turkey, with eight people aboard, seven crew and one passenger, which was a cargo escort. Flight 4050 was a cargo flight, carrying 10 t (10 long tons; 11 short tons) of cargo, with the intention to stop-over on Lviv International Airport, in Ukraine for refueling, before continuing to Istanbul.

The aircraft was approaching Runway 31, on heading 310, in difficult weather conditions; although there was little wind, vertical visibility was only 60 metres (197 ft), while visibility near the ground was 250 metres (820 ft) and Runway Visual Range (RVR) was 800 metres (2,625 ft).

The crew declared an emergency and started to perform an emergency landing, but failed to reach the runway. The aircraft impacted the ground at 7:10 a.m. just 1.5 kilometres (0.93 mi; 0.81 nmi) before the Runway 31 threshold, close to the village of Sokilnyky. The cockpit section broke off on impact, then the cargo shifted, crushing and killing five occupants.

== Emergency response ==
At 7:29 a.m. the crew member called and reported the aircraft performed an emergency landing. At 7:40 a.m. the wreckage of the aircraft was located 1.5 kilometres (0.93 mi; 0.81 nmi) from Runway 31. By 9:00 a.m. it was determined there were eight people aboard. Three of them were found seriously injured and they were taken to the hospital. Three bodies were also found, while two were still missing. Later two missing bodies were found, all dead. It was finally determined five people perished in the crash, at least four of them were crew, and the sole passenger, a cargo escort.

== Response ==
Data from:'

=== Ukraine's ministry of infrastructure ===
Initially it was reported that there were three crew and one passenger, all four killed, but it was eventually corrected by the ministry. The ministry also confirmed that the aircraft was carrying ten tons of cargo.

=== Lviv's mayor ===
Lviv's mayor noted that the aircraft performed the emergency landing due to fuel exhaustion.

== Investigation ==
The National Bureau of Air Accidents Investigation of Ukraine (NBAAI) opened officially investigation of the accident on 9 October, four days after the crash. The on-site work of the commission took place between October 5 and 7. In this action two black boxes were recovered and were in good condition and able to provide data. The other information, such as air traffic control communication, radar data, weather information, emergency service response and ground based navigation aids at the airport were also collected.

The final report was published by NBAAI on 8 October 2021 concluding that the probable cause was, "the most probable cause of the accident, collision of a serviceable aircraft with the ground during the landing approach in a dense fog, was the crew’s failure to perform the flight in the instrument conditions due to the probable physical excessive fatigue, which led to an unconscious descent of the aircraft below the glide path and ground impact."

== Aftermath ==
The day after the crash Ukraine Air Alliance was banned from operating flights in European Union airspace. On 7 October 2019, State Aviation Administration of Ukraine announced that air operator's certificate of Ukraine Air Alliance was terminated effective 5 October 2019, 00:00 UTC after an accident.

== See also ==
- Tuninter Flight 1153, ditching due to fuel exhaustion
- Avianca Flight 52
- List of accidents and incidents involving commercial aircraft
