= ATRAN Flight 9655 =

2007 aviation accident in Russia

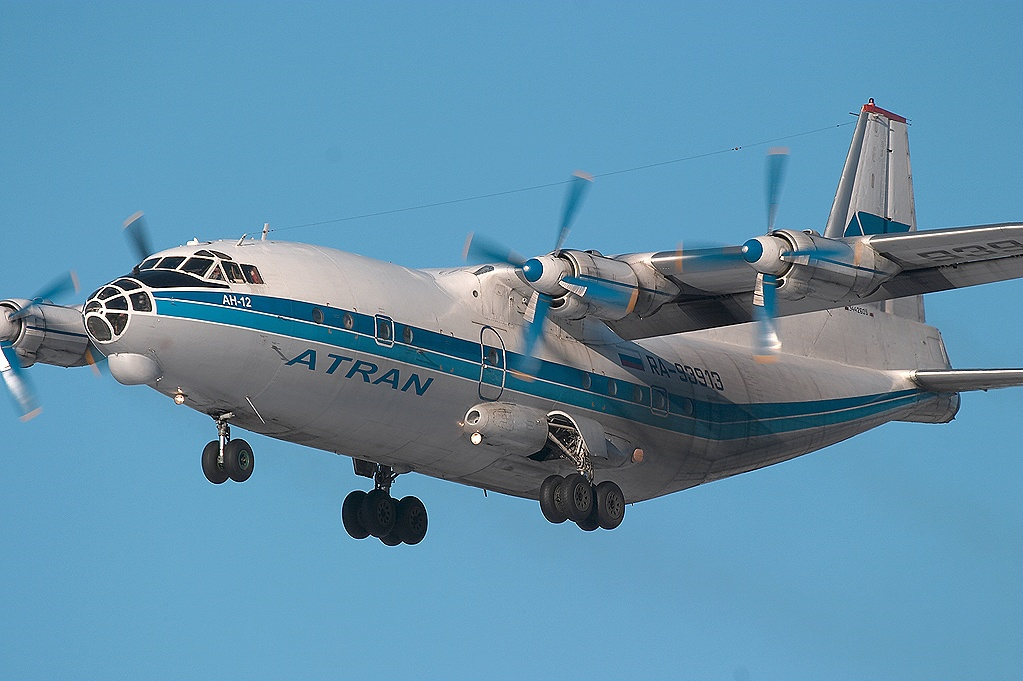
- RA-93913, sister ship to the aircraft involved

Accident
- Date: 29 July 2007
- Summary: Loss of control due to bird strike
- Site: 4 km away from Moscow Domodedovo Airport, Russia

Aircraft
- Aircraft type: Antonov An-12WR
- Operator: ATRAN
- IATA flight No.: V89655
- ICAO flight No.: VAS9655
- Call sign: ATRAN 9655
- Registration: RA-93912
- Flight origin: Moscow Domodedovo Airport, Russia
- 1st stopover: Omsk Central Airport, Russia
- 2nd stopover: Bratsk Airport, Russia
- Destination: Komsomolsk-on-Amur Airport, Russia
- Occupants: 7
- Passengers: 1
- Crew: 6
- Fatalities: 7
- Survivors: 0

ATRAN Flight 9655 was a scheduled cargo flight from Moscow, Russia to Komsomolsk-on-Amur, Russia with stopovers in Omsk, Russia and Bratsk, Russia. On 29 July 2007, the aircraft operating the flight struck birds shortly after takeoff, damaging two of the four engines. The aircraft then banked to the right and entered an irrecoverable dive, crashing four kilometers from the end of the runway. All 7 crew members on board were killed.

== Background ==
=== Aircraft ===
The aircraft involved was an Antonov An-12 produced on January 31, 1964. On May 24, 1994, it was purchased to ATRAN and was leased to Miras Air from 2004 to 2006.

=== Victims ===
- Captain - Zolotov Igor Petrovich
- Co-pilot - Chernyshev Sergey Viktorovich
- Navigator - Korobkov Yuri Vasilievich
- Flight mechanic - Polyakov Sergey Ivanovich
- Radio operator - Komaristy Roman Andreevich
- Flight Operator - Usachev Evgeniy Aleksandrovich
- Passenger - Sorokin Sergey Stepanovich

== Accident ==
The flight was a cargo flight, delivering various aircraft components for assembly at the Gagarin Aircraft Manufacturing Plant in Komsomolsk. The aircraft took off from runway 32C at approximately 04:17 AM local time. Shortly after takeoff, at a height of 164 feet above the ground, the plane experienced an engine surge in the number 4 engine, followed by a surge in the number 3 engine. Both engines on the right side of the aircraft then shut down and entered the feathered position. Witnesses on the ground near the end of runway 32C observed yellow flames shooting from the back of engine 3. A minute after the number 3 engine failed, the aircraft entered a bank angle of nearly 100 degrees. The right wing clipped trees, causing the aircraft to flip over, and impact the ground at an approximately 45 degree nose-down attitude, exploding on impact. All 7 occupants aboard were killed.

== Investigation ==
=== Initial findings ===
According to the head of the Moscow Interregional Transport Investigation Department, Sergei Zabaturin: "The An-12 plane crash at Domodedovo that killed seven people was caused by a bird entering the engine turbine, which then caused the engines to fail."

=== Final report ===
On December 13, 2007, the final report was released by the Interstate Aviation Committee.

The crash was the result of an uncontrolled roll. The plane rolled over and collided with the ground at the speed of 250–260 km/h (135-140 knots). The effect of the rudder and the ailerons were found to be insufficient to deflect the plane. It is also found that the decrease in the aircraft's airspeed was caused by the lack of thrust from engine No.1 and No.2 and the absence of thrust from engine No.3 and No.4 after hitting the birds.

The flight manual of the An-12 didn't include recommendations for the event of a simultaneous failure of two engines on one side of the wing, and shortcomings were found in the flight manual and technical and methodological support for simulator training. These factors combined precluded the proper level of crew training for actions in such cases.
