= ATRAN =

Russian airline

Atran, LLC ООО «Атран»
IATA	ICAO	Call sign
V8	VAS	ATRAN
- Founded: 1942 (as Moscow Aviation Enterprise)
- Hubs: Domodedovo International Airport
- Secondary hubs: Zhukovsky International Airport
- Fleet size: 1
- Headquarters: Moscow, Russia
- Key people: Roman Romanovch Krishtal (General Director)
- Website: atran.ru

Atran, LLC (Russian: ООО «Атран») is a cargo airline based in Moscow, Russia. It operates cargo charters in Europe, Russia and the CIS. Its main base is Domodedovo International Airport, Moscow.

== History ==
The airline was established and started operations in 1942 as an Aeroflot agency under the name Moscow Aviation Enterprise. The original function of the airline was to deliver spare parts for aircraft.

In 1962 the airline had started operations of heavy freighters, and by the 1980 had a fleet of 29 covering the entire Soviet Union and changing its name to Transport Aviation. In 1990, the company was created as the first independent airline in the Soviet Union and at the same time changing its name to Aviatrans. It became a private public limited liability company in 1993. In January 1997 the name ATRAN began being used.

In September 2023 Atran restarted operations after acquiring two An-12 freighters.

== Fleet ==
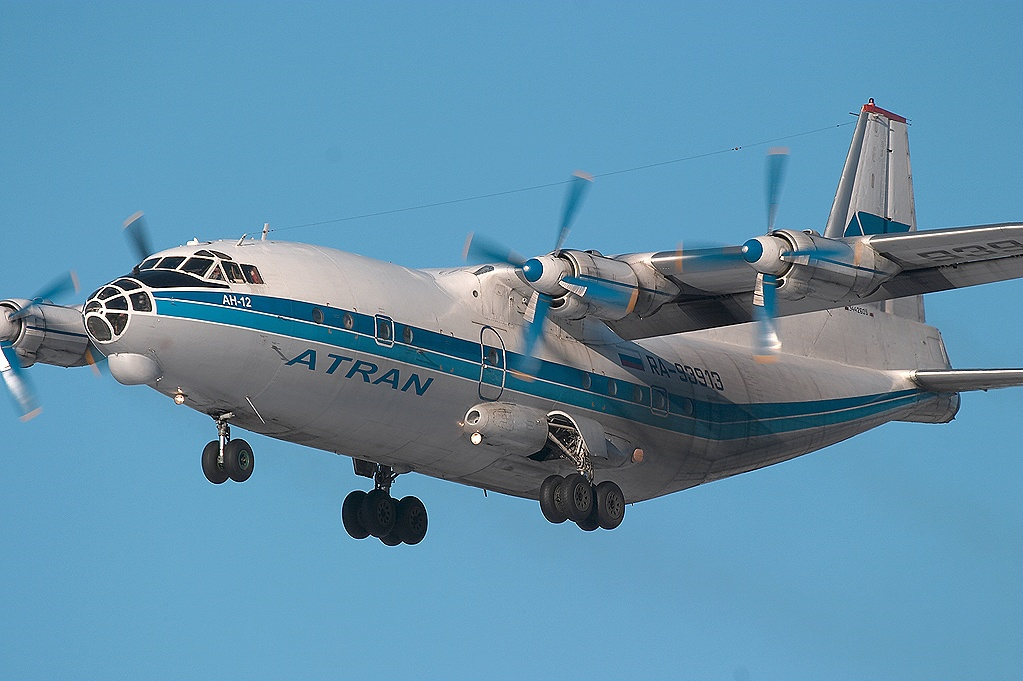
ATRAN Antonov An-12

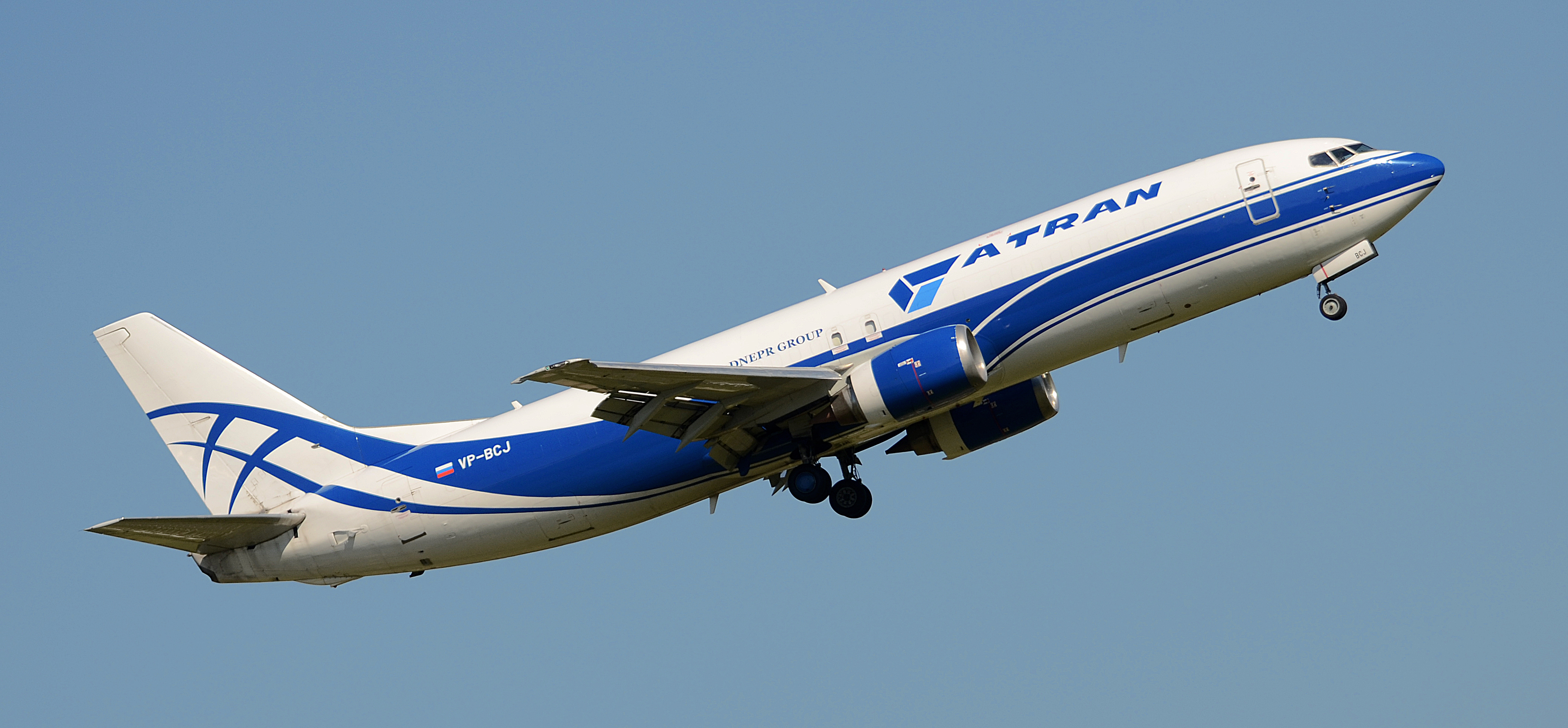
ATRAN Boeing 737-400F

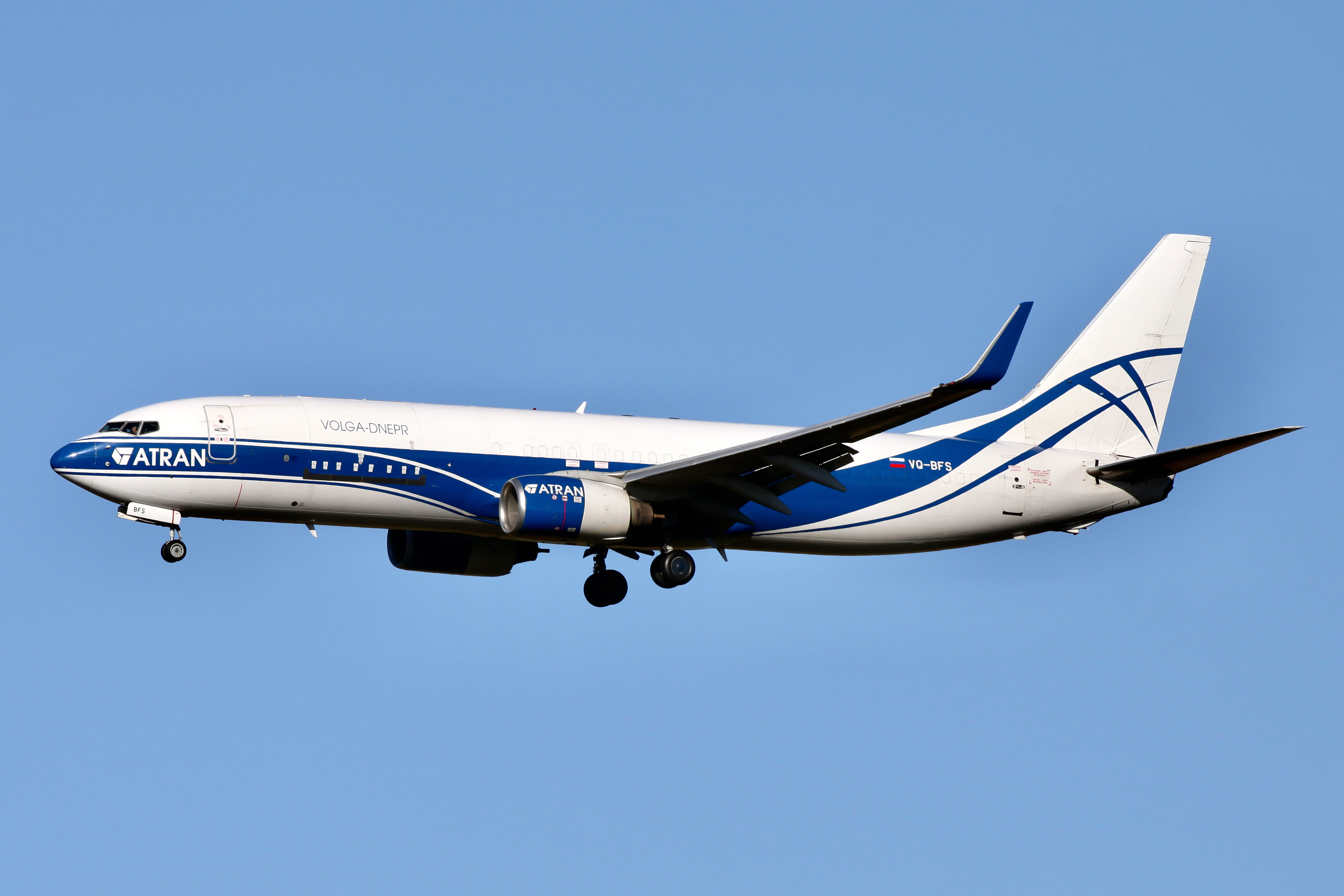
ATRAN Boeing 737-800BCF

=== Current fleet ===
As of August 2025, ATRAN operates the following aircraft:

- 1 Antonov An-12BP

=== Historic fleet ===
ATRAN has previously operated the following aircraft types:

Atran fleet history
Aircraft	Introduced	Retired
Antonov An-2	1973	1975
Antonov An-8	1969	1991
Antonov An-12	1970	Unknown
Antonov An-26	1978	Unknown
Antonov An-32	1988	1998
Boeing 737-400F	2012	2022
Boeing 737-800BCF	2018	2022
Douglas C-47	1943	1954
Ilyushin Il-14	1962	1988
Ilyushin IL-76T	1984	Unknown
Ilyushin IL-76TD	1991	Unknown
Lisunov Li-2	1942	1975
Polikarpov Po-2	1942	1957

== Incidents and accidents ==
- On 29 July 2007, an Atran Antonov An-12, registration RA-93912, crashed 4 km from Domodedovo International Airport after taking off on a flight on the route Moscow-Omsk-Bratsk, killing 7 crew members.
- On 26 March 2025, an ATRAN An-12BK (RA-11371) rolled off the runway at Novy Urengoy Airport after a landing gear failure, all eight on board survived.
