= Ukraine Air Alliance =

Ukrainian cargo airline

IATA	ICAO	Call sign
-	UKL	UKRAINE ALLIANCE
- Founded: 1992
- Commenced operations: 1st: 1992 2nd: 2020
- Ceased operations: 1st time: 5th October 2019 (After Ukraine Air Alliance Flight 4050)
- Hubs: Boryspil International Airport; Kyiv-Zhuliany Airport
- Fleet size: 5
- Headquarters: Kyiv, Ukraine
- Website: uaa-avia.com

Ukraine Air Alliance is a cargo airline based in Kyiv, Ukraine. It operates services to Asia, Africa, North America, South America, and Europe. Its main bases were Boryspil International Airport (KBP) and Zhuliany International Airport (IEV).

== History ==
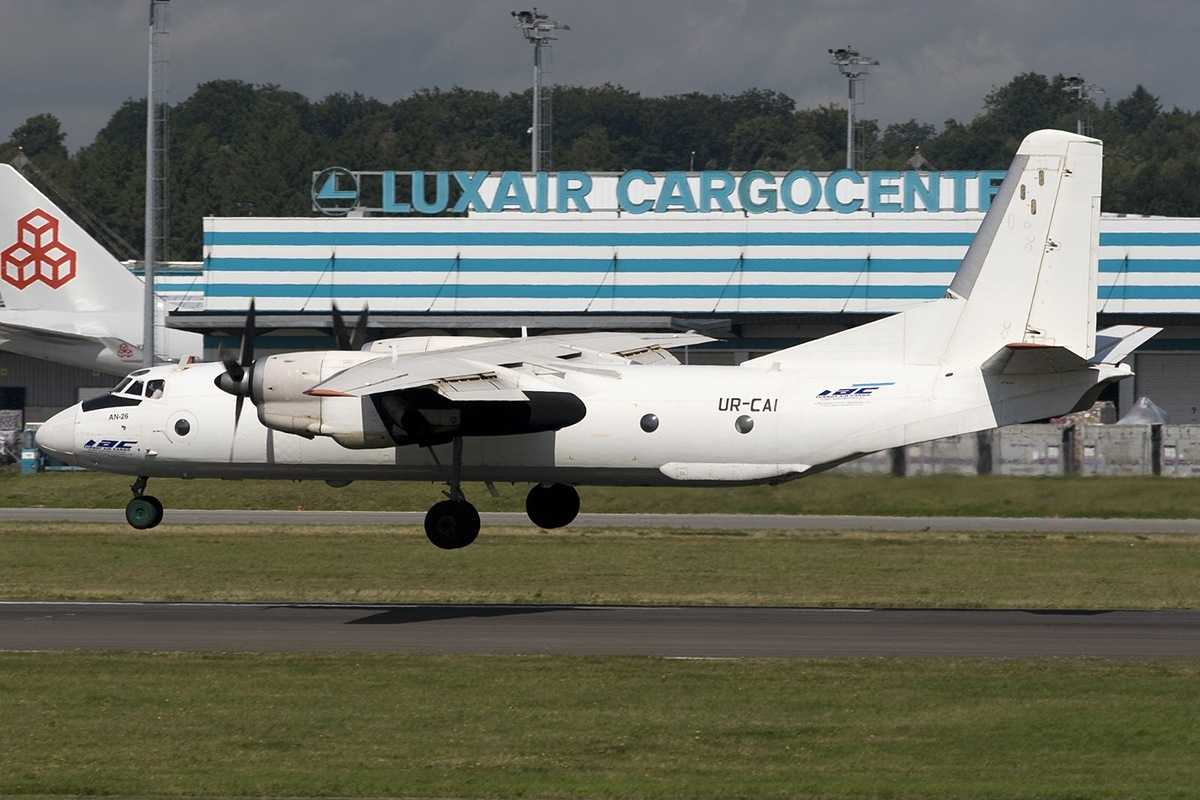
A former Ukraine Air Alliance Antonov An-26

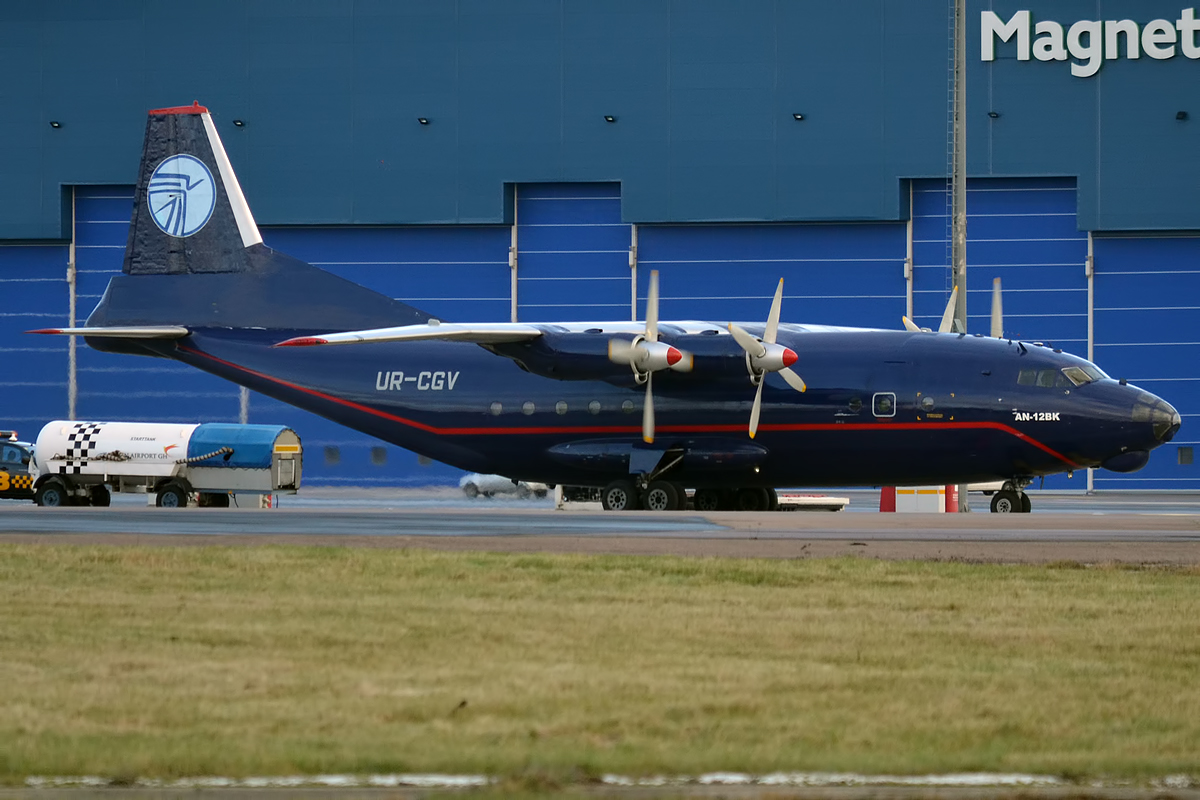
Ukraine Air Alliance Antonov An-12

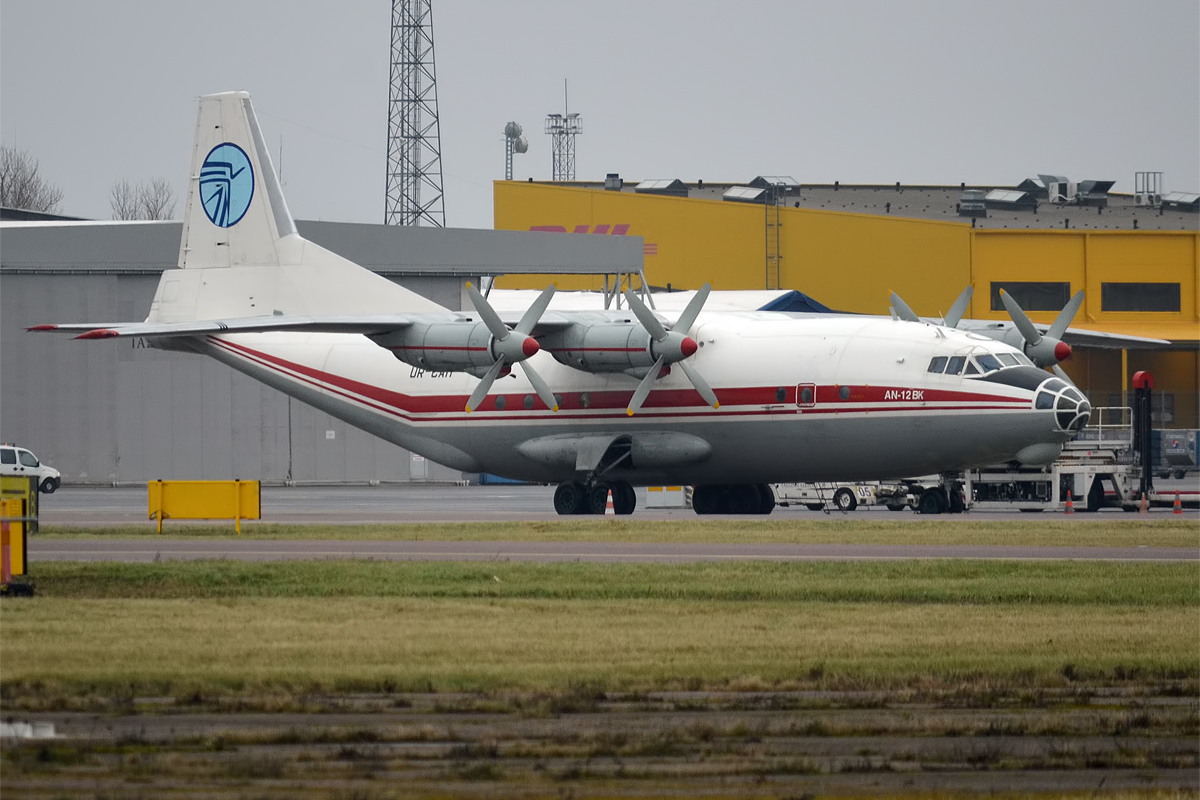
A Ukraine Air Alliance Antonov An-12 (registered as UR-CAH), which crashed on 4 October 2019 as Ukraine Air Alliance Flight 4050.

The airline was established on 28 February 1992 and started operations in 1993. It registered with the Ukrainian authorities as a joint stock company and was one of the first private air enterprises in Ukraine to obtain international status through registration at ICAO. The airline got a "Positive TCO decision" in February 2017, however as of 5 October 2019, it was revoked and the airline was no longer allowed to operate within the EU airspace.

On 31 January 2020, Ukraine Air Alliance successfully received a renewed Air Operator Certificate and operates 4 An-12 aircraft with the following registration numbers: UR-CGV, UR-CAK, UR-CNT and UR-CZZ. All aircraft are equipped according to all latest requirements of ICAO and EASA. The airline has passed SAFA inspections for compliance with the highest standards of flight safety.

== Fleet ==
=== Current fleet ===
As of August 2025, Ukraine Air Alliance operates the following aircraft:

Aircraft	In service	Orders	Notes
Antonov An-12	5	—	
Total	5	—	

=== Former fleet ===
As of October 2019, prior to the crash of flight 4050 and its shutdown, the Ukraine Air Alliance fleet consisted of 7 An-12 aircraft. After renewing the AOC in 2020, Ukraine Air Alliance fleet consists of 5 aircraft: UR-CGV, UR-CAK, UR-CNT, UR-CAJ and UR-CZZ Ukraine Air Alliance has operated the following aircraft types in the past:

- Antonov An-2
- Antonov An-24
- Antonov An-26B
- Antonov An-28
- Antonov An-32B
- Antonov An-74
- Antonov An-124-100
- Ilyushin Il-76MD
- Ilyushin Il-76TD
- Mil Mi-8MT

== Accidents and incidents ==
- On 9 August 2013, Ukraine Air Alliance Flight 751, operated with an Antonov An-12BK (UR-CAG) burned on the ground at Leipzig Airport, Germany. The aircraft had been loaded with live chicks and was preparing for takeoff when a fire broke out in the cargo area. The crew was able to escape before the fire completely destroyed the aircraft. An investigation revealed the fire's source to be an uncontained failure of the auxiliary power unit (APU).
- On 30 August 2014, Ukraine Air Alliance Flight 4012, an An-12BK (UR-DWF) crashed into mountainous terrain shortly after departing Tamanrasset Airport, Algeria for Malabo, Equatorial Guinea. There were no survivors among the seven crew members.
- On 4 October 2019, Ukraine Air Alliance Flight 4050, an An-12BK (UR-CAH) crashed on approach to Lviv-Danylo Halytskyi Airport, Ukraine, inbound from Vigo, Spain. 5 of the 8 people on board died. Photos from the scene suggest the aircraft landed in shrubs about 1,5 km short of the runway. The aircraft sustained serious damage. The cause of the accident is perceived to be pilot error due to fatigue.
