= 1971 in aviation =

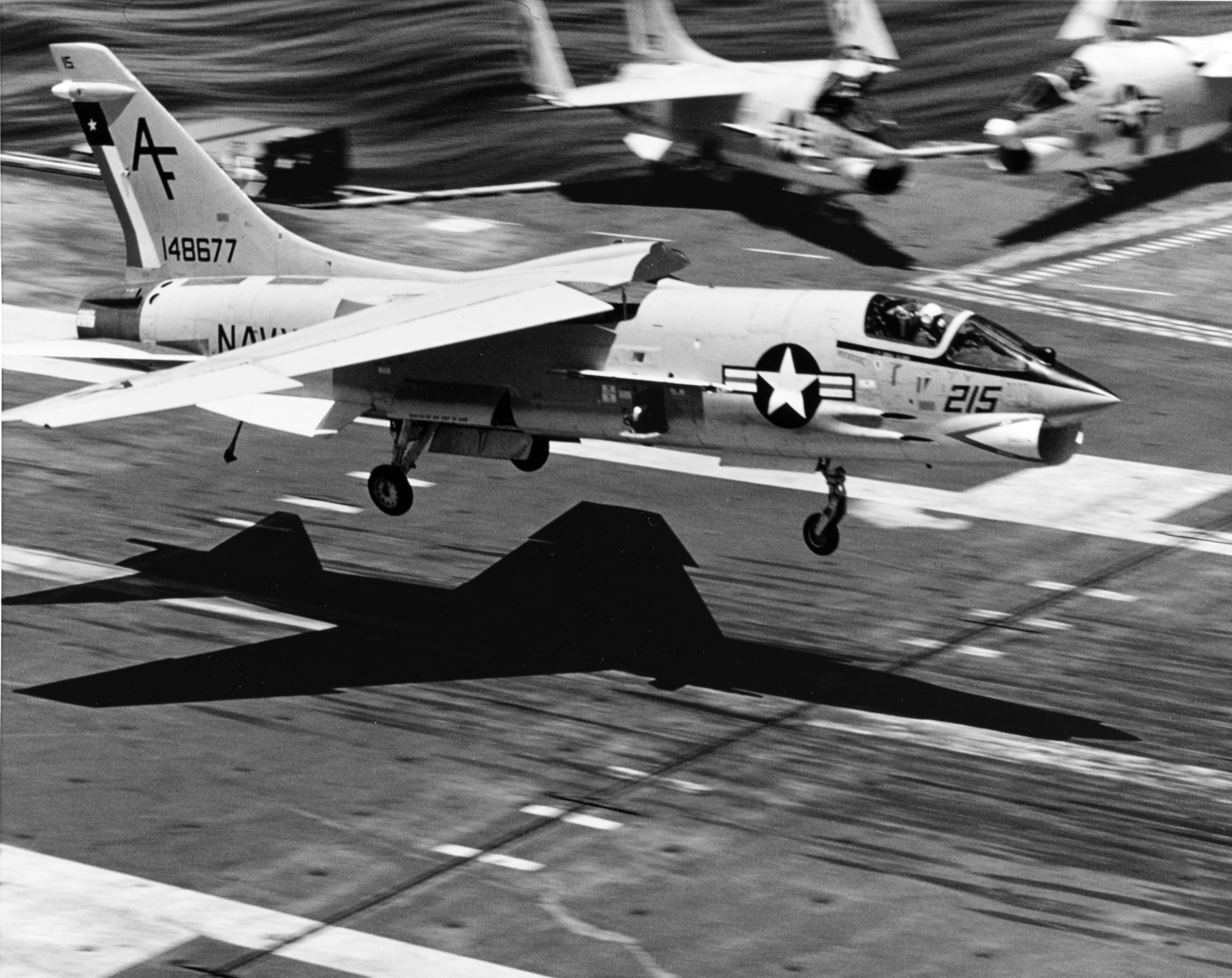
A U.S. Navy Vought F-8H Crusader (BuNo 148677) of U.S. Naval Reserve Fighter Squadron 202 (VF-202) "Superheats" landing on the aircraft carrier USS John F. Kennedy (CVA-67) in 1971. VF-202 was based at Naval Air Station Dallas, Texas (United States), and was having carrier qualifications.

This is a list of aviation-related events from 1971.

== Events ==
- The Peruvian Army reestablishes Peruvian Army Aviation.
- Assessing the prospects for the development of hypersonic airliners, John Becker and Frank Kirkham of the National Aeronautics and Space Administration's (NASA's) Langley Research Center project that a 750,000-pound (340,000 kg) hypersonic transport (HST) capable of Mach 6 speeds and carrying 300 passengers from Los Angeles to Paris, France, in 2 hours 42 minutes could be operating by 1995.
- Erickson Air-Crane Incorporated, the future Erickson Inc., is established.
- Trans European Airways begins flight operations, offering four flights with a Boeing 720.

=== January ===
- January 2 – United Arab Airlines Flight 844, a de Havilland Comet 4C, strikes sand dunes at an altitude of 395 feet (120 meters) while on approach to land in poor visibility at Tripoli, Libya, and crashes, killing all 16 people on board.
- January 3 – Seven hijackers commandeer National Airlines Flight 36, a Douglas DC-8 flying from Los Angeles to Tampa, Florida, with 96 people on board, and force it to fly to Cuba.
- January 6 – The United States Marine Corps takes delivery of its first AV-8A Harriers
- January 15 – Braniff Airways begins Boeing 747 service between Dallas Love Field and Hawaii, using its first Boeing 747, which it acquired in 1970.
- January 18 – A Balkan Bulgarian Airlines Ilyushin Il-18D crashes 0.7 km (0.43 mi) short of the runway on approach to Zurich-Kloten Airport in Switzerland in poor weather and catches fire. Forty-five of the 47 people on board die.
- January 21
  - A French Air Force Nord 262A-34 flying in a blizzard crashes into a 1,342-meter (4,403-foot) high mountain 2.5 kilometers (1.6 miles) south of Mézilhac, France, and comes to rest 200 meters (660 feet) below its summit, killing all 21 people on board. Seven of France's top nuclear experts are among the dead.
  - A Peruvian Air Force Curtiss C-46 Commando carrying members of a civil guard anti-guerrilla force crashes in the Cuti Padre mountain range in the central Andes near Palca, Peru, killing all 35 people on board.
- January 22
  - In the 1971 January 22 Surgut Aeroflot Antonov An-12 crash, an Aeroflot Antonov An-12B—its ice protection system rendered ineffective by a closed valve—crashes on approach to Surgut International Airport in the Soviet Union due to icing, killing all 13 people on board. It is the first of the two very similar crashes that happen at the airport nine days apart.
  - A United States Navy P-3 Orion sets a distance record for an aircraft in its class of 7,010 miles (11,280 km).
  - Four Eritrean hijackers seize control of an Ethiopian Airlines Douglas DC-3 during a domestic flight in Ethiopia from Bahir Dar to Gondar, demanding that it fly to Benghazi, Libya. The airliner stops to refuel at Khartoum before proceeding to Benghazi.
  - Claiming to have a bomb, Black Panther Party member Garland Grant hijacks Northwest Orient Airlines Flight 433, a Boeing 727 on a U.S. domestic flight from Milwaukee to Detroit with 60 people on board. He demands to be flown to Algeria, where he hopes to escape the "racist" Milwaukee Police and help people grow crops. Informed that the jet lacks the range to fly that far, he decides to fly to Cuba instead, where he is imprisoned. He will return to the U.S. in 1978, saying "Cuba is a nightmare."
- January 23 – Armed with homemade hand grenades, Kim Sang-tae attempts to hijack a Korean Airlines Fokker F27 Friendship 500 during a domestic flight in South Korea from Kangnung to Seoul with 60 people on board, demanding to be flown to Sinpo, North Korea, where he believes his brother settled after defecting during the Korean War. Several Republic of Korea Air Force jets intercept the airliner and fire warning shots, forcing it to crash-land on a beach near Sokcho, South Korea. After the plane comes to a halt, the copilot attempts to subdue Kim, who detonates a hand grenade, killing himself and the copilot. The airliner is damaged beyond repair, but the other 58 people aboard the plane survive.
- January 25 – Línea Aeropostal Venezolana Flight 359, a Vickers 749 Viscount on a domestic flight in Venezuela from Mérida to Caracas, strikes trees and crash-lands on a wooded mountain slope in the Andes near La Azulita, killing 13 of the 47 people on board.
- January 26 – A male passenger hijacks an Aerovías Quisqueyana Lockheed L-1049 Super Constellation making a non-scheduled flight from Santo Domingo, Dominican Republic, to San Juan, Puerto Rico, with 74 people on board, demanding to fly to Havana, Cuba. The pilot attempts to divert to Haiti to refuel, but is denied permission to land. He then diverts to Cabo Rojo Airport in the Dominican Republic, where the hijacker is overpowered after the plane lands.
- January 27 - A Jet Commander carrying five men went missing shortly after takeoff from Burlington International Airport. In May 2024, the jet's remains were discovered at the bottom of Lake Champlain.
- January 30 – In the 1971 Indian Airlines hijacking, two Kashmiri men hijack the Indian Airlines Fokker F27 Friendship Ganga and force it to fly to Lahore, Pakistan. They release their hostages there and burn the plane on February 1. India retaliates by prohibiting overflights of its territory by Pakistani aircraft.
- January 31 – In the 1971 January 31 Surgut Aeroflot Antonov An-12 crash, an Antonov An-12 crashes on approach to Surgut International Airport due to icing, killing all seven people on board. It is the second of two very similar crashes that occurred at the airport nine days apart.

=== February ===
- February 1 – McDonnell Douglas completes the 4,000th F-4 Phantom II.
- February 4 – A hijacker commandeers Delta Air Lines Flight 379, a Douglas DC-9 flying from Chicago to Nashville with 27 people on board, and forces it to fly to Cuba.
- February 8
  - The last major airmobile assault of the Vietnam War, Operation Lam Son 719, begins. It involves a ground and helicopter assault by South Vietnamese Army forces against North Vietnamese Army forces in Laos, supported by American helicopters.
  - The Soviet Union awards Leningrad′s Shosseynaya Airport (the future Pulkovo Airport) the Order of the October Revolution.
- February 25 – Western Airlines Flight 328 – a Boeing 737-200 flying from San Francisco to Seattle, U.S., with 97 people on board – is hijacked by United States Army recruit Chapin S. Paterson, who tells a flight attendant that he has a bomb, enters the cockpit, and orders the flight crew to fly him to Cuba. Informed that the plane lacks the range to fly there, he agrees to fly to Canada instead. Ten minutes after arrival at Vancouver International Airport, the other passengers—unaware that the plane had been hijacked and thinking they were arriving at Seattle—disembark, and Chapin announces that he has no bomb, exits the airliner, and surrenders to Canadian authorities. He asks to remain in Canada as a conscientious objector to the Vietnam War, but Canadian courts deny him this status, and he is returned to the U.S. to face criminal charges.

=== March ===
- The United States Marine Corps forms its first attack helicopter squadron.
- March 2 – The U.S. Marine Corps begins combat testing of the AH-1J Sea Cobra in South Vietnam. It is the first attack helicopter specifically designed for use aboard ships.
- March 6 – Aer Lingus takes delivery of its first Boeing 747. The airliner is to be used on transatlantic routes.
- March 8 – Seeking to escape parental pressure over school grades and hoping to seek refuge among American draft evaders in Canada, Thomas Kelly Marston uses a.38-caliber revolver to hijack National Airlines Flight 745 – a Boeing 727 flying from Mobile, Alabama, to New Orleans, Louisiana, with 46 people on board – and demands to be flown to Montreal. The captain talks Marston into surrendering his weapon and offers to fly him back to Mobile, but at Marston's request diverts to Miami, Florida, instead, where Marston is arrested.
- March 11 – Alyemda, internationally known as "Democratic Yemen Airlines" and "Yemen Airlines," is founded as the flag carrier of South Yemen.
- March 17 – Jane Leslie Holley becomes the first woman commissioned into the United States Air Force via the Air Force Reserve Officer Training Corps.
- March 19 – A hijacker commandeers a KLM Douglas DC-8 flying from Paramaribo, Suriname, to Amsterdam in the Netherlands and demands to be flown to Sweden, but surrenders to authorities at Paramaribo.
- March 24 – Federal funding for the Boeing SST project is cut by the United States Congress.
- March 26 – The United States Army′s 1st Cavalry Division (Airmobile) is withdrawn from Vietnam, leaving behind only its 3rd Brigade (Reinforced) at Biên Hòa, South Vietnam.
- March 30 – Six hijackers commandeer a Philippine Air Lines BAC One-Eleven with 50 people on board during a domestic flight in the Philippines from Manila to Davao City and force it to fly to Guangzhou in the People's Republic of China.
- March 31
  - On approach to Voroshilovgrad Airport in Voroshilovgrad in the Soviet Union's Ukrainian Soviet Socialist Republic, Aeroflot Flight 1969, an Antonov An-10 (registration CCCP-11145), suffers the structural failure of its right wing while descending from 1,200 to 600 meters (3,900 to 2,000 ft). It crashes 13 kilometers (8.1 miles) southwest of the airport, killing all 65 people on board. At the time, it is the second-deadliest accident involving an An-10 and the worst aviation accident in the history of Ukraine.
  - Saying he is angry about the conviction of William Calley for murder in the My Lai Massacre, Diego Ramirez, calling himself Diego Landeatta, hijacks Eastern Airlines Flight 939 – a Douglas DC-8 with 22 people on board flying from New York City to San Juan, Puerto Rico – armed only with a pair of clackers. He orders the crew to fly to Havana, Cuba, explaining that this will be his one day of importance. When Cuban soldiers arrest him in Havana, he seems confused, saying that he wants to fly back to the US. He will be imprisoned in Cuba until 1974.
  - Brandishing a pistol and taking a female flight attendant hostage, John Morgan Mathews hijacks Delta Air Lines Flight 400 at Birmingham, Alabama, before it can take off for a flight to Chicago, demanding to be flown to Cuba. The flight attendant convinces him to release all 17 passengers, and after negotiations with Delta Air Lines, he surrenders.

=== April ===
- Using CH-53A Sea Stallion helicopters, the U.S. Navy's Helicopter Mine Countermeasures Squadron 12 (HM-12) and Mobile Mine Countermeaures Command begin the development of specifications for the U.S. Navy's first air mine countermeasures aircraft.
- April 9 – The last major airmobile operation of the Vietnam War, Operation Lam Son 719, ends after North Vietnamese Army forces drive all South Vietnamese forces out of Laos with heavy casualties. Facing the heaviest antiaircraft artillery fire of the war, American helicopter crews have suffered casualties of 176 killed, 1,942 wounded, and 42 missing, with 107 helicopters destroyed and 600 damaged. The operation has demonstrated a need for the U.S. Army to develop a specialized antitank attack helicopter.
- April 21 – A hijacker commandeers Eastern Airlines Flight 403, a Douglas DC-8 with 59 people on board flying from Newark, New Jersey, to Miami, Florida, and demands to be flown to Italy.
- April 25 – An Ecuadorian male passenger attempts to hijack an Avianca Boeing 727-59 (registration HK-1337) during a domestic flight in Colombia from Barranquilla to Medellín with 52 people on board. Passengers and crew members overpower him, and the airliner lands safely in Medellín.
- April 26 – Lieutenant Colonel Thomas B. Estes (pilot) and Major Dewain C. Vick (reconnaissance systems officer) make a record-breaking nonstop flight of 15,000 miles (24,000 km) in an SR-71 Blackbird of the U.S. Air Force's 9th Strategic Reconnaissance Wing, at times exceeding Mach 3. They will receive the MacKay Trophy for the flight.
- April 29 – A male passenger hijacks Avianca Flight 81, a Boeing 720 flying from Los Angeles, California, to Bogotá, Colombia, with a stop en route at Mexico City, Mexico, and demands to be flown to Cuba. The airliner diverts to Panama City, Panama, where the hijacker is arrested.

=== May ===
- May 8
  - A hijacker commandeers Eastern Airlines Flight 403, a Douglas DC-8 with 59 people on board flying from Newark, New Jersey, to Miami, Florida, and demands to be flown to Italy.
  - A Colombian man claiming he has been diagnosed with cancer and cannot be treated in Colombia draws a.38-caliber revolver and hijacks Avianca Flight 706, a Douglas DC-4-1009 (registration HK-173) with 25 people aboard, shortly after takeoff from Montería, Colombia, for a domestic flight to Cartagena. He demands to be flown to Maracaibo, Venezuela. The airliner refuels at Cartagena before proceeding to Maracaibo.
- May 13 – A hijacker commandeers an All Nippon Airways NAMC YS-11 at Haneda Airport in Tokyo, Japan, as it prepares to depart for Sendai, Japan. Security forces storm the airliner and arrest the hijacker.
- May 17 – Holding a knife to the throat of his girlfriend, an American man hijacks an SAS Douglas DC-9 preparing to depart Malmö, Sweden, for a domestic flight to Stockholm. He demands to be flown to the United States to see his mother, but surrenders after 45 minutes.
- May 20 – Boeing announces that it has canceled its Supersonic Transport (SST) project.
- May 23 – Aviogenex Flight 130, a chartered Tupolev Tu-134A (registration YU-AHZ) carrying British vacationers from London's Gatwick Airport, crashes while landing in heavy rain at Rijeka Airport in Rijeka, Yugoslavia, losing its right wing and coming to rest upside down; a fire breaks out and burns the plane out. The crash kills 78 people of the 83 people on board.
- May 24 – Flight testing of the Grumman F-14 Tomcat resumes after the December 30, 1970, crash of the first prototype.
- May 26 – In the 1971 Qantas bomb hoax, a man extorts A$500,000 in ransom from Qantas by claiming to have hidden a bomb aboard Flight 755, a Boeing 707 en route from Sydney to Hong Kong with 116 passengers, that will explode if the aircraft descends. After the flight circles for hours, the ransom is paid, and the man reveals that no bomb exists. The extortionist and an accomplice are later imprisoned, but much of the ransom is never accounted for, and speculation about additional accomplices continues.
- May 27 – Six hijackers commandeer a TAROM Ilyushin Il-14 with 30 people on board during a domestic flight in Romania from Oradea to Bucharest. They force it to divert to Vienna, Austria, where they surrender to the authorities.
- May 28
  - World War II hero and movie star Audie Murphy is among five people killed in the crash of an Aero Commander 680 (registration N601JJ) flying in heavy thunderstorms over mountainous terrain near Catawba, Virginia.
  - James Bennett hijacks Eastern Airlines Flight 30, a Boeing 727 carrying 138 people en route from Miami, Florida, to New York City, claiming to have a bomb and a vial of acid. After landing at La Guardia Airport in New York City, he releases the passengers and five flight attendants, and insists that airline officials bring his ex-wife and a police supervisor to meet him. When his ex-wife refuses to come, he demands to be flown to Ireland. Informed that the plane cannot fly that far, he agrees to fly to Nassau in the Bahamas, and demands $500,000 and a meeting with the Irish Republican Army (IRA). When he disembarks at Nassau, an Eastern Airlines pilot posing as an IRA commander overpowers him. He turns out to have no explosives.
- May 29 – A hijacker commandeers Pan American World Airways Flight 442, a Boeing 707 with 69 people on board, during a flight from Caracas, Venezuela, to Miami, Florida, and forces it to fly to Cuba.

=== June ===
- The last United States Marine Corps helicopters depart Vietnam.
- June 4 – Armed with a.32-caliber pistol and a box containing 50 bullets and wanting to leave the United States before it is incinerated by a "super-bomb," drunken 58-year-old retired coal miner Glen Elmo Riggs hijacks United Airlines Flight 796, a Boeing 737-200 with 72 people on board flying from Charleston, West Virginia, to Newark, New Jersey, and demands to be flown to Israel, where he says he hopes to help build a temple. The airliner diverts to Washington Dulles International Airport in Virginia, where Riggs releases the passengers and waits for a Douglas DC-8 to arrive to take him to Israel. After three hours on the ground, the copilot grabs Riggs′ gun when he leaves it behind in the cockpit while he gets a glass of water. Police then storm the plane and arrest Riggs, who later claims not to remember the events aboard Flight 796.
- June 6 – Hughes Airwest Flight 706, a McDonnell Douglas DC-9-31, and a United States Marine Corps McDonnell Douglas F-4B-18-MC Phantom II of Marine Fighter Attack Squadron 323 (VMFA-323) collide over the San Gabriel Mountains near Duarte, California. Both aircraft crash, killing all 49 people on board the DC-9 and one of the two men in the F-4B.
- June 11 – At O'Hare International Airport in Chicago, Gregory White boards Trans World Airlines Flight 358, a Boeing 727 with 26 people on board preparing to depart for John F. Kennedy International Airport in New York City, without a ticket. He threatens a flight attendant with a gun, demands to be flown to North Vietnam, and shoots passenger Howard Franks when Franks moves toward him; Franks is the first American airline passenger to be killed as a result of a hijacking. The other passengers panic and stampede off the aircraft. While White awaits departure, a Deputy United States Marshal enters through a cockpit window with two guns, giving one to a crew member. When White releases the flight attendant after takeoff, the deputy marshal and the crew member emerge from the cockpit and open fire, wounding White, who fires back and hides behind a row of seats. The airliner lands safely at John F. Kennedy International Airport, where White is wounded again in another exchange of gunfire with a Federal Bureau of Investigation agent and surrenders. Criticized for allowing White to get so far without a ticket, a Trans World Airlines spokesman rejects any changes to the airline's security policies.
- June 17 – After Piedmont Airlines Flight 25, a Boeing 737-200, arrives at Smith Reynolds Airport after a flight from New York City, Bobby Richard White enters the cockpit and orders the pilot to fly him to Cuba, claiming to have nitroglycerine and sulfuric acid in a bag that will explode if he dropped it. Receiving word that the bag did not explode when White casually tossed it onto a car seat before boarding the flight, officials concoct a plan to overpower him. A Piedmont Airlines official dressed as a pilot boards the plane, while a federal air marshal dressed as a pilot walks nearby and distracts White, allowing the Piedmont official to pin White against a wall. White's bag contains no explosives.
- June 18 – Southwest Airlines begins scheduled service with flights from Dallas Love Field to Houston and San Antonio. The airline obtained an air operator's certificate from the State of Texas in February 1968 but had spent 3 years overcoming lawsuits challenging the certificate's validity.
- June 20 – A male passenger with a knife hijacks an Avianca Douglas DC-4 (registration HK-115) shortly after takeoff from Montería, Colombia, demanding to flown to Mexico. The pilot lands the airliner at Medellín, Colombia, and tells the hijacker that they have arrived in Mexico. The crew then overpowers the hijacker.
- June 29 – A hijacker commandeers a Finnair Douglas DC-9-32 during a flight from Helsinki, Finland, to Copenhagen, Denmark. The hijacker is overpowered and the airliner completes its flight safely.

=== July ===
- July 1
  - A hijacker commandeers National Airlines Flight 28 – a Douglas DC-8 flying from New Orleans, Louisiana, to Miami, Florida, with 39 people on board – and forces it to fly to Cuba.
  - Four hijackers take control of a Cruzeiro do Sul Sud Aviation SE-210 Caravelle VIN (registration PP-PDX) with 31 people aboard for a domestic flight in Brazil from Rio de Janeiro to São Paulo, demanding the release of prisoners and to be flown to Cuba. Security forces storm the airliner at Rio de Janeiro and arrest the hijackers.
- July 3 – A NAMC YS-11A-217 operating as Toa Domestic Airlines Flight 63 crashes into the south face of Yokotsu Mountain in Japan, killing all 68 people on board.
- July 4 – A hijacker aboard a Cruzeiro do Sul NAMC YS-11A-202 (registration PP-CTJ) making a domestic flight in Brazil from Belém to Macapá forces the airliner to divert to Cayenne in French Guiana, Georgetown, in Guyana, Trinidad in Trinidad and Tobago, Antigua, and Jamaica.
- July 12 – A Saudi Arabian Airlines Boeing 707 flying from Riyadh, Saudi Arabia, to Beirut, Lebanon, is hijacked and forced to fly to Damascus, Syria.
- July 16 – Jeanne M. Holm is promoted to brigadier general, the first woman in the United States Air Force to become a general.
- July 22 - At 3.30 am, BOAC Flight 045 from London to Khartoum is ordered by air control in Malta (and allegedly forced to obey the order by Libyan military jets) to land at Benghazi (Libya) where two leaders of the unsuccessful 1971 Sudanese coup d'état, travelling as passengers, are forced to leave the plane.
- July 23 – Armed with a stolen pistol, Richard Obergfell takes a flight attendant hostage and hijacks Trans World Airlines (TWA) Flight 335, a Boeing 727 carrying 61 people bound for Chicago, and demands to be flown to Italy to meet a woman. Informed that the 727 lacks the range to reach Italy, he agrees to change planes, and the 727 returns to La Guardia Airport. Obergfell releases all the passengers and crew except for the flight attendant, who he holds at gunpoint while he rides in a van to John F. Kennedy International Airport, where TWA is readying a Boeing 707 for the flight. As Obergfell marches the hostage across the tarmac at John F. Kennedy Airport, a Federal Bureau of Investigation sniper shoots him, and he dies 30 minutes later.
- July 24 – Armed with a small pistol and a stick of dynamite, Santiago Guerra-Valdez hijacks National Airlines Flight 183–a Douglas DC-8 flying from Miami to Jacksonville, Florida, with 83 people on board–and rushes toward the cockpit. When an unsuspecting passenger opens a lavatory door, a spooked Guerra-Valdez opens fire, wounding a flight attendant and a passenger. He then forces the pilot to fly the airliner to Cuba, where he disembarks, and the airliner returns to the U.S.
- July 25 – Four armed members of the Comando Unido Revolucionario Dominicana ("United Dominican Revolutionary Command") hijack an Aeronaves de México Douglas DC-9-15 with 31 people on board after it takes off from Acapulco, Mexico, for a domestic flight to Mexico City, demanding to be flown to Cuba. The airliner stops at Mexico City to refuel before flying to Havana.
- July 28 – A hijacker commanders an Aerolineas Argentinas Boeing 737-287 (registration LV-JMX) with 49 people on board during a domestic flight in Argentina from Salta to Buenos Aires, demanding to be flown to Cuba. The airliner diverts to Córdoba, Argentina, where the hijacker surrenders.
- July 29 – The U.S. Air Force and U.S. National Aeronautics and Space Administration (NASA) complete their joint flight testing of the Martin Marietta X-24A lifting body. The data gathered during the flight-test program will assist in the design of NASA's Space Shuttle.
- July 30
  - A Japan Air Self-Defense Force F-86 Sabre collides with a Boeing 727 operating as All Nippon Airways Flight 58 over Morioka, Japan, killing all 162 people aboard the airliner and injuring the F-86 pilot. It is the worst air disaster in history at the time.
  - Pan American World Airways Flight 845, a Boeing 747-121 with 218 people on board, strikes several approach lighting system structures while taking off from San Francisco International Airport, seriously injuring two passengers and sustaining significant damage. The plane dumps fuel over the Pacific Ocean, returns to the airport 1 hour 42 minutes after takeoff, and makes an emergency landing; the crew then orders an emergency evacuation, during which 27 passengers are injured, eight of them sustaining serious back injuries. There are no fatalities.

=== August ===
- August 22 – A hijacker commandeers a United Arab Airlines Ilyushin Il-18 flying from Cairo, Egypt, to Amman, Jordan, demanding to be flown to Israel. The hijacker is subdued.

=== September ===
- The Concorde crosses the Atlantic Ocean for the first time.
- Air Florida is founded. It will begin flight operations in September 1972.
- September 3 – Grabbing a stewardess aboard Eastern Airlines Flight 993 – a Douglas DC-9 flying from Chicago, Illinois, to Miami, Florida, with 86 people on board – about 20 minutes before landing in Miami, 20-year-old Juan Miguel Borges Guerra holds an ice pick to her throat and demands to be taken to Havana, Cuba. Two Eastern Airlines employees riding aboard the plane as passengers overpower him.
- September 4 – Alaska Airlines Flight 1866, a Boeing 727-100, crashes into the eastern slope of a canyon in the Chilkat Range of the Tongass National Forest while on approach to land at Juneau, Alaska, killing all 111 people on board. It is the deadliest single-plane crash in American history at the time, and will remain so until June 1975.
- September 6 – After the tank for its water-injection engine thrust-augmentation system is mistakenly filled with jet fuel instead of water, both engines of Paninternational Flight 112, a BAC 1-11-500, fail after takeoff from Hamburg Airport in Hamburg, West Germany. The flight crew makes an emergency landing on the Bundesautobahn 7 highway; the plane strikes a bridge, shearing off both wings and setting the plane on fire. Twenty-two of the 121 people aboard die and 99 are injured.
- September 8 – A young woman pulls a hand grenade out from under her wig and hijacks an Alia Sud Aviation SE-210 Caravelle flying from Beirut, Lebanon, to Amman, Jordan, with 56 people on board. The airliner diverts to Benghazi, Libya, where she surrenders.
- September 11 – The Britten-Norman Trislander makes its first flight.
- September 13 – Lin Biao, second-in-charge of the People's Republic of China, is killed in the crash of a Hawker Siddeley Trident near Öndörkhaan, Mongolia.
- September 16 – A hijacker a board an Alia Sud Aviation SE-210 Caravelle flying from Beirut, Lebanon, to Amman, Jordan, demands to be flown to Iraq. The hijacker is subdued.
- September 24 – At Detroit Metropolitan Wayne County Airport in Detroit, Michigan, sky marshals arrest a female passenger aboard American Airlines Flight 124 – a Boeing 727 with 76 people on board – before takeoff for a flight to New York City. Carrying a handbag containing a gun and explosives, she had planned to hijack the airliner and demand the release from prison of Black Panther Party members.

=== October ===
- In the Mediterranean, a U.S. Navy air mine countermeasures unit participates in an overseas exercise for the first time.
- October 1 – Aurigny Air Services commences operations with the Britten-Norman Trislander.
- October 4 – Two hijackers demanding to be flown to Iraq commandeer an Alia Sud Aviation SE-210 Caravelle flying from Beirut, Lebanon, to Amman, Jordan, with 67 people on board. After the airliner lands in Amman, the hijackers are subdued.
- October 9 – When a visibly nervous 31-year-old Richard Frederick Dixon is stopped for questioning while boarding Eastern Airlines Flight 953 – a Boeing 727 flying from Detroit, Michigan, to Miami, Florida, with 46 people on board – he pulls out a pistol, takes a stewardess hostage, and demands that the plane fly him to Cuba, saying that he admires radical activist Angela Davis and has a distaste for life in the United States. While Dixon holds his gun on the stewardess for three hours, the airliner's captain, who also had been hijacked to Cuba in 1961, flies the airliner to Cuba, where Cuban soldiers take Dixon into custody.
- October 10 – United Arab Airlines changes its name to EgyptAir.
- October 12 – Two passengers hijack an Avensa Convair CV-580 (registration YV-C-AVA) during a domestic flight in Venezuela from Barcelona to Caracas and demand that it fly them to Cuba. The airliner stops to refuel at Curaçao, where the hijackers release three mothers and their young children, then proceeds to Havana, Cuba.
- October 14 – The Hague Hijacking Convention, formally the "Convention for the Suppression of Unlawful Seizure of Aircraft," enters into force. It requires signatory countries to prohibit and punish the hijacking of civilian aircraft in situations in which an aircraft takes off or lands in a place different from its country of registration. It also establishes the principle of aut dedere aut judicare, which holds that a party to the convention must prosecute an aircraft hijacker if no other state requests his or her extradition for prosecution of the same crime.
- October 16 – A hijacker seizes control of an Olympic Airways NAMC YS-11 with 64 people on board during a domestic flight in Greece from Kalamata to Athens and demand that it fly to Lebanon. After the airliner lands at Athens, security forces storm it and arrest the hijacker.
- October 18 – Recently paroled after serving five years in prison for manslaughter and armed with a small-caliber pistol, Del Lavon Thomas hijacks Wien Consolidated Airlines Flight 15 – a Boeing 737-200 with 35 people on board making a flight in Alaska from Anchorage to Bethel – and demands that it stop at Vancouver, British Columbia, Canada, to refuel, then take him to Mexico City, Mexico. After it takes off from Vancouver to fly to Mexico City, Thomas changes his mind and orders it to return to Vancouver, where he enters into negotiations with the Royal Canadian Mounted Police, hoping to find a way to avoid going to jail for his actions. After realizing that avoiding prison is impossible, he surrenders quietly to the police.
- October 20 – Six people hijack a SAETA Vickers Viscount during a domestic flight in Ecuador from Quito to Cuenca.
- October 25 – A hijacker commandeers Pan American World Airways Flight 98 – a Boeing 747 with 236 people on board flying from New York City to San Juan, Puerto Rico – and forces it to fly to Havana, Cuba.
- October 26 – A 20-year-old hijacker armed with a gun seizes control of an Olympic Airways Douglas DC-6B with 64 people on board during a domestic flight in Greece from Athens to Crete and demands that it fly to Rome, Italy. Passengers overpower the hijacker.
- October 27 – The Democratic Republic of the Congo changes its name to Zaire, prompting its national airline to change its name from Air Congo to Air Zaïre.

=== November ===
- November 10 – After its flight crew radios that it cannot reach its destination due to bad weather, a Merpati Nusantara Airlines Vickers Viscount bound for Padang on Sumatra in Indonesia crashes into the Indian Ocean off Padang, killing all 69 people on board. It is the deadliest aviation accident in Indonesian history at the time.
- November 13 – Armed with a sawed-off shotgun, Paul Joseph Cini hijacks Air Canada Flight 812, a Douglas DC-8, during a domestic flight in Canada from Calgary, Alberta, to Toronto, Ontario, identifying himself as a member of the Irish Republican Army and threatening to blow up the plane with dynamite if he does not receive $1.5 million and a flight to Ireland. The airliner diverts to Great Falls, Montana, where Air Canada gives him $50,000, which was all the money it could scrape together on short notice. Cini accepts the reduced amount, and the DC-8 takes off to return to Calgary to refuel. During the flight to Calgary, Cini orders the flight crew to open an emergency exit so that he can parachute from the plane, but he unable to untie twine he has used to tie up a parachute he has brought aboard. When one of the pilots hands Cini a fire ax to use to cut the twine, Cini puts his shotgun down. The pilot kicks the shotgun away and grabs Cini, and another crew member fractures Cini's skull with the ax, bringing the hijacking to an end. Cini is arrested and jailed.
- November 17 – A hijacker takes control of an Arawak Airlines Beechcraft Model 99 making a domestic flight in Trinidad and Tobago from Port-of-Spain, Trinidad, to Tobago, demanding to be flown to Cuba. The plane returns to Trinidad, where the hijacker surrenders.
- November 24 – A man identifying himself as "Dan Cooper" uses a bomb threat to hijack Northwest Orient Airlines Flight 305 – a Boeing 727-51 with 35 other passengers and a crew of six on board flying from Portland, Oregon, to Seattle, Washington – demanding US$200,000 and four parachutes. Receiving the money and parachutes at Seattle-Tacoma International Airport, he allows all passengers and two flight attendants to leave the plane, then orders it flown toward Mexico City; soon after takeoff, he parachutes from the plane with his money, and the airliner lands safely at Reno, Nevada, dragging its aft stairway down the runway. The hijacker is never seen or heard from again and also is never positively identified. The press mistakenly identifies "Dan Cooper" as "D. B. Cooper", the name of another individual questioned in the case, and he goes down in history incorrectly as "D. B. Cooper".
- November 27 – Three hijackers commandeer Trans World Airlines Flight 106 – a Boeing 727 with 49 people on board flying from Albuquerque, New Mexico, to Chicago, Illinois – and force it to fly to Cuba.

=== December ===
- The U.S. Army's 101st Airborne Division (Airmobile) begins to withdraw from Vietnam.
- December 3 – A hijacker commandeers a Pakistan International Airlines Boeing 720 with 28 passengers on board as it taxis at Orly Airport outside Paris, France, for a flight to Karachi, Pakistan, demanding emergency supplies for East Pakistan. Security forces subdue the hijacker.
- December 3 – The Indo-Pakistani War of 1971 begins with a Pakistani Air Force attempt at a preemptive strike against Indian Air Force bases, employing no more than 50 aircraft. The strike initially attacks the wrong bases, then mostly misses Indian aircraft when attacking the right bases, and Indian bases are out of action for only a few hours. The Pakistani Air Force then falls into a defensive role for the remainder of the war.
- December 9–10 (overnight) – Helicopters airlift the Indian Army's 311th Mountain Brigade Group over the Meghna River in East Pakistan, allowing Indian forces to maintain the momentum of their drive on Dacca.
- December 10 – President Richard M. Nixon warns North Vietnam that American bombing of North Vietnam would resume if North Vietnamese military action against South Vietnam increases as American forces are withdrawn from Vietnam.
- December 11 – The Indian Army's 2nd Parachute Brigade parachutes from Indian Air Force Antonov An-12s, DHC-4 Caribous, C-82 Packets, and C-47 Dakotas north of Tangail, East Pakistan, prompting a disorganized retreat by the Pakistani Army's 93rd Brigade.
- December 12 – Four young Nicaraguan men demanding to be taken to Cuba – where they hope to attend college without having to pay tuition – hijack a LANICA BAC One-Eleven (registration AN-BBI) during a flight from San Salvador, El Salvador, to Managua, Nicaragua. When the son of Nicaragua's Minister of Agriculture, a passenger on the plane, tries to resist them, they shoot him in the leg. The airliner diverts to San José, Costa Rica, where 200 soldiers surround the plane and shoot out its tires. President of Costa Rica José "Don Pepe" Figueres Ferrer arrives at the airport armed with a submachine gun and takes part in a subsequent assault on the plane by security forces, which begins with a tear gas attack and culminates in a gun battle in which two of the hijackers are killed and the other two are arrested.
- December 16 – A hijacker demanding to be flown to Cuba seizes control of a Lloyd Aéreo Boliviano Fairchild F27 during a domestic flight in Bolivia from Sucre to La Paz. The airliner diverts to Cochabamba, Bolivia, where security forces storm the plane and arrest the hijacker. One crew member and one passenger are killed during the incident.
- December 17 – The Indo-Pakistani War of 1971 comes to an end. The Indian Air Force has lost 72 aircraft and the Pakistani Air Force 94 aircraft.
- December 22 – A hijacker commandeers a North Cay Airways Britten-Norman BN-2A-6 Islander with seven people on board during a domestic flight in the Dominican Republic from Santiago de los Caballeros to Santo Domingo. The airliner diverts to Dajabón, Dominican Republic, where it swerves upon landing, suffering minor damage.
- December 24
  - Flying in a thunderstorm and severe turbulence, LANSA Flight 508, a Lockheed L-188A Electra, is struck by lightning and disintegrates in mid-air high over Puerto Inca in eastern Peru's Amazon rainforest, killing 91 of the 92 people aboard. The only survivor is 17-year-old Juliane Koepcke, who survives a 2-mile (3.2 km) fall into the rainforest strapped in her seat, her fall cushioned by the foliage, and walks for 10 days before finding help; 14 other people also survive their falls from the plane but die in the jungle without being rescued. The lost aircraft was the last one in LANSA's fleet, leading to the airline going out of business 11 days later.
  - Firing a .38-caliber revolver twice and claiming to have seven sticks of dynamite in a suitcase, 25-year-old Everett Holt takes a stewardess hostage aboard Northwest Orient Airlines Flight 734, a Boeing 707 with 35 people on board flying from Minneapolis, Minnesota, to Chicago, Illinois. He demands that a ransom of US$300,000 in cash and two parachutes be delivered to him by armored truck when the airliner lands at O'Hare International Airport in Chicago. After the money and parachutes arrive, Holt releases the three stewardesses and all but one of the passengers, planning to force the remaining hostage to use the extra parachute to jump from the plane with him. Before the plane can take off again, however, the flight crew escapes, and the U.S. Federal Bureau of Investigation blinds Holt with floodlights and orders him to surrender by megaphone. Smiling broadly, he immediately complies, having held the plane for five hours. His pistol turns out to be loaded only with blanks, and his suitcase has no dynamite in it.
- December 26
  - The United States begins Operation Proud Deep Alpha, which consists of air strikes in three provinces of North Vietnam south of the 20th Parallel. The operation will conclude on December 30.
  - A fugitive after a botched bank robbery in New York City, Republic of New Africa member Patrick Critton hijacks Air Canada Flight 932, a Douglas DC-9-32 with 89 people on board, shortly before it lands at Toronto, Ontario, Canada, at the end of a flight from Thunder Bay, Ontario. Claiming to have fragmentation grenades and a .38-caliber revolver, he forces the plane to fly him to Havana, Cuba. It is the first successful hijacking in Canada. Critton will live in Cuba until 1974, then in Tanzania until 1994, before returning undetected to the United States. He finally will be arrested at his home in Mount Vernon, New York on September 8, 2001.
  - Acting strangely and making jokes about hijacking the plane during the flight, 24-year-old Donald Coleman pulls out a toy pistol aboard American Airlines Flight 47 – a Boeing 707 with 85 people on board flying from Chicago, Illinois, to San Francisco, California – and demands US$250,000, claiming to be a former United Airlines pilot and to have a bomb that would detonate if the airliner descends below an altitude of 25,000 feet (7,600 meters). He forces the plane to land at Salt Lake City, Utah, where a United States Marine aboard as a passenger tackles and overpowers him as he tries to escape by jumping out of an emergency exit. Cokeman is arrested without further incident.
- December 31 – 2,500 Bangladeshi former employees of Pakistan International Airlines submit a proposal to the Government of Bangladesh to create Air Bangladesh, a national airline for the newly independent Bangladesh. The airline, named Biman Bangladesh Airlines, will be founded in January 1972 and begin flight operations in February 1972.

== First flights ==
- Ilyushin Il-62M

=== January ===
- January 20 – Grumman E-2C Hawkeye
- January 22 – Cessna XMC

=== February ===
- February 26 – Saab-MFI 15

=== March ===
- AEREON 26
- March 15 – VFW-Fokker H3 Sprinter D-9543
- March 21 – Westland Lynx XW835
- March 25 – Ilyushin Il-76 SSSR-86712
- March 26 – CASA C.212 Aviocar
- March 31 – SH-2D Sea Sprite

=== April ===
- April 22 – Aero Boero AB-210
- April 29 – Piper PA-48 Enforcer

=== May ===
- May 18 -Cerva CE.43 Guépard
- May 28 – Dassault Mercure F-WTCC

=== July ===
- July 14 – VFW-614 D-BABA
- July 17 — Schleicher ASW 17
- July 20
  - Ilyushin Il-38 Dolphin (NATO reporting name "May")
  - Mitsubishi T-2
- July 23 – GAF Nomad VH-SUP
- July 30 – Robin HR200

=== August ===
- August 4 – Agusta A109
- August 24 — Lockspeiser LDA-01

=== September ===
- September 3 – Embraer Xavante
- September 10 – Bell 309 KingCobra N309J
- September 10 – VFW VAK 191B
- September 11 – Britten-Norman Trislander
- September 12 - Operation Sigma Sigma
- September 12 – Bede BD-5 N500BD
- September 17 — FLUGWAG Bremen ESS 641
- September 18 — Weybridge Man Powered Aircraft
- September 30 – Avro Shackleton AEW2 WL745

=== October ===
- October 21 – Italair F.20 Pegaso I-GEAV

=== December ===
- Aerosport Quail N88760
- December 16 — Nihon N-70 Cygnus

== Entered service ==
- Agusta-Bell AB.212

=== January ===
- January 6 – First Hawker Siddeley AV-8A Harrier was accepted by the United States Marine Corps.
- January 20 – McDonell Douglas RF-4E Phantom II with West German Air Force
- January 29 – EA-6 Prowler with VAQ-129 at NAS Whidbey Island

=== February ===
- February 15 – Boeing 747-200B with KLM.

=== April ===
- April 1 – Hawker Siddeley Trident 3B with British European Airways
- April 15 – Hawker Siddeley AV-8A Harrier with VMA-513 of the United States Marine Corps

=== May ===
- May 3 – Bell CH-135 with the Canadian Armed Forces

=== August ===
- August 5 – McDonnell Douglas DC-10 with American Airlines

=== October ===
- Beechcraft King Air Model A100
- October 1 – Britten-Norman Trislander with Aurigny Air Services

=== December ===
- Bell CH-136 (ex-COH-58A) with the Canadian Armed Forces

== Deadliest crash ==
The deadliest crash of this year was All Nippon Airways Flight 58, a Boeing 727 which collided with a Japanese Air Force Mitsubishi F-86F Sabre near Shizukuishi, Japan on 30 July, killing all 162 people on board Flight 58. The deadliest single-aircraft accident was Alaska Airlines Flight 1866, also a Boeing 727, which crashed into mountainous terrain near Juneau, Alaska, U.S. on 4 September, killing all 111 people on board.
