= 1971 Surgut Aeroflot Antonov An-12 crash =

1971 Surgut Aeroflot Antonov An-12 crash may refer to either one of the two similar accidents that happened within 9 days of each other:

- 1971 January 22 Surgut Aeroflot Antonov An-12 crash
- 1971 January 31 Surgut Aeroflot Antonov An-12 crash
