= Surgut crash =

Surgut crash may refer to:

- 22 January 1971 Surgut Aeroflot Antonov An-12 crash
- 31 January 1971 Surgut Aeroflot Antonov An-12 crash

== See also ==
- Kolavia Flight 348, passenger flight that caught fire while taxiing out of Surgut
