= N70 =

N70 may refer to:

== Roads ==
- N70 road (Ireland)
- N-70 National Highway, in Pakistan
- N70 highway, in the Philippines
- Nebraska Highway 70, in the United States

== Other uses ==
- N70 (Long Island bus)
- IBM NetVista N70, a computer
- Nihon N-70 Cygnus, a Japanese powered sailplane
- Nikon N70, a camera
- Nokia N70, a mobile phone
- Toyota Hilux (N70), a Japanese pickup truck
- Xiaomi SkyNomad N70, a Chinese range-extended electric mid-size SUV
