= F70 =

F70 or F.70 may refer to:

== Vehicles ==
Aircraft

- Farman F.70, a French transport aircraft
- Fokker 70, a Dutch airliner

Automobiles

- Daihatsu Rocky (F70), a Japanese off-road vehicle
- Ferrari F70, an Italian sports car
- Changan F70, a Chinese pickup truck
- Toyota Kijang (F70), a Japanese pickup truck

Ships

- Georges Leygues-class frigates, a class of anti-submarine frigates of the French Navy
- HMS Apollo (F70), a Leander-class frigate of the Royal Navy

== Other uses ==
- French Valley Airport, in Riverside County, California
- Mild mental retardation
- Nikon F70, a camera
