= FLUGWAG Bremen ESS 641 =

ESS 641

General information
- Type: Glider tug
- National origin: Germany
- Manufacturer: Flugwissenschaftliche Arbeitsgemeinschaft Bremen

History
- First flight: 17 September 1971

The FLUGWAG Bremen ESS 641 was a 1970s German glider-towing monoplane designed and built by the Flugwissenschaftliche Arbeitsgemeinschaft Bremen research organisation.

== Design and development ==
The ESS 641 is a low-wing cantilever monoplane with a fixed tail-wheel landing gear. Powered by a 180 hp (134 kW) Avco Lycoming O-360 flat-four piston engine. The pilot had an enclosed cockpit with a transparent canopy.

== Specifications ==
Data from The Illustrated Encyclopedia of Aircraft

General characteristics

- Crew: 1
- Length: 23 ft 11.5 in (7.30 m)
- Wingspan: 34 ft 5.5 in (10.50 m)
- Height: 7 ft 4.5 in (2.25 m)
- Wing area: 177.61 sq ft (16.50 m^{2})
- Empty weight: 1,221 lb (554 kg)
- Gross weight: 1,543 lb (700 kg)
- Powerplant: 1 × Avco Lycoming O-360-A3A flat-four piston engine , 180 hp (134 kW)

Performance

- Maximum speed: 124 mph (200 km/h, 108 kn)
