= Nikon F70 =

1994 35mm single-lens reflex camera

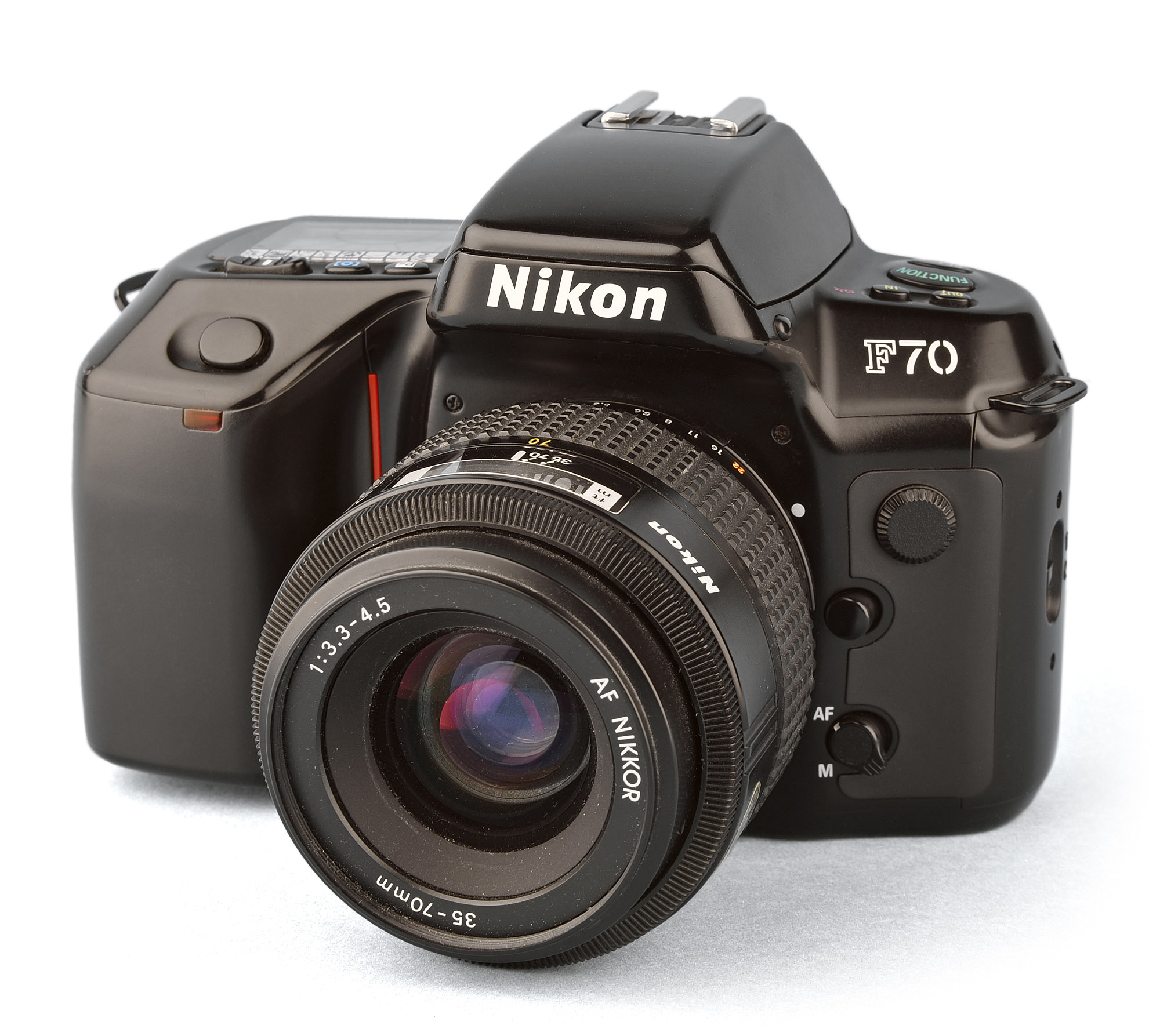
- Nikon F70

Overview
- Maker: Nikon
- Type: SLR
- Released: 1994

Lens
- Lens mount: Nikon F-mount
- Lens: interchangeable lens, Nikon F-mount
- Compatible lenses: Nikon F-mount lenses

Sensor/medium
- Film format: 35mm
- Film size: 36mm x 24mm

Focusing
- Focus modes: Autofocus

Shutter
- Shutter: electromagnetically controlled

General
- Weight: 585 g (20.6 oz)
- Made in: Japan

The Nikon F70 (or N70 as it is known in the U.S.) is an SLR camera formerly manufactured by the Japanese Company Nikon. Introduced in 1994, it is the predecessor to the Nikon F80. This camera is known for its unique user interface, which uses a combination of function and set buttons along with a thumb wheel to navigate the nested settings. It is quite distinct compared to other Nikon SLRs of the same era.

== Specification ==
Item	Description
Type	Integral-motor autofocus 35mm single-lens reflex.
Picture format	24mm x 36mm (Standard 35mm film format).
Lens mount	Nikon F mount.
Focus modes	Autofocus, and manual with electronic rangefinder.
Autofocus area	Wide and Spot selectable.
Autofocus modes	Single Servo AF and Continuous Servo AF.
Focus Tracking	Automatically activated when subject moves.
Autofocus detection system	Nikon CMA274 autofocus module.
Autofocus detection range	Approx. EV -1 to EV 19 (at ISO 100).
Autofocus lock	Possible once stationary subject is in focus in single Servo AF.
Metering modes	Matrix, center-weighted, spot.
Shutter speeds	Lithium niobate oscillator-controlled speeds from 1/4000 to 30 sec in 1/3EV step.

== Key features ==
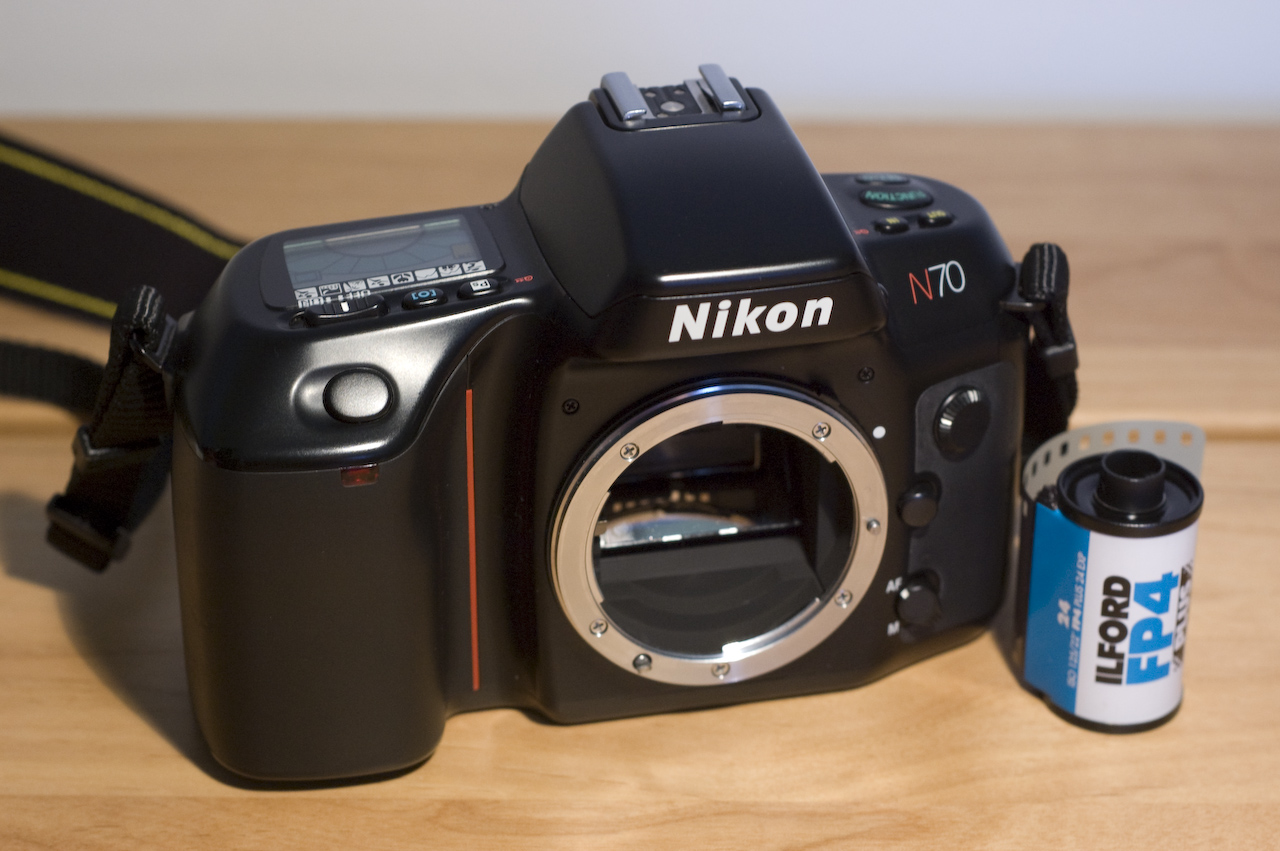
Nikon N70 body

F70D version features built-in panorama mode, which crops the top and bottom parts of the image, producing 13 × 36mm image. It also features data imprinting back.

- 3D Matrix Metering using 8-segment Matrix Sensor
- Built-in retractable Speedlight with 3D Multi-Sensor Balanced Fill-Flash
- Vari-Program [P] system
- Large, informative LCD, coordinated in shape and color with the control buttons
- Two 3V CR123A (or DL123) lithium batteries

Class	1950s					1960s										1970s										1980s										1990s										2000s										2020s			
Class	55	56	57	58	59	60	61	62	63	64	65	66	67	68	69	70	71	72	73	74	75	76	77	78	79	80	81	82	83	84	85	86	87	88	89	90	91	92	93	94	95	96	97	98	99	00	01	02	03	04	05	06	07	08	09	...	20	21	22
Professional					F																					F3																																	
Professional																	F2												F3AF					F4								F5								F6									
High-end																													FA					F-801 (N8008)/ F-801s (N8008s)				F90 (N90)		F90X (N90s)					F100														
Mid-range																																F-501 (N2020)				F-601 (N6006)				F70 (N70)						F80 (N80)													
Mid-range																		EL / EL2 /ELW						FE					FE2							F-601M (N6000)				F70 (N70)						F80 (N80)													
Mid-range											FT		FTn/ FT2/ FT3										FM					FM2/FM2n																			FM3A												
Mid-range											FS												FM					FM2/FM2n																			FM3A												
Entry-level																																																											
Entry-level																																										Pronea S																	
Entry-level																																									Pronea 600i/6i																		
Entry-level								Nikkorex F / Nikkor J																	EM			FG			F-301 (N2000)				F-401s (N4004s)					F50 (N50)							F65 (N65 / U)		F75 (N75 / U2)										
Entry-level						35		35 II		Auto 35																				FG-20			F-401 (N4004)				F-401x (N5005)								F60 (N60)			F55 (N55)											
Entry-level									Zoom 35																																FM10 / FE10																		
Class	55	56	57	58	59	60	61	62	63	64	65	66	67	68	69	70	71	72	73	74	75	76	77	78	79	80	81	82	83	84	85	86	87	88	89	90	91	92	93	94	95	96	97	98	99	00	01	02	03	04	05	06	07	08	09	...	20	21	22
Class	1950s					1960s										1970s										1980s										1990s										2000s										2020s			
