= 31 January 1971 Surgut Aeroflot Antonov An-12 crash =

Aviation accident in the Soviet Union

1971 January 31 Surgut Aeroflot Antonov An-12 crash
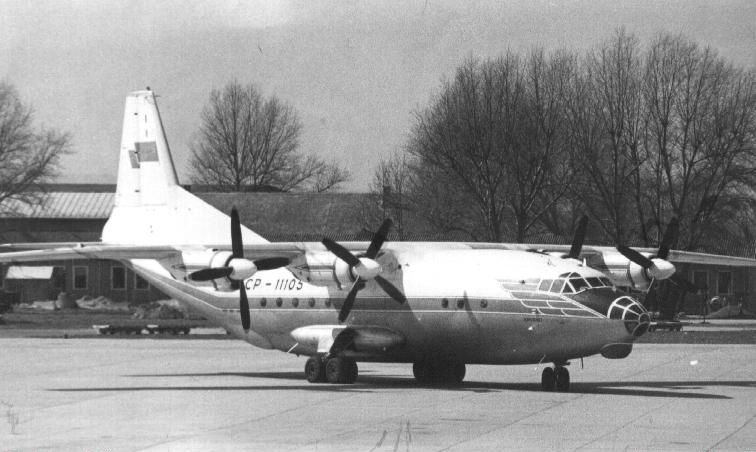
- An Aeroflot Antonov An-12, similar to the aircraft involved in the accident

Accident
- Date: 31 January 1971
- Summary: Loss of control due to icing
- Site: Surgut, RSFSR, Soviet Union; 61°15′N 73°25′E

Aircraft
- Aircraft type: Antonov An-12B
- Operator: Aeroflot, Tyumen Civil Aviation Directorate
- Registration: CCCP-12996
- Flight origin: Roshchino International Airport
- Destination: Surgut International Airport
- Passengers: 1
- Crew: 6
- Fatalities: 7
- Survivors: 0

The 31 January 1971 Surgut Aeroflot Antonov An-12 crash occurred when an Aeroflot Antonov An-12B, aircraft registration CCCP-12996, flying from Roshchino International Airport, Tyumen, in the Soviet Union's Russian Soviet Federated Socialist Republic (RSFSR) on 31 January 1971, crashed 13.6 km (8.5 mi) short of the runway on approach to Surgut International Airport, Surgut, RSFSR. An investigation found the aircraft's loss of control was caused by icing.

== Aircraft ==
The aircraft involved in the incident was an Antonov AN-12B with the aircraft registration number 12996 (Factory number - 00347403, a serial number giving some basic information about the aircraft: 00 for the last digit of the year of manufacture - 1970, 34 for the factory of origin - the Tashkent aviation factory, 74 for the production batch and 03 for the individual aircraft within that batch), this aircraft left the production line of the V. P. Chkalov Tashkent aviation production association on the 31st of August 1970 and handed over to the main directorate of the civil air fleet (the governmental organ tasked with overseeing aviation throughout the soviet union), which then sent the aircraft to the 2nd Tuman aviation department of the territorial directorate of the civil air fleet. At the time of the crash the aircraft had completed a total of 391 flying hours.

== Accident ==
CCCP-12996 was sent to transport goods from Tyumen to Surgut, the aircraft's load consisted of 12 metric tons of fresh seafood; Pacific herring packed in boxes. The aircraft was piloted by a crew from the 259th flying squadron, consisting of:

- Captain - Konstantin Ivanovich Adamovich
- Second officer - Viktor Pavlovich Ponomarov
- Navigator - Nikolai Mikhailovich Evlantev
- Flight mechanic - Yuri Aleksandrovich Isakov
- Radio operator - Anatoli Sergeyevich Andreyev
- Steward - Yevgeniy Vasilevich Trifonov

Also on board was a loadmaster. At 01:25 Moscow time the airliner took off from Tyumen airport and, after gaining height, occupied a flight level of 6,000 m (19,685.0 ft).

At Surgut the sky was fully covered by layered cloud down to an altitude of 240 m (787.4 ft), a fresh breeze was blowing from the South-South-West, visibility was 6 km (3.7 mi), the air temperature was −7 °C (19.4 °F). At 02:30 Moscow time and 120 km (74.6 mi) from their destination, the crew made radio contact with the radar controller at Surgut airport and received a weather report. When the AN-12 was 100 km (62.1 mi) away from Surgut the radar controller gave permission for the aircraft to descend to an altitude of 4,500 m (14,763.8 ft). Having achieved this new altitude and now at a distance of 80 km (49.7 mi) from the airfield, the crew transferred communication to the approach controller who gave permission to descend to an altitude of 1,200 m (3,937.0 ft). Whilst descending to this new altitude the crew switched over to the landing controller and at 02:34:30 reported reaching an altitude of 1,200 m (3,937.0 ft). In response the landing controller informed them that the landing would be at 180° and that the airfield pressure altitude was 766 millimetres of mercury. At this point the crew began to descend to the altitude of the airfield traffic pattern.

Passing through an altitude of 800–900 m (2,624.7–2,952.8 ft), the crew reported strong icing conditions and a minute later very strong icing conditions. The transcript of the crew's communications with the ground controllers records that the aircraft's de-icing system was switched on. At 02:37:12 the crew reported that they had descended to an altitude of 600 m (1,968.5 ft), a couple of minutes later at 02:39:35 the crew began the third turn (to the left) of the airfield traffic pattern at an altitude of 400 m (1,312.3 ft). 10-15 seconds before completing this turn the aircraft began to behave abnormally and at 02:40:25 someone in the cabin said "the engines are starting to shake". In this case it is highly likely that this shaking was caused by a condition close to flow separation on the wing of the aircraft. When the third turn was completed at 02:40:39, the captain gave the order to set the flaps to 15°, but 5 seconds later he was forced to give the command to return them to their previous position since the crew had noticed that the speed of the aircraft had dropped from 330 km/h (205.1 mph) to 310 km/h (192.6 mph), despite an increase in engine thrust.

When the AN-12 had exited the left turn, a few seconds later the aircraft again independently entered a slight left turn. The crew countered the left turn with a small steering input to the right, but were quickly forced to steer to the left and then back to the right again since the aircraft had begun to roll from side to side causing a decrease in lift and causing the aircraft to fall. At this point the aircraft was experiencing a force of 1.8 - 1.9g, at 02:41:04 Moscow time (04:41:04 local time) at a speed of 395 km/h (245.4 mph) and at a severe left hand tilt, the AN-12 crashed into the ground 16.5 km (10.3 mi) North of Surgut airport, close to one of the lakes in the area, the aircraft was completely destroyed and burst into flames. Part of the wreckage including the tail section fell into the lake. All 7 people on board were killed.

== Causes ==
The commission that investigated the accident concluded that:

The stall during the final approach immediately after completion of the third turn was the result of icing on the wing tips. The formation of ice on the wing was the result of incomplete opening of the air bleed valves from the engine and extreme icing conditions.

Other factors:

1. The inability of the crew to control the presence of ice on the wing and the open position of the air bleed valves from the engine.
2. Insufficiently clear recommendations for the use of the air bleed valves from the engine in icing conditions in the flight manual and the instructions for crews of the AN-12.
3. An absence of recommendations for flying in severe icing conditions

== Aftermath ==
In the span of 9 days (22nd and 31st of January 1971) two AN-12 aircraft crashed at Surgut, CCCP-11000 and CCCP-12996. Both crashes occurred under similar circumstances, whilst carrying out the third turn of their landing circuit both aircraft suffered spontaneous rolls due to flow separation on the wing caused by a drop in aerodynamics because of icing, which in turn was caused by ineffective de-icing systems since the hot air intake valve from the engine was not fully open. In order to prevent further catastrophes of the same nature significant improvements were made to the air bleed control systems including an indicator to show the fully open position of the valves. Special tests were also carried out, the results of which helped to clarify the aerodynamic characteristics of the AN-12 during icing. It also lead to changes in many civil aviation governing documents.
