= 22 January 1971 Surgut Aeroflot Antonov An-12 crash =

Aviation accident in the Soviet Union

1971 January 22 Surgut Aeroflot Antonov An-12 crash
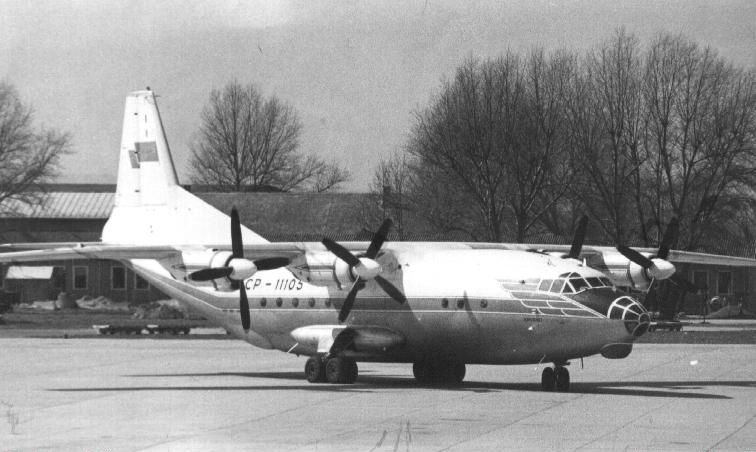
- Aeroflot Antonov An-12 registered CCCP-11105, sister ship to the aircraft involved in the accident

Accident
- Date: 22 January 1971
- Summary: Icing due to bleed air valves being closed
- Site: Surgut, RSFSR, Soviet Union; 61°20′36″N 73°24′12″E

Aircraft
- Aircraft type: Antonov An-12B
- Operator: Aeroflot (Komi UGA)
- Registration: CCCP-11000
- Flight origin: Omsk Tsentralny Airport (OMS/UNOO)
- Destination: Surgut International Airport (SGC/USRR)
- Passengers: 2
- Crew: 12
- Fatalities: 14
- Survivors: 0

The 22 January 1971 Surgut Aeroflot Antonov An-12 crash occurred when an Aeroflot Antonov An-12B, registered CCCP-11000, flying from Omsk Tsentralny Airport, in the Soviet Union's (RSFSR) on 22 January 1971, crashed 15 km (9.3 mi) short of the runway on approach to Surgut International Airport, Surgut, RSFSR. An investigation found the aircraft's ice protection system was ineffective because the engine bleed air valves were closed during the flight; ice therefore built up on the aircraft causing it to go out of control.

== Aircraft ==
The Antonov An-12B with registration CCCP-11000 and c/n 5343610 was manufactured by the Tashkent Aviation Plant on 3 December 1965 and by 2 February 1966 was handed over to the main directorate of the civil air fleet (the governmental organ tasked with overseeing aviation throughout the Soviet Union). The aircraft was then sent to the Syktyvkar aviation department of the Komi territorial directorate of the civil air fleet. At the time of the crash the aircraft had completed 5626 flying hours in total and 2578 landings.

== Accident ==
In the first half of January 1971 CCCP-11000 was one of two Antonov AN-12s which, along with 3 crews from the 75th flying squadron were temporarily based at Omsk airport, these aircraft were used in transporting freight. On January 22 an order was received to fly CCCP-11000 to Syktyvkar, where routine maintenance work was to be carried out on the aircraft. It was decided to combine the flight with the delivery of 12 metric tons of freight to Surgut. The goods to be transported consisted mainly of rolls of netting, plastic floor tiles and other household goods, as well as a C-995 piledriver for use in construction. Aboard were two crews, the flight crew and a relief crew. The flight crew consisted of:

- Captain - Sergei Alexeyavich Bakharev
- Second officer - Anatoli Petrovich Dekhtarenko
- Navigator - Valeriy Konstantinovich Bakhin
- Flight mechanic-instructor - Mikhail Ivanovich Kazachkov
- Radio operator - Anatoli Antonidovich Tichenko
- Steward - Vladimir Mikhayilovich Malinin

The relief crew consisted of:

- Captain - Leontiy Andreyevich Butov
- Second officer - Anatoliy Mikhailovich Shama
- Navigator - Pyotr Stepanovich Azarenkov
- Flight mechanic - Anatoliy Mikhailovich Udayev
- Radio operator - Nikolai Ivanovich Soklakov
- Steward - Igor Ivanovich Pushnikov

Two others were also on board: an engineer from the 75th flying squadron; Nikolai Pavlovich Kayakan and loadmaster; Yevgeniya Rudolfovna Kramar. At Surgut, according to the weather forecast provided to the crew, there were Stratocumulus clouds at a height of 500–700 m (1,640.4–2,296.6 ft), visibility was 3–4 km (1.9–2.5 mi), there was snow, with icing conditions in the clouds. After take-off at 18:09 Moscow time from Omsk airport the AN-12 climbed to a flight level of 6,600 m (21,653.5 ft).

At Surgut there was solid cloud at a height of 450 m (1,476.4 ft) , visibility was 5.5 km (3.4 mi), a fresh breeze was blowing from the north and the air temperature was −9 °C (15.8 °F). At 19:20 the radar controller at Surgut gave permission for the crew of the An-12 to descend to a height of 4,500 m (14,763.8 ft), and then to a height of 1,200 m (3,937.0 ft). When the crew reported that they had reached a height of 1,200 m (3,937.0 ft), they were ordered to contact landing control. They approached the runway on a magnetic heading of 180° and the aircraft entered the second turn of its circuit whilst descending to a height of 400 m (1,312.3 ft), the distance to the runway at this point was 11 km (6.8 mi). At 19:34 Moscow time the crew reported that they were passing the outer marker beacon at a height of 400 m (1,312.3 ft), which was acknowledged by the controller. At 19:36 Moscow time (21:36 local time), the aircraft was 11 km (6.8 mi) laterally and 16 km (9.9 mi) radially from the runway. The crew received the order to perform the third turn of their holding pattern, this instruction was acknowledged by the crew. This was the last communication that took place with the aircraft.

When the An-12 was at a distance of 18 km (11.2 mi)to the North-East of Surgut airport at a speed of 330 km/h (205.1 mph) conducting a left turn, the aircraft experienced flow separation on the wing as a result of which it entered a progressive left turn and lost altitude. At this point, having deviated from its original course by 110°, and now on a bearing of 40° and with a left bank around 90° the aircraft crashed into the ground in the vicinity of the river Pochekuika and was completely destroyed with the wreckage catching fire.

== Causes ==
According to an analysis of the weather conditions there was severe icing conditions at an altitude of 400–1,300 m (1,312.3–4,265.1 ft). Severe icing conditions at 1,200 m (3,937.0 ft) were also reported by the crew of CCCP-12996, another An-12 involved in a very similar crash at the same airfield just 9 days later.

The conclusion of the commission: The aircraft suffered a stall at the third turn due to a sharp deterioration in its aerodynamics as a consequence of icing on the wing whilst flying through severe icing conditions, and also due to an inappropriate speed given for the third and fourth turns for an aircraft weighing 55 tons and with icing on the wings. Icing on the wings occurred due to insufficient heating of the leading edge of the wing resulting from incomplete opening of the air bleed valves from the engine.

Other factors:

1. A lack of flight testing on the behavior of the aircraft with wing icing and a lack of recommendations to the crew for flying in such conditions.
2. A lack of data on the effectiveness of the aircraft's wing anti-icing system during intensive icing conditions.

== Aftermath ==
In the span of 9 days (22nd and 31st of January 1971) two An-12 aircraft crashed at Surgut, CCCP-11000 and CCCP-12996. Both crashes occurred under similar circumstances, whilst carrying out the third turn of their landing circuit both aircraft suffered spontaneous rolls due to flow separation on the wing caused by a drop in aerodynamics because of icing, which in turn was caused by ineffective de-icing systems since the hot air intake valve from the engine was not fully open. In order to prevent further catastrophes of the same nature significant improvements were made to the air bleed control systems including an indicator to show the fully open position of the valves. Special tests were also carried out, the results of which helped to clarify the aerodynamic characteristics of the An-12 during icing. It also lead to changes in many civil aviation governing documents.
