= Nihon N-70 Cygnus =

N-70 Cygnus
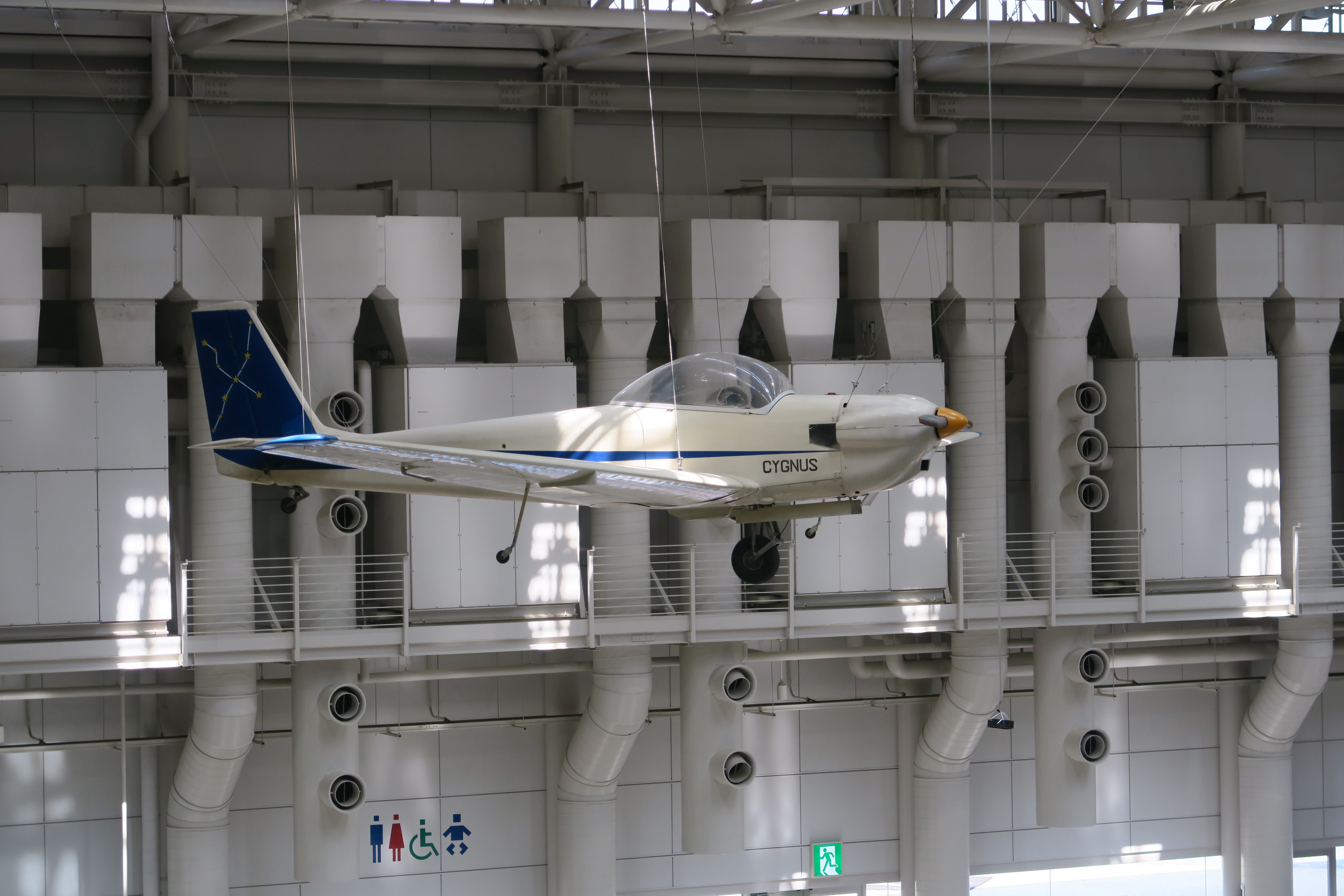

General information
- Type: Single-seat powered sailplane
- National origin: Japan
- Manufacturer: Nihon University
- Number built: 1

History
- First flight: 16 December 1971

The Nihon N-70 Cygnus is a 1970s Japanese single-seat powered sailplane designed and built by the College of Science and Technology at the Nihon University.

== Design and development ==
Design of the Cygnus started in April 1970 in the Department of Mechanical Engineering, building the aircraft started in June 1970, the Cygnus flew for the first time on 16 December 1971.

The Cygnus is a cantilever low-wing monoplane with a single spar wooden wing with plywood and aircraft fabric covering, the fuselage is an oval-section semi-monocoque structure covered in plywood. It is powered by a 44 hp (33 kW) Fuji motor car engine with a two-bladed fixed-pitch wooden propeller. The pilot has an enclosed cockpit with a transparent one-piece canopy. The Cygnus has a forward retracting single main wheel, an auxiliary balance wheel below each wing and a non-retractable tailwheel.

== Specifications ==
Data from Jane's All the World's Aircraft 1973-74

General characteristics

- Crew: 1
- Length: 6.90 m (22 ft 7.75 in)
- Wingspan: 15 m (49 ft 2.5 in)
- Height: 1.75 m (5 ft 9 in)
- Wing area: 15.00 m^{2} (161.5 sq ft)
- Aspect ratio: 15
- Empty weight: 343 kg (756 lb)
- Gross weight: 460 kg (1,014 lb)
- Powerplant: 1 × Fuji 100-EA61 1100cc water-cooled motor-car engine , 33 kW (44 hp)

Performance

- Maximum speed: 160 km/h (99 mph, 86 kn)
- Stall speed: 70 km/h (44 mph, 38 kn)
- Range: 480 km (298 mi, 259 nmi)
- Maximum glide ratio: 25
