= List of Antonov An-12 variants =

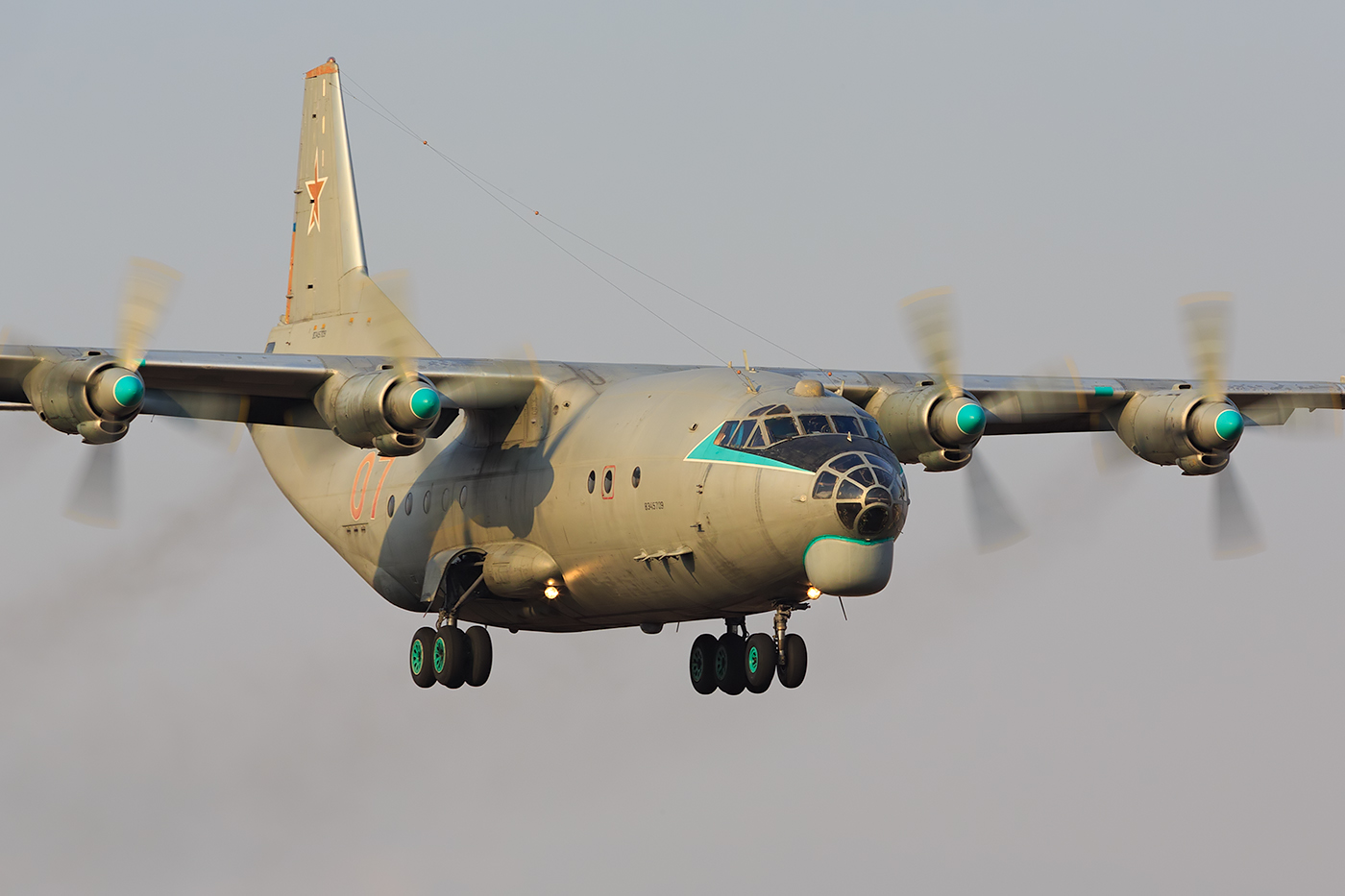
An Antonov An-12 aircraft of Russian Air Force landing at Vladivostok Airport

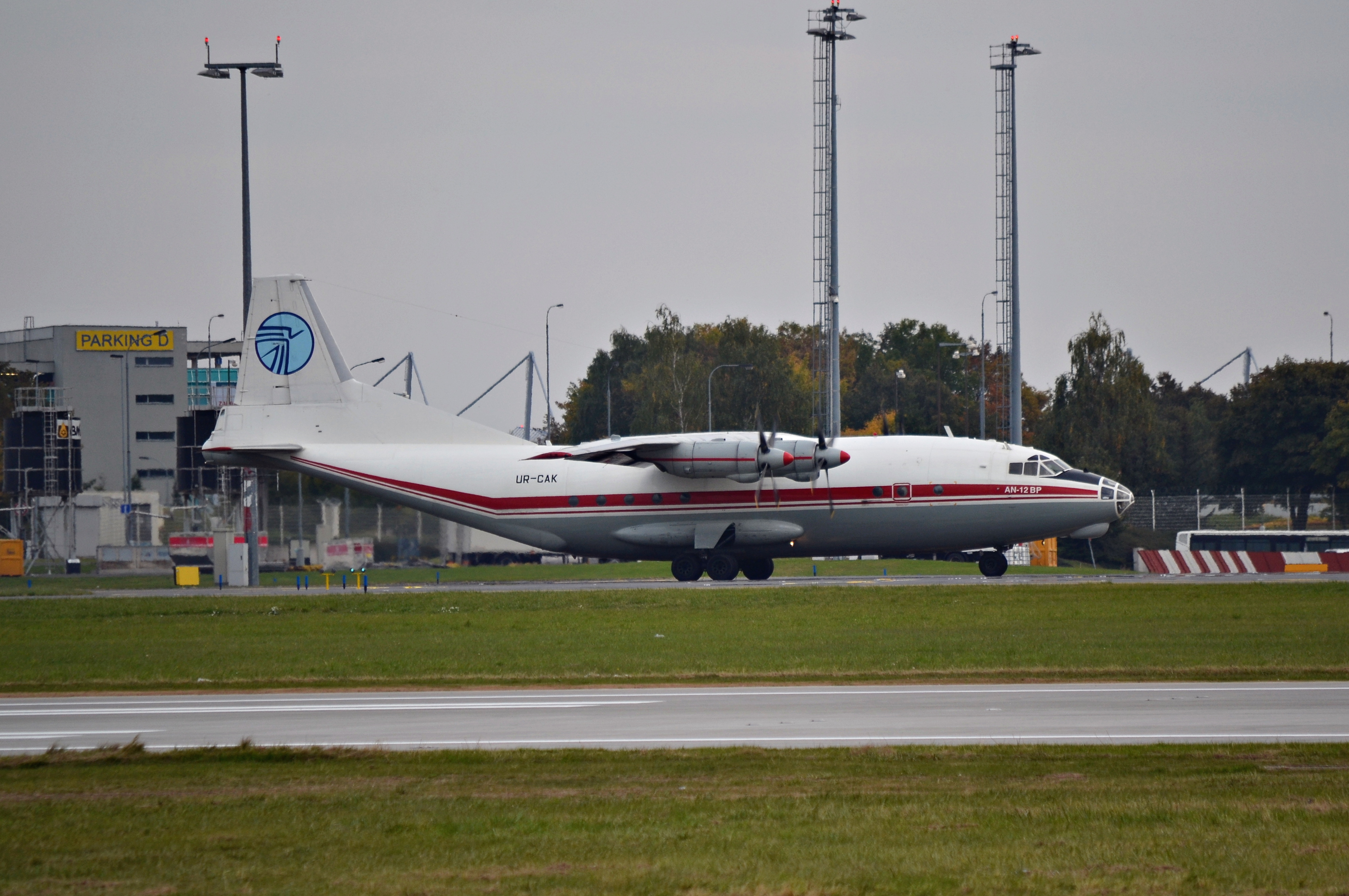
An Antonov An-12 aircraft (registration UR-CAK) of Ukraine Air Alliance at Václav Havel Airport Prague, Czech Republic (PRG)

The Antonov An-12 is a four-engined turboprop transport aircraft designed and produced by Antonov. It was produced in many customized variants for uses within the country and for exports.

The aircraft was used for military purposes, in emergency situations, for the transfer of military equipment and personnel, as well as for passenger and cargo transportation, search and rescue of space objects, spacecraft crews, and aircraft in distress.

== List of variants ==
=== Mass production type ===
An-12
Cantilever monoplane of all-metal construction with an upper wing, single-keel vertical tail and retractable landing gear. Initially produced military transport model, powered by 4,000 hp (3,000 kW) Ivchenko AI-20A engines.

An-12A
First serial modification. An improved model with four additional fuel cells in the inner wing panels and 4,250 hp (3,170 kW) AI-20K engines. Subsequently, the aircraft received underfloor fuel tanks and began to be designated An-12AP.

An-12AD
One Tashkent-built An-12 (CCCP-11528 No.2) was delivered as An-12AD, with no known reason for the suffix.

An-12AP
Modified An-12A, fitted with two extra underfloor tanks of An-12P.

An-12B
Further improved, with detachable outer wings and integral fuel tank housing (1,390 L (310 imp gal; 370 US gal)), reinforced wing to support the extra fuel weight, a separate Flight Engineer station, more powerful cargo-handling winches and a TG-16 APU in the port undercarriage fairing, which necessitated the removal of rear bomb pylons from the undercarriage fairings. Power was supplied by Ivchenko AI-20M engines with improved reliability and at the same rating as that of the AI-20K. Some An-12B aircraft were built at the factories as commercial transports with all military or sensitive equipment removed and with the designation for the aircraft unchanged.

An-12B (LIAT)
(Laboratoriya Issledovaniya Aviatsionnoy Tekniki – aviation hardware examination laboratory) : In 1972 a single An-12B was converted to a flying accident investigation laboratory, fitted with equipment for investigating crashes, analyzing accidents and voice recording systems.

An-12B-30
A planned 30-tonne (66,140 lb) payload version of the An-12B. To be powered by 5,180 hp (3,860 kW) AI-20DK engines.

An-12B-I
(Individooal'naya [zashchita] – individual protection) : Electronic countermeasures version with the Fasol (String Bean) active jamming system. Only seven aircraft were built/converted.

An-12BK
(Kompleks – avionics) : An increased 30-tonne (66,140 lb) payload, improved avionics suite, TG-16M APU and the widened cargo door of the An-12BP characterized the An-12BK, which was built exclusively for the VTA.

An-12BK-IS
(Individooahl'naya zaschita s sistemoy Seeren – individual protection active jammer Siren) : 40 An-12BKs were built as ECM platforms with Fasol and Sirena mission systems housed in four pods suspended from pylons either side of the lower forward fuselage and either side of the gunner's position. Formation-keeping equipment was housed under a dielectric panel on the flight deck escape hatch. From 1974 another 105 aircraft were modified with the Bar'yer – (barrier) and Siren systems as well as automatic infra-red jammers.

An-12BK-PPS
(Postanovchik Pomekh Siren) : Evolved from the An-12PP, this ECM platform variant was equipped with the Sirena system in four pods, Booket jammer system and chaff dispensers in the tailcone. Later-production aircraft had the chaff dispensers relocated to the cargo door. Nineteen aircraft were converted from An-12BKs, serving with the VVS until at least 2006. Three aircraft are known to have been stripped of mission equipment and returned to transport duties.

An-12BKTs
"Cyclone" - a laboratory for the study of meteorological processes. In 1979, 2 An-12BKs were converted.

An-12BKK
Kapsoola – capsule : A single aircraft converted to a VIP transport for the VTA in 1975. The name Kapsoola refers to the pressurised cabin Capsule.

An-12BKSh
(Shturmanskij) : Navigator Trainer version of the An-12BK with ten trainee workstations.

An-12BKT
(BKToplivovoz – BK tanker) In 1972 the An-12 BKT was produced as a flying petrol station for refueling aircraft in austere environments on the ground, capable of refueling two aircraft at a time with a transferable load of 19,500 L (4,300 imp gal; 5,200 US gal).

An-12BKV
Military variant that could be used to drop bombs or mines using a permanently installed conveyor belt for dropping the weapons from the cargo hold door. Accuracy was found to be appalling so further development was cancelled.

An-12BL
(Laboratornyj) Test-platform for the Kh-28 anti-radiation missile, with two missiles carried on pylons either side of the forward fuselage and two more suspended from pylons under the outer wings. This variant may have been intended for an operational role as a SEAD (Suppression of Enemy Air Defences) platform.

An-12BM
(Molniya – Lightning) A single An-12B converted to a SATCOM relay aircraft for trials relaying communications to and from the Molniya-1 communications satellite.

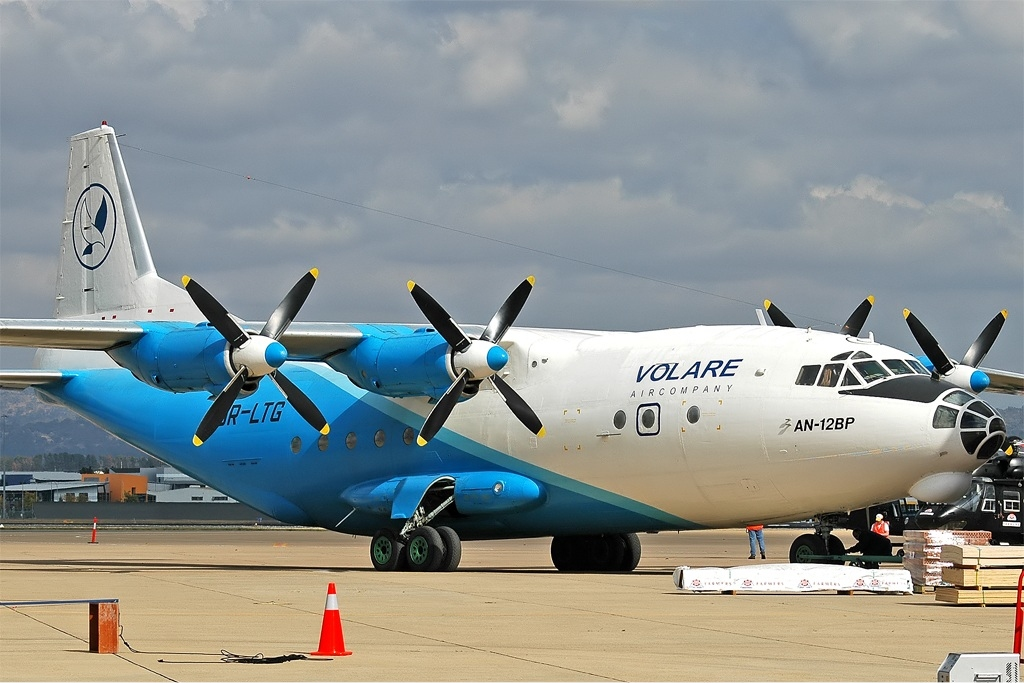
A Volare Airlines Antonov An-12BP at Canberra Airport

An-12BP
An-12B fitted with the two extra underfloor tanks of the An-12P, equipped with a NAS-1B1-28 (Navigatsionnaya Avtonomnaya Sistema – self-contained navigation system) and RSKM-2 (Rahdiolokatsionnaya Sistema Kontrolya Mesta – radio co-ordinate monitoring system). Later-production An-12BPs were built with a wider cargo door and revised cabin windows placement. Some An-12BP aircraft were built at the factories as commercial transports with all military or sensitive equipment removed, the designation for these aircraft was unchanged.

An-12BPTs
(Tsiklon – Cyclone) Two Tashkent-built An-12BP aircraft (CCCP-11530 and CCCP-11531) were converted at the factory as weather research laboratories. Mission equipment consisted of a measurement suite, a data recording suite and cloud seeding equipment. Both aircraft were subsequently stripped of their mission equipment reverting to transport duties.

An-12BSh
(Shturmanskij – for navigators) Navigator Trainer version of the An-12B with ten trainee workstations.

An-12BSM
An improved commercial variant intended to carry standardised freight pallets. The meaning of the BSM suffix is unclear.

An-12BZ-1
In 1969 Antonov proposed IFR tanker and receiver variants of the An-12B. The An-12BZ-1 was the tanker with a single podded refueling hose/drogue unit.

An-12BZ-2
In 1969 Antonov proposed IFR tanker and receiver variants of the An-12B. The An-12BZ-2 was the receiver aircraft with a fixed probe above the cockpit.

An-12D
Developed from 1964 as an increased-payload version with new undercarriage, new tail unit similar to the Antonov An-24 and a fully pressurised fuselage of increased length and width, incorporating a loading ramp in a cargo hold door. This project was not proceeded with but led to the An-40 STOL Transport.

An-12DK
A planned version powered by 5,500 hp (4,100 kW) Ivchenko AI-30 turboprop engines.

An-12D-UPS
(Oopravleniye Pogranichnym Sloyem – BLC [boundary layer control]) A BLC variant of the proposed An-12D, with two turbo-compressors above the centre of the wing section, feeding compressed air to the slots on the wing, and a third in the fin fillet feeding compressed air to slots on the tail surfaces.

An-12M
(Modifitseerovannyy – modified) Was a standard-production aircraft fitted with 5,180 hp (3,860 kW) AI-20DM turboprop engines. Despite higher performance, the production was stopped due to the discontinuation of the AI-20DM engines.

An-12P
([dopolinitel'nyye bahki]Pod polom) Initial-production An-12 fitted with two additional fuel tanks under the cargo hold floor.

An-12PL
(Polyarny, Lyzhnyy – Polar ski-equipped) Two aircraft converted with fixed ski undercarriage, heavily insulated hold and flight deck, powerful onboard heater for the cabin and engines, and the underfloor tanks of the 'An-12BP Polar'.

An-12PP
(Postanovchik Pomekh) (a.k.a. An-12BK-PP) An Electronic Countermeasures version developed in 1970 to operate within large formations of regular An-12 transports providing ECM for the whole formation. The automatic system identifies air defense radars and jams signals in their direction. The active Booket (bouquet) jammers radiated from three blisters under the fuselage and the tail gunners position was fitted with ASO-24 (Avtomaht Sbrosa Otrazhately – automatic chaff dispenser) chaff dispensers with the chaff cut to length as determined by the frequency of the radar detected. Three pairs of heat exchangers were fitted on the forward fuselage sides providing cooling for the mission equipment, and a fourth pair above the main gear fairings. 27 aircraft were converted from An-12BK aircraft, with at least two aircraft completed with only the chaff dispensers and non-standard rod aerials on the forward fuselage. At least two An-12PP aircraft were de-militarised and sold to civilian owners retaining the distinctive ogival tailcone.

An-12PS
(Poiskovo-Spasatel’nyi) SAR version of the An-12B with Istok-Golub emergency UHF homing system, with Yorsh (Ruff) or Gagara (Loon) rescue boats, as well as droppable inflatable liferafts and crews for the boats. Several aircraft were used for recovering Cosmonauts from sea landings. Others were operated by the AV-MF.

An-12R
(Reaktivnny – jet boosted) A design project for a jet-powered An-12 with a radically altered swept wing and tail and 25-tonne (55,153 lb) payload carried for 2,500 km (1,600 mi), to have been powered by four Lotarev D-36 high-bypass turbofans. This projected aircraft latter evolved into the Antonov An-112.

An-12R
([samolyot] Razvedchik – reconnaissance aircraft) The unconfirmed probable designation for the small number of ELINT aircraft operated by the VVS from 1970. These aircraft were fitted with mission equipment in dielectric fairings forward of the main undercarriage wells and additional blade aerials above the forward fuselage and two blade aerials under the forward fuselage. Two aircraft are known to have operated without the blade aerials.

An-12RR
(Rahdiatsionnyy Razvedchik – radiation reconnaissance) Nuclear Biological and Chemical warfare reconnaissance aircraft. At least three aircraft equipped with RR8311-100 air sampling pods on special cradles either side of the forward fuselage. Two of these aircraft are known to have also been equipped with a toxic agent detector pod on the starboard fuselage side.

An-12RU
A planned JATO (Jet-Assisted Take-Off) version of the An-12, to be fitted with two jettisonable PRD-63 solid-propellant rocket boosters fitted either side of the aft fuselage.

An-12SN
([samolyot] Spetsiahl'novo Naznacheniya – special-mission [aircraft]) To enable the Soviet Army's T-54 main battle tank to be airlifted, Antonov designed the An-12SN with a cargo hold increased in width from 3 to 3.45 m (9 ft 10 in to 11 ft 4 in), powered by 5,180 hp (3,860 kW) AI-20DK engines boosted by a 3,800 kg thrust (8,380lbst) Mikulin RD-9 turbojet installed at the base of the fin in place of the gunners station. The Antonov An-22 was found to be more suitable for airlifting T-54s, so further work on the An-12SN was abandoned.

An-12T
(Toplivovoz – tanker) A fuel tanker variant used to transport fuel for automobiles or aircraft, or rocket fuels and oxidisers. Special tanks were fitted in the hold as required.

An-12TP-2
A single An-12B (CCCP-04366) was custom-built for long-range transport and geophysical survey duties in Antarctica. The aircraft was fitted with a long under-nose radome, an MAD (Magnetic Anomaly Detector) boom extending from the gunner's position and mission equipment in the insulated cabin. On arrival in Antarctica a ski undercarriage, as used on the An-12PL, was fitted.

An-12T Mystery Designations
Suffixes starting with 'T' which have unknown meaning. Aircraft with these suffixes were delivered from the Voronezh and Tashkent factories to both military and civil customers without obvious reason for the 'T'.
- An-12TA
- An-12TB
- An-12TBP
- An-12TBK

An-12U
(Oopravleniye [Pogranichnym sloyem] – BLC) In 1962 a BLC (boundary layer control) version of the An-12 was projected with simple flaps replacing the double-slotted Fowler flaps and compressed air supplied by two DK1-26 compressors in underwing pods. It was envisaged that the use of JATO would dramatically improve the field performance.

An-12UD
(Oovelichennoy Dahl'nosti – with increased range) An interim extended-range variant fitted with two (An-12UD) auxiliary tanks, acquired from Myasishchev M-4 bombers, in the freight hold. The prototype was converted from Irkutsk-built An-12 c/n 9901007.

An-12UD-3
(Oovelichennoy Dahl'nosti – with increased range) An interim extended-range variant fitted with three (An-12UD-3) auxiliary tanks, acquired from Myasishchev M-4 bombers, in the freight hold. Converted from Tashkent-built c/n 3341007.

An-12VKP
"Zebra" (Vozdushnij Kommandnij Punkt – Airborne command post) A single Irkutsk-built An-12A (c/n 9900902) was converted into an airborne command post. Three cigar-shaped fairings were carried at the wing-tips and fin-tip, other equipment were housed in long fairings either side of the rear fuselage and a war room was situated in the pressurised fuselage. Due to the superior performance of the Ilyushin Il-22 Zebra airborne command post, the An-12VKP was discontinued.

An-40
Planned version, derived directly from the An-12D, would've been powered by four 55,000 hp (41,000 kW) AI-30 turboprop engines and four 2,550kgp (5,260 lb-st) Kolesov RD-36-35 booster/brake engines, fitted with thrust reversers, in paired nacelles between the inner and outer turboprop engines. A full-scale mock-up was completed in 1965 but the VVS selected the larger and faster Ilyushin Il-76 for production instead.

An-40PLO
An anti-submarine warfare variant of the proposed An-40, to be powered by mixed-fuel engines burning kerosene and liquid hydrogen.

An-42
A version of the An-40 fitted with BLC (Boundary Layer Control). Compressed air for the BLC slots was provided by three turbo-compressors, derived from the Kolesov RD36-35 turbojet, in fairings above the wing centre-section.

An-12 gunship
A close air support variant of the An-12, armed with two 57-mm guns, smaller caliber guns and automatic grenade launchers, similar to the American AC-130. In 2021, it was announced that the gunship will not be based on the An-12 after all, as it did not meet the requirements for a "flying gunner.

=== Other variants ===
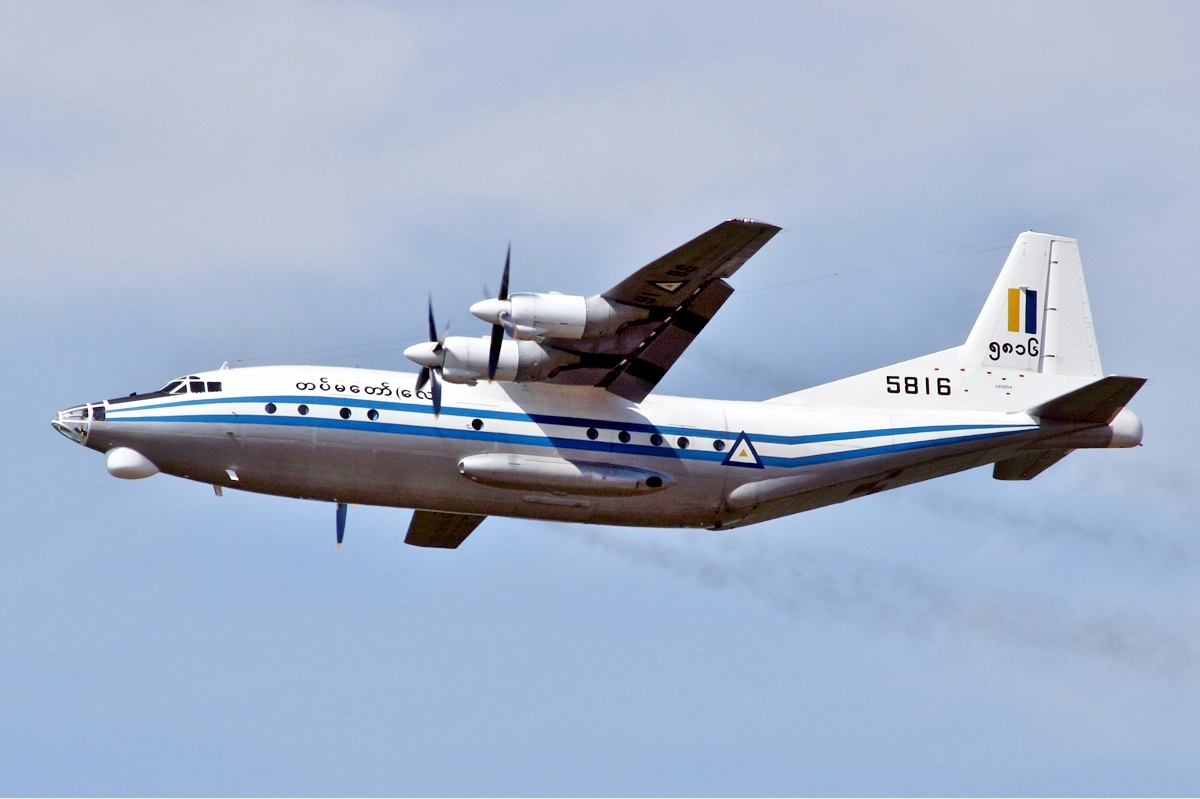
Shaanxi Y-8 of the Myanmar Air Force.

Shaanxi Y-8
Unlicensed Chinese copy of the An-12BP.

Shaanxi Y-9
Based on modern Y-8F, the only An-12 successor.

Sever ACV
In 1983 professor V.Ignat'yev proposed the use of time-expired An-12 aircraft as the basis of an air-cushion vehicle for use in the far north of the USSR. Although the project was supported by the Kuibyshev Aviation Institute, suitable airframes for conversion were not available and the project came to naught.

An-12 ballistic missile transporter
In 1962, a single Irkutsk-built An-12 (c/n 1901507) was converted to carry ballistic missiles to their launch sites. Due to the limited types of missile that could be carried and the lack of precautions for oxidiser leaks, this version was not produced further.

An-12 with underwing tanks and IFR probe
Another projected IFR (in-flight refuelling) version with two 6,000 L (1,300 imp gal; 1,600 US gal) tanks suspended from pylons between the inner and outer engines and an IFR probe above the cockpit.

An-12A communications relay aircraft
At least seven Voronezh-built An-12As converted as communications relay aircraft, fitted with a second TA-6 APU in the tailcone. The actual role and mission equipment fitted is unknown.

An-12AP
Magnitometr/Relikt geophysical survey aircraft. An-12AP CCCP-12186 was a survey aircraft developed for the Leningrad branch of the Earth Magnetism Institute and converted at the Soviet Navy 20th Aircraft Overhaul Plant at Pushkin near Leningrad. The aircraft was equipped with a MAD boom extending from the gunner's position and an L-14MA astro-navigation system in a structure sticking up from the MAD boom, as well as a camera mounted on the rear cargo door.

An-12B instrumentation calibration laboratory
(a.k.a. Izdeliye 93T) To enable special instruments and measuring devices to be calibrated in isolated parts of the country a single An-12B was equipped with a full calibration laboratory in the cargo hold.

An-12BP Polar support
To support Polar research stations in the Russian Arctic and Antarctica, this variant had three bladder fuel tanks, holding 9,800 L (2,200 imp gal; 2,600 US gal) of fuel, installed in the under-floor baggage holds to increase the range to 6,000 km (3,200 nmi; 3,700 mi).

An-12BK SAR variant
A little known search and rescue variant fitted with the Istok-Golob (Source [of a river] /Dove) emergency UHF radio homing system (similar to the western SARBE system).

=== Prototype/planning type ===
An-12 testbeds
There were a large number of different flying test-beds based on the An-12 with most of them not receiving separate suffix designations.
