= Aerolift =

South African airline (2002–09)

IATA	ICAO	Call sign
-	-	-
- Founded: 2002
- Ceased operations: 2009
- Headquarters: Johannesburg, South Africa
- Website: http://www.aerolift.org/ (defunct)

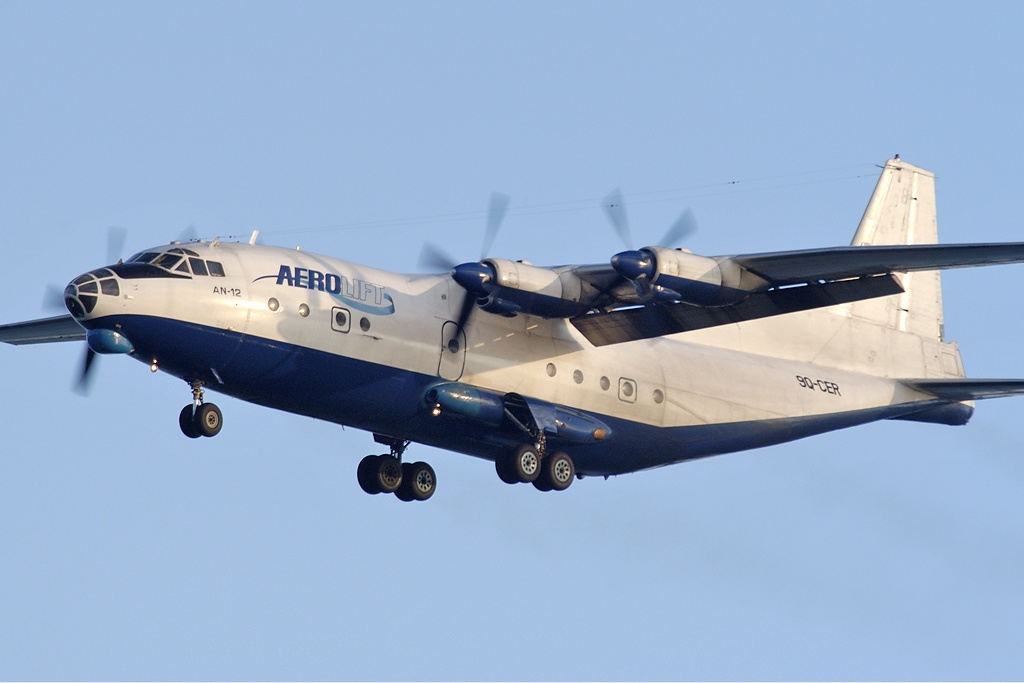
Aerolift Antonov An-12

Aerolift was a South African airline based in Bryanston, Gauteng, Johannesburg, operating chartered passenger and cargo flights within Africa using Soviet-built aircraft. Aerolift also offered aircraft lease services. The airline was launched in 2002 and shut down in 2009 following two fatal accidents that had occurred in the same year.

== Fleet ==
Upon closure, the Aerolift fleet included the following aircraft:

- 1 Antonov An-12
- 1 Antonov An-26
- 1 Antonov An-32
- 1 Antonov An-72
- 1 Antonov An-124
- 1 Ilyushin Il-76
- 1 Lockheed Tristar

== Accidents and incidents ==
- On 20 February 2009, an Aerolift Antonov An-12 crashed upon take-off at Luxor International Airport, Egypt due to an engine fire, killing all five crew members on board.
- On March 9, 2009 Aerolift Ilyushin Il-76 S9-SAB crashed into Lake Victoria just after takeoff from Entebbe Airport, Uganda, killing all 11 people on board. Two of the engines had caught fire on take-off. The aircraft had been chartered by DynCorp on behalf of AMISOM. The accident was investigated by Uganda's Ministry of Transport, which concluded that all four engines were time-expired and that Aerolift's claim that maintenance had been performed which extended their service live and that the work had been certified could not be substantiated.
