= Aerolift Flight 1015 =

2009 plane crash in Luxor, Egypt

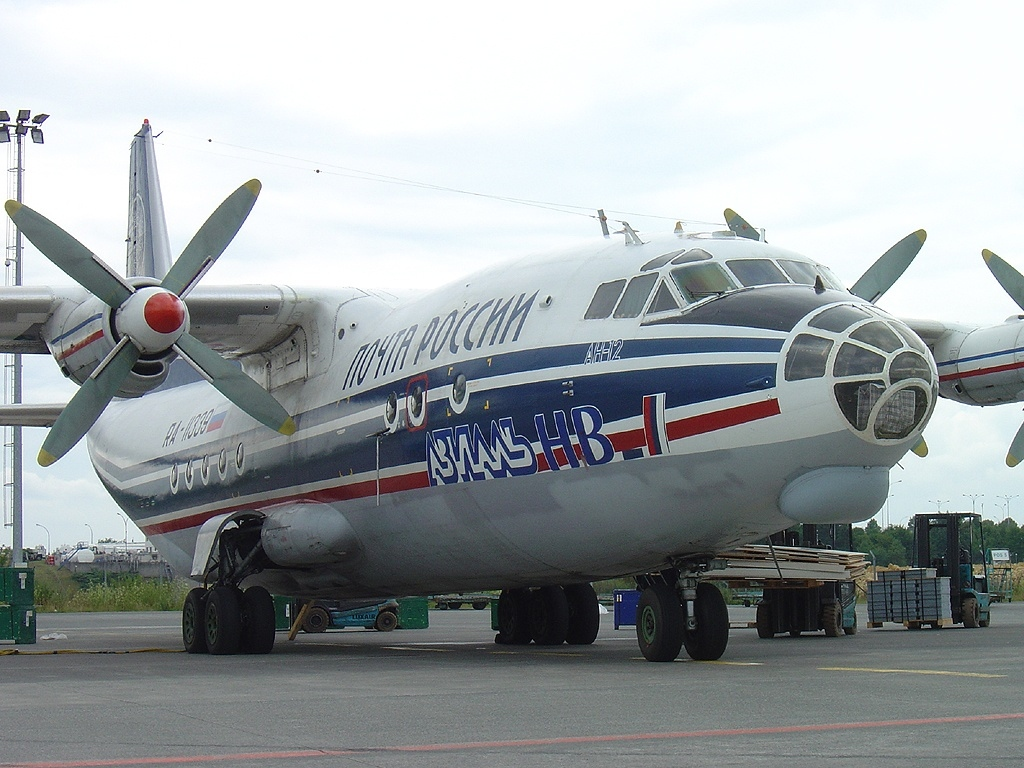
- The aircraft involved in the accident, photographed in 2004 while in service with Avial NV

Accident
- Date: February 20, 2009
- Summary: Crashed due to faulty maintenance
- Site: Luxor International Airport, Egypt

Aircraft
- Aircraft type: Antonov An-12B
- Operator: Aerolift
- Registration: S9-SVN
- Flight origin: Entebbe International Airport, Uganda
- Stopover: Luxor International Airport, Egypt
- Destination: Mykolaiv Airport, Ukraine
- Occupants: 5
- Passengers: 0
- Crew: 5
- Fatalities: 5
- Survivors: 0

Aerolift Flight 1015 was an unscheduled flight operated by Aerolift from Luxor International Airport in Egypt to Mykolaiv Airport in Ukraine. On February 20, 2009, the Antonov An-12B crashed shortly after takeoff. All five people on board the Antonov were killed in the incident.

== Aircraft and occupants ==
The aircraft used in the flight was a 43-year-old Soviet-made Antonov An-12B, which had its first flight in 1966. The machine bore the factory number 6344310. The four-engine transport aircraft was equipped with four Ivchenko AI-20 turboprop engines. In post-Soviet times, the aircraft was initially operated by the airline Avial NV and subsequently by the Russian Post, each with the aircraft registration RA11339. The aircraft was registered with an aircraft registration number from São Tomé and Príncipe (S9-SVN). The aircraft's registration had expired four years earlier – meaning it was being operated illegally. The aircraft belonged to Aerolift. There was a crew of five on board, one of whom was from Russia and two each from Ukraine and Belarus.

== Flight path and accident sequence ==
The aircraft was on a ferry flight from Kisangani via Entebbe in Uganda to Mykolaiv in Ukraine. During the journey, the fuel gauge showed a significantly lower fuel level than would have been expected. The aircraft ran out of kerosene during its stopover in Luxor, Egypt. During the inspection of the aircraft, a fuel leak was discovered, indicating that fuel had become scarce during the flight. A mechanic advised the pilots against continuing to fly the aircraft and recommended that they keep the Antonov grounded until repairs could be carried out. The captain refused and requested that the aircraft be refueled. After refueling, the Antonov lined up for takeoff. The pilots received clearance to take off from runway 20. The machine accelerated and took off. An eyewitness reported that the aircraft climbed noticeably slowly after takeoff. One engine caught fire, and the fire quickly spread to other parts of the aircraft. The Antonov crashed approximately 700 meters beyond the runway, next to a military base. The aircraft caught fire and was destroyed. All five crew members were killed. The tail section was still recognizable, but the fuselage and wings were lying 10 meters away and were completely burned out. Because it was located within the military's area of operation, access to the crash site was blocked. Due to its proximity to military buildings, taking pictures of the crash site was prohibited.

== Aftermath ==
Aerolift ceased operations later that same year.

== See also ==
- Aerolift
- Fuel starvation and fuel exhaustion
