= Avial (disambiguation) =

Avial is an Indian vegetable curry dish made from a mixture of vegetables including drumsticks, elephant yam, carrot, and beans with coconut, coconut oil, and curry leaves.

Avial (alternatively, Aviyal) may also refer to:

- Avial (band), Indian band
- Avial NV, defunct Russian airline
- Aviyal (2016 film). 2016 Indian Tamil-language anthology film
- Aviyal (2022 film), 2022 Indian film
