= Luxor International Airport =

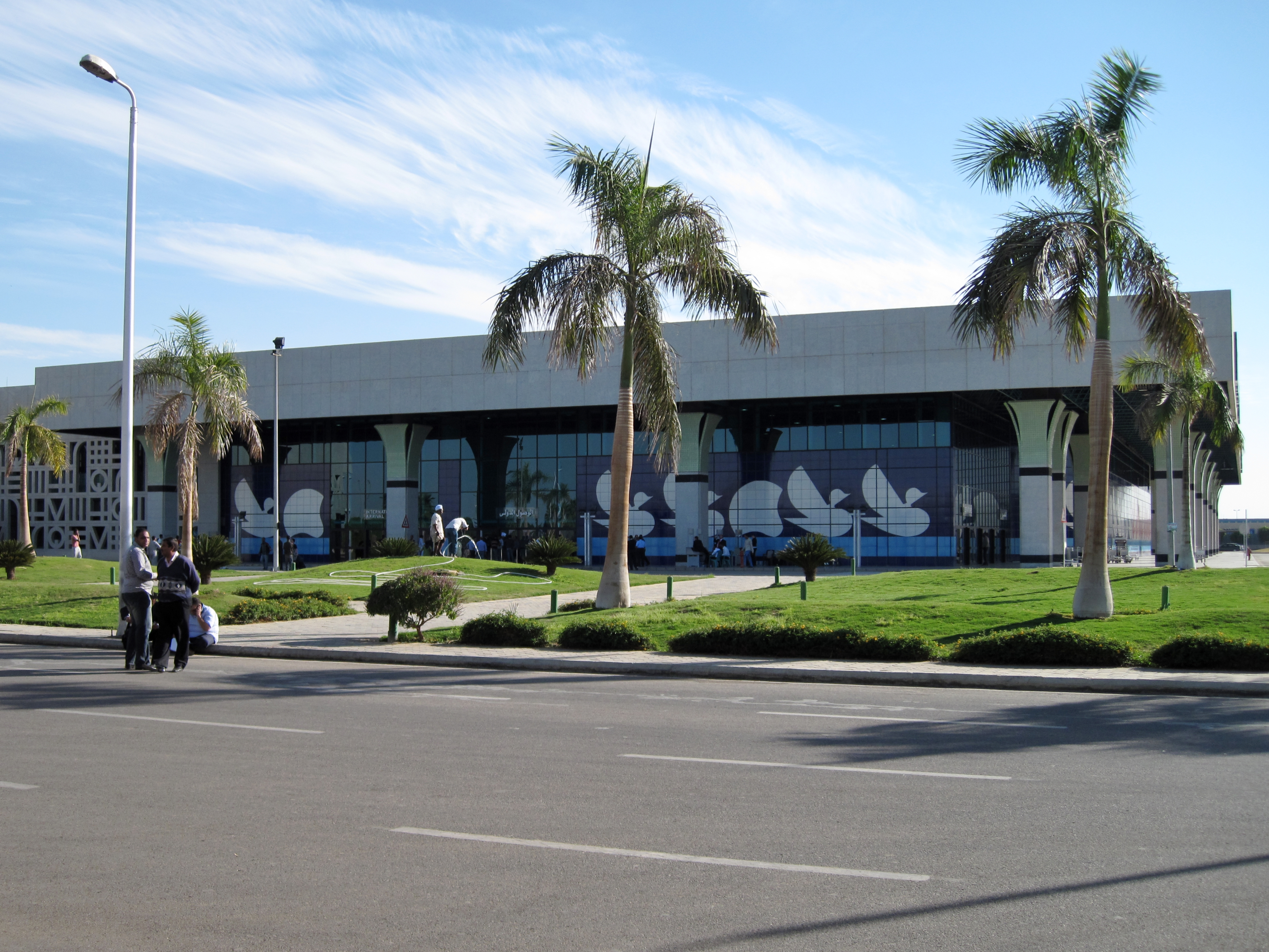
- IATA: LXR; ICAO: HELX

Summary
- Airport type: Public, Military
- Operator: Egyptian Airport Company
- Serves: Luxor, Egypt
- Elevation AMSL: 294 ft (90 m)
- Coordinates: 25°40′15″N 32°42′23″E
- Website: https://airport-luxor.com

Map
- Location of airport in Egypt

Runways
| Direction | Length | | Surface |
| Direction | m | ft | Surface |
|---|---|---|---|
| 02/20 | 3,000 | 9,843 | Asphalt |
- Sources: Airport web site and DAFIF

Luxor International Airport (IATA: LXR, ICAO: HELX) is the main airport serving the city of Luxor, Egypt. It is located 6 km (4 miles) east of the city. Many charter airlines use the airport, as it is a popular tourist destination for those visiting the River Nile and the Valley of the Kings.

== Facilities ==
In 2005, the airport was upgraded to accommodate up to 8 million passengers a year. Facilities for passengers include 48 check-in desks, 8 gates, 5 baggage claim belts, a post office, a bank, a Bureau de change, an auto exchange machine (CIB), restaurants, cafeterias, a VIP Lounge, a duty-free shop, a newsagent/tobacconist, a chemist shop, a gift shop, a travel agency, a tourist help desk, car rental, first aid, a baby/parent Room, disabled access/facilities and a business centre.

Facilities for cargo include refrigerated storage, animal quarantine, livestock handling, health officials, X-Ray equipment, and fumigation equipment. The cargo terminal handling agent for the airport is EgyptAir Cargo.

== Airlines and destinations ==
The following airlines operate regular scheduled and charter flights at Luxor Airport:

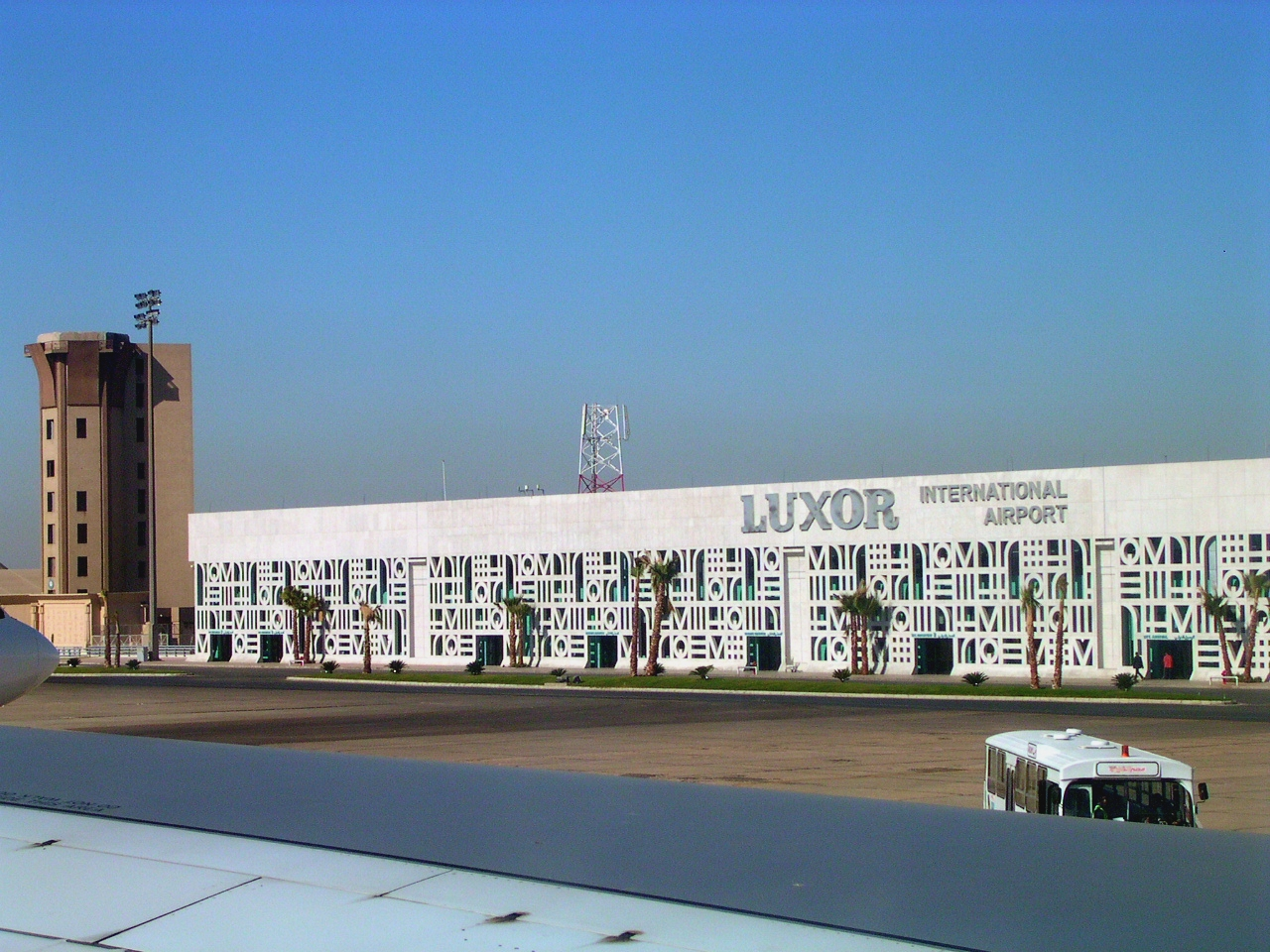
Apron view of Luxor International Airport

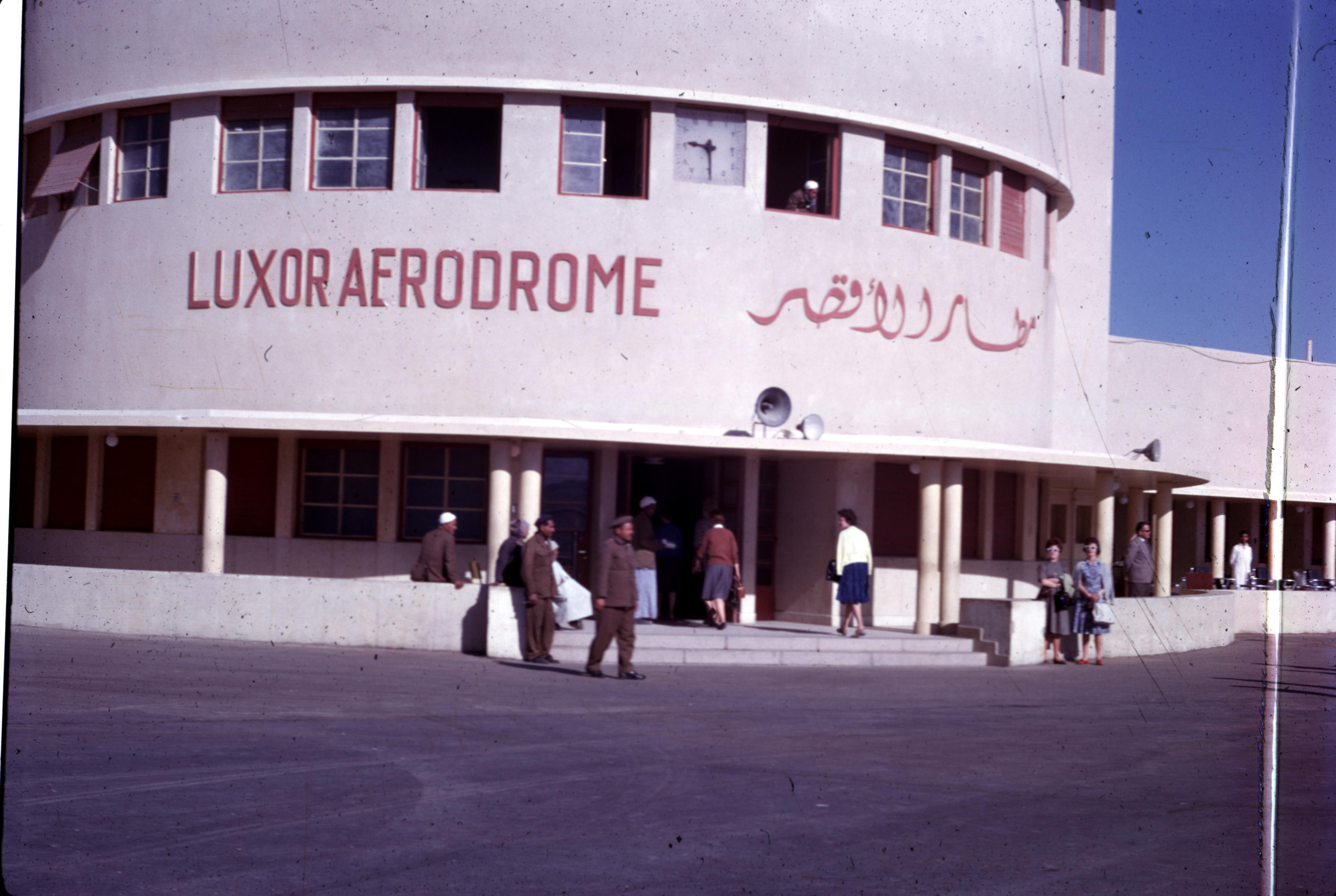
Luxor Aerodrome terminal 1961

| Airlines | Destinations |
|---|---|
| Aegean Airlines | Seasonal: Athens |
| Air Cairo | Bilbao, Bologna, Brussels (begins 18 December 2026), Cairo, Catania, Hurghada, Madrid, Málaga, Milan–Malpensa, Rome–Fiumicino, Sharm El Sheikh, Valencia; Seasonal: Barcelona, Cologne, Jeddah, Medina, Paris–Charles de Gaulle, Verona |
| easyJet | Seasonal: London–Gatwick, Lyon, Milan–Malpensa, Nantes, Paris–Charles de Gaulle |
| Edelweiss Air | Seasonal: Zürich |
| Egyptair | Cairo; Seasonal: Barcelona, Jeddah, London–Heathrow, Madrid, Milan–Malpensa, Sharm El Sheikh |
| Jazeera Airways | Kuwait City |
| Kuwait Airways | Seasonal: Kuwait City |
| Luxair | Seasonal: Luxembourg |
| Neos | Seasonal: Milan–Malpensa |
| Nesma Airlines | Seasonal: Cairo, Jeddah |
| Nile Air | Cairo; Seasonal charter: Milan–Malpensa, Rome–Fiumicino |
| Pegasus Airlines | Istanbul–Sabiha Gökçen |
| Petroleum Air Services | Seasonal charter: Cairo |
| Sundair | Seasonal: Berlin |
| Transavia | Seasonal: Paris–Orly |
| TUI Airways | Seasonal: London–Gatwick, Manchester |
| TUI fly Belgium | Seasonal: Brussels |
| TUI fly Deutschland | Seasonal: Düsseldorf |
| Vueling | Seasonal: Barcelona |

== Accidents and incidents ==
- On 21 September 1987, an EgyptAir Airbus A300 crashed on landing during a training flight, killing all five crew members on board.
- On 6 April 1994, a Sudan Airways Boeing 737-200 was hijacked and diverted to Luxor. Upon landing, the hijacker surrendered to the authorities. There were no fatalities or injuries and the aircraft was not damaged.
- On 20 February 2009, an Antonov An-12 crashed after an engine caught fire on take-off. All five crew were killed.

== See also ==
- List of airports in Egypt
