= Fresh Air (airline) =

IATA	ICAO	Call sign
—	FRR	Fresh Air
- Founded: 1998
- Commenced operations: 2001
- Ceased operations: 30 April 2007
- Fleet size: See Fleet below

Fresh Air was a cargo airline based in Ikeja, Lagos, Nigeria. It operated cargo charter services mainly within West Africa. Its main base was Murtala Mohammed International Airport, Lagos.

== Code data ==
- ICAO Code: FRR
- Callsign: FRESH AIR

== Fleet ==
As of March 2007 the Fresh Air fleet included:

- 1 Antonov An-12
- 1 Boeing 737-200
- 1 McDonnell Douglas DC-9-30

== Popular culture ==
Fresh Air was the name of the fictional passenger airline in the 2005 Wes Craven film Red Eye starring Rachel McAdams.
