= Air People International =

Thai cargo airline

| IATA | ICAO | Call sign |
|---|---|---|
| 3D | APG | AIR PEOPLE |
- Founded: 1986; 39 years ago
- Headquarters: Bangkok, Thailand
- Website: http://www.apiairlines.com

Air People International is a cargo airline based in Bangkok, Thailand. It operates three times weekly cargo flights between Thailand and Dhaka, Bangladesh.

== History ==
The airline was established in 1986 as a cargo General Sales Agent. It started operations in 2003 operating under its own code using Antonov An-12 aircraft.
