= Air Sofia =

Airline

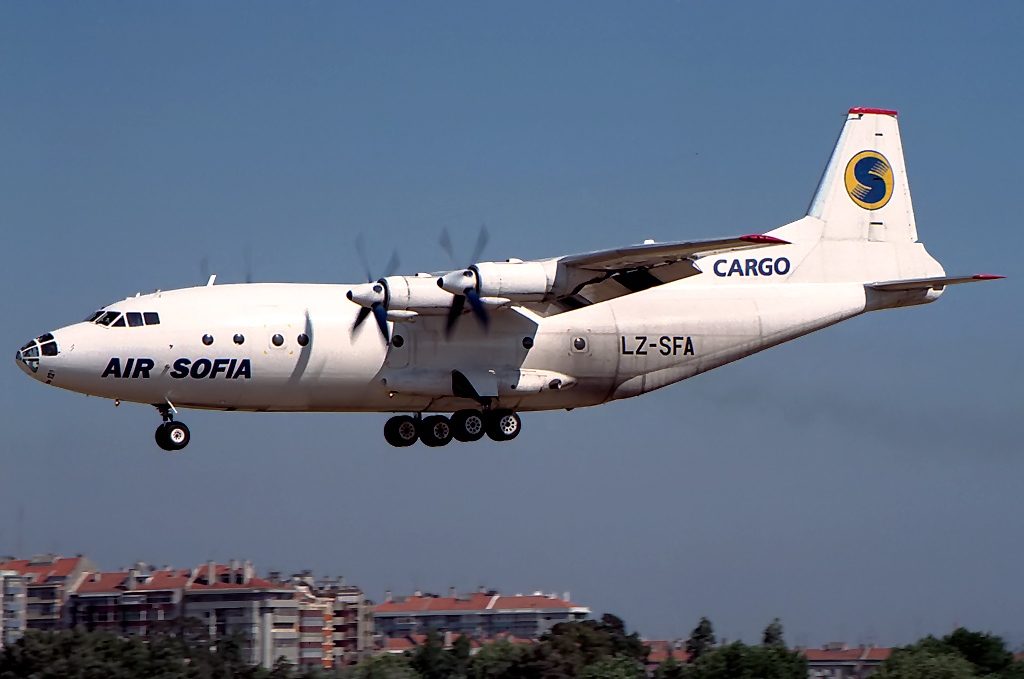
- Antonov An-12
| IATA | ICAO | Call sign |
|---|---|---|
| CT | SFB | AIR SOFIA |
- Founded: 1992
- Commenced operations: 11 February 1992
- Ceased operations: 5 March 2007
- Operating bases: Sofia Airport
- Fleet size: 8
- Destinations: Charters
- Headquarters: Sofia, Bulgaria
- Website: www.airsofia.com

Air Sofia was an airline based in Sofia, Bulgaria. It operated charter flights to destinations in Europe, Africa, the Far East, South America and the Middle East. It also leased and wet leased aircraft to other airlines. Its main base was Sofia Airport.

On August 6, 2008 Air Sofia's established Flight Training Organization FTO, according to JAR-FCL. Nowadays Air Sofia conducts flight training for PPL, CPL, ATPL, MCC.

== History ==
The airline started operations on February 1, 1992. It was owned by Georgi Ivanov (Managing Director) and Lilian Todorov (President). By March 2007 it employed 150 staff. On 5 March 2007 Bulgaria prohibited the operations of five Bulgarian air carriers including Air Sofia. In the following weeks the airline relocated to Serbia under the name United International Airlines.

== Fleet ==
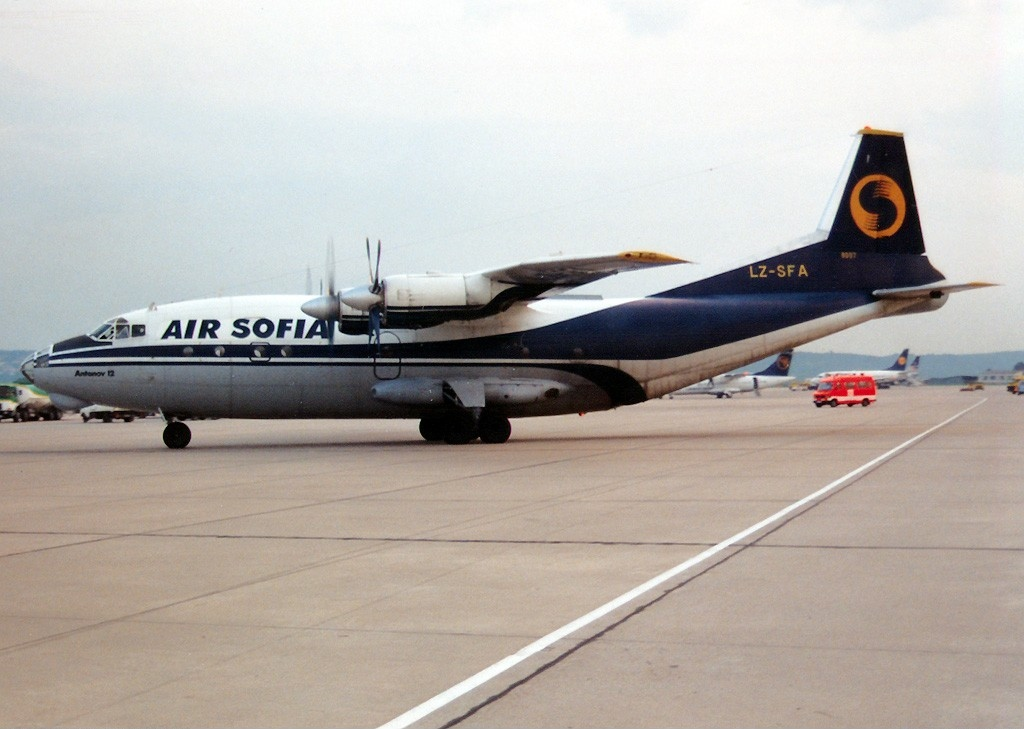
The very first livery of Antonov An-12BP

At January 2005 the airline operated:

- 6 Antonov An-12
- 1 Antonov An-24
- 1 Boeing 737-800, disposed of April 2005
- Cessna 172 N
- Piper PA-44 Seminole180 turbo
