= 2009 Aerolift Ilyushin Il-76 crash =

2009 aviation accident in Uganda

- The aircraft involved in the accident, seen in 2001 while in service with a previous operator

Accident
- Date: 9 March 2009
- Summary: Possible engine issue aggravated by pilot intoxication and fatigue
- Site: Lake Victoria, off Entebbe International Airport, Uganda; 00°03′55.3″S 32°26′49.5″E

Aircraft
- Aircraft type: Ilyushin Il-76T
- Operator: Aerolift, operating for the African Union Mission to Somalia
- Registration: S9-SAB
- Flight origin: Entebbe International Airport, Kampala, Uganda
- Destination: Aden Adde International Airport, Mogadishu, Somalia
- Occupants: 11
- Passengers: 7
- Crew: 4
- Fatalities: 11
- Survivors: 0

Ground casualties
- Ground injuries: 2

On 9 March 2009, an Ilyushin Il-76T, an Aerolift cargo flight for the African Union Mission to Somalia from Entebbe International Airport, Uganda, to Aden Adde International Airport, Somalia, crashed into Lake Victoria shortly after take off, killing all 11 people on board. The investigation into the accident could not identify with certainty the cause of the crash, but it was hypothesized and deemed highly likely that the aircraft suffered from engine problems shortly after take off, and that they were mismanaged by the crew due to various factors.

== Background ==
=== Aircraft ===
The aircraft involved in the accident was an Ilyushin Il-76T registered in Sao Tome and Principe as S9-SAB. The aircraft was manufactured in 1977.

=== Passengers and crew ===
The aircraft was carrying a total of eleven people, seven passengers, two Ugandan, three Burundian, one South African and one Indian nationals, members of the African Union Mission to Somalia, and four crew members, two Russian nationals, who were the captain and first officer, and two Ukrainian nationals, the navigator and the flight engineer. Among the three Burundian soldiers on board there were a brigadier, a colonel and a general.

== Accident ==
The aircraft took off at 05:06 local time from Entebbe International Airport, Uganda, for a charter cargo flight to Aden Adde International Airport, Somalia, carrying 16 tonnes of supplies, tents and water purification equipment to Ugandan soldiers stationed in Somalia. Shortly after take off, as the aircraft was climbing, ground witnesses reported fire coming from two of its four engines. The plane then lost altitude and disappeared from radar at 05:14. The Il-76 crashed into one of the deepest regions of Lake Victoria, about 10 kilometres (6 mi) off the coast from the airport. All 11 people on board were killed. The wave generated by the impact capsized a boat with two fishermen on board; they were injured but survived.

=== Recovery operation ===
After the crash a multi-day recovery operation was launched. On 11 March the first two bodies were recovered, but, due to the depth of the lake and difficulties encountered by local rescue teams, in the following days Ugandan authorities asked for help from the United States. Sonar technicians from the US Navy arrived in Uganda from Naval Air Station Sigonella, Italy. The American technicians used unmanned underwater vehicles to map the debris field present. On 25 March the joint recovery mission managed to raise the tail section of the plane from the bottom of Lake Victoria. The search for the aircraft's flight recorders continued, but they were never found.

== Investigation ==
Ugandan authorities launched an investigation into the crash, which was finalised on 13 January 2010. The report stated that that investigators did not have sufficient evidence, a large part of the wreckage and both flight recorders were not recovered, and were unable to establish a cause. A highly plausible hypothesis was made. The aircraft had a loss of engine power during take off, confirmed by ground witnesses and supported by previous occurrences involving the same aircraft which occurred in December 2008 when the Il-76 lost engine power taking off from Entebbe International Airport. After that previous incident, the airplane remained in Uganda for two weeks, but local aviation authorities did not perform any repairs, there were no technicians trained on Soviet-made aircraft. The report also noted the pilots had very little rest the night before departure, after spending the evening drinking, and were probably under the influence of alcohol during the flight. There was no radio operator on board, as required in the Il-76 cockpit, the crew subsequently mishandled the engine problem, leading to the crash. The aircraft was also beyond its maximum amount of flight cycles without any inspection or repair.
