= Aerovis Airlines =

Ukrainian cargo airline

IATA	ICAO	Call sign
V6	VIZ	AEROVIZ
- Founded: 2003
- Fleet size: 2
- Headquarters: Kyiv, Ukraine
- Website: aerovis.aero

Aerovis Airlines, a Ukrainian cargo airline established in 2003, currently remains operational despite the war in Ukraine. Based in Kyiv, it provides cargo charter services throughout Europe, the Middle East, and Africa, and has even expressed interest in expanding its services to the United States. The airline operates with a small fleet of Antonov aircraft, and while many Ukrainian aviation services have faced disruptions or shutdowns, Aerovis has continued some of its activities in the cargo sector.

== Fleet ==
=== Current fleet ===
As of August 2025, Aerovis Airlines operates the following aircraft:

Aerovis Airlines fleet
Aircraft	In service	Orders	Notes
Antonov An-12B	1	0	
Antonov An-12BP	1	0	
Total	2	0	

=== Former fleet ===
The airline previously operated the following aircraft:

- 2 further Antonov An-12BP
