= Avial NV =

Russian airline (2000–2011)

Avial NV Авиаль НВ
IATA	ICAO	Call sign
-	NVI	NEW AVIAL
- Founded: 2000
- Ceased operations: 2011
- Operating bases: Domodedovo International Airport
- Fleet size: 6
- Headquarters: Moscow, Russia
- Key people: Yevgeny Viktorovich Rybyakov (General Director)

Avial NV, LLC (Russian: ООО «Авиакомпания «Авиаль НВ») was an airline based in Moscow, Russia. It operated charter, passenger, and cargo flights. Its main base was Domodedovo International Airport, Moscow. Operations were suspended in 2010 with debts of over 1 million roubles and operations were banned after the expiration of the license in July 2011.

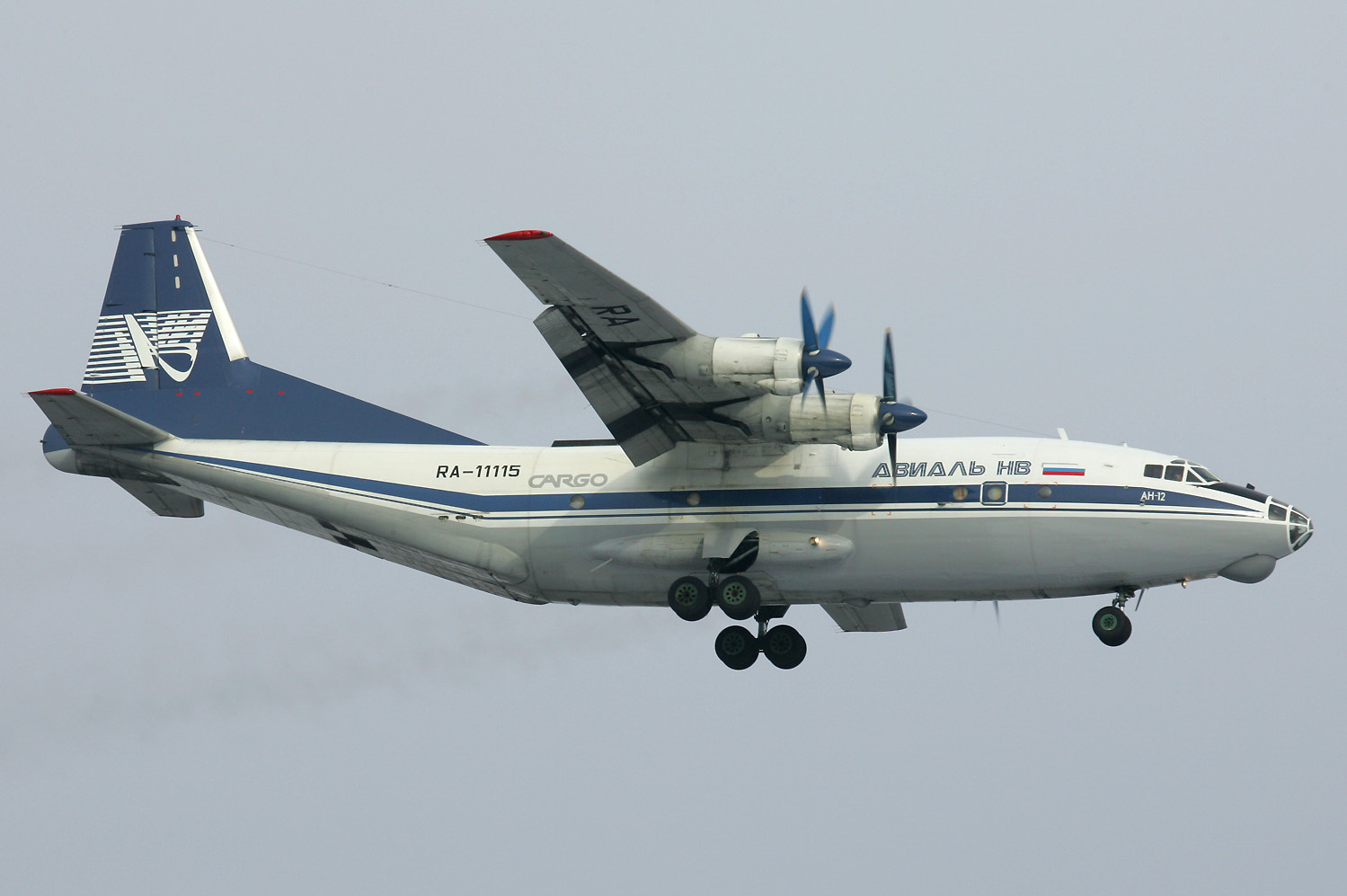
An Avial NV Antonov An-12.

== Fleet ==
The Avial fleet consisted of the following aircraft (at March 2007):

- 6 Antonov An-12

=== Previously operated ===
- 1 Tupolev Tu-154B-2 (at January 2005)
