= Antonov An-12 =

Soviet medium-range transport aircraft

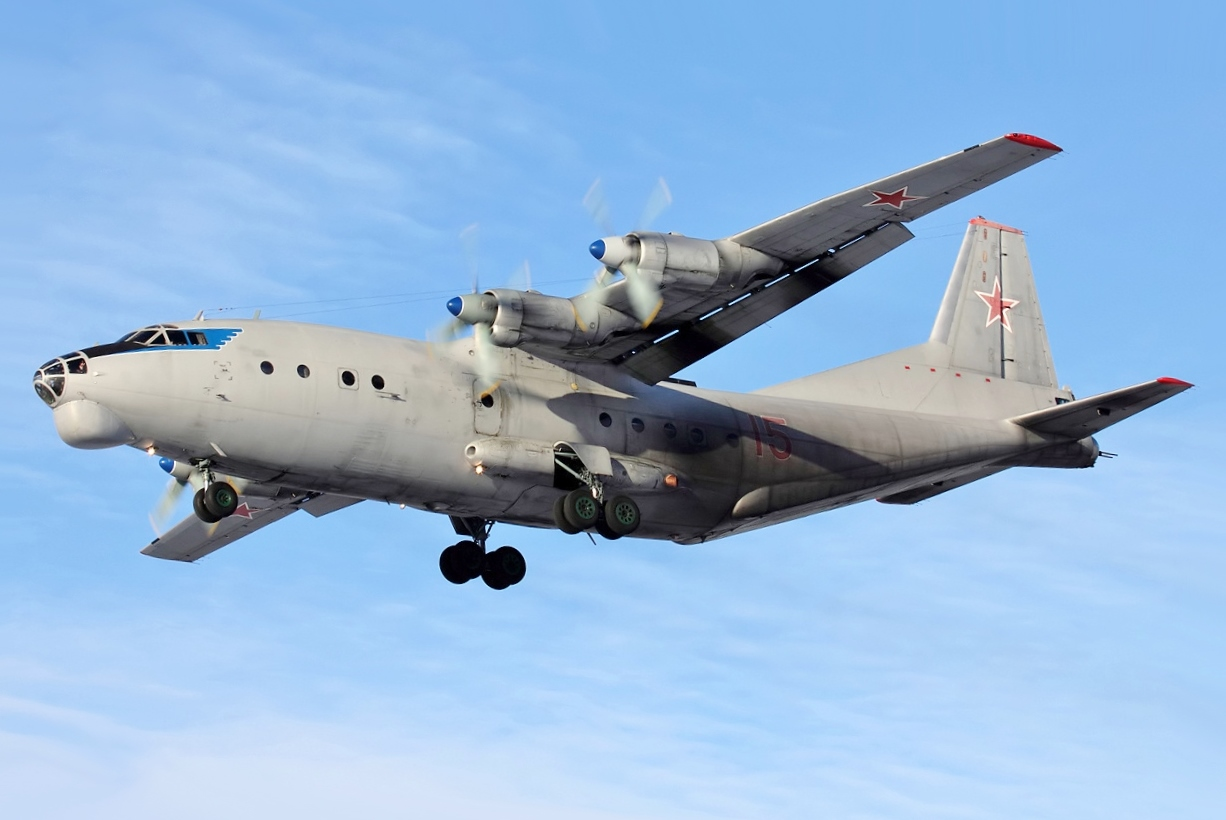
- An-12 of the Russian Air Force

General information
- Type: Cargo aircraft / military transport aircraft
- Manufacturer: Irkutsk Aviation Plant; Tashkent Mechanical Plant
- Designer: Antonov
- Status: In service
- Primary users: Soviet Air Forces (historical) Russian Air Force; Ukraine Air Alliance; Cavok Air
- Number built: 1,248

History
- Manufactured: 1957–1973
- Introduction date: 1959
- First flight: 16 December 1957
- Developed from: Antonov An-10
- Developed into: Shaanxi Y-8

The Antonov An-12 (Russian: Антонов Ан-12; NATO reporting name: Cub) is a four-engined turboprop cargo/military transport aircraft designed by Antonov and produced at the Irkutsk Aviation Plant and the Tashkent Mechanical Plant in the Soviet Union. It is a militarised version of the Antonov An-10 transport aircraft and was produced in many variants.

Developed during the 1950s and introduced by the Soviet Air Forces in 1959, it remained the standard medium-range cargo and paratroop transport aircraft of the service throughout the rest of the Cold War. A total of 1,248 aircraft were built in the Soviet Union. Soviet An-12s was deployed in a variety of roles, including search and rescue, electronic warfare, VIP transport, and aerial refueling tanker amongst others. During the 1960s, China purchased several An-12s along with a licence to locally produced more; this resulted in the Shaanxi Y-8, which entered production in the early 1980s. While Soviet production of the An-12 was terminated in 1973, the Y-8 derivative continued to be produced into the twenty-first century. Following the dissolution of the Soviet Union, the An-12 has continued to be operated by numerous operators across the various successor states, including the Russian Air Force and Ukraine Air Alliance.

== Design and development ==
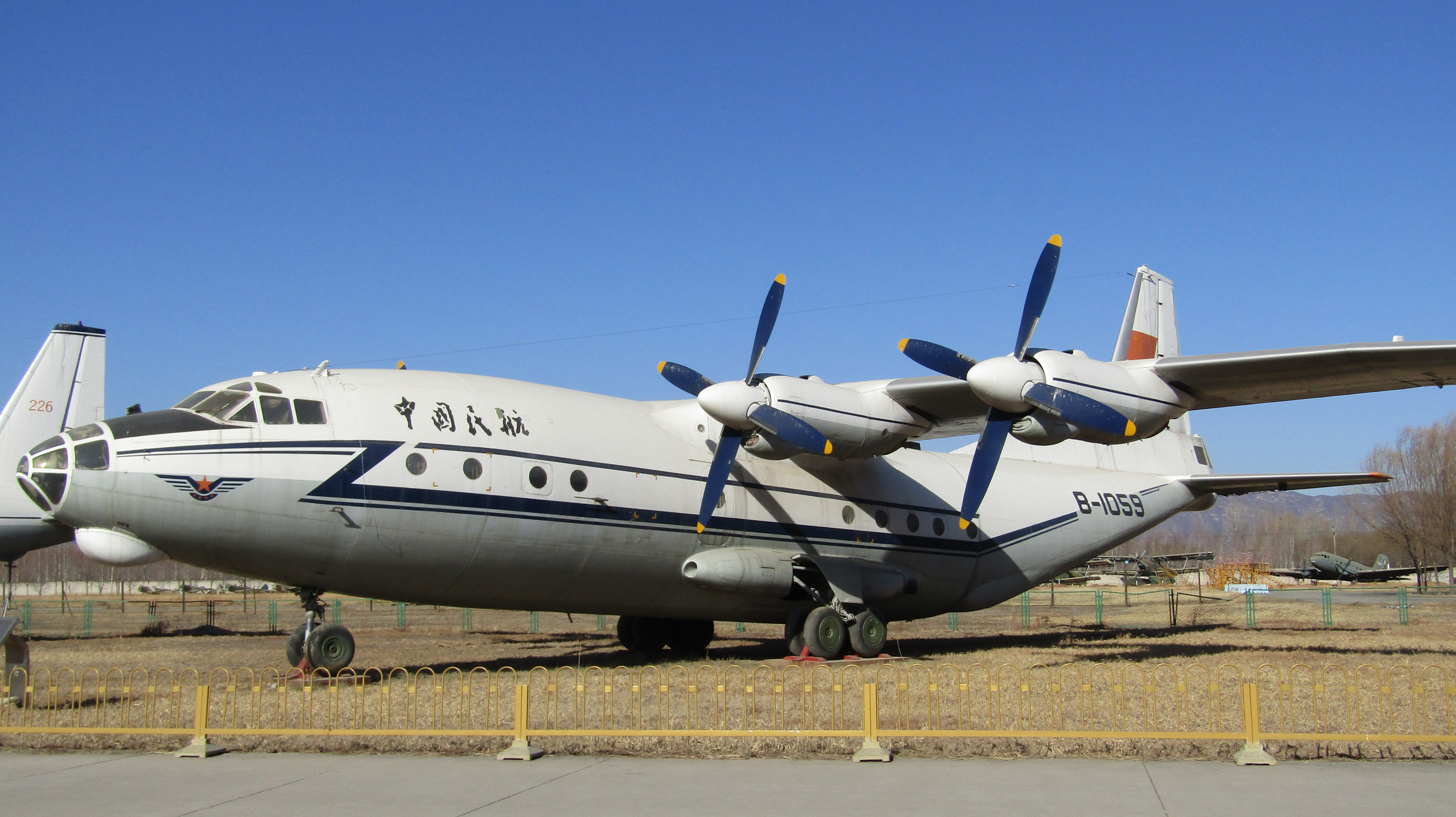
Antonov An-12BP at China Aviation Museum, Beijing

The origins of the An-12 can be traced back to several other projects undertaken by the design bureau Antonov, such as the Antonov An-8 (the first turboprop-powered transport aircraft in the Soviet Union) and the Antonov An-10 (a four-engined passenger transport). Allegedly, Nikita Khrushchev, the Soviet General Secretary, personally requested Antonov to design an enlarged variant of the An-8 optimised for use as a military transport aircraft. The resulting aircraft would become the An-12.

The general configuration of the An-12 included a rounded fuselage, forward-set cockpit, glazed nose, shoulder-mounted wings, and a rear cargo door; visually, it loosely resembles the United States–built Lockheed C-130 Hercules transport aircraft. Having been designed specifically for use as a freighter, it possessed several useful attributed for the role, including sufficient performance to perform short take-offs of 700 meters, could operate from austere air strips, and achieve impressive lifting qualities for the era. Typically flown by a crew of five, comprising two pilots, a flight engineer, navigator, and radio operator, military An-12s were commonly armed with a defensive turret in the tail and thus had a sixth crew as a gunner.

The elevated tail of the aircraft provided sufficient clearance for vehicles and bulky payloads to be loaded into the aircraft's sizable cargo hold via the rear door, which was powered and provisioned with a loading ramp. To ease the loading process, a pair of winches and an electrically-powered gantry crane capable of traversing the length of the hold were provisioned for moving payloads. The hold, which has a maximum payload capacity of 18 tonnes, has a length of 45ft, a width of 10ft, and a height of 8ft. The An-12 had the capacity to carry up to 100 fully-equipped paratroopers or 20,000 kg (44,000 lb) of cargo. In addition to the standard transport version, numerous variants of the aircraft have been produced for other roles, including electronic warfare, VIP transport, aerial refueling tanker, crew trainer, radiation reconnaissance, and an airborne accident investigation laboratory. When fully-fuelled, it had a range of 3,540 miles and a maximum altitude of 34,449ft. The An-12 was powered by four Ivchenko AI-20L (or AI-20M) turboprop engines capable of producing 4,000 shp.

In December 1957, the first prototype An-12, 7900101, performed its maiden flight from the State Aircraft Factory outside Irkutsk, Siberia, flown by the experienced test pilot Yakov Vernikov. Two years later, the first An-12s were accepted into service with operational units of the Soviet Air Force. Early on, the aircraft was produced at the State Aviation Factory near Irkutsk. Starting in 1962, An-12 production was transferred to Tashkent, where 830 aircraft were built. Later, production was reallocated to Voronezh and Kazan.

=== Chinese production ===
In the 1960s, China purchased several An-12 aircraft from the Soviet Union, along with a licence to assemble the aircraft locally. Due to the Sino-Soviet split, the Soviet Union withdrew its technical assistance, however, the Xi'an Aircraft Company and Xi'an Aircraft Design Institute proceeded to reverse engineer the An-12 to facilitate local production regardless. While delayed considerably, the first flight of a Chinese-assembled An-12 took place in 1974, one year after the USSR had opted to cease their own production of the type.

In 1981, the Chinese version of the An-12, designated Y-8, finally entered production. Since then, the Y-8 has become one of China's most popular military and civilian transport/cargo aircraft, with many variants produced and exported. A Tu-16/H-6 bomber navigator cockpit design was chosen for the Y-8 instead of the original An-12 shorter navigator cockpit design, as the H-6 bomber had been in serial production for some time. Although the An-12 is no longer in production either in Russia or Ukraine, the Y-8 is upgraded and produced in China. The latest Y8-F600 is a joint venture between the Shaanxi Aircraft Company, Antonov Aeronautical Scientific Technical Complex (ASTC), and Pratt & Whitney Canada. The Y8-F600 has a redesigned fuselage, western avionics, PW150B turboprop engines with an R-408 propeller system, and a two-crew glass cockpit.

== Operational history ==
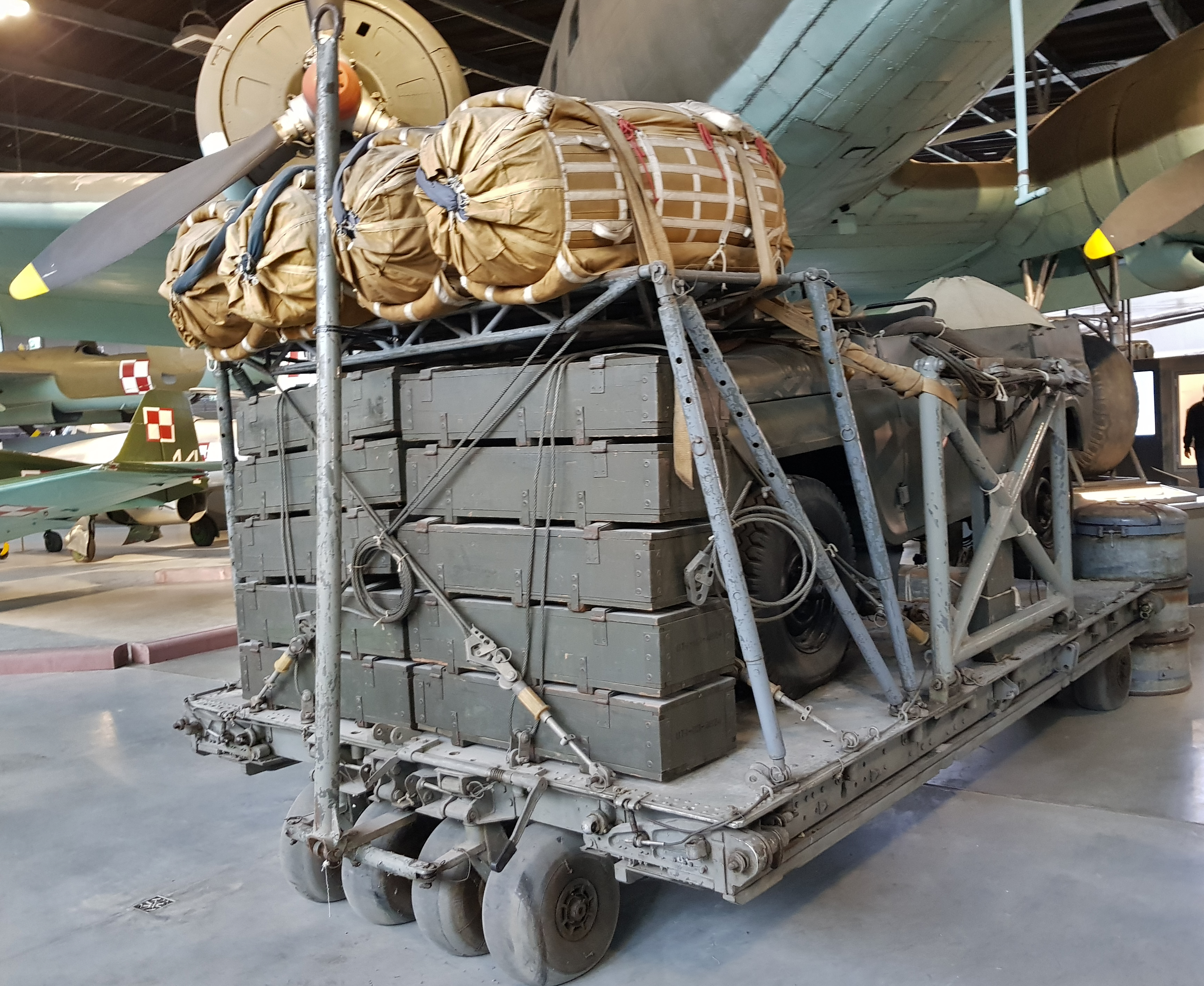
P-7 airdrop platform for use with An-12 aircraft. Equipped with MKS-5-12P parachute system. Loaded weight 4000-4900 kg. First used at the October Storm exercises near Erfurt, GDR. Last dropped in Poland 1986.

=== Soviet Air Forces ===
Soviet An-12s were used during a variety of major deployments during the Cold War. In 1968, numerous aircraft provided logistical support for Warsaw Pact forces during the suppression of the Prague Spring protests in Czechoslovakia. During the Yom Kippur War of 1973, together with the larger Antonov An-22, Soviet An-12s transported 15,000 tons of military supplies to Soviet-aligned Egypt and Syria. Furthermore, six distinct models of the An-12 were produced and operated by the Soviets specifically to conduct ELINT and ECM operations. Several such-configured aircraft were routinely stationed in Sperenberg, East Germany during much of the Cold War.

The Soviet Air Force's An-22s were prominently used during the Soviet–Afghan War of the 1980s. In the initial invasion, An-12s were used to transport three airborne divisions into Kabul. Due to a lack of adequate infrastructure across Afghanistan, Soviet ground forces were atypically reliant upon being supplied by several airbases that were challenging for most other transport aircraft to access, while the An-12 proved to be the optimal choice. Furthermore, among Soviet soldiers, it became infamously known that the aircraft would routinely take off from Afghanistan to Tashkent with "Cargo 200" or coffins with the bodies of deceased soldiers, though this reputation wasn't well-known in the early stages of the conflict. To this regard, the aircraft was nicknamed "Black Tulip" (Russian: «Чёрный тюльпан»); the origin of the nickname is unclear. There are quite a few monuments in Russia named Black Tulip to commemorate those killed during the Afghan War.

=== Russia ===
Following the end of the Cold War and the dissolution of the Soviet Union, the Russian Air Force inherited a sizable fleet of An-12s and continued to operate the type. By 2015, the service reportedly had 60 An-12s in its inventory and held ambitions to eventually phase out the type in favour of the domestically-produced Ilyushin Il-76 airlifter.

During the Russian invasion of Ukraine, Russia lost one An-12 on 1 June 2025 due to Ukraine's Operation Spider's Web. By April 2026, Russia reportedly had 368 An-12s in its inventory, however a substantial portion of these urgently required repairs while the Russian government had officially acknowledged that the lack of domestic production made it currently impossible to fully restore its Antonov-designed aircraft.

=== Others ===
Numerous foreign militaries operated the An-12. The Indian Air Force used their fleet to provide support for military operations during the Indo-Pakistani War of 1971. The type was also active during the Angolan Civil War.

In the Middle East, Soviet-aligned countries were commonly supplied with the type. Egypt received its first An-12s in 1959 and operated a 34-strong fleet until the last aircraft was withdrawn in 1997. In 1962, Iraq took delivery of its first An-12 and flew 12 examples through to the start of the First Gulf War. Syria operated six An-12s between 1973 and 1991.

Several civil organisations have also operated the An-12; numerous aircraft have been available for charter. Into the twenty-first century, the An-12 had remained popular amongst cargo operators, especially those in the CIS, Africa and the Indian subcontinent.

On 8 January 2009, following numerous incidents involving the An-12 in the United Arab Emirates (UAE), the General Civil Aviation Authority (GCAA) issued a temporary ban on the type operationing within UAE airspace. On 1 March 2010, the UAE's ban was made permanent after the An-12 failed a GCAA airworthiness evaluation. In November 2015, following an accident involving an An-12, South Sudan banned the type from its airspace.

== Variants ==
In addition to its basic cargo transport role, the An-12 was adapted as a platform for a wide variety of specialist tasks and some 30 different variants were produced. Upgrades included increased take-off weights and additional fuel capacity. The upgraded variant An-12BP became the standard tactical transport of the Soviet and other air forces. In 2019, it was announced at the military "Army-2019" Forum that Russia started working on an armed ground-attack and close air support variant of the An-12, similar to the American Lockheed AC-130. In 2021, it was announced that the gunship would not be based on the An-12 after all, as it did not meet the requirements for a "flying gunner".

== Operators ==
=== Civil operators ===
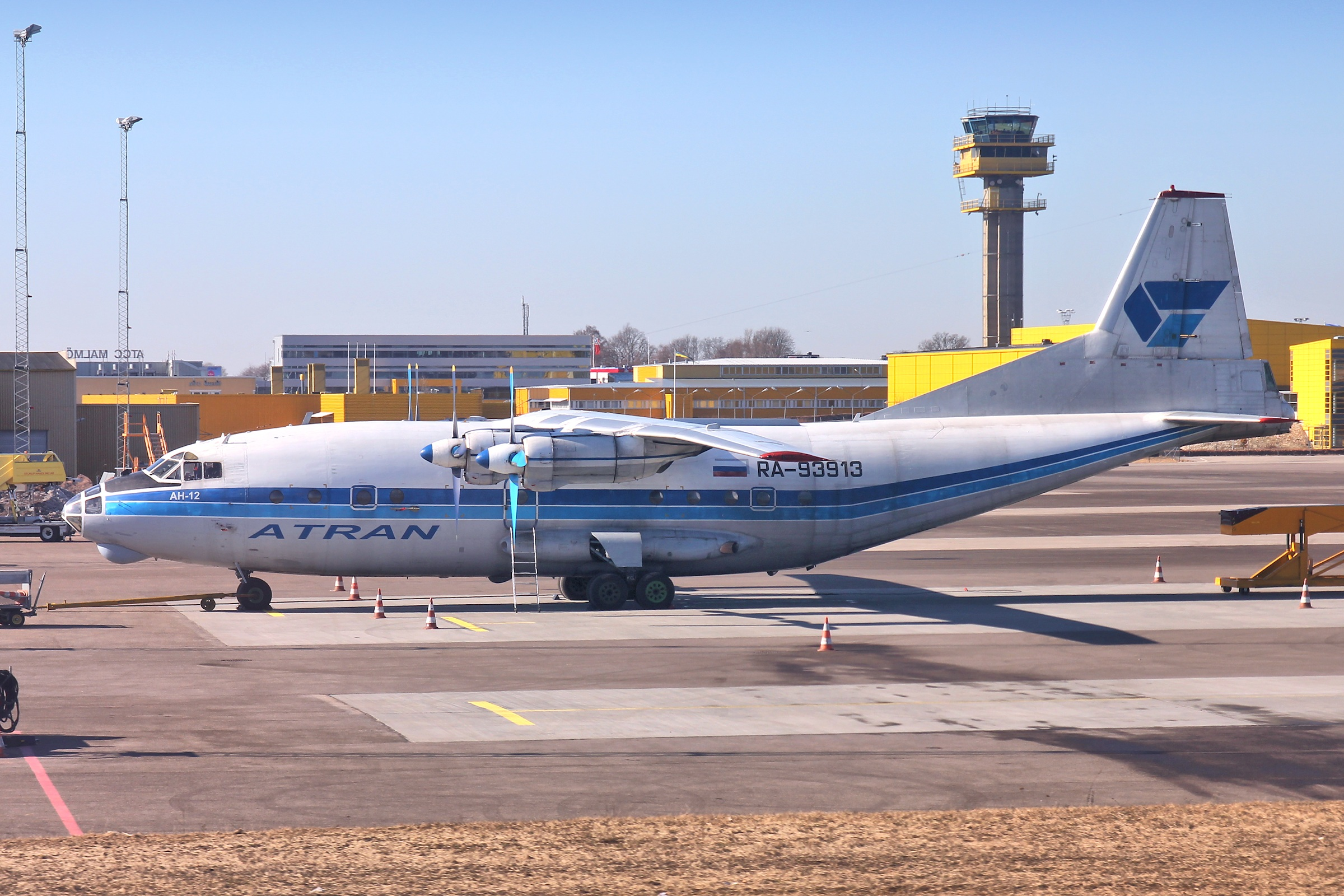
47-year-old An-12 still operational, seen at Malmö Airport, Sweden

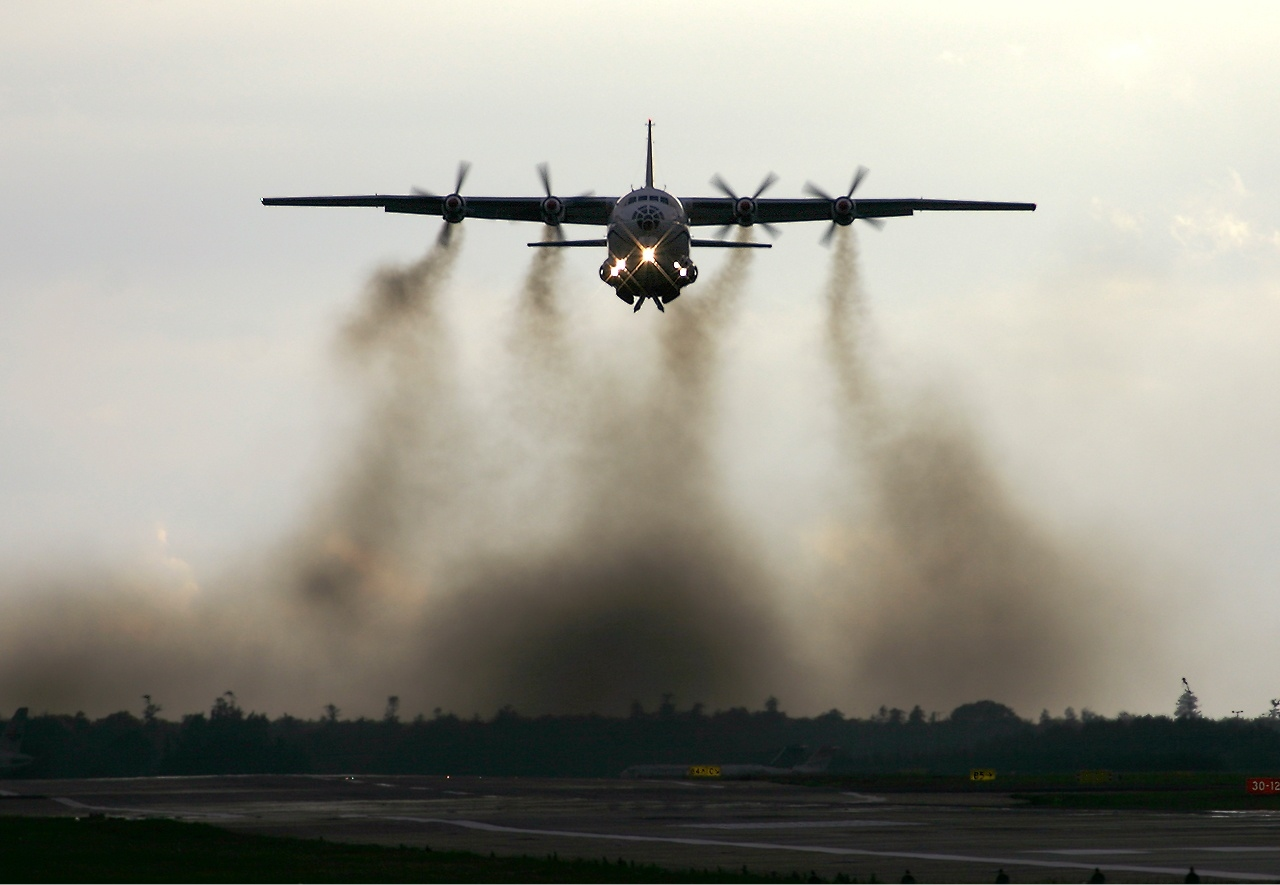
An An-12A of Vega Air makes a smoky takeoff from Kastrup Airport in 2004

==== Current ====
Belarus

- Ruby Star Airways

Mexico

- Air One (Mexico)

Russia

- ATRAN Cargo Airlines

Thailand

- Air People International

Ukraine

- Aerovis Airlines
- Antonov Airlines
- Cavok Air
- Meridian
- Motor Sich Airlines
- Ukraine Air Alliance
- Volare Airlines

United States

- SRX

==== Former ====
Angola

- Alada

Armenia

- Air Armenia

Bulgaria

- Balkan Bulgarian Airlines
- Air Sofia

China

- CAAC Airlines; see also Shaanxi Y-8

Egypt

- Egyptair

Indonesia

- Asia Cargo Airlines
- Air Mark

France

- Darta

Guinea

- Air Guinée

Ghana

- Ghana Airways – The sole An-12 was delivered in October 1961. Withdrawn from use in 1962 and returned to the Soviet Union in 1963.

Iraq

- Iraqi Airways

Nigeria

- Fresh Air

Philippines

- Interisland Airlines

Poland

- LOT Polish Airlines

Russia

- Avial Aviation
- SAT Airlines

Serbia

- United International Airlines

Sudan

- Azza Transport
- Badr Airlines
- Juba Air Cargo

=== Military operators ===
==== Current ====
Angola

- People's Air and Air Defence Force of Angola

Chad

- Chadian Air Force

Ethiopia

- Ethiopian Air Force

Kazakhstan

- Kazakh Air Defense Forces

Myanmar

- Myanmar Air Force

Nigeria

- Nigerian Air Force – 12 An-12s in service

Russia

- Russian Aerospace Forces
- Russian Naval Aviation

Sudan

- Sudanese Air Force

Uzbekistan

- Uzbekistan Air and Air Defence Forces

Yemen

- Yemeni Air Force

==== Former ====
Algeria

- Algerian Air Force

Armenia

- Armenian Air Force

Afghanistan

- The Afghan Air Force operated 12 from 1981 through 2001. One of their An-12s which defected to Pakistan is preserved at PAF Museum, Karachi

Bangladesh

- Bangladesh Air Force operated from 1973 to 1980s, now all retired

Ivory Coast

- Cote d'Ivoire Air Force

Czech Republic

- Czech Air Force

Czechoslovakia

- Czechoslovak Air Force: Czechoslovakia's fleet numbering two was divided evenly between the Czech Republic and Slovak Republic upon split with Slovakia. All CzAF An-12s were phased out of active service in the 1990s.

Egypt

- Egyptian Air Force - 22 acquired

Georgia
India

- The Indian Air Force inducted the first of these aircraft in 1961, when it raised No.44 Squadron "The Himalayan Geese". Six of these aircraft soon took part in airlifting army reinforcements to Ladakh during the Sino-Indian War of 1962. The An-12 was subsequently used to raise No.25 Squadron. The An-12s were also used as heavy bombers during the Indo-Pakistani War of 1971. All IAF An-12s were phased out of active service in the 1990s. One of them is preserved at the Indian Air Force Museum, Palam, New Delhi.

Indonesia

- Indonesian Air Force – Retired in 1970

Iraq

- Iraqi Air Force – Retired in 2003

Jordan

- Royal Jordanian Air Force

Mongolia

- Mongolian Air Force - Retired 12 An-12

Poland

- Polish Air Force used two An-12B from 1966 until 1977 (crashed) and 1995

Slovakia

- Slovak Air Force received one An-12BP registered 2209 in 1993. It was sold to Moldavia in 1999 and now serves with Angolan Air Force.

South Yemen

- Yemeni Air Force

Soviet Union

- The Soviet fleet was dispersed among many of the Soviet Union's successor states.
- Soviet Air Force
- Soviet Naval Aviation

Syria

- Syrian Air Force

Tanzania

- Tanzania Air Force Command

Turkmenistan

Turkmenistan Air Forces

Ukraine

- Ukrainian Air Force
- Ukrainian Naval Aviation

Yugoslavia

- SFR Yugoslav Air Force

== Specifications (An-12) ==
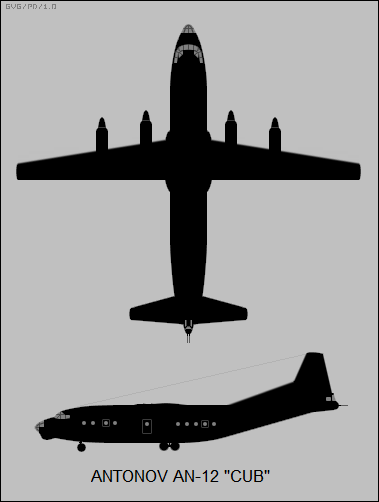
Antonov An-12

Data from Global Aircraft, Airliners.net

General characteristics

- Crew: five (two pilots, flight engineer, navigator, radio operator)
- Capacity: 20,000 kg (44,000 lb) payload / 60 paratroopers / 2x BMD-1 armoured vehicles
- Length: 33.1 m (108 ft 7 in)
- Wingspan: 38 m (124 ft 8 in)
- Height: 10.53 m (34 ft 7 in)
- Wing area: 121.7 m^{2} (1,310 sq ft)
- Empty weight: 28,000 kg (61,729 lb)
- Max takeoff weight: 61,000 kg (134,482 lb)
- Powerplant: 4 × Ivchenko AI-20L or AI-20M turboprop engines, 3,000 kW (4,000 shp) each
- Propellers: 4-bladed constant-speed reversible-pitch propellers

Performance

- Maximum speed: 660 km/h (410 mph, 360 kn)
- Cruise speed: 570 km/h (350 mph, 310 kn)
- Range: 5,700 km (3,500 mi, 3,100 nmi) with maximum fuel

3,600 km (2,200 mi; 1,900 nmi) with maximum payload

- Service ceiling: 10,200 m (33,500 ft)
- Rate of climb: 10.2 m/s (2,010 ft/min)

Armament

- Guns: 2× 23 mm (0.906 in) Nudelman-Rikhter NR-23 cannons in a tail turret (some aircraft)

== See also ==
- Military transport aircraft

Related development

- Antonov An-22
- Shaanxi Y-8

Aircraft of comparable role, configuration, and era

- Lockheed C-130 Hercules
- Transall C.160

Related lists

- List of military aircraft of the Soviet Union and the CIS
