= Stan (surname) =

Stan is a common Romanian surname. Notable persons with that name include:

- Alexandra Stan (born 1989), Romanian singer
- Alexandru Stan (born 1989), Romanian footballer
- Kidnapping of Colleen Stan, the girl in the box
- Daniel Stan (born 1978), Romanian footballer
- Gabriel Stan (born 1952), Romanian football manager
- Ilie Stan (born 1967), Romanian footballer and football manager
- Lavinia Stan (born 1966), Romanian political scientist
- Marius Stan (scientist) (born 1961), Romanian scientist and actor
- Marius Stan (politician) (born 1957), Romanian footballer and football official, and mayor of Galați
- Mircea Stan (born 1977), Romanian footballer
- Sally Bould Stan (née Sally Waldner; 1917–2008), American architect in California
- Sebastian Stan (born 1982), Romanian-American actor
- Ștefan Stan (born 1977), Romanian singer
- Valerian Stan (born 1955), Romanian military officer, human rights activist and civil servant

== See also ==
- Stanley
- Stan (disambiguation)
- Stan (given name), a Romanian given name
- Stana (disambiguation)
- Stănești (disambiguation)
- Stănuleasa (disambiguation)
- Stănescu (surname)
- Stănoiu (surname) — search for "Stănoiu"
- Stănilă (surname) — search for "Stănilă"
- Stănuleț (surname) — search for "Stănuleț"
- Stăniloae (surname) — search for "Stăniloae"
- Stănișoară (surname) — search for "Stănișoară"
- Stănileşti, a commune in Vaslui County, Romania
- Stana (disambiguation)
- Stâna (disambiguation)
- Stanca (disambiguation)
- Stânca (disambiguation)
