= Yaroslav Minkin =

Ukrainian poet, cultural activist, peacebuilder, human rights defender

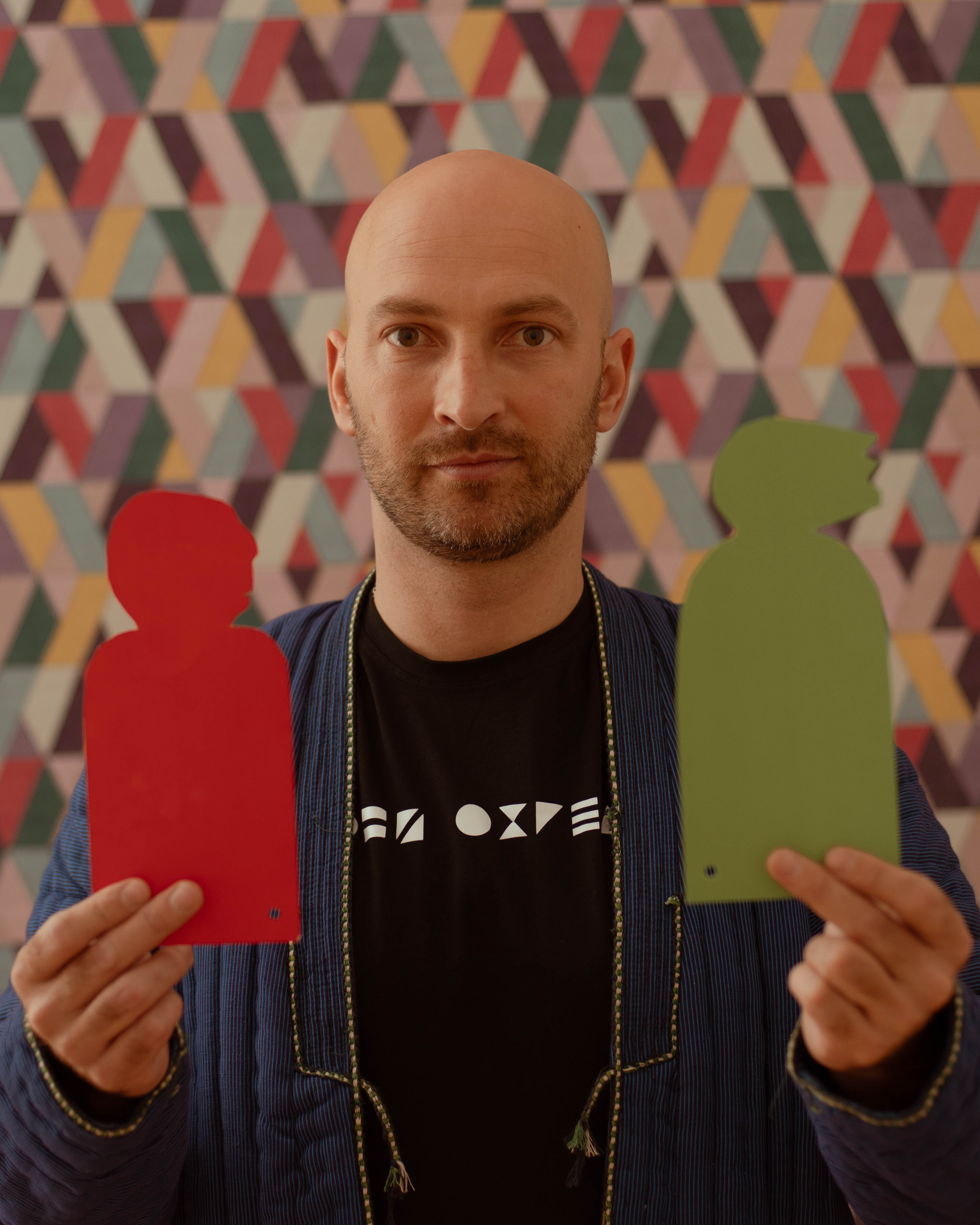
- Born: Ярослав Борисович Мінкін; 10 January 1984 (age 42); Luhansk, Luhansk Oblast, Ukraine
- Education: Ukrainian Catholic University
- Occupations: poet, cultural activist, peacebuilder, human rights defender
- Organization: STAN (art-group)
- Known for: International Peace Day in Ukraine, poetry slams, art interventions in Luhansk, cultural mapping

Yaroslav Minkin (Ukrainian: Ярослав Борисович Мінкін; born 10 January 1984) is a Ukrainian poet, cultural activist, peacebuilder, and human rights defender. Yaroslav Minkin is a founder of the STAN (non-governmental organization), coordinator of the activists' empowerment program "Young Diversity Ambassadors," key expert in the Kuduk (cultural centre) and cultural claster Art Station in Samarkand. He is a trainer of Cultural Transformation Lab in Goethe Institute and independent facilitator in Eastern Partnership and Central Asia countries on cultural mapping and strategic cultural management, peace dialogue and social cohesion, youth and left-behind groups' participation, cultural diversity, and intercultural dialogue.

== Life and career ==
Yaroslav Minkin was born in Luhansk, Luhansk Oblast in Ukraine. He spent his adolescence in Yalta, Crimea in Ukraine. Yaroslav graduated from the school No. 12 in Yalta, where well-known soviet poet Nika Turbina studded as well. After the high school, he went back to Donbas for subsequent years. In 2000, he won his first poetry prizes in Yalta and Simferopol'. As a poet he became a member of STAN (art-group) in 2002, he won two international slam competitions (in Kyiv and Riga), made a significant number of art performances and actionism interventions against authoritarian tendencies in Ukraine from 2004 to 2014, and finally moved to human rights actions to defend cultural diversity and promote social inclusion in post-revolution society. During this period Minkin organized art protests and performances in front of the Ministry of Foreign Offers of Ukraine, educational and cultural departments, security police offices, detention centres, and jails in Luhansk, Kyiv, and some other Ukrainian cities.

In 2008 Minkin together became chairman of the board of STAN (non-governmental organization). In 2014, Minkin was forced to move from Luhansk because of the threats from the Russian hybrid army forces in Donbas and was back to action in Ivano-Frankivsk in Ukraine. This year he made a speech «Butterflies on the Luhansk military airfield» in the European External Action Service of European Commission seminar on culture and conflicts, «The Case of Ukraine» (2014). In Brussels, he tried to explain how artists and social activists kept human rights in the last decade. He also organized a peacebuilding action in Potsdamer Platz in Berlin.

Minkin graduated first from University of Luhansk in 2007 and then, in 2019, from Ukrainian Catholic University with thesis about strengthening the role of young generation in political decision-making processes. He also finished post-graduated peacebuilding program "Arts and International Cooperation" in Zurich University of the Arts in 2022 with thesis about methodology of Open Dialogues about Peace and International Peace Day in Ukraine celebration.

In 2018 Yaroslav Minkin became a fellow of Prague Civil Society Centre. With support of Igor Blaževič Minkin met influential activists from Eastern Partnership countries and later expanded his work to Central Asia. During his fellowship program, he developed thesis about influence of young generation on political decision-making process. Based on the study, Yuliya Lyubych and Yaroslav Minkin created script of the educational video about participation and democracy in Ukrainian context.

Since 2019, Minkin is leading a youth empowerment program for decolonization and post-war development Young Diversity Ambassadors with the aim to empower a new generation of independent young intersectional activists in Ukraine, their informal groups and emerging organisations, helping them to find their role in the post-war recovery and development, and to bring social changes into society.

== Civic activism ==
In February 2008 Minkin initiated a direct action. Active youth captured a tram in Luhansk. Local artists and flashmobers in masks, with toy weapons in their hands and in strange hats took over several trams, decorated the salons with paintings and drove along the route. Throughout the trip, the creative invaders urged passengers and passers-by to defend the city's tram park.

In 2010 Yaroslav Minkin switched his activity to civic activism and becaime active in Human Rights, after the summer school in Skadovsk, organized in a frame of the Ukrainian Helsinki Human Rights Union program "Understanding Human Rights". Together with human rights defenders Oleksandra Dvoretska and Konstantin Reutski he initiated a global campaign "Yellow card to Ukrainian militia". The aim of the campaign was to inform and empower youth to fight against human rights violations in Ukrainian law enforcement agencies (before creation of National Police of Ukraine). Students, civic activists held a campaign against illegal detentions, interviews, searches, and the use of force against young people by the policemen. The action was supported by southends of students from more than thirty educational institutions in Kyiv, Luhansk, Kharkiv, Chernihiv, Odesa, Mykolaiv, Zhytomyr, Simferopol, Ternopil, Rivne, Sevastopol, Yalta, Mariupol, and Kremenchuk. The campaign started as a request to the death of Ukrainian student Ihor Indyla in a police department in May 2010.

== Facilitation and non-formal education ==
During the last eight years, Yaroslav Minkin has been working as a trainer and facilitator on human rights, gender equality and non-discrimination, participatory democracy, cultural diversity, and intercultural dialogue. He is working as a trainer, facilitator and lecturer at trainings, workshops, seminars and forums for activists, educators and innovators, artists and cultural managers, IDPs and ex- combatants (ATO veterans), local politicians, police officers, and policy makers etc.

He started as a trainer of the Ukrainian Helsinki Human Rights Union program "Understanding Human Rights" in 2012. First he focused on freedom of assembly and gave a number of trainings based on his art, artivism and activism experience. Then Minkin became involved in the action to defend freedom of thought and diversity in general.

Goethe-Institut Ukraine in a frame of the Cultural Leadership Academy wrote:

Jaroslaw is the initiator of actions for solidarity, cultural and educational interventions and campaigns to protect the common good. He has a master's degree from the Institute of Leadership and Administration of the Ukrainian Catholic University and has conducted research in EU countries, Eastern Partnership countries and Central Asia. Yaroslav has worked as a Ukrainian consultant in the global project The Cultural Value Project and in innovation projects of the Goethe Institut Ukraine

In 2016 Yaroslav Minkin with a team of activists from Ukraine and USA developed virtual museum Luhansk Arts & Facts (virtual museum) - a platform, which that collect artefacts of cultural life and social activism of Lugansk from 2004 to 2013. Virtual bilingual (English and Ukrainian) hub is both online museum and archive of hidden cultural wave in Lugansk 2004 – 2013 years.

From 2018 to 2019 Minkin held the position of coordinator of the working group “People-to-People Contacts” of the National Ukrainian Platform of the Eastern Partnership Civil Societies Forum for the presentation of Ukraine at the international level. As a promoter of cultural diversity and respect for human rights, he has long been involved in the democratization of cultural policy in Donbass and Ukraine as a whole.

== Cultural mapping ==
Yaroslav Minkin is an expert in cultural mapping and community mapping methodology. He is consulting cultural institutions in Ukraine, Kyrgyzstan, and Moldova.

In 2012, he became a co-author of the "Cultural Map of Luhansk", that was created by STAN (youth organization) with mentorship of Centre of cultural management. A team of analysts, experts, cultural traders, journalists, designers, and translators explored the city's life to identify promising directions for the development of culture. The initiative included surveys of cultural consumers, focus groups with experts from various fields, analysis of the situation, and development of recommendations with the participation of US and EU experts.

In 2016 - 2017 Minkin worked as a trainer for community mapping and helped to develop 12 maps of small cities in Ukraine with support of European Union. Based on this experience Yaroslav Minkin, Yuriy Antoshchuk and Grzegorz Demel created a toolkit "Community Mapping in Ukraine". The publication reveals the methodology of community mapping as an effective means of identifying the potential of the community, more extensive involvement of residents in creating the image of their community, joint development of its strategy development, and establishment of a constructive dialogue with local government. The authors have developed step-by-step instructions for organizing the mapping process, relevant research and cartographic tools, and methods of using community mapping results.

During that year Minkin initiated a development of virtual museum about Luhansk. It was a collaboration between the Goethe-Institut and STAN (youth organization) with consultation from the Friedrichshain-Kreuzberg Museum in Berlin. The project «Luhansk’s Art & Facts» was a virtual platform where artists and activists collected аrtіfacts of cultural life and civic activism of Luhansk from the period of 2004 to 2013. The collection of artifacts in «Luhansk’s Art & Facts» reveal the unknown cultural wave of Luhansk 2004-2013. The virtual hub was available in both Ukrainian and English. It has been an online museum and archive simultaneously.

In 2018 first intercultural guide about Ivano-Frankivsk was created. Yaroslav Minkin together with other Youth organization "STAN" members and Peace Corps volunteer Kyle Logan created a guidebook, that shows the charms of the city of Ivano-Frankivsk, from the point of view of 12 non-locals. The main am was to show social and cultural benefits of diversity.

Also Minkin contributed to the Cultural Value Project as a regional consultant for Ukraine. The Cultural Value Project was a joint research project commissioned by the British Council and the Goethe-Institut and conducted by the Open University (UK) and the Hertie School of Governance (Germany). The project aimed to build a better understanding of the value of cultural relations in ‘societies in transition,’ with a focus on cultural relations activities in Egypt and Ukraine.

In 2019, in a frame of the project "Ukrainian Bouquet of People", Minkin and his team created intercultural guides for 4 Ukrainian towns - Drohobych, Kremenchuk, Lysychansk, and Melitopol. Based on cultural mapping methodology research team gathered stories of good neighborliness. Intercultural guides show ethnic, religious, and social diversity of the inhabitants. The mapping exercises involved IDPs and ATO veterans, representatives of ethnic and religious groups in the city, and youth and older people.

In 2022 - 2023 Yaroslav Minkin was involved in the cultural mapping process of the independent cultural sector of Moldova. Mapping initiatives included analyses of non-governmental organizations, art spaces, projects, and artists that are active in the independent cultural sector and free scene field. This workshops circle was organized by Coalition of the Independent Cultural Sector of the Republic of Moldova (Romanian: Coaliția Sectorului Cultural Independent din Republica Moldova) and Young Artists Association Oberlicht (Association) with the support of New Democracy Fund The workshops were held in Casa Zemstvei (House of Zemstvo) - an alternative cultural space in Chisinau that became the central platform for the independent cultural sector of Moldova in 2012.
