= AZV =

AZV may refer to:

- ICAO code for Azov Avia Airlines, defunct Russian airline
- ICAO code for Azur Air, Russian charter airline
