= Luhansk International Airport =

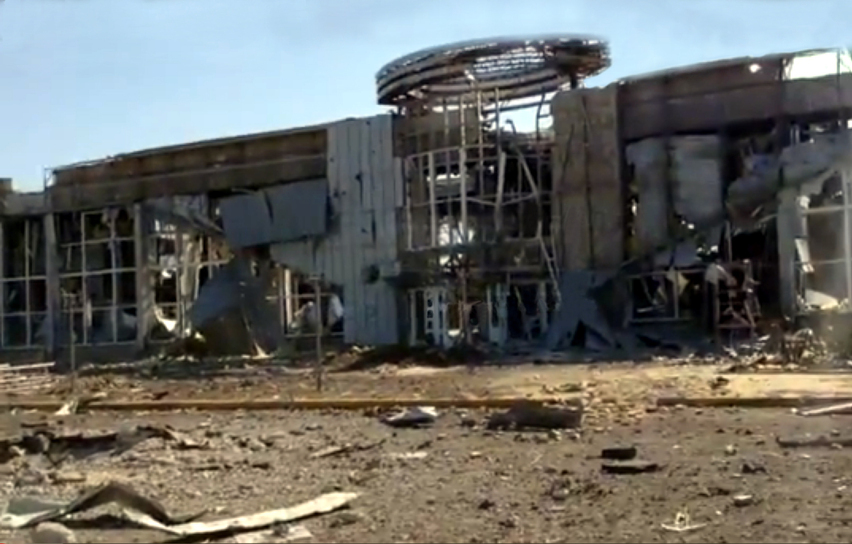
- The terminal of Luhansk airport after the battle ended in September 2014.
- IATA: VSG; ICAO: UKCW

Summary
- Airport type: Public
- Operator: Civil Government
- Location: Luhansk, Ukraine
- Elevation AMSL: 636 ft (194 m)
- Coordinates: 48°25′4.8″N 39°22′26.4″E
- Website: airport.lg.ua

Maps
- Location of Luhansk Airport in Ukraine
- Interactive map of Luhansk International Airport

Runways
Direction	Length		Surface
Direction	ft	m	Surface
09/27	9,318	2,840	Asphalt concrete
09/27	8,202	2,500	Soil

Luhansk International Airport (Ukrainian: Міжнародний аеропорт «Луганськ»; Russian: Международный аэропорт Луганск, romanized: Mezhdunarodny aeroport Lugansk) was an airport in Luhansk, Ukraine (IATA: VSG, ICAO: UKCW). The airport was located 20 km (12 miles) south of the city center, 9 km to the city limit. Since 11 June 2014, the airport has been officially closed. It was mostly destroyed during the war in Donbas. A project for a new airport has been unveiled by the Russian authorities and is expected to be completed by 2028.

== History ==
The history of Luhansk Airport begins in 1946, when in order to improve service in the regions, the Ukrainian SSR began work on the 285th aviation division at the site.

Luhansk Airport opened in 1964, with its construction accelerated by the involvement of multiple organizations in the Luhansk region.

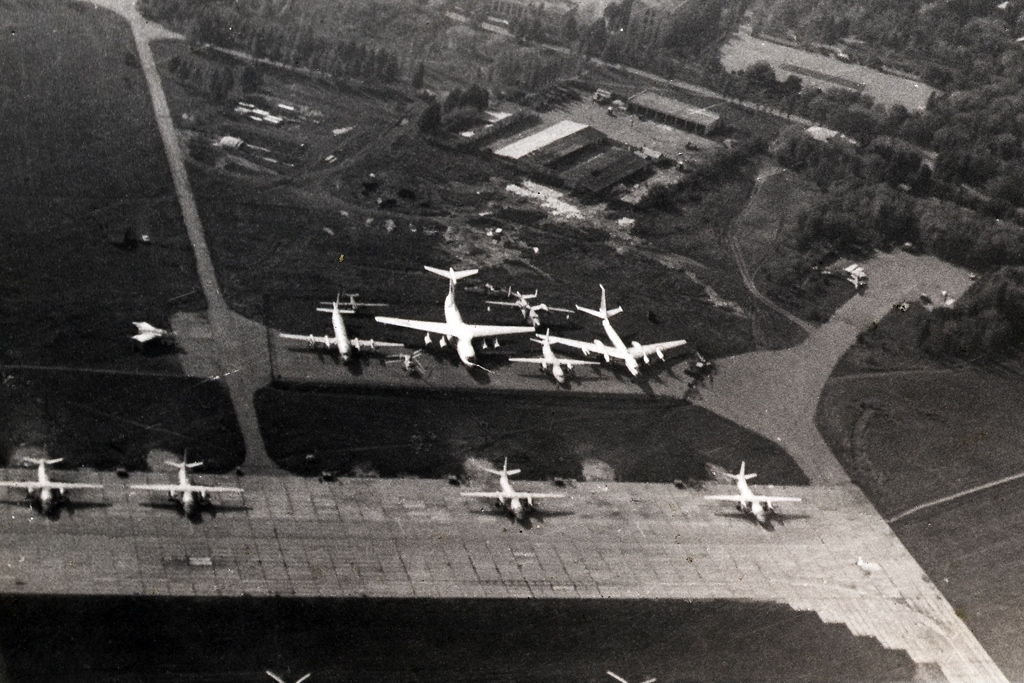
Luhansk Airport when it was operated by the Soviet Air Force, prior to the opening to the public in 1964.

In 1974 the airport established the 99th flying division including 6 AN-24 planes, and since 1989, 2 TU–154–B2 planes. By the 1980s there were 100 daily departures, going to almost 70 cities of the Soviet Union, transporting at least 1200 passengers.

Following the collapse of the Soviet Union, in 2005-2006, the airport and runway were reconstructed, allowing it to take AN-124 aircraft, Airbus A320’s, and Boeing 737’s. By 2013, there were regular scheduled flights to Kyiv, Moscow, and even charter flights to Turkey and Greece.

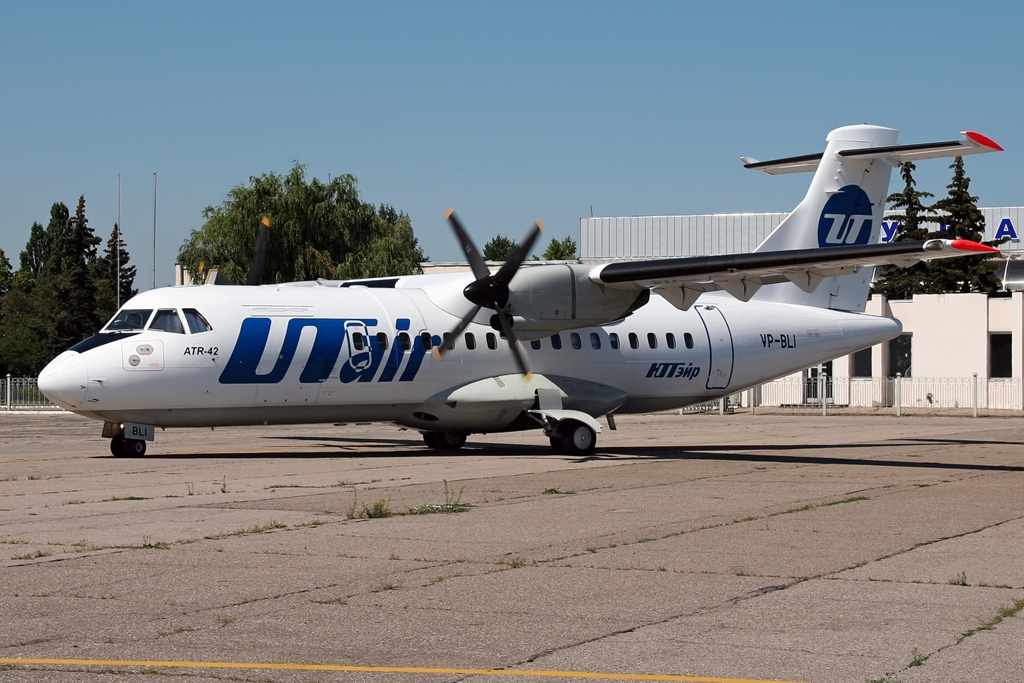
An ATR 42 parked at Luhansk Airport, with the terminal visible in the background.

=== Closure and destruction ===
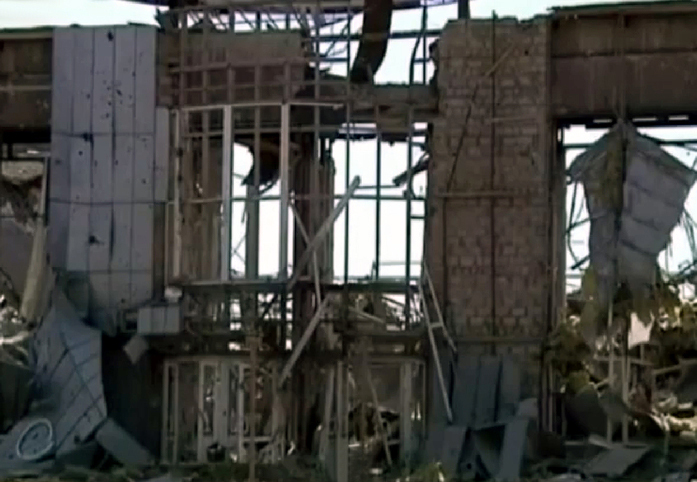
Main Entrance of Luhansk airport after the battle.

Due to the pro-Russian unrest in Ukraine, airports in the Donbas region were closed, including Mariupol, Donetsk, and Luhansk International Airports. As of April 2014, Ukrainian forces were stationed there as part of the Anti-Terrorist Operation against the Luhansk People’s Republic. A fierce battle for the airport started on June 8, 2014, when Ukrainian forces were blockaded at the site by LPR forces. On June 11, the airport was officially closed. The Ukrainian Military attempted to create an air bridge to supply the besieged forces using 3 Il-76’s from the 25th Transport Aviation Brigade, in which one Ilyushin Il-76 (Registration: 76777) was shot down on June 14, 2014, resulting in the deaths of 49 Ukrainians. On the night of September 1, the last remaining Ukrainian soldiers left the ruined airport, after 146 days of defending. On September 4, the airport finally fell to the separatists.

The airport terminal had been completely demolished by 2015, and eventually in 2019, a road was built over the rubble, where a museum of Luhansk People's Republic military equipment now sits on the runway.

In 2022, Russia reportedly set up a helicopter base on the site of former Luhansk International Airport. As of August 2023, the Russian Air Force has begun basing Kamov Ka-52 attack helicopters at the airport apron and runway, to help support its troops its ongoing invasion of Ukraine.

On October 17, 2023, as a part of Operation Dragonfly, the Ukrainian military struck the airport with MGM-140 ATACMS tactical ballistic missiles, leading to the destruction of multiple helicopters of the Russian Air Force.

== Airlines and destinations ==
From December 2009 to its closure in 2014, Luhansk International Airport was a base airport of the Ukrainian airline UTair-Ukraine.

Other airlines such as Ukraine International Airlines and Motor Sich Airlines also operated into Luhansk airport.

Defunct Ukrainian Airline Lugansk Airlines was based out of the airport before it declared bankruptcy in 2010.

Tavrey Airlines had operated into Luhansk Airport but declared bankruptcy in 2008.

== Accidents and incidents ==
- On 31 March 1971, an Antonov AN-10 (Registered CCCP-11145) Crashed due to structural failure of the starboard outer wing while descending from 12000 meters to 600 meters on approach to Luhansk Airport.
- On 14 June 2014, a Ukrainian Air Force Ilyushin Il-76 aircraft was shot down on approach to Luhansk, killing all on board (9 Crew and 40 Paratroopers). This was the most severe loss suffered by the Ukrainian military since the start of the pro-Russian conflict in February 2014.
- During the battle of Luhansk Airport, 2 Antonov AN-2R aircraft, Registered UR-33587 and UR-33590 were destroyed as a result of fighting between Luhansk People's Republic and the Armed Forces of Ukraine.

== See also ==
- Lugansk Airlines
- List of airports in Ukraine
- List of the busiest airports in the former USSR
- Sievierodonetsk Airport
