= NPP Start =

Russian aerospace company

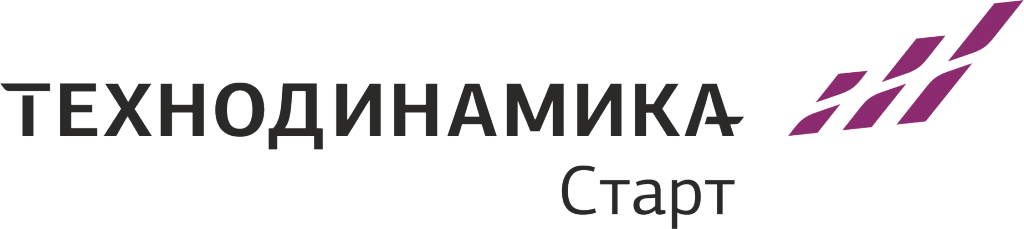
- Company type: Joint-stock company
- Founded: 1949
- Headquarters: Yekaterinburg, Russia
- Parent: Technodinamika (Rostec)
- Website: Official website

NPP Start - Start Machine-Building Design Bureau (Russian: НПП «Старт») is a company based in Yekaterinburg, Russia. It is part of the Technodinamika holding (Rostec group).

The Start Machine Building Design Bureau was a leading center for the design of launchers and ground support equipment for missiles and aircraft. The plant began to transition to civil production after the RK-55 (SSC-X-4) cruise missile, for which Start designed the launchers, was eliminated under the INF Treaty in the late 1980s.

Today, Start offers a wide range of military and civilian products and services. Civil products include aircraft body parts, aviation fueling equipment, food processing equipment, conveyor machinery, and sports equipment. Services include rocket test facilities and waste recycling. Start is affiliated with the Scientific Research Institute of Machine Building in Nizhnyaya Salda.

== Directors ==
CEO - Chernov Nikolay Sergeevich.
