= Stan =

Stan or STAN may refer to:

== People ==
- Stan (given name), a list of people with the given name
- Stan (surname), a Romanian surname
- Stan! (born 1964), American author, cartoonist and games designer Steven Brown
- Stan (singer) (born 1987), Greek singer, born Stratos Antipariotis

== Arts and entertainment ==
=== Fictional characters ===
- Stan Marsh, in the animated TV series South Park
- Grunkle Stan, in the animated TV series Gravity Falls
- Stan Beeman, in the TV series The Americans
- Stan Carter, in the British soap opera EastEnders
- Stan Ogden, in the British soap opera Coronation Street
- Stan Smith (American Dad!), in the animated TV series American Dad!
- Stan (Monkey Island), a salesman in the Monkey Island adventure games

=== Music ===
- Stan, a UK one hit wonder duo from 1993
- "Stan" (song), a 2000 song by Eminem, sampling Dido from The Marshall Mathers LP
  - Stan (fan), slang for a fan, often of celebrity culture and sometimes used in a negative way
- "Stan", a song by 6lack from East Atlanta Love Letter, 2018
- Stan (EP), by Stan Walker, 2018

== Science and technology ==
- List of storms named Stan, tropical cyclones named as such
  - Hurricane Stan, the deadliest hurricane of the 2005 Atlantic hurricane season
- Stanhopea (abbreviation Stan), an orchid genus
- Stan (dinosaur), a Tyrannosaurus rex fossil found at the Hell Creek Formation, South Dakota, US

=== Technology ===
- ST segment, analysis in electrocardiography
- Stan (streaming service), an Australian video streaming service
- Stan (software), a programming language for statistical inference
- System Trace Audit Number, a key to uniquely identify a card transaction based on the ISO 8583 standard

== Organisations ==
- STAN (art-group), a Ukrainian cultural organisation
- STAN (company), a Russian manufacturer
- Mayors and Independents (Czech: Starostové a nezávislí), a political party in the Czech Republic
- Sekolah Tinggi Akuntansi Negara, a state college in Indonesia
- Standard Chartered, British multinational banking and financial services company whose stock market symbol is "STAN"

== Places ==
- Stan, Mirna, a settlement in Slovenia
- Stan, a village and part of Vítanov in the Czech Republic

== Other uses ==
- Stan, "Stan" fans, excessively avid fans and supporters of a celebrity, TV show, group, musical artist, film or film series
  - Stan Twitter, a community of Twitter users
- Stan (horse), a British-American Thoroughbred racehorse
- -stan, a Persian suffix meaning "home of", "place of" or "country"
- Sino-Tibetan-Austronesian, a proposed language family
- Stan (administrative unit), a historical administrative unit in Russia

== See also ==
- Gamla Stan, the old town of Stockholm, Sweden
- Stanley (disambiguation)
- Stanly (disambiguation)
- Stano (disambiguation)
- Stanton (disambiguation)
