= Stăncești =

Stănceşti may refer to several villages in Romania:

- Stănceşti, a village in Vadu Pașii Commune, Buzău County
- Stănceşti and Stănceşti-Larga, villages in Mușetești Commune, Gorj County
- Stănceşti, a village in the town of Strehaia, Mehedinţi County
- Stănceşti, a village in Târgșoru Vechi Commune, Prahova County

== See also ==
- Stânceşti (disambiguation)
- Stanca (disambiguation)
