= Elektronika Central Scientific Research Institute =

Russian joint stock company

- Type: Joint-stock company
- Founded: 1964; 62 years ago
- Headquarters: Moscow, Russia
- Parent: Rostec

Elektronika Central Scientific Research Institute (Russian: ЦНИИ "Электроника") is a company based in Moscow, Russia. It is part of the Rostec holding.

Elektronika is responsible for providing information services to the electronics industry, as well as services involving the operation of control instruments and equipment for technological processes, laboratory equipment, measuring devices, and computer facilities. It also produces a variety of lasers and emitters.

== Operation ==
The main activities of the Institute:

- Preparation of information and analytical materials on the actual financial, economic and resource provision of organizations of the radio-electronic complex.
- Coordination and development of investment activities. The institute has created a database of investment projects designed to be implemented with the involvement of both domestic and foreign partners and investors.
- Development of proposals for the integration of domestic radio electronics into the global economy, identification of ways to further develop competitive electronic products.
- Development of the direction for the creation of an industrial intellectual property fund.

The institute is the lead developer organization of the "Strategy for the Development of the Electronic industry" until 2025, approved at a meeting of the Government of the Russian Federation, the State Program "Development of the Electronic and Radioelectronic Industry until 2025", as well as the Concept and the federal target program "Development of electronic component base and Radio electronics" for 2008–2015, approved by a decree of the Government of the Russian Federation dated November 26, 2007 No.809.
