= Stănculești =

Stănculeşti may refer to several villages in Romania:

- Stănculeşti, a village in Bulzeștii de Sus Commune, Hunedoara County
- Stănculeşti, a village in Fârtățești Commune, Vâlcea County

== See also ==
- Stanca (disambiguation)
