= Technodinamika =

Russian holding company

- Type: holding company
- Founded: 2009
- Headquarters: Russia, Moscow
- Key people: Maxim Kuzyuk (CEO)
- Revenue: $347 million (2016)
- Operating income: $17.6 million (2016)
- Net income: $10.2 million (2016)
- Number of employees: 13,283 (2016)
- Parent: Rostec
- Website: technodinamika.ru

Technodinamika, JSC Russian: АО Технодинамика ("Technodynamics") was established in 2009 in order to promote development, production and export of high-technology products for civil aviation markets. Originally established as Aviation Equipment Holding, it was given its current name in 2015.

== History ==
Technodinamika, JSC (Aviation equipment holding) was created in 2009 to promote the development, production and export of hi-tech industrial products for civilian purposes. The Holding incorporates 36 enterprises of aviation industry located all over the Russian Federation .

Nowadays, the company has a 51% share of the components market in the Russian aviation industry and manufactures more than 20000 products. The Holding's products are installed on almost every Russian passenger and cargo aircraft. In 2012 within the Holding was made a division for business development in the spheres of supply, repair and maintenance.

Sanctioned by the United States Office of Foreign Assets Control in December 2015 In January 2023 Japan imposed sanctions on AO Aviaagregat.

== Structure ==
The essential stage in forming of the corporate structure of Technodinamika became the delivery of shareholdings of the key developers and manufacturers of aviation systems and components to the Holding.

In December 2013, the Rostec in capacity of asset contribution delivered blocks of shares of 16 enterprises amounted to 8,4 billion rubles. Therefore, the state capital of the Holding increased in more than 8 times. In July 2014, the Holding received from the State Corporation shareholdings of other 10 enterprises-developers and manufacturers of aviation systems and assemblies for aircraft for civil. The total amount of the delivered shareholdings is about 3,4 billion roubles.

Thus, Technodinamika gradually comes to the operational management of the Holding, with the opportunity to form the completed cooperative chain between the enterprises, to optimize expenses and increase the effectiveness of the introduction of products to the market.

=== Subsidiaries ===
Structure of the holding:

- Ufa Research and Development Enterprise Molniya
- UAPO
- Gidravlika Ufa Aggregate Enterprise
- Ufa Design and Project Institute of aviation industry
- Leningrad Northern Plant
- Aviaagregat
- Gidroagregat
- Respirator Research and Development Enterprise
- Machine-Building Corporation MPO-Rumyantsev
- NII Parachutostroeniya
- Moscow Design and Production Complex Universal
- Znamya Moscow Machine Building Plant
- Mayak Machine Building plant
- Textile Research Institute
- Technodinamika Design center
- Aviation Service Center
- Electroprivod
- Aviation Technology and Production Management Irkutsk Research Institute
- Research and Development Enterprise Start
- Kotlas Electromechanical Plant

== Russian partners ==
Among the Holding's clients are such key Russian aircraft enterprises as Sukhoi, United Aircraft Corporation, Aircraft Corporation MIG, Ilyushin Aviation Complex, Tupolev Enterprise, Russian Helicopters Holding, Ministry of Defense, AVTOVAZ, airplane operators including Aeroflot, UTair etc.

In October 2012, the chief executive of UAC Mikhail Pogosyan announced cooperation with Aviation Equipment Holding to produce a competence center for takeoff and landing unit's complexation.

In 2013 within the MAKS Technodinamika and UAC-TA signed an agreement to supply of 39 equipment sets of on-board equipment and components worth 5 billion roubles.

In July 2014 Technodinamika and UAC launched the development of an electric wheel drive for Sukhoi Superjet 100 (SSJ-100)

Technodinamika cooperates with United Engine Corporation on creating equipment development for engine assembly and its modifications for Mi-28 helicopters as well as hospital aircraft Mi-17. Agreement is signed until the end of 2020.

== International cooperation ==
By 2020 Technodinamika plans to adjust supply situation of serial products on international market of aviation components in 2017. In line with its development strategy, Technodinamika is gaining developer and integrator competencies in 12 different aviation system segments, including landing gear, aircraft power supply, safety, and life sustaining systems, powerplants, hydraulic and fuel systems.

In 2013, Technodinamika (Aviation Equipment Holding) started integration into global aircraft branch by the partnership with global leaders in manufacturing assemblies and systems, by setting up several potential international projects.

Thus, in July 2013, The Holding signed an agreement with Curtis-Wright Controls on producing fire protection systems (FPS) in Russia.

November 27, 2015 Technodinamika says the test of the equipment, developed in co-operation with Curtiss-Wright Controls, has “fully confirmed” its declared capabilities.

The development was unveiled at the 2014 Farnborough Airshow and has no national prototypes. Fire protection system will beat all systems on national market. The system is 20% lighter and is more concise due to the construction of a new block and lightweight fire extinguishers. In addition, it is more reliable due to protection against false activation and may be installed on airplanes of different size and purpose, which reduces the unit cost and increases serial production. The system's modular design makes it possible to use the same components, therefore reducing production costs, while its service life will be at the same as that of the aircraft.

In August 2014, within the MAKS Air Show, Aviation Equipment and the Boeing Corporation signed an agreement on creating a working group for evaluating capabilities of manufacturing landing gear components and control systems for the Boeing Corporation airplanes. The third party that signed an agreement was the UTS Aerospace Systems Corporation-Boeing's current landing gear integrator. Aviaagregat – the Holding's enterprise in Samara plans to start a serial production of landing gear elements for the SSJ-100 in cooperation with the French company Messier–Bugatti-Dowty, the world leading aircraft landing gear manufacturer.

In February 2014, Technodinamika launched to prepare to realize projects in production localization of Canadian Bombardier Q-400 and Austrian Diamond.

On the occasion Farnborough International Air Show 2014 the Holding and French Company Microturbo (Safran) signed a Memorandum of Cooperation to create Auxiliary Power Unit (APU). In accordance with the contract terms both invest in development and industrialization of a new APU dedicated for helicopter market. Microturbo will design and develop main units and integrate the system. Aviation Equipment will develop the ignition system, electric starter, and electric generator and set up an assembly line of APU for the Russian aircraft.

Another important branch of Technodinamika is extension in after sales service market. Thus, in 2012 the first Aircraft Service Center (ASC) was opened in Moscow and in 2013 was opened the Distribution Center of airplane spare parts at Sheremetyevo Airport. ASC was created in cooperation with Boeing Company for organization an effective distribution system of spare parts, components and assemblies for aircraft models of Russian and foreign production in Russia and CIS countries.

In February 2014, Aircraft Service Center (ASC) and American company WENCOR opened the first consignment warehouse of components for aviation equipment at the center of distribution at Sheremetyevo Airport. Spare parts for Airbus A320 and Boeing 737 Classic and NG were included in the list.

== Production and perspective developments ==
The company's products are installed in virtually all Russian–made aircraft, such as the Tu-204/214, Il-114, An-148, Tu-154, Il-96, Yak-42; transport aircraft such as the Il-76, An-124, Be-200, Tu-204 and helicopters such as the Mi-8/17, Ka-32, Mi-26, Ka-226, Ansat, Mi-38, Ka-62. The Holding's systems and assemblies play an important role in military aviation. Many enterprises within the Holding are developers of unique products that have no analogues both in Russia and in the world.

For instance, Respirator Research and Development Enterprise is the developer of the Russia's first fully digitally controlled oxygen system for passenger planes.

On the exhibition "MAKS 2015" Technodinamika shows electric wheel for aircraft. Wheel saves fuel, time for taxiing and reduces noise at the airport. Electric wheel is used to move the aircraft on the ground. Through the use of an electric wheel, there is no need to include in the taxiing jet engines, which means you can save about 200 liters of fuel, reduce noise and emissions into the atmosphere.

Assembly Production Organization of Ufa (UAPO) developed an innovative system of DC power supply system SPTSu-7, 5 . The new power supply system with inverters with double energy conversion, which has twice as much power as former-generation system that were based on transformer converters. New system guarantees high resistance and stability of output voltage. Eventually, the system's modification is planned for installation in long-range aircraft MS-21 and later in all types of national airplanes and helicopters.

The Scientific Research Institute of Parachute Construction has built the D-10P system for extreme meteorological conditions, which is essentially an upgraded version of the serially produced D10 parachute system for airborne forces. It utilizes forced parachute deployment, which means that parachute opens automatically after a jump. The new system makes it possible to jump from as low as 50m, not 200m like before.

In July 2016 Tecnodinamika unveiled a new kind of parachute, especially designed for space landings. It was presented at the Innoprom International Industrial Trade Fair in Ekaterinburg

Zvezda Research and Development Enterprise has built the world's first helicopter emergency evacuation system, which is installed in Ka-52 “Alligator” and guarantees the rescue of the staff at all flying modes.

The same enterprise has developed the Orlan-MKS next-generation space suit for space-walks. The suit is computerized, with a new control panel display and an improved date processing system.

At MAKS 2013 Airshow enterprise demonstrated mail landing gear for perspective Ka-62 helicopter the uniqueness of its construction is combination of shock absorption and retractor in one assembly. Thus combined shock absorption retractor is small-sized and allows reducing of technical costs.

In 2013, the Technodinamika developed a series of full-scale and electronic mockups of aircraft systems for civil airplanes and helicopters which will enter mass production in Russia till 2025. Developments were made for MS-21, SSJ-100 airplanes and civil helicopters.

As the result were signed two contracts with the Ministry of Industry and Trade of creating mass production of eight aviation systems to replace foreign prototypes in terms of state program “The development of aircraft industry during 2013–2025 years” The total amount of investment from the state budget and personal Holding's facilities will be more than 1,4 billion roubles.

In addition, in terms of import substitution industrialization program FTP ‘Development of Civil Aircraft Equipment”, the Holding plans to create anti-abnormal fuel system and basic block of electrical generating system –DC generator.

In January 2014, Technodinamika proceeded to develop fuel system for promising Russian helicopters that is able to prevent fire burnt of aircraft. Fire safety is assured by keeping pressure-sealing of fuel system during crash landing and by using module for fuel tanks inflation with inerting agent.

At Farnborough-2014 one of the Holding's innovations was an innovative model APU-120 with the direct acting for MS-21 airplanes and Il-96MD-90A. APU is developing in accordance with “more electric aircraft” concept. APU-120 is more powerful than all Russian equivalents and the no gearbox solution decreases the number of parts in the APU-120 by 30% which in turn lowers the cost.

By 2015, Technodinamika will create the first Russian prototype of an innovative electric landing gear wheel drive for SSJ-100 jet and will hold its bench running. The role of the projects integrator will be given to one of the Holding's enterprises Aviaagregat,- one of the main Russian developers and supplies of landing gear for civil, transport and military aircraft. For this project, the Samara-based Aviaagregat set up an extensive network of cooperation with industry leaders.

In November 2015 Russian Technodinamika has carried out initial tests of the fire-protection system for the Irkut MC-21. Technodinamika says the test of the equipment, developed in co-operation with Curtiss-Wright Controls, has “fully confirmed” its declared capabilities.

In March 2016 Technodinamika claims that its development for the Aviadvigatel PD-14 engine is the first of its kind in the country, and will replace the usual hydraulically-driven systems.

Technodinamika (Russia)- is one of the key players operating in the commercial aircraft oxygen systems market

== Finances ==
The overall revenue of Technodinamika increased by more than 43% compared to the previous year and exceeded 20 billion roubles, the overall net profit rose by 81% (1 billion roubles). Also, in 2013, an investment program of the Holding was developed by the end of 2016, under which the scope of financial support to technical re-equip the enterprises would be more than 9,5 roubles.

In particular, production modernization has been started at NPP Start, Aviaagregat, MPO named after Rumyantsev, UAP Hydraulics, MMZ Znamya and MKPK Universal.

== Development strategy ==
The Holding's strategy expects to exceed revenue from 20 bln roubles in 2013 to 65 bln roubles in 2020 and exceed overall net profit from1 bln roubles in 2013 to 9,3 bln roubles by 2020. Considerably, about 7% of revenue will be allocated by R&D which means that annual expenses will be about 4,5 billion roubles by 2020. Overall volume investment of the Holding will be more than 70 billion roubles, 30 billion of which will be spent on R&D-and the same sum will be used to create system of aftersales service of Russian and foreign aircraft, 1, 5 billion roubles will be spent on realization IT technologies. These funds are planned to be raised by operating income, and federal target programs “Development of the Russian Civil Aviation” and “Development of Defense Industry”, credits and other resources. So far, Aviation Equipment Holding develop an integrator competence in nine aviation systems: power supply, landing gear, auxiliary power unit, hydraulic and fuel systems, oxygen system, fire protection system parachutes and airlift delivery, emergency escape and ground support equipment.

To expand and develop the presence in international market, Aviation Equipment is planning to add to the list hydraulic and fuel system. The Holding's presence as a second-level supplier will be kept in air conditioning system, saving equipment and flight controller. Important targets of the Holding to increase competitiveness of the Holding's products and integration into global aircraft industry is implementation of international quality standards EASA and enterprise's certification according to the world requirements for companies-manufacturers of aviation equipment.

Now Days, Aviaagregat plant in Samara confirmed that its quality management system complies with AS/EN 9100:2009 for aviation, space and defense enterprises. Ufa Research and Development Enterprise Molniya which is a part of Aviation Equipment Holding successfully completed certification audit quality management system ISO 9001 and AS/EN 910 for development, manufacture and test runs of aviation equipment. The sphere of standard certification includes development, manufacture and test runs of aviation equipment including igniting systems, subsystems of electronic management, safety and diagnostics of airplane's and helicopter's aero engines.

Other enterprises within the Technodinamika, Hydraulics in particular, are preparing to confirm certification by international standards.

Formation of competence centres has become an important step in efficiency upgrading. They allow uniting enterprises on the base of several single places by engineering and manufacturing capacity characteristics. АО Технодинамика plans to create competence centres in casting, instrumental and mechanic spheres. Nowadays, the pilot projects of technological clusters are successfully launched on the base of Ufa Assembly Production Association (UAPO) and Aviaagregat plant in Samara. In the future, Ufa Competence Centre will fully provide all Holding's enterprises with casting blanks and Samara Mechanical Treatment and Engineering Centre will establish an effective technological preparation of production and manufacturing of hydraulic cylinders and other products of mechanical production.

In June 2014, for the first time in Russia Technodinamika opened an engineering design center for civil and military aircraft that will unite all the regional design bureaus in one system. Thus, the whole products for airplanes from landing gears to APU will be presented to the buyer. The new aircraft system development time shall be increased by 30% and development cost shall be decreased by 1,5 times.

The design center headquarters is located in Moscow with branches in St. Petersburg (and later in Ufa and Samara on the base of design bureaus of holding enterprises). At the initial stage about 400 design-engineers will work in the center of competences.

== Social policy ==
In 2013, on the base of MIPT Aviation Equipment created the first in Russia educational program to prepare design engineers in the sphere of “High Technology Innovation Economics” Master's degree program is oriented on budding young engineers with experience about 3–7 years, whose gained knowledge will help to reach the new level of competitive products. In terms of this program, a course of master classes was made with the participation of leading experts of the branch and executives of international companies. Among these experts are: professor of aeronautics and astronautics and engineering systems at MIT, president of the Skolkovo Institute of Science and Technology (Skoltech) Edward Crawley, chair of the Venezuelan Node of the Millennium Project, research fellow at the Institute of Developing Economies in Tokyo and energy adviser at Singularity University (USA) José Luis Cordeiro and the author of non-verbal coaching method “5 rings system.” Stuart Heller.

In addition, Technodinamika prepares staff to implement innovative systems of administrating manufacture department and its enterprises. For instance, specialists of Ufa Research and Development Enterprise Molniya study “Strategic informational technologies maintenance service life of aviation product in high technology control”.

In terms of IV International youth industry forum “Engineers of the future 2014” Technodinamika and the Republic of Bashkortostan’s government signed a cooperation agreement. It stipulates interaction of parties in the sphere of preparing and skill improvement of engineers, including in USATU, and creating high-productive workspaces at the Holding's enterprises.
