= Stâna =

Stâna may refer to:

- Stâna, a village in Socond Commune, Satu Mare County
- Stana, a village in Almașu Commune, Sălaj County
- Stâna, a village in the city of Zalău, Sălaj County

== See also ==
- Stana (disambiguation)
- Stâna River (disambiguation)
- Valea Stânei (disambiguation)
- Stânca (disambiguation)
- Stan (disambiguation)
- Stanca (disambiguation)
