= Stanča =

Stanča is a Slavic toponym. It may refer to:

- Stanča, Slovakia, a village and municipality in the Trebišov District in the Košice Region of south-eastern Slovakia
- Stanča, Republic of Macedonia
- Stanča (Kraljevo), a village in Kraljevo municipality in Serbia

== See also ==
- Stanca (disambiguation)
- Stânca (disambiguation)
