= Scientific Research Institute of Parachute Construction =

Company based in Moscow, Russia

- Company type: Joint-stock company
- Founded: 1946
- Headquarters: Moscow, Russia
- Products: Parachute
- Parent: Technodinamika (Rostec)
- Website: niiparachute.ru

Scientific Research Institute Of Parachute Construction (Russian: НИИ парашютостроения) is a company based in Moscow, Russia. It is part of Technodinamika (Rostec group).

The Scientific Research Institute of Parachute Construction (NIIPS) is the primary organization for the research, design, development, and prototype production of all parachutes and parachute technology in Russia.

NIIPS has played a major role in parachute design and development for the Russian Space Program, including recovery parachutes for Soyuz, Buran, and Energia booster rockets and the Progress return capsule.

NIIPS also develops a variety of other products, including parachutes for both military and civilian applications, and equipment for the airline manufacturing and support industry.

== Main activities ==
The main activity of the Institute is inextricably linked with the development of aviation, rocket and space technology.

The Institute develops and creates all types of parachute systems, including:

- rescue;
- landing;
- sports and training;
- landing brakes;
- anti-corkscrew;
- cargo;
- for unmanned vehicles;
- landing of military equipment and combat crews;
- low-altitude landing;
- near and far space;
- head parts of missile systems;
- aviation and artillery ammunition.

== Directors ==
CEO - Dobryakov Denis Valerievich
