= Stănescu =

Stănescu may refer to:

- Cristian Stănescu (born 1951), Romanian politician and Member of the European Parliament
- Mircea Stănescu (1969–2009), Romanian Member of Parliament (2004–2008) and deputy
- Nichita Stănescu (1933–1983), Romanian poet and essayist
- Raphael Stănescu (born 1993), Romanian footballer
- Robert Stănescu (born 1985), Romanian artistic gymnast who specialized in still rings
- Saviana Stănescu, award-winning Romanian-American poet, playwright and journalist
- Valentin Stănescu (1922–1994), previously manager of the football team Rapid București

== See also ==
- Stadionul Giuleşti-Valentin Stănescu, football stadium in Bucharest, Romania and is the home stadium of Rapid București

== See also ==
- Stan (surname)
