= Yuri Pokalchuk =

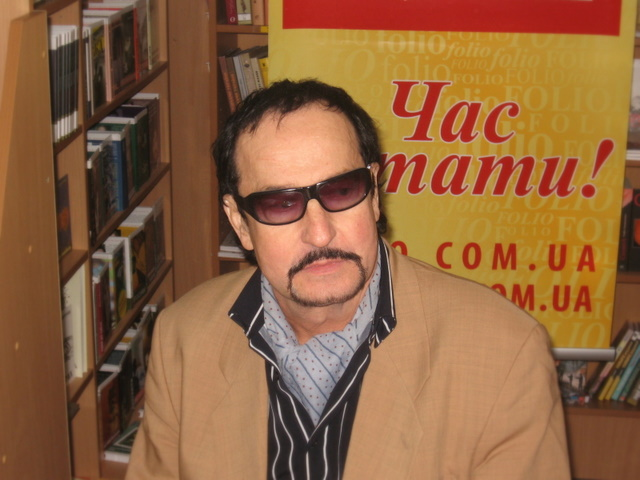
Yuri Pokalchuk

Yuri Pokalchuk was a Ukrainian writer, translator, researcher, candidate of philological sciences, and head of the international department of the Writers' Union of Ukraine. He was the older brother of the writer and psychologist Oleg Pokalchukand a member of the literary group "The Dogs of Saint Yur". Additionally, he was an organizer and leader of the musical group "Lights of a big city" which performed songs set to his texts.

== Biography ==
Yuri Pokalchuk was born on 24 January 1941 in Kremenets. His father was the dialectologist and local history expert Volodimir Pokalchuk. Pokalchuk's childhood and adolescence were spent in Lutsk, where he graduated from school and from the Lutsk Pedagogical Institute. Later he transferred to Leningrad University (Department of Oriental languages, Indology). Since 1969 he lived in Kyiv.

Since 1976 — a member of the Writers' Union of Ukraine.

From 1994 until 1998 — the head of the foreign branch of the Union of Writers of Ukraine.

From 1997 until 2000 — president of the Association of Ukrainian Writers.

From 2000 until 2002 — Member of the National Council on Television and Radio.

Since 2007 — a member of STAN (art-group).

Died from cancer on September 10, 2008, in Kyiv.

In the Soviet Union Pokalchuk was one of the first translators of the works by Jorge Luis Borges. Translated by Ernest Hemingway, J. D. Salinger, Julio Cortázar, Jorge Amado, Mario Vargas Llosa, Rudyard Kipling and Arthur Rimbaud and many others. He knew 11 foreign languages, including Polish, English, Spanish, and French. He published works of literary criticism, 5 poetry collections, 15 collections of novellas and short stories, the novel "And now, and always", and a book "Ukrainians in Great Britain". His work "Modern Latin American Prose" (1978) was in Soviet times the only Ukrainian-language monograph on Latin American literature.

== Works ==
- Who Are You?
- We have always
- Color tone
- CoffeeMatagalpa
- WonderfulTime
- Sabre and the Arrow (2003)
- Moderato
- Lake wind
- The fact that the bottom
- Taxi Blues (2003)
- Ring Road (2004)
- Forbidden Games (2005)
- Giddy smell Jungle (2005)
- Hooligans (2006)
- Do not step on Love (2007)
- Kama Sutra(Collected Works) (2007).

== Literary studies ==
- Lonely generation
- Towards a new consciousness
- Contemporary Latin American fiction.
