= Stankoprom =

- Type: Joint-stock company
- Industry: Engineering
- Founded: 2013
- Headquarters: Moscow, Russia
- Parent: Rostec
- Website: stankoprom.ru

Stankoprom (Russian: Станкопром) is a Russian designer and manufacturer of machine tools based in Moscow. It was established in 2013 on the initiative of the Ministry of Industry and Trade of Russia and Rostec State Corporation. as part as Russia's Import substitution strategy to reduce the country's reliance on foreign-made machine tools. It includes scientific centers as well as manufacturing plants. Stankoprom is part of the state-owned holding company Rostec, and it incorporates 14 machine tool manufacturers.

== History ==
Stankoprom Holding was established in 2013 on the initiative of the Ministry of Industry and Trade of Russia and Rostec State Corporation. Stankoprom is the parent organization of Rostec State Corporation.

== Operation ==
Stankoprom JSC, within the framework of Rostec State Corporation, has the status of a center for technological audit of technological equipment purchased by the corporation's organizations, as well as ensuring centralized supplies of machine tool products to the corporation's enterprises.

In October 2014 the Russian government decided to appoint Stankoprom as an engineering competence center and the locomotive of the process of introducing domestic machine tools into production.

In 2014 Stankoprom and the representative company of the German Siemens concern in Russia and Central Asia signed an agreement on cooperation in the development of complex high-precision machines, as well as the implementation of technical re-equipment projects for domestic enterprises. According to Sergey Makarov, CEO of Stankoprom, one of the main goals of the company is to create a joint venture with Siemens "with the mandatory transfer of the most modern machine tool technologies and localization of production in Russia."

In 2018 from the report of Prosecutor General Yuri Chaika on the state of law and order in Russia, it became known that Stankoprom holding had not made a single domestic machine tool in four years, thereby disrupting the program to create serial production of machine tool products, for which a large amount of money was allocated. In this regard, a criminal case was opened on the fact of embezzlement by fraud in a large amount of budgetary funds.

In May 2021 it became known about the signing of an agreement on the localization of production of mobile turning and milling complexes that have no analogues in Russia between Stankoprom and the German manufacturer TRAWEMA GMBH. The agreement implied a full range of production — from design to production of finished products on the basis of the "VNIIINSTUMENT" ("ВНИИИНСТРУМЕНТ") enterprise, which is part of the Stankoprom holding. Due to the sanctions, this agreement was not implemented.

== Structure ==
Structure of the company:

Scientific Centers

- Vniialmaz
- Vniiautogenmash
- Vniti Em
- Vniiinstrument
- Mikron
- Ulyanovsky Niat

Machine Manufacturing

- Savelovo Machine Building Plant
- Neftehimautomatika
- Remos-PM

Tools Manufacturing

- Instrumental Plant-PM

Trade and Engineering

- Foreign Trade Enterprise Stankoimport (Llc)
- Foreign Trade Enterprise Stankoimport (Ojsc)
- RT-Stankoinstrument
