= Stănuleasa =

Stănuleasa may refer to several villages in Romania:

- Stănuleasa, a village in Sâmburești Commune, Olt County
- Stănuleasa, a village in Vitomirești Commune, Olt County

== See also ==
- Stan (surname)
