= Lugansk Airlines =

Ukrainian airline

| IATA | ICAO | Call sign |
|---|---|---|
| L7 | LHS | ENTERPRISE LUHANSK |
- Founded: 2003
- Ceased operations: 2010
- Hubs: Luhansk International Airport
- Fleet size: 5
- Destinations: 3
- Headquarters: Luhansk, Ukraine
- Key people: Chairman Nemliher Anatoliy Viktorovich
- Website: www.avia.lg.ua/

Lugansk Airlines (Ukrainian: Луганські авіалінії, romanized: Luhanski avialinii) was an airline based in Luhansk, Ukraine. It operated services within Ukraine as well as the wet leasing of its aircraft. Its main base was Luhansk International Airport.

== History ==
In 1992, Air Ukraine was formed by the resources of various Ukrainian Aeroflot divisions, the Luhansk division being one of them. After Air Ukraine's bankruptcy, Lugansk Airlines became an independent company. In 2010, Lugansk Airlines ceased all operations due to bankruptcy.

== Fleet ==
The Lugansk Airlines fleet consisted of the following:

Illich-Avia Fleet
| Aircraft | In Fleet | Orders | Notes |
|---|---|---|---|
| Antonov An-24RV | 5 | 0 | |
| Antonov An-148 | 0 | 2 | |
| Total | 5 | 2 | |
