= Stâncești =

Stânceşti may refer to several villages in Romania:

- Stâncești, a village in Buntești Commune, Bihor County
- Stâncești, a village in Mihai Eminescu Commune, Botoșani County
- Stâncești, a village in Dobra Commune, Hunedoara County

== See also ==
- Stăncești (disambiguation)
- Stânca (disambiguation)
