= 25th Transport Aviation Brigade =

Military unit of the Ukrainian Air Force

- 25-та бригада транспортної авіації
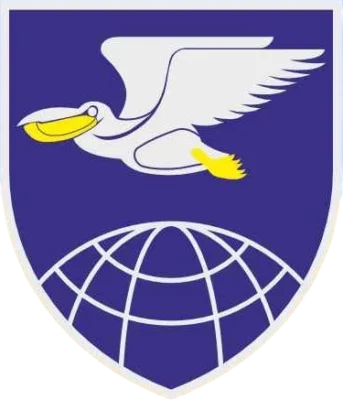
- Active: 1941 – present
- Country: Ukraine; Soviet Union (1941–1991)
- Allegiance: Armed Forces of Ukraine
- Branch: Ukrainian Air Force
- Type: Air Force Aviation
- Role: Transportation
- Size: Brigade
- Part of: General Air Command
- Garrison/HQ: Melitopol Air Base, Zaporizhzhia Oblast

Commanders
- Current commander: Colonel Dmytro Mymrikov

Insignia
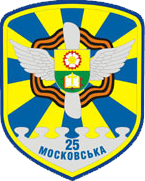
- Former sleeve patch

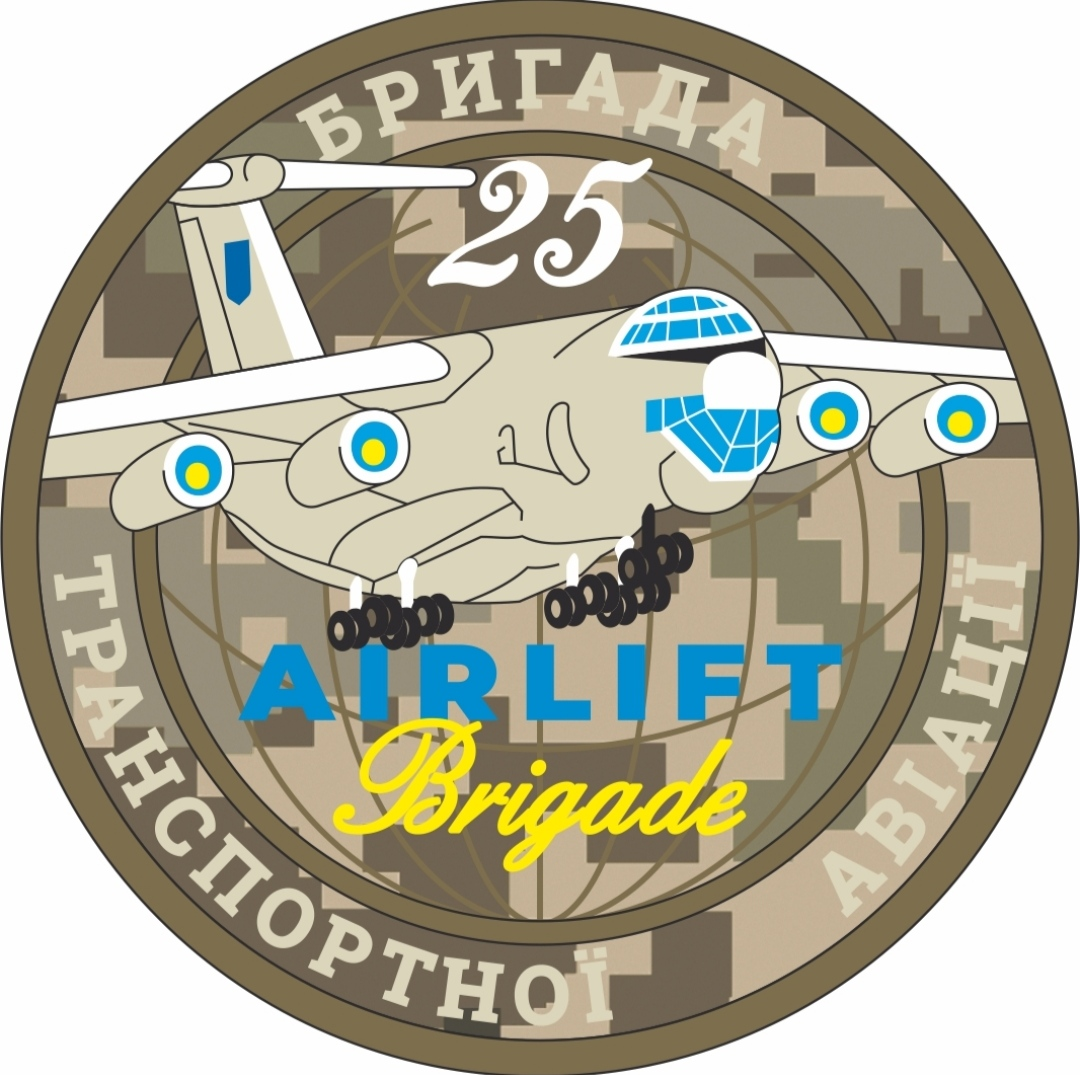
- Former Insignia

- Roundel

- Fin flash

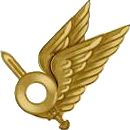
- Aviation branch insignia collar

Aircraft flown
- Transport: An-26, Il-76

The 25th Transport Aviation Brigade (MUN А3840) is a formation of the Ukrainian Air Force based at Melitopol Air Base.

== History ==
The unit was established as the 709 Night Bomber Aviation Regiment in Alatyr, Chuvash ASSR at the end of 1941. On 22 November 1942, it was renamed as 25th Guards Night Bomber Aviation Regiment, from 1946 — 25th Guards Transport Aviation Regiment.

In January 1992 the regiment took the oath of loyalty to the Ukrainian people.

It was an aircraft of the 25. Brigade that was destroyed in the 2014 Ukrainian Air Force Ilyushin Il-76 shootdown.

The brigade was ordered to withdraw from Melitopol on 24 February 2022, during the Russian invasion of Ukraine.

== Operations ==
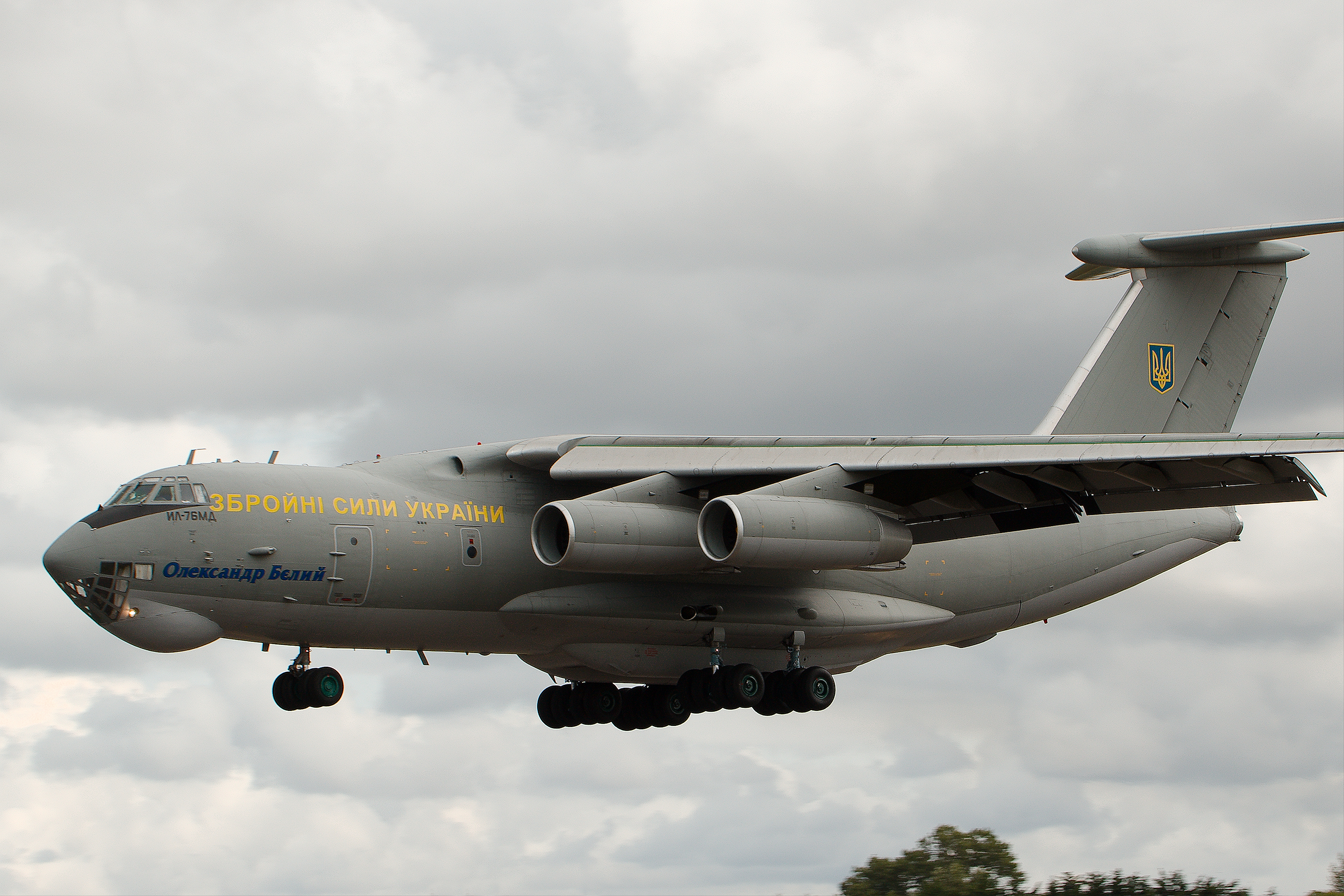
Il-76, bort number 76683, at RIAT 2019

- In 1993, 3 Il-76 aircraft of the Brigade delivered humanitarian cargo from Cologne to Tbilisi during a Ukrainian humanitarian mission in Georgia.
- Supported Ukrainian operations in UN missions in the former Yugoslavia (IFOR in Bosnia and Herzegovina, UNPROFOR and UNTAES in Croatia, KFor in Kosovo), the Middle East (Southern Lebanon, Kuwait, Iraq), and Africa (Angola, Sierra Leone, Liberia).
- Brigade was involved in a "Ukraine - North Pole - 2000" Ukraine parachute expedition to the North Pole in 2000.
- Operation "Northern Falcon" is a joint Ukrainian-Danish operation for the transportation of fuel from the US Air Force "Thule" to the Danish Polar Station "Nord" by the military transport aircraft IL-76MD. It has been conducted annually since 2009.
- Supported the evacuation of Ukrainian Citizens from Libya in 2011, in consequence of the civil war in Lybia.
- Supported the evacuation of Ukrainian Citizens from Syria in 2013.
- Supported the evacuation of Ukrainian Citizens from Nepal in 2015, as reaction to the earthquake in April.
- Airlift support to NATO operations in Mali.
- On 8 January 2020, transport aircraft of the 25th Transport Aviation Brigade IL-76 has flown out from the Boryspil International Airport to the crash site of the Ukrainian International Airlines flight which took place near Tehran, Islamic Republic of Iran.
- On 19 January 2020 the bodies of 11 Ukrainian citizens, who died in the crash, were returned to Ukraine in a solemn ceremony at the Boryspil International Airport. The coffins, which were each draped in a Ukrainian flag, were carried one by one from a Ukrainian Il-76 military plane.

== Aircraft ==
- An-26
- Il-76

=== List of aircraft ===
Tail Number	Type	Status	Note
UR-76322	Il-76	Destroyed in the ground by a Russian attack on Melitopol Air Base- 24 February 2025.	Aircraft was stored before its destruction.
UR-76697	Il-76	Captured by Russian Forces on Melitopol Airbase - 1 May 2022.	Stored in non-operational condition.
UR-76699	Il-76	Destroyed in the ground by a Russian attack on Melitopol Air Base- 24 February 2025.	One crewmember was killed on the ground.
UR-	Il-76	Operational aircraft stationed on Poland	
UR-	Il-76	Operational aircraft stationed on Poland	
UR-	Il-76	Operational aircraft stationed on Poland	
UR-	Il-76	Operational aircraft stationed on Poland	
UR-	Il-76	Operational aircraft stationed on Poland	
UR-	Il-76	Operational aircraft stationed on Poland	
UR-	Il-76	Operational aircraft stationed on Poland	

== Accidents ==
- On June 13, 2014, an IL-76 Transport was shot down, killing forty 25th Airborne Brigade troopers near Luhansk, Ukraine. “On the night of June 13–14, firing from an anti-aircraft gun and a large-caliber machine gun, anti-regime forces cynically and treacherously shot down an Ukraine armed forces transport plane IL-76 which was bringing personnel for rotation,” said in a statement posted on the Defense Ministry's official website.
