= Ukraine - North Pole - 2000 =

2000 Ukrainian Arctic expedition

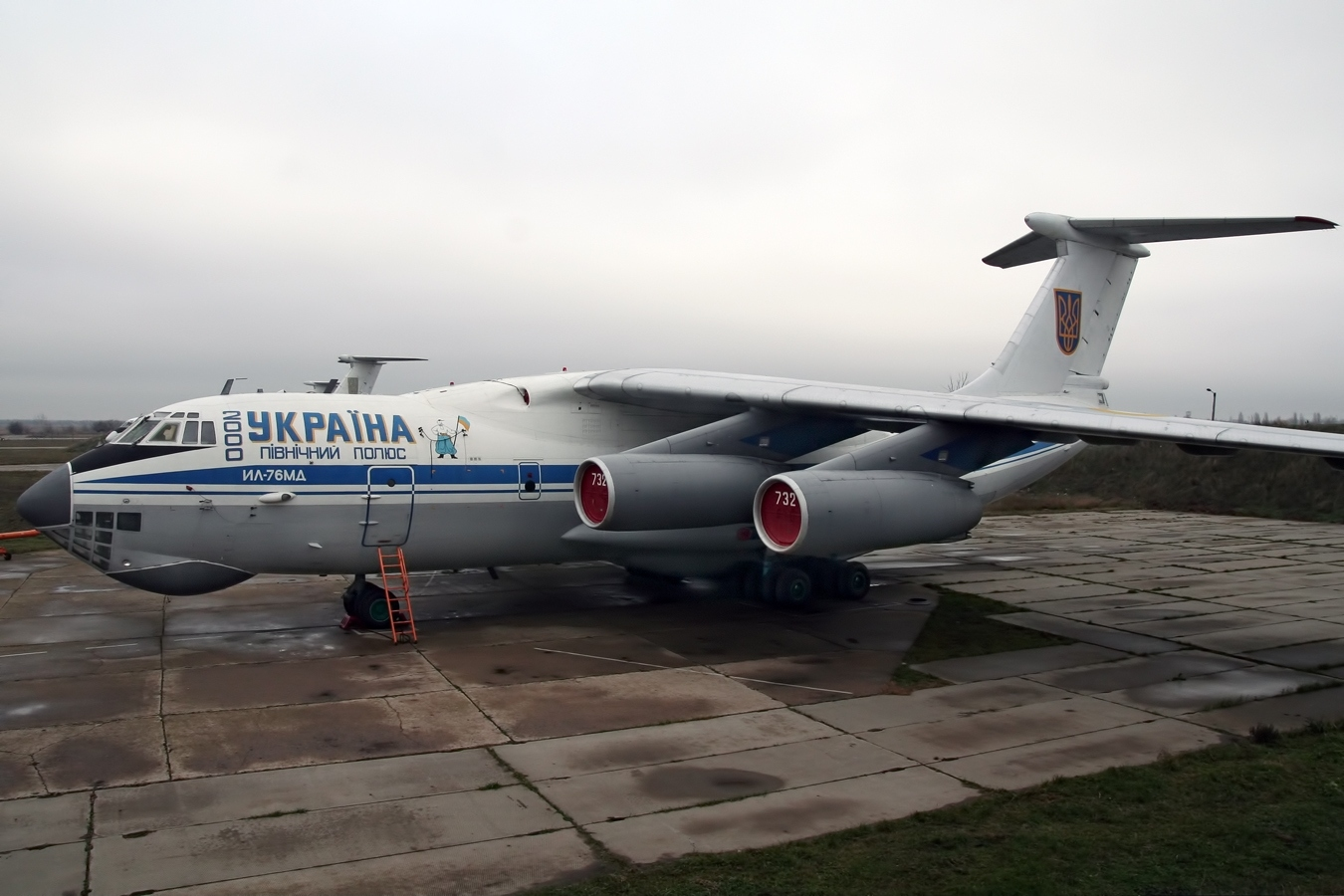
The Ilyushin Il-76 plane of the Ukrainian Air Force used in the expedition

Ukraine - North Pole - 2000 (Ukrainian: Україна — Північний полюс — 2000, romanized: Ukraina — Pivnichnyi polius — 2000) was an expedition to the Arctic conducted by Ukraine, taking place from 4 to 21 April 2000. Intended to prove Ukraine's competence in aviation and sports and the viability of domestically produced equipment, it was the first Arctic expedition conducted in Ukraine's history as an independent state.

Preparations for a Ukrainian expedition to the Arctic began in October 1999, led by People's Deputies Ivan Bilas and Heorhii Manchulenko (chair and deputy chair of the Federation of Aviation Sports of Ukraine, respectively). According to Manchulenko, the period between October 1999 and March 2000 included efforts to find domestic sponsors for such an expedition, to have sufficient equipment for harsh conditions supplied and to establish contacts with Russian authorities. A team of parachutists was trained at Kirovske air base in Crimea.

The expedition began on 4 April 2000, with an Ilyushin Il-76 plane of the Ukrainian Air Force and an Antonov An-28, which had been provided by Antonov on the condition that it was piloted by a test pilot from the company. Prime Minister Viktor Yushchenko bid The Il-76 crew first departed from their base in Melitopol to Boryspil International Airport and later to Kyiv Chaika Airfield, where they met up with the An-28 crew. While in Kyiv, they were given a farewell by Prime Minister Viktor Yushchenko on 8 April 2000, who presented them with an 18th-century Eastern Orthodox icon that had previously been brought to the Arctic. From there, the expedition travelled to Chkalovsky air base, where they were expected to be joined by a group of Russians. However, the money paid to Russia for the expedition was returned under unclear circumstances, forcing the Il-76's crew to live in a hotel for three days until the situation had been resolved.

From Moscow, the expedition flew to Khatanga Airport, from which they reached the Arctic. It was originally intended to reach the North Pole on 12 April. However, due to weather conditions, it was chosen to delay the mission until 15 April. The chosen landing point was a drifting ice floe near the North Pole, where the parachutists were dropped at 9:39. The landing was marked by temperatures reaching -50 degrees and winds of up to 10 m/s (36 km/h). The Il-76's equipment ceased functioning during efforts to land the plane and the pilots had to be directed by walkie-talkie in landing the plane. They were joined afterwards by the An-28. The flag of Ukraine was erected on the ice floe, as were the flags of the Ukrainian Air Force and the Ukrainian Navy (which had provided support to the expedition).

A total of 43 people participated in the expedition; of these, 22 were parachutists, six were crew on the An-28, 11 were soldiers of the Ukrainian Air Force and a further four served as a support group. Among the parachutists were Valentyna Zakoretska, a professional parachutist who held the Guinness World Record of most parachute jumps by a woman, intended to be among those parachuting, but broke her arm on the plane and was unable to do so.

The expedition came to an end on 21 April 2000. The Il-76 from the expedition has since been placed at Lutsk Air Base.
