= Stănești =

Stăneşti may refer to:

- Stănești, Gorj, a commune in Gorj County, Romania
- Stănești, Giurgiu, a commune in Giurgiu County, Romania
- Stănești, Vâlcea, a commune in Vâlcea County, Romania
- Stăneşti, a village in Poiana Vadului Commune, Alba County, Romania
- Stăneşti, a village in Corbi Commune, Argeș County, Romania
- Stăneşti, a village in Măgirești Commune, Bacău County, Romania
- Stăneşti, a village in Lunca Commune, Botoşani County, Romania
- Stăneşti, a district in the town of Răcari, Dâmboviţa County, Romania
- Stăneşti, a district in the town of Baia de Aramă, Mehedinţi County, Romania
- Stăneşti, a village in Stoilești Commune, Vâlcea County, Romania
- Stănești-Lunca, a village in Lungești Commune, Vâlcea County, Romania
- Stănești, the Romanian name for Stanivtsi, Chernivtsi Oblast, Ukraine

== See also ==
- Stan (surname)
