= Stana =

Stana may refer to:

- Stana River, a tributary of the Râul Cetăţii in Romania
- Stana (musician), real name Aram Alnashéa, Swedish musician, producer, songwriter
- Stana Katic, Canadian actress
- Stana Izbașa, Romanian folk music singer from Romania
- Stana Tomasević-Arnesen, politician in the government of Yugoslavia
- Daniel Stana (born 1982), Romanian professional football player
- Rastislav Staňa, Slovak ice hockey player

== See also ==
- Stâna (disambiguation)
- Stan (surname)
