= Stano =

Stano may refer to:

žena: Bianka Heringová

== People ==
=== Surname ===
- Angelo Stano (born 1953), Italian comic book artist
- Gerald Stano (1951–1998), American serial killer
- Jerome Stano (1932–2011), American senator of Ohio
- Massimo Stano (born 1992), Italian racewalker
- Marzia Stano, Italian singer
- Pavol Staňo (born 1977), Slovak footballer
- Tono Stano (born 1960), Slovak art photographer

=== Nickname ===
- Stano (singer) (real name Stanislav Stavitsky; born 1981), Russian-Lithuanian singer
- Stanislav Kropilák (born 1955), Czechoslovak-Slovak basketball player nicknamed Stano

== Places ==
- Stano, Kansas, United States

== See also ==
- Stanozolol, an anabolic steroid
