= Stânca =

Stânca may refer to several places in Romania:

Villages

- Stânca, a village in the town of Ștefănești, Botoșani County
- Stânca, a village in George Enescu Commune, Botoșani County
- Stânca, a village in Comarna Commune, Iași County
- Stânca, a village in Victoria Commune, Iași County
- Stânca, a village in Pipirig Commune, Neamț County
- Stânca, a village in Zvoriștea Commune, Suceava County
- Stânca, a village in Casimcea Commune, Tulcea County

Rivers and dams

- Stânca River, a tributary of the Agapia River
- Valea Stânca River, a tributary of the Bârzava River
- Stânca-Costești Dam, dam on the Prut

== See also ==
- Stanca (disambiguation)
- Stanča, a village in Trebisov District in the Kosice Region
- Stâncești (disambiguation)
- Stâncuța, a village in Suceava County, Romania
- Stânceni, a village in Mureș County, Romania
- Stâncășeni, a village in Vaslui County, Romania
- Stâna (disambiguation)
- Stan (disambiguation)
