= STAN (art-group) =

Ukrainian art community

- Known for: art

STAN (art-group) is the modern art community acting in Ukraine since 1999. Art-group «STAN» contributes the accumulation of creative forces of the region to overcome the cultural crisis and realization the creative projects. Location of group – Luhansk. Art-group «STAN» unites writers, philosophers, artists, journalists, educators and students. Founder of group - poet Alexander Sygida. Chairman of art-group «STAN» is Yaroslav Minkin. The structure of group also includes writer Konstantin Skorkin and poets – Elena Zaslavsky, Konstantin Reutskyy, Liubov Iakymchuck and Alexander Hubyetov.

Among the allies of the art-group - famous female skydiver Valentyna Zakoretska, writers Yuri Pokalchuk, Serhiy Zhadan and Andrei Hadanovych.

== Projects ==
=== Internet-portal «Tisk.org.ua» ===
Internet portal was created in 2002, as an informational resource of cultural life. The main goal of the portal is the highlighting of news of culture and cultural events in Eastern Ukraine. Peculiarity is its bilingual portal, so it promotes Russian-Ukrainian cultural dialogue. In Analytical Group of Portal includes professional lectures, researchers, journalists. The main principles of portal: use of interactive technologies(users can create their own pages (for placement of works of art, photos, etc.)); connect regional and global cultural context; create online community of artists and journalists, who specialize in cultural themes; The portal gives users access to next services: news of culture, which is updated by Analytical group and registered users; thematic areas (announcement, library, cinema, theater, etc.) Author's columns of cultural topics; All sections of the portal are open for discussion and comments.

=== Discussion Cinema club ===
Luhansk Regional Discussion Club of intellectual cinema was founded in February, 2008 by art-group «STAN» with group of enthusiastic cinema fans to promote progressive trends in cinematography. Meetings of the film club include expert selection, viewing and discussing films with the actual social issues. Repertoire to be brought for discussion by the experts (among them writers, philosophers, educators, journalists) and is determined by a democratic vote in the community of "Luhansk film society" in the popular resource "Vkontakte". Cinema club organized annual film-festival oriented on youth problems. Meetings are regularly attended by 50 to 200 people, festivals - more than 500 spectators.

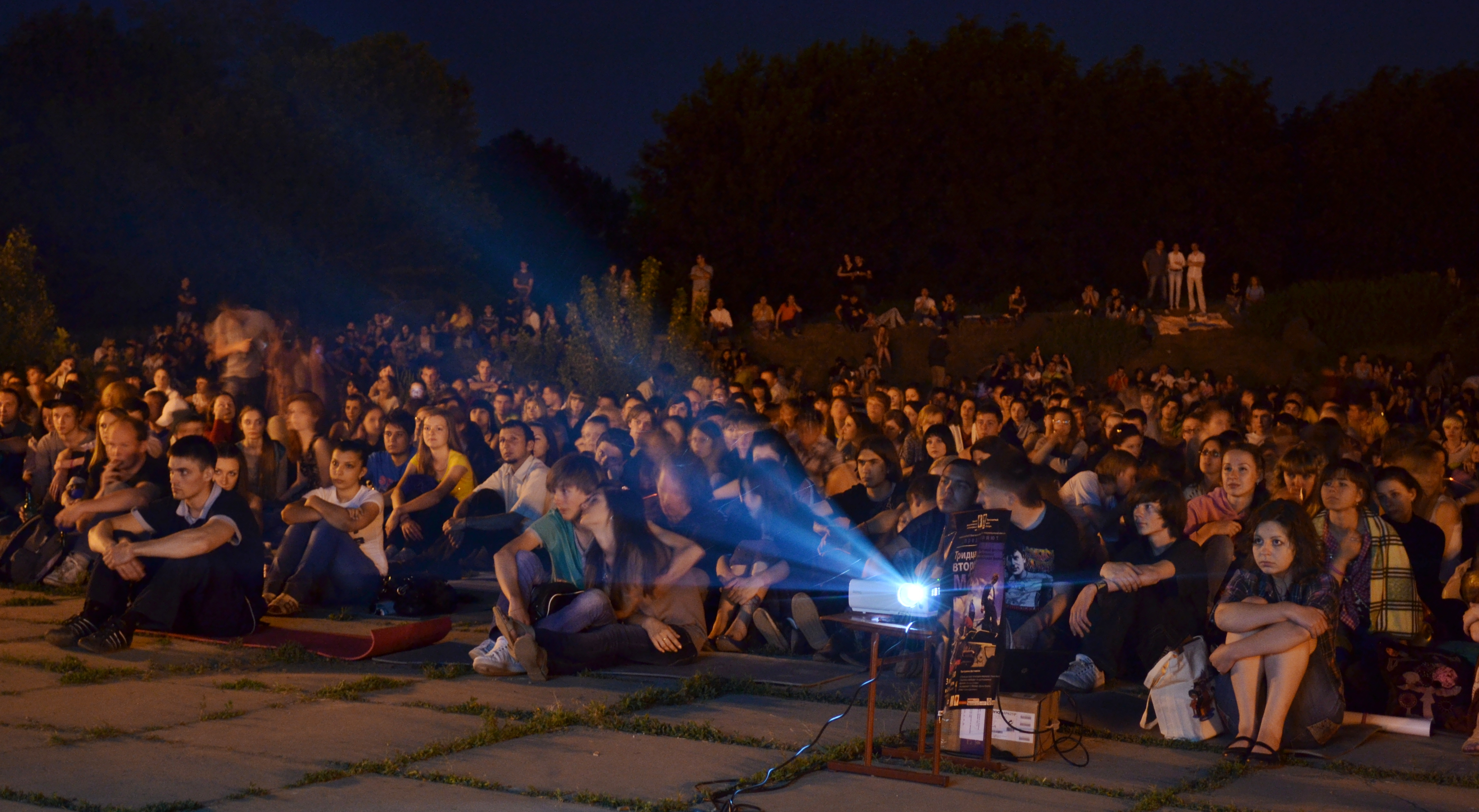
IV film festival "The 32 of May" in Luhansk, 2011

In the beginning Cinema Club just actualized problems of modern Ukrainian society, not proposing the solution of problem. An ain of the new step in the development of the Luhansk film club should be the forming of the collaboration between the cinema club and human rights defenders. Through this alliance, Luhansk cinema club will be a full-fledged platform for discussion and finding of strategies and mechanisms for solving social problems of the region, will bring together young people and teach them to effectively defend their rights and freedoms.

=== Cultural press-club in Luhansk ===
Ukrainian mass media in modern Eastern Ukraine prevails provincial mass media is not developed in cultural aspect. So we have a project, which is still in work "Cultural Step", so the purpose of project is to create a cultural press-club and to hold educational programs and to rise up professional level of cultural journalism of Luhansk and region and same way and to promote new media.

== Direct actions ==
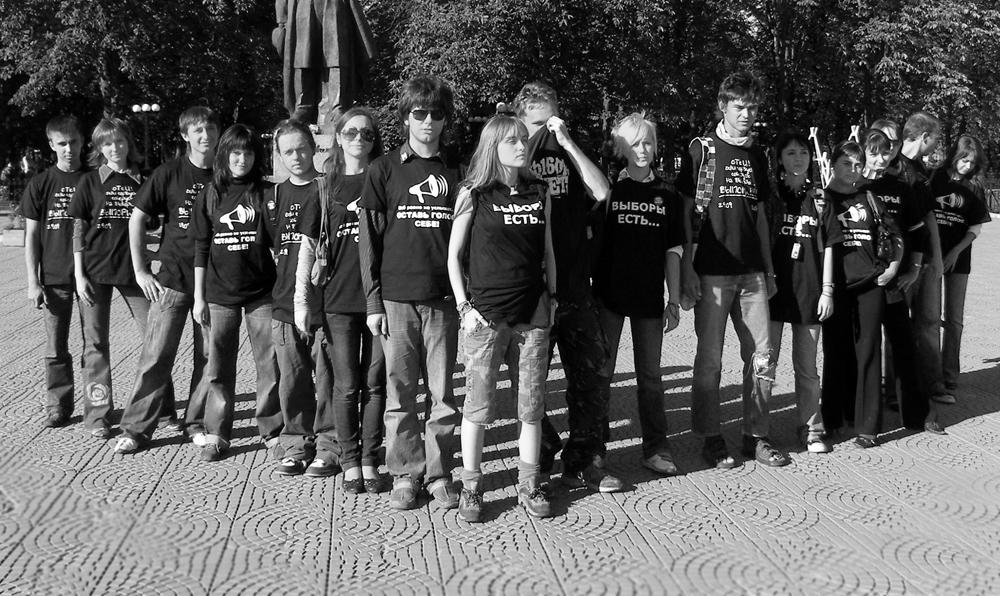
The boycott of elections in Ukraine, 2007

One of the priorities of art-group «STAN» is to organize protest actions aesthetic and cultural resistance.

=== 2002 ===
- Festival «Day of protection of vanguard art» with participation of young generation of Luhansk artists and writers.

=== 2003 ===
- The action «Anti-war meeting-concert against war in Iraq» together with social organisation "Postup".

- The action «the Charitable rock concert in favour of homeless children» together with S.O. "Postup".

=== 2004 ===
- The action «STAN for elections» together with «the Center of the political education»

- Festival «Fifth wheel». 13 rock groups from all Ukraine against fascism and xenophobia.

=== 2007 ===
- Festival «Colours of freedom». Art-group «STAN» and executive committee of the Luhansk City Council, on 8–9 September 2007, the Ukrainian festival antifascist graffiti.

- The action «Three-cylinder engine of love». Together with publishing house "Folio", on 11 October 2007, for the first time in Luhansk three whales of the modern Ukrainian literature Yurii Andrukhovych, Ljubko Deresh and Serhiy Zhadan.

- Festival «Ukrainian context». Literary grouping STAN, Welfare fund «Live tradition» and the Ukrainian Helsinki Committee under human rights, on 8–10 November 2007, displays of films of the Fourth international festival of documentary cinema about human rights.

=== 2008 ===
- Festival «tram Capture». On 29 February 2008, Art terrorist festival "Revolt", solemn sending of the first tram actual culture on a route: Factory OR – the Sharp Tomb – performances of poets, musicians and demonstration of works of artists directly in a tram.

- Festival «Belarus spring». Together with S.O. "Postup", on 16–17 April 2008 festival of modern Belarus culture.

- The action «Girls remove girls». Together with Luhansk branch of the National union of photo artists of Ukraine, on May, 14th, 2008, the Feminist poetic opening day – about 70 works of photographers of Luhansk, Donetsk, Kyiv, a body art, reality photo-shooting and a shock-show.

- Festival «Cinema under stars». On May, 31st, 2008, Night festival of social youthful films open-air, demonstration of the documentary and art films, mentioning problems of modern youth.

=== 2009 ===
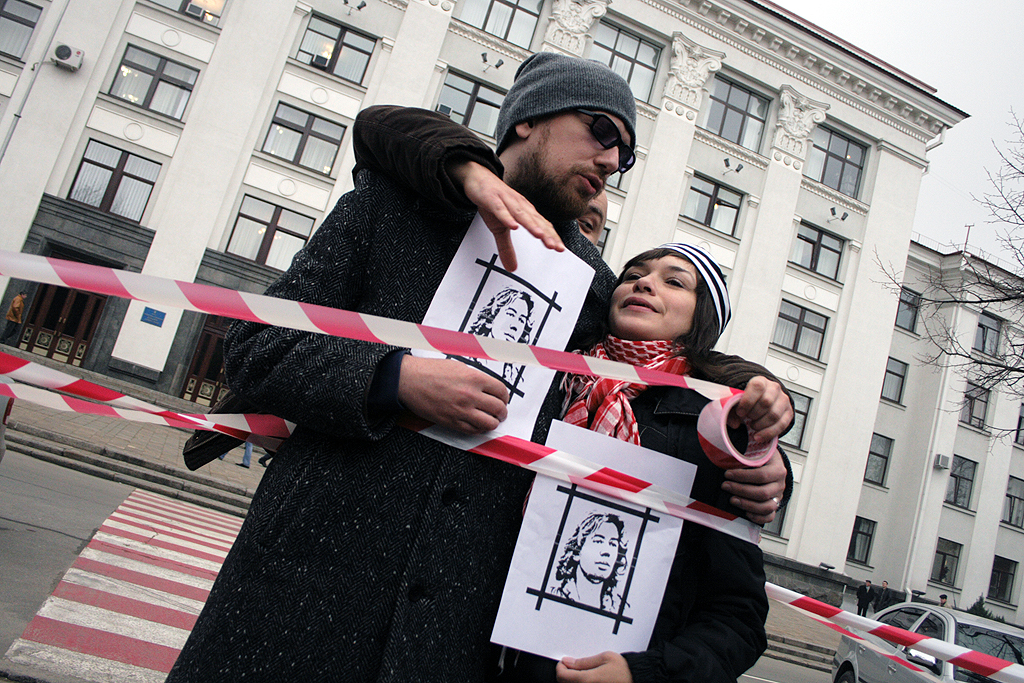
Support of political prisoners

- Festival «May, 32nd». The second night festival of social youthful films open-air, demonstration of the documentary and art films, mentioning problems of modern youth.

- The action «Hulyaimo razom!». On 26 August, an art party of poets from the West and the East of Ukraine with the assistance of Serhiy Zhadan.

- The action «silence Plot». On 30 November 2009, Ukrainian action in support of political prisoners.

=== 2010 ===
- The action «ask a question to the President!» Ukrainian flesh-mob with NGO association «New citizen».

- Action «STAN against Stalin». Flesh-mob against of rehabilitation of stalinism in Ukraine.

=== 2011 ===
- The Lessons of Troublemaking, Sabotage and Spying - The writers from STAN association have presented an anthology of social poetry in Luhansk.

== Sources ==
- Poems of Passion//Ukrainian week, October 7/2011
- International delegation of cultural managers visited Luhansk
- Far east Ukraine
- Art-group STAN: Myth or Reality?
- Art and LSD. Constantin Skorkin: "In the Ukrainian literature is just nothing to forbid!"
- Literary rebels Far East
- "По улицам Луганска расхаживала "ожившая мумия" Сталина". Komsomolskaya Pravda. 31 May 2010. Archived from the original on 2 October 2011.
