= Cultural mapping =

Research techniques to identify cultural assets

Sample of cultural mapping: Kuku Nyungkal cultural information system

Cultural mapping, also known as cultural resource mapping or cultural landscape mapping, refers to a wide range of research techniques and tools used to "map" distinct peoples' tangible and intangible cultural assets within local landscapes around the world. Institutions (including UNESCO) concerned about safeguarding cultural diversity use the term.

In its Universal Declaration on Cultural Diversity, UNESCO notes the importance of States adopting inclusive ways of encouraging cultural diversity...

Cultural mapping is also used to describe the use of research methods, tools, and techniques to identify, describe, portray, promote, and plan future use of particular regions' or cities' combined cultural assets and resources:

A broadly-based mapping exercise for purposes of investigating or creating an identity profile of the community is enriching, informative and useful ... The process of mapping by itself draws attention to the existence and importance of cultural resources. The results point out problems to be solved or strengths to build upon.

Cultural mapping is an emerging interdisciplinary field in which a range of perspectives are used as:

a mode of inquiry and a methodological tool in urban planning, cultural sustainability, and community development that makes visible the ways local stories, practices, relationships, memories, and rituals constitute places as meaningful locations."

== See also ==
- Cultural landscape
- Participatory GIS
- Cultural Planning
