= Gidroagregat =

- Company type: Open Joint Stock Company
- Founded: 1939
- Headquarters: Pavlovo, Russia
- Website: www.gidroagregat-nn.ru

Gidroagregat (Russian: Гидроагрегат), formerly Pavlovo Kadyshev Mechanical Plant, is a company based in Pavlovo, Russia. In 2017 the company had revenues of 4.8 billion rubles ($82.74 million).

The Pavlovo Kadyshev Mechanical Plant specializes in the series manufacture of hydraulic drive units and control systems for airplanes, helicopters, distribution mechanisms and devices, high-speed DC motors, gas batteries and cylinders and other equipment.

Products

- Power hydraulic and electromechanical actuators, and reciprocating hydraulic cylinders;
- Hydraulic units, control systems, and blocks for autonomous and mainline servo applications;
- Distribution mechanisms and devices, power amplifiers with electromechanical converters and direct control using flat and cylindrical spool valves;
- Hydraulic valves and feedback sensors;
- High-speed direct current motors;
- Gas accumulators and cylinders.
