= Valentyna Zakoretska =

Soviet and Ukrainian parachutist (1947–2010)

- Born: Valentyna Mykolaivna Zakoretska; April 30, 1947; Voroshylovgrad, Ukrainian SSR
- Died: July 9, 2010 (aged 63); Dnipro, Ukraine
- Occupation(s): parachutist, coach

Valentyna Mykolaivna Zakoretska (Ukrainian: Валентина Миколаївна Закорецька; 30 April 1947 — 9 July 2010) was a Soviet and Ukrainian athlete, parachutist, Honored Master of Sports of Ukraine, two-time absolute world champion, and holder of 50 world records.

== Biography ==
Valentyna Zakoretska was born on 30 April 1947 in Voroshylovgrad, USSR. Zakoretska started parachuting at the age of 16 in a group of parachutists at the Luhansk Aeroclub.

In 1970, she took part in the championship of Yugoslavia and became the champion. Then followed a series of victories and awards. From 1978 to 1984, Zakoretska was the coach of the Ukrainian parachute sports team. Later, she was a trainer-instructor in parachute training at Yenakiyiv State Air Sports Club.

Zakoretska trained 28 masters of sports of the USSR and Ukraine and four masters of sports of the international class.

Zakoretska took part in public movements and supported protest actions of the youth literary group STAN. She fought against illegal constructions in Luhansk in the area of the town of Luhansk Higher Military Aviation School of Navigators. Zakoretska was elected a deputy of the Luhansk City Council several times. She was a member of the executive committee of the City Council.

During her life, she performed 11,500 parachute jumps. Her name is listed in the Guinness Book of Records 1976, 1987, 1998 as a female parachutist with the most parachute jumps in the world.

Valentyna Zakoretska died on 9 July 2010 from acute heart failure before the competition at the Dnipropetrovsk airfield, where she was supposed to participate as a judge.

== Records ==
Zakoretska during her career was the only female parachutist in the world who performed more than 11,000 jumps. In 1976, her name was included in the Guinness Book of Records for the first time. The second record (10,000 jumps) was recorded in the Book in 1987, and the third – in 1998 for eleven and a half thousand jumps.

== Awards and honors ==
- Master of sports of the international class (1970).
- Three-time world champion (1970, 1972, 1976).
- Three-time absolute champion of the USSR (1971, 1972, 1975).
- Four-time champion of the Armed Forces of the USSR.
- Order of the Red Banner of Labor.
- Order of Princess Olga II class.
- Badge of honor of the Central Committee All-Union Leninist Communist Youth Union "Sports valor."
- Certificates and diplomas of the State Sports Committee of the USSR and Ukraine.
- Honored Master of Sports of Ukraine.
- Honorary citizen of Luhansk (2000).
