= STAN (company) =

Russian machine building company

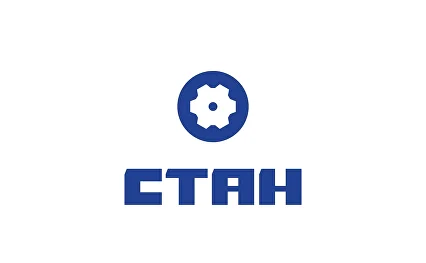
- Native name: СТАН
- Company type: Open Joint Stock Company
- Industry: Machine building
- Founded: 2012
- Key people: Boris Yurievich Bogatyrev (director general)
- Revenue: 2,300,000,000 Russian ruble (2018)
- Net income: 724,200,000 (2016)
- Owner: 1/3 state owned
- Number of employees: 1,761 (2015)
- Website: stan-company.ru

STAN is a Russian company for the design and manufacture of machine tool equipment. It is a part of Rostec conglomerate.

== History ==
In 2012, the formation of a machine-tool association began, for which purpose, at the end of the year, the company "STAN Group" was established. The name was changed to "STAN" in 2016.

In September 2012, a production site was established in Sterlitamak (Bashkiria) on the premises of the Sterlitamak Machine Tool Plant.

In November 2013, the STAN production site was established in Kolomna on the premises of the Kolomna Heavy Machine Tool Plant.

At the end of 2014, the Ryazan and Ivanovo machine-tool plants joined STAN.

In early 2015, the Moscow-based "Shlifovalnye stanki" plant, which was created on the basis of the Russian-German machine-tool joint venture Stankovendt, joined the company.

In 2016, the Savelovsky Machine-Tool Plant, created on the basis of the Savelovsky Machine-Building Plant, became part of the company.

In 2017, STAN and SP Donpressmash established a new production site – Donpressmash.

On May 20, 2025, the company was added to the EU sanctions list for "supporting Russia's military-industrial complex". The justification for the sanctions noted that the company had supplied a large consignment of equipment to Tupolev, participated in the technical re-equipment of the 123rd Aircraft Repair Plant, and had signed major contracts with key defense enterprises, including JSC Kuznetsov, Uralvagonzavod, and Admiralty Shipyards.

== Structure ==
The company includes the following production facilities:

- OOO NPO Stankostroenie (Sterlitamak, Republic of Bashkortostan)
- AO Stankotekh (Kolomna, Moscow Region)
- OOO Ryazan Stankozavod (Ryazan)
- OOO Ivanovo Machine-Tool Plant (Ivanovo)
- OOO Shlifovalnye stanki (Moscow)
- OOO Savelovsky Machine-Tool Plant (Tver Region, Kimry)
- OOO Donpressmash (Rostov Region, Azov).

== Activities ==
STAN's customers include companies in the aerospace, automotive, shipbuilding, railway, oil and gas, and other industries.

In 2017, according to Kommersant newspaper, STAN accounted for over 50% of the market for metalworking equipment manufactured in Russia and 16% of the total machine tool market.

== Ownership ==
OOO Investcon (66.58%), OOO RT-Capital (33.4%), Ruslan Valerievich Zvyagintsev (0.02%)

== Controversies ==
Since 2019, the company has been involved in a number of scandals, with regional and federal press reporting on fraud, equipment failures, and criminal prosecutions.

For example, a scandal erupted at the instigation of the Accounts Chamber of Russia regarding the manipulation of budget funds allocated to the company to rescue the domestic machine tool industry. Furthermore, partners accused the holding's owners of corporate raiding and dishonesty. An audit by the Accounts Chamber of the Industrial Development Fund revealed that STAN was using budget funds to manufacture substandard products. It also revealed fictitious import substitution. The FSB is conducting an investigation of the STAN Group following the Accounts Chamber's inspection.
