= Doamna Stanca National College =

Doamna Stanca National College (Romanian: Colegiul Național "Doamna Stanca") may refer to one of two educational institutions in Romania:

- Doamna Stanca National College (Făgăraș)
- Doamna Stanca National College (Satu Mare)
