= Melitopol Air Base =

Ukrainian Air Force base

Melitopol
- Melitopol, Zaporizhzhia Oblast in Ukraine

Site information
- Owner: Ministry of Defense (Ukraine) (de jure) Ministry of Defense (Russia) (de facto)
- Operator: Ukrainian Air Force (de jure) Russian Aerospace Forces (de facto)
- Controlled by: Air Force Command
- Condition: Damaged

Location
- Shown within Zaporizhzhia Oblast Melitopol (Ukraine)
- Coordinates: 46°52′36″N 35°18′27″E

Site history
- In use: Unknown - present
- Fate: Captured by Russian forces
- Battles/wars: 2022 Russian invasion of Ukraine

Airfield information
- Identifiers: ICAO: UKDM
- Elevation: 266 metres (873 ft) AMSL
Runways
Direction	Length and surface
04/22	2,470 metres (8,104 ft) Concrete

Melitopol (ICAO: UKDM) is an air base belonging to the Ukrainian Air Force located near Melitopol, Zaporizhzhia Oblast. It has been occupied by Russia since March 2022.

The base was home to the 25th Transport Aviation Brigade flying Ilyushin Il-76M/MD, Ilyushin Il-78 and Antonov An-26 aircraft.

Melitopol Air Base was bombarded early in the morning on 24 February 2022, as part of the initial Russian strikes on Ukrainian military bases in the early hours of the invasion. Cruise missiles hit the control tower, a fueling station, and an Il-76 preparing for takeoff, killing an aviation technician.

The base was captured by Russian forces on 1 March 2022 during the 2022 Russian invasion of Ukraine. On 3 July it was hit by Ukrainian rocket strikes.
