= Azov Avia Airlines =

Ukrainian cargo charter airline

IATA	ICAO	Call sign
-	AZV	AZOV AVIA
- Founded: 1996
- Ceased operations: 2004
- Fleet size: 2
- Headquarters: Melitopol, Ukraine

Azov Avia Airlines was a cargo airline based in Melitopol, Ukraine offering chartered flights using two Ilyushin Il-76MD aircraft. The airline was established and started operations in 1996, and ceased to exist in 2004.
