= Rostec =

Russian state-owned defense conglomerate

State Corporation for the Promotion of the Development, Manufacture, and Export of High Tech Products "Rostec"

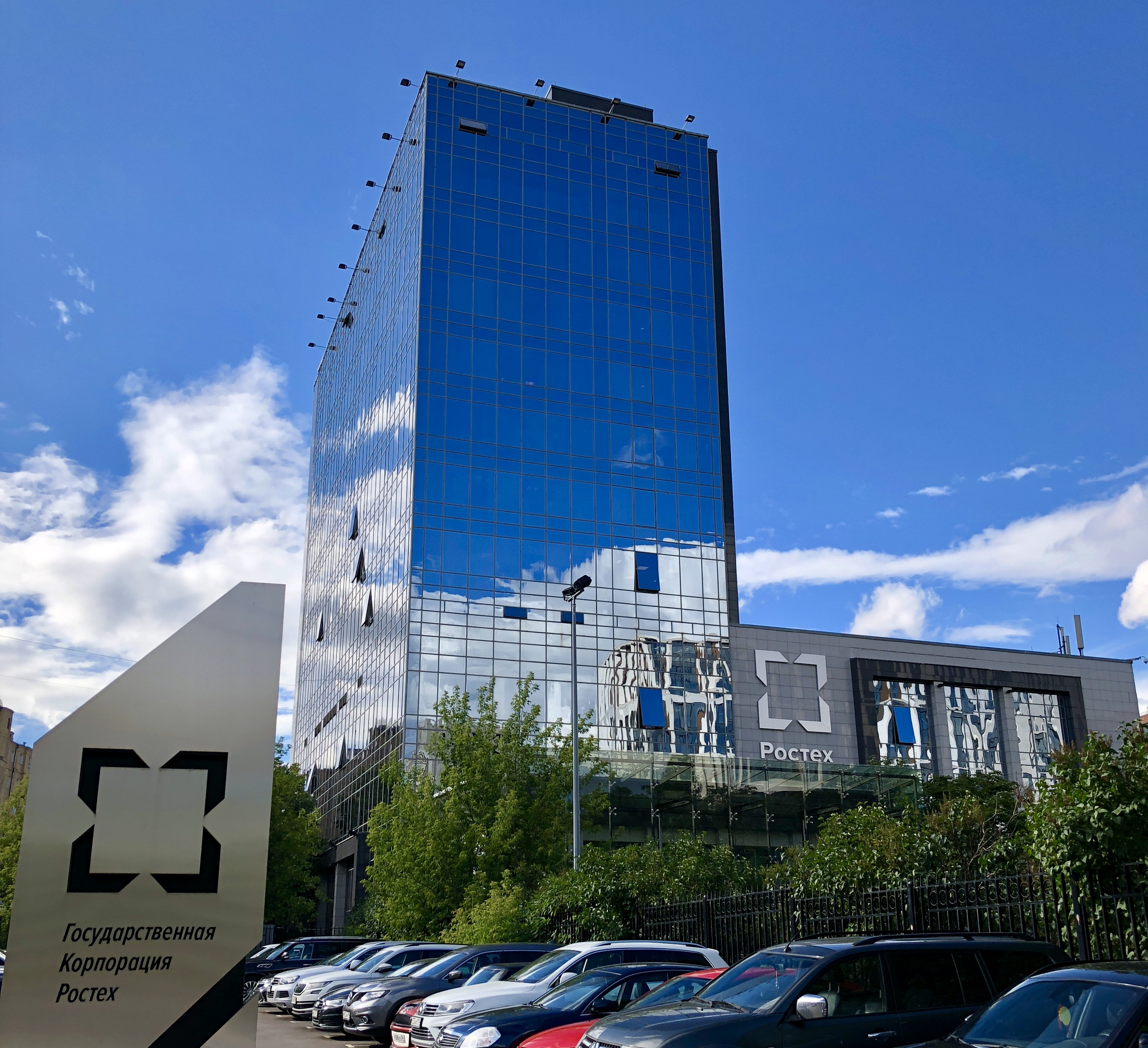
- Rostec's headquarters at 24 Usacheva Street in Moscow
- Trade name: State Corporation "Rostec"
- Native name: Государственная корпорация по содействию разработке, производству и экспорту высокотехнологичной промышленной продукции «Ростех»
- Romanized name: Gosudarstvennaya korporatsiya po sodeystviyu razrabotke, proizvodstvu i eksportu vysokotekhnologichnoy promyshlennoy produktsii "Rostekh"
- Formerly: Rostekhnologii
- Type: State corporation
- Industry: Conglomerate (ISIC: 6420)
- Founded: 23 November 2007; 18 years ago
- Founder: Vladimir Putin by signed law
- Headquarters: 24 Usacheva Street, Moscow, Russia
- Area served: Worldwide
- Key people: Denis Manturov (Chairman); Sergey Chemezov (CEO)
- Revenue: ▲$27.2 billion (2017)
- Operating income: ▲$4 billion (2016)
- Net income: ▲$1.31 billion (2016)
- Owner: Federal Agency for State Property Management
- Number of employees: 453,000 (2016)
- Divisions: Aircraft, Electronics, Armament
- Subsidiaries: See § Organization
- Website: www.rostec.ru/en

Rostec, (Note: Russian: Ростех, romanized: Rostekh) formally trading as State Corporation "Rostec", (Note: Russian: Государственная корпорация «Ростех») fully the State Corporation for the Promotion of the Development, Manufacture, and Export of High Tech Products "Rostec" (Note: Russian: Государственная корпорация по содействию разработке, производству и экспорту высокотехнологичной промышленной продукции «Ростех») and formerly Rostekhnologii, (Note: Russian: Ростехнологии, lit. 'Rustechnology') is a Russian state-owned defense conglomerate headquartered in Moscow.

Established in 2007, the organization comprises about 800 enterprises, which together form 15 holding companies: eleven in the defense-industry complex and three in civil sectors. Rostec's organizations are located in 60 constituents of the Russian Federation and supply goods to over 70 countries.

The organization is headed by Sergey Chemezov, appointed to the position by Russian president Vladimir Putin. The 2014 EU sanctions listing for Chemezov describes how Rostec subsidiaries supported Russia's annexation of Crimea.

== History ==
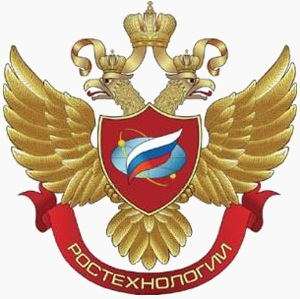
Logo of Rostekhnologii (2007-2009)

On 23 November 2007, Russian president Vladimir Putin signed federal law No. 270 to establish a state corporation named Rostekhnologii, which was previously passed by the State Duma on 9 November and passed by the Federation Council on 16 November.

On 10 July 2008, newly elected Russian president Dmitry Medvedev signed a decree that transferred 443 struggling enterprises to ownership by Rostekhnologii. Of these enterprises, 30% were in pre-crisis and crisis condition, 28 were in bankruptcy proceedings, 17 had no business operations, and 27 had lost part of their assets or faced a material risk of such loss, and in total they faced a debt of RUB630 billion. In addition, these enterprises had worn out fixed assets, dilapidated production chains, and poor management.

After the acquisition, structural reforms were made, helping the enterprises emerge from their financial struggles with a 20–30% increase in production growth, five times the national average. Most of the profits were acquired by Rostekhnologii, which 80% of it was from 20% of Rostekhnologii's assets. The 20% included AvtoVAZ, KamAZ, the titanium monopoly VSMPO-AVISMA, and helicopter manufacturers Mil and Kamov. This in turn brought executives of some companies into conflict with each other, such as the case with Mil and Kamov, in which they refused to communicate with each other. As a result, Rostekhnologii had to work with the two companies so they can cooperate with each other.

On 21 December 2012, Rostekhnologii rebranded itself as Rostec to make the corporation more open to the world. Rostec also featured a new logo, an open square symbolizing a window to the world and a focus frame, as well a new slogan "Partner in development" and implemented changes in its corporate governance structure. The corporation spent $1.5 million for rebranding. The corporate brand, which was launched in late 2012, is currently one of Russia's 15 most valuable brands and has a value similar to that of major companies such as Rosneft and Rostelecom.

On 16 July 2014, as a result of Russian intervention in Ukraine and Russian annexation of Crimea, Rostec was one of the companies that was sanctioned by the Obama administration. Sergey Chemezov, then CEO of Rostec, was one of the individuals targeted by the United States (US) and the European Union (EU), Chemezov's visa was banned and assets frozen by the EU. Rostec's access to US debt markets was also limited. Rostec was forced to rethink its strategy for its holding companies.

In December 2015, Rostec's supervisory board approved its development strategy through 2025. According to the strategy, Rostec intends to change the Russian economic model by putting less emphasis on weaponry, aviation components, and software and more emphasis on electronics, telecommunications, robotics, and other high-tech industries. This in turn would diversify the Russian economy, increasing the share of high-tech civilian products and non-primary exports.

According to the 2022 development strategy of the corporation, by 2025 the share of civilian products in its revenue should be 50%.

It was reported in late 2022 that Rostec had increased the production of armored vehicles and ammunition in response to the 2022 Russian invasion of Ukraine.

Rostec announced on 5 January 2023 that it would commence mass manufacture of new C-UAS EW systems in two months.

Chemezov stated in May 2023 that the company's revenue in 2022 was $27.2 billion and the share of civilian production was 45%.

It was reported in August 2023 that Rostec's enterprises had increased the production of armored vehicles by 4x and the production of ammunition for barrel artillery and MLRS by 20-30x since February 2022.

It was reported in September 2023 that Rostec's enterprises had increased the production of various types of weapons 2-to 10-fold.

Sergey Chemezov claimed on 1 November 2023 that Rostec has increased tank production by 7x, other combat vehicles by 4.5x, artillery/MLRS by 2.5 times, and ammunition by 60x.

Rostec reported in April 2024 that during the previous year it had increased the production of self-propelled artillery by 10x, towed artillery by 14x, mortars by 20x, MLRS by 2x, of ammunition by 25x (by 50x for some types), of rounds for automatic and under-barrel grenade launchers by 5 times at comparison with the 2022. It also enhanced the production and repair of tank guns and artillery barrels twice, organized the production of munitions for drones and increased the production of guided artillery rounds and gliding bombs.

Chemezov stated in May 2024 that the Corporation employed more than 660,000 people as of the end of 2023 and its revenue was 2.9 trillion rubles (31.6 bln US$). A Rostec high-ranking official stated in August 2024 that Russia's total export orders for weapons exceeded 60 bln US$.

On the night of 8–9 November 2024, Ukrainian drones attacked the Rostec's Aleksin Chemical Plant in the Aleksinsky District, about 190 km (120 mi) south of Moscow, causing a series of explosions and fires at the plant. The plant manufactures ammunition and explosives for the Russian military.

The company started to produce IGLA anti-drone cartridges in 2026.

On 18 June 2025, Sergey Chemezov reported to Russia's president Vladimir Putin that Rostec increased production of light armored vehicles and tanks by 1.1 times in 2024 at comparison with 2023 and also increased production of ammunition.

The company begun deliveries of the new Dvina-100M anti-drone system in September 2025 to guard large factories and transport hubs.

In late November 2025, Sergey Chemezov said that the production of shells for barrel artillery rose by 10 times and for MLRS by 12 times since February 2022.

In January 2026, Rostec started to supply the Russian Army with multi-bullet anti-drone ammunition and the Zubr anti-drone systems.

Rostec told TASS it has increased the production of artillery ammunition by 20 times and the production of tank ammunition by 50 times while it has doubled the production of combat aircraft since February 2022.

Rostec signed a contract for the supply of 90 Yakovlev MC-21 aircraft to Aeroflot on 18 September 2026.

Rostec started supplying and advertising the Citadel anti-drone artillery system in 2026.

== Corporate governance ==
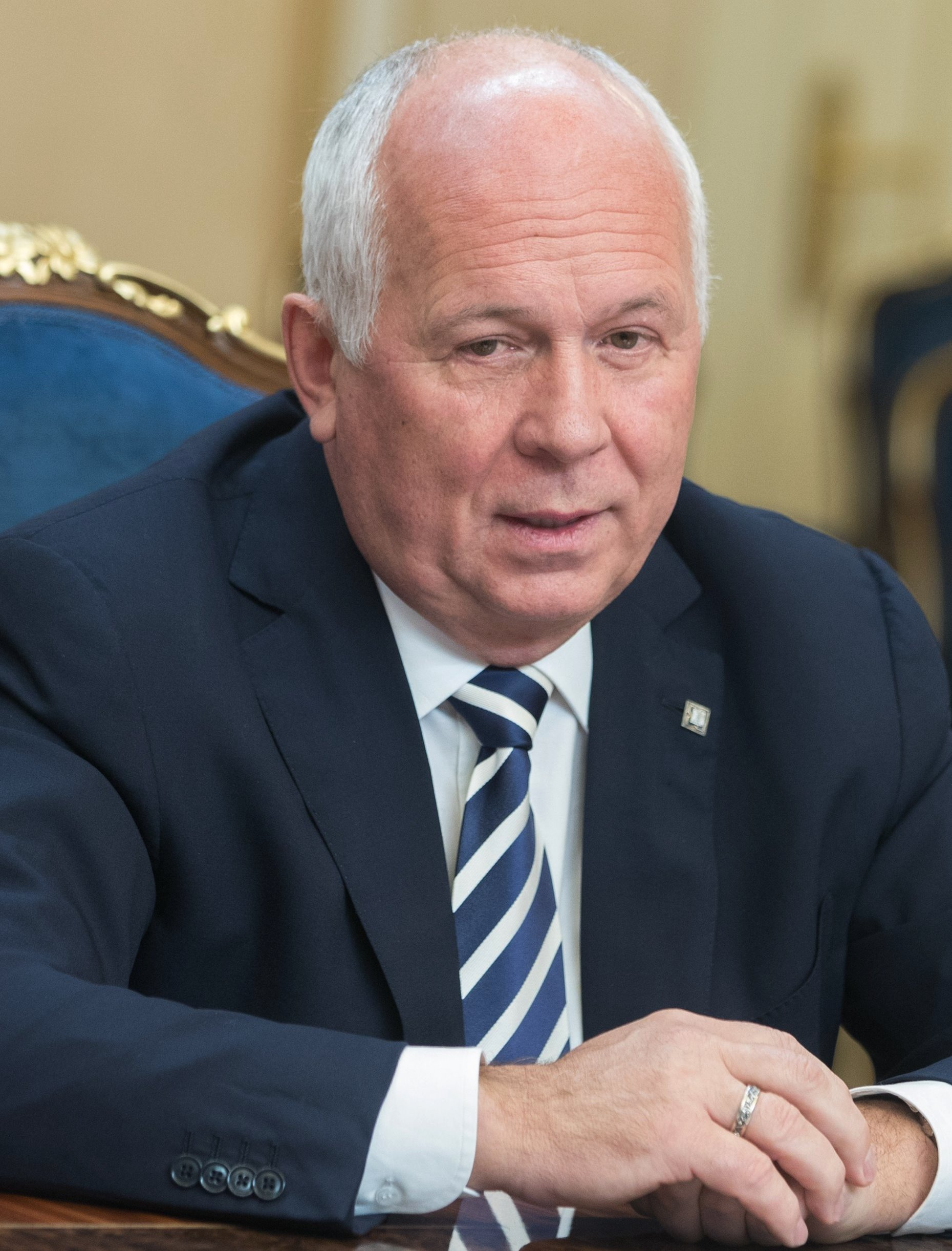
Sergey Chemezov, current general director/CEO of Rostec since its founding

The supervisory board, the management board, and the general director are all appointed by the president of Russia.

=== Supervisory board ===
- Sergey Chemezov – General director (CEO) of Rostec
- Sergey Ivanov – Special Representative of the president of the Russian Federation on the Issues of Environmental Activities, Environment and Transport
- Denis Manturov – Russian minister of industry and trade
- Yury Borisov – Deputy Prime Minister of Russia for Defence and Space Industry, Russian deputy minister of defence
- Larisa Brychyova – Aide to the President of Russia and head of the Presidential State-Legal Directorate
- Igor Levitin – Aide to the President of Russia
- Anton Siluanov – Russian minister of finance
- Vladimir Ostrovenko – Deputy chief of the presidential administration
- Dmitry Shugaev – Director of the Federal Service for Military-Technical Cooperation

=== Management board ===
- Sergey Chemezov – General director (CEO)
- Vladimir Artyakov – First deputy general director
- Nikolay Volobuev – Deputy CEO
- Igor Zavyalov – Deputy CEO of finance
- Aleksandr Nazarov – Deputy general director
- Dmitry Lelikov – Deputy general director for investment activity
- Oleg Yevtushenko – Executive director
- Sergey Kulikov – Industrial director of electronics
- Anatoly Serdyukov – Industrial director of aviation
- Sergey Abramov – Industrial director of conventional armament, ammunition and special chemistry
- Viktor Kiryanov – Managing director of infrastructure projects
- Vladimir Litvin – Managing director of direct administration
- Maksim Vybornykh – State secretary
- Alla Laletina – Head of legal department
- Yury Koptev – Chairman of the Scientific and Technical Council
- Natalya Borisova – Head of bookkeeping and fiscal accounting

=== Scientific and Technical Council ===
- Yury Koptev – Chairman of the science and engineering board, Doctor of Technical Sciences
- Vladimir Verba – General director, general director of JSC Concern Vega, Doctor of Technical Sciences
- Valery Gheykin – Deputy general director, general director of JSC ODK, Doctor of Technical Sciences
- Vladimir Gutenev – First deputy chairman of the Industry Committee of the State Duma, First vice-president of the Union of Machine Builders of Russia. Doctor of Technical Sciences
- Yury Demchenko – Chairman of the science and engineering board, chief adviser of the general director, head of the Group of Advisers of Rosoboronexport
- Givi Dzhandzhgava – Deputy general director of JSC KRET for on-board equipment R&D, General Designer, Doctor of Technical Sciences (until 2021)
- Nikolay Ivenev – Advisor to the general director of JSC High-Precision Complexes on scientific and technical policy, Candidate of Technical Sciences
- Valery Kashin – Deputy general director of JSC High-Precision Complexes – General Designer of JSC NPK KBM, Doctor of Technical Sciences
- Alexandr Komarov – Head of the Department of Coordination and R&D of JSC Russian Electronics, Candidate of Technical Sciences
- Aleksandr Kuznetsov – Director of the direction of science, engineering and innovative development of JSC Stankoprom, Doctor of Technical Sciences
- Alexandr Kulikov – Deputy general director for research of the Interdepartmental Center for Analytical Research in Chemistry, Physics and Biology under the Presidium RAS, Candidate of Technical Sciences
- Valery Litvinov – Chairman of science and engineering board, adviser to the general director of JSC RT-Khimkompozit, Doctor of Technical Sciences
- Yury Maevsky – Deputy general director of JSC KRET for radioelectronic combat equipment R&D, general designer of the radioelectronic combat system, Doctor of Technical Sciences
- Vladimir Tikhonov – First deputy general director of Techmash, Candidate of Technical Sciences
- Nikolay Turko – Senior consultant of the general director of Rostec, Doctor of Military Sciences
- Andrey Shibitov – Deputy general director for production of Russian Helicopters
- Anatoly Filachev – General director of JSC Orion, corresponding member of RAS
- Viktor Shchitov – First deputy general director – chief engineer of TsNIITochMash, Doctor of Technical Sciences
- Grigory Elkin – First deputy general director of JSC OPK, general designer of automated control and communication systems, Doctor of Economic Sciences

=== Social policy ===
==== Labor ====
The Rostec companies employed about 450,000 people as of 2016. A special focus of the corporation's responsibility on labor involves 21 dominant employers that are part of Rostec. As an example of corporate activity aimed at stabilization of social environment in single-company towns, mass media covered Rostec's labor policy in relation to AvtoVAZ, a dominant employer in Togliatti during the 2008-2009 economic crisis. Despite large-scale layoffs, public unrest was prevented by a special employment program for dismissed workers. The unemployment rate in the company town of Verkhnyaya Salda, Sverdlovsk Oblast, which is owned by VSMPO-AVISMA, was less than 1% in 2013.

==== Health ====
In order to implement its Health National Program, the corporation has set up nine centers for high medical technologies. Five centers for cardiovascular surgery (Khabarovsk, Krasnoyarsk, Chelyabinsk, Perm and Kaliningrad), two centers for neurosurgery (Tyumen and Novosibirsk) and two centers for traumatic surgery, orthopedics and endoprosthesis replacement (Smolensk and Barnaul).

Rostec is a participant in the Perinatal center development program along with Russia's Ministry of Health, the Federal Compulsory Medical Insurance Fund and federal member state authorities.

As of March 2017, Rostec had built and equipped perinatal centers in 15 federal subjects of Russia:

- 6 republics: Bashkortostan, Buryatia, Dagestan, Ingushetia, Karelia and Sakha (Yakutia);
- 9 oblasts: Archangelsk, Bryansk, Leningrad, Orenburg, Penza, Pskov, Smolensk, Tambov and Ulyanovsk.

==== Education ====
Rostec cooperates with 312 leading higher educational institutions, including, among others, Bauman Moscow State Technical University, and the Plekhanov Russian University of Economics, through targeted training of specialists, development of cooperation in the framework of scientific and technological areas, joint research, design and technological work. There are 294 departments belonging to holding companies and enterprises under Rostec in these institutions. In 2015, Rostec started 165 projects in collaboration with these institutions at a cost amounted to 2.8 billion rubles.

=== Sponsorship ===
On November 27, 2007, Rostec became general sponsor of FC Krylia Sovetov Samara; however, in 2011 the corporation decided to suspend its support of the team. In 2010 and 2011, Rostec sponsored Vitaly Petrov, Formula One racing driver. In 2012, Russian Helicopters partnered with Caterham F1Team for which Petrov drives. Improving professional training of the employees, Rostec cooperates with the WorldSkills movement. In 2015 the Corporation and WorldSkills Russia concluded a cooperation agreement which is aimed mainly at the joint work on training specialists for high-tech industries. State Corporation Rostec is a general partner of WorldSkills Russia in accordance with a three-year agreement.

== Organization ==
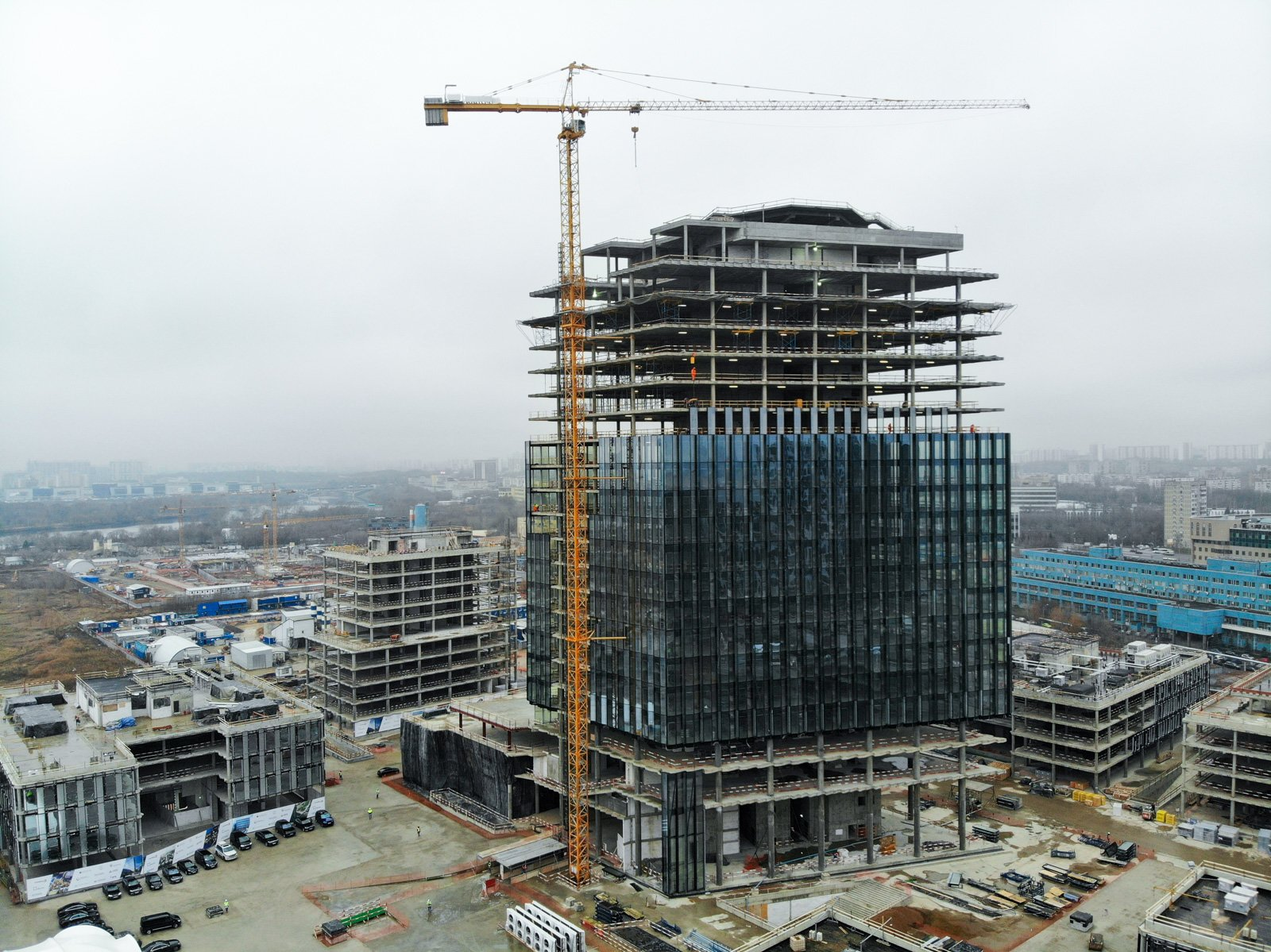
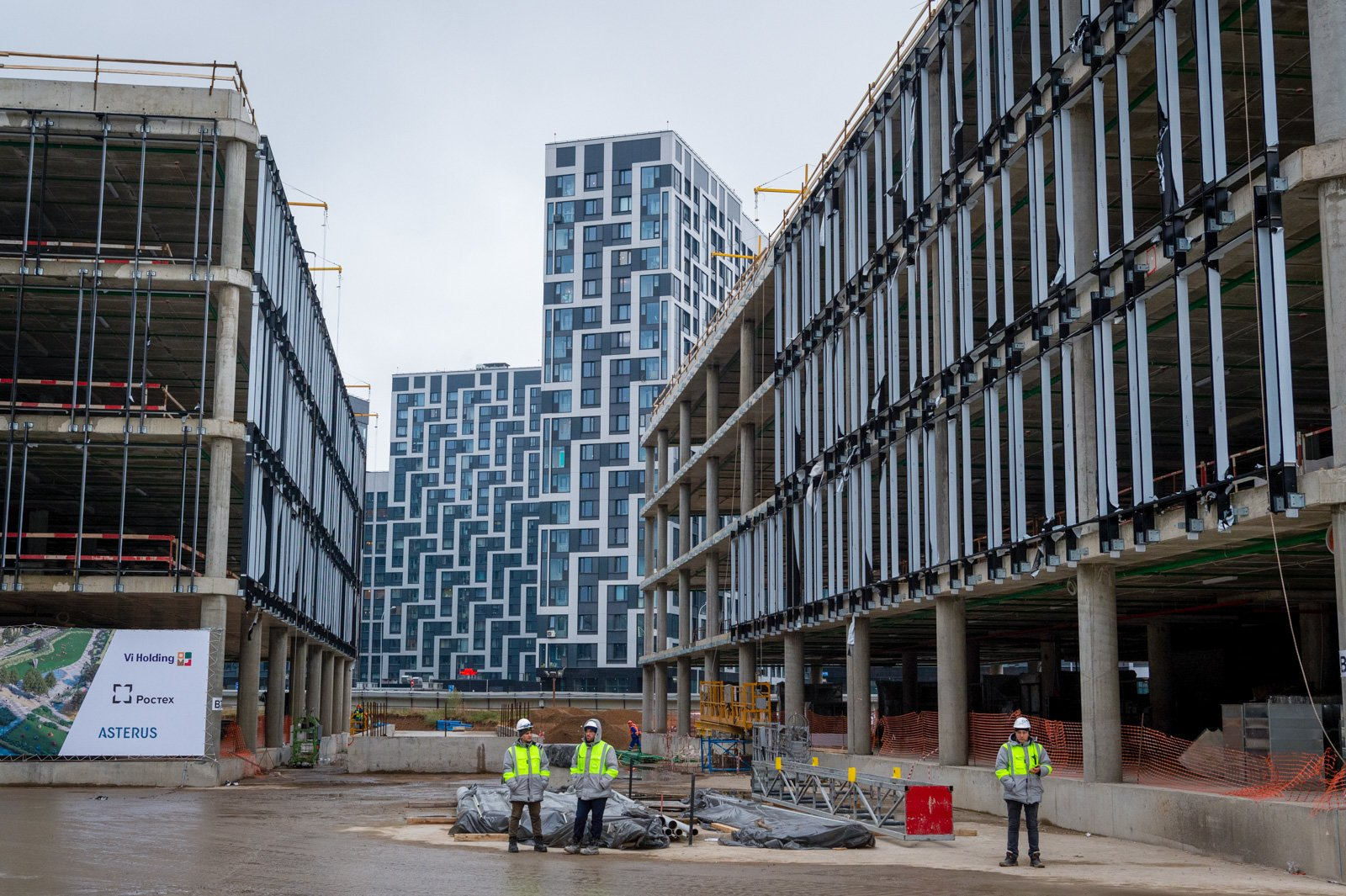
The construction of the new corporate headquarters complex of Rostec in Moscow.

As of late 2016, going by its development strategy, Rostec organizes its 700 enterprises into either directly controlled companies or clusters composed of holding companies.

=== Aerospace ===
- Russian Helicopters: unites all the military and civil helicopter designers and manufacturers of Russia
- Technodinamika: developer and manufacturer of aircraft equipment, including chassis, fuel systems, flight control systems and auxiliary power units
- United Aircraft Corporation: unites all the military and civil aviation designers and manufacturers of Russia
- United Engine Corporation: engines for military and civil aviation and space exploration programs

=== Armaments ===
- High Precision Systems: weapons for the combat tactical zone
- Kalashnikov Concern: Russia's largest manufacturer of combat weapons
- RT-Stankoprom: machine tool industry
- STAN: machine tool industry
- Security Technologies
- Techmash: ammunition supplies for the Armed Forces

=== Automotive ===
- RT-Auto: owns stakes in AvtoVAZ, Kamaz and Uralvagonzavod

=== Electronics ===
- Concern Avtomatika: the largest enterprise of the Russian Federation concerned with problems of information security, with development and production of secrecy communication equipment and systems, protected information and tele-communication systems and also special automated control systems
- Concern Radio-Electronic Technologies (KRET): military spec radio-electronic, state identification, aviation and radio-electronic equipment
- RosEl
  - Ruselectronics: electronic components, electronic devices and equipment, microwave equipment and semi-conductor devices
  - United Instrument Manufacturing Corporation: communications tools and systems, automated control systems, electronic security and robotic systems
- Shvabe Holding: optical-electronic systems both for military and civil purposes

=== Materials ===
- RT-Chemcomposite: specializes in innovative research and development in the field of polymer composite materials and integrated products for space exploration, aviation, arms and military equipment, ground and water transport, power utilities and other industries

=== Medical ===
- Nacimbio: pharmaceutical holding for research and development of immune biological remedies

=== Directly controlled companies ===
- Rosoboronexport: (arms export)
- AvtoVAZ: car manufacturer, (minority stake)
- Kamaz: leading Russian manufacturer of trucks
- Uralvagonzavod: Russian manufacturer of armored fighting vehicle
- RT-Invest diversified, (minority stake)
- RT-Business Development: charged with implementing the Rostec strategy aiming to increase capitalization of projects in the sectors of commercial advanced technologies, raw materials and associated infrastructure
- Russia TEC: (exhibition complex)
- National Ecological Operator: (waste management)

== Financial performance ==
The preliminary financial performance for 2012 show that the overall revenue of Rostec exceeded RUR960 billion compared with RUR817 billion a year earlier. Revenues from export to 70 countries globally exceeded RUR240 billion.

Main financial indicators, 2015 ($1 = 60,96 RUB):

- Consolidated revenue, $18.7 bln
- Consolidated net income, $1.62 bln
- Export revenues, $5.0 bln
- Total investments, $2.1 bln
- Exports of innovative products, $1.81 bln

The company's revenue in 2021 amounted to 2.06 trillion rubles (US$ 28 billion).

== See also ==
- State-owned Assets Supervision and Administration Commission
- List of companies of Russia
- Almaz-Antey
- Titan-Barrikady
