= Stanca =

Stanca may refer to:

- Stanca, a village in Stăncuța Commune, Romania
- Stanca Act, a 2004 Italian law promoting information technology accessibility
- Doamna Stanca, Princess of Wallachia
- Doamna Stanca National College (disambiguation), two education institutions in Romania

== Persons with the surname Stanca ==
- Ionela Stanca, Romanian handball player
- Lucio Stanca, Italian Minister of Innovations during the second cabinet of Berlusconi
- Radu Stanca, Romanian poet, playwright, theatre director, theatre critic and theoretician
- Răzvan Stanca, Romanian football player

== See also ==
- Stânca (disambiguation)
- Stanča (disambiguation)
