= Air Tomisko =

Cargo airline in Serbia

| IATA | ICAO | Call sign |
|---|---|---|
| - | TOH | TOMISKO CARGO |
- Founded: 2006
- Ceased operations: 2007
- Hubs: NA
- Fleet size: 1
- Destinations: NA
- Headquarters: Belgrade, Serbia
- Key people: Tomislav Damnjanović
- Website: NA

Air Tomisko was a cargo airline based in Belgrade, Serbia.

It was founded in 2006 and its owner was Tomislav Damnjanović who had previously worked at JAT Yugoslav Airlines and was director at Kosmas Air. The fleet consisted of 3 Ilyushin Il-76. The company lost its licence in 2007.
