= Ilyushin Il-76 =

Russian heavy four-engined military transport jet aircraft

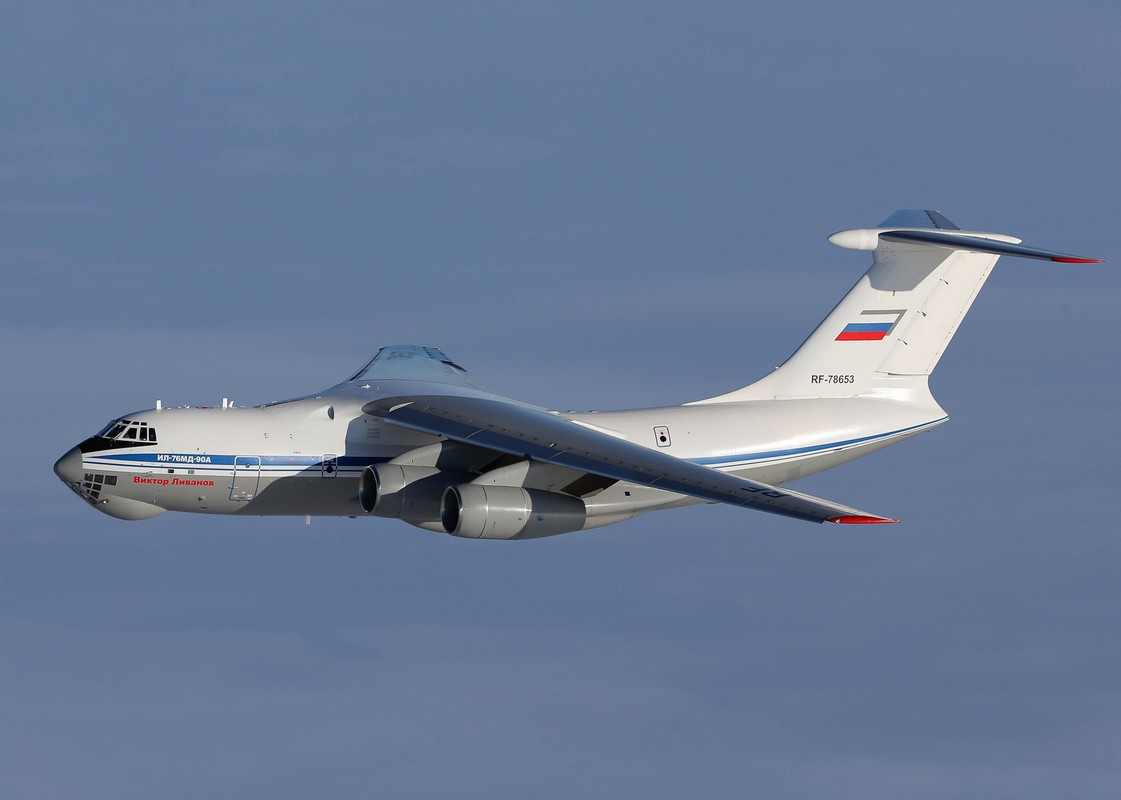
- A Russian Air Force Il-76MD-90A

General information
- Type: Strategic and tactical airlifter
- National origin: Soviet Union / Russia
- Designer: Ilyushin
- Built by: Tashkent Aviation Production Association (formerly); Aviastar-SP
- Status: In service, in production
- Primary users: Soviet Air Forces (historical) Russian Aerospace Forces; People's Liberation Army Air Force; Indian Air Force
- Number built: 981

History
- Manufactured: 1971–present
- Introduction date: June 1974; 52 years ago
- First flight: 25 March 1971; 55 years ago
- Variants: Ilyushin Il-78; Beriev A-50; Beriev A-60; Beriev A-100; Shaanxi KJ-2000

The Ilyushin Il-76 (Russian: Илью́шин Ил-76; NATO reporting name: Candid) is a multi-purpose, fixed-wing, four-engine turbofan strategic airlifter designed by the Soviet Union's Ilyushin design bureau as a commercial freighter in 1967, to replace the Antonov An-12. It was developed to deliver heavy machinery to remote and poorly served areas. Military versions of the Il-76 have been widely used in Europe, Asia and Africa, including use as an aerial refueling tanker and command center.

The Il-76 has seen extensive service as a commercial freighter for ramp-delivered cargo, especially for outsized or heavy items that cannot be carried by other means. It has also been used as an emergency response transport for civilian evacuations as well as for humanitarian aid and disaster relief around the world. Due to its ability to operate from unpaved runways, it has been useful in undeveloped areas. Specialized models have also been produced for aerial firefighting and reduced-gravity training.

== Design and development ==
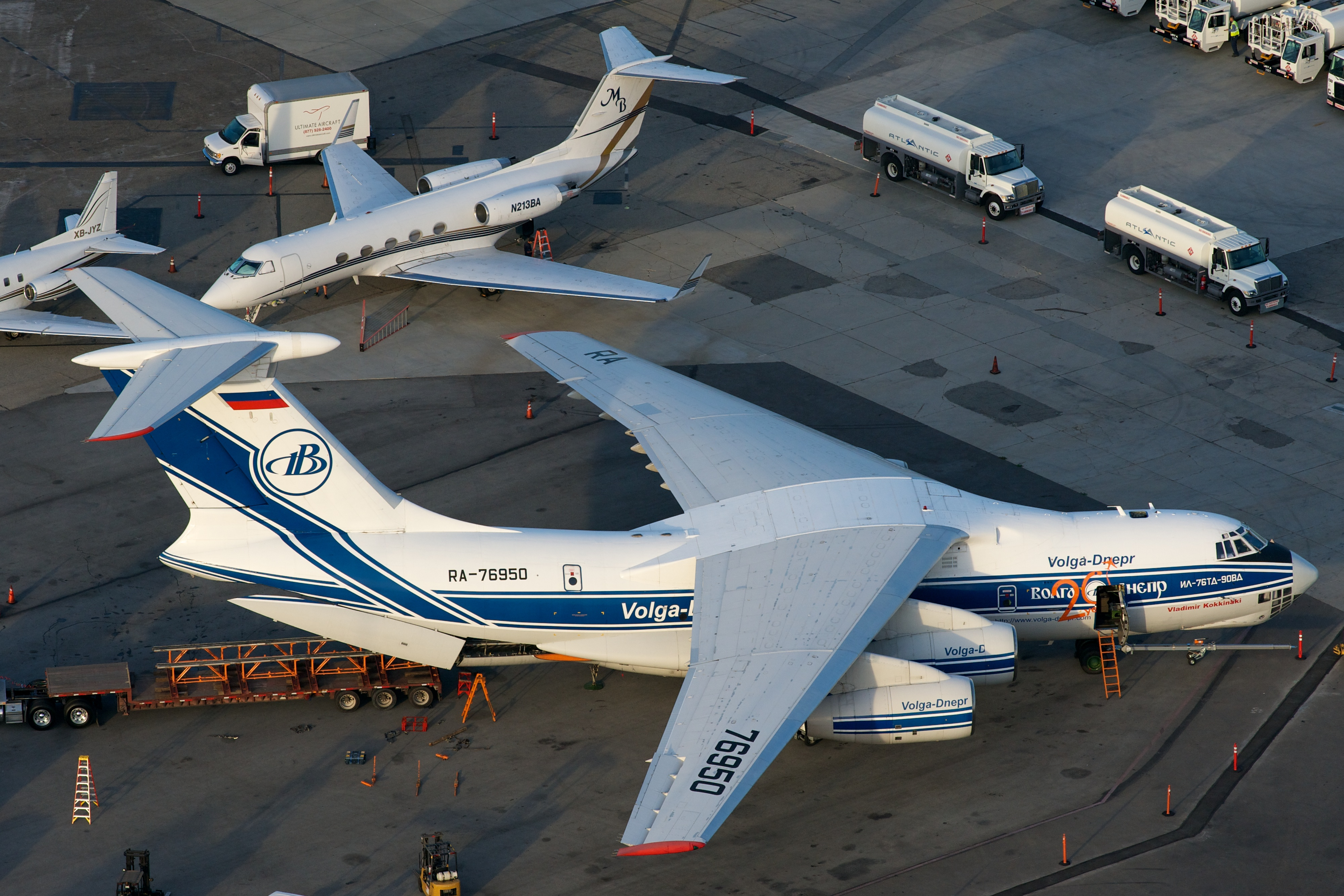
The Il-76 is a high-wing freighter with four turbofans and a T-tail

=== Origins ===
The aircraft was conceived by Ilyushin in 1967 to meet a requirement for a freighter able to carry a payload of 40 tonnes (88,000 lb) over a range of 5,000 kilometres (2,700 nmi; 3,100 mi) in less than six hours, able to operate from short (500 metres or less for a commercial airliner) and unprepared airstrips, and capable of coping with the harsh weather conditions likely to be experienced in Siberia and the Soviet Union's Arctic regions. It was intended to replace the Antonov An-12. Another project design for a double-decked 250-passenger airliner was canceled. The Il-76 first flew in March 1971.

Production of Il-76s was allocated to the Tashkent Aviation Production Association in Tashkent, Uzbekistan, then a republic of the Soviet Union. Some 860 of the basic transport variants were manufactured. In the 1990s, modernized variants also equipped with Soloviev D-30 turbofan engines were developed (MF, TF), with a cargo compartment 20 m (66 ft) long by 3.4 m (11 ft) wide by 3.4 m (11 ft) tall; these larger variants were not produced in significant quantity due to the financial difficulties being experienced by the Russian Air Force, which was the primary operator of the type.

=== Further development ===
From 2004 onwards, a number of aircraft in commercial service were modernized to the Il-76TD-90VD version; this involved the adoption of the newly developed PS-90 engine to comply with European noise limitations. In 2005, the People's Republic of China placed an order for 34 new Il-76MDs and four Il-78 tankers. In June 2013, Russian military export agency Rosoboronexport announced an order by China for 12 Il-76MD aircraft.

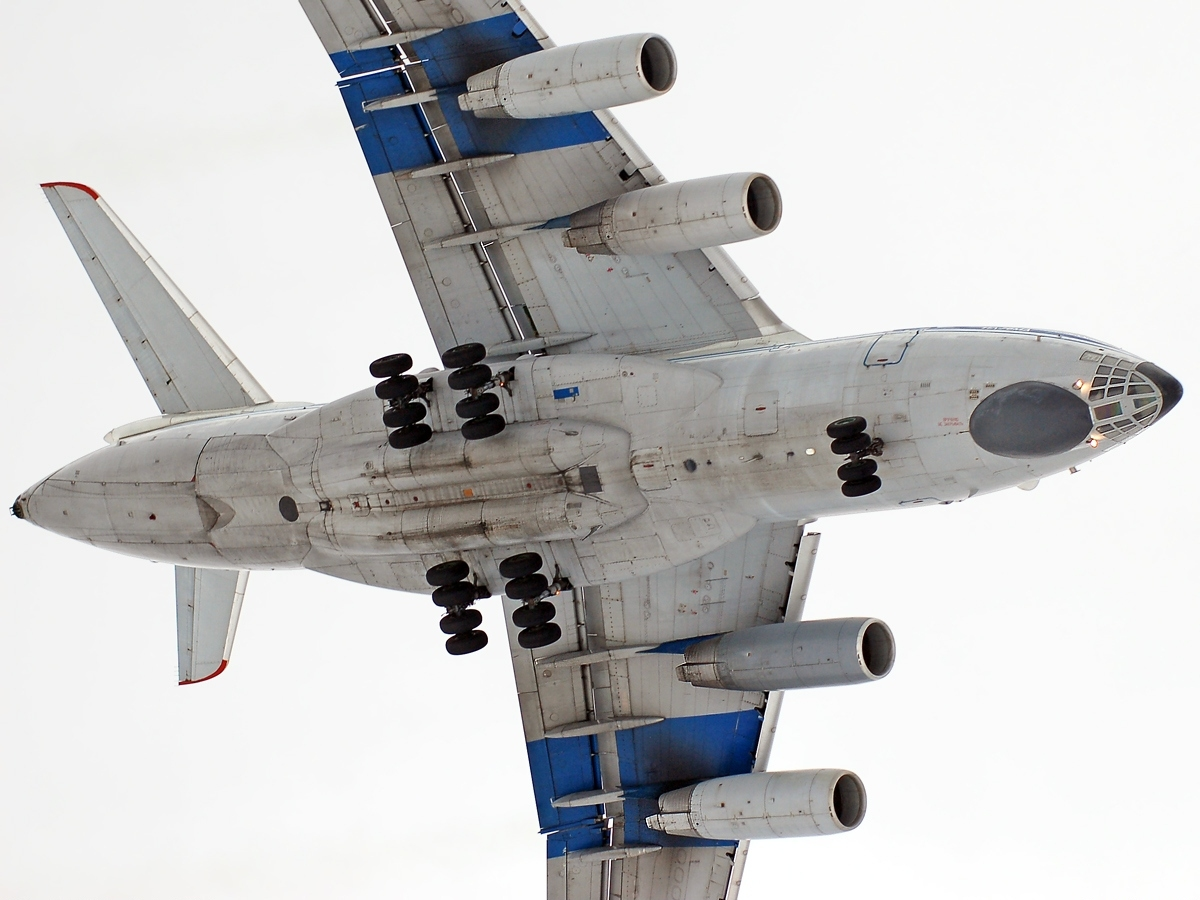
Landing gear of an Ilyushin Il-76

The Il-76 has also been modified into an airborne refueling tanker, designated the Il-78, around 50 aircraft having been produced. A variant of the Il-76 also serves as a firefighting waterbomber. Its airframe was used as a base for the Beriev A-50 'Mainstay' AEW&C (airborne early warning and control) aircraft; around 25 aircraft were made. Another application for the type was found in Antarctic support flights and for conducting simulated weightlessness training for cosmonauts (akin to the "Vomit Comet" used by NASA). Beriev and NPO Almaz also developed an airborne laser flying laboratory designated A-60, of which two were built, much of this project's details remaining classified.

=== Il-76MD-90A ===
It was announced in 2010 that the production of a modernized Il-76, the Il-76MD-90A (also known as project Il-476 during the design stage), would begin; a proposed new production line would be located in Aviastar's facility in Ulyanovsk, Russia, and be operated in cooperation with the Tashkent works. At that point, the construction of two Il-76MD-90A prototypes had begun at the Ulyanovsk facility. The first Il-76MD-90A was rolled out at Aviastar's Ulyanovsk plant on 16 June 2014. On 29 April 2015, it was reported that the Russian Aerospace Forces received the first Il-76MD-90A built at the Ulyanovsk plant "Aviastar-SP" from the 2012 contract for 39 aircraft. The Russian Ministry of Defence (MoD) received its first serial production Ilyushin Il-76MD-90A airlifter on 2 April 2019. As of late 2025, 27 aircraft are ordered to be delivered in the period up to 2028 and 27+ had been built, six in 2023, six in 2024, and seven in 2025. In 2025, the production rate of the Il-76 reached 7 aircraft per year. There are plans to expand production at the plant in Ulyanovsk and in 2027 it is expected to assemble 12 aircraft, and later - up to 18 per year.

== Operational history ==
The first aircraft was delivered to the Soviet Air Force in June 1974 and subsequently became the main Soviet strategic transport aircraft. From 1976, it was operated by Aeroflot.

Video of Il-76MD landing on an unpaved runway

Between 1979 and 1991, Soviet Air Force Il-76s made 14,700 flights into Afghanistan, transporting 786,200 servicemen and 315,800 tons of freight. The Il-76 carried 89% of Soviet troops and 74% of the freight that was airlifted. As Afghan rebels were unable to shoot down high-flying Il-76s, their tactics were to try and damage it on takeoff or landing. Il-76s were often hit by shoulder-launched Stinger and Strela heat-seeking missiles and large-calibre machine gun fire, but because the strong airframes were able to take substantial damage and remain operational, the aircraft had a remarkably low attrition rate during this period of conflict. Building on that earlier experience, during 2006 the bulk of the Canadian Forces equipment airlifted into Afghanistan was flown in using rented civilian Il-76s. In 2006, the Russian Air Force had about 200 Il-76s. Civilian users in Russia have 108.

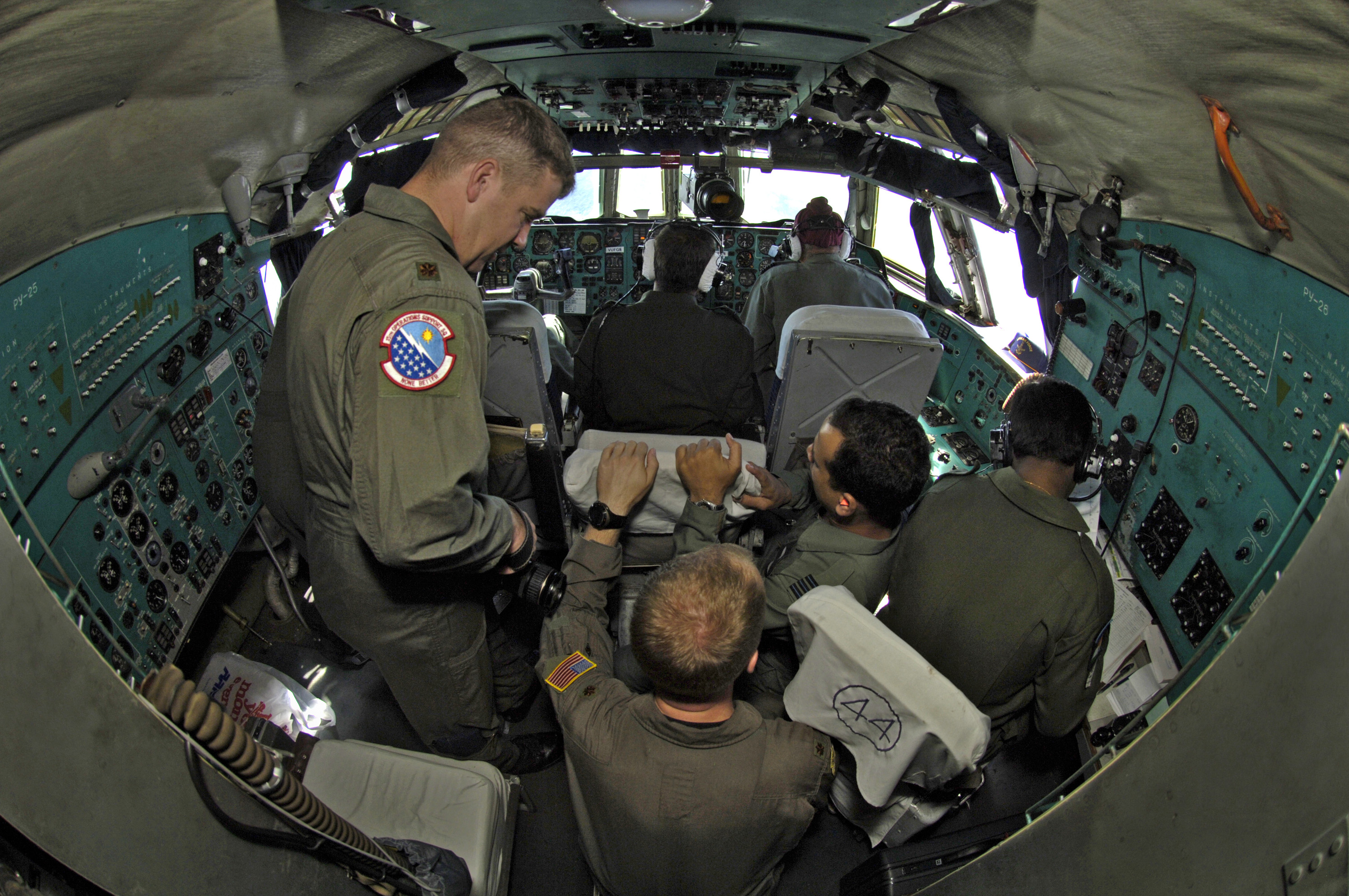
USAF and IAF airmen work inside the cockpit of an Indian Il-76

In 2004, a Chinese People's Liberation Army Air Force (PLAAF) Il-76 carried out a flight mission in Afghanistan, and later in 2011, PLAAF Il-76s were sent to Libya to evacuate Chinese citizens. The two missions were the reported first steps of PLAAF developing long-range transportation capability.

Syrian Air Force Il-76s, operating as civil Syrianair aircraft, have been reportedly used to ship weapons, money, and other cargo from Russia and Iran to Syria, according to a defected Syrian military pilot. Since the start of the war, in April 2011 (and up to July 2012), around 20 military flights have been conducted to and from Tehran, via Iraqi airspace. Further information exposes that since around 2012, Syrian Il-76s have regularly flown to Moscow's Vnukovo Airport to fetch shipments of Syrian banknotes that have been useful to Bashar al-Assad's government to survive international sanctions.

On 30 January 2017, an Il-76 firebomber of the Russian EMERCOM agency was deployed to Chile to assist firefighters. The assignment took 39 days.

All Il-76 transport aircraft in service with the RF Aerospace Forces were to receive anti-missile systems, and aircraft reconfiguration started in spring 2019.

== Variants ==
=== Prototypes and developmental variants ===
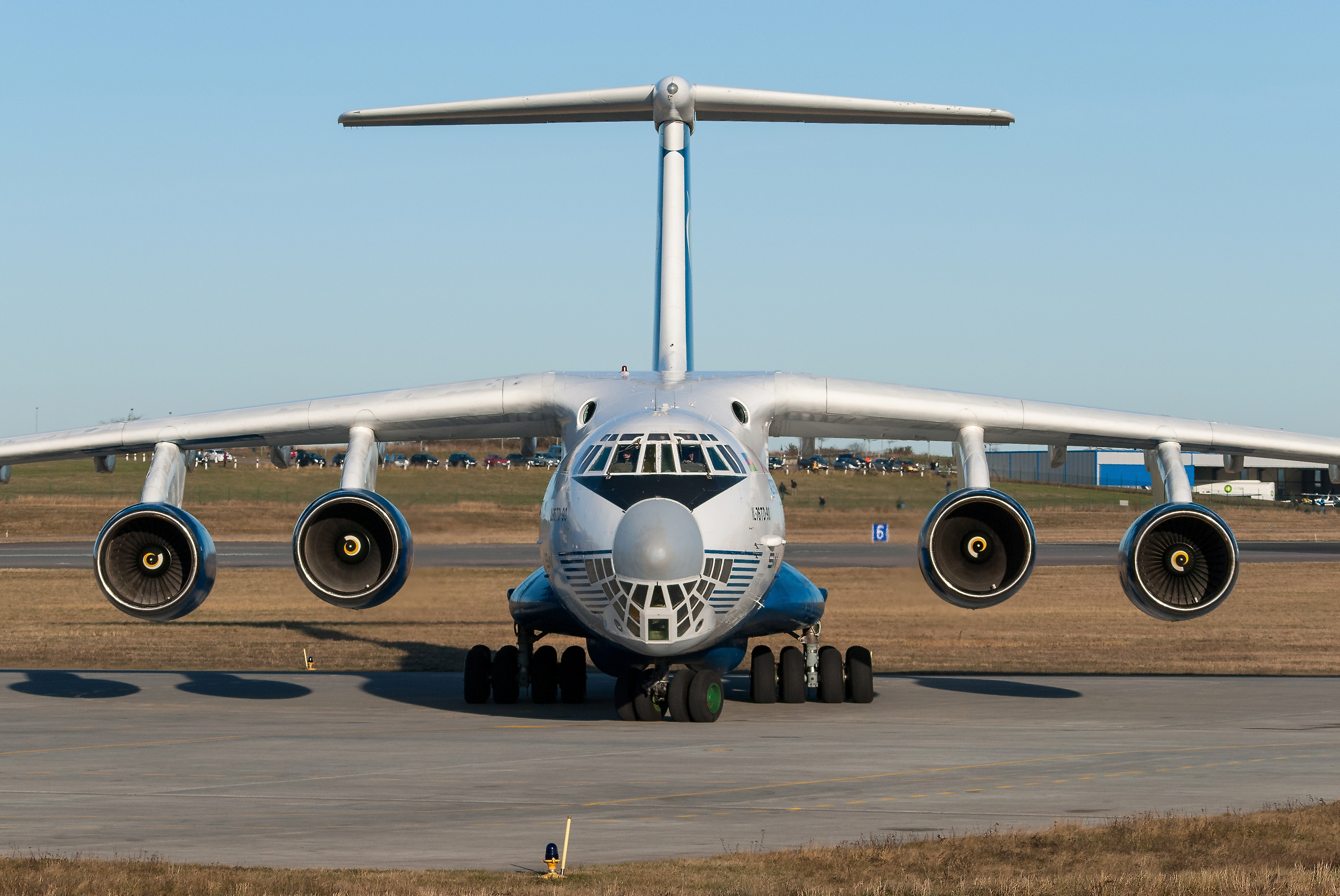
Il-76TD-90, Aviadvigatel PS-90 engines have larger diameter.

Il-76TD-90/Il-76MD-90
Engine upgrades to Perm PS-90s.
Il-76 firebomber
Firefighting aircraft to drop exploding capsules filled with fire retardant.
Il-76PSD
SAR version of Il-76MF
Il-96
Early development of convertible passenger/cargo aircraft, (project only, designation re-used later)
Il-150
Proposed Beriev A-50 with Perm PS-90 engines.
Beriev A-60
Airborne laser weapon testbed (Il-76 version 1A)

==== Special purpose/research variants ====
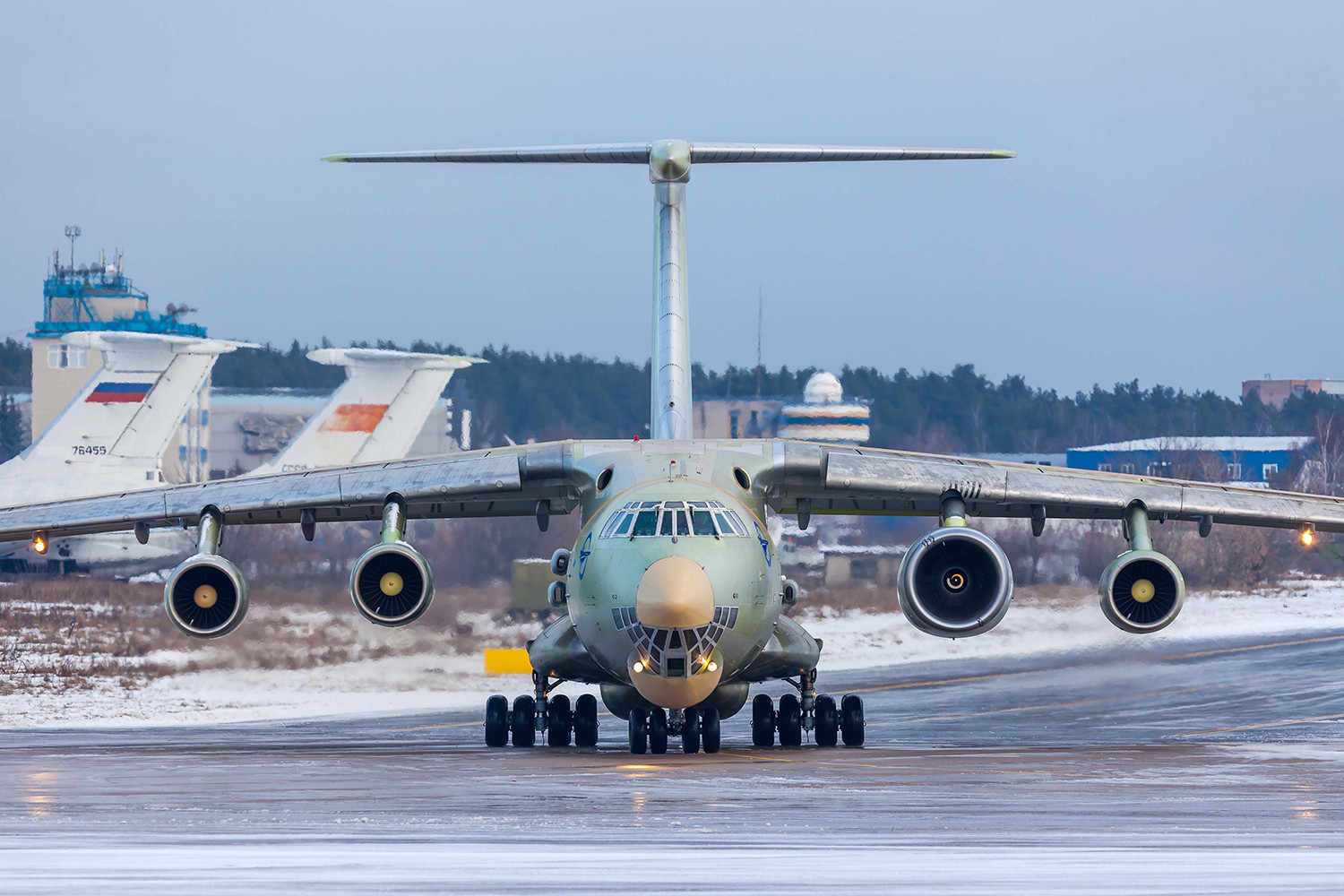
Il-76LL with PD-14 engine prototype under testing, 2015

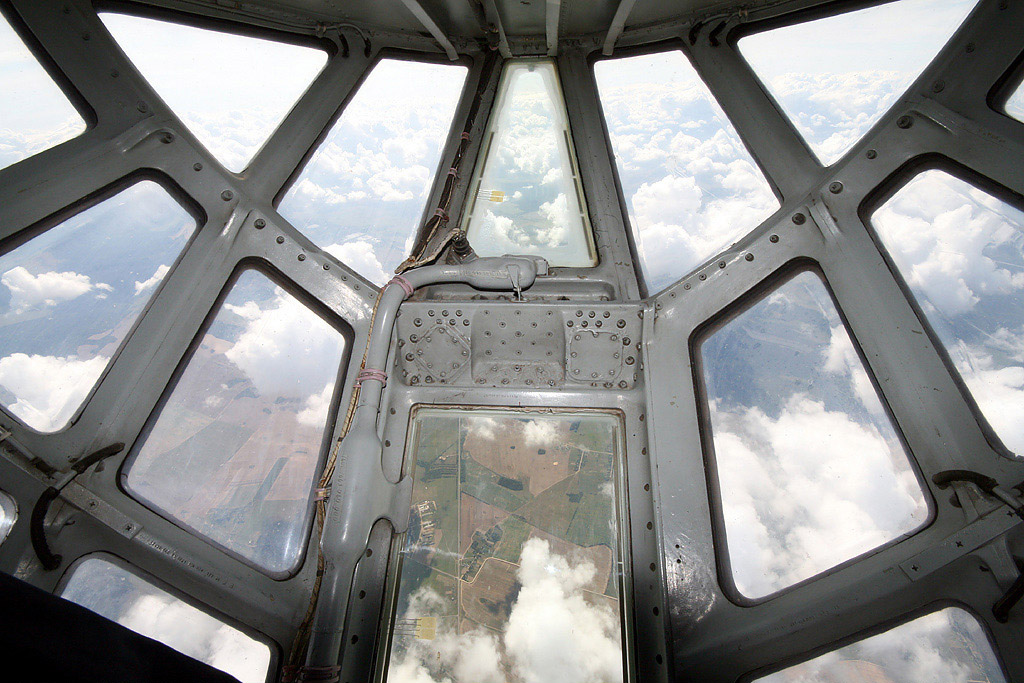
Il-76TD glass nose which serves as the flight navigator's station.

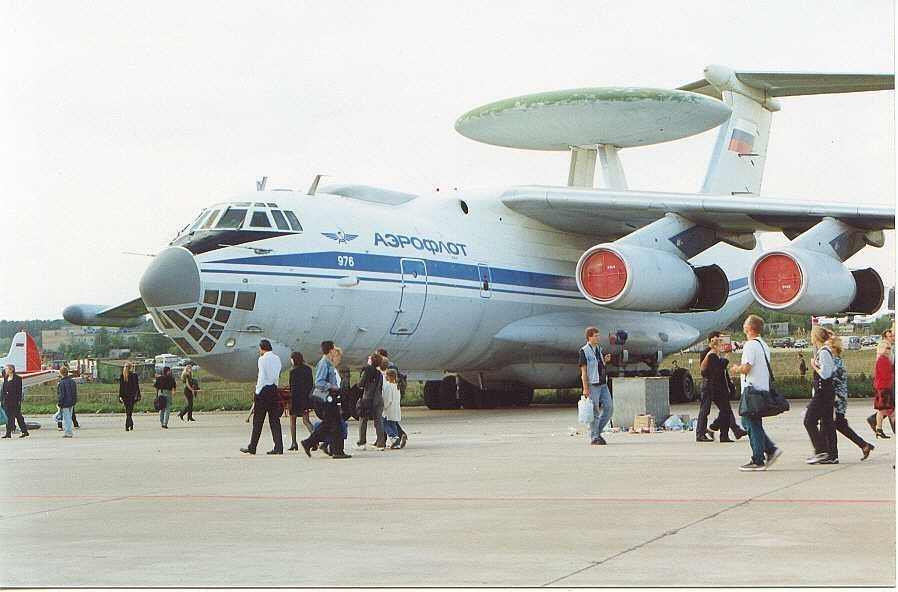
Il-76LL SKIP testbed, 1999 flying with Aeroflot markings

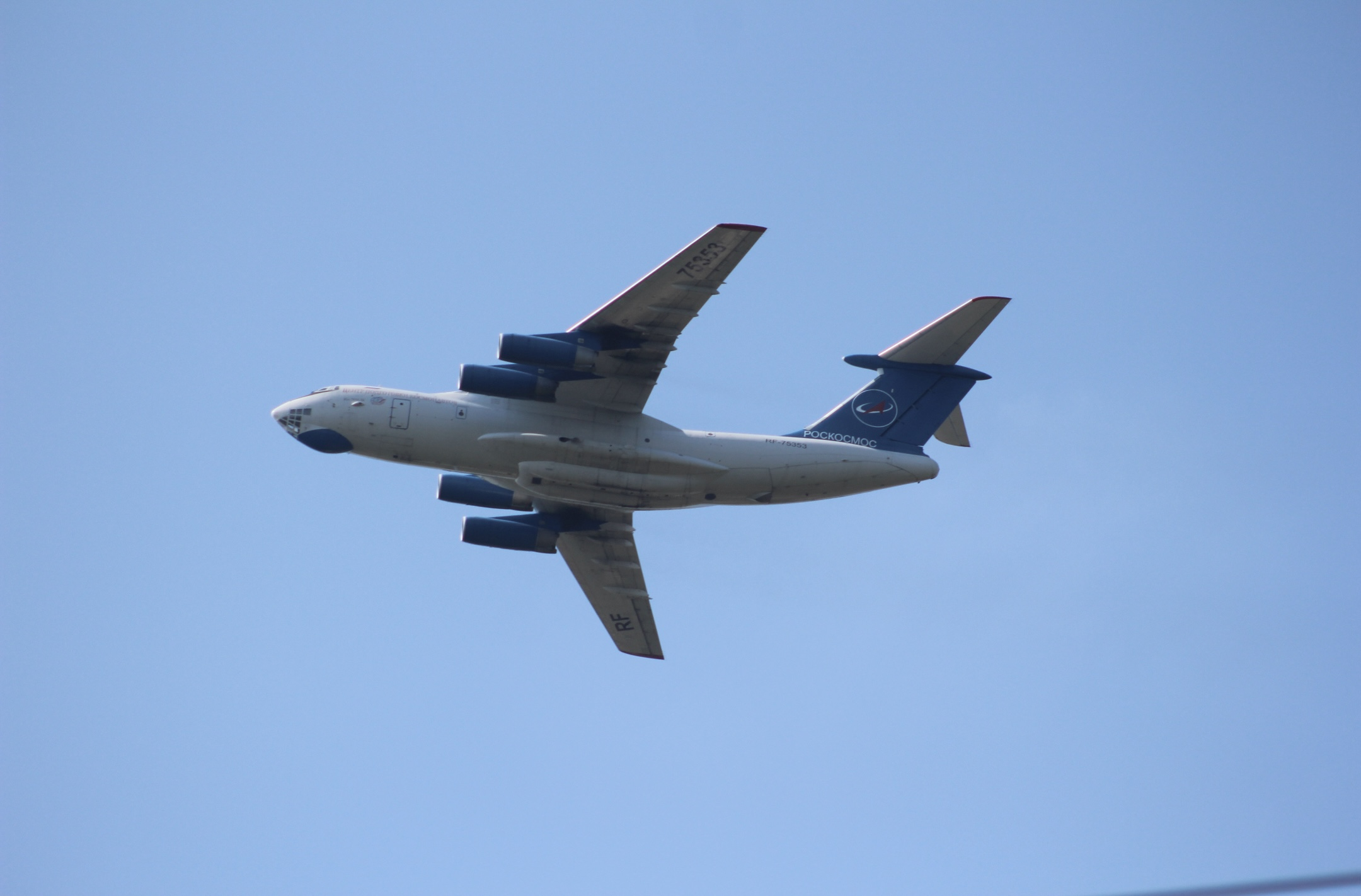
GCTC Il-76MDK in 2025

IAF IL-76 unloading an APC in Ladakh

Il-76LL
With reinforced wing (at least 3 aircraft) to be used as test-bed airplane for engine prototypes flight testing in Gromov Flight Research Institute.
Izdeliye-176
Prototype Il-76PP.
Izdeliye-576
Izdeliye-676
Telemetry and communications relay aircraft, for use during trial programmes (prototype).
Izdeliye-776
Telemetry and communications relay aircraft, for use during trial programmes (prototype).
Izdeliye-976 ("SKIP", Il-976, or Il-76SK) – (СКИП – Самолетный Контрольно-Измерительный Пункт, Airborne Check-Measure-and-Control Center)
Il-76/A-50 based range control and missile tracking platform. Initially built to support Raduga Kh-55 cruise missile tests.
Izdeliye-1076
Special mission aircraft for unknown duties.
Izdeliye-1176
ELINT electronic intelligence aircraft, or Il-76-11
Il-76-Tu160 tailplane transporter
One-off temporary conversion to support Tu-160 emergency modification programme.
Il-76K/Il-76MDK/Il-76MDK-II
Reduced-gravity aircraft for cosmonaut training used by Yuri Gagarin Cosmonaut Training Center.
Il-76LL
Engine testbed (ooniversahl'naya letayuschchaya laboratoriya).
Il-76PP
ECM aircraft, major problems with ECM equipment on the Izdeliye-176 only.
Il-84
Maritime search and rescue aircraft (alternative designation – Il-76PS – poiskovo-spasahtel'nyy), not produced.

=== Military variants ===
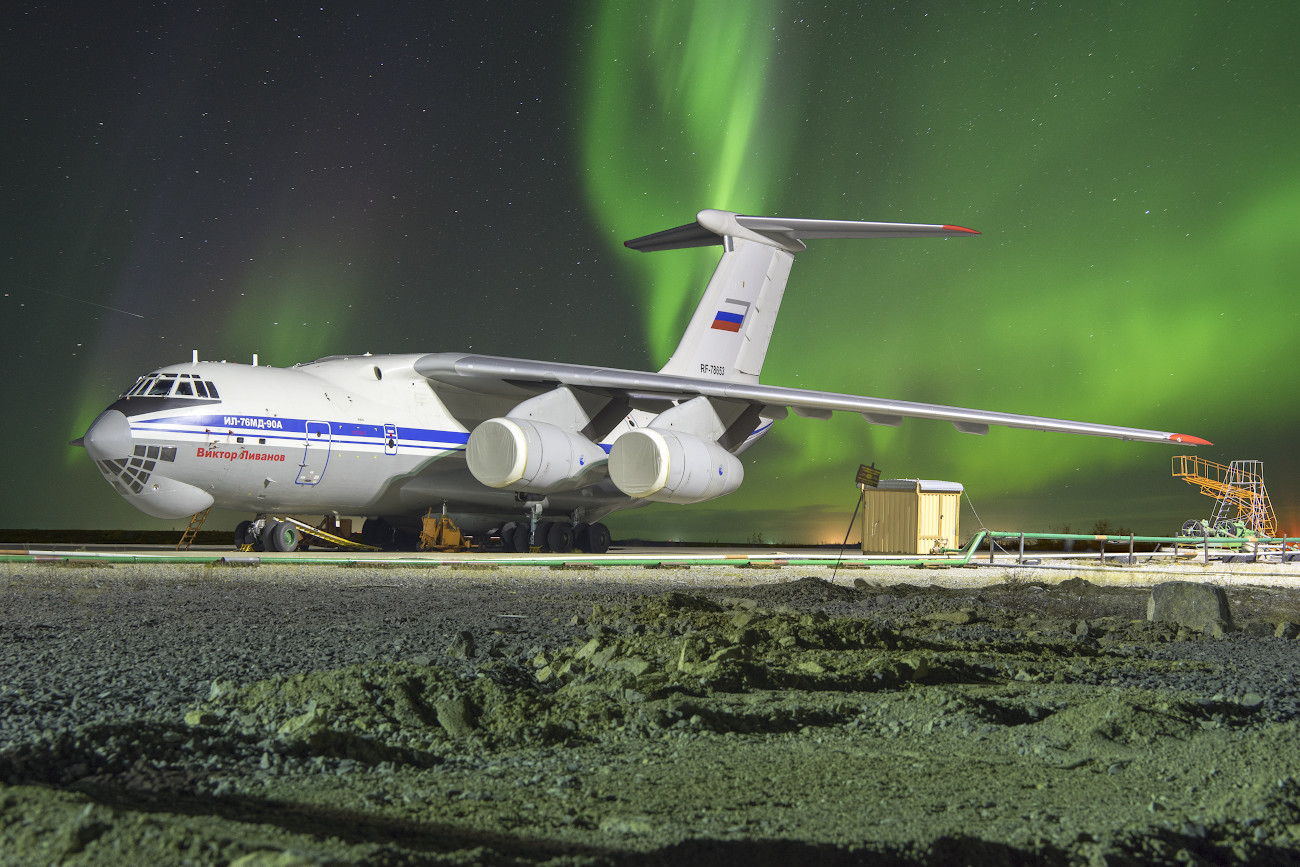
Il-76MD-90A of the Russian Aerospace Forces

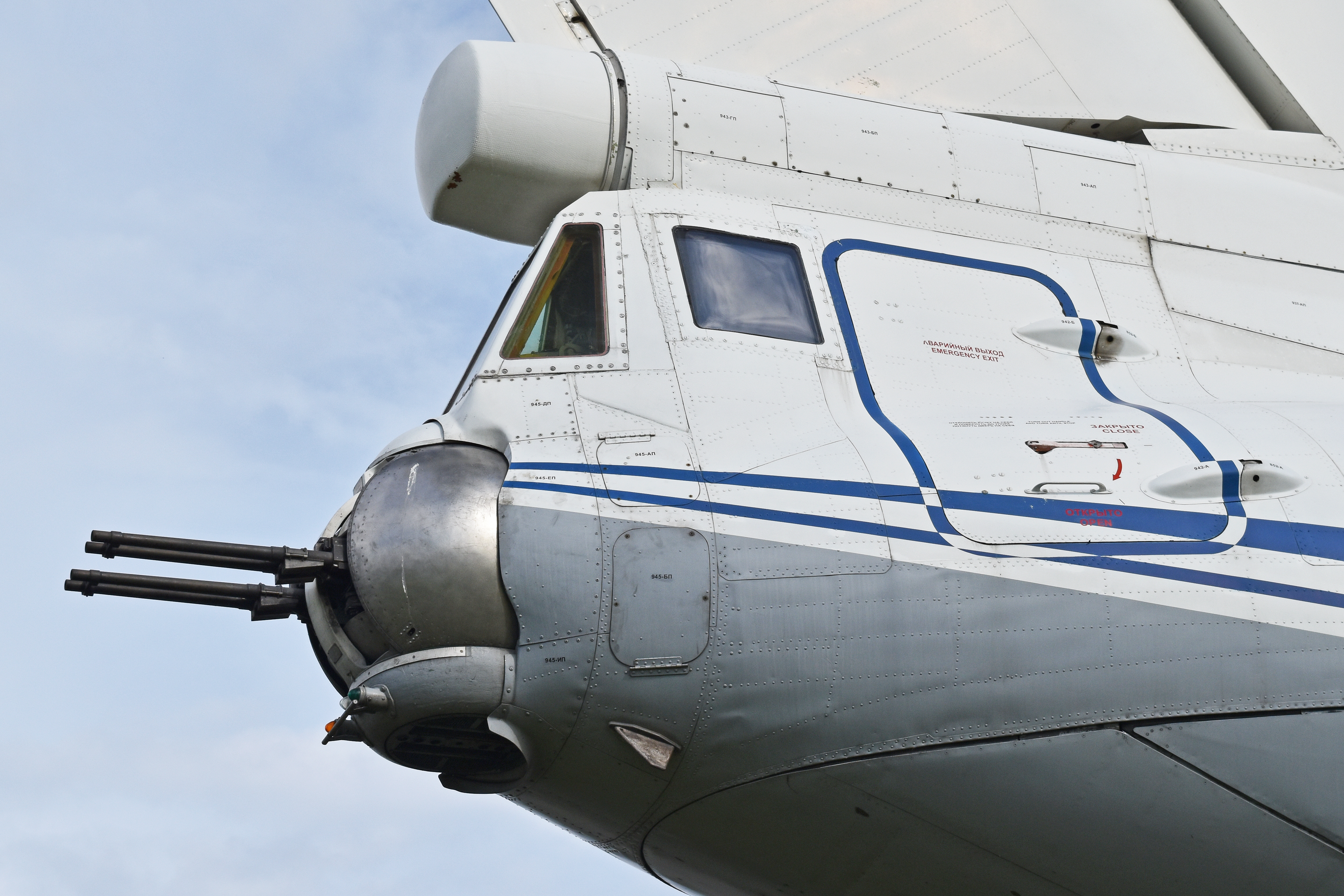
Il-76MD GSh-23 tail guns

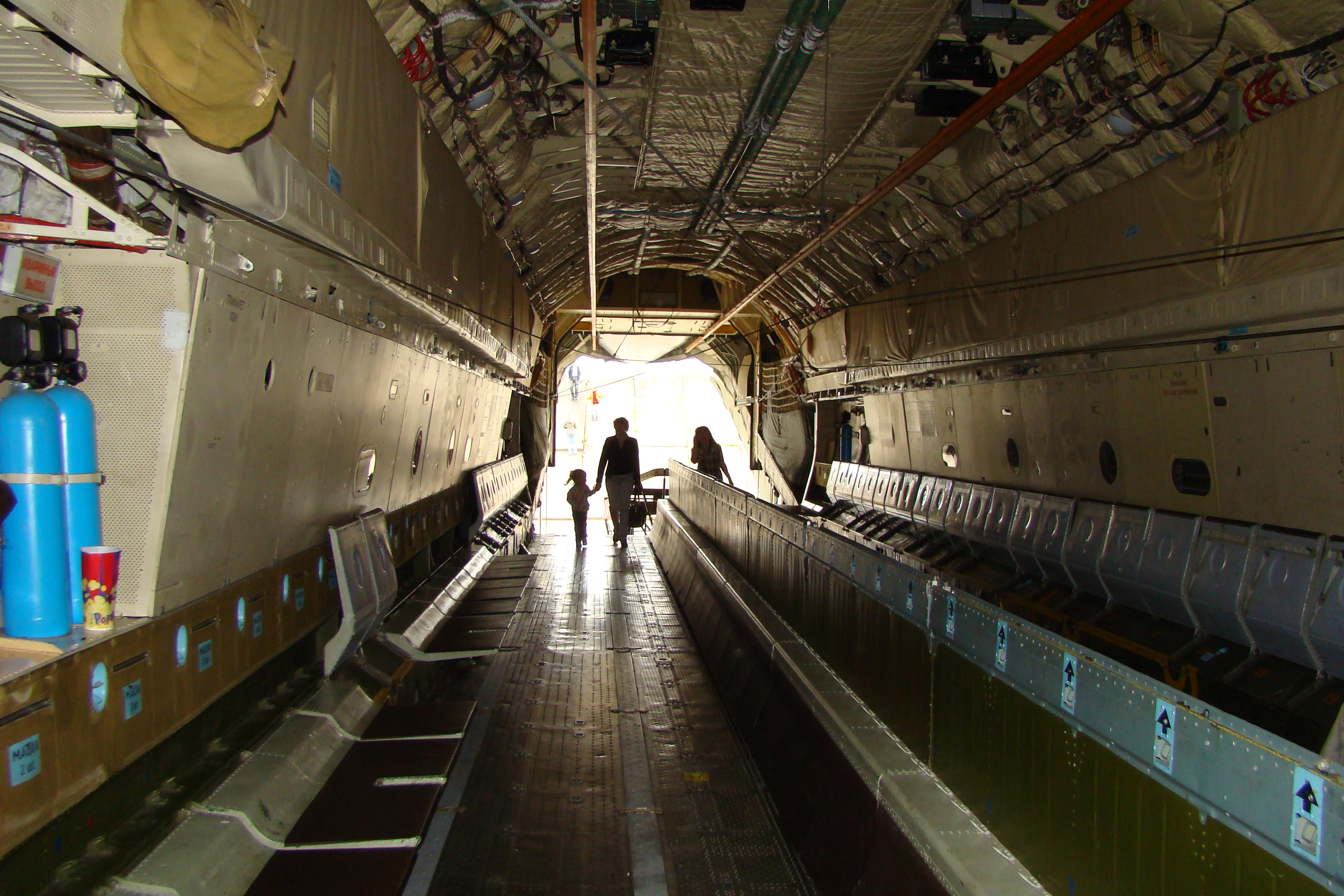
Il-76MD cargo cabin

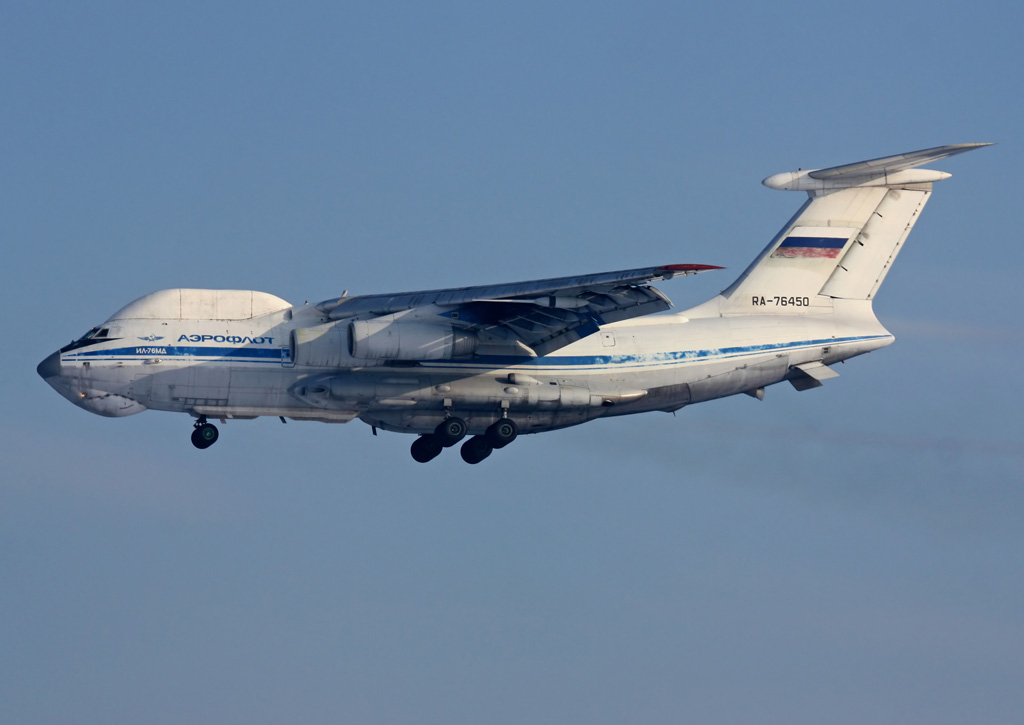
An Il-76VKP/-82 flying under the Aeroflot brand name

Il-76D
('D' for "Desantnyi", Десантный – "paratrooper transport") has a gun turret in the tail for defensive purposes.
Il-76M
Military transport version, (modifitseerovannyy – modified).
Il-76MD
Improved military transport version, (modifitseerovannyy Dahl'ny – modified, long-range).
Il-76MD Skal'pel-MT
Mobile Hospital
Il-76M/Il-76MD
Built without military equipment but designated as Ms and MDs (Gordon – 'Falsies')
Il-76MD-90
An Il-76MD with quieter and more economical Aviadvigatel PS-90 high-bypass turbofan engines.
Il-76MF
Stretched military version with a 6.6 m (22 ft) longer fuselage, PS-90A-76 engines, maximum takeoff weight of 210 t (460,000 lb) and a lift capability of 60 t (130,000 lb). First flew in 1995. Two built and delivered to the Royal Jordanian Air Force, later sold to the Egyptian Air Force.
Il-76MD-M
Modernized Il-76MD for the Russian Aerospace Forces.
Il-76MD-90A
An upgraded version with a new glass cockpit, upgraded avionics, new one-piece carbon-fibre wing, and Aviadvigatel PS-90A-76 engines. It was also known as Il-476 while in development. Designated as Il-76-MD-90AE for the export market.
Il-76T/Il-76TD
Built as military aircraft but given civilian designations. (Gordon – 'Falsie')
Ilyushin Il-78/Il-78M/Il-78M(K)-90A
Aerial refueling tanker.
Il-78 MKI
A customized version of the Il-78 developed for the Indian Air Force.
Il-82
Airborne Command Post/communications relay aircraft, (alternative designation – Il-76VKP – 'version65S').
Beriev A-50/Beriev A-50M/Beriev A-50I/Beriev A-50E
Airborne Early Warning & Control aircraft. Beriev given control over the program.
Beriev A-100
An AEW&C version of the Il-76MD-90A. Currently in development, with at least two prototypes built.

=== Civil variants ===
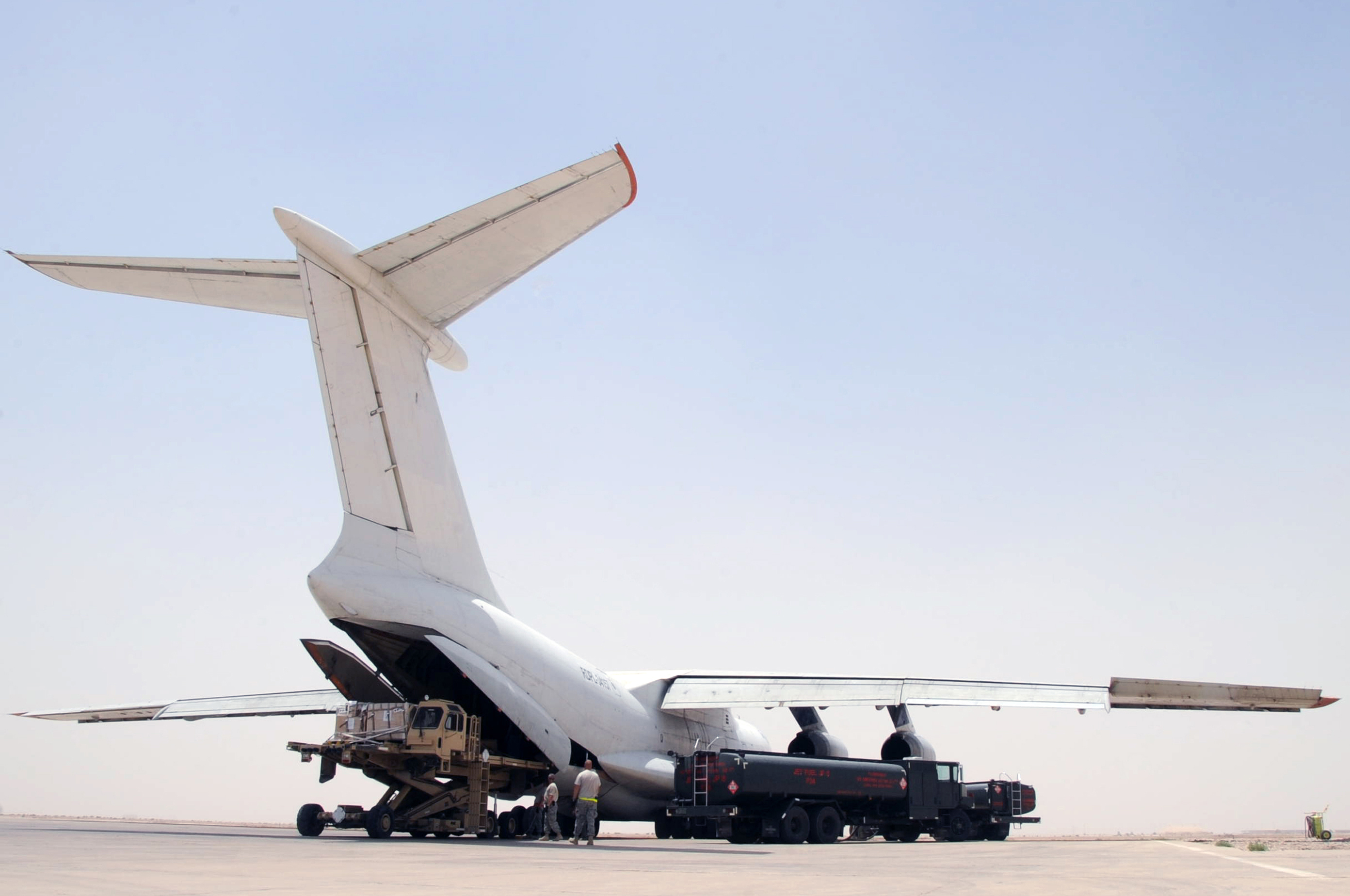
A commercial variant of the Ilyushin Il-76, loading cargo at Ali Air Base, Iraq

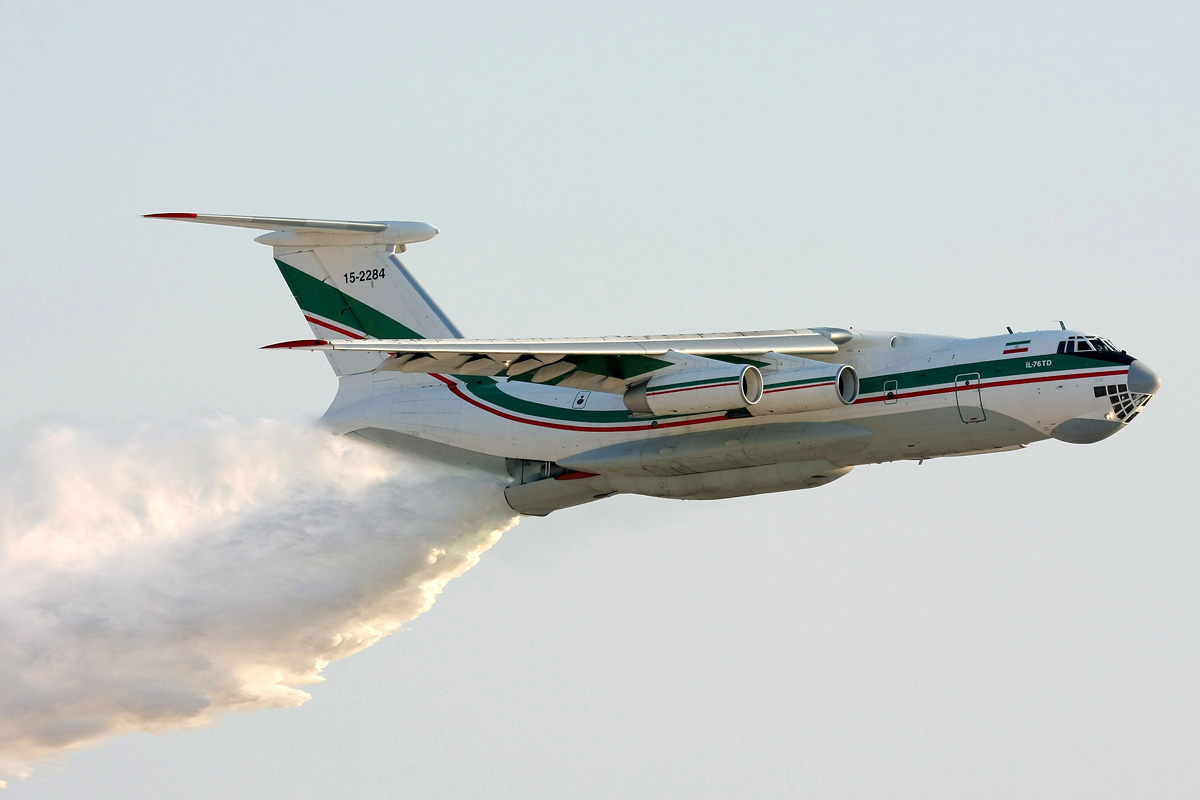
An Il-76TD belonging to the IRGC, used as a firefighting aircraft

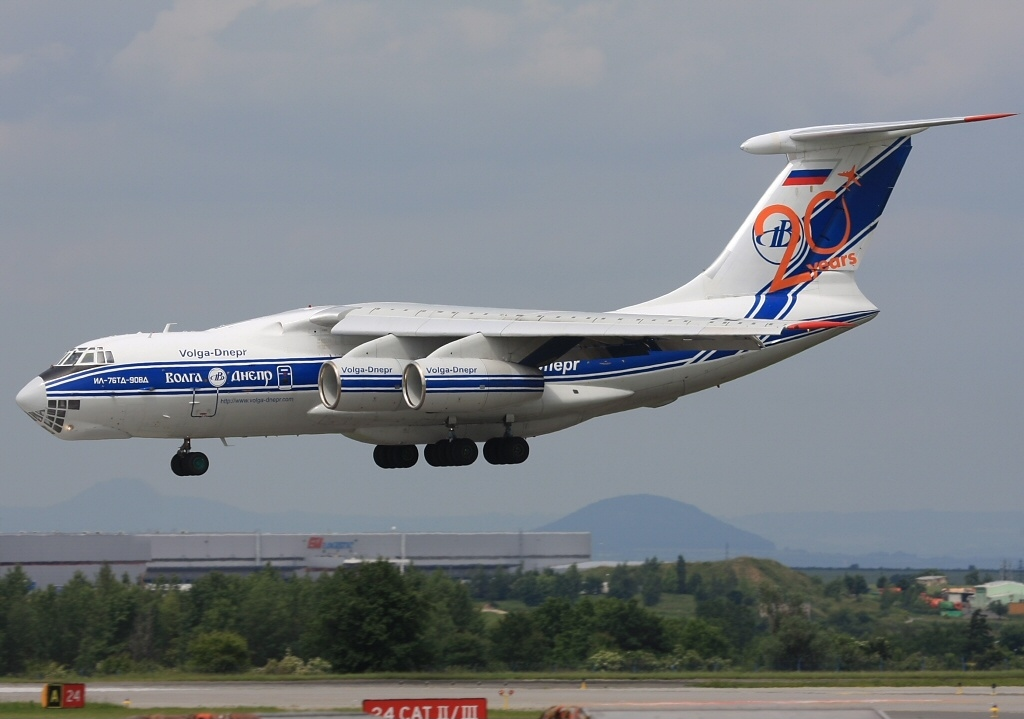
A Volga-Dnepr Airlines Il-76TD-90VD flying commercial operations

Il-76MGA
Initial commercial freighter (two prototypes and 12 production) equipped with Soloviev D-30 turbofan engines.
Il-76MD to Il-76TD conversions
Complete removal of military equipment, identified by crude cover over OBIGGS inlet in Starboard Sponson.
Il-76P/Il-76TP/Il-76TDP/Il-76MDP
firefighting aircraft. The Il-76 waterbomber is a VAP-2 1.5-hour install/removal tanking kit conversion. The Il-76 can carry up to 49,000 litres (13,000 US gal) of water; 3.5 times the capacity of the C-130 Hercules. Since this kit can be installed on any Il-76, the designation Il-76TP, Il-76TDP are also used when those versions of the Il-76 are converted into waterbombers. The Il-76P was first unveiled in 1990.
Il-76T
('T' for Transport, Транспортный) unarmed civil cargo transport version. NATO code-name "Candid-A". It first flew on November 4, 1978.
Il-76TD
The civil equivalent of the Il-76MD, first flew in 1982, equipped with Soloviev D-30 turbofan engines.
Il-76TD-90
An Il-76TD with Aviadvigatel PS-90 engines and a partial glass cockpit.
Il-76TD-90VD
An Il-76TD with Aviadvigatel PS-90 engines and a partial glass cockpit. It was developed specially for Volga-Dnepr cargo company, which operates five aircraft as of 2021.
Il-76TD-S
Civilian mobile hospital, similar to Il-76MD Skal'pel-MT.
Il-76TF
Civil transport stretched version with Aviadvigatel PS-90 engines. It is the civil version of the Il-76MF (none produced).

=== Foreign variants ===
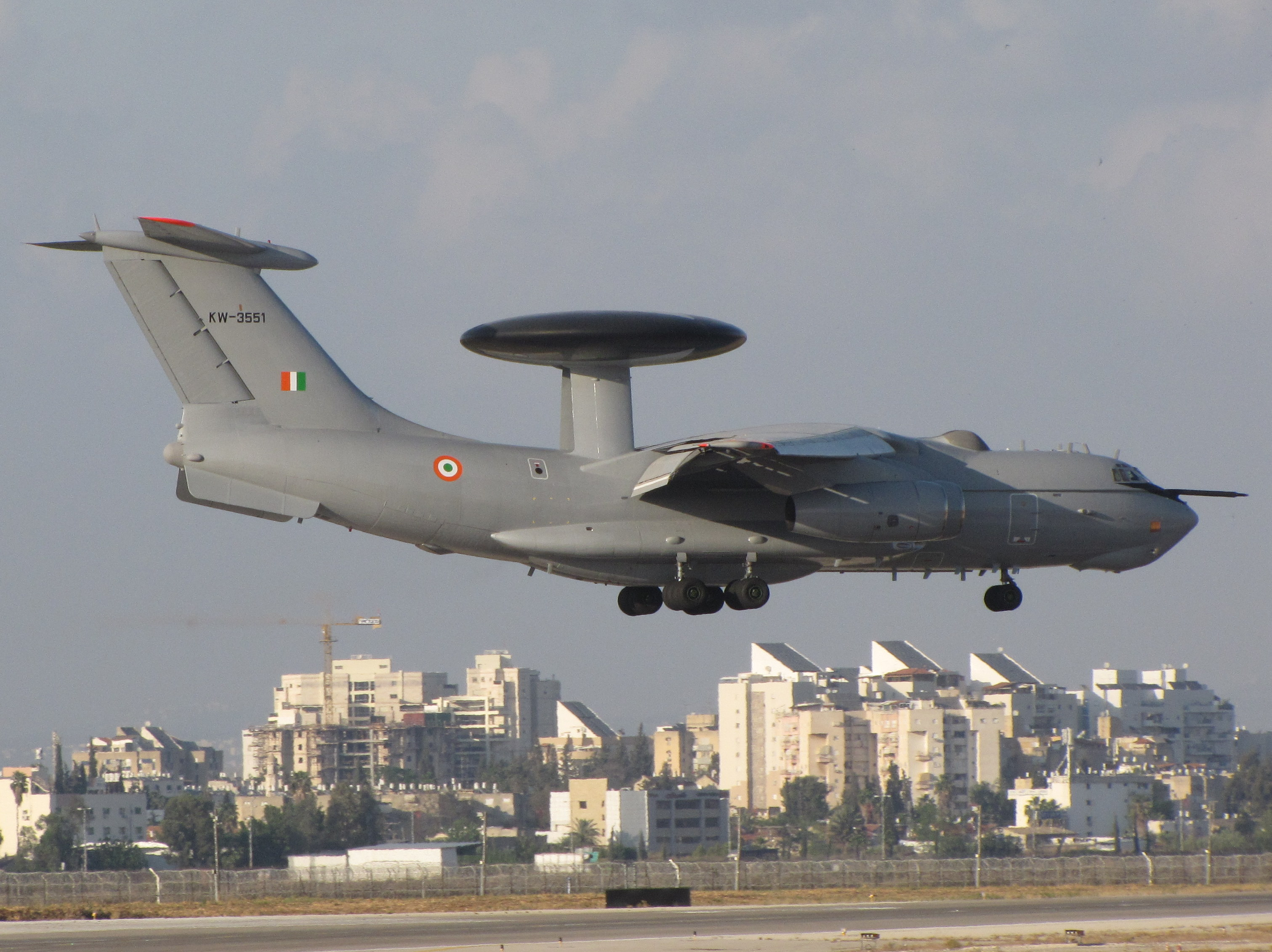
A-50E/I Mainstay of the Indian Air Force

Beriev A-50E/I
For the Indian Air Force. Hosts Israeli Phalcon radar for AEW&C and Aviadvigatel PS-90 engines.
Il-76MD tanker
Iraqi Air Force tanker conversions.
Shaanxi KJ-2000
Domestic Chinese airborne early warning and control conversion of Il-76, developed after A-50I was canceled and currently in service with the armed forces of China.
CFTE engine testbed
The China Flight Test Establishment (CFTE) currently operates a flying testbed converted from a Russian-made Il-76MD jet transport aircraft to serve as a flying testbed for future engine development programmes. The first engine to be tested on the aircraft is the WS-10A "Taihang" turbofan, currently being developed as the powerplant for China's indigenous J-10 and J-11 fighter aircraft. Il-76MD #76456, acquired by the AVIC 1 from Russia in the 1990s, is currently based at CFTE's flight test facility at Yanliang, Shaanxi Province.
Baghdad-1
Iraqi development with a radar mounted in the cargo hold enabling it to serve as AEW&C, used in the Iran–Iraq War.
Baghdad-2
Iraqi development (with French assistance) with fibreglass-reinforced plastic radome over the antenna of the Thomson-CSF Tiger G surveillance radar with a maximum detection range of 350 km (190 nmi; 220 mi). One was destroyed on the ground during the 1991 Persian Gulf War; two others were flown to Iran where they remained. At least one went into service with the IRIAF. One aircraft crashed following a midair collision with a HESA Saeqeh fighter, during the annual Iranian military parade in Tehran. It can be distinguished from the Beriev A-50 by having the Il-76 navigator windows in the nose, which the A-50 does not.

== Operators ==
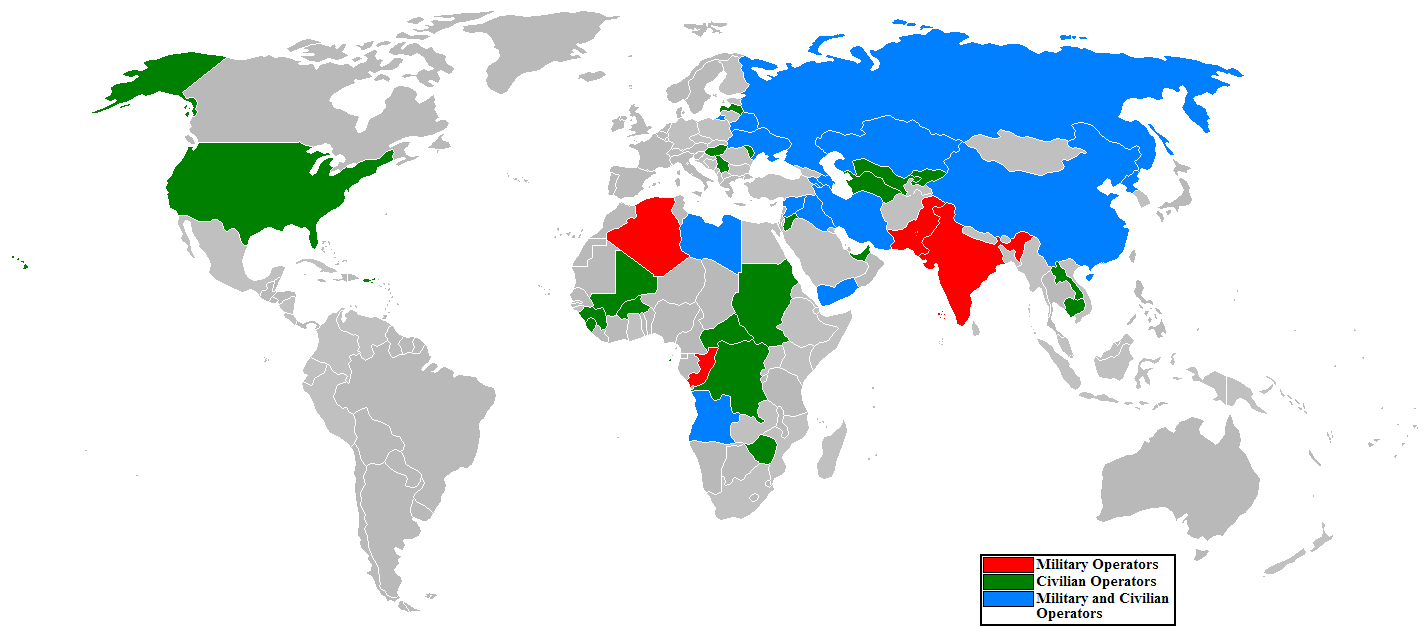
Present and former Il-76 operators Military operators Civilian operators Military and civilian operators

=== Military operators ===
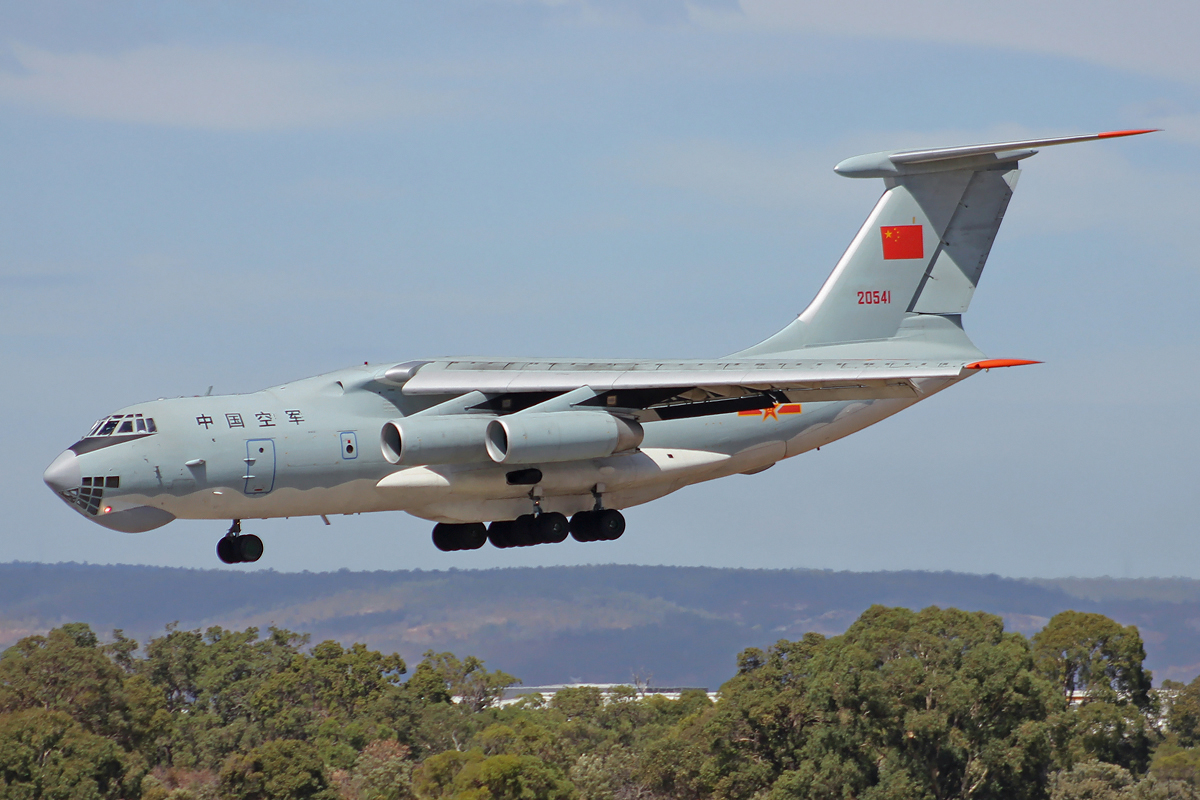
People's Liberation Army Air Force Il-76 landing at Perth Airport, Australia. This aircraft took part in the Search for Malaysia Airlines Flight 370.

Algeria

- Algerian Air Force – 11 Il-76MD / Il-76TD and 5 Il-78TD in service.

Angola

- National Air Force of Angola – 7 Il-76MD and Il-76TD in service.

Armenia

- Armenian Air Force – 3 Il-76M/Il-76TD in service.

Azerbaijan

- Azerbaijani Air Forces and Air Defense Troops – 2 Il-76TD in service.

Belarus

- Air Force and Air Defence Forces of Belarus – 2 Il-76MD in service.

China

- People's Liberation Army Air Force – 26 Il-76MD / Il-76TD, 3 Il-78M, and 4 KJ-2000 in service.

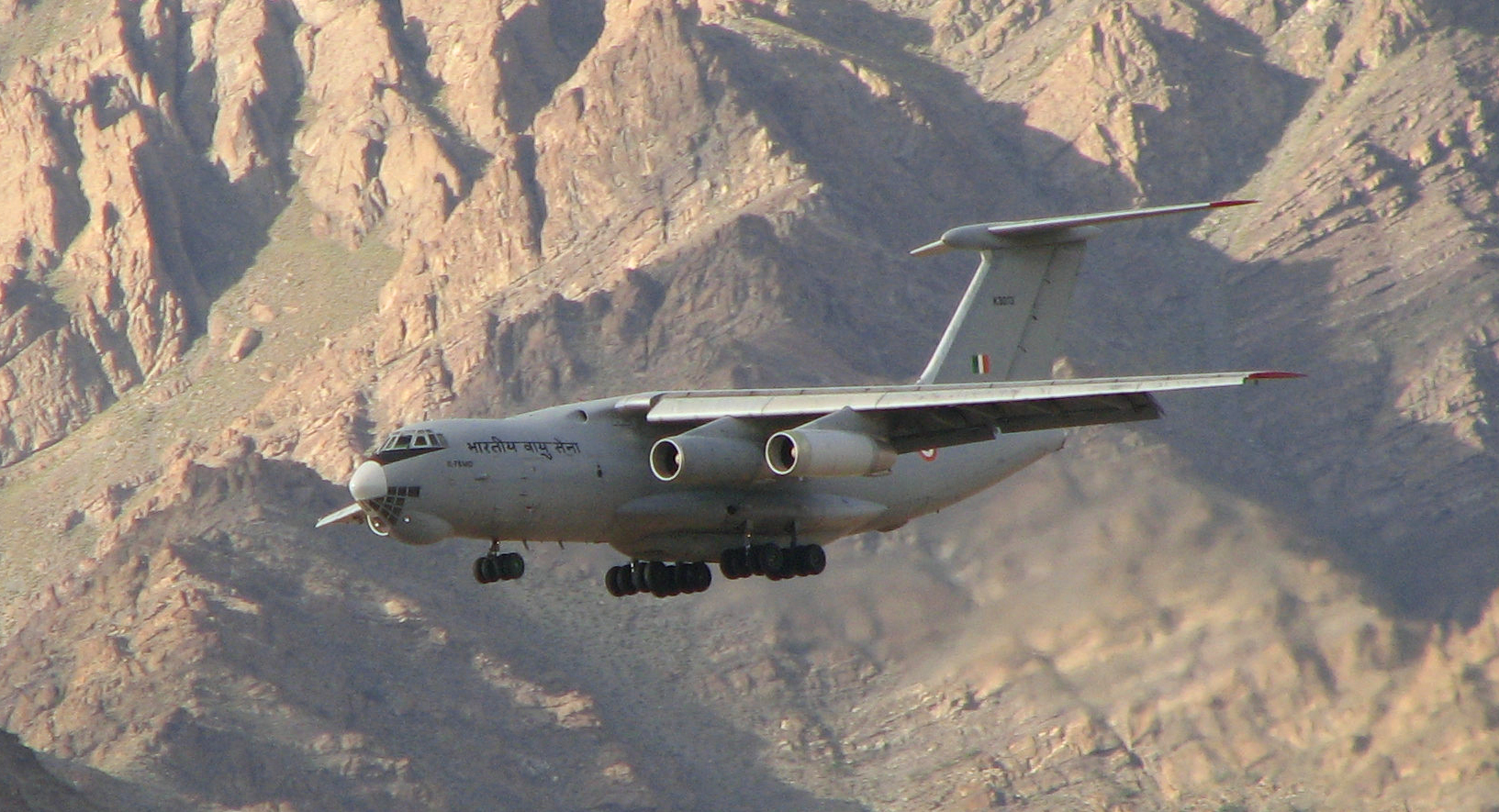
Indian Air Force Il-76 landing at Kushok Bakula Rimpochee Airport located in Leh

Democratic Republic of the Congo

- Air Force of the Democratic Republic of the Congo - 3 Il-76TD in service.

Egypt

- Egyptian Air Force – 2 Il-76MF in service.

Equatorial Guinea

- Equatorial Guinea National Guard - 1 Il-76TD in service.

India

- Indian Air Force – 17 Il-76MD, 6 Il-78MKI, and 3 A-50EI in service. 2 A-50EI on order.

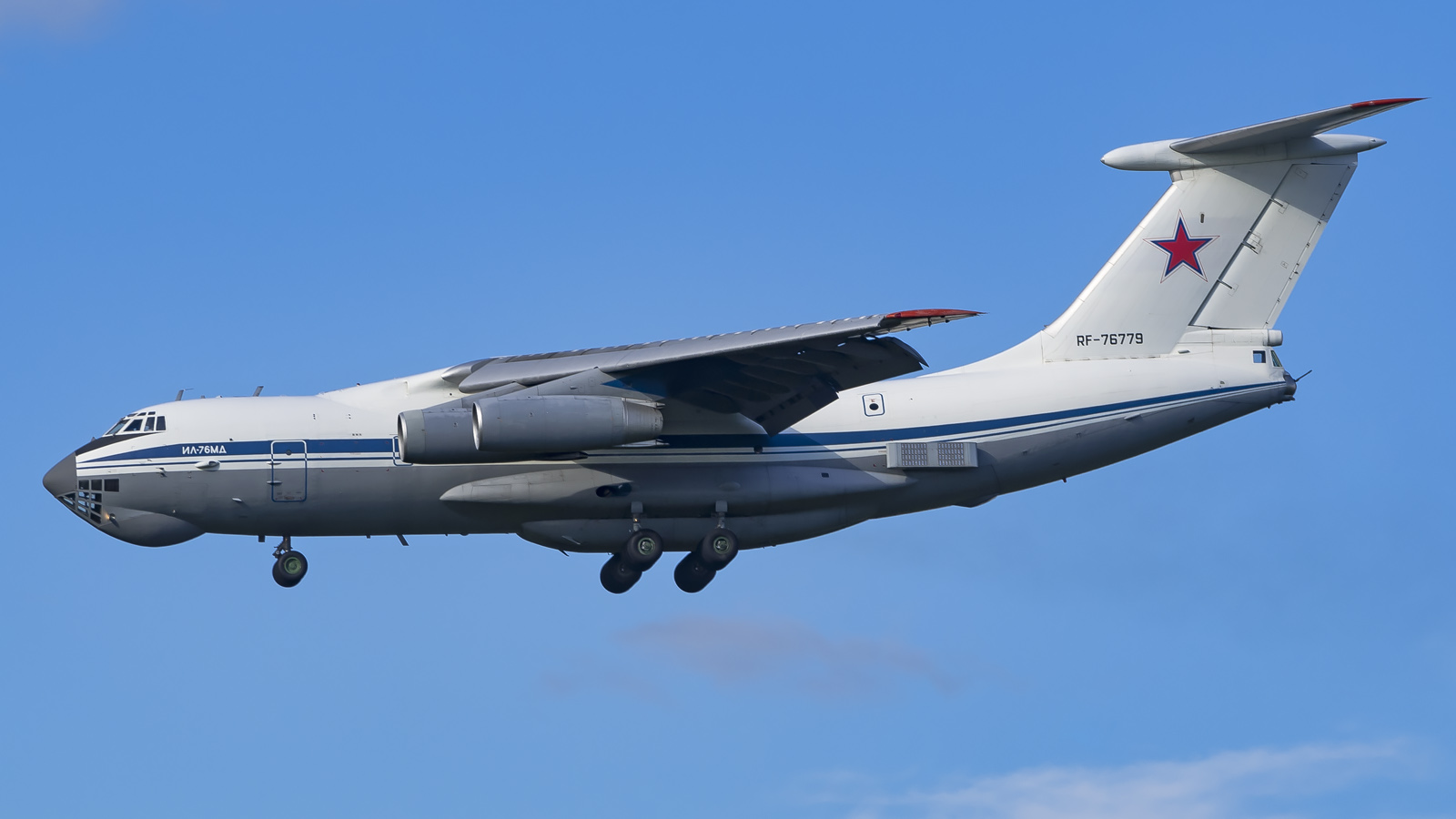
A Russian Air Force Il-76MD at Chkalovsky Air Base

Iran

- Islamic Republic of Iran Air Force – 6 Il-76TD in service.
- Islamic Revolutionary Guards Corps Aerospace Force – 3 Il-76MD / Il-76TD in service.

Jordan

- Royal Jordanian Air Force – 1 Il-76TD in service.

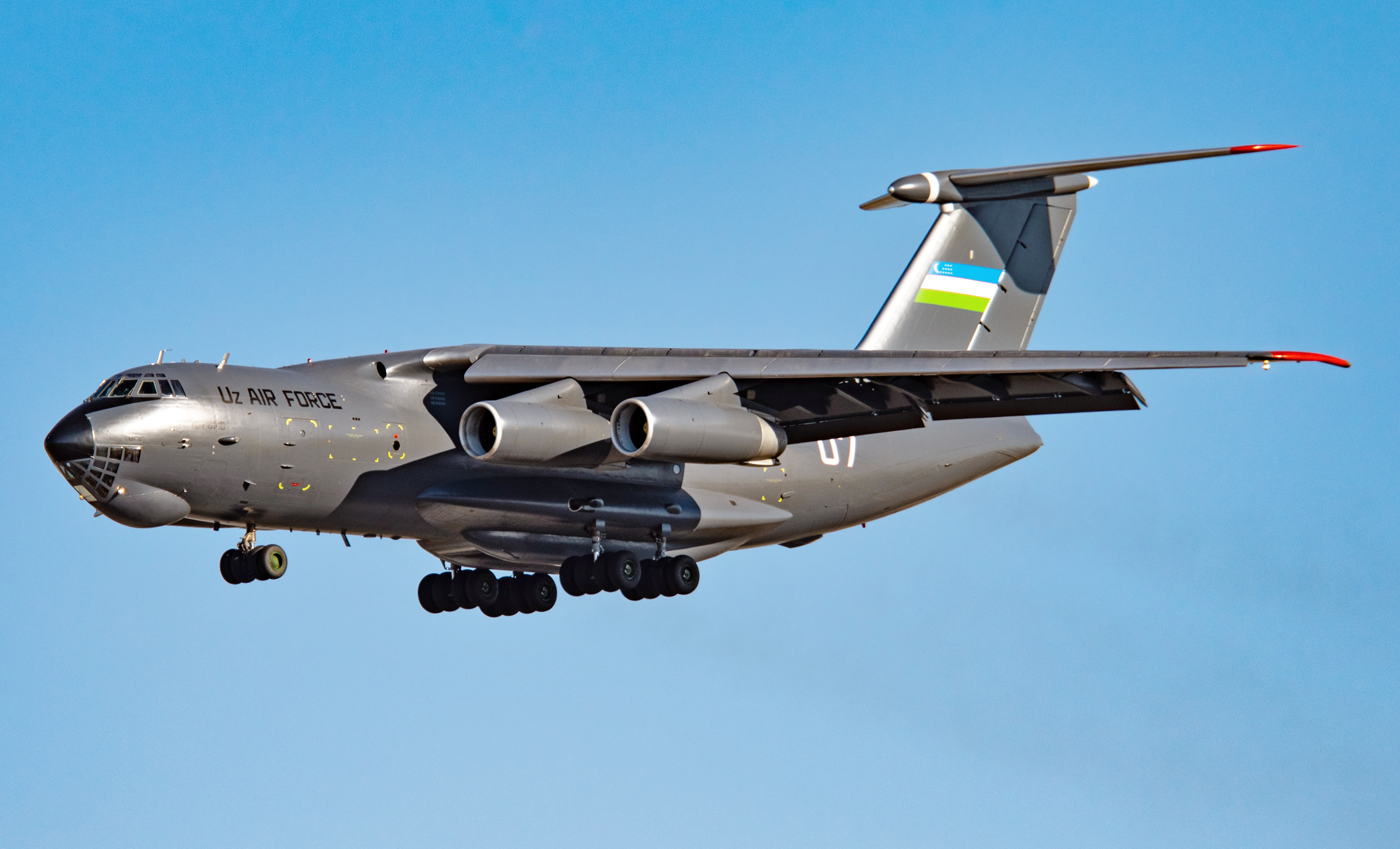
Uzbekistan Air and Air Defence Forces Il-76 landing at Beijing Capital International Airport

North Korea

- Korean People's Army Air Force - 1 modified Il-76TD for AEW&C

Russia

- Russian Aerospace Forces – Approximately 130 Il-76, 19 Il-78 and 12 A-50/A-100 in service. 7 Il-76MD-90A, 31 Il-78M-90A on order. More in reserve storage.
- National Guard of Russia – 9 Il-76M / Il-76MD in service.
- Border Service of the Federal Security Service of the Russian Federation - 3 in service.
- Rossiya - Special Flight Detachment

Sudan

- Sudanese Air Force – 1 Il-76TD in service

Ukraine

- Ukrainian Air Force - Unknown Il-76 in service

Uzbekistan

- Uzbekistan Air and Air Defence Forces – 3 Il-76MD in service.

=== Former military operators ===
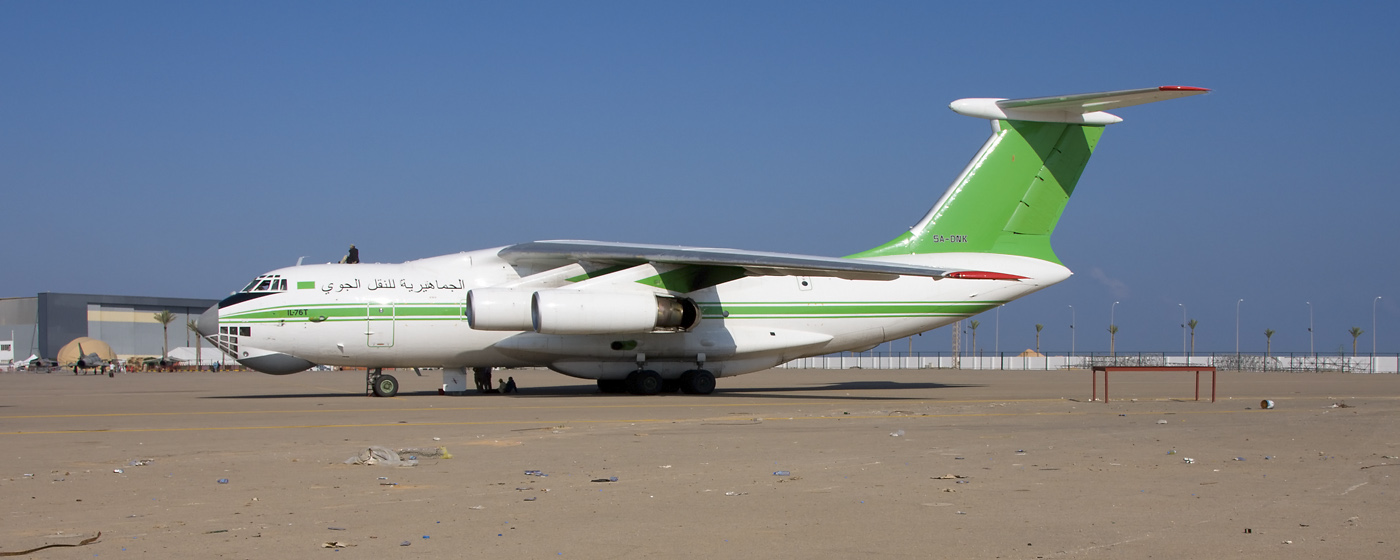
A Libyan Il-76 at Mitiga International Airport in 2009

Iraq

- Iraqi Air Force

Libya

- Libyan Air Force

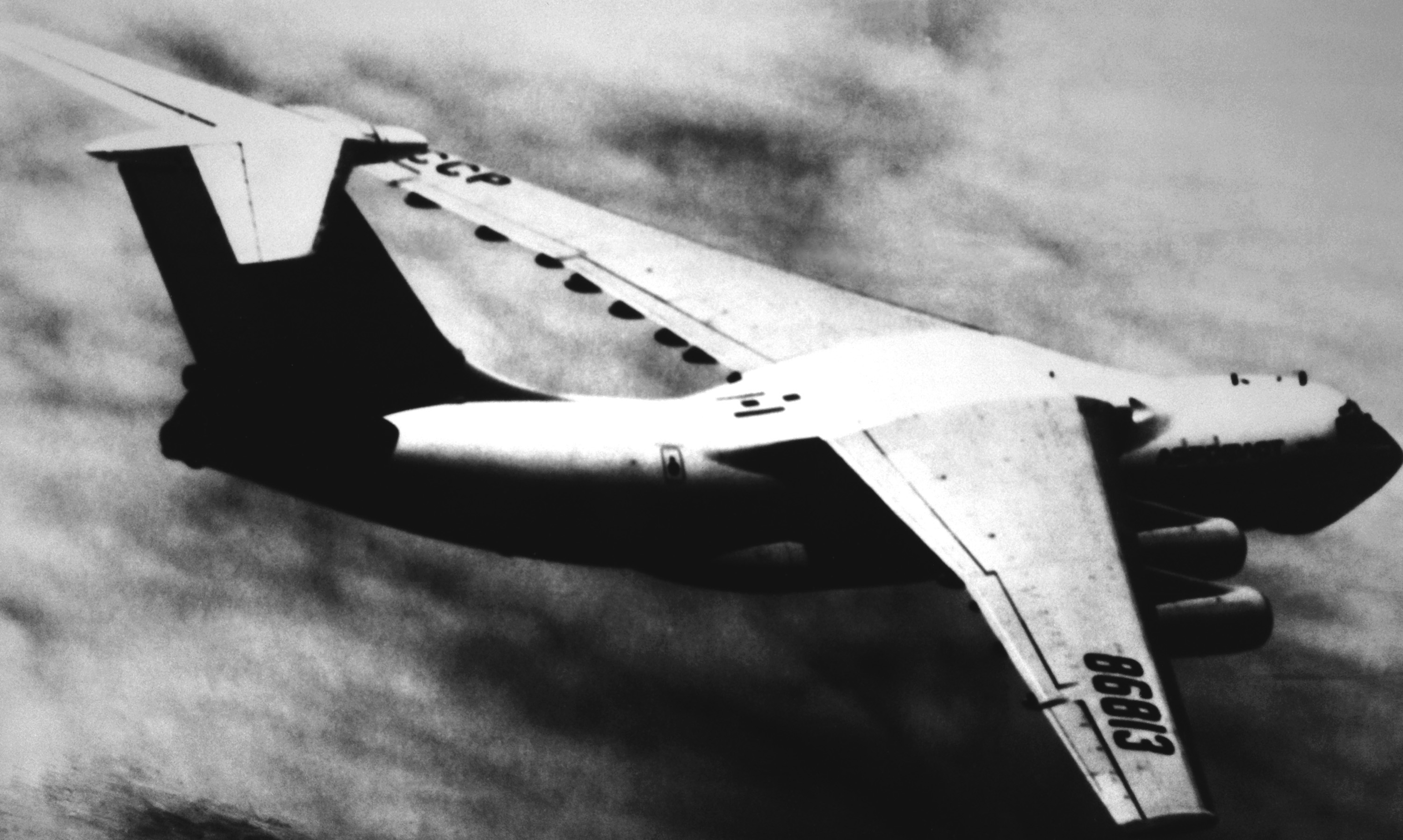
Il-76 of the Soviet Air Forces

Soviet Union

- Soviet Air Forces

Syria

- Syrian Arab Air Force operated four, including three Il-76Ms. They were shared with Syrian Arab Airlines. The Syrian government of Al-Assad fell to rebels in late 2024, and the Syrian Arab Air Force was dismantled. It was re-established as Syrian Air Force, but the revolution, and the Israeli air strikes that followed it, wrecked havoc in the inventory of the Air Force. In late 2025, the World Air Forces publication by FlightGlobal, which tracks the aircraft inventories of world's air forces and publishes its counts annually, removed all Syrian Air Force's aircraft from their World Air Forces 2026 report. It is thus questionable if the Syrian Air Force has any flying aircraft in their inventory, and in particular, any Il-76, as of December 2025.

Yemen

- Yemeni Air Force

Zimbabwe

- Air Force of Zimbabwe

=== Civil operators ===
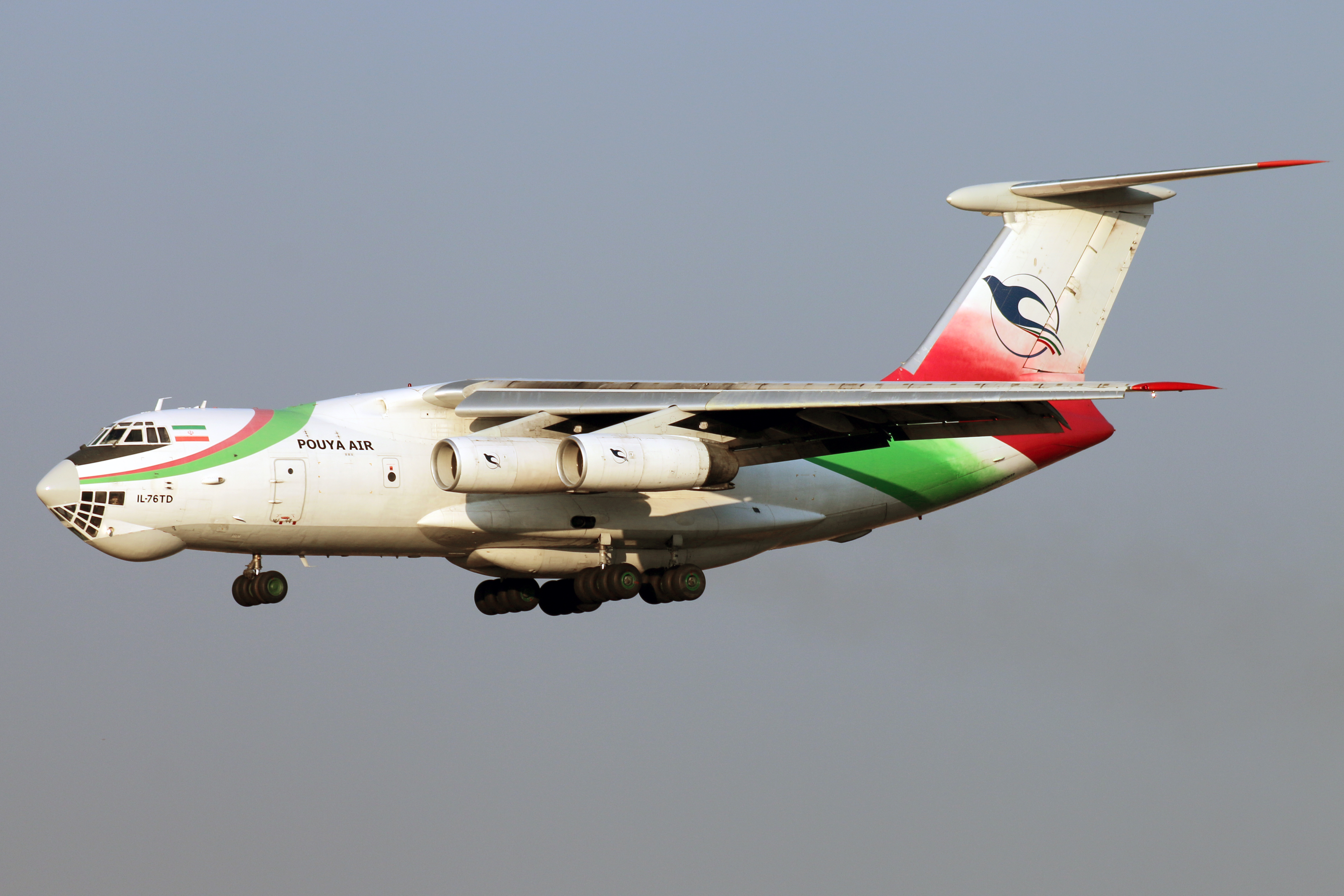
A Pouya Air Il-76 landing at Mehrabad Airport in Dec 2023

Azerbaijan

- Azal Avia Cargo
- Silk Way Airlines

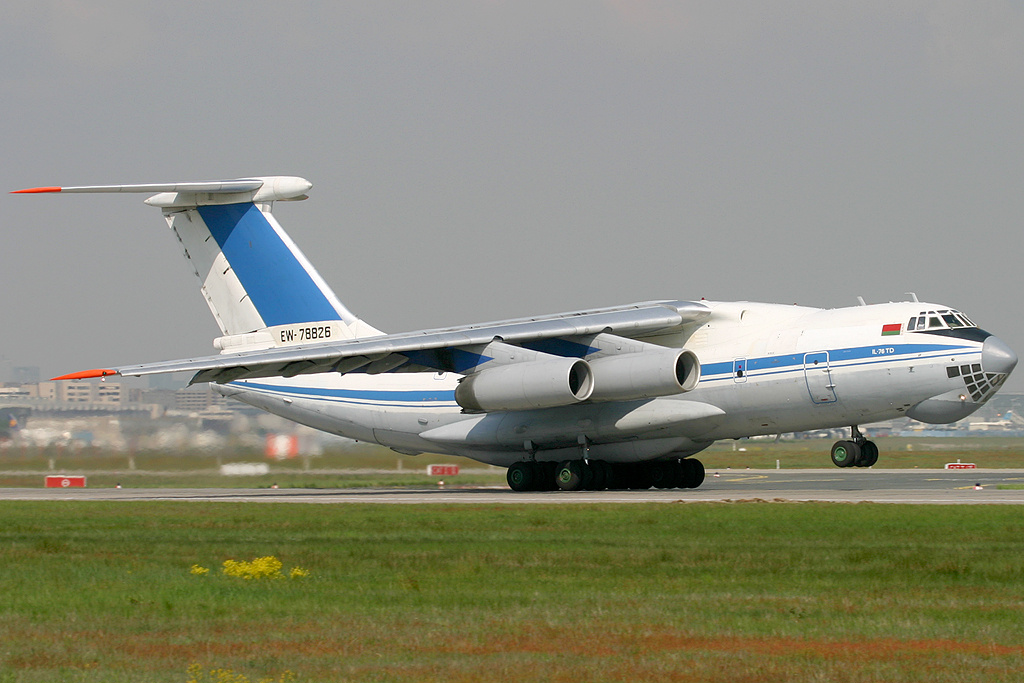
A TransAVIAexport Ilyushin Il-76TD at Frankfurt Airport

Belarus

- Belcanto Airlines
- TransAVIAexport Airlines

Kazakhstan

- Government of Kazakhstan

Kyrgyzstan

- Fly Sky Airlines operates two Il-76TD aircraft

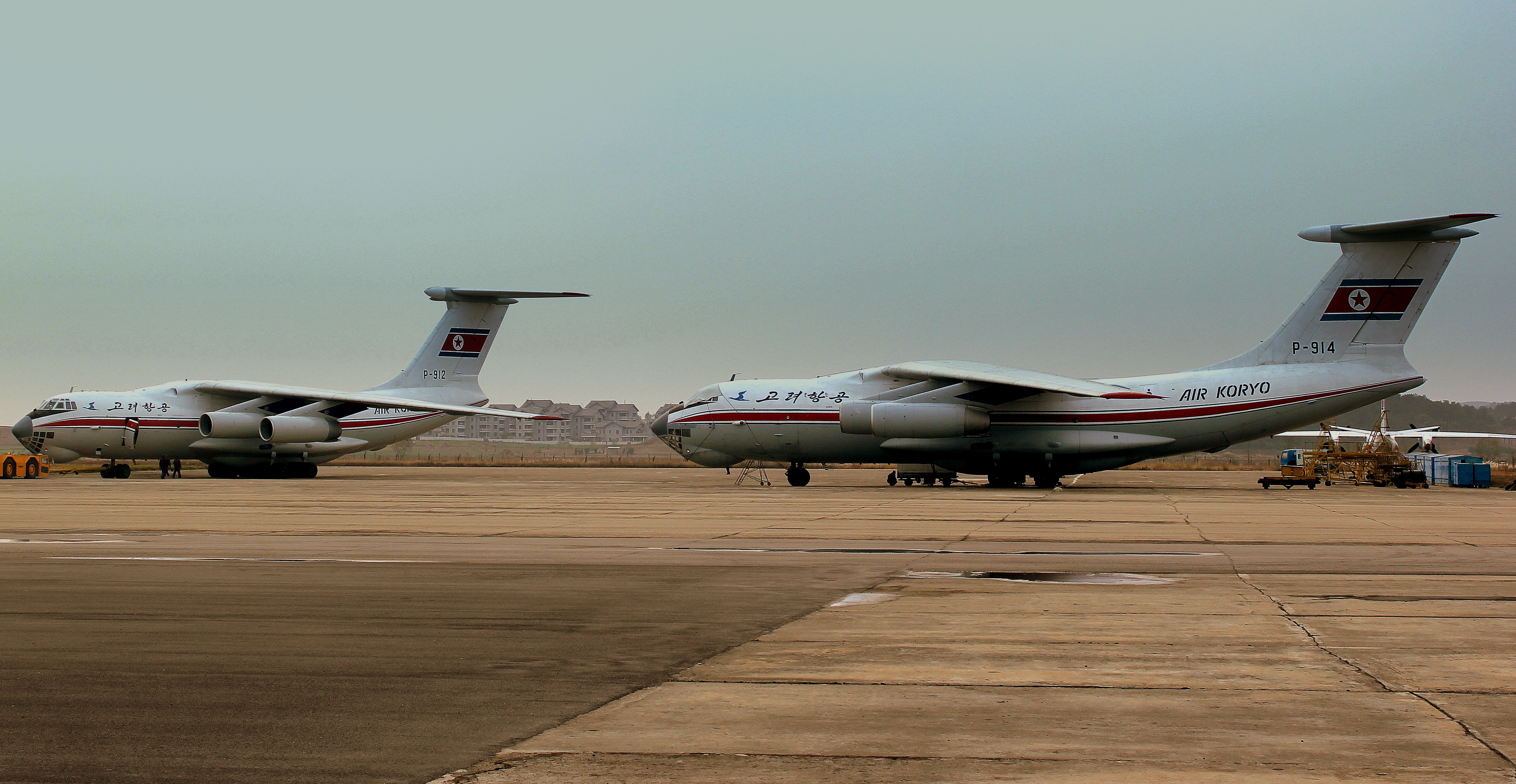
A pair of Air Koryo Ilyushin Il-76 aircraft at Pyongyang International Airport

North Korea

- Air Koryo

Russia

- Aviacon Zitotrans
- Ministry of Emergency Situations
- Roscosmos – reduced-gravity aircraft used for cosmonaut training by Yuri Gagarin Cosmonaut Training Center
- Volga-Dnepr Airlines

Turkmenistan

- Turkmenistan Airlines operates four Il-76TDs.

United Arab Emirates

- Maximus Air operates one IL-76TD.

United Nations

- The United Nations Humanitarian Air Service has operated several of the type from the early to mid-1990s to now. Most of them are either ex-Aeroflot or one that the Russian Aerospace Forces has lent to the UN.

United States

- Meridican, Inc, operating an Il-78 with registration N20NS.

Uzbekistan

- Uzbekistan Airways used to operate 14 Il-76TDs.

=== Former civil operators ===
Angola

- Angola Air Charter operated an Il-76.

Armenia

- Air Highnesses used to own and operate Il-76T (EK-76300) on behalf of Aéro-Service before it crashed.
- Dvin Airlines used to operate an Il-76TD.
- Yerevan-Avia used to operate two Il-76 (EK86724 and EK86817).

Bahrain

- Global Aviation Services

Belarus

- Belavia operated the Il-76 before its closure in 1999.
- Gomelavia operated five Il-76TD.

Burkina Faso
Cambodia

- Imtrec Aviation operated a Laotian registered Il-76.

Indonesia

- Penas Air Cargo

Democratic Republic of the Congo

- Air Congo operated an Il-76TD.

Republic of the Congo

- The Republic of the Congo operates an Il-76.
- Trans Air Congo has operated an Il-76T.

Cuba

- Cubana de Aviación used to operate two Il-76MDs.

Equatorial Guinea

- Ecuatorial Cargo operated one Il-76TD.
- Express International Cargo

Georgia

- Sun Way has operated the Il-76TD.

Hungary

- Atlant Hungary has operated the Il-76.
- Hungarian Ukrainian Air Cargo has operated the Il-76.

Iran

- Atlas Air has operated at least eight Il-76TD.
- Chabahar Air has operated at least two Il-76TD.
- Mahan Air has operated the Il-76.
- Payam Air operated two Il-76TD.
- Qeshm Air operated two Il-76TD (airline disestablished).
- Safiran Airlines
- Yas Air operated two Il-76TDs (registered as EP-GOL and EP-GOM).

Jordan

- Jordan International Air Cargo – has operated two Il-76MFs delivered in 2011. and operated for the Royal Jordanian Air Force which were sold to Egypt in 2018 and were delivered in 2019.

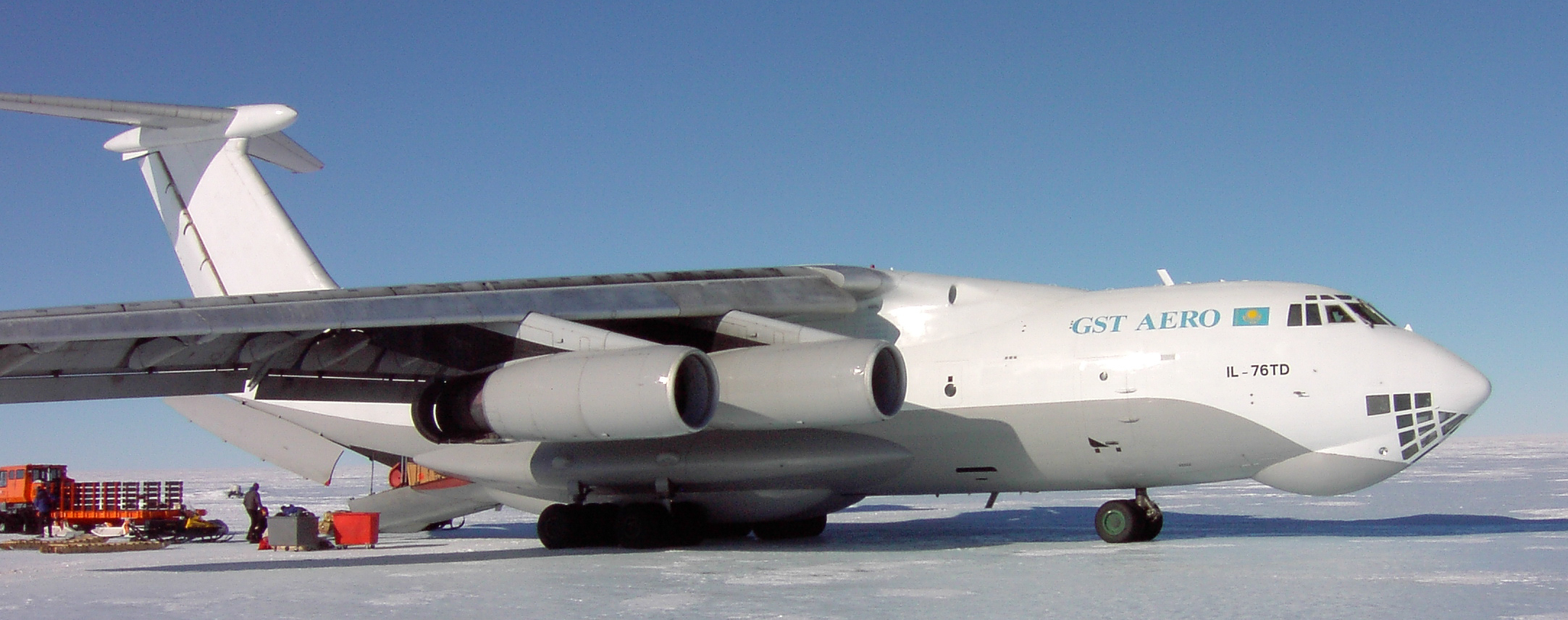
GST Aero Il-76 at Patriot Hills Base Camp, Antarctica

Kazakhstan

- Air Kazakhstan operated Il-76 aircraft until its closure in 2004.
- Kazakhstan Airlines operated the Il-76TD before its closure in 1997.
- Sayakhat Airlines operated the Il-76 previously.
- Air Almaty operates an Il-76TD for leased operations.
- GST Aero

Kyrgyzstan

- Botir Avia used to operate three, including one Il-76MD and two Il-76TD.
- Kyrgyzstan Airlines operates one Il-76TD.

Laos

- Imtrec aviation of Cambodia used to operate Laos registered Il-76TD.

Latvia

- Inversija operated four, including three Il-76Ts and one Il-76TD.

Libya

- Jamahiria Air Transport operated five Il-76M and 12 Il-76TD.
- Libyan Air Cargo, the cargo division of Libyan Arab Airlines, operates 21, including one Il-76M and 15 Il-76TD.

Mali

- Transafrica Airlines

Moldova

- Aerocom operated an Il-76MD as well as an Il-76T until as late as January 2005.
- Airline Transport operated a number of Il-76 aircraft, losing three in accidents in 2004 and 2005.
- Jet Line International used to operate the Il-76.
- Tiramavia

Russia

- Aeroflot operated large numbers of aircraft, especially during Soviet years, often on behalf of the Soviet military. However, none remain in service with the airline.
- Air STAN operated an Il-76TD.
- ALAK operated Il-76 aircraft before its closure in 1999.
- ATLANT-SOYUZ operated several Il-76TD
- Aviaenergo operated the aircraft, but none remain in service.
- Continental Airways has operated the Il-76 in the past, but does not do so currently.
- Dacono Air has operated the Il-76.
- Domodedovo Airlines has operated the Il-76, but none is currently in service.
- East Line used to operate the Il-76.
- Ilavia Airline used to operate six, including two Il-76MDs and four Il-76TDs.
- KrasAir operated the Il-76, but none is currently in service.
- Krylo Airlines operated two Il-76TDs into 2005.
- Moscow Airways operated an Il-76TD in the early 1990s.
- Novosibirsk Air Enterprise operated the Il-76, but none is currently in service.
- Pulkovo Aviation Enterprise operated the Il-76, but none is currently in service.
- Red Wings Airlines used to operate two Il-76TDs.
- Royal Flight
- Spair Airlines
- Tesis Aviation Enterprise used to operate nine Il-76TDs.
- Tyumen Airlines
- Uralinteravia

Serbia

- Air Tomisko operated 3 Il-76TDs. Two were leased from GST Aero which had been before in service of Kosmas Air, and one more was added in May 2006.
- Kosmas Air operated two Il-76TDs leased from GST Aero.

Sierra Leone

- Aerolift Sierra Leone used to operate Il-76 aircraft for special charter and cargo lift operations.

Soviet Union

- Aeroflot was the main civil user of the aircraft during the period of the Soviet Union, although many of its aircraft were operated on behalf of the military.
- Jet Air Cargo was one of the first civil operators of the Il-76 in Russia other than Aeroflot.

Sudan

- Air West operated at least six aircraft, although it is unclear how many remain in service.
- East West Cargo operated a number of Il-76s.
- Juba Air Cargo operated the Il-76.
- Badr Airlines operated two Il-76s.
- Trans Attico operated two Il-76TDs.
- Alfa Airlines
- Azza Transport used to operate two Il-76TDs.
- Green Flag Airlines

Syria

- Syrian Arab Airlines operated four, including three Il-76Ms. They were shared with Syrian Arab Air Force. The Syrian government of Al-Assad fell to rebels in late 2024, and the Syrian Arab Air Force was dismantled. It was re-established as Syrian Air Force, but the revolution, and the Israeli air strikes that followed it, wrecked havoc in the inventory of the Air Force. In late 2025, the World Air Forces publication by FlightGlobal, which tracks the aircraft inventories of world's air forces and publishes its counts annually, removed all Syrian Air Force's aircraft from their World Air Forces 2026 report. It is thus questionable if the Syrian Air Force has any flying aircraft in their inventory, and in particular, any Il-76, as of December 2025. Since the Il-76 were shared with Syrian Arab Airlines, the same can be said about Syrian Arab Airlines as well.

Ukraine

- Air Service Ukraine operated the Il-76MD.
- Air Ukraine and Air Ukraine Cargo operated the aircraft, although none were in service at the time of bankruptcy.
- ATI Aircompany operated a number of Il-76 models.
- ATLANT-SV AIRLINES operated over 40 Il-76TD
- Azov Avia Airlines operated two Il-76MDs.
- BSL Airline operated as many as six Il-78s.
- Busol Airlines operated the Il-76 before its closure in 1998.
- Khors Aircompany operated two Il-76MDs.
- Lviv Airlines operates three Il-76MDs.
- South Airlines
- Ukraine Air Alliance operated four, including one Il-76MD and three Il-76TDs.
- Ukrainian Cargo Airways operated 21, including 19 Il-76MDs.
- Volare Airlines operated three, including two Il-76MDs and one Il-76TD.
- Veteran Airlines
- Yuzhmashavia operated two Il-76TDs.

Uzbekistan

- Avialeasing operated the Il-76 on a charter and lease basis.

United Arab Emirates

- Gulf Aviation Technology and Services operated a number of Il-76 aircraft on charter or lease.
- Phoenix Aviation used to operate 2 Il-76TDs.

Yemen

- Yemenia operated two Il-76TDs.

== Accidents and incidents ==
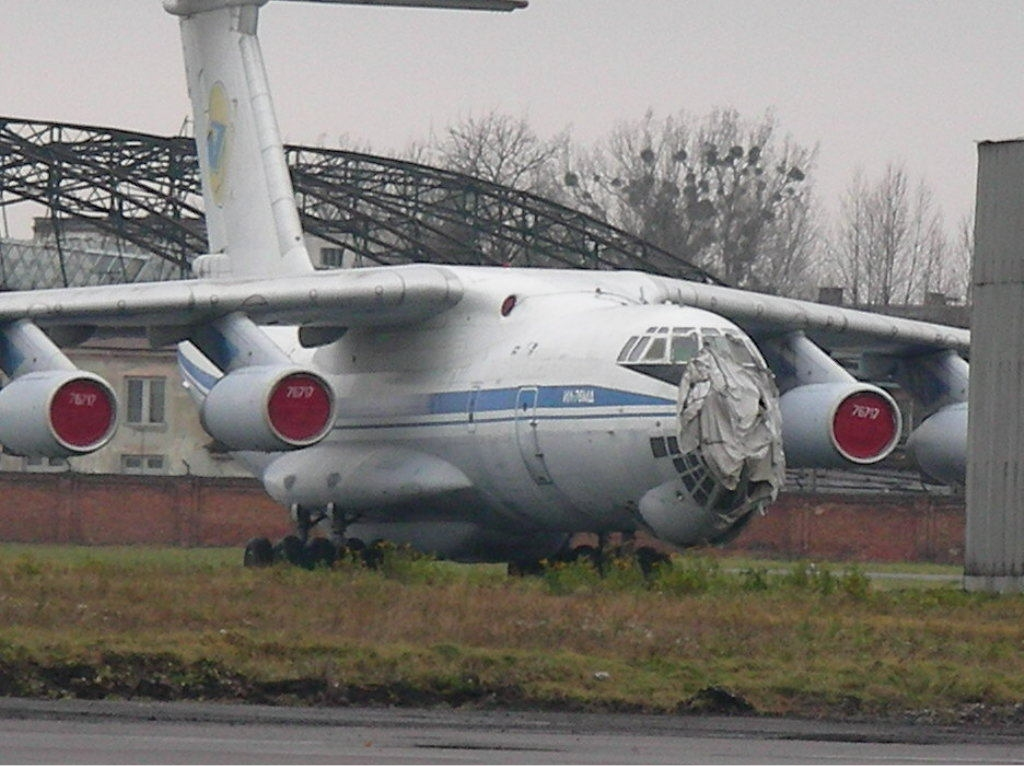
An Il-76MD that was damaged during the Sknyliv air show disaster on 27 July 2002, during which the Sukhoi Su-27 involved struck a glancing blow against the aircraft's nose before crashing into spectators

As of July 2024, the Aviation Safety Network has tracked 137 incidents involving Il-76 series aircraft resulting in the 1,158 fatalities. 99 have been written off in crashes and other accidents. Some of the most notable incidents can be found here.

- On 23 November 1979, a Soviet Air Forces Il-76, registration CCCP-86714, banked left during an approach to Vitebsk Airport. Control of the aircraft was lost and the aircraft crashed, killing the crew of seven; this was the first loss of an Il-76.
- Christmas day crash. On 25 December 1979, a Soviet Air Force Il-76 crashed 36 km from Kabul, killing 48 onboard.
- 1988 Soviet Air Force Il-76 crash. On 11 December 1988, an Aeroflot Il-76 crashed on approach to Leninakan, Armenia killing 77 of the 78 on board. The aircraft was on an air relief operation following the 1988 Armenian earthquake.
- Soviet Air Force Ilyushin Il-76 crash. On 18 October 1989, a Soviet Air Force Il-76 (CCCP-76569) crashed in the Caspian Sea off Sumqayit, Azerbaijan following wing separation caused by an engine fire, killing all 57 in Azerbaijan's deadliest air accident. The cause of the engine fire was traced back to a design flaw.

=== 1990s ===
- On 1 February 1990, a Soviet Air Forces Il-76 registration СССР-86021 crashed 14 minutes after takeoff from Panevėžys Air Base, killing all 8 members of the crew.
- On 24 May 1991, a Metro Cargo Il-76TD (LZ-INK, named Lugano), crashed near Kermanshah Airport while attempting a forced landing following fuel exhaustion, killing four of ten crew.
- On 8 July 1993, a Russian Air Force Il-76M (RA-86039) crashed near Pskov Airport due to loss of control following an unexplained in-flight fire, killing the 11 crew.
- 1995 Airstan Ilyushin Il-76 hijacking. On 3 August 1995 Taliban-controlled fighter aircraft intercepted an Airstan Ilyushin Il-76TD transport aircraft, and held its seven crew members for over a year before escaping.
- On 19 August 1996, Spair Airlines Flight 3601, an Il-76T, crashed while trying to land at Belgrade Nikola Tesla Airport following total electrical failure due to pilot error, killing all 11 occupants on board. The crew had forgotten to turn on the AC/DC converter following engine startup.
- Charkhi Dadri mid-air collision. On 12 November 1996, Kazakhstan Airlines Flight 1907, an Il-76, collided in mid-air with Saudia Flight 763 (a Boeing 747) over Charkhi Dadri, India, killing all 349 aboard both aircraft in the deadliest mid-air collision. The Kazakh crew failed to maintain altitude owing to confusion with ATC.
- 1996 Abakan Ilyushin Il-76 crash. On 27 November 1996, a Russian Air Force Ilyushin Il-76MD, registration RA-78804, flew into the side of a mountain, minutes after it departed Abakan Airport, and crashed 14 kilometres (8.7 mi) from the airport. All 21 occupants on board died in the accident.
- On 13 July 1998, ATI Aircompany Flight 2570, an Il-76MD (UR-76424), crashed in the sea shortly after takeoff from Ras Al Khaimah International Airport, killing the eight crew. The aircraft was overloaded and the pilot failed to respond to GPWS warnings.
- On 17 July 1998, Air Sofia Flight 701, an Il-78 (UR-UCI) struck a hill on approach to Asmara International Airport, killing all ten on board. The aircraft was leased from Ukrainian Cargo Airways.

=== 2000s ===
- Armed Forces of the Russian Federation Flight 9064. On 2 December 2001, a military flight from Bratsk Airport to Petropavlovsk-Kamchatsky Airport crashed at Novaya Inya, Russia, following an onboard fire, killing 18 on board.
- Rus Flight 9633. On 14 July 2001 a cargo flight from Chkalovsky Airport crashed shortly after takeoff, killing 10 persons on board the aircraft.
- On 31 January 2003 a cargo flight from Macau to Baucau Airport, Timor-Leste impacted terrain while on approach, killing all six on board.
- 2003 Iran Ilyushin Il-76 crash. On 19 February 2003, an Ilyushin Il-76 crashed near Kerman, Iran under unspecified reasons (possibly weather-related). The crash killed 275 people, including hundreds of the Iranian Revolutionary Guard. The accident remains the deadliest involving the Il-76.
- 2003 Ukrainian Cargo Airways Il-76 accident. On 8 May 2003, the rear loading ramp of an Il-76 leased by the Congolese government unexpectedly opened at 10,000 feet after taking off from the capital Kinshasa. Initial reports stated that over 120 policemen and their families had been sucked out in 45 minutes, but 14 people actually died.
- 2007 Mogadishu TransAVIAexport Airlines Il-76 crash. On 23 March 2007, an Il-76 of TransAVIAexport Airlines registered EW-78849 was reportedly shot down (the official cause is undetermined) in the outskirts of Mogadishu, Somalia, killing all 11 people on board.
- On 30 June 2008, an Ababeel Aviation Il-76 crashed while taking off from Khartoum on a relief flight, killing the 4 crew members, the only people on board the plane.
- On 2 July 2008, Click Airways Flight 1002, operated using an Ilyushin Il-76TD from Bagram Air Base to Al-Fujairah-Fujairah International Airport, suffered an uncontained engine failure of its no. 3 engine at FL280. The failed engine parts struck the no. 4 engine resulting in its failure, as well as the fuselage and fuel tanks. The flight crew managed to successfully make an emergency landing at Zahedan, Iran. None of the three crew sustained injuries.
- 2009 Makhachkala Il-76 collision. On 15 January 2009, two Russian Ministry of Interior Il-76MDs were involved in a ground collision at Makhachkala Airport. One of the aircraft, registration RA-76825, was ready to depart and was positioned at the runway end when the other one, RA-76827, came in to land. The wing of the landing aircraft struck the flight deck of RA-76825 and a fire erupted. There were three fatalities in the departing aircraft, out of seven occupants on board. None of the 31 occupants aboard RA-76827 were hurt. RA-76825 was written off as a consequence of the accident.
- 2009 Aerolift Ilyushin Il-76 crash. On 9 March 2009, an Aerolift Il-76 (S9-SAB) crashed into Lake Victoria just after takeoff from Entebbe Airport, Uganda, killing all 11 people on board. Two of the engines had caught fire on takeoff. The aircraft was chartered by Dynacorp on behalf of AMISOM. The accident was investigated by Uganda's Ministry of Transport, which concluded that all four engines were time-expired and that Aerolift's claim that maintenance had been performed to extend their service lives and the certification of this work could not be substantiated.
- 2009 Iranian Air Force Ilyushin Il-76 accident. On 22 September 2009, Islamic Republic of Iran Air Force Il-76MD Adnan 2 "5-8208" Simorgh crashed near Varamin killing all seven people on board. The crash was possibly the result of a mid-air collision with a Northrop F-5E Tiger II.
- 2009 Yakutia Ilyushin Il-76 crash. On 1 November 2009, an Il-76 belonging to the Russian Ministry of the Interior crashed near the city of Mirny within 2 kilometers after taking off. Eleven people on board were confirmed as killed.

=== 2010s ===
- Sun Way Flight 4412. On 28 November 2010, Il-76 4L-GNI crashed in a populated area of Karachi, Pakistan, shortly after taking off from Jinnah International Airport. All eight people on board were killed, along with two people on the ground. The aircraft was reported to have been trying to return to Jinnah after suffering an uncontained engine failure and fire.
- Silk Way Airlines Flight 995. On 6 July 2011, an Il-76, tail number 4K-AZ55, crashed into a mountain in Afghanistan, while on final to Bagram Air Force Base. Eight people on board were initially confirmed as killed, with one unaccounted.
- 2012 Aéro-Service Ilyushin Il-76 crash. On 30 November 2012, an Aéro-Service Il-76T (also reported as being operated by Trans Air Congo in the days after the accident) crashed 850 meters short of runway 5L of the Congo's Maya-Maya Airport in Brazzaville while landing during a violent storm, killing 32, including the 5 aircrew, another person on board and 26 people on the ground.
- 2014 Ukrainian Air Force Il-76 shootdown. On 14 June 2014 an Ilyushin Il-76 transport aircraft of the 25th Transport Aviation Brigade of the Ukrainian Air Force was shot down on approach to land at Luhansk International Airport, Ukraine.
- 2016 Russian Ministry of Emergency Situations Il-76 crash. On 1 July 2016, a Russian Ministry of Emergency Situations (EMERCOM) Il-76TD (RA-76840) struck a hillside near Rybnyi Uyan while fighting wildfires near Irkutsk, killing all ten on board.
- 2018 Algerian Air Force Ilyushin Il-76 crash. On 11 April 2018, Algerian Air Force Ilyushin Il-76 7T-WIV crashed shortly after take-off from Boufarik Airport, Boufarik, Algeria. All 257 people on board were killed, making the accident the deadliest air crash on Algerian soil.

=== 2020s ===
- 25 February 2022, during the 2022 Russian invasion of Ukraine, the Ukrainian State Special Communications Agency and US officials claimed that Russian Il-76s were shot down over Bila Tserkva. As of September 2022, no wreckage of the planes has been found.
- 4 April 2022, photographs of two destroyed Il-76s from the Ukrainian 25th Transport Aviation Brigade were displayed; these cargo planes were destroyed on the ground by Russian forces at Melitopol Airport.
- 2022 Russian Air Force Ilyushin Il-76 crash. On 24 June 2022, Russian Aerospace Forces Il-76MD RF-78778 crashed and caught fire while landing near the city of Ryazan following an engine fire, killing five of nine on board.
- 30 August 2023, four Il-76s were reportedly destroyed by Ukrainian kamikaze drone strikes at Pskov Airport.
- 2023 Gao Ilyushin Il-76 crash. On 23 September 2023, an Il-76 operated by the Malian Armed Forces crashed upon landing at Gao Airport, Mali. According to the French newspaper Le Monde, Malian officials confirmed the aircraft's being owned by the Army and having Wagner Group members on board. The aircraft overshot more than half of the available runway before touching down. For reasons unknown the crew failed to execute a go-around in due time which led to the aircraft rolling down the embankment at the end of the runway. The aircraft exploded killing all personnel on board.
- On the night of 19–20 October 2023, a Il-76MD military transport plane caught fire during take-off from a military airfield in Dushanbe, the capital of Tajikistan. A wheel exploded on the plane during acceleration, causing a fire to break out. The plane rolled out of the runway and burned down completely. It is known that there were eight people on board. The crew was not injured.
- 2024 Korochansky Ilyushin Il-76 crash. On 24 January 2024, a Russian Air Force Ilyushin Il-76 crashed in the Korochansky District in the Belgorod Oblast of Russia. The Russian Ministry of Defense stated it was carrying 65 Ukrainian Armed Forces POW, with 6 crew members and 3 security forces at the time. This was refuted by Ukrainian sources citing flight direction, photos of the crash site and other classified information leaked from Russia.
- 2024 Ivanovo Ilyushin Il-76 crash. On 12 March 2024, an Il-76 crashed in Ivanovo oblast. According to RIA Novosti, the engine caught on fire after the take-off from the Ivanovo air base, and the aircraft crashed when attempting an emergency landing back at the air base. There were eight crew members and seven passengers. All eight crew and seven passengers were killed in the crash.
- 2024 New Way Cargo Airlines Ilyushin Il-76 shootdown. On 21 October 2024, an Il-76 was shot down over Sudan killing all five crew members onboard.
- On 6 May 2025, a Yemen Air Force Il-76TD was destroyed by an Israeli missile strike.

== Aircraft on display ==
- CCCP-76511 (c/n 083414444) preserved in the Ukraine State Aviation Museum, Kyiv. The aircraft was originally painted as UR-UCI of Ukrainian Cargo Airways to commemorate the real aircraft that crashed in 1998, but was returned to its original Aeroflot livery as CCCP-76511 in 2016.
- An Ilyushin Il-76 in Umm Al Quwain, the United Arab Emirates sat abandoned by the side of a highway from 2000 to 2022, acting as an advertising billboard for a local beach resort. It later became a tourist destination. It was then scrapped in May 2022.

== Specifications (Il-76MD-90AE) ==

Data from UAC,Rosoboronexport, Ilyushin, Aviadvigatel, Volga-Dnepr Airlines.

General characteristics

- Crew: 5
- Capacity: Il-76M 42,000 kg (93,000 lb); Il-76MD 48,000 kg (106,000 lb); Il-76MD-90A 60,000 kg (130,000 lb)
- Length: 46.6 m (152 ft 11 in)
- Wingspan: 50.5 m (165 ft 8 in)
- Height: 14.42 m (47 ft 4 in)
- Wing area: 300 m^{2} (3,200 sq ft)
- Empty weight: 92,500 kg (203,928 lb) Il-76TD-90
- Max takeoff weight: 210,000 kg (462,971 lb) Il-76MD-90A
- Powerplant: 4 × Aviadvigatel PS-90A-76 turbofans, 156.9 kN (35,300 lbf) thrust each

Performance

- Cruise speed: 750–800 km/h (470–500 mph, 400–430 kn)
- Range: 5,000 km (3,100 mi, 2,700 nmi) Il-76MD-90A with 52 t (51 long tons; 57 short tons) payload.
- Ferry range: 9,700 km (6,000 mi, 5,200 nmi) Il-76MD-90A with no payload.
- Service ceiling: 12,200 m (40,000 ft)
- Thrust/weight: 0.32 at 200 t (200 long tons; 220 short tons) take-off weight and max. take-off thrust
- Minimum landing run: 450 m (1,480 ft) with thrust reversers

Armament

- Guns: 2 × 23 mm (0.906 in) cannon in radar-directed manned turret at base of tail
- Bombs: Some military models have four hardpoints under each outer wing capable of supporting 500 kg (1,100 lb) bombs.

== See also ==
- Airlift
- Military transport aircraft

Related development

- Beriev A-50
- Beriev A-100
- Ilyushin Il-78

Aircraft of comparable role, configuration, and era

- Lockheed C-141 Starlifter
- Xi'an Y-20
- Boeing C-17 Globemaster III

Related lists

- List of aircraft
- List of civil aircraft
