= Inversija =

Airline based in Riga, Latvia

IATA	ICAO	Call sign
IA	INV	INVERS
- Founded: 1991
- Ceased operations: 2012
- Hubs: Riga International Airport
- Fleet size: 3
- Headquarters: Riga, Latvia

Inversija was a cargo airline based in Riga, Latvia. It started operations in March 1991 and undertook all types of cargo operations, as well as maintenance work for third parties. Its main base was Riga International Airport. In 2012, the airline ceased all operations.

== Fleet ==
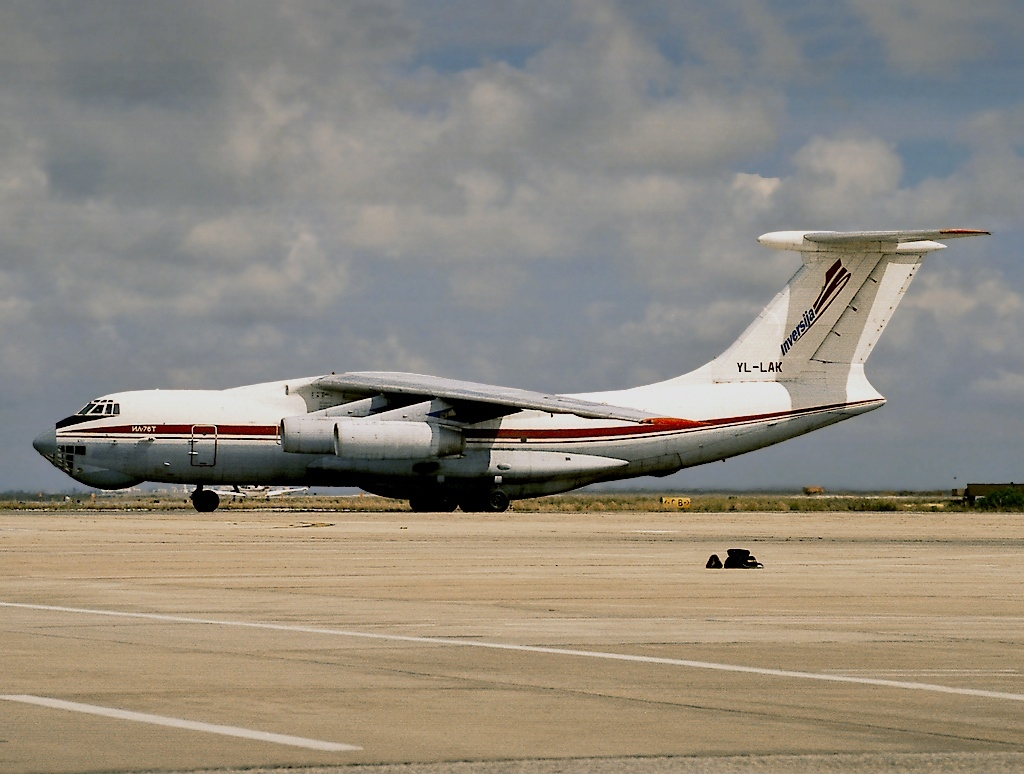
Il-76T

The Inversija fleet consisted of the following aircraft (at March 2007):

- 2 Ilyushin Il-76T
- 1 Ilyushin Il-76TD
