= Armed Forces of the Russian Federation Flight 9064 =

2001 aviation accident

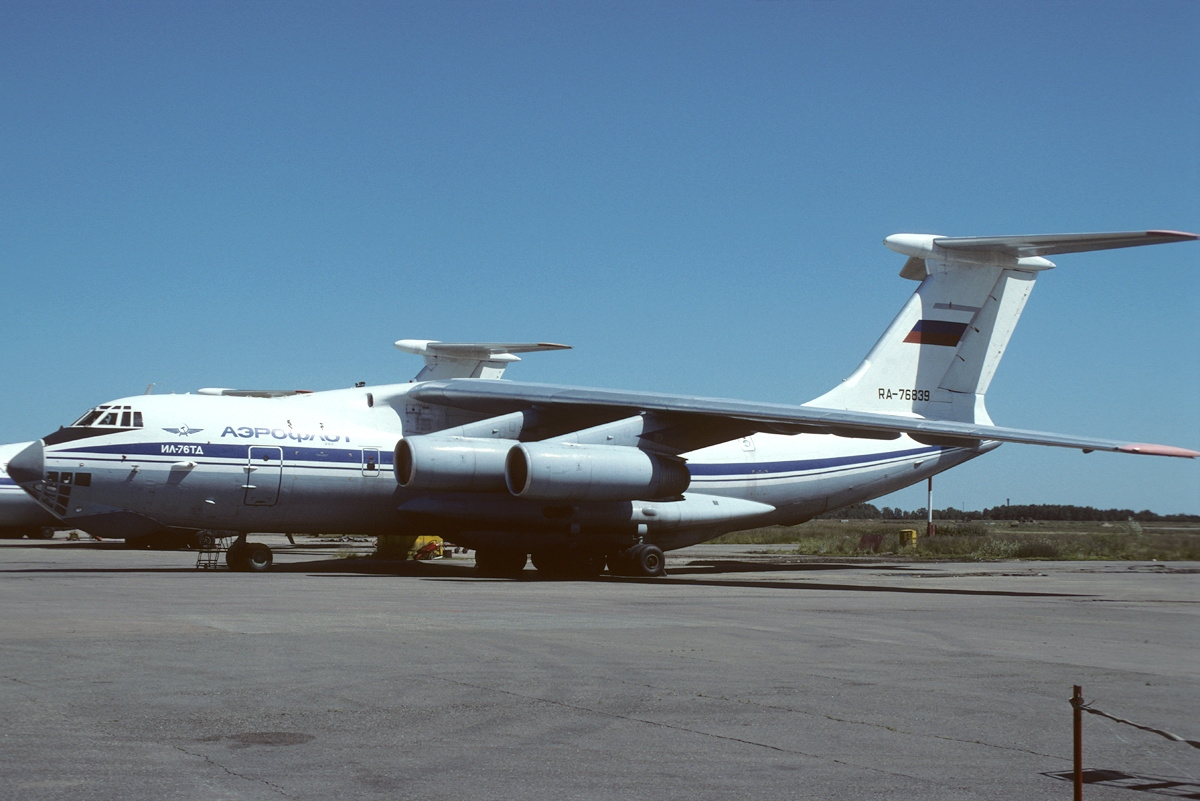
- The aircraft involved in the crash seen at Moscow Sheremetyevo Airport in 1994

Occurrence
- Date: 1 December 2001
- Summary: In-flight fire leading to loss of control
- Site: Novaya Inya, Russia

Aircraft
- Aircraft type: Ilyushin Il-76TD
- Operator: Border Guard Service of Russia for the Armed Forces of the Russian Federation
- Registration: RA-76839
- Flight origin: Bratsk Airport, Russia
- Destination: Petropavlovsk-Kamchatsky Airport, Russia
- Passengers: 9
- Crew: 9
- Fatalities: 18
- Survivors: 0

Armed Forces of the Russian Federation Flight 9064 was a military flight from Bratsk Airport to Petropavlovsk-Kamchatsky Airport with 9 passengers and 9 crew aboard. The flight crashed at Novaya Inya, Russia on 1 December 2001, after a reported wing fire. All 18 aboard perished.

== Aircraft ==
The aircraft was an Ilyushin Il-76TD operated by the Border Guard Service of Russia for the Armed Forces of the Russian Federation that had been operated by Aeroflot to carry cargo. The aircraft's registration number was RA-76839.

== Crash ==
As Flight 9064 was at 29,000 feet, a small fire started on the right wing of the aircraft. The flight crew declared intentions to perform an emergency landing. As the pilots tried to land, though, the fire grew worse. The plane descended rapidly and ended up hitting trees, causing it to break into multiple pieces as it crashed. The accident killed all 18 passengers and crew.
