= Yerevan-Avia =

Armenian cargo airline

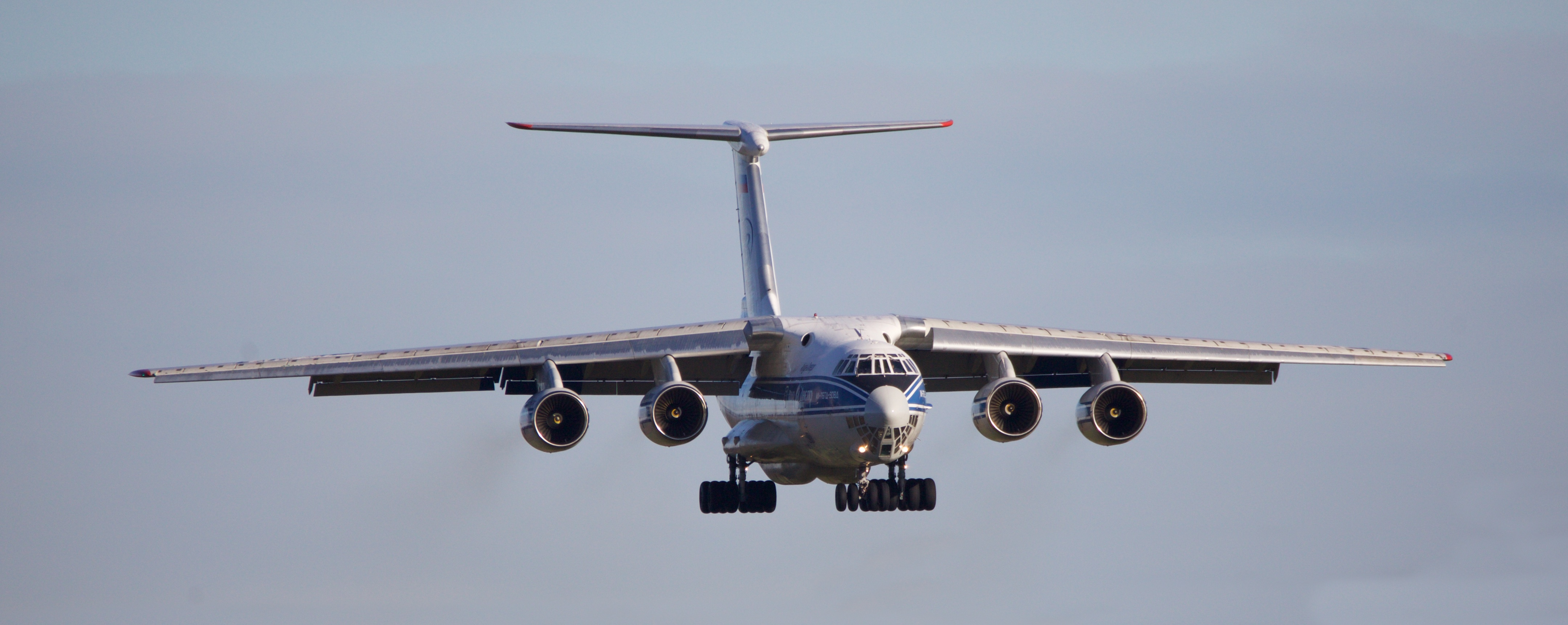
- Ilyushin Il-76
IATA	ICAO	Call sign
-	ERV	YEREVAN-AVIA
- Founded: 1992
- Ceased operations: 2009
- Hubs: Zvartnots Int'l Airport
- Fleet size: 2
- Destinations: 35
- Headquarters: Yerevan, Armenia
- Key people: Hambartsum Galstyan, co-founder Arsen Aslanian (Director); Jivan Movsisian (Head of International department); Karen Gabrielyan (Representative in USA and Canada); Ara Ohanjanian (Representative in Europe); Vladimir Kasparov (Representative in Russia and CIS countries)
- Website: http://www.yer-avia.am/

Yerevan-Avia, also known as "Yer-Avia", was a privately owned airline operating international cargo flights from Yerevan Zvartnots International Airport, Armenia. Yerevan-Avia seemed no longer active after February 2010.

== History ==
Yerevan-Avia was established in 1992 under the initiative and direct participation of the Mayor of Yerevan, Mr. Hambartsum Galstyan. It became the first freighter airline in Armenia equipped with privately owned aircraft. From its inception, the company managed to prepare highly qualified flight crews in a short period of time, as well as technical and engineering ground personnel trained entirely by recognized training institutions. The majority of the necessary aircraft maintenance was being performed at the home base.

== Destinations ==
Yerevan-Avia started off with flights to CIS countries, and later on, was extended to France, Germany, Bulgaria, Italy, the Netherlands, Belgium, China, India, Zaire, Congo, Kenya, Egypt, and Australia. Its aircraft visited more than 35 countries. The company had guaranteed cargo traffic, mainly from the United Arab Emirates to CIS countries: Russia (mainly Moscow), Moldova, Georgia, Tajikistan, among others. They also sometimes flew to Europe (Germany and the Netherlands) and to Africa.

== Fleet ==
Yerevan-Avia fleet included:

- 1 Ilyushin Il-76
