= Ilavia =

IATA	ICAO	Call sign
—	ILV	Ilavia
- Founded: 1994
- Ceased operations: 2005
- Headquarters: Moscow, Russia
- Key people: Vladimir Mavrodi

Ilavia was an airline based in Moscow, Russia, which operated chartered flight services within Russia and to other CIS destinations.

== History ==
The airline was founded in 1994, originally to deliver food and materials to remote Russian towns. It was owned by Aerotrans Airlines (90 percent), with the remaining shares being held by the Ilyushin Aviation Complex. On 15 March 2005, Ilavia had its airline licence withdrawn.

== Fleet ==
The Ilavia fleet consisted of the following aircraft (at January 2005):

- 2 Ilyushin Il-76MD
- 4 Ilyushin Il-76TD
