= Krylo Airlines =

Russian airline

IATA	ICAO	Call sign
K9	KRI	Krylo
- Founded: December 1990
- Commenced operations: January 1991
- Ceased operations: 2003
- Fleet size: See Fleet
- Headquarters: Moscow, Russia

Krylo Airlines was an airline based in Moscow, Russia, which operated regional passenger services and freight charters between 1990 and 2003.

== Code data ==
- IATA Code: K9
- ICAO Code: KRI
- Callsign: Krylo

== History ==
The airline was established in December 1990 and started operations in January 1991. It started international charter services as a means of earning revenue following a fall in state funding.

== Fleet ==
Upon closure, the Krylo Airlines fleet included one Antonov An-26
