= Kosmas Air =

Cargo charter airline based in Belgrade, Serbia

IATA	ICAO	Call sign
N/A	KMG	KOSMAS CARGO
- Founded: 2004
- Ceased operations: 2008
- Hubs: Belgrade Nikola Tesla International Airport
- Fleet size: 1
- Destinations: Unscheduled charters
- Headquarters: Belgrade, Serbia
- Key people: Vladimir A. Sokolov
- Website: kosmasair.co.rs

Kosmas Air was a charter cargo airline based in Belgrade, Serbia. The airline's main field of activity covered air freight and transport of humanitarian aid relief from Europe to Asia and Africa.

== History ==
Kosmas Air was the first Cargo Air Operator in Serbia with its home base in Belgrade. AOC for charter cargo worldwide was issued in May 2004. First services commenced with an Ilyushin Il-76TD with the registration YU-AMI in July 2004. AOC was revoked by CAD of Serbia in May 2008.

== Destinations ==
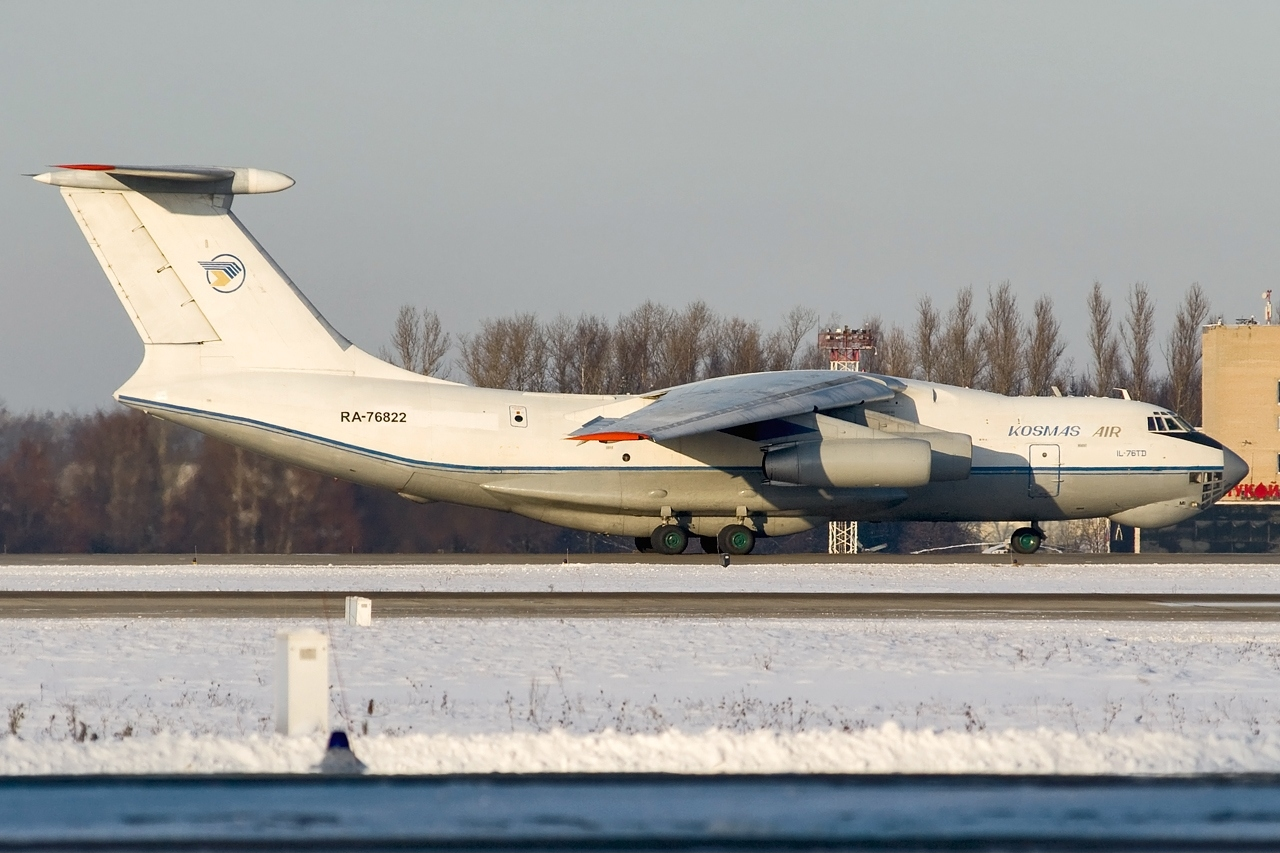
Kosmas Air Il-76 at Moscow Sheremetyevo Airport in 2009.

The airline operated out of Austria, Czech Republic, Denmark, Estonia, Netherlands, Spain, Switzerland carrying humanitarian and relief cargo to Tsunami areas (Sri Lanka, Banda Aceh, Medan, Kuala Lumpur) in January 2005.

== Fleet ==
Kosmas Air operated the following aircraft:

- 1 Ilyushin Il-76 TD cargo aircraft
