= Lviv Airlines =

Ukrainian airline

IATA	ICAO	Call sign
5V	UKW	UKRAINE WEST
- Founded: 1992
- Ceased operations: Unknown (Stored Aircraft)
- Hubs: Lviv International Airport
- Focus cities: Lviv
- Fleet size: 1
- Destinations: 0
- Headquarters: Lviv International Airport; Lviv, Ukraine

Lviv Airlines (Ukrainian: Львівські авіалінії) was an airline headquartered on the grounds of Lviv International Airport in Lviv, Ukraine. It operates (operated?) chartered passenger and cargo services out of Lviv International Airport.

== History ==
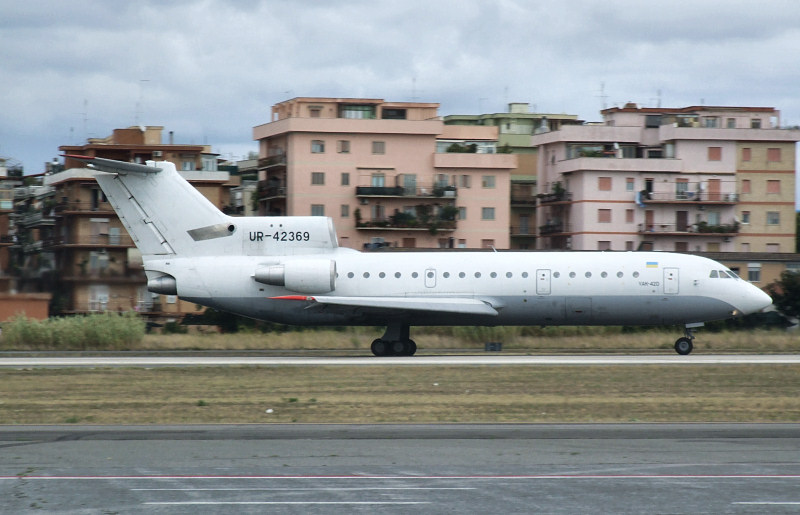
Yakovlev Yak-42D of Lviv Airlines.

The airline was established by Air Ukraine in 1992 from the Lviv Division of the Aeroflot Ukraine Directorate. As of March 2007, it had 446 employees. Since 2009, there are no scheduled services. Its only remaining aircraft is used for charter flights, mostly on behalf of Aerosvit Airlines and Donbassaero.

== Fleet ==
The Lviv Airlines fleet included the following aircraft (at September 2009):

- 3 Yakovlev Yak-42s
