= Dnipro (disambiguation) =

Dnipro (Ukrainian: Дніпро) is a city in Ukraine, and an alternate name for the river Dnieper.

Dnipro may also refer to:

== Places ==
- Dnipro Valley, the river valley of the Dnipro
- Dnipro Raion, Dnipro Oblast, Ukraine; a district
- Dnipro Raion, Kyiv, Ukraine; an urban district
- Dnipro Oblast, a province of Ukraine

=== Facilities and structures ===
- Dnipro International Airport, Dnipro, Ukraine
- Dnipro railway station, Dnipro, Ukraine
- Dnipro (Kyiv Metro), a station on the Kyiv Metro
- Dnipro-Arena, a soccer stadium in Dnipro, Ukraine
- Dnipro Polytechnic, Dnipro, Ukraine
- Dnipro Hydroelectric Station, Zaporizhzhia, Ukraine; a hydroelectric station and dam
- Hotel Dnipro, a hotel in Kyiv, Ukraine

== Sport ==
- Dnipro (bandy), a Ukrainian bandy club based in Dnipro
- FC Dnipro, a former Ukrainian professional football club dissolved in 2019
- FC Dnipro-2 Dnipropetrovsk
- FC Dnipro-3 Dnipropetrovsk
- FC Dnipro-75 Dnipropetrovsk
- SC Dnipro-1, a former Ukrainian professional football club dissolved in 2024
- BC Dnipro, a Ukrainian basketball club based in Dnipro
- FC Dnipro Cherkasy, a former Ukrainian professional football club from Cherkasy
  - FC Cherkaskyi Dnipro, now FC Cherkashchyna

== Military ==
- Dnipro (surface-to-air missile), a Ukrainian missile
- Dnipro-1 Regiment, a police regiment of Ukraine
- 39th Territorial Defence Battalion 'Dnipro-2' (Ukraine), a Ukrainian army battalion

== Other uses ==
- Dnipro (magazine), a Ukrainian monthly magazine
- Dniproavia, former airline

== See also ==
- Dnipro barbel, a fish
- Dnipro-Donets culture, a prehistoric people
- Dnipro Institute of Infrastructure and Transport, a part of public university in Ukraine
- Oles Honchar Dnipro National University
- Dniprovskyi District (disambiguation)
- Dnipro Dnipropetrovsk (disambiguation)
- Dnipropetrovsk (disambiguation)
- Dnieper (disambiguation)
- Dnepr (disambiguation)
