= Ukrainian Aviation Group =

- Launch date: 2007
- Full members: 3
- Management: Ihor Kolomoyskyi

The Ukrainian Aviation Group was a Ukrainian informal monopoly alliance of three airlines owned by Privat Group and led by Ihor Kolomoyskyi. The group was founded in 2007 by combining Dniproavia, Aerosvit and Donbassaero; these airlines often provide each other with the opportunity to use each other's aircraft, with flights more than often being operated for Aerosvit (the alliance's largest carrier). When Privat Group acquired Ukraine's largest airline, Ukraine International Airlines, in February 2011, Privat Group had a near monopoly on the aviation business in Ukraine.

The three companies of Ukrainian Aviation Group, together with sister Windrose Airlines, were experiencing major debt troubles in late 2012, as Privat Group was shifting its focus on larger and more profitable Ukraine International Airlines. In January 2013, Aerosvit and Donbassaero ceased operations due to being bankrupt; while a much smaller Dniproavia emerged from bankruptcy and continued limited operation until the end of 2017.

== Dissolution and Final Fate of the Monopoly (2018–2024) ==
Following the cessation of Dniproavia’s operations at the end of 2017, the original Ukrainian Aviation Group was formally dissolved. However, Privat Group’s influence on Ukrainian aviation continued through Ukraine International Airlines (UIA), which remained the country's flag carrier, though it reported significant financial losses in the subsequent years.

The ultimate end of this dominance came with a series of external and internal events:

1. UIA’s operations were severely impacted by the tragic downing of UIA Flight 752 in Tehran in January 2020.
2. All commercial flights in Ukraine, including UIA’s, were suspended in February 2022 due to the Russian invasion.
3. Ukraine International Airlines ultimately ceased operations and entered bankruptcy administration in 2023.
4. The group's leader, Ihor Kolomoyskyi, faced various high-profile legal issues and arrests concerning his assets in 2023, confirming the complete end of his and Privat Group's influence on the country's airline sector.
