= Dnipropetrovsk (disambiguation) =

Dnipropetrovsk is the Soviet-era name of the city Dnipro in Ukraine, it may refer to:

- Dnipro (Ukrainian: Дніпро, formerly Dnipropetrovsk), Dnipro Raion, Dnipropetrovsk Oblast, Ukraine; the city and administrative centre
- Dnipro Raion (Ukrainian: Дніпровський район, formerly Dnipropetrovsk Raion), Dnipropetrovsk Oblast, Ukraine; a district
- Dnipropetrovsk Oblast (Ukrainian: Дніпропетровська область), Ukraine; a province
- Dnipro International Airport, (formerly Dnipropetrovsk International Airport), Ukraine
- Ukrainian frigate Dnipropetrovsk

== See also ==
- Dniprovskyi District, Kyiv, Ukraine
- Dnipropetrovsk Mafia, a group of Soviet politicians
- Dniprovskyi District (disambiguation)
- Dnipro Dnipropetrovsk (disambiguation)
- Dnipro (disambiguation)
