= Aerosvit Ukrainian Airlines =

Ukrainian private airline

IATA	ICAO	Call sign
VV	AEW	AEROSVIT
- Founded: 25 March 1994
- Commenced operations: April 1994
- Ceased operations: February 2013
- Hubs: Boryspil International Airport
- Focus cities: Dnipropetrovsk International Airport; Donetsk International Airport; Odesa International Airport; Simferopol International Airport
- Frequent-flyer program: Meridian loyalty program
- Alliance: Ukrainian Aviation Group
- Subsidiaries: Dniproavia; Donbassaero
- Fleet size: 4
- Parent company: Privat Group
- Headquarters: Boryspil International Airport, Kyiv, Ukraine
- Key people: Oleksandr Avdieiev (Acting Director General); Gregory Gurtovoy (Co-Chairman of Supervisory Board)
- Website: aerosvit.com (archived)

AeroSvit Airlines private stock company (Ukrainian: Приватне акціонерне товариство «Авіакомпанія АероСвіт»), operating as AeroSvit — Ukrainian Airlines / АероСвіт, was a Ukrainian private airline. Its head office was on the grounds of the Boryspil International Airport in Boryspil.

Aerosvit Ukrainian Airlines was a member of IATA and an IATA IOSA certified carrier. Its main base was Boryspil Airport. The airline was established in March 1994 and started operations in April of the same year with international flights from Kyiv in co-operation with Air Ukraine. At December 2012, Aerosvit was the largest carrier in Ukraine. Bankruptcy procedures began on 4 January 2013, and in February 2013, AeroSvit ceased operations.

== History ==
=== Early years ===
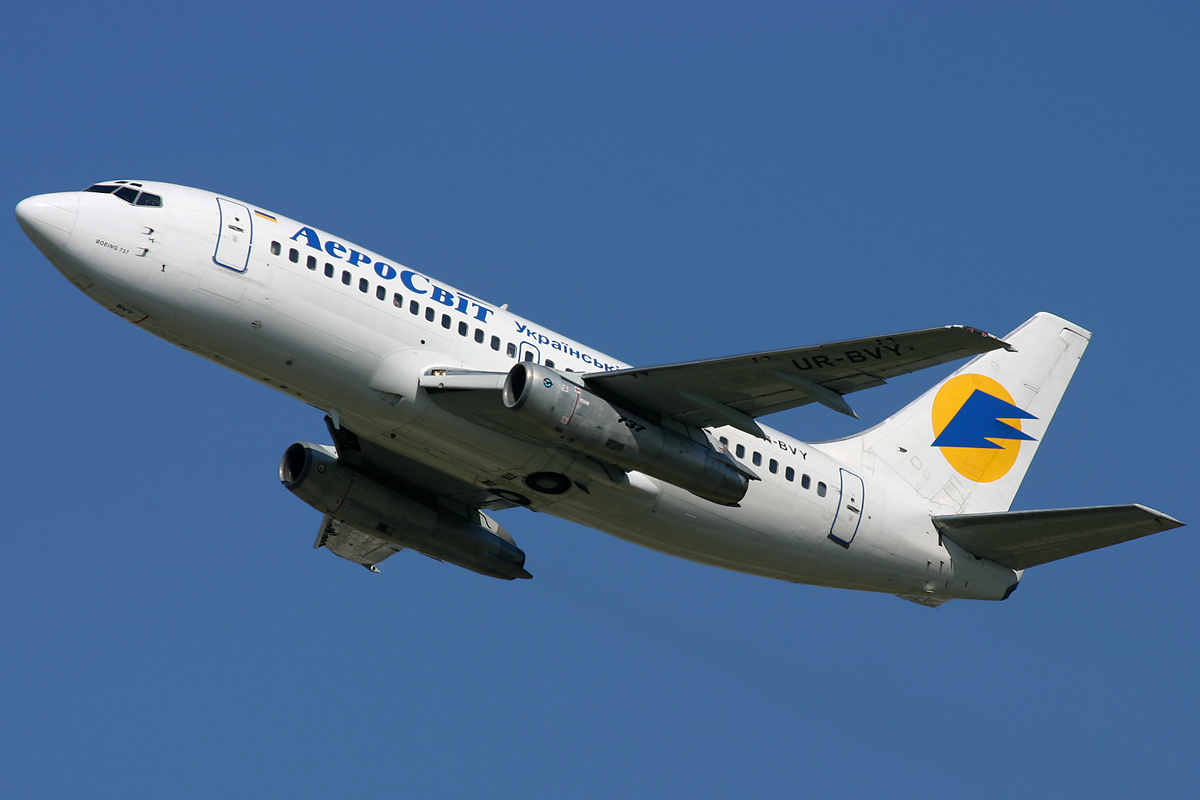
One of Aerosvit's original Boeing 737-200 aircraft departs Boryspil International Airport in 2008.

The airline was established on 25 March 1994, and started operations in April that year with flights from Kyiv to Athens, Larnaca, Tel Aviv, Odesa and Thessaloniki in co-operation with Air Ukraine. In October of the same year, the carrier started dry-leasing some Boeing 737-200s in connection with the addition of Moscow into the route network. In 1995, new scheduled flights from Kyiv to Almaty, Ashgabad, and Riga were launched, laying the foundations for it to become a transit airline. In 1996, Yekaterinburg, Kharkiv, Lviv, and Simferopol were added to the airline's network. Also in 1996, the airline became a member of the International Air Transport Association (IATA). By 1997, Aerosvit Airlines had become a member of IATA Clearing House and purchased its first Boeing 737-200 aircraft. By 1999, Aerosvit had acquired a third Boeing 737-200 aircraft and scheduled flights to Budapest, Sofia and Istanbul were launched.

=== Post-millennium expansion and reorganisation ===
In 2000, two more Boeing 737-300 aircraft joined Aerosvit Airlines' fleet. Scheduled flights to Prague and Warsaw were launched, and Aerosvit Airlines carried more passengers than any other Ukrainian airline (over the calendar year). In 2002, a further three Boeing 737-500 aircraft joined the fleet, as did the first Boeing 767-300ER — a 350-seater aircraft that previously belonged to SAS — on a long-term lease from Boeing Capital, aimed at starting operations to Bangkok. Also in 2002, Aerosvit started flying to Dubai; it also took over the long-haul services previously operated by Air Ukraine.

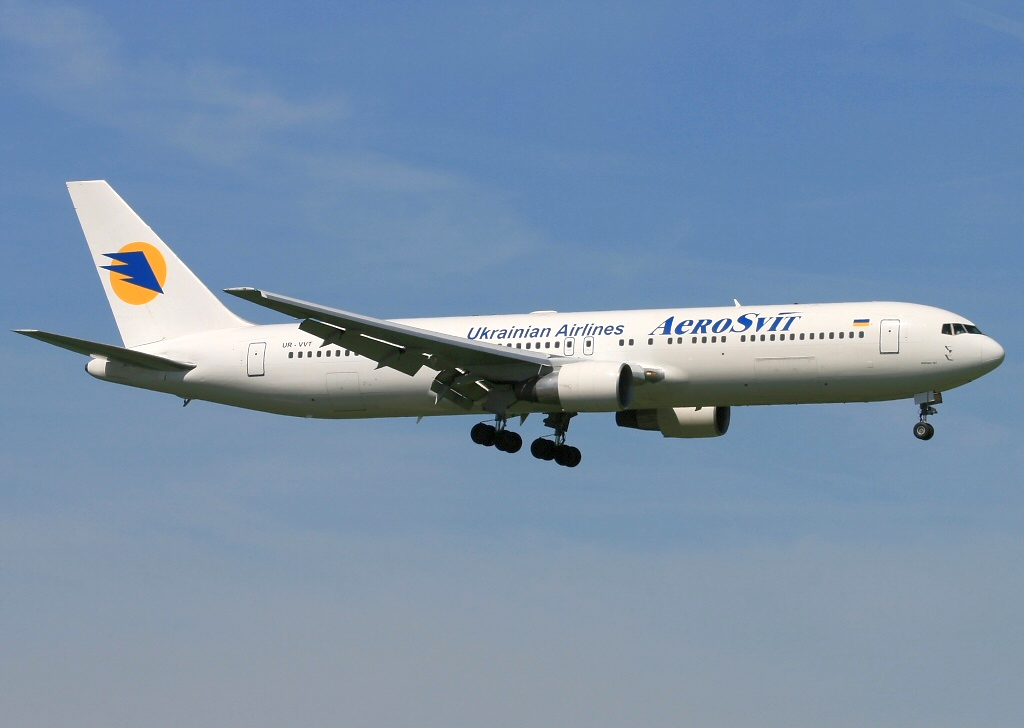
Aerosvit Boeing 767-300ER is seen here on short final to Prague Ruzyne Airport in 2009. The first aircraft of the type entered the fleet in 2002, and was first depoloyed on a revenue service to Bangkok.

The Kyiv–New York–Kyiv route was launched in 2003 with a twice weekly service. Later that year, flights to Toronto and Delhi began. In this year, the airline also carried its second millionth passenger. Soon after, the company received the JAR-145 certification for performing in house maintenance works in accordance with the European Joint Aviation Authorities' requirements. With the onset of 2004, Aerosvit increased the number of weekly flights it operated to Bangkok to three and an additional Boeing 737-300 was added to the fleet. Route expansion continued as before, and over the course of the year the number of Aerosvit-operated domestic flights across Ukraine expanded to eleven destinations. However, expansion did not just take place on the domestic market, as Aerosvit introduced new routes from its base in Kyiv, to Beijing, Baku, Chisinau, Cairo, and St. Petersburg. Finally, in 2004, Aerosvit Ukrainian Airlines became the official air carrier of the National Olympic team of Ukraine for the XXVIII Olympic Summer Games held in 2004 in Athens.

Aerosvit's ninth Boeing 737 mid-haul aircraft started operating in 2005, with a tenth being added to the fleet soon after. In the same year, e-ticketing was launched on the route New York-Kyiv and Aerosvit Ukrainian Airlines and Azerbaijan Airlines started code-sharing on the Kyiv-Baku route.

In 2006, the carrier became the 85th worldwide in passing the IATA Operational Safety Audit. In March that year, Naples was added to the route network, and in June, the Kyiv–Vilnius and Simferopol–Vilnius routes were launched in codeshare agreement with Lithuania's national carrier flyLAL. In September 2006, Aerosvit was the first airline to operate both inbound and outbound passenger flights at Bangkok Suvarnabhumi Airport, and in October, the airline celebrated the six-millionth passenger carried since it started operations.

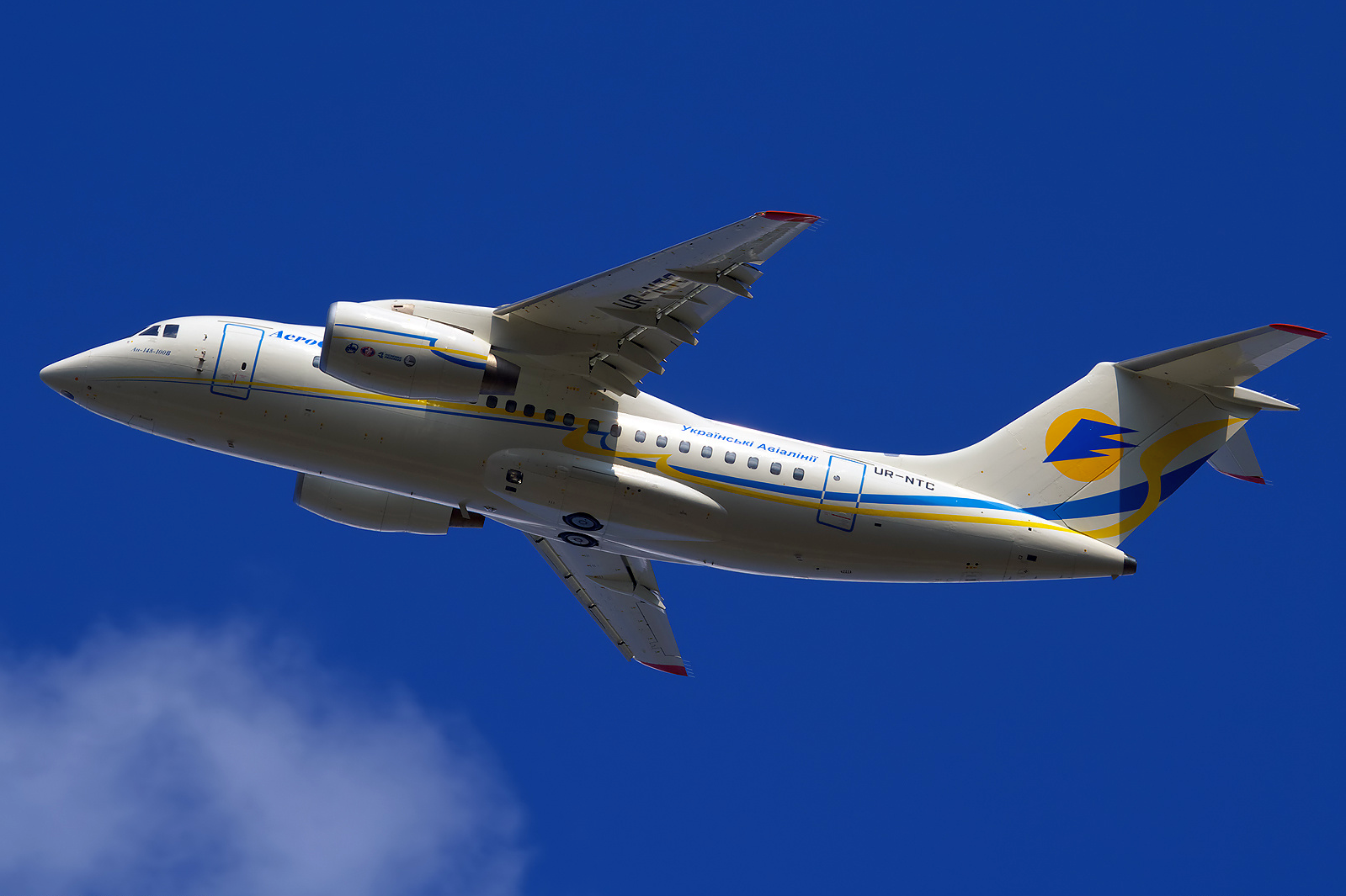
An Antonov An-148-100B departing from Hostomel Airport in 2010. The carrier started flying the type on domestic routes in June 2009.

In 2007, thanks to cooperation with Delta Air Lines, the number of destinations in the United States increased, allowing onward travel from New York to cities such as Los Angeles and Portland. It was in the same year that Aerosvit Ukrainian Airlines and Donbassaero began to build (at the initiative of their joint main shareholder Privat Group) the strategic alliance Ukrainian Aviation Group. Also, that year, the fleet was supplemented with a third Boeing 767 long-haul aircraft and the eleventh and twelfth mid-range Boeing 737s, whilst the start of code share flights with Belavia on the Kyiv-Minsk route took place. In August 2007, it was announced that a contract was signed with Boeing for the acquisition of seven Boeing 737-800s and purchase rights for another seven; in a deal valued at more than US$500 million, the operation marked the company's first direct purchase of aircraft since its foundation. These new aircraft would replace the airline's 13-strong Boeing 737 Classic fleet; the first of them was handed over by the manufacturer in March 2012. In December 2007, the airline began the commercialisation of e-tickets on its website.

At the beginning of 2008, flights from Kyiv to Tbilisi and Almaty were launched by Aerosvit, E-ticketing was introduced on all Aerosvit scheduled flights, and Aerosvit Airlines again became the official air carrier of the Ukrainian National Olympic team for the XXIX Olympic Games held in Beijing. In March 2009, Aerosvit acquired a 70-seater Antonov An-148, which was deployed on domestic routes in June; the first international revenue flight for the type with the airline took place in December that year, covering the Odesa–Moscow route. Also in April 2009, the carrier launched scheduled flights to Astana and Riga.

=== The Ukrainian Aviation Group and modern era ===
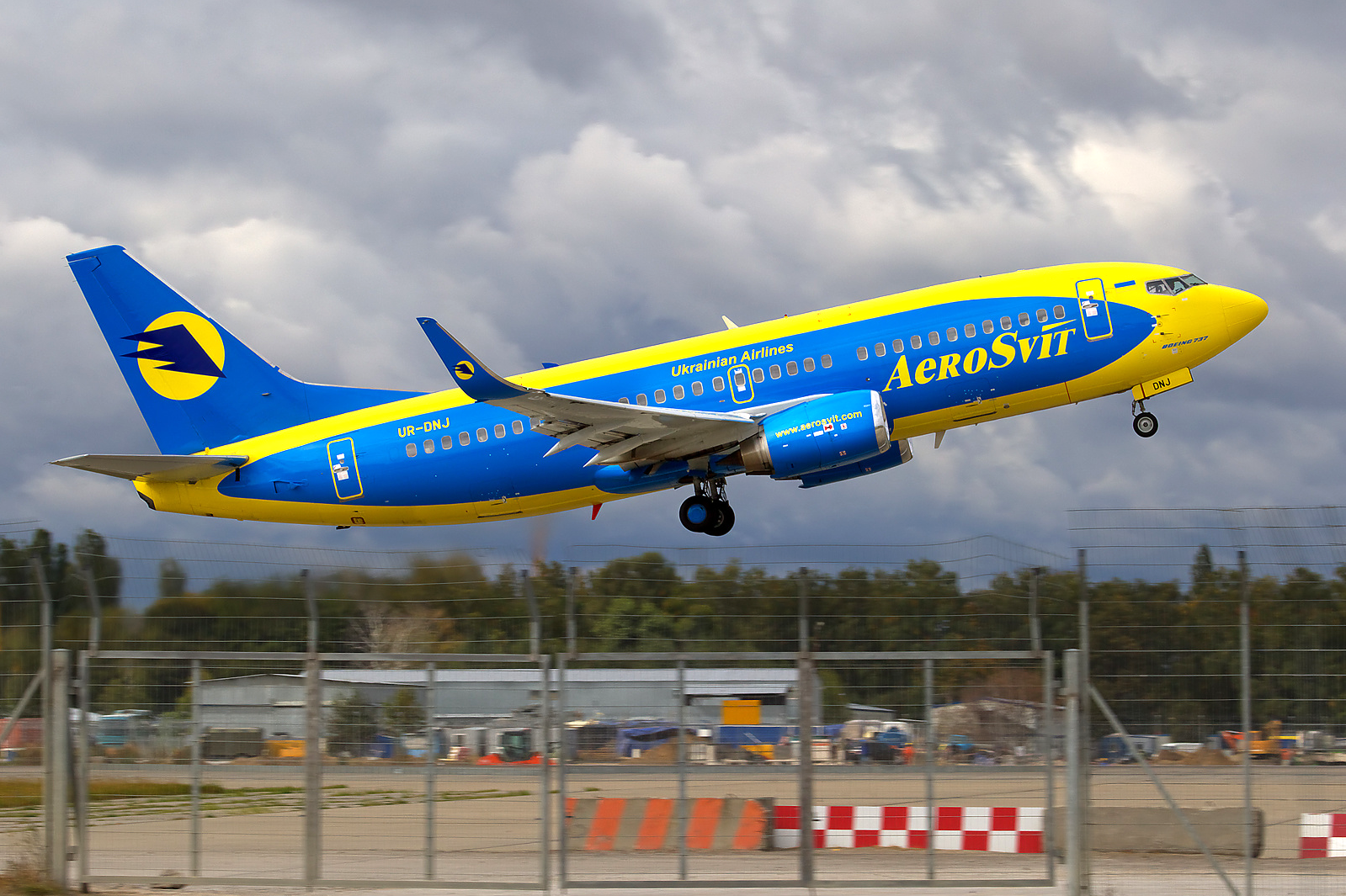
In 2011, Aerosvit adopted the new, standard Ukrainian Aviation Group livery. An Aerosvit Boeing 737-300 wearing this livery takes-off from Boryspil International Airport in 2011.

In 2010, Aerosvit added a second Antonov 148 aircraft to its fleet and new routes including Odesa-Kaliningrad, Simferopol-Kaliningrad, Donetsk-Saint Petersburg, Odesa-Riga, and Dnipro-Berlin were opened (largely with the cooperation of its sister companies Dniproavia and Donbassaero). An Odesa-Milan code-share route was launched. Dniproavia, having come into the Privat Group's business portfolio, joined the Ukrainian Aviation Group.

During 2010, the airline opened 21 new international routes, including Bucharest and Yerevan, and signed a codeshare agreement with Hainan Airlines that covered operations on the Kyiv–Beijing route. Ho Chi Minh City was added to the route network in December 2011, becoming the first direct air link between Ukraine and Vietnam. Aerosvit took delivery of its first Boeing 737-800 in March 2012.

Additionally, Aerosvit signed a contract with Boeing for delivery of 4 Boeing 737-900ER aircraft in 2013-2014, and a fourth Boeing 767 was added to the fleet. In the first quarter of 2012, the airline received the first of its ordered Embraer E190 aircraft, with deliveries continuing into 2013 or 2014.

As of 25 March 2012, as a result of the Anti-monopoly committee of Ukraine's decision to allow the consolidation of the Ukrainian Aviation Group's physical and operational assets, Donbassaero and Dniproavia no longer operate flights with their own codes, but rather on behalf of their parent company Aerosvit.

By June 2012, the airline introduced their first Embraer E190. All Embraer E190 were ordered and operated by the partner-airline Dniproavia.

=== Financial difficulties and downfall ===
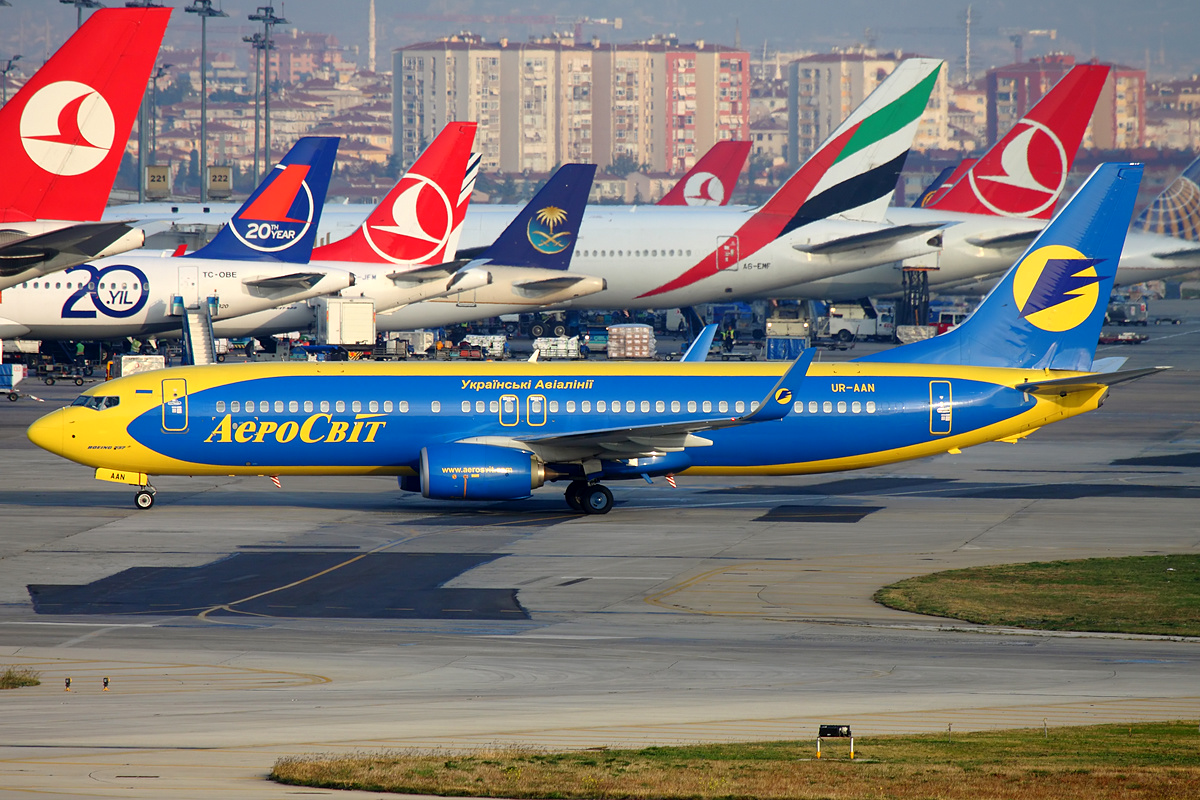
AeroSvit Boeing 737-800 at Atatürk International Airport in 2012. The first aircraft of the type was delivered to the carrier in March that year. As of January 2013, all Boeing 737s in the fleet were being returned to the lessors.

Boryspil International Airport's suspension of Aerosvit flights in March 2012, and a clash over a RUB 95 million debt with Sheremetyevo International Airport late that year indicated Aerosvit's financial weakness. As of 27 December 2012, debt was US$534 million (around €403 million), thrice the value of company assets (€138.7 million, as of 30 December 2012). The airline had not reported the 2012 results, but losses mounted to ₴ 1,456 billion in 2011, a threefold increase year-on-year. Aerosvit's last profitable year was 2007.

On 29 December 2012, Aerosvit filed for bankruptcy but intended to restructure and continue to operate. Large minority shareholders claimed they were not informed about the filing. Days prior to initiating the legal procedure, Aerosvit disclosed plans to transfer a number of its international routes to Ukraine International Airlines. After the bankruptcy proceedings were announced, the carrier's aircraft were detained at various airports, leaving hundreds of passengers stranded. In mid-January 2013, Rosaviatsiya stated that it would ban the airline over a US$1.5 million debt; late that month, Russia barred the airline from operating in its territory. As of 31 January 2013, the company stated that all the Boeing 737s were being returned to the lessors, as well as one Boeing 767. It was disclosed in mid-February 2013 that the company planned to cut about 1,800 jobs by March 2013, including all the Boeing 737-related staff that had already been dismissed.

Despite indications in mid-January that Aerosvit would continue to fly between Kyiv and Bangkok, Beijing, Dnipro, Ivano-Frankivsk and New York, the suspension of medium- and short-haul routes was announced, with plans to reestablish services to Bangkok, Beijing and New York in April 2013; however, as of April 2013, the airline ceased long-haul services as well. Part of Aerosvit's fleet was transferred to Ukraine International Airlines.

== Destinations ==
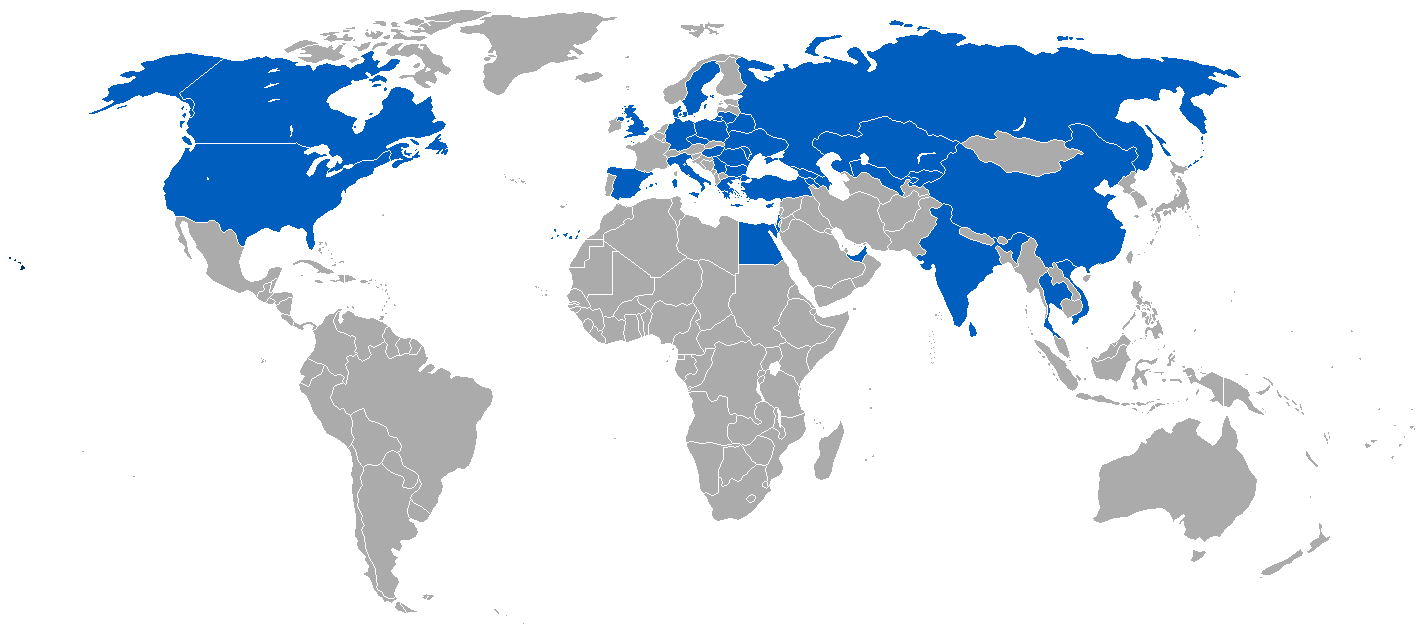
Aerosvit Airlines' destinations former destinations

=== Codeshare agreements ===
Aerosvit codeshared with the following airlines (as of December 2012):

- Aeroflot (SkyTeam)
- airBaltic
- Armavia
- Belavia
- Bulgaria Air
- Dniproavia (Ukrainian Aviation Group)
- El Al
- Estonian Air
- Somon Air
- Hainan Airlines
- LOT (Star Alliance)
- Rossiya
- Ural Airlines
- UTair
- Thai Airways International (Star Alliance)
- Vietnam Airlines (SkyTeam)
- Turkish Airlines (Star Alliance)
- Ukraine International Airlines
- Hamburg Airways

== Fleet ==
Last fleet of Aerosvit Ukrainian Airlines

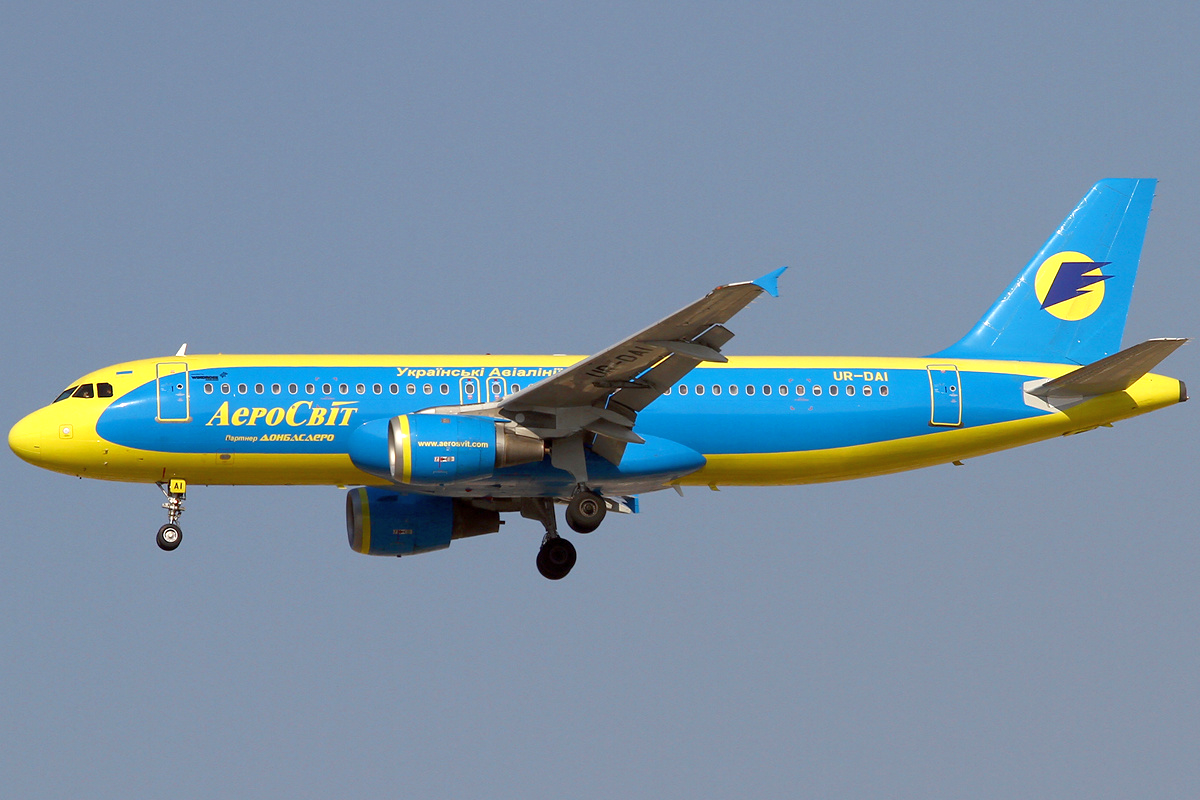
An Airbus A320 on short final to Dubai International Airport in 2013.

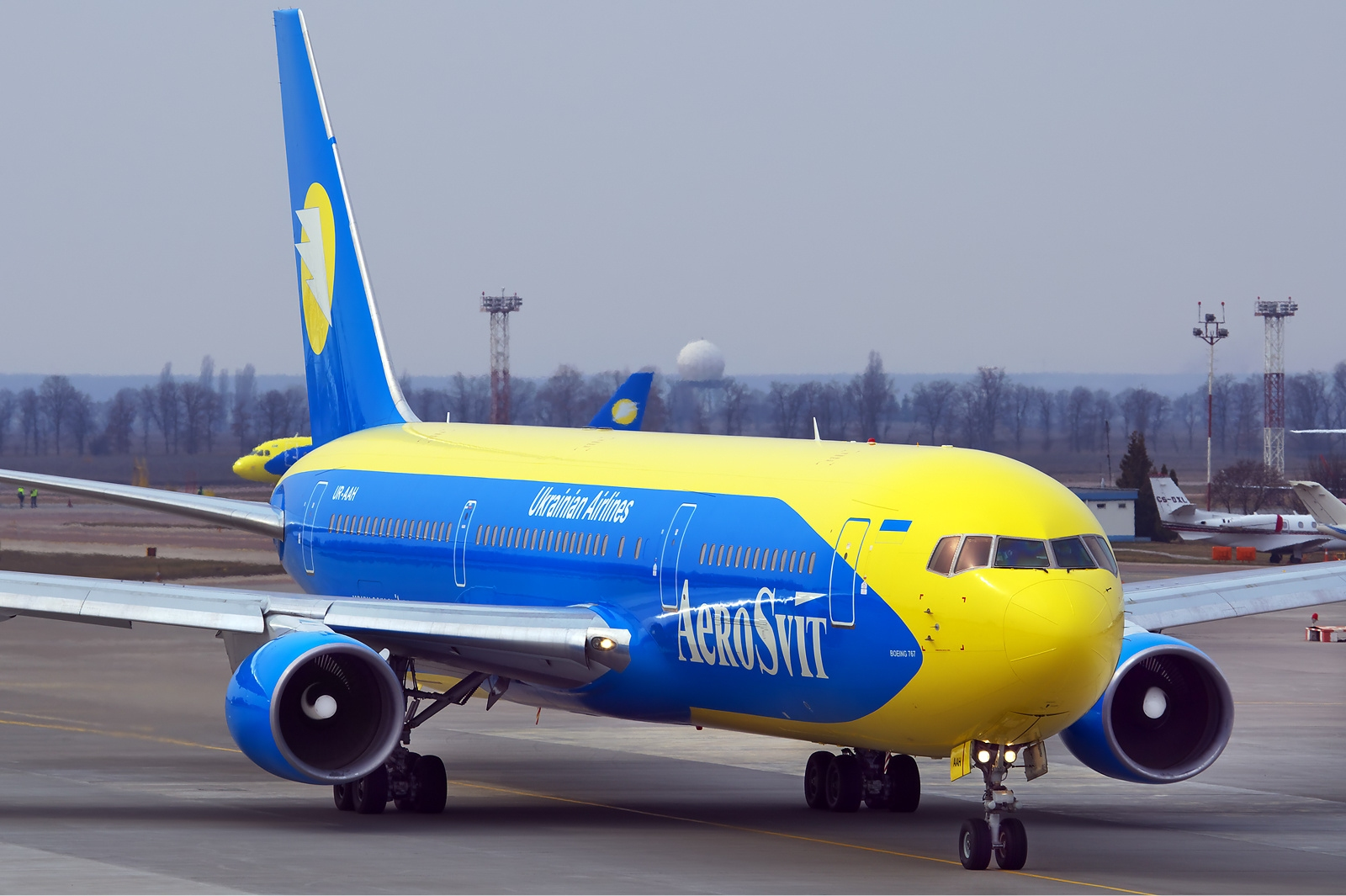
Aerosvit Boeing 767 at Kyiv's Boryspil International Airport (2011)

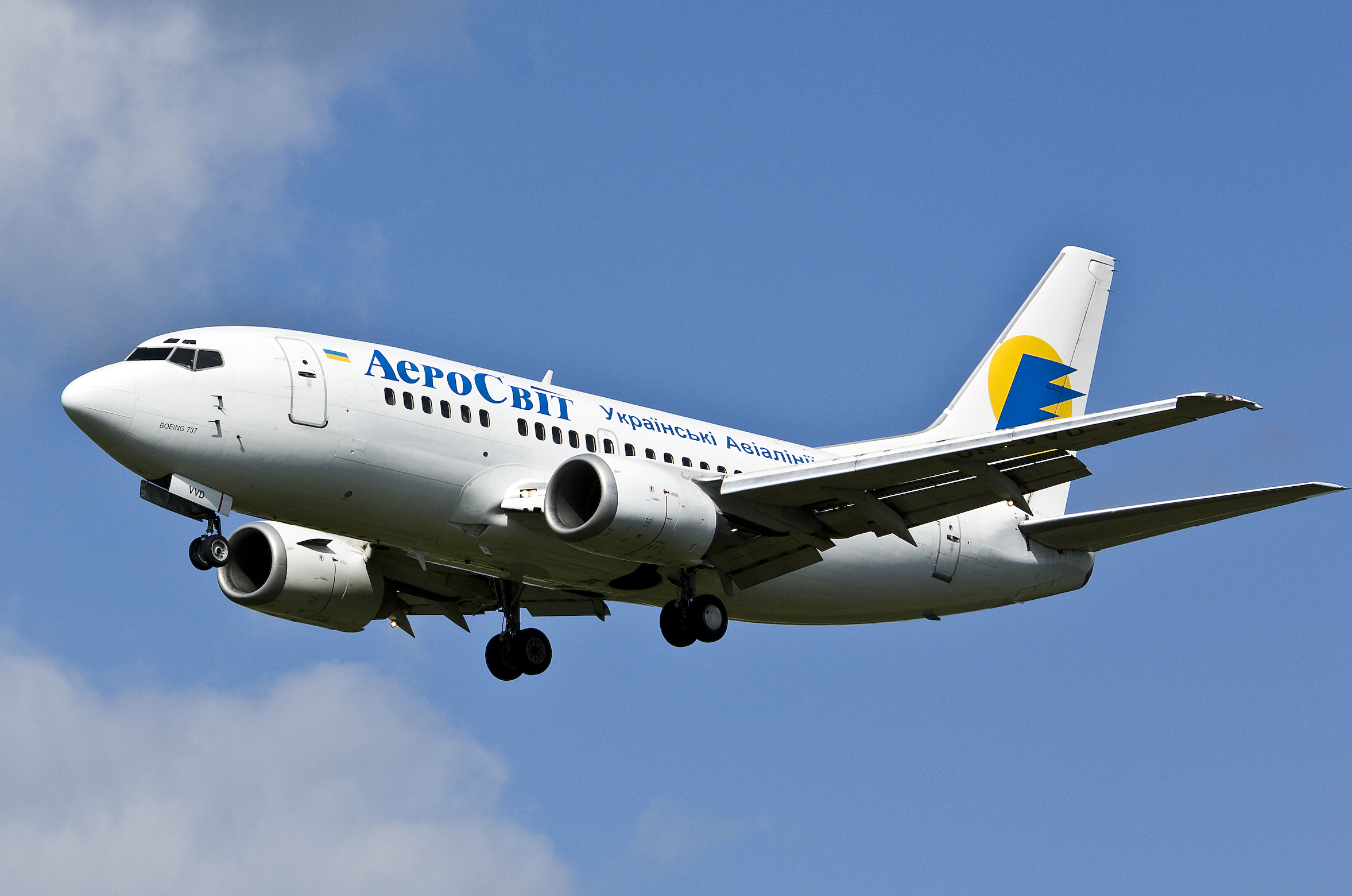
A Boeing 737 in Aerosvit's older livery (2011)

At June 2013, Aerosvit Airlines had no active aircraft in its fleet. The airline operated the following aircraft throughout its history:

- Airbus A320-200
- Antonov An-148
- Antonov An-24RV
- Antonov An-24B
- ATR 72-200
- Embraer 190
- Boeing 737-200
- Boeing 737-300
- Boeing 737-400
- Boeing 737-500
- Boeing 737-700
- Boeing 737-800
- Boeing 767-300ER
- Tupolev Tu-134

=== Domestic flights ===
Since 2002, AeroSvit Airlines executed the social priority program of domestic, intra-Ukrainian air carriage, operating scheduled flights that connect Dnipro, Odesa, and Simferopol with the capital of Ukraine. In 2003-2004, AeroSvit Airlines' domestic network expanded to Donetsk, Kharkiv, Lviv, and Ivano-Frankivsk. With the domestic flights program, flight safety, high regularity of flights, and a high level of service all became priority areas. Special standards of domestic flights were developed, such as making special menus available on all flights. In 2004, establishment of close cooperation with other Ukrainian airlines supplemented AeroSvit Airlines' own route network with such destinations as Uzhhorod, Chernivtsi, Luhansk, and Zaporizhzhia.

AeroSvit and its Ukrainian Aviation Group partners flew to the Ukrainian cities of Donetsk, Odesa, Simferopol, Dnipro, Kharkiv, Ivano-Frankivsk, Uzhgorod, Chernivtsi, Luhansk, and Sevastopol.

=== Non-scheduled (charter) flights ===
Another area of focus for AeroSvit Airlines was non-scheduled or charter, air carriage. From 1994 to 2004, AeroSvit Airlines organized charter programs and performed single ad hoc flights for various customers.

Aerosvit's charter activities began with summer-only flights to the Greek island of Crete. Since 1998, AeroSvit Airlines had increased its charter flights offerings. In 1998, the first flights to Antalya (Turkey) began. In early 1999, AeroSvit Airlines opened a new charter route to Hurghada (Egypt). Since 1999, new charter flights to Bulgaria, Turkey, Egypt, Greece, Tunis, and other countries had been added.

AeroSvit Airlines increased its volume of charter air carriage considerably. In addition to flights to traditional summer resorts, AeroSvit Airlines flew to winter skiing resorts in Austria, France, Finland, Turkey, and Slovakia.

After AeroSvit Airlines added Boeing 767-300ERs to its fleet, charter flights to the Maldives, Tenerife, the Dominican Republic, Indonesia and other locales were added.

== Traffic and statistics ==
	2005	2006	2007	2008	2009	2010
Passenger load factor (%)	72,9	67,9	72,9	65,7	69,4	70,0
Total flight time (fh)	39151	49054	57977	70743	42199	63890
Revenue passenger km (mill)	3265,4	3561,8	4551,3	5304,6	3373,6	3966,6
Available seat km (mill)	4424, 7	5042,3	6230,9	7624,8	4857,2	5591,9
Revenue tones km (mill)	366,6	396,1	504,4	583,6	379,5	452,1
Total employees	1575	1944	2282	2352	1832	2072
RPK per employee (mill)	2,07	1,83	1,99	2,26	1,84	1,91

== Corporate affairs and identity ==
=== Subsidiaries ===
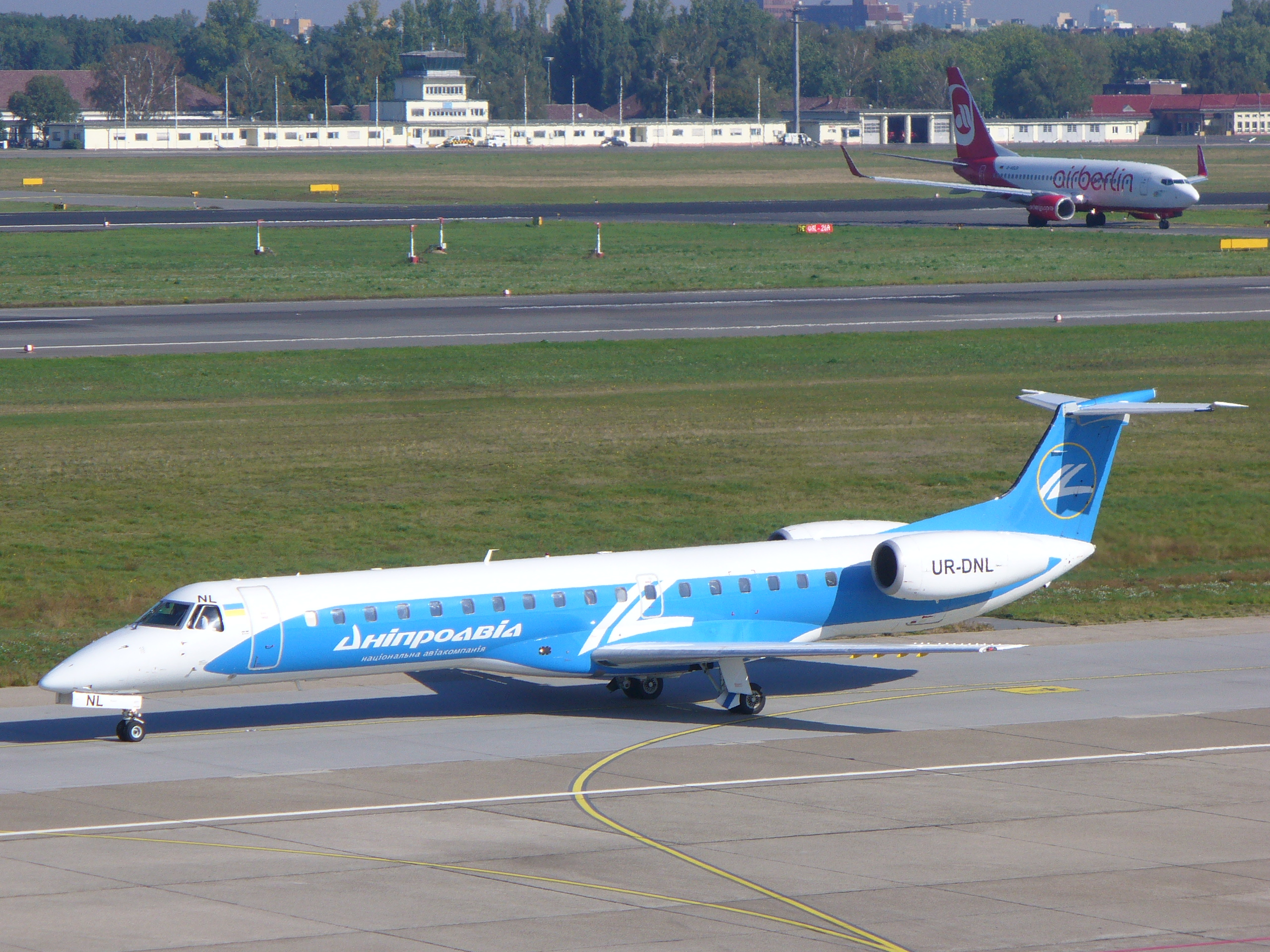
Dniprovavia Embraer ERJ-145 at Berlin-Tegel Airport (2010), featuring the common livery of the Ukrainian Aviation Group.

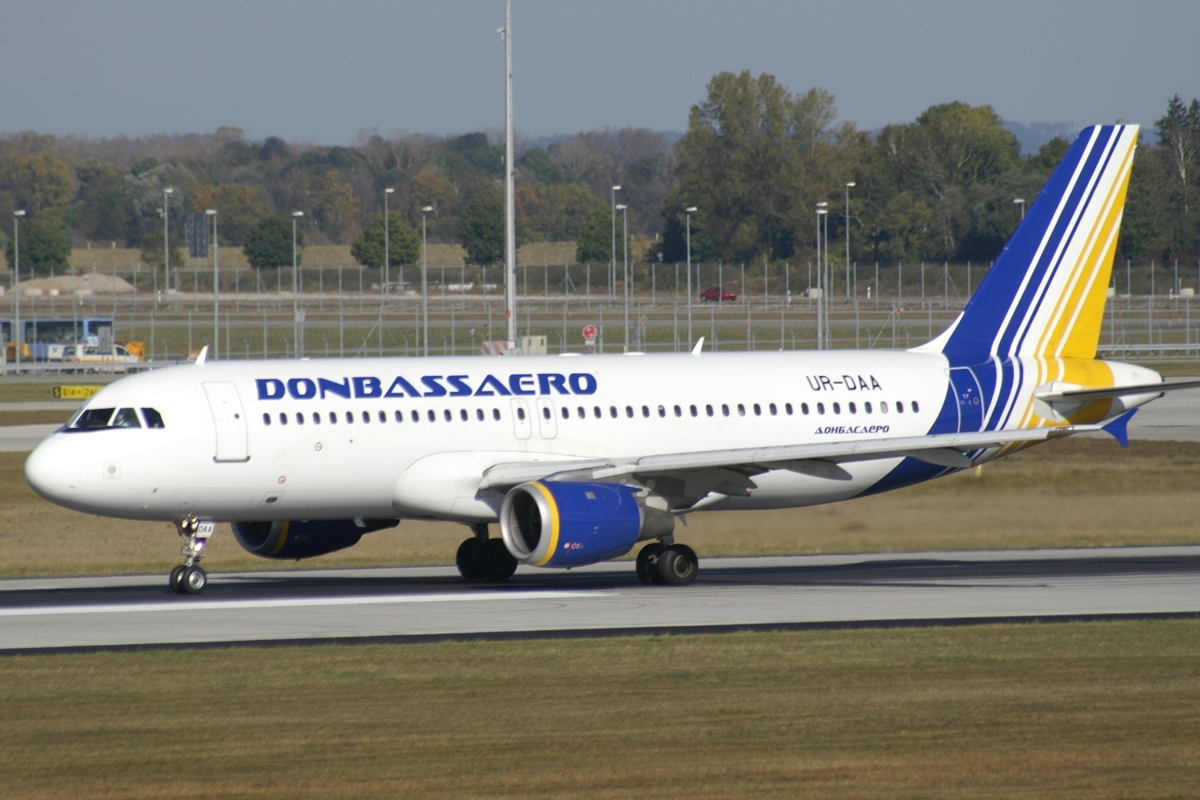
Donbassaero Airbus A320 in superseded livery at Munich Airport.

- Dniproavia, an airline headquartered in Dnipro, which participated in the Ukrainian Aviation Group and operated flights under Aerosvit's VV code.
- Donbassaero, was an airline headquartered in Donetsk, which participated in the Ukrainian Aviation Group and operated scheduled flights under Aerosvit's VV code.

=== Liveries and logo ===
Aerosvit's last livery was a Euro-white scheme, comprising a white fuselage with the blue Aerosvit title and design. The tail was white with a blue bird wing inside the yellow circle and the small Ukrainian flag at the top. The wing became a symbol of the company and inspired the name of Aerosvit Airlines. In 2011, a common Alliance livery was unveiled.

Logo image	Usage
	1994–1999
	1999–2003
	2003–2013

=== International cooperation ===
AeroSvit was a member of the following international organizations:

- International Air Transport Association (IATA), including BSP
- Association of European Airlines (AEA)
- European Business Association (EBA)
- U.S.-Ukraine Business Council (USUBC)
- International Chamber of Commerce in Ukraine (ICCU)
- Kyiv Chamber of Commerce and Industry
- Association of Ukrainian-Chinese Cooperation (AUCC)

== Incidents and accidents ==
On 17 December 1997, Aerosvit Flight 241, a Yakovlev Yak-42, crashed near Thessaloniki, Greece; all 62 passengers and 8 crew members died.

== See also ==
- List of airlines of Ukraine
- Transport in Ukraine
