= Dnepr =

Dnepr (Russian: Днепр) may refer to:

- Dnieper, a river flowing through Russia, Belarus and Ukraine to the Black Sea
- the Russian name for the city of Dnipro, Ukraine
- Dnepr (motorcycle), a Ukrainian motorcycle brand
- Dnepr (rocket), a 1999 space launch vehicle
- Dnepr radar, Soviet space surveillance and early warning radar
- Dnepr-1 Regiment
- Dnepr-2 Battalion

== See also ==
- Dnieper (disambiguation)
- Dnipro (disambiguation)
