= Dniprovskyi District =

Dniprovskyi District or Dniprovskyi Raion, is a name of several urban districts in Ukraine:

- Dniprovskyi District, Kamianske
- Dniprovskyi District, Kyiv
- Dniprovskyi District, Kherson
- Dniprovskyi District, Zaporizhzhia

== See also ==
- Kamianka-Dniprovska Raion, Zaporizhzhia Oblast, Ukraine
- Dniprovske (former) district, now in Kamianske Raion, Dnipropetrovsk Oblast, Ukraine
- Dnipro Raion, Dnipropetrovsk Oblast, Ukraine
- Dnipro Dnipropetrovsk (disambiguation)
- Dnipropetrovsk (disambiguation)
- Dnipro (disambiguation)
