= Donbassaero =

Ukrainian airline

Donbassaero Airlines
IATA	ICAO	Call sign
7D	UDC	DONBASS AERO
- Founded: 1993, refounded 2003
- Ceased operations: 14 January 2013
- Hubs: Donetsk Airport
- Secondary hubs: Boryspil Airport
- Frequent-flyer program: Meridian loyalty program
- Alliance: Ukrainian Aviation Group
- Fleet size: 10
- Destinations: 15
- Headquarters: Donetsk Airport; Donetsk, Ukraine
- Website: donbassaero.com

Donbassaero (Ukrainian: Донбасаеро, Russian: Донбассаэро) was an airline with its head office on the Donetsk International Airport premises in Donetsk, Ukraine. It operated domestic and international scheduled services. Its main bases were Donetsk International Airport and Boryspil International Airport in Kyiv. The main shareholder of the company was PrivatBank, controlled by Ihor Kolomoyskyi.

== History ==
The airline was founded in 1993 as Donetsk State Airline, then re-organized and re-branded as Donbassaero in 2003. Their website was launched in July 2005 and their online booking system started in November of the same year.

Since 25 March 2012, as a result of the Anti-monopoly committee of Ukraine's decision to allow the consolidation of the Ukrainian Aviation Group's physical and operational assets, Donbassaero no longer operated flights with its own code, but rather on behalf of its parent company Aerosvit.

The airline filed for bankruptcy and ceased operations on 14 January 2013.

== Destinations ==
Donbassaero served the following scheduled destinations (as of January 2013):

- Armenia
  - Yerevan - Zvartnots International Airport
- Azerbaijan
  - Baku - Heydar Aliyev International Airport
- Cyprus
  - Larnaca - Larnaca International Airport
- Georgia
  - Tbilisi - Tbilisi International Airport
- Greece
  - Athens - Athens International Airport
- Lithuania
  - Vilnius - Vilnius International Airport
- Russia
  - Moscow - Domodedovo International Airport.
- Sweden
  - Stockholm - Stockholm International Airport
- Syria
  - Aleppo - Aleppo International Airport
- Turkey
  - Istanbul - Atatürk International Airport
- United Arab Emirates
  - Dubai - Dubai International Airport
- Ukraine
  - Donetsk - Sergey Prokofiev International Airport hub
  - Kharkiv - Kharkiv International Airport
  - Kyiv - Boryspil International Airport hub
  - Odesa - Odesa International Airport

== Fleet ==
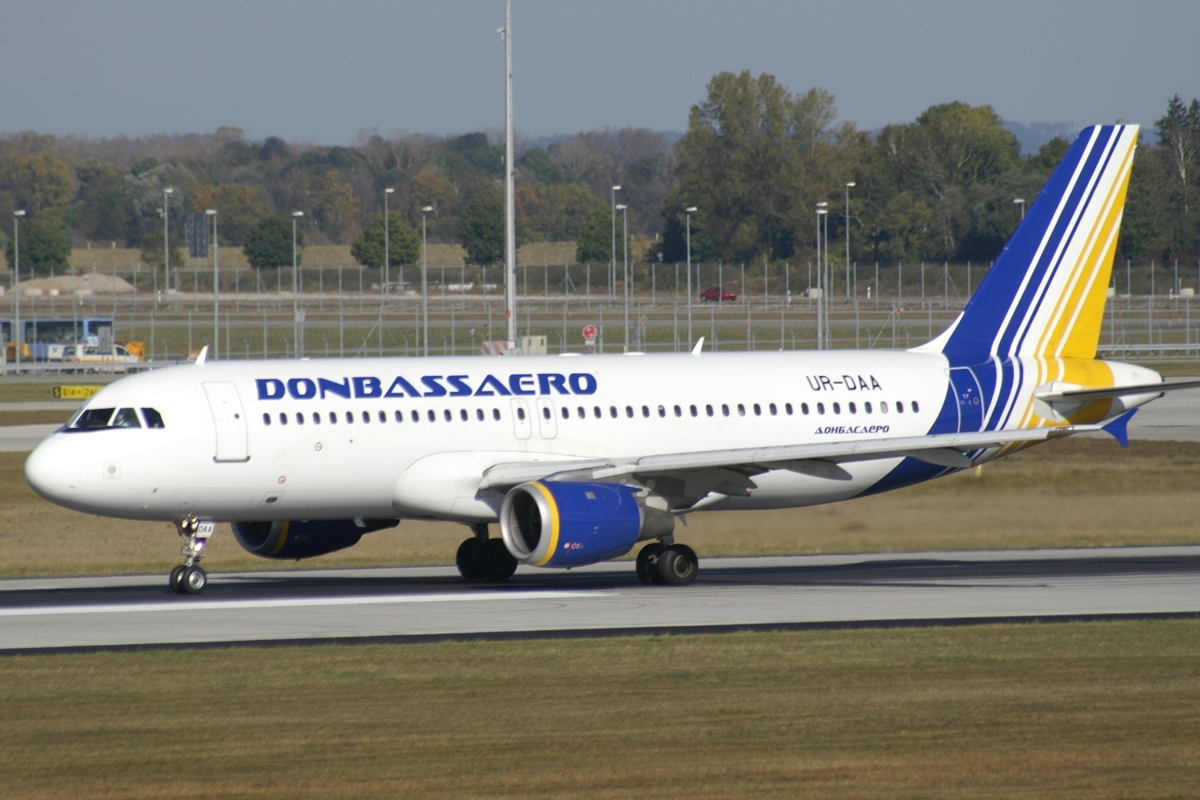
Donbassaero Airbus A320-200

As of December 2012, the Donbassaero fleet included the following aircraft:

Donbassaero Fleet
Aircraft	In fleet	Orders	Passengers			Notes
Aircraft	In fleet	Orders	J	Y	Total	Notes
Airbus A320-200	9	0	12	138	150	3 operated for Aerosvit.
Airbus A321-200	1	0	0	210	210	Leased from WindRose Aviation.
