= Dnipro Dnipropetrovsk (disambiguation) =

Dnipro Dnipropetrovsk is the former name of Ukrainian professional football club in FC Dnipro.

Dnipro Dnipropetrovsk may refer to:

== Places ==
- Dnipro, a city in Ukraine
- Dnipro Raion, a district in Ukraine

== Sports ==
- FC Dnipro-2 Dnipropetrovsk, a Ukrainian reserve football team
- FC Dnipro-3 Dnipropetrovsk, a Ukrainian football team
- FC Dnipro-75 Dnipropetrovsk, a Ukrainian youth football school
- Dnipro (bandy), a Ukrainian bandy club in Dnipro (former Dnipropetrovsk)
- BC Dnipro, a Ukrainian professional basketball club in Dnipro (former Dnipropetrovsk)

== See also ==
- Dniprovskyi District (disambiguation)
- Dnipropetrovsk (disambiguation)
- Dnipro (disambiguation)
