= Dnieper (disambiguation) =

Dnieper (Russian: Днепр) or Dnipro (Ukrainian: Дніпро) is a major river, rising in Russia and flowing through Belarus and Ukraine to the Black Sea.

Dnieper may also refer to:

- Dnieper Ukraine, usually referring to territory on either side of the middle course of the Dnieper River
- Battle of the Dnieper, a World War II military campaign
- Dnieper Lowland
- Dnieper Upland

== See also ==
- Dnepr (disambiguation)
- Dnipro (disambiguation)
- On the Dnieper, a 1932 ballet by Prokofiev
