= Dniproavia =

Ukrainian airline

Dniproavia Дніпроавіа
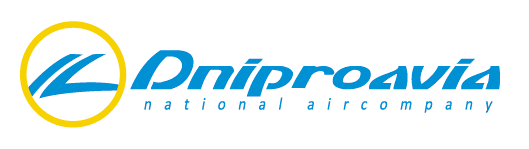
IATA	ICAO	Call sign
Z6	UDN	DNIEPRO
- Founded: 1996
- Ceased operations: 2017
- Hubs: Dnipro International Airport
- Secondary hubs: Boryspil International Airport
- Frequent-flyer program: Bonus Club
- Alliance: Ukrainian Aviation Group
- Fleet size: 2
- Destinations: 7
- Parent company: Privat Group
- Headquarters: Dnipro, Ukraine
- Website: dniproavia.com

Dniproavia (Ukrainian: Дніпроавіа) was an airline headquartered at Dnipro International Airport in Dnipro, Ukraine, which operated scheduled and chartered passenger flights.

== History ==
Dniproavia was established in 1933 as Dnipropetrovsk Integrated Air Squad, forming part of then Soviet national airline Aeroflot. On 22 June 1996, the airline became a joint stock company in a state-owned entity which included Dnipropetrovsk International Airport, thus giving the airline full control over its home base. Dniproavia announced a loss of just over 6 million USD for 2006, despite increasing revenues by 17 percent and carrying 54 percent more passengers. It blamed the loss on the suspension of its flights to Germany, due to a dispute with the German authorities over Lufthansa's landing rights at Dnipropetrovsk Airport. In October 2009, the airline was sold to Galtera investment group, however, it was controlled by Ukrainian-Israeli entrepreneur Ihor Kolomoyskyi's Privat Group.

As of 25 March 2012, as a result of the anti-monopoly committee of Ukraine's decision to allow the consolidation of the Ukrainian Aviation Group's physical and operational assets, Dniproavia no longer operates flights with its own code, but rather on behalf of its parent company Aerosvit. By mid-June 2012, the airline introduced their first Embraer E190. All Embraer E190s were ordered and operated by Dniproavia, but they were operated for the airline-partner AeroSvit.

On 9 January 2013, the company ceased all operations, but some flights were resumed on 1 February 2013.

Due to a legal dispute regarding the nationalization of the airline, most of its aircraft were transferred to Windrose Airlines, with just two remaining in the fleet of Dniproavia. In November 2017, Dniproavia was declared bankrupt. On 15 May 2020, the Supreme Court of Ukraine upheld the decision of the Kyiv Commercial Court, leaving the company in the ownership of a private owner.

== Destinations ==
As of January 2017, Dniproavia served domestic routes within Ukraine as well as international services to Bulgaria, Israel and Romania on a scheduled basis.

== Fleet ==
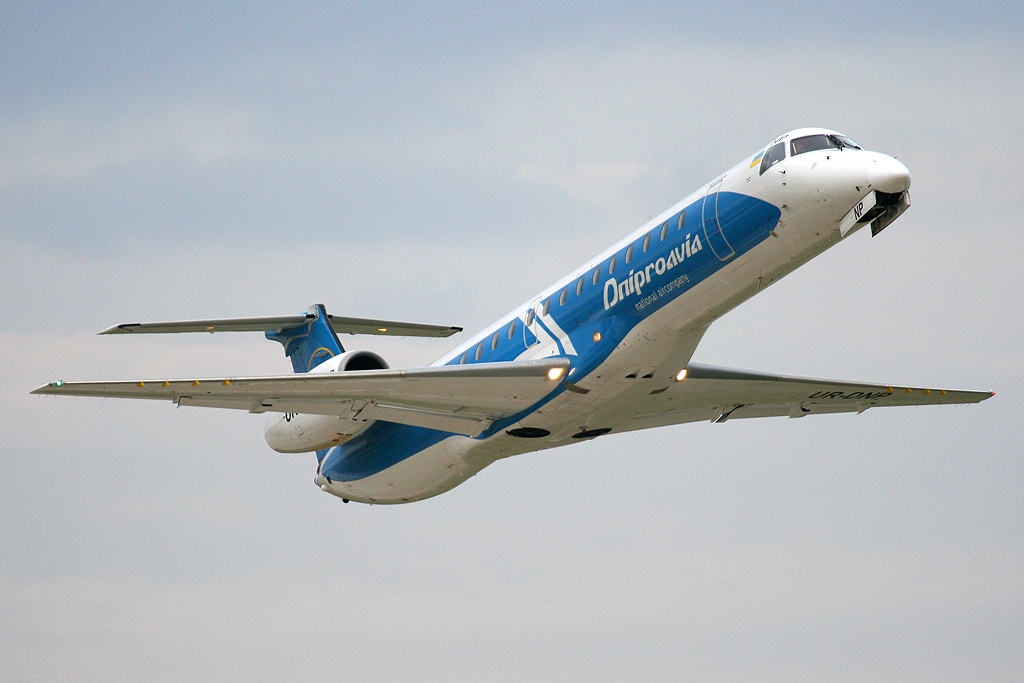
Dniprovavia Embraer ERJ-145

As of May 2017, the Dniproavia fleet consisted of the following aircraft:

Dniproavia fleet
Aircraft	In fleet	Orders	Passengers	Notes
Embraer ERJ-145	2	—	48	
Total	2	—		

=== Historical fleet ===
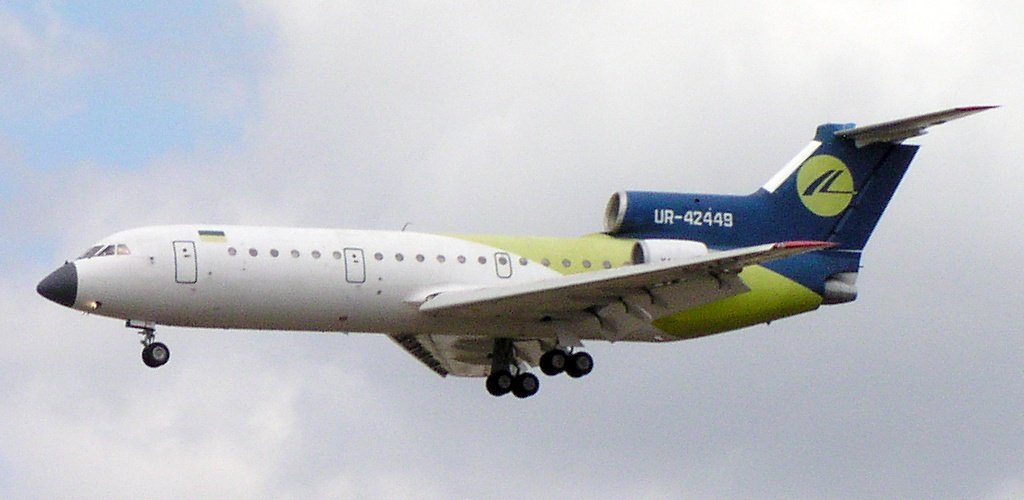
Dniproavia Yakovlev Yak-42 in 2005

The airline also operated the following aircraft:

- Antonov An-26
- Boeing 737-300
- Boeing 737-400
- Boeing 737-500
- Boeing 767-300ER
- Embraer ERJ-190
- Yakovlev Yak-40
- Yakovlev Yak-42

== Accidents and incidents ==
- 24 April 2003: A Dniproavia Yakovlev Yak-40 (registered UR-87918) ran off the runway after a hard landing at Dnipropetrovsk International Airport following a scheduled domestic flight. The aircraft came to a rest 100 metres away from the runway and was substantially damaged. There were no fatal injuries amongst the 13 passengers and four crew members on board.
- 28 April 2011: A Dniproavia Embraer ERJ-145 (registered UR-DNK) ran off the taxiway after having just exited the runway at Moscow's Sheremetyevo International Airport. As a result of this, the aircraft's landing gear gave way and its chassis was badly damaged. However, the aircraft was quickly evacuated and made safe by airport rescue personnel and no injuries were reported, amongst the 30 passengers and four crew members, as a result of the incident.
