= Air Ukraine =

Ukrainian airline (1992–2004)

Air Ukraine Авіалінії України

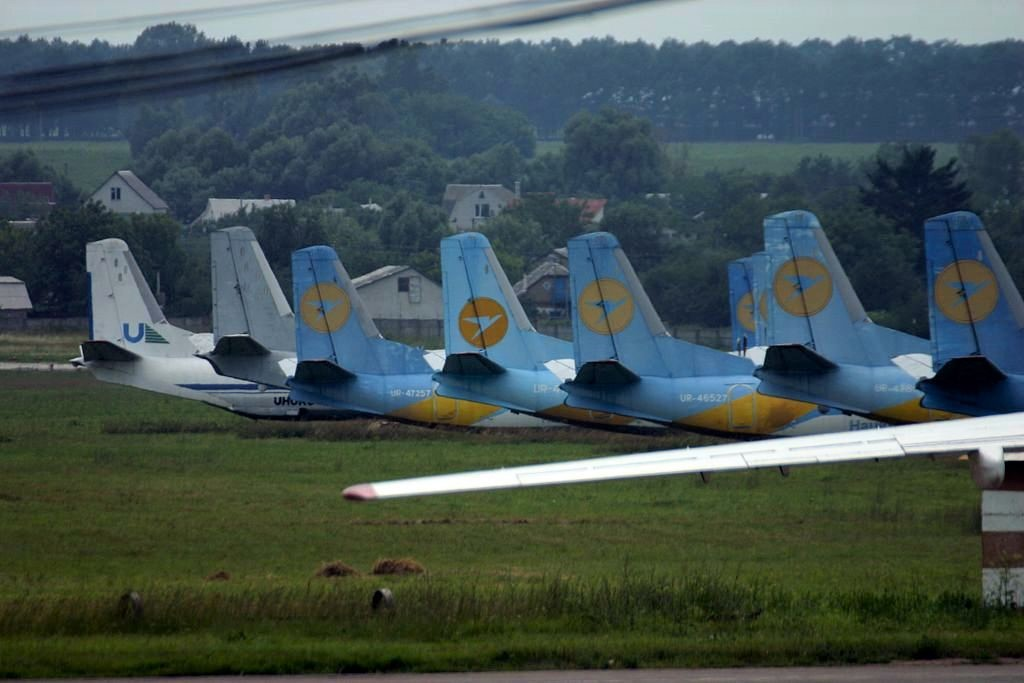
- Air Ukraine tail lineup
IATA	ICAO	Call sign
6U	UKR	AIR UKRAINE
- Founded: 1992
- Ceased operations: 2002 (flight operations suspended); 2004 (AOC revoked)
- Hubs: Boryspil International Airport
- Headquarters: Kyiv, Ukraine

Air Ukraine (Ukrainian: Авіалінії України Avialiniyi Ukrayiny) was a state-owned airline from Ukraine, serving as flag carrier of the country from 1992 to 2002. Headquartered in Kyiv, Air Ukraine operated scheduled passenger and cargo flights mostly on domestic routes or within the Commonwealth of Independent States, but also to global destinations. Its role as flag carrier was transferred to Ukraine International Airlines.

== History ==
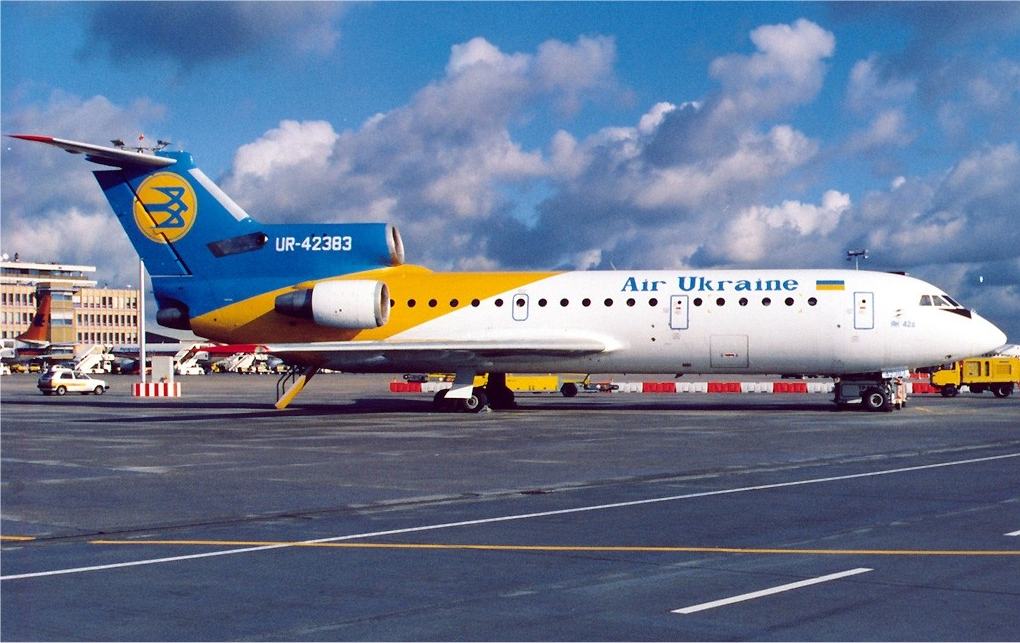
An Air Ukraine Yakovlev Yak-42 (in the later dedicated Air Ukraine livery) at Stuttgart Airport (1998).

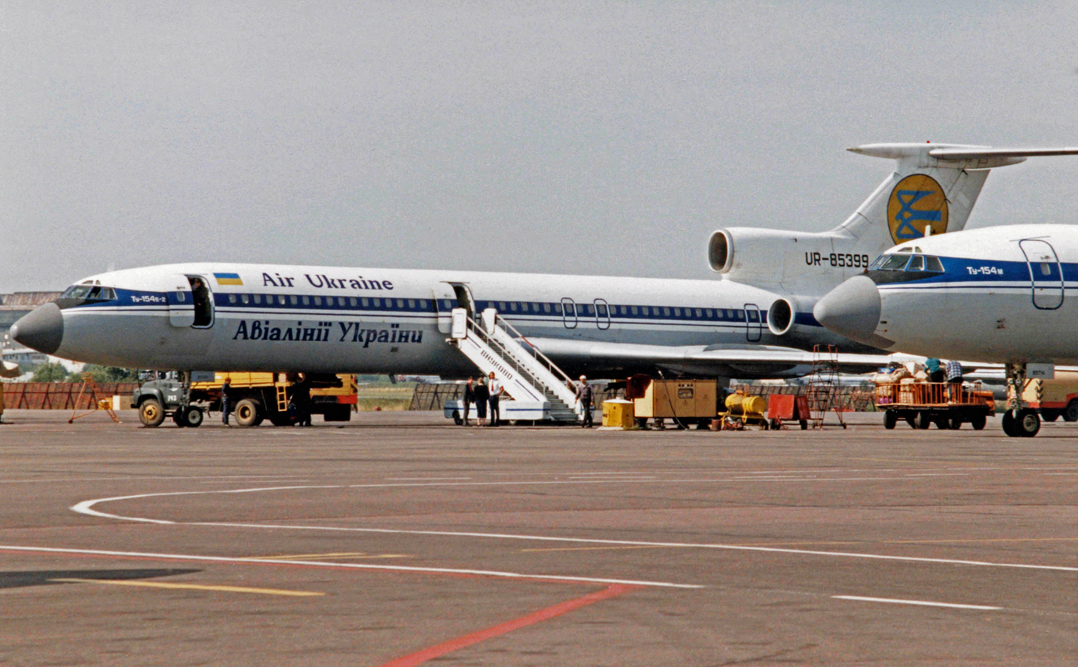
Two Air Ukraine Tupolev Tu-154 aircraft (still in Aeroflot colours but with Air Ukraine titles) at Moscow's Vnukovo Airport (1994).

The Dissolution of the Soviet Union during 1990 and 1991 lead to the split-up of former Soviet carrier Aeroflot in 1992, with Air Ukraine being founded out of the Aeroflot's Kyiv directorate. Soon, other Ukrainian divisions were merged into it to create a national airline.. By 2001, the airline had a small fleet of 5 aircraft which meant its operations had significantly shrunk.

In December 2002, Air Ukraine was declared to be bankrupt. Attempts to relaunch the company by merging it with Aerosvit Airlines or Ukraine International Airlines failed, and the airline license was finally withdrawn on 23 July 2004.

== Fleet ==
Over the years, Air Ukraine operated the following aircraft types:

Aircraft	Introduced	Retired	Total Number
Antonov An-12	1993	1997	3
Antonov An-24	1993	2001	64
Antonov An-26	1993	2002	12
Antonov An-30	1993	2003	9
Antonov An-32	1993	2001	10
Antonov An-124	1993	1997	2
Boeing 737-200	1994	1998	2
Boeing 737-300	1995	1996	1
Boeing 737-400	1992	1995	2
Ilyushin Il-18	1993	1999	2
Ilyushin Il-62	1993	2002	10
Ilyushin Il-76	1993	2004	13
Let L-410 Turbolet	1993	2002	42
Tupolev Tu-134	1993	2004	32
Tupolev Tu-154	1993	2004	39
Yakovlev Yak-40	1993	2002	36
Yakovlev Yak-42	1993	2001	28

== Gallery ==
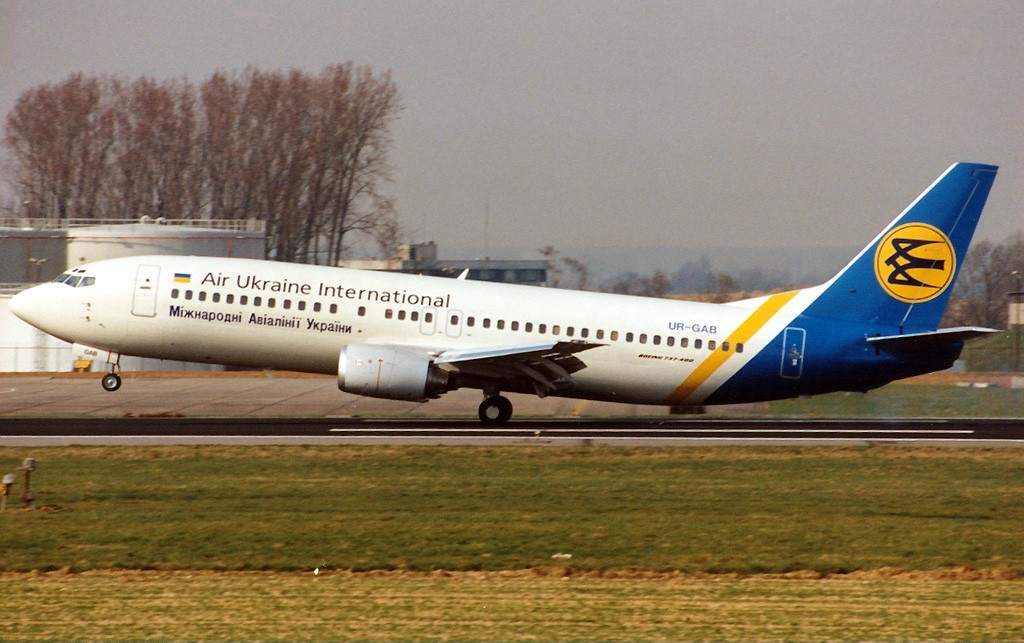
Air Ukraine International 737-400

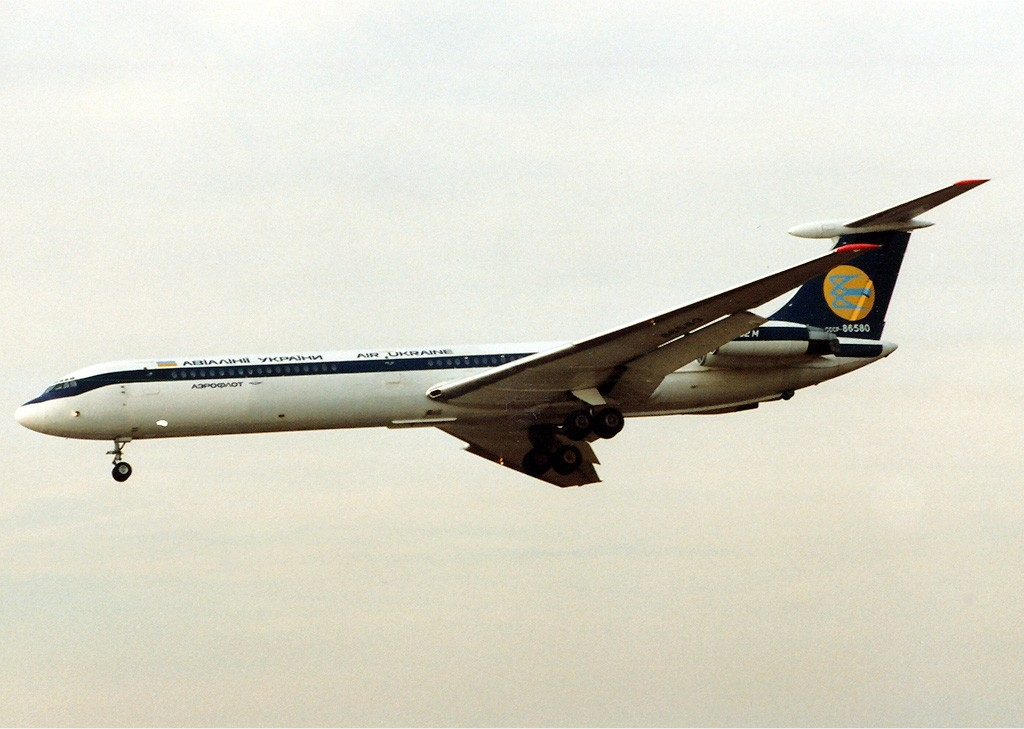
Air Ukraine Ilyushin Il-62

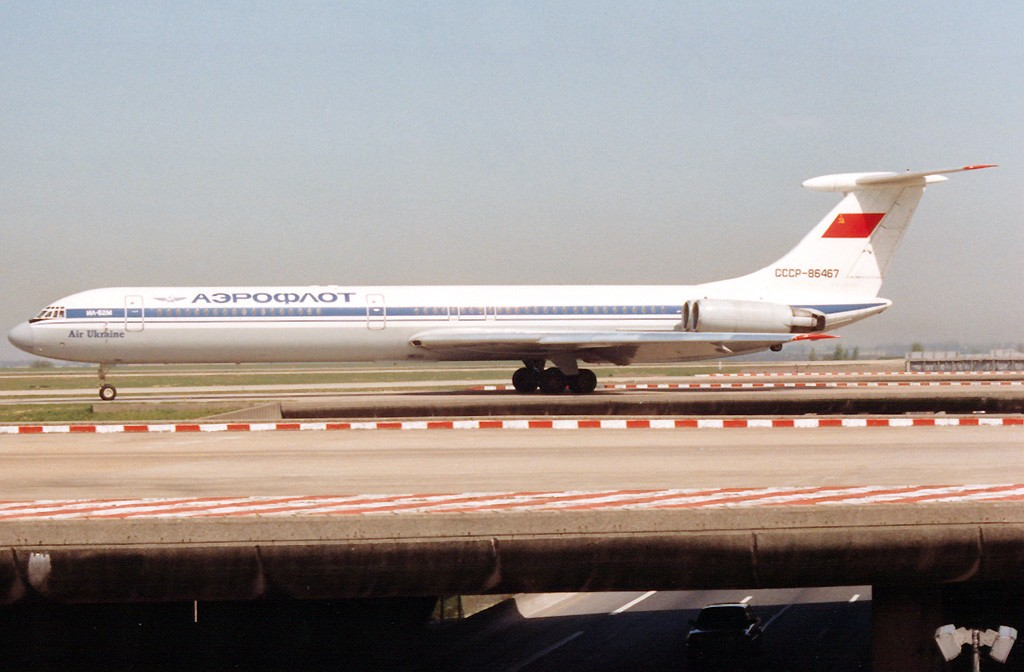
Air Ukraine IL 62 in Aeroflot colours

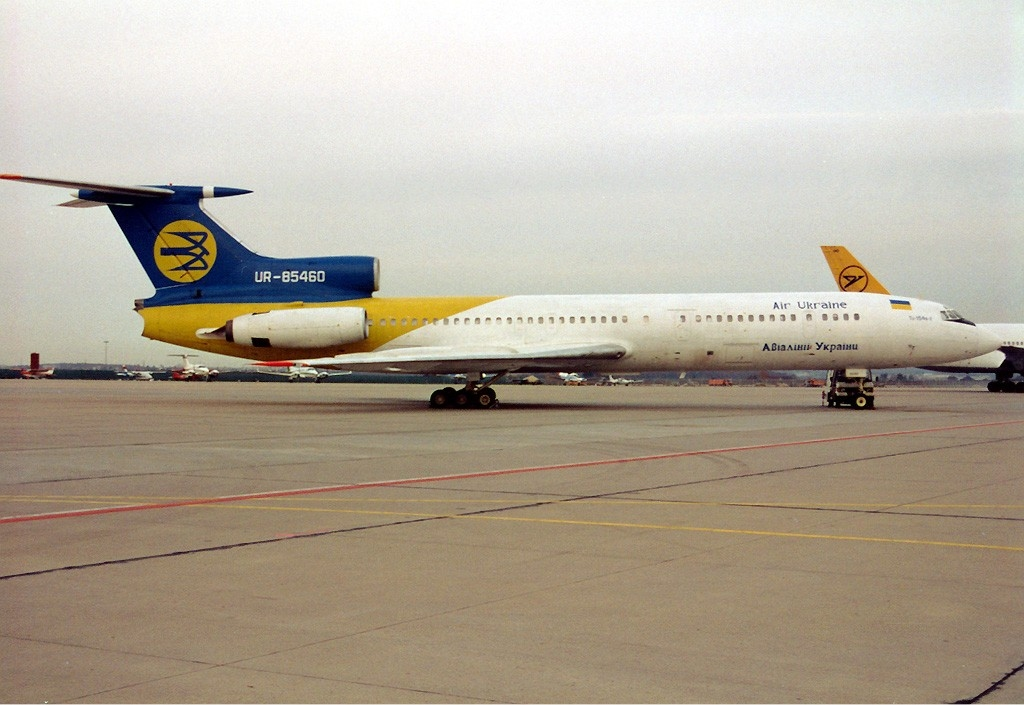
Air Ukraine TU 154B-2

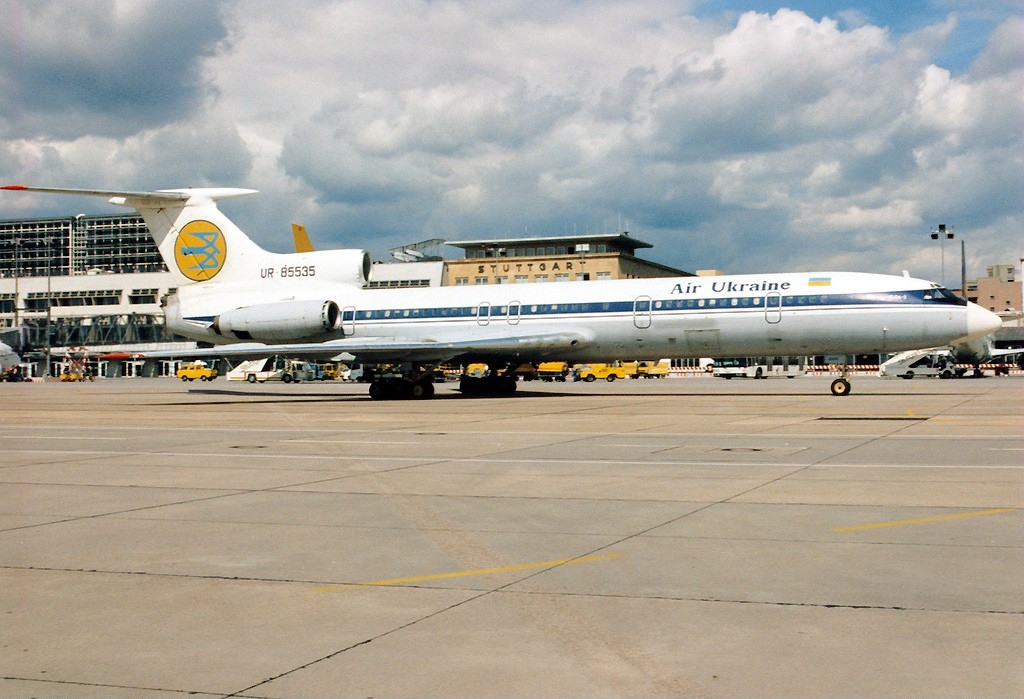
Older TU 154 livery

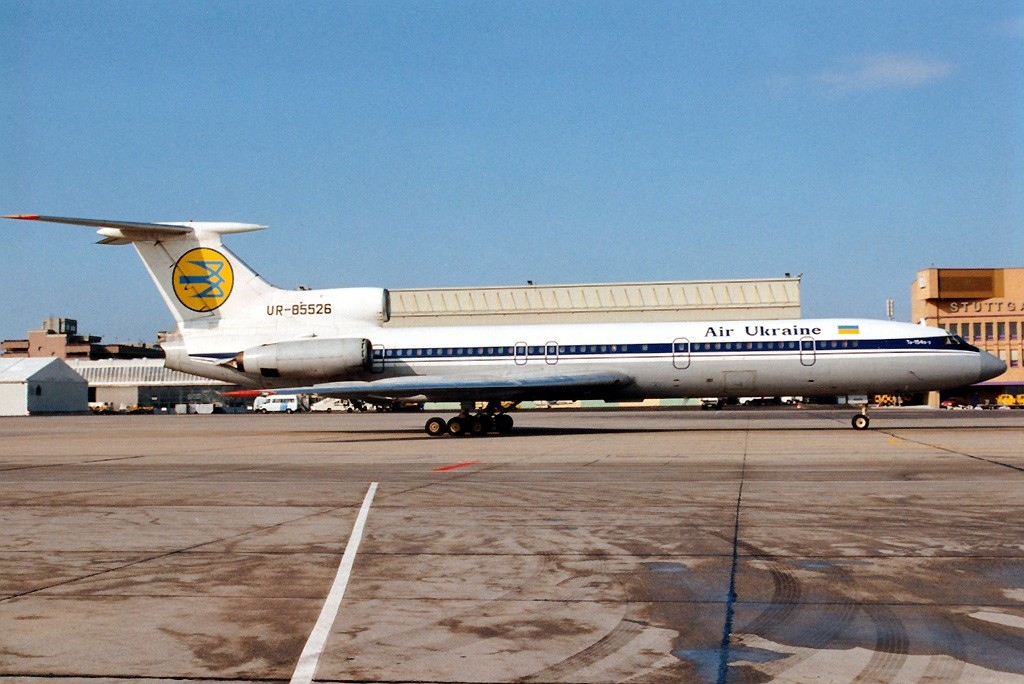
Another TU 154

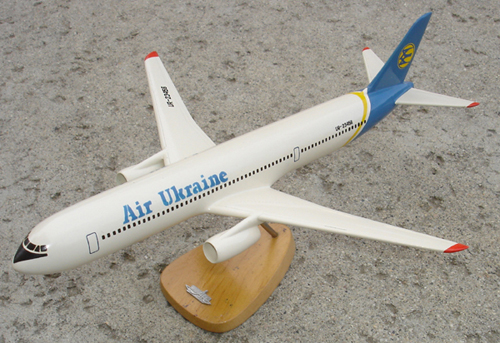
Antonov AN 218 model

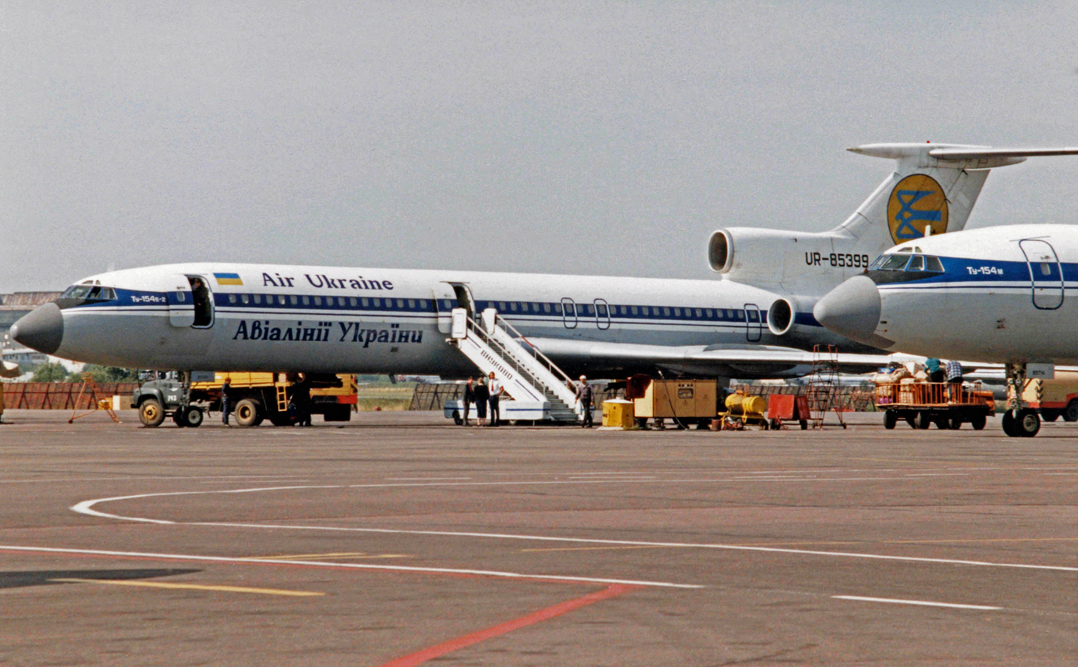
Two Tupolev 154s of Air Ukraine

== Incidents ==
- On 5 September 1992, the crew of an Air Ukraine Tupolev Tu-154 (registered CCCP-85269) with 147 people on board had to execute a belly-landing at Boryspil International Airport because the landing gear could not be deployed. The aircraft was damaged beyond repair.
- On 23 January 1995, a Turbolet (registered UR-67115) was destroyed when it crashed on a frozen lake whilst approaching Provedeniya Airport in Russia because of an engine failure. The three crew members on board had been on an empty ferry flight from Anadyr Airport, which was planned to continue onwards to Honduras, where the aircraft had been sold. There were no fatalities.
- On 4 April 1995, the pilots of an Air Ukraine Antonov An-26 (registered UR-26049) tried to take off from Palana Airport without having released the brakes. The aircraft thus was not able to get airborne, and overshot the runway, being damaged beyond economical repair. The nine people that had been on the chartered flight to Ust-Pakhachi Airport survived the accident.
