= Windrose Airlines =

Ukrainian charter airline

Windrose Airlines Авіакомпанія Роза Вітрів

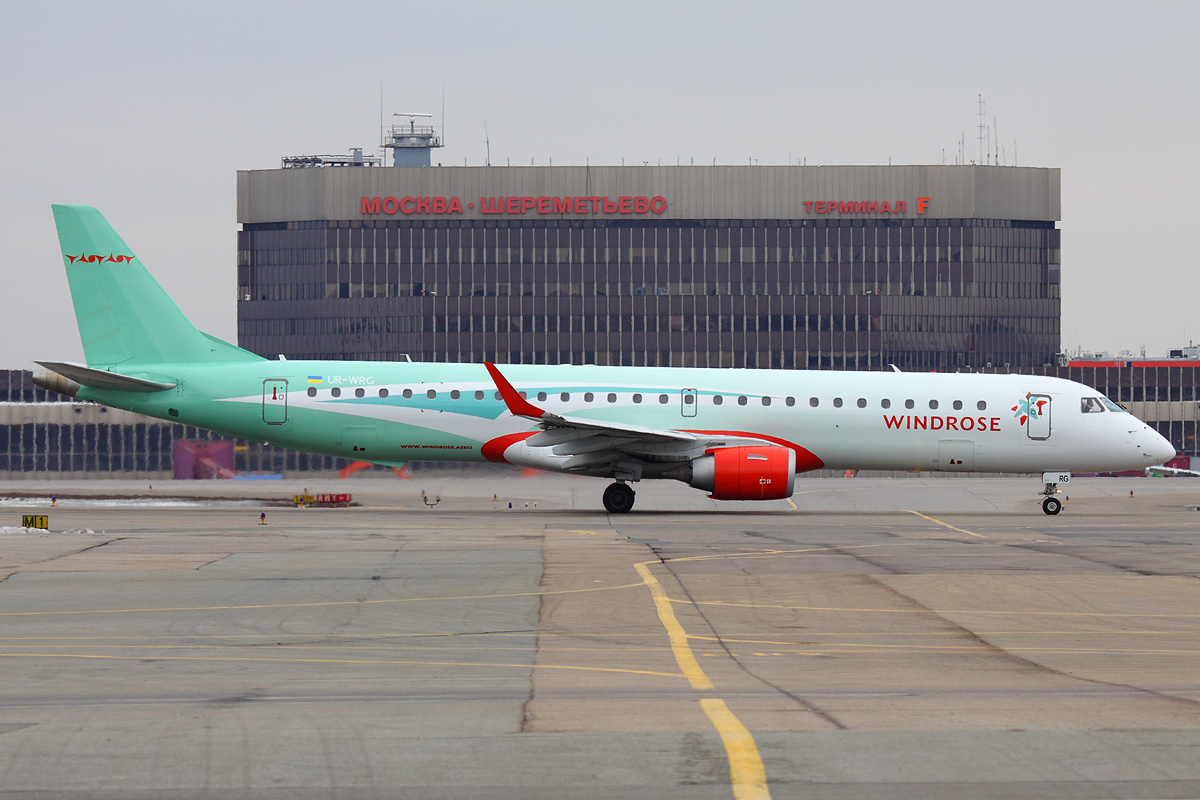
- Windrose Airlines Embraer 195
IATA	ICAO	Call sign
7W	WRC	WINDROSE
- Founded: 28 October 2003
- Operating bases: Boryspil International Airport; Dnipro International Airport
- Fleet size: 3
- Headquarters: Kyiv, Ukraine
- Key people: Volodymyr Kamenchuk (general director)
- Website: windrose.aero

Windrose Aviation Company, known and trading as Windrose Airlines, is a Ukrainian charter airline based at Boryspil International Airport. Founded on 28 October 2003, the airline's headquarters is in Kyiv.

As of April 2026, the airline has a fleet of three aircraft, and operates charter flights on behalf of airlines in Africa.

== History ==
The airline was established in 2003 to provide charter flights to destinations in Europe and the Middle East.

In 2006, regular flights to Moscow and Kaliningrad in Russia were initiated. In 2008, the company expanded its route network, then sharply reduced it. Since 2008, Windrose Airlines has focused on charter flights. From 2010 to the present day, the airline has been licensed to operate regular flights, should the need arise. The airline was the first to carry out flights basing its aircraft at various airports in Ukraine.

In December 2019, the company rebranded to Windrose Airlines. In June 2020, the company started domestic flights in Ukraine.

As a result of the 24 February 2022 Russian invasion of Ukraine, the company suspended all flights, stating "due to the imposition of martial law in the country, Windrose will suspend flights indefinitely, but we will be in touch."

In the early months of the 2022 Russian invasion of Ukraine, it was necessary to create an efficient logistics for delivering humanitarian and medical air cargo from the USA. The Windrose Airlines provided the American charity Revival Foundation with the opportunity to quickly deliver cargo by charter flights at a non-commercial cost transporting aid from John F. Kennedy International Airport (New York) to Lublin Airport and Warsaw Chopin Airport in Poland. After that, the humanitarian aid shipments transported by rail and trucks from Poland to Ukraine, where of the aid was distributed to local recipients.

As of March 2024, Windrose Airlines operated charter flights under contract with Fly One Airlines out of destinations such as Tbilisi, Yerevan and Chisinau. As of June 2026, it uses three aircraft to operate flights for airlines based in Mozambique and Nigeria.

== Fleet ==
=== Current fleet ===
As of April 2026, Windrose Airlines operates the following aircraft. All aircraft currently operated are wet-leased to airlines based in Mozambique and Nigeria.

Windrose Airlines fleet
Aircraft	In service	Orders	Passengers	Notes
Airbus A319-100	1	—	144	Wet leased to LAM Mozambique Airlines in 2025.
Embraer 190	2	—	104	Both aircraft wet leased to United Nigeria Airlines
Total	3	—		

=== Historic fleet ===
Over the years, Windrose Airlines has operated the following aircraft:

Aircraft	Total	Year introduced	Year retired	Notes
Airbus A320-200	5	2015	2025	One destroyed at Dnipro International Airport.
Airbus A321-200	2	2011	2022	
Airbus A330-200	1	2017	2017	
ATR 72-600	3	2020	2022	
Boeing 737-800	1	2024	2024	Former Ukraine International Airlines aircraft (UR-PSP).
Boeing 737-900ER	1	2024	2024	Former Ukraine International Airlines aircraft (UR-PSI).
Embraer 145	7	2017	2021	Inherited from Dniproavia.
Embraer 195	2	2009	2013	
McDonell Douglas MD-82	3	2007	2012	
McDonell Douglas MD-83	1	2008	2012	

=== Gallery ===
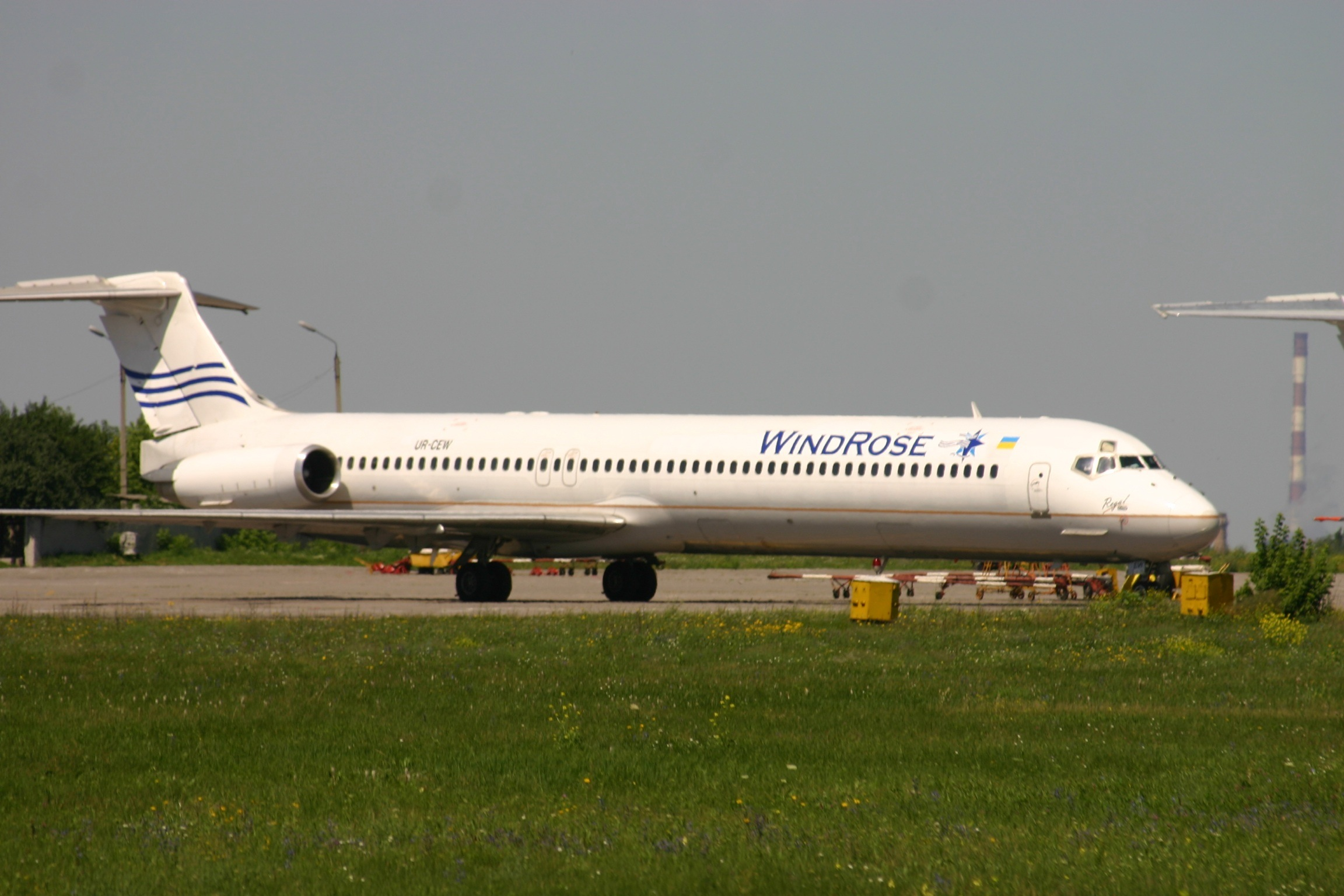
McDonnell Douglas MD-82

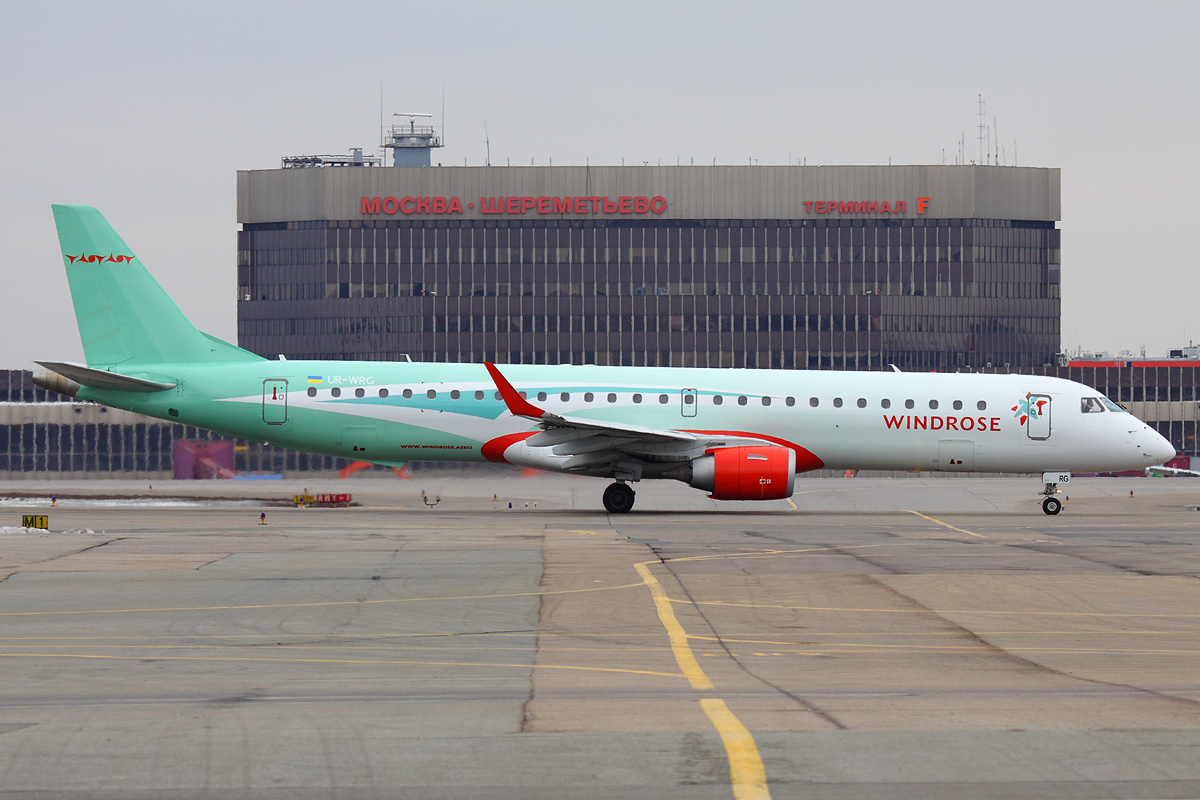
Embraer 195

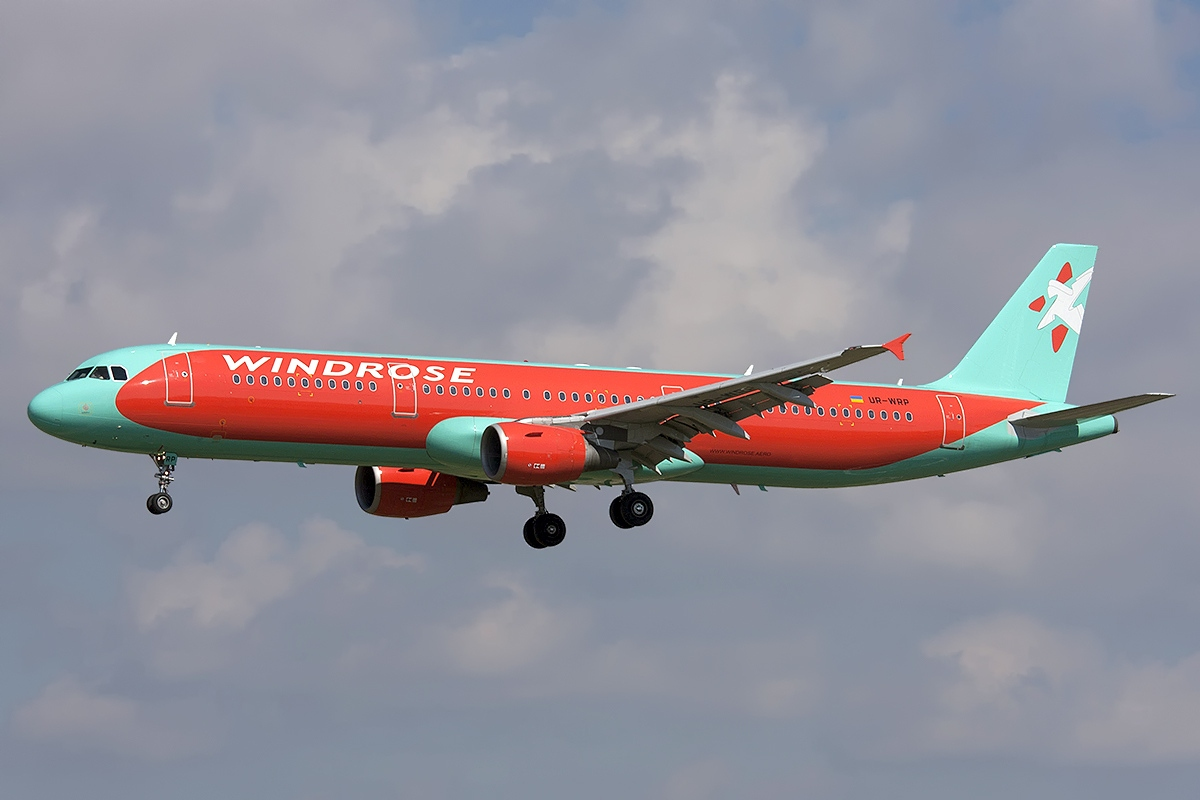
Airbus A321-200

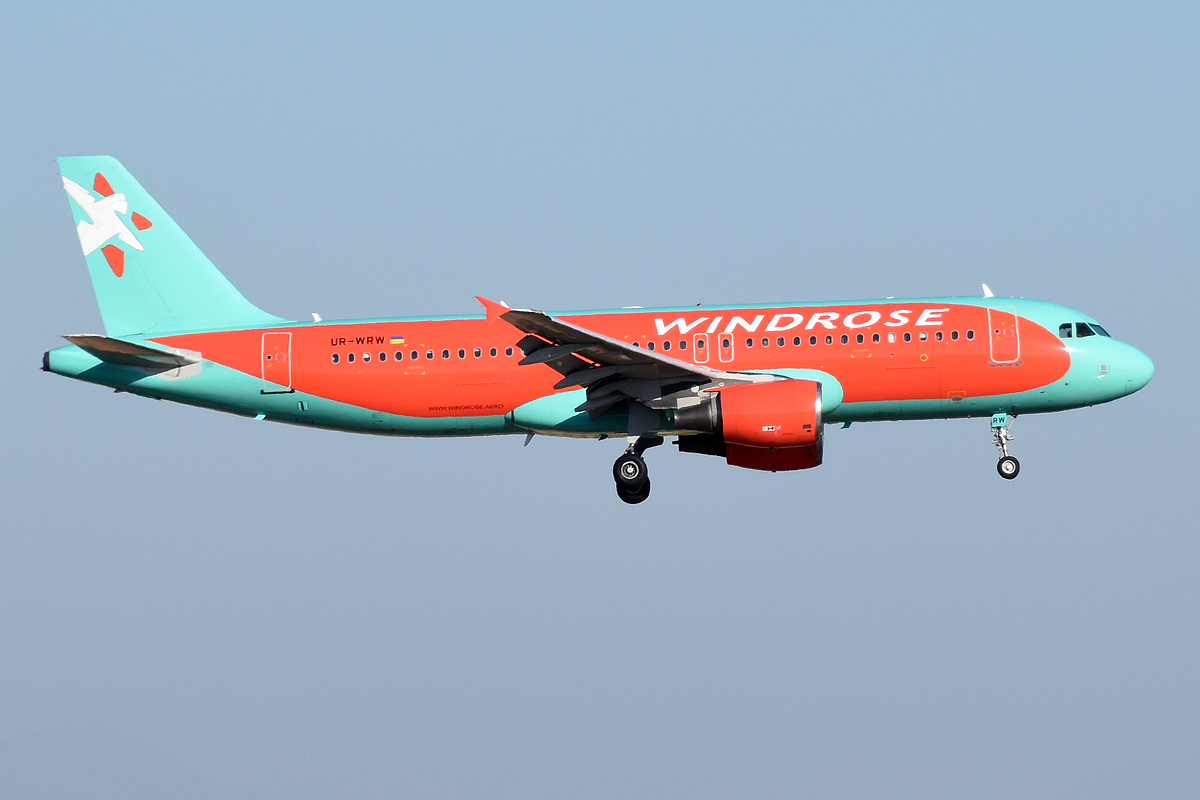
Airbus A320-200

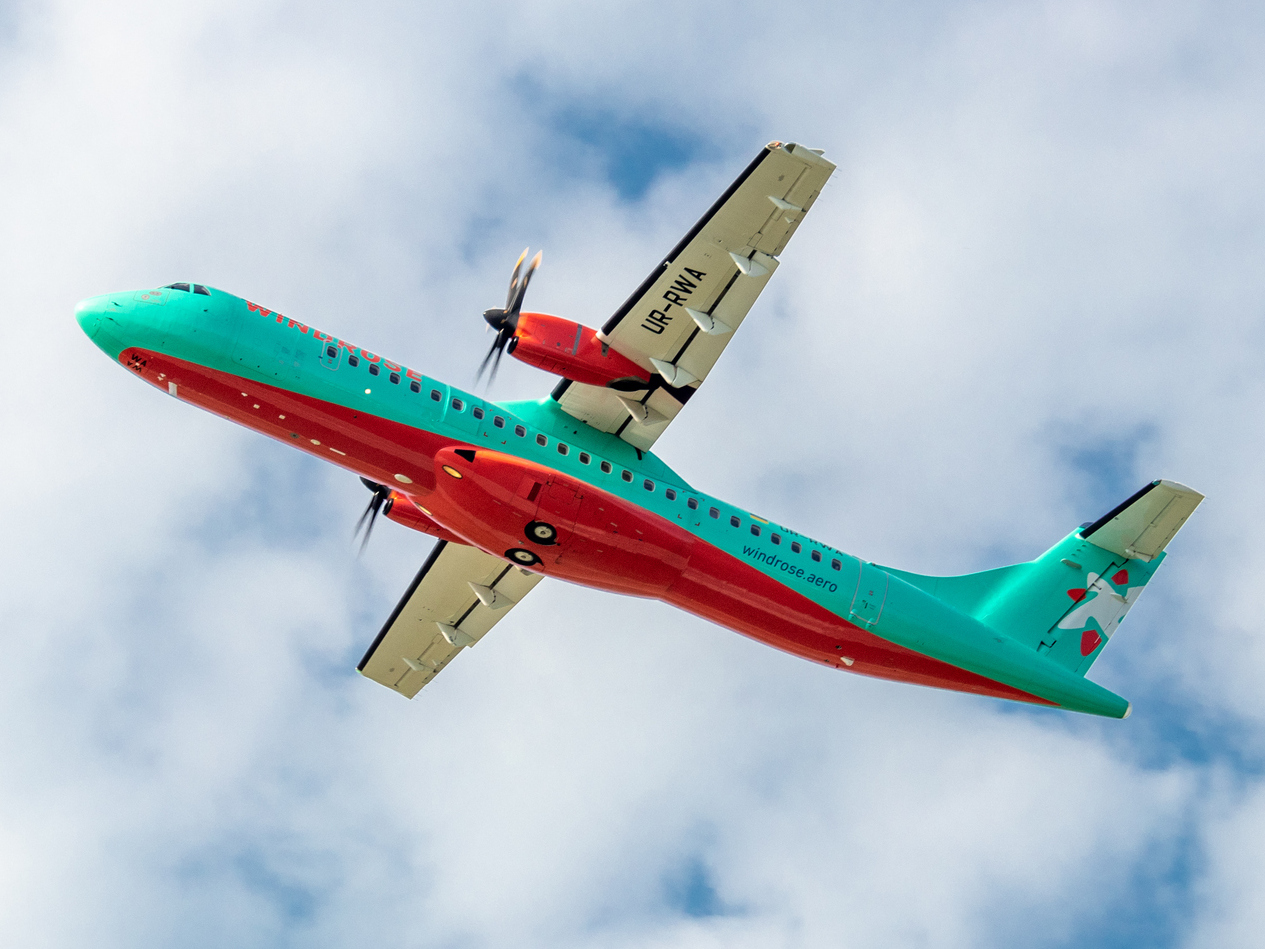
ATR 72-600

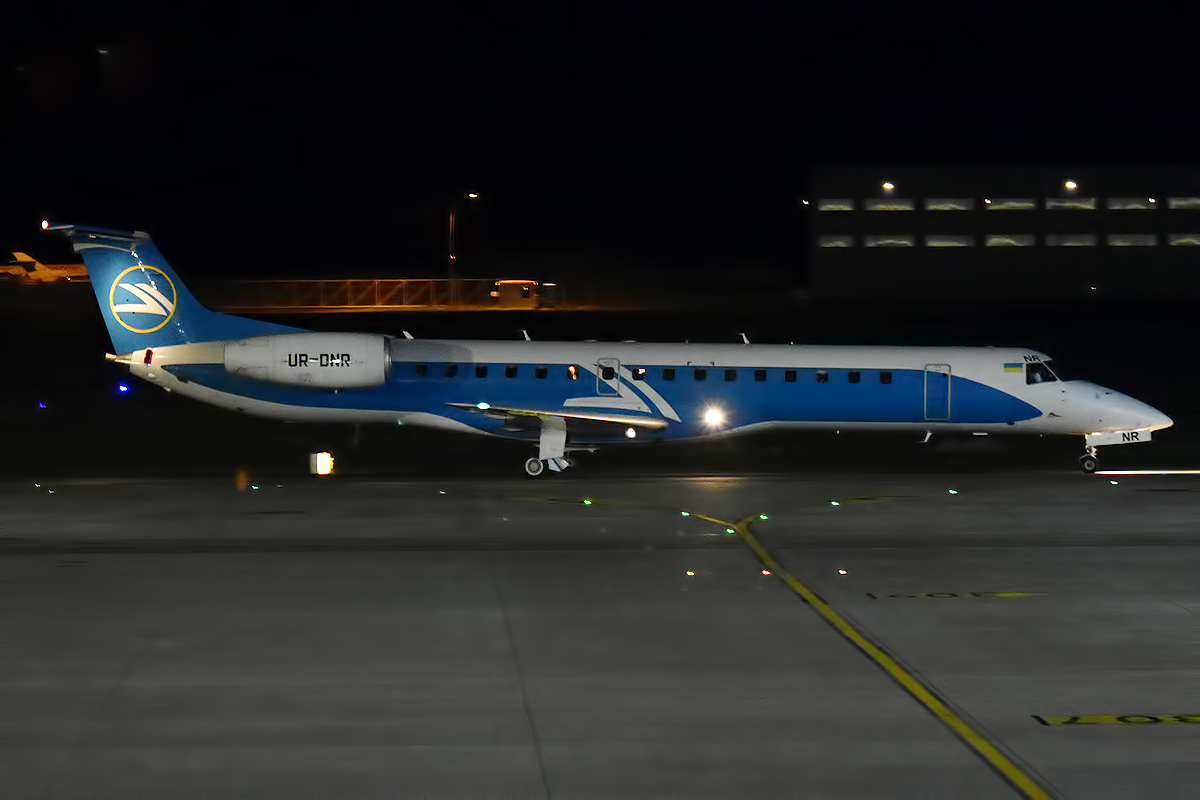
Embraer 145

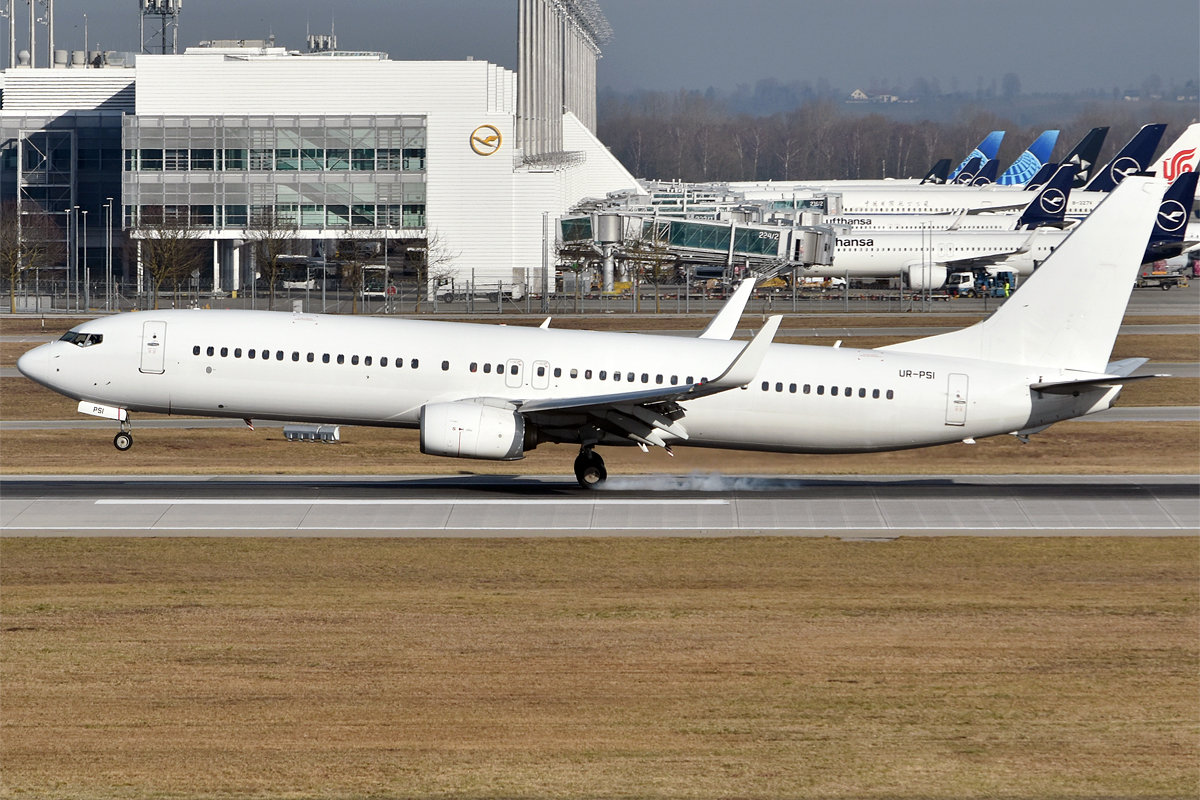
Boeing 737-900ER

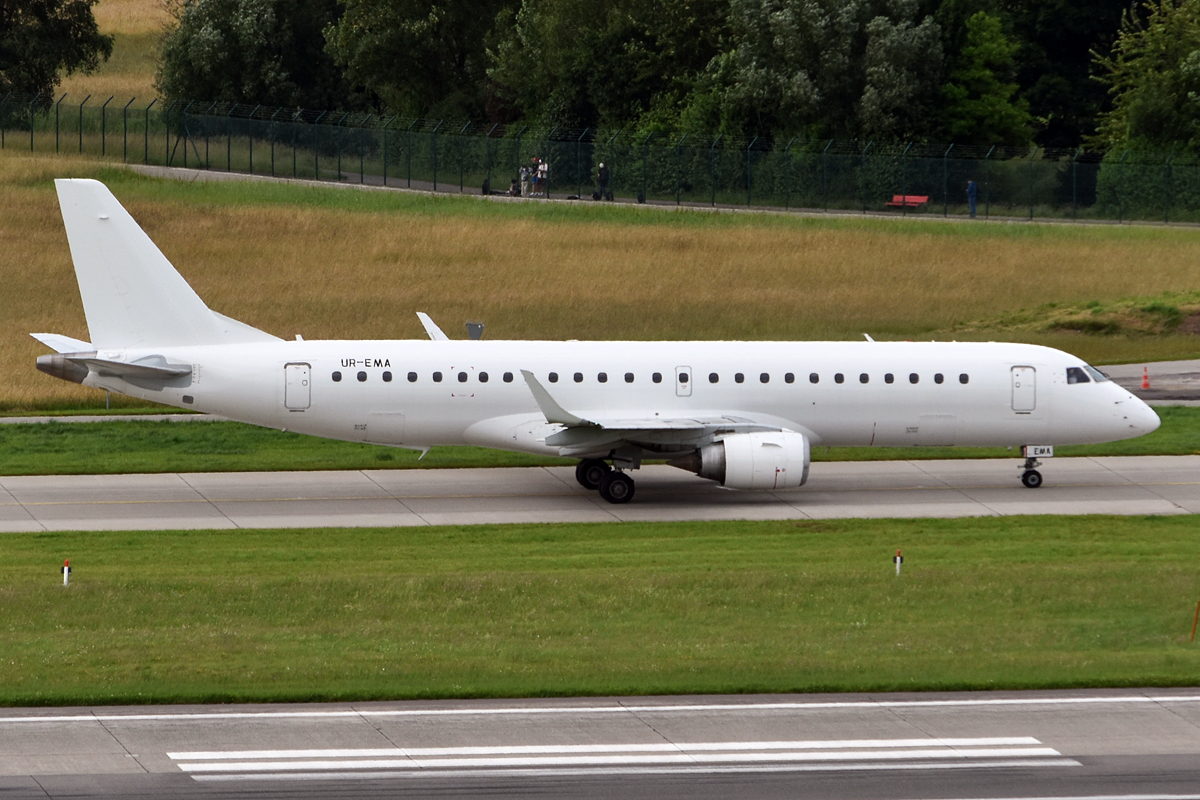
Windrose Airlines Embraer ERJ-190

== Incidents and accidents ==
- On 5 April 2025, five Windrose Airlines aircraft (one Airbus A320-200, two Airbus A321-200 and two ATR 72-600) were destroyed at Dnipro International Airport after a Russian Geran-2 strike hit the airport maintenance hangar in the Russo-Ukrainian War. There were no reported fatalities.
- On 29 March 2026, a Windrose Airlines Embraer 190, registration UR-EMA, leased to United Nigeria Airlines suffered damage on the ground at Murtala Muhammed International Airport, Lagos after the jet blast from another aircraft displaced ground handling equipment.
