= Dnipro International Airport =

Airport in Dnipro, Ukraine

Dnipro International Airport Міжнародний аеропорт «Дніпро»
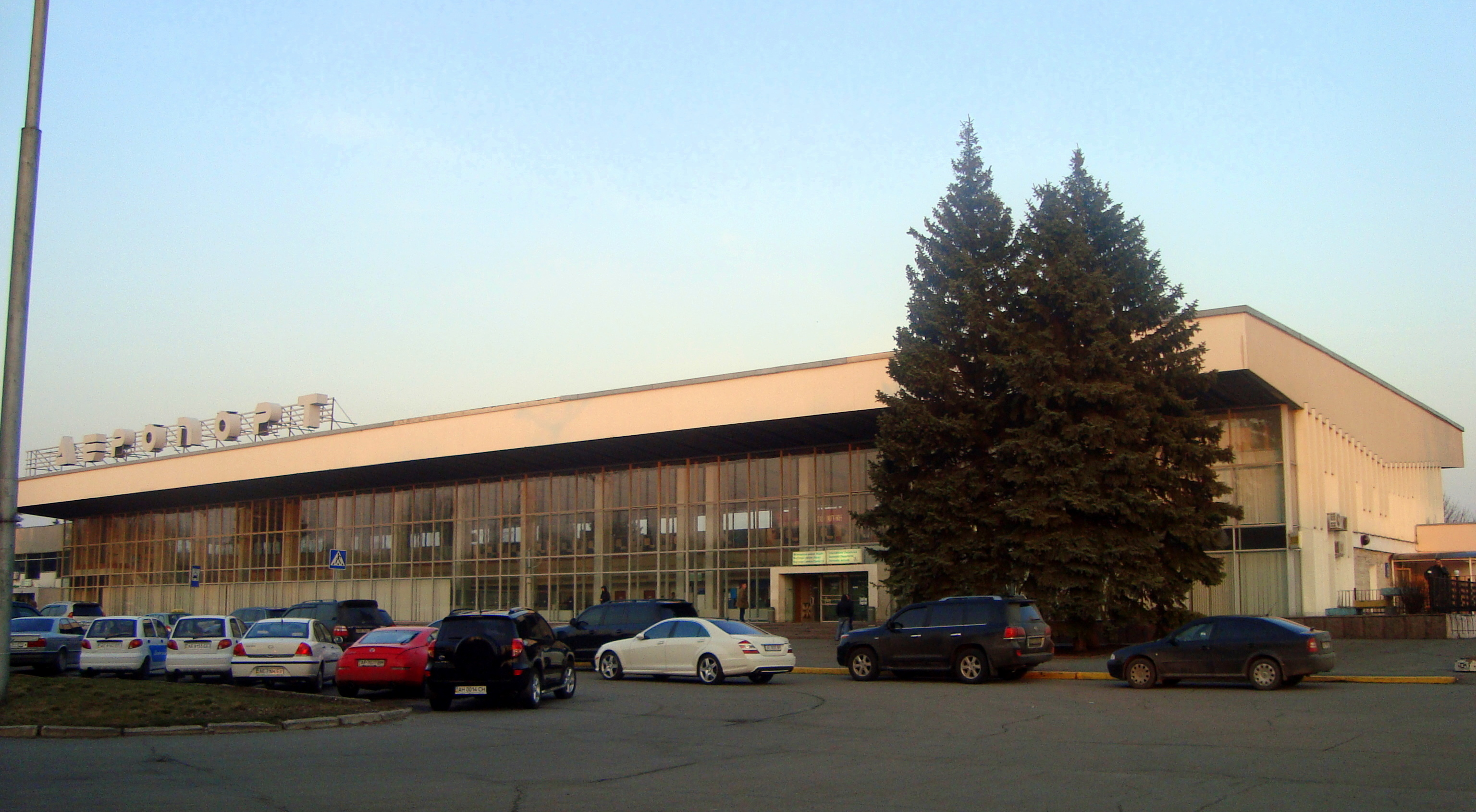
- IATA: DNK; ICAO: UKDD

Summary
- Airport type: Public
- Serves: Dnipro
- Location: Dnipro, Dnipropetrovsk Oblast, Ukraine
- Elevation AMSL: 481 ft (147 m)
- Coordinates: 48°21′26″N 35°06′02″E
- Website: dnk.aero

Maps
- Location of airport in Ukraine
- Interactive map of Dnipro; International Airport

Runways
Direction	Length		Surface
Direction	m	ft	Surface
08/26	2,841	9,320	Concrete

Statistics (2017)
- Passengers: ▼276,954
- Source: DAFIF

Dnipro International Airport (Ukrainian: Міжнародний аеропорт «Дніпро», romanized: Mizhnarodnyi aeroport «Dnipro») (IATA: DNK, ICAO: UKDD) was an airport serving Dnipro, a city in Dnipropetrovsk Oblast, Ukraine. It is located 15 kilometres (9 mi; 8 nmi) southeast from the city center.

On 24 February 2022, Ukraine closed airspace to civilian flights due to the Russian invasion of Ukraine. On 10 April 2022 a Russian attack completely destroyed the airport and the infrastructure nearby.

== Facilities ==
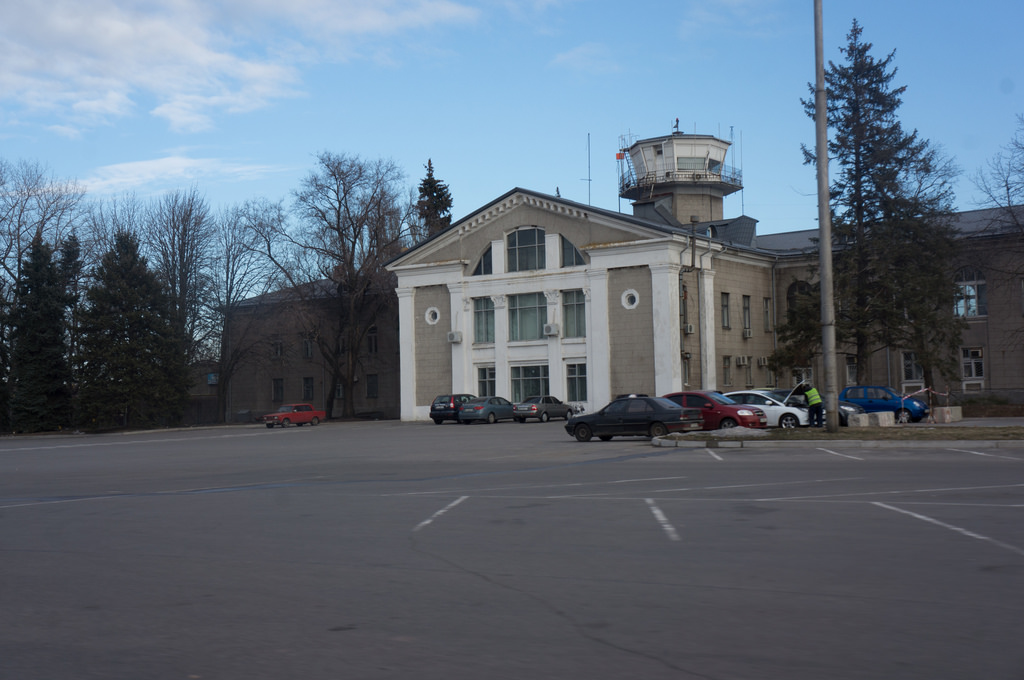
Dnipro International Airport Old Terminal

The airport is at an elevation of 481 feet (147 m) above mean sea level. It had one runway designated 08/26 with a concrete surface measuring 2,841 by 44 metres (9,321 ft × 144 ft). The airport is currently owned by its major airline partner Dniproavia. This has resulted in a number of management problems and has slowed the airfield's development as Dniproavia has, on a number of occasions, refused to be forthcoming with the required funds to undertake a comprehensive modernization program. In addition to this, foreign airlines have found it difficult to gain access to Dnipro as a result of Dniproavia's protectionist policies along routes to and from the airport.

In 2011, the airport's owners initiated a program to develop a new terminal complex. This project envisaged the construction of a large new international terminal, similar in specifications to the newly built terminal at Kharkiv International Airport. However, the construction was soon frozen and, as of 2017, building work has not progressed beyond the laying of foundations. In September 2020 the completion of a new runway and terminal was foreseen for late 2022 or early 2023.

On 24 February 2022, Ukraine closed airspace to civilian flights due to the Russian invasion of Ukraine.

On 15 March 2022, the airport was heavily damaged by Russian missiles. The runway was destroyed according to official statement of the head of Dnipropetrovsk Oblast Administration. A repeat attack on 10 April 2022 completely destroyed the airport and the infrastructure nearby.

== Airlines and destinations ==
The following airlines operated regular scheduled and charter services to and from Dnipro International Airport:

As of 24 February 2022, all passenger flights have been suspended indefinitely.

Airlines	Destinations
Ukraine International Airlines	Kyiv–Boryspil, Tel Aviv
Windrose Airlines	Kyiv–Boryspil; Seasonal charter: Sharm el-Sheikh

== Statistics ==
Year	Passengers	Change on previous year
2010	341,430	▲2.5%
2011	426,532	▼5.8%
2012	444,150	▲4.2%
2013	454,981	▲2.4%
2014	446,798	▼1.8%
2015	346,014	▼22.5%
2016	284,914	▼18.0%
2017	276,954	▼2.8%
2018	299,250	▲8.1%
2019	136,691	▼59.7%
2020	267,829	▲95.9%

== See also ==
- List of airports in Ukraine
- List of the busiest airports in Ukraine
- List of the busiest airports in Europe
- List of the busiest airports in the former USSR

== Incidents and accidents ==
- On 5 April 2025, five Windrose Airlines aircraft (one Airbus A320-200, two Airbus A321-200 and two ATR 72-600) were destroyed after a Russian Geran-2 strike hit the airport maintenance hangar in the Russo-Ukrainian War. There were no reported fatalities.
