= List of airlines of Ukraine =

Ukraine has numerous affiliated airlines registered by ICAO.

== Scheduled airlines ==
Airline	Image	IATA	ICAO	Callsign	Commenced operation	Hub airport(s)	Notes

== Charter airlines ==
Airline	Image	IATA	ICAO	Callsign	Commenced operation	Hub airport(s)	Notes
Air Urga		3N	URG	URGA	1993	Kropyvnytskyi; Kryvyi Rih	
Constanta Airline			UZA	CONSTANTA	1998	Zaporizhzhia	
Skyline Express		QU	UTN	UT-UKRAINE	2009	Kyiv–Boryspil	
SkyUp Airlines		PQ	SQP	SKYUP	2018	Chișinău	Operated both scheduled and charter flights until 2022. Operates ACMI/Leased flights, and scheduled flights through subsidiaries SkyUp MT and SkyUp Nistru.
Ukraine Air Enterprise			UKN	ENTERPRISE UKRAINE	1996	Kyiv–Boryspil	
Windrose Airlines		7W	WRC	WIND ROSE	2007	Kyiv–Boryspil	
Yanair		YE	ANR	YANAIR	2012	Kyiv–Zhuliany	

== Cargo airlines ==
Airline	Image	IATA	ICAO	Callsign	Commenced operation	Hub airport(s)	Notes
Antonov Airlines			ADB	ANTONOV BUREAU	1989	Hostomel	
Cavok Air			CVK	CargoLine	2011		
Motor Sich Airlines		M9	MSI	MOTOR SICH	1984		
Ukraine Air Alliance			UKL	UKRAINE ALLIANCE	1992	Kyiv–Boryspil; Kyiv–Zhuliany	AOC revoked in 2019 due to crash and renewed in 2020
Supernova Airlines					2023		Operated from Rzeszów–Jasionka Airport in Poland
ZetAvia			ZAV	ZETAVIA	2009	Sharjah	Originally based in Mykolaiv, now nominally based in the United Arab Emirates.

== See also ==
- List of defunct airlines of Ukraine
- List of airports in Ukraine
- List of airlines of Europe
- List of defunct airlines of Europe
