= List of defunct airlines of Ukraine =

This is a list of defunct airlines of Ukraine.

Airline	Image	IATA	ICAO	Callsign	Commenced operations	Ceased operations	Notes
AAR Airlines					1998	2000	
Aero Charter		DW	UCR	CHARTER UKRAINE	1997	2014	
Aerostar Airlines			UAR	AEROSTAR	1997	Kyiv–Zhuliany	
Aerosvit Ukrainian Airlines		VV	AEW	AEROSVIT	1994	2013	Went bankrupt
Aeromist-Kharkiv		HT	AHW	AEROMIST	2002	2007	
Aeroservice Cargo					1998	1999	
Aerotrans					1997	2001	
Aerovis Airlines		V6	VIZ	AEROVIZ	2003		
Air Kharkiv			KHV		1998	1999	
Air Kirovograd			KAD		1998	2003	Renamed/merged to Kirovohradavia
Air Ocean Airlines			AOA		2021	2022	
Air Onix		OG	ONX	ONIXAIR	2007	2013	
Air Service Ukraine		CH	ASG		1991	1998	Renamed/merged to Ukraine Airservice Airlines
Air Sirin					2003		
Air Ukraine		6U	UKR	AIR UKRAINE	1991	2004	Went bankrupt in 2002, AOC revoked in 2004
Albatros Avia			ABS		2007	2009	
Anda Air					2006	2021	
Antanik-Air						1997	
Antonov Airtrack			UAP		1994	1998	
ARP 410 Airlines			URP	AIR-ARP	1999	2007	
Artem-Avia			ABA		1970	2006	
ATI Aircompany			TII		1996	2002	
Atlant-SV Aircompany		L4	ATG		1992	1998	
AtlasGlobal Ukraine		UH	UJX	ATLAS UKRAINE	2013	2019	
Atlasjet Ukraine		UH	UJX		2013	2015	Rebranded as AtlasGlobal Ukraine
Aviatrans Kiev		KI	DAT	TRANS KIEV	2000	2014	
Azov Avia Airlines			AZV	AZOV AVIA	1996	2004	
Azur Air Ukraine					2015	2023	Rebranded to Skyline Express
Baltika			BTK		2005	2008	
Bees Airline		7B	UBE	FLOWER BEE	2021	2022	AOC revoked due to no aircraft
Bravo Airways			BAY	BRAVO	2012	2024	Ended operations in 2021, and its trademark and intellectual property were auctioned in January 2022. Declared bankruptcy and liquidated in 2024.
BSL Airlines			BSL		1993	2001	
Bukovyna Airlines		BQ	BKV	BUKOVYNA	1999	2021	
Business Aviation Center		UQ	BCV	BUSINESS AVIATION	1996	2013	
Busol Airlines			BUA		1992	1998	
Centre			BUA		1997	1999	
Challenge Aero			CHG	SKY CHALLENGER	2002		
Columbus-Avia			CBS		1992		
Comandor Avia					1995	1996	
Crimea Air		OR	CRF		1996	2007	Liquidated
DART Ukrainian Airlines		D4	DAT		1997	2018	Shut down due to US sanctions
Dniproavia		Z6	UDN	DNIEPRO	1992	2017	Went bankrupt
Donbassaero		7D	UDC	DONBASS AERO	2003	2013	Went bankrupt
Donbass Airlines		5D	UDD		1995	2002	
Donbass-Eastern Ukrainian Airlines		7D	UDC		1999	2003	Rebranded as Donbassaero
Donetsk Aviation Enterprise					1992	1998	Renamed/merged to Donbass-Eastern Ukrainian Airlines
Eleron Airlines			VVA	LOAD SHARK	2017	2022	
Euroline							Georgian based airline
GATS Airlines			GTS		1994	2005	
ICAR Airlines					1993	2002	
Illich-Avia			ILL	ILLICHAVIA	2002	2014	
Jonika Airlines		JO	JNK	JONIKA	2018	2022	
Kharkiv Airlines		KT	KHK	KHARKIV	2013	2015	
Khors Air		KO	KHO	AIRCOMPANY KHORS	1991	2022	
Kirovohradavia			KAD		1992	2007	
Kroonk Airlines			KRO		1993	2004	
Liana					1994	1997	
Lugansk Airlines		L7	LHS	ENTERPRISE LUHANSK	1992	2010	Went bankrupt
Lviv Airlines		5V	UKW	UKRAINE WEST	1992	2011	Liquidated
Mars RK		6V	MRW	AVIAMARS	2001	2018	
Odessa Airlines		5K	ODS	ODESSA AIR	1996	2006	
Rivne Universal Avia			UNR	RIVNE UNIVERSAL			
Sevastopol-Avia			SVL		2001	2007	
South Airlines		YG	OTL	SOUTHLINE	2001	2013	AOC revoked following crash
Tavrey Airlines		T6	TVR	TAVREY	1995	2008	
TransAGO					1995	1998	
Ukrainian Cargo Airways		6Z	UKS	CARGOTRANS	1997	2009	Shut down due to safety concerns
Ukraine International Airlines		PS	AUI	UKRAINE INTERNATIONAL	1992	2023	Suspended operations in 2022. The trademark was auctioned, and declared bankruptcy in 2023. Several aircraft seized by Ukrainian tax authorities in 2024.
Ukrvozdukhput					1923	1929	Absorbed into Dobrolyot
Ukrainian-Mediterranean Airlines		UF	UKM	UKRAINE MEDITERRANEE	1998	2018	
UNA					1991	1999	
UTair-Ukraine					2008	2015	Rebranded as Azur Air Ukraine
Veteran Airlines			VPB		1992	2009	
Volare Airlines		F7	VRE	UKRAINE VOLARE	1994	2009	Shut down due to safety concerns
Wizz Air Ukraine		WU	WAU	WIZZAIR UKRAINE	2008	2015	Shut down
Yuzhmashavia		2N	UMK	YUZMASH	1983	2021	

== See also ==
- List of airlines of Ukraine
- List of airports in Ukraine
