= Kharkov (disambiguation) =

Kharkov, the Russian name for Kharkiv, is a city in Ukraine.

Kharkov may also refer to:

== Battles ==
- First Battle of Kharkov (1941), a German offensive in World War II
- Second Battle of Kharkov (1942), a German counteroffensive in World War II
- Third Battle of Kharkov (1943), a German offensive in World War II
- Belgorod–Kharkov offensive operation, also known as Fourth Battle of Kharkov, 1943

== People ==
- Catherine Karkov, medieval academic
- Sergey Kharkov (born 1970), a Soviet and Russian gymnast

== Other uses ==
- Soviet destroyer Kharkov (sunk 1943)
- Kharkov: The Soviet Spring Offensive, a 1978 board wargame simulating the Second Battle of Kharkov
- Air Kharkov, a defunct Ukrainian airline
- Kharkov Governorate, a governorate of the Russian Empire
- The former name of Norshen, Shirak, Armenia

== See also ==
- Kharkiv (disambiguation), uses of Kharkiv which in some cases may be substituted for Kharkov
- Kharkiv Operation (disambiguation)
- Battle of Kharkiv (disambiguation)
  - Battle of Kharkov, various World War II battles
