= Battle of Kharkiv =

Battle of Kharkiv (or Kharkov) may refer to:

- Kharkiv Operation (June 1919)
- Battle of Kharkov, four battles in World War II
  - First Battle of Kharkov, an October 1941 battle
  - Second Battle of Kharkov, a May 1942 battle
  - Third Battle of Kharkov, a February 1943 battle
  - Belgorod–Kharkov offensive operation (also known as Fourth Battle of Kharkov), an August 1943 battle
- Battle of Kharkiv (2022), starting in February during the Russian invasion of Ukraine
  - 2022 Kharkiv counteroffensive, a Ukrainian counteroffensive starting in September 2022
- 2024 Kharkiv offensive, a Russian offensive beginning in May 2024

== See also ==
- Kharkiv Operation (disambiguation)
- Occupation of Kharkiv (disambiguation)
- Kharkiv (disambiguation)
- Kharkov (disambiguation)
