= SkyUp Airlines =

Low-cost airline of Ukraine

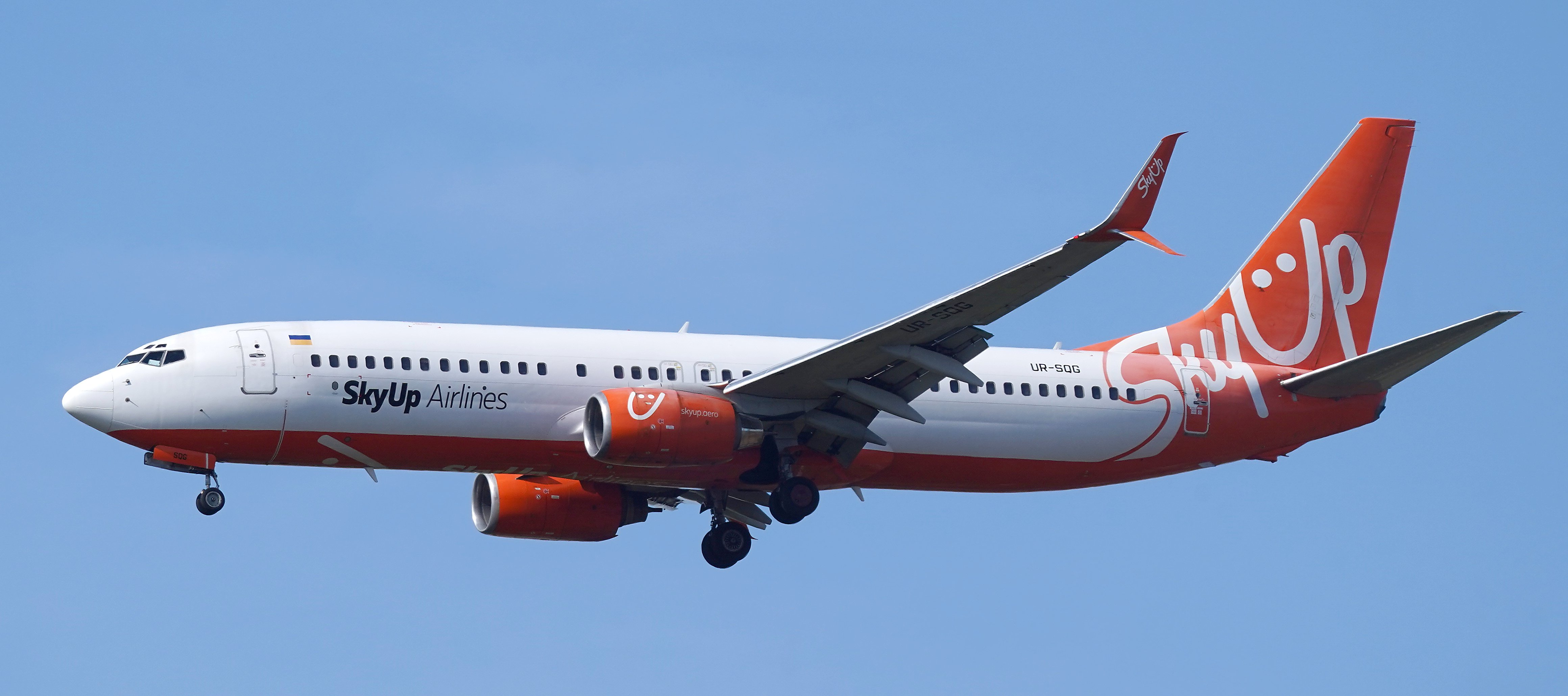
- A SkyUp Airlines Boeing 737-800
IATA	ICAO	Call sign
PQ	SQP	SKYUP
- Founded: 2016
- Commenced operations: 21 May 2018
- Operating bases: Chișinău
- Subsidiaries: SkyUp MT; SkyUp Nistru
- Fleet size: 2
- Destinations: 116
- Headquarters: Kyiv, Ukraine
- Operating income: ▼ ₴ 3.8 billion (2025)
- Profit: ▼ ₴ 26.4 million (2025)
- Total assets: ▲ ₴ 5.2 billion (2025)
- Total equity: ▲ ₴ 1.4 billion (2025)
- Employees: 1,005 (2025)
- Website: skyup.aero

SkyUp Airlines LLC is a Ukrainian charter and low-cost airline headquartered in Kyiv, which began its operation in May 2018. During 2021, the airline carried 2,546,899 passengers, performed 15,962 flights, and transported 786.5 tons of cargo. It had 1172 employees as of 2021. Since the Russo-Ukrainian War the airline has specialized in leasing and also offers scheduled flights from Chișinău and Poland.

Its subsidiary SkyUp MT is based in Malta and has the IATA Code U5. This airline received its air operator license in May 2023 and has performed ACMI operations since summer 2023.

== History ==
In 2016, SkyUp became a registered company in Kyiv, Ukraine. On 14 December 2017, Minister of Infrastructure Volodymyr Omelyan announced the launch of a new national private air carrier named SkyUp Airlines. The main shareholders of the company were ACS-Ukraine Ltd, Yuri Alba and Tatyana Alba, who also owned the tour operator Join UP!, which was expected to cooperate with the airline to provide charter flights for holiday packages.

Plans for the first year included concentrating on international charter flights to popular summer destinations, as well as scheduled flights within Ukraine and to several international destinations. Tickets sales were set to begin in April 2018. SkyUp also intends to cooperate with Ukraine International Airlines.

The company started operations on 21 May 2018 with a flight from Kyiv-Zhuliany to Sharm El Sheikh. In March 2018, SkyUp Airlines and Boeing finalised a firm order for the purchase of two Boeing 737 8 MAX and three Boeing 737 MAX 10 due to be delivered in 2023. Additionally, the airline has the option to purchase another five aircraft. At its launch, the airline intended to operate charter flights from both Kyiv-Boryspil and Kyiv-Zhuliany, as well as Kharkiv, Lviv, Odesa and other cities in Ukraine to a total of sixteen destinations: Alicante, Antalya, Barcelona, Bodrum, Burgas, Dalaman, Dubai, Hurghada, Larnaca, Palma de Mallorca, Nice, Rimini, Sharm El Sheikh, Tenerife, Tivat, Tel Aviv and Varna. Following the launch of the charter operations, the airline planned to commence domestic services from Odesa to Kyiv, Kharkiv and Lviv in late May or early June 2018. The airline also intended to operate international services from Kyiv to Barcelona, Dubai and Larnaca.

In February 2019, the airline announced it would be moving its main base from the Zhuliany to Boryspil from the beginning of the summer schedule. The airline said that the decision to change the home airport was made due to restrictions on the operation of aircraft at Zhuliany Airport. Also, in 2019, SkyUp was hit by court attack with controversial guilty verdicts resulted in their license being suspended. However, journalists revealed that the woman, who allegedly appealed to the court, said she had never been SkyUp’s client and did not appeal to the court. The Prime Minister of Ukraine, as well as Minister of Infrastructure called the court attack suspicious. Later, guilty verdicts and license suspension were recalled, while the judge, responsible for the illegal verdict, was dismissed.

On 20 February 2020, one of the airline's planes was chartered by the Ukrainian government to evacuate citizens from Wuhan during the COVID-19 pandemic, which was back then not a pandemic.

In 2021, SkyUp became the first Ukrainian airline to launch direct flights from Saudi Arabia to Ukraine.

In October 2021, a new uniform for flight attendants was introduced: high-heeled shoes were replaced by sneakers, and trouser suits instead of skirts.

SkyUp Airlines won the Heart of Airspace nomination according to the Ukraine Tourism Awards 2021.

On 24 February 2022, coinciding with the closure of Ukrainian airspace to civil aviation traffic, SkyUp canceled all flights through 6 March 2022. Since the beginning of the Russian invasion, the airline has been conducting evacuation and humanitarian flights, as well as providing wet leasing for its fleet.

In May 2023, SkyUp announced the formation of a new company based in Malta named SkyUp MT, and a Boeing 737-800 registered 9H-SAU was transferred to it. They announced that it would perform wet-leasing flights with the hope that scheduled services within Europe could eventually be operated. The airline has an ICAO code of SEU with a callsign of Sky Malta.

In December 2023, one of SkyUp's Boeing 737s was wet leased to Air Niugini.

On 12 December 2024, SkyUp announced that in 2025 they would start scheduled flights from Chișinău to Alicante, Athens, Barcelona, Heraklion, Larnaca, Lisbon, Nice, Palma de Mallorca, Paris and Thessaloniki.

In May 2026, SkyUp Airlines retired its last Boeing 737-700 in service. However, one aircraft remains in service with its Moldovan subsidiary SkyUp Nistru.

== Destinations ==
As of October 2021, SkyUp serves 64 scheduled year-round and seasonal destinations from airports in Ukraine, some of which are operated as charters. The airline mainly serves routes throughout Europe and the Middle East.

== Fleet ==
As of June 2026, SkyUp Airlines operates an all-Boeing 737 fleet composed of the following aircraft:

=== Active fleet ===
Aircraft	In service	Orders	Passengers	Notes
SkyUp Airlines
Boeing 737-800	2	—	189	
Boeing 737 MAX 8	—	2	TBA	
Boeing 737 MAX 10	—	3	TBA	
Total	2	5		

Aircraft operating for the subsidiary airlines SkyUp MT and SkyUp Nistru are listed separately.

=== Fleet history ===
All the aircraft ever operated by SkyUp Airlines:

Aircraft	Total	Introduced	Retired	Notes
Boeing 737-700	2	2018	2026	One aircraft transferred to SkyUp Nistru.
Boeing 737-900ER	4	2019	2021	Leased from GE Capital Aviation Services / AerCap.
Airbus A321neo	3	2025	2025	Leased from Play Europe.

=== Gallery ===
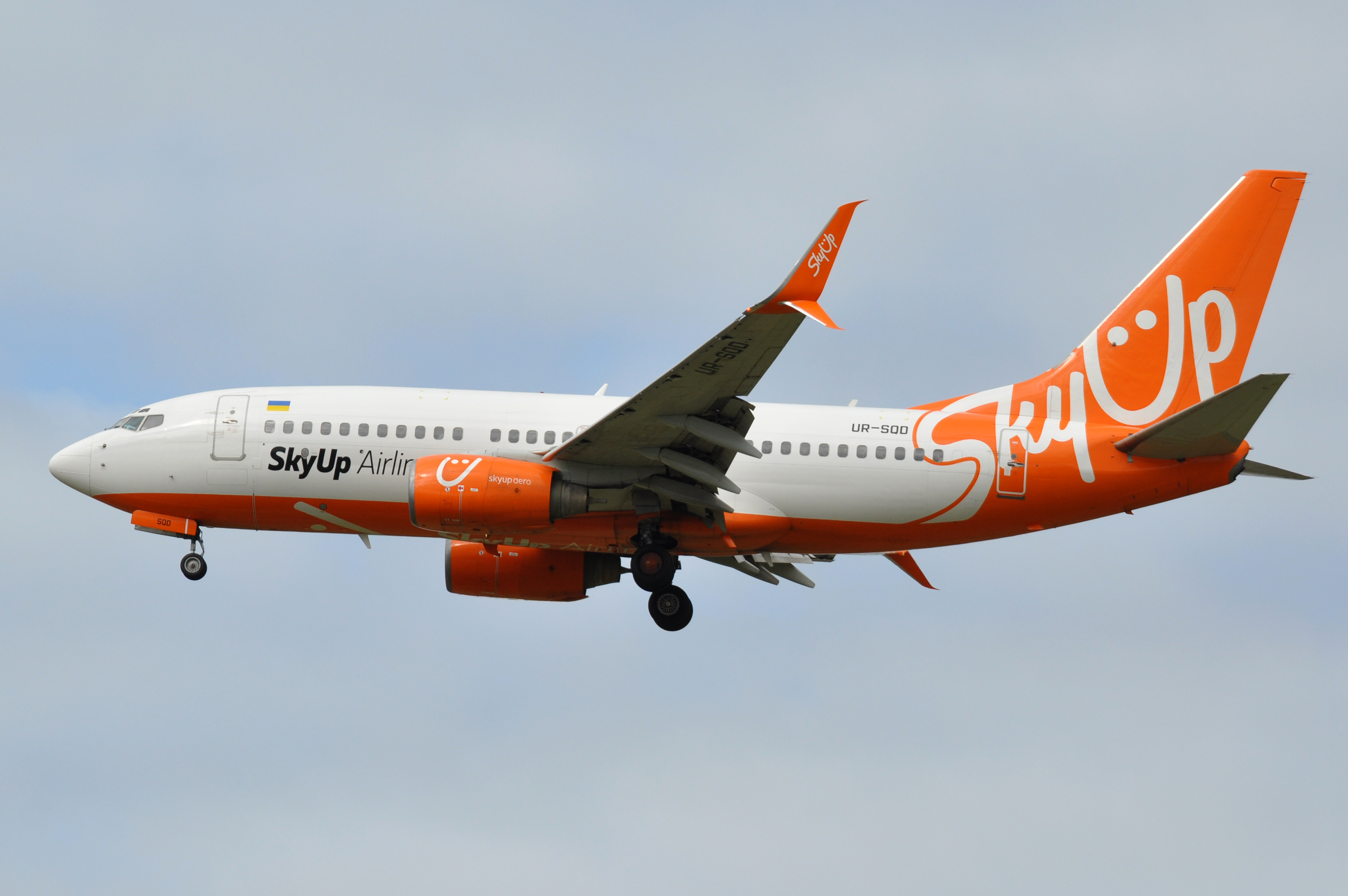
Boeing 737-700

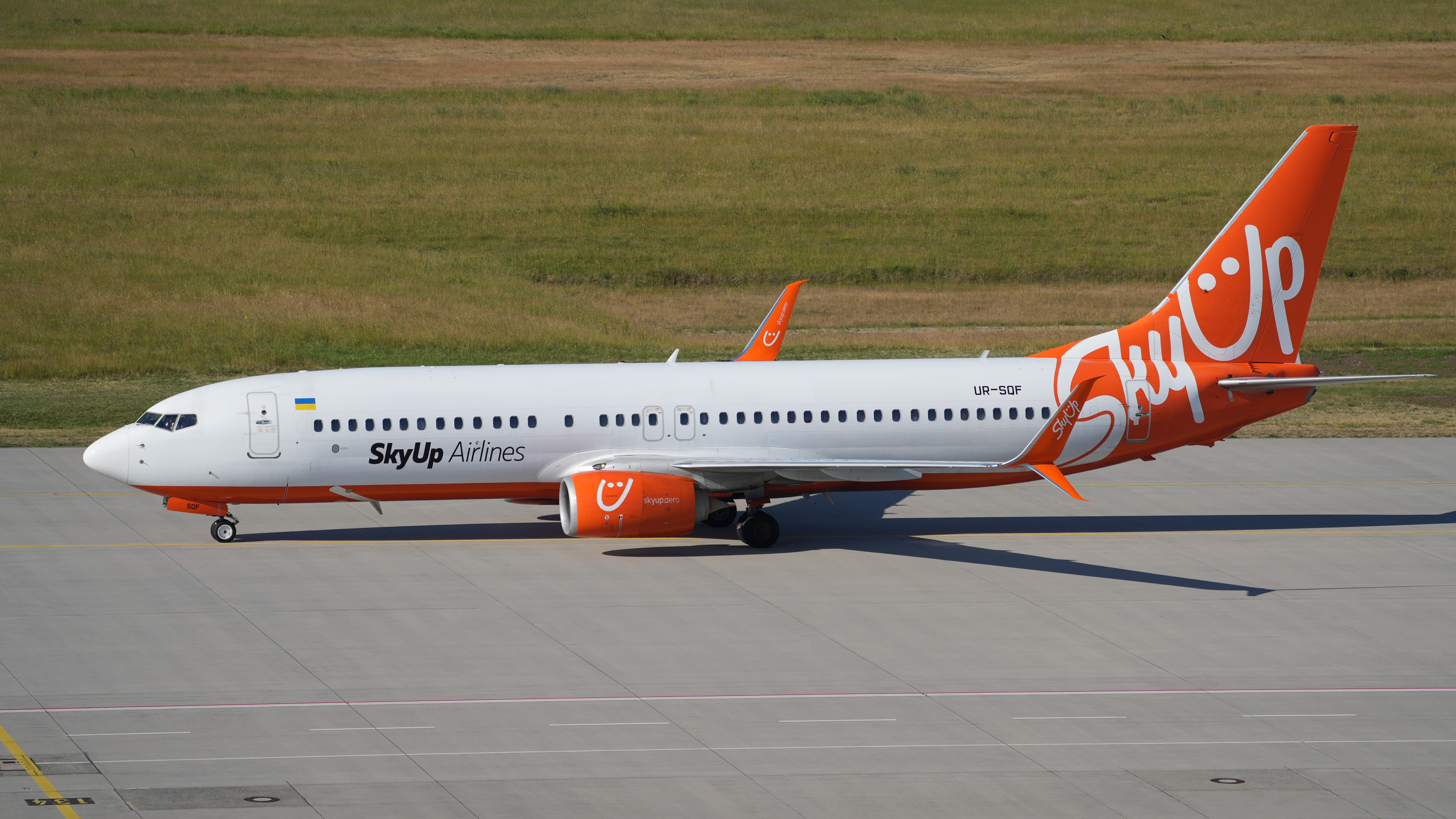
Boeing 737-800

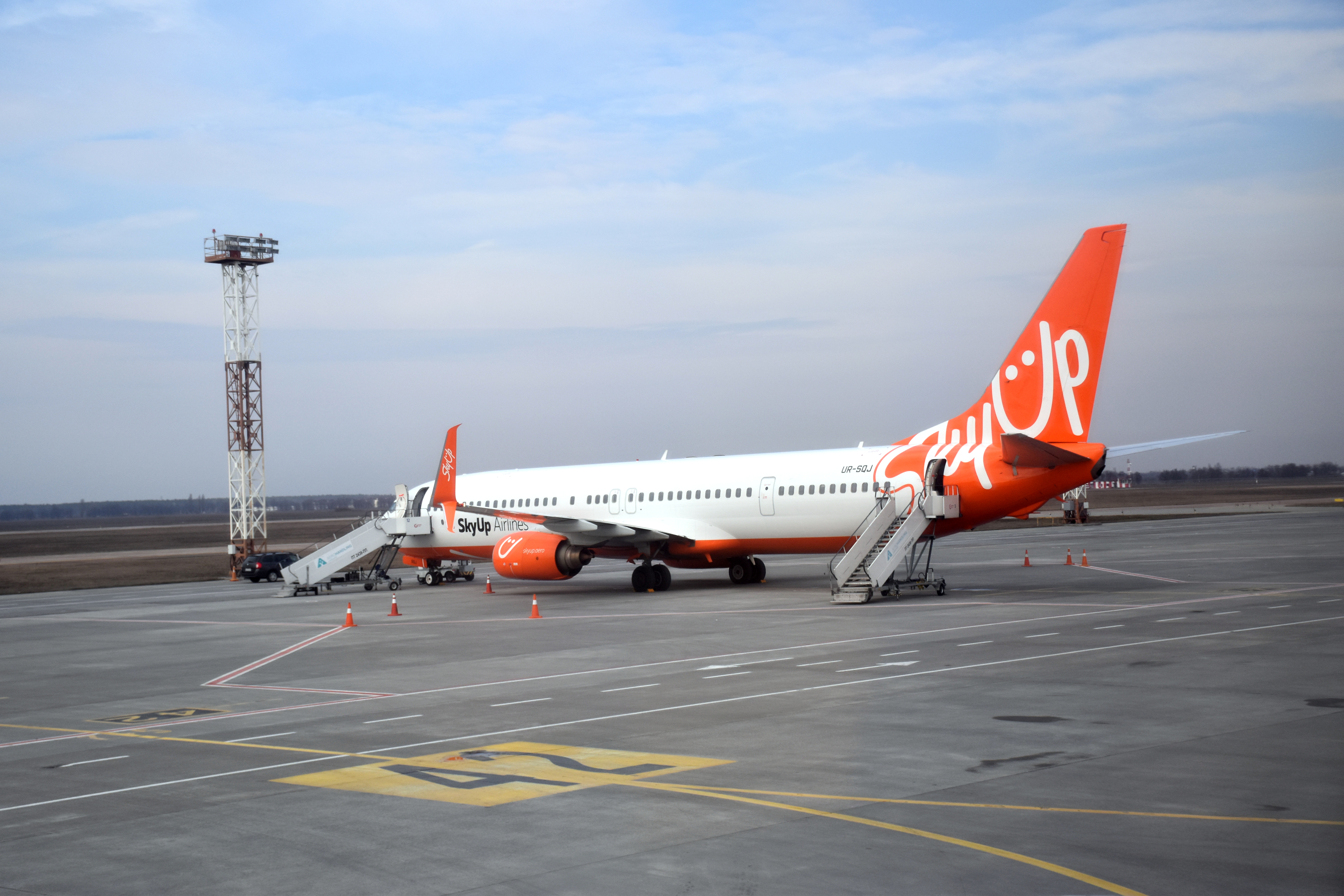
Boeing 737-900ER

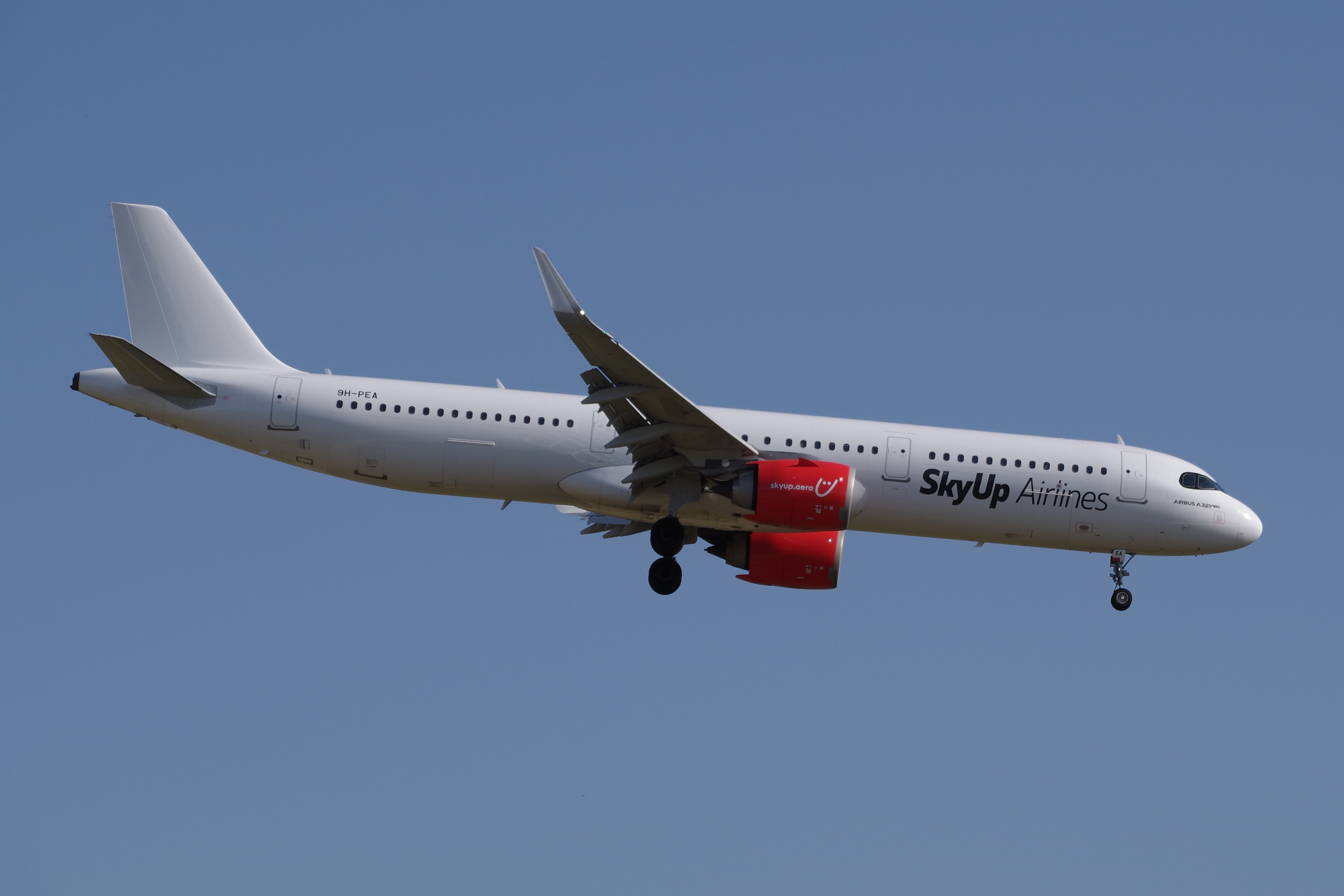
Airbus A321neo

== Incidents and accidents ==
- On 9 November 2019, a SkyUp Airlines Boeing 737-800, registration UR-SQH operating flight PQ7153, suffered a hydraulic fluid leak after landing at Sharm El Sheikh after a flight from Zaporizhzhia. The fluid leaked on to the still hot brakes, starting a fire, which was extinguished after airport staff arrived with fire extinguishers.
- On 15 April 2023, two SkyUp Airlines Boeing 737-800 registered UR-SQA and UR-SQH operating for Sun Air were destroyed at Khartoum International Airport, Sudan during fighting between government forces and the Rapid Support Forces in the 2023 Sudan clashes. There were no reported fatalities.
- On 3 January 2024, a SkyUp Airlines Boeing 737-800 reported loss of cabin pressure at cruise altitude, and made an emergency landing in Warsaw. There were no injuries.

== Controversies ==
=== Transfer of former aircraft to Belavia ===
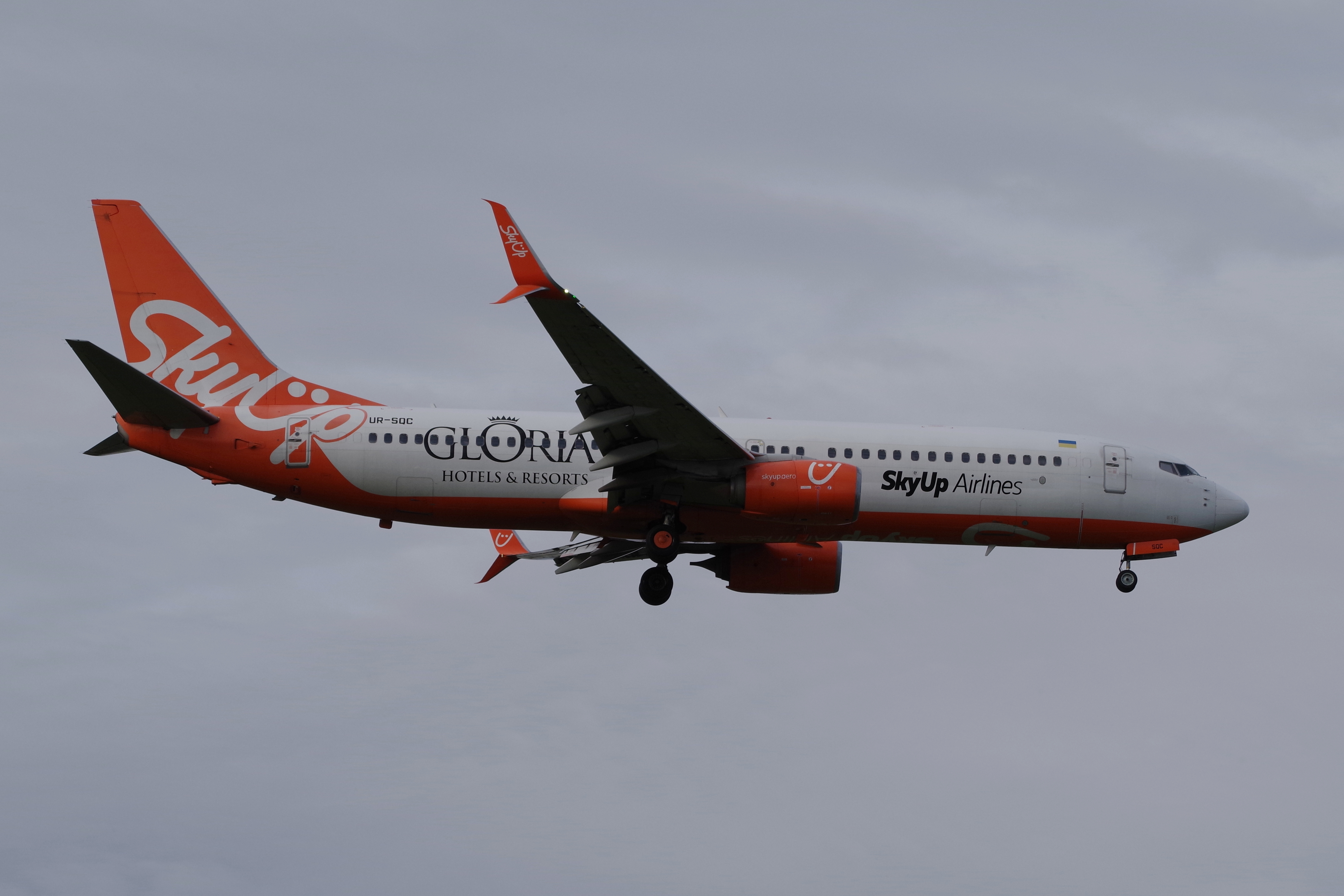
A former SkyUp Airlines Boeing 737-800, operating for Belavia since June 2026

In June 2026, three former SkyUp Airlines Boeing 737-800 were transferred to the Belarusian national airline Belavia under temporary Gambian registrations. The delivery followed the companies previous acquisition of three Airbus A330-200 aircraft through the West African nation to sidestep sanctions. Earlier in 2022, SkyUp Airlines had stated that it was willing to lease its aircraft to any airline in the world which does not operate flights to Russia or Belarus.

In a comment to Radio Free Europe/Radio Liberty, SkyUp Airlines confirmed that the transfer had taken place, but that it was out of their control, as the aircraft had been returned to their lessor.

We decommissioned them and returned the aircraft to the lessor in January 2026. After returning them, we had nothing to do with their future fate. The transfer of the planes to the lessor was carried out in the United Arab Emirates. Therefore, it is incorrect to say that these were our planes, rather that they were Boeing 737-800s, which until January 2026 were in the fleet of SkyUp Airlines.

— SkyUp Airlines representative

In its biannual report published on 6 August 2026, Belavia confirmed that it had taken delivery of the three Boeing 737-800 aircraft, allowing to the airline to increase its carrying capacity, develop its route network further, and provide greater ease of scheduling.

== In popular culture ==
The aircraft and uniform of SkyUp flight attendants appear in Max Barskih’s video "Just Fly".

== See also ==
- List of airlines of Ukraine
