= Ilyushin Il-78 =

Soviet/Russian aerial refueling tanker

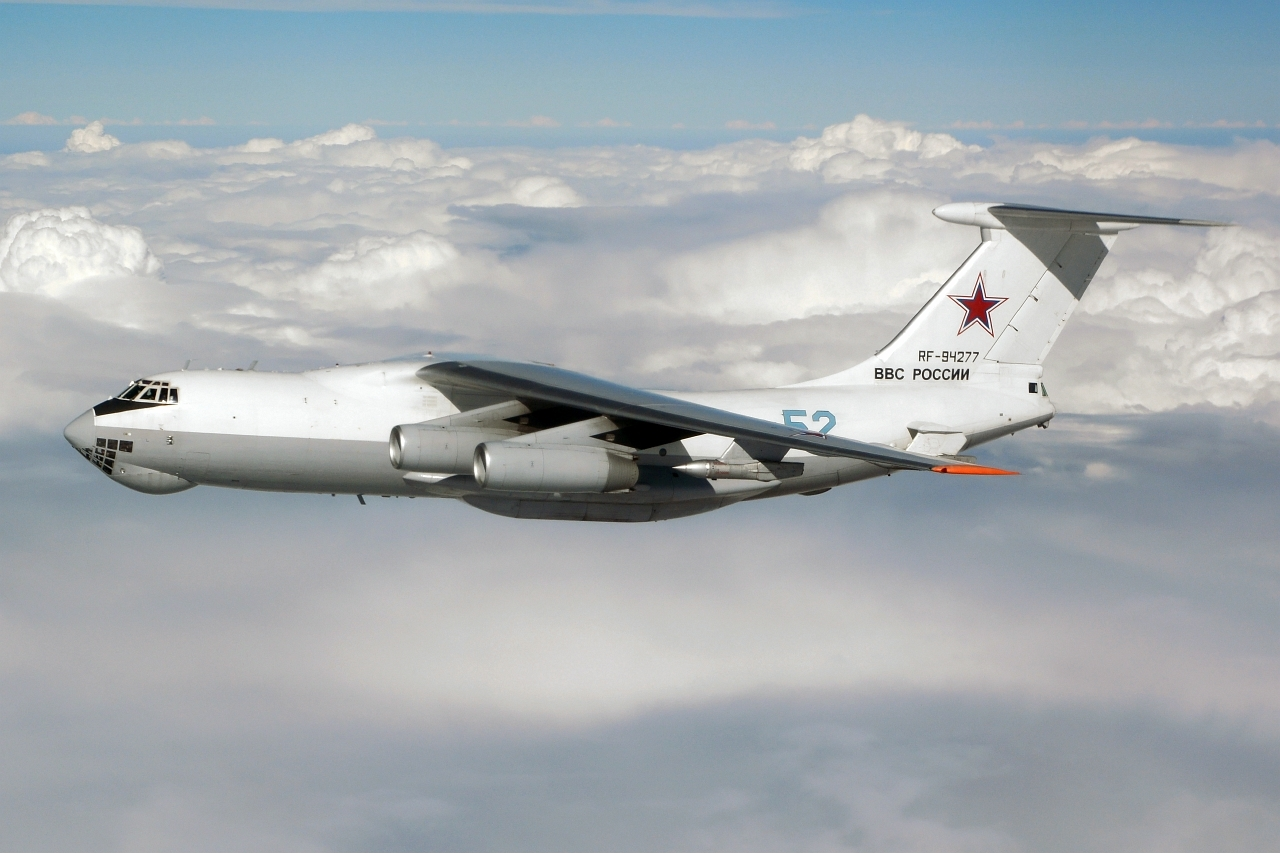
- An Il-78M of the Russian Air Force

General information
- Type: Aerial refueling tanker
- National origin: Soviet Union; Russia
- Manufacturer: Ilyushin
- Status: In service and production
- Primary users: Soviet Air Forces (historical) Russian Aerospace Forces; Ukrainian Air Force (historical); Indian Air Force; Pakistan Air Force
- Number built: 53

History
- Manufactured: 1984–present
- Introduction date: 1984 (Il-78)
- First flight: 26 June 1983
- Developed from: Ilyushin Il-76

The Ilyushin Il-78 (Russian: Илью́шин Ил-78; NATO reporting name Midas) is a Soviet/Russian four-engined aerial refueling tanker based on the Il-76 strategic airlifter.

== Design and development ==
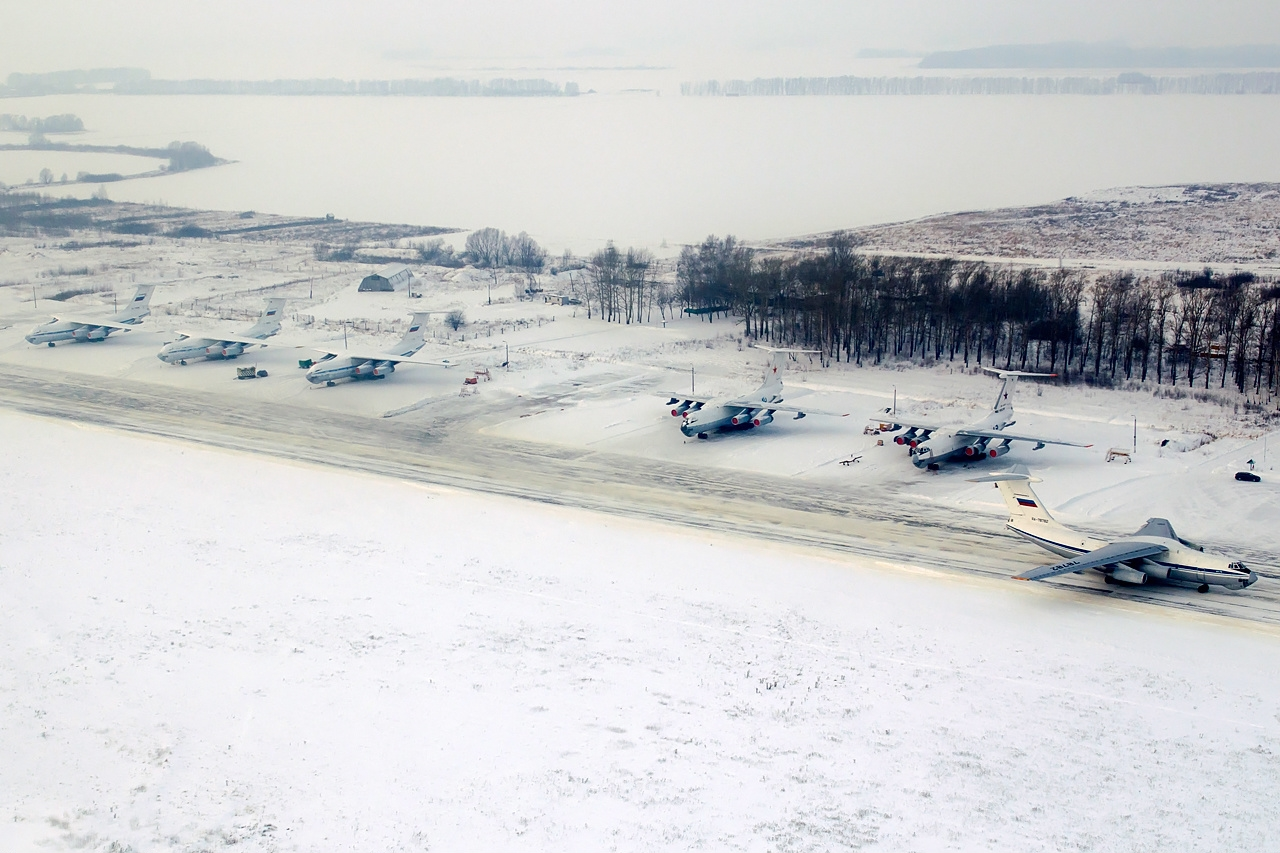
Il-78s from 203rd Guards Air Refuelling Regiment

The Soviet Union's first dedicated tanker aircraft were variants of preexisting bombers, like the Tupolev Tu-16 and Myasishchev M-4. Their performance was deemed insufficient, especially so since new bomber models were slated to enter service (the Tupolev Tu-22M and the Tupolev Tu-160). In 1968, the development of a new tanker began, based on the Ilyushin Il-76. Its performance was insufficient for use as a tanker: it could only transfer less than 10 tonnes of fuel to other aircraft. Instead of the basic Il-76, the improved Il-76MD version was chosen as the basis for the new tanker, named Il-78, owing to its higher fuel capacity. The Il-78 tanker was developed and designed in the Ilyushin Aviation Complex in the Soviet Union. The Il-78 made its first flight on 26 June 1983, and entered service in June 1987. Meanwhile, work on a version with a higher fuel capacity began. This version, the Il-78M, first flew on 7 March 1987. In total, 32 Il-78s, 13 Il-78Ms and a single Il-78E (a version exported to Libya) were built at the Tashkent Aviation Production Association, from 1984 to 1993.

Taking the Il-76MD as its basis, the Il-78 airframe retains its general configuration. The tail turret is removed, and an air refuelling operator is situated in the rear gunner's position. Three aerial refueling pods are added: one under each wing, and one fixed to the rear fuselage. The basic Il-78 use three UPAZ-1 pods, while the Il-78M uses two UPAZ-1s under the wings, and one UPAZ-1M on the rear fuselage (the UPAZ-1M has a superior fuel transfer rate). The underwing pods are used to refuel tactical aircraft, while the fuselage pod is used for heavier aircraft. The Il-78 uses the probe-and-drogue refueling method. The Il-78 can transfer fuel from its internal tanks, and two removable tanks located in the cargo hold. The Il-78M has three fixed tanks in its cargo hold. The basic Il-78 can transfer a maximum of 57.7 tonnes of fuel (internal tanks only) or 85.7 tonnes with the additional tanks, while the Il-78M can transfer 105.7 tonnes.

== Variants ==
Il-78
Original production version based on the Il-76MD. With the additional fuel tanks removed, the Il-78 can serve as a regular cargo aircraft.
Il-78M
The Il-78M entered service in 1987 as a dedicated tanker equipped with three permanent fuselage tanks, a higher gross weight of 210 tonnes, and no cargo door or cargo handling equipment. The cargo ramp is retained but non-functional. Total fuel capacity is 138 tonnes (303,600 lb), of which 105.7 tonnes (232,540 lb) is transferable.
Il-78-2
Modernization of Il-78/78M aircraft, using same parts as used in newly produced Il-78M-90A and Il-76MD-90A variants, to enhance service life from 30 to 40 years. The cockpit equipment is modernised, and flare launchers are installed. The aircraft have three UPAZ-1M air refuelling pods. The first modernized aircraft was rolled out on 25 August 2019.

Il-78E

Export version of the Il-78. One example built for Libya.
Il-78MKI
Export version for India. Six aircraft were ordered in 2002, built at the Tashkent Aviation Production Association plant using unfinished airframes. Uses Cobham Mk.32B air refuelling pods, which allow to refuel both Russian-built and Western aircraft.
Il-78MP
Multi-role aerial refuelling tanker/transport aircraft, with removable fuel tanks in cargo hold and three UPAZ-1 refuelling pods, for the Pakistan Air Force.
Il-78M-90A (Il-478)
An upgraded variant based on the Il-76MD-90A. First prototype was rolled out on 29 November 2017, and performed its maiden flight on 25 January 2018. On December 12, 2020, an order for 10 Il-78M-90As was signed, with the serial production starting in 2021. Export version Il-78MK-90A is marketed by Rosoboronexport.

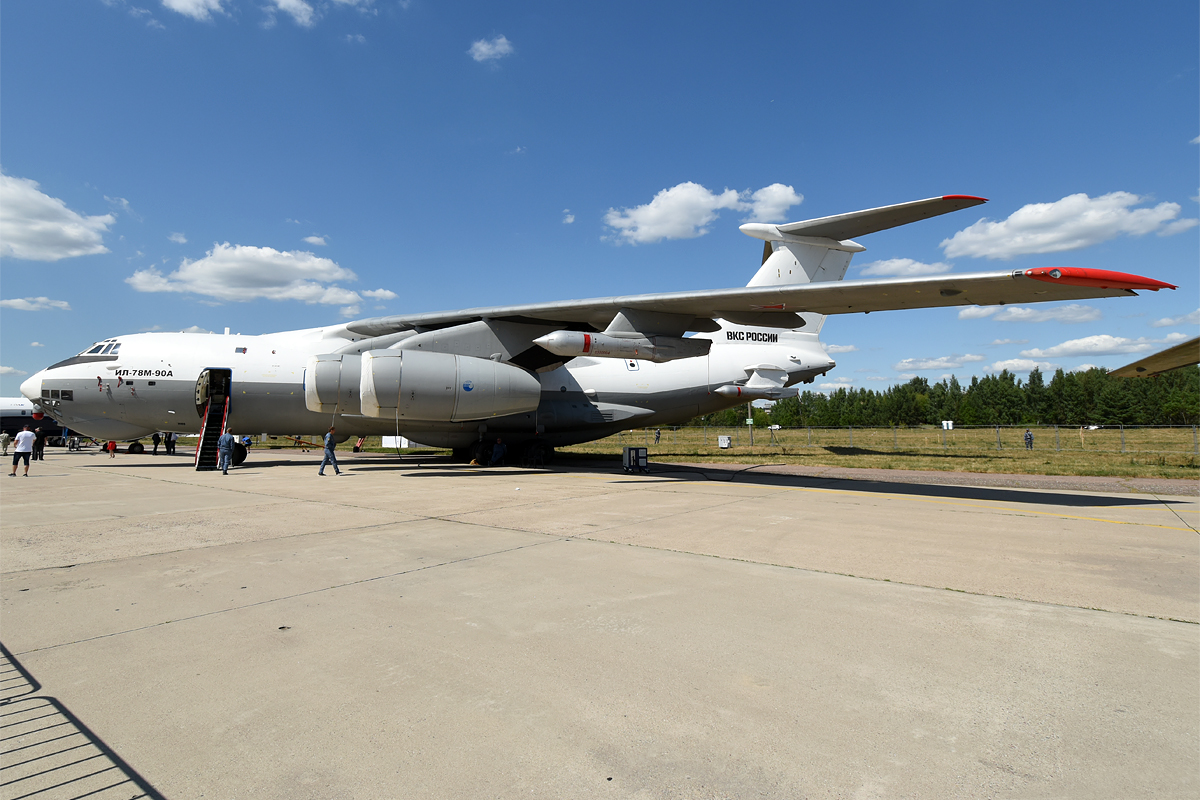
The latest Il-78M-90A.

=== Refueling capability ===
Transferable fuel load in tonnes
Distance	Il-78	Il-78M
1000 km	42	74
2000 km	24	56
3000 km	15	40

== Operators ==
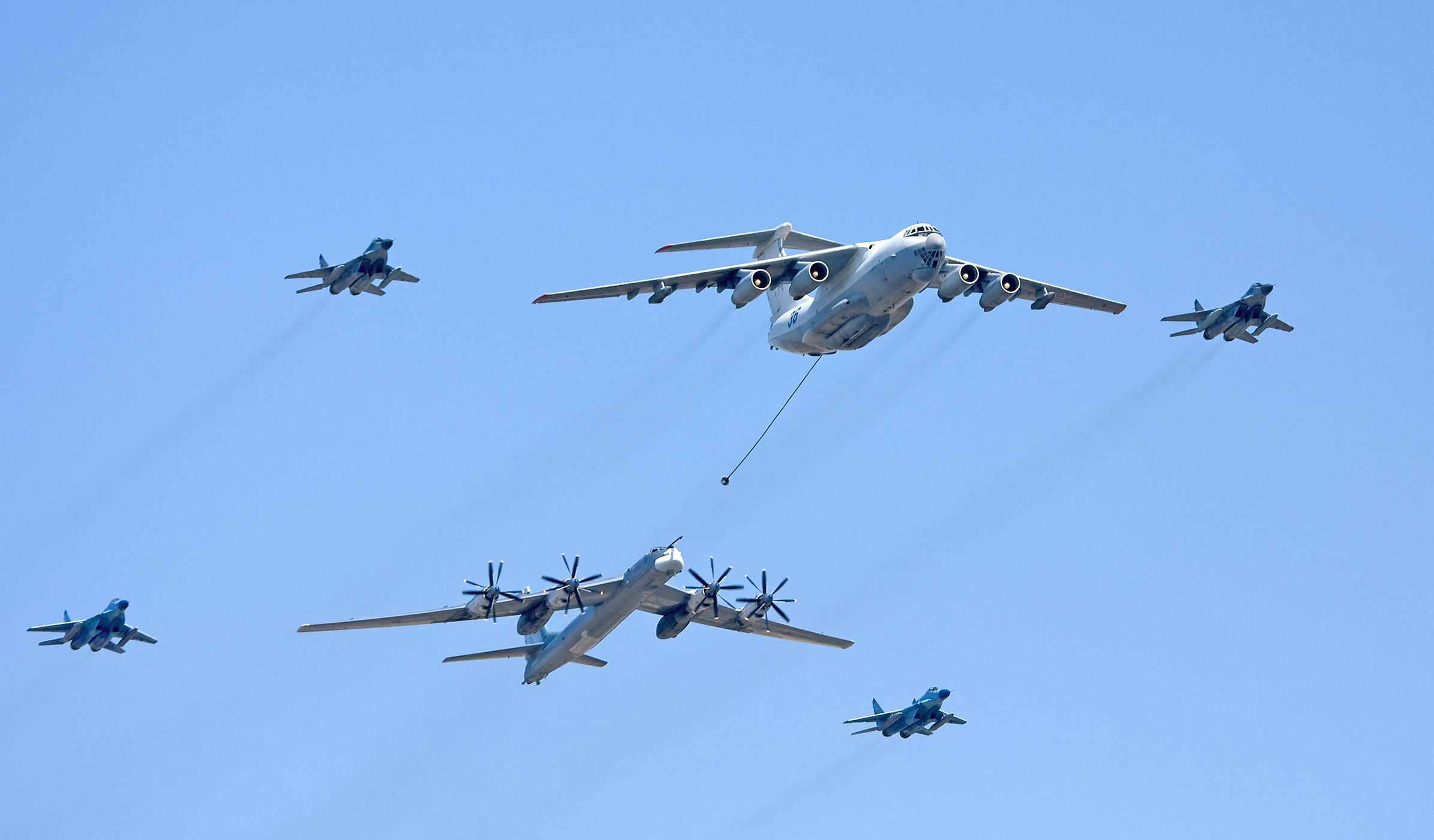
An Ilyushin Il-78 simulating aerial refuelling with a Tu-95MS during the Victory Day Parade in Moscow on 9 May 2009

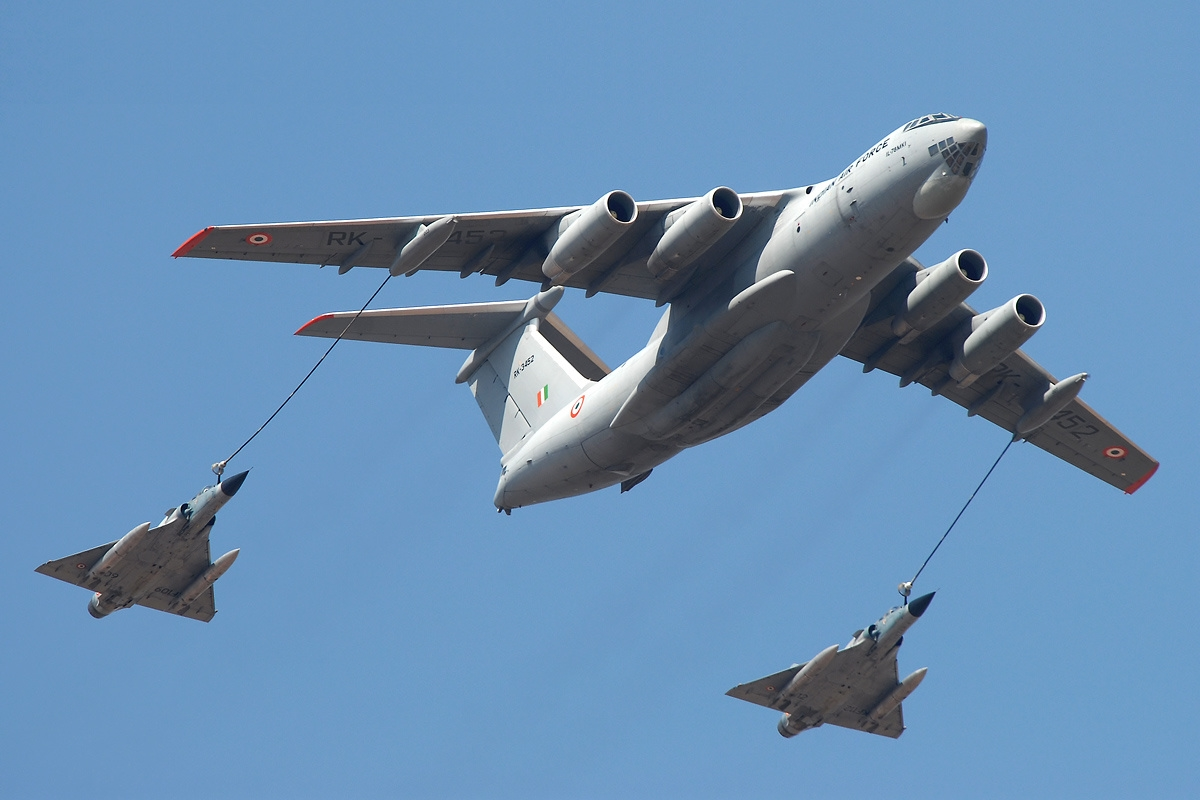
IAF Ilyushin Il-78 providing mid-air refueling to two Mirage 2000 fighter planes

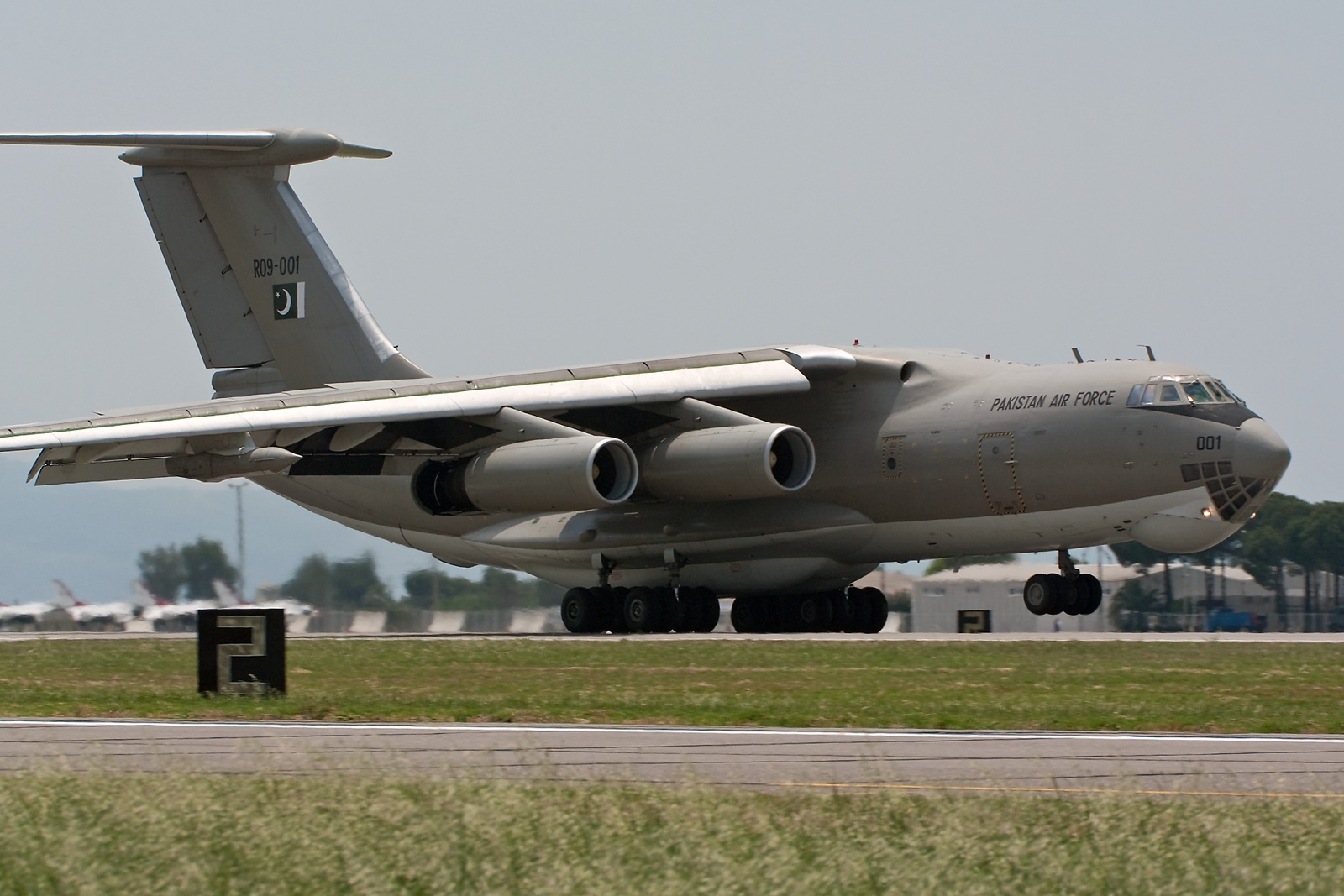
A PAF IL-78 landing

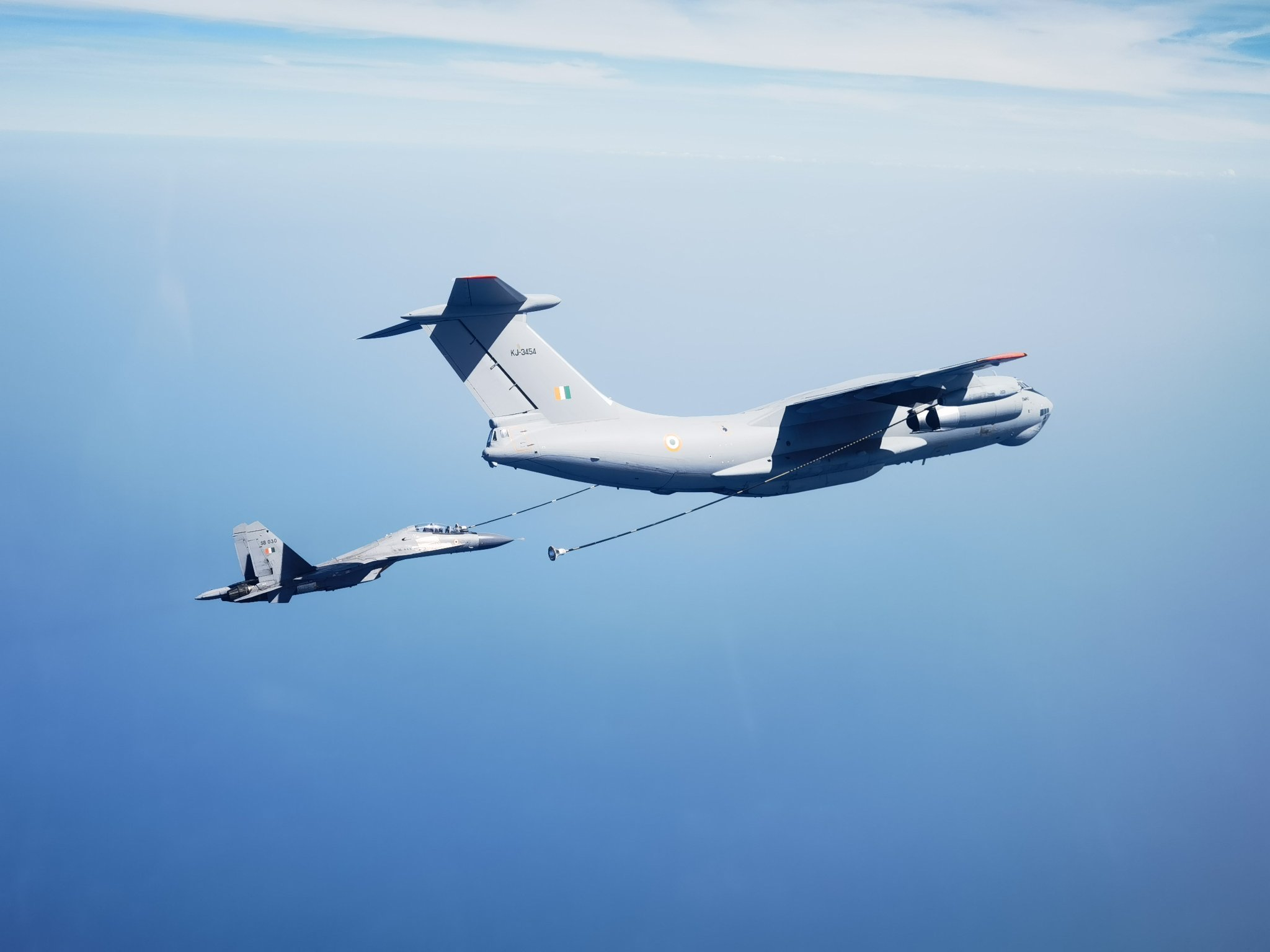
Sukhoi Su-30MKI refuelling from an Ilyushin Il-78 during exercise Konkan Shakti 21

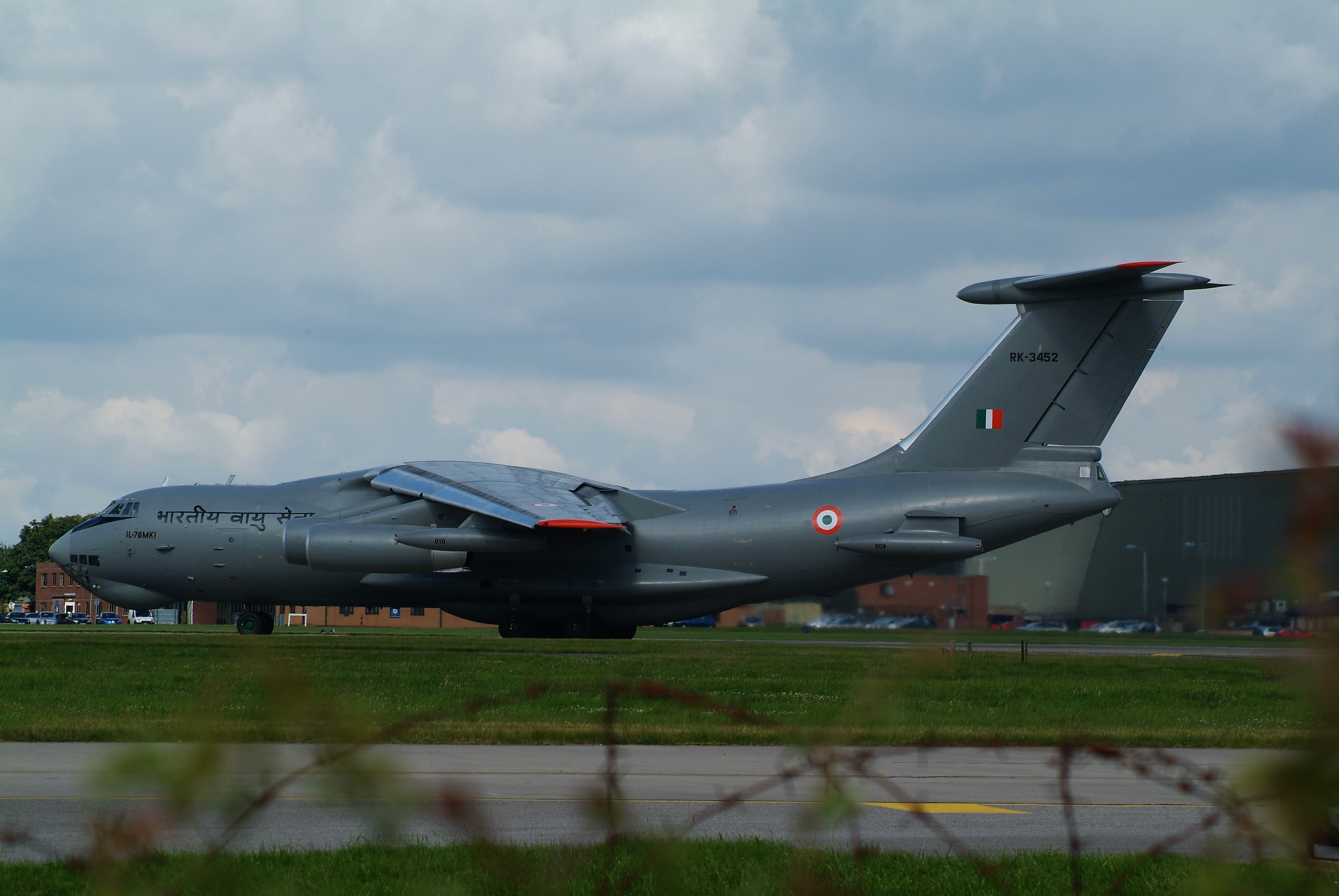
An Indian Air Force Ilyushin Il-78

=== Current operators ===
Algeria

- Algerian Air Force – six Il-78s bought from Ukraine in 1998, delivered between 1998 and 2003 after servicing in Russia. Four Il-78s in service of Algerian Airforce as of 2017.

China

- Chinese Air Force – three Il-78s ordered from Ukraine in 2011, delivered between 2014 and 2016 after overhauls. These aircraft are fitted with UPAZ-1 pods.

India

- Indian Air Force – six Il-78MKIs delivered in 2003 and 2004, operated by No. 78 Squadron at Agra AFS.

Pakistan

- Pakistan Air Force – four Il-78s were ordered from Ukrainian surplus stocks in 2006, fitted with removable fuel tanks and UPAZ refueling pods. They were delivered between 2009 and 2011 after being overhauled at the Mykolaiv aircraft repair plant. These aircraft received the designation Il-78MP.
  - No. 10 Squadron "Bulls"

Russia

- Russian Aerospace Forces – 19 Il-78/78Ms in service as of 2019.
  - 43rd Center for Combat Application and Training of Aircrew for Long Range Aviation – Dyagilevo (air base), Ryazan Oblast
  - 203rd Guards Air Refueling Regiment

=== Former operators ===
Angola

- National Air Force of Angola – one ordered from Ukraine in 2001. Refueling equipment was removed and the aircraft rebuilt into an Il-76TD before it was sent to Angola in 2003. Scrapped in 2014.

Libya

- Libyan Air Force – one Il-78E bought in 1989. Destroyed in a 2015 attack on Mitiga International Airport.

Soviet Union

- Soviet Air Forces – aircraft were transferred to the Russian and Ukrainian Air Forces after the dissolution of the Soviet Union.
  - 106th Heavy Bomber Aviation Division – Uzyn Air Base, Kyiv Oblast, Ukrainian SSR
  - 409th Aviation Regiment of tanker aircraft

Ukraine

- Ukrainian Air Force – inherited 20 Il-78s after the collapse of the Soviet Union. At least three were converted to transport aircraft for Busol Airlines by 1995.
  - 106th Heavy Bomber Aviation Division – Pryluky Air Base, Chernihiv Oblast

United States

- An Il-78 of the Ukrainian Air Force was bought by North American Tactical Aviation Inc (NATA) in 2005, and flown to the United States in July 2006 for use in air refueling operations contracted to the United States military. It passed into Air Support Systems LLC ownership and got an American civilian registration N78GF. It was then mothballed at North Texas Regional Airport for two and a half years. In 2009, it left the airport with a Ukrainian crew hired by NATA and was heading to Wittman Regional Airport, Wisconsin, to refuel before flying to Pakistan for phase aircraft maintenance. However, it was diverted to Sawyer International Airport, Michigan, where it remains grounded. In 2010, the aircraft was repossessed by the Bank of Utah Trustee and in 2019 sold to Meridican Inc, an international consulting firm in Philadelphia, Pennsylvania. The aircraft was to receive a cockpit upgrade for international operations in 2018. It was undergoing engineering changes in 2022 to upgrade its air-to-air refueling pods, hose and drogue system to a Western-manufactured system that is compatible with US Navy and NATO.

== Specifications (Il-78M) ==
Data from Ilyushin, UAC

General characteristics

- Crew: 6
- Capacity: Max 100,000 kg payload (T-6 military jet fuel)
- Length: 46.59 m (152 ft 10 in)
- Wingspan: 50.5 m (165 ft 8 in)
- Height: 14.76 m (48 ft 5 in)
- Wing area: 300 m^{2} (3,200 sq ft)
- Empty weight: 72,000 kg (158,733 lb)
- Max takeoff weight: 210,000 kg (462,971 lb)
- Special equipment: 3 x UPAZ-1M 'Sakhalin', (Unifitsirovaniy Podvesnoy Agregat Zaprahvki;— standardised suspended refuelling unit), refuelling pods; Two on pylons under the outer wings, and the third on the port side of the rear fuselage.
- Fuel transfer rate: 900 to 2,200 L/min (200 to 480 imp gal/min; 240 to 580 US gal/min)
- Powerplant: 4 × Aviadvigatel D-30 KP turbofan engines, 118 kN (27,000 lbf) thrust each

Performance

- Maximum speed: 850 km/h (530 mph, 460 kn)
- Range: 7,300 km (4,500 mi, 3,900 nmi)
- Service ceiling: 12,000 m (39,000 ft)
- Thrust/weight: 0.23

== See also ==
Aircraft of comparable role, configuration, and era

- Boeing KC-135 Stratotanker
- McDonnell Douglas KC-10 Extender
- Lockheed TriStar (RAF)
- Vickers VC10

Related lists

- List of tanker aircraft
