= Battle of Kharkov =

The Battle of Kharkov was any one of four World War II battles in and near the Soviet city of Kharkov in modern Ukraine. In usage the term is sometimes indistinct, perhaps meaning the collection of all fighting at Kharkov including and in between the four named battles, or perhaps meaning just one of the battles without specifying which. For example, soldiers have received awards "for their action in the Battle of Kharkov".

The four named battles are:

- First Battle of Kharkov, an October 1941 battle in which German troops captured the city
- Second Battle of Kharkov, a May 1942 battle in which Soviet forces attempted to retake the city
- Third Battle of Kharkov, a February 1943 battle in which Soviet forces were driven out again, and the Germans forces retook the city
- Belgorod–Kharkov offensive operation, an August 1943 battle in which Soviet forces retook the city. In German nomenclature, the operation is usually referred to as the Fourth Battle of Kharkov.

== See also ==
- Kharkiv Operation
- Kharkiv (disambiguation)
- Kharkov (disambiguation)
