= CHG =

CHG may refer to:

== Transport ==
- Challenge Aero, a Ukrainian airline
- Chaoyang Airport, in Liaoning Province, China
- Charing railway station, in England
- Chinchpokli railway station, of the Mumbai Suburban Railway

== Other uses ==
- Caucasus Hunter-Gatherer, ancient human genetic lineage
- Chagatai language
- CHG International, an American real estate developer
- CHG Healthcare Services, an American health care company
- Chlorhexidine gluconate, a disinfectant and antiseptic

== See also ==
- CHGS (disambiguation)
