= Kharkiv Operation =

Kharkiv Operation may refer to:

- Kharkiv Operation (June 1919), offensive during the Russian Civil War by White forces
- Kharkiv Operation (December 1919), offensive during the Russian Civil War by the Red Army
- Occupation of Kharkiv (1917), first episode of the Ukrainian-Soviet War

== See also ==
- Battle of Kharkiv (disambiguation)
- Occupation of Kharkiv (disambiguation)
- Kharkov (disambiguation)
- Kharkiv (disambiguation)
