= CHGS =

CHGS may refer to:

== Schools ==
- Crossley Heath Grammar School, in Halifax, England
- Cambridge House Grammar School, in Ballymena, Northern Ireland
- Central Hindu Girls School, in Bhelupur, Varanasi, India
- Chatham House Grammar School, in Ramsgate, England

== Radio stations ==
- CHGS (AM), now CJRW-FM, a radio station in Prince Edward Island, Canada

== See also ==
- CHG (disambiguation)
