= Denys Kostrzhevskyi =

Ukrainian businessman and executive

- Денис Костржевський
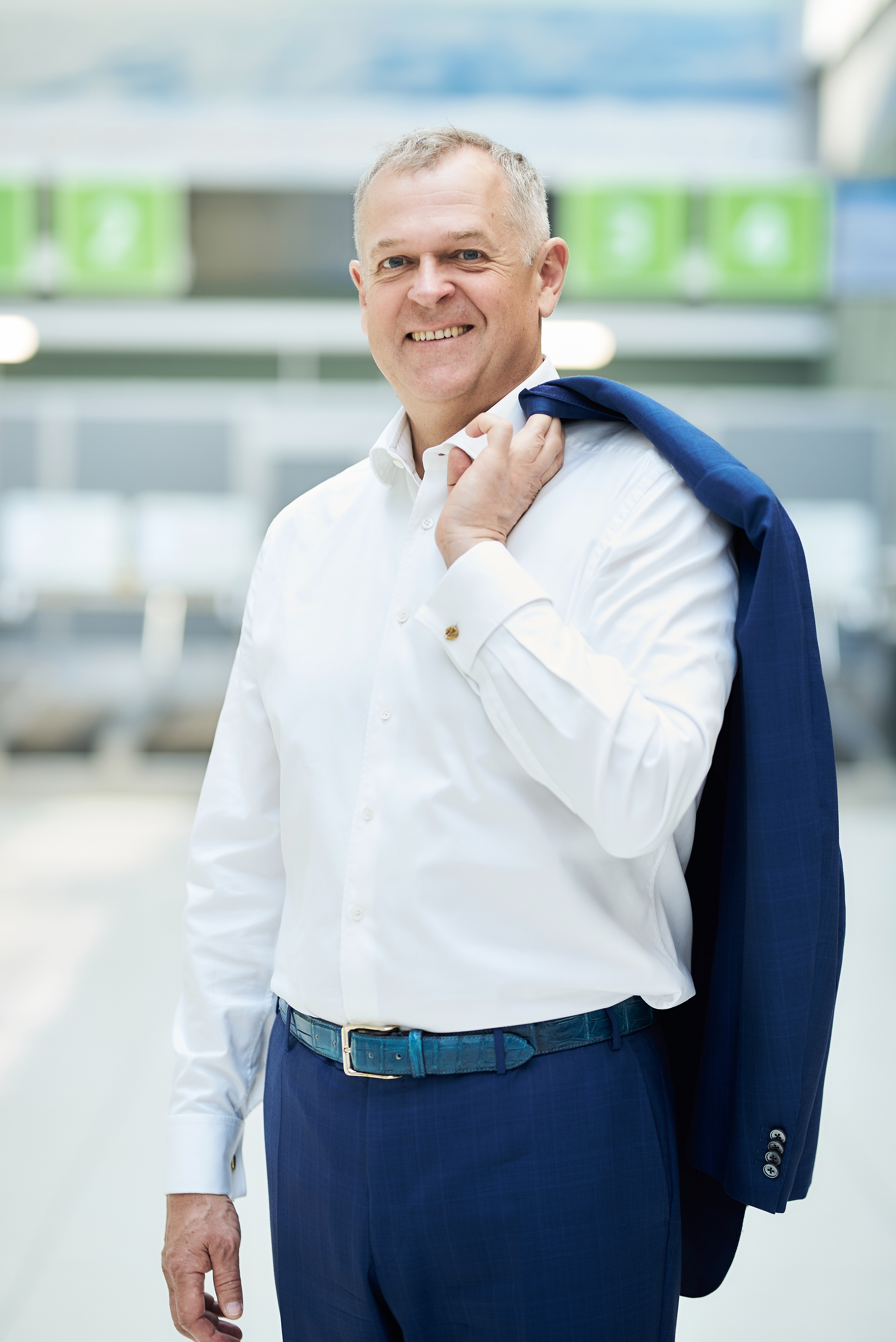
- Denys Kostrzhevskyi
- Born: October 29, 1968 (age 57); Kyiv, Ukrainian
- Education: Taras Shevchenko National University of Kyiv
- Occupations: Businessman, executive
- Known for: Real estate development and airport management
- Office: Chairman of the Board of Directors of Kyiv International Airport
- Website: https://kostrzhevskyi.com/en/denys-kostrzhevskyj-english/

Denys Kostrzhevskyi (Ukrainian: Денис Костржевський) (born 29 October 1968, Kyiv, Ukraine) is a Ukrainian businessman and executive. As of early February 2022, he is the chairman of the board of Kyiv International Airport, and the president of the construction company Miskzhitlobud.

== Biography ==
Denys Kostrzhevskyi was born October 29, 1968, in Kyiv.

1975–1985 – attended secondary specialized school No. 129 with in-depth study of the English language. (in Kyiv)

Graduated from Taras Shevchenko National University of Kyiv (1985–1992), specialization – solid-state optics. Teacher of physics and mathematics.

Completed postgraduate studies at the NASU Institute of Physics (1992–1993).

Studied at the National Academy for Public Administration under the President of Ukraine (2001–2003) and received a master's degree in Public Administration.

In 2011 participated in the Special American Business Internship Training (SABIT) program – Development of airports.

== Civil aviation ==
In July 2009, Kostrzhevskyi was appointed Deputy Director General for Airport Development at Kyiv International Airport (Zhulyany). From September 2009 to 2011, he served as Director General of the airport. Since 2011, he has served as Chairman of the Board of Directors of Kyiv International Airport (Igor Sikorsky Kyiv International Airport).

During his tenure, the airport underwent a major modernization programme as part of Ukraine's preparations for the UEFA Euro 2012 championship. The project included reconstruction and extension of the runway from 1,800 to 2,300 metres, construction of the new international Terminal A, and modernization of the airport's engineering and airfield infrastructure.

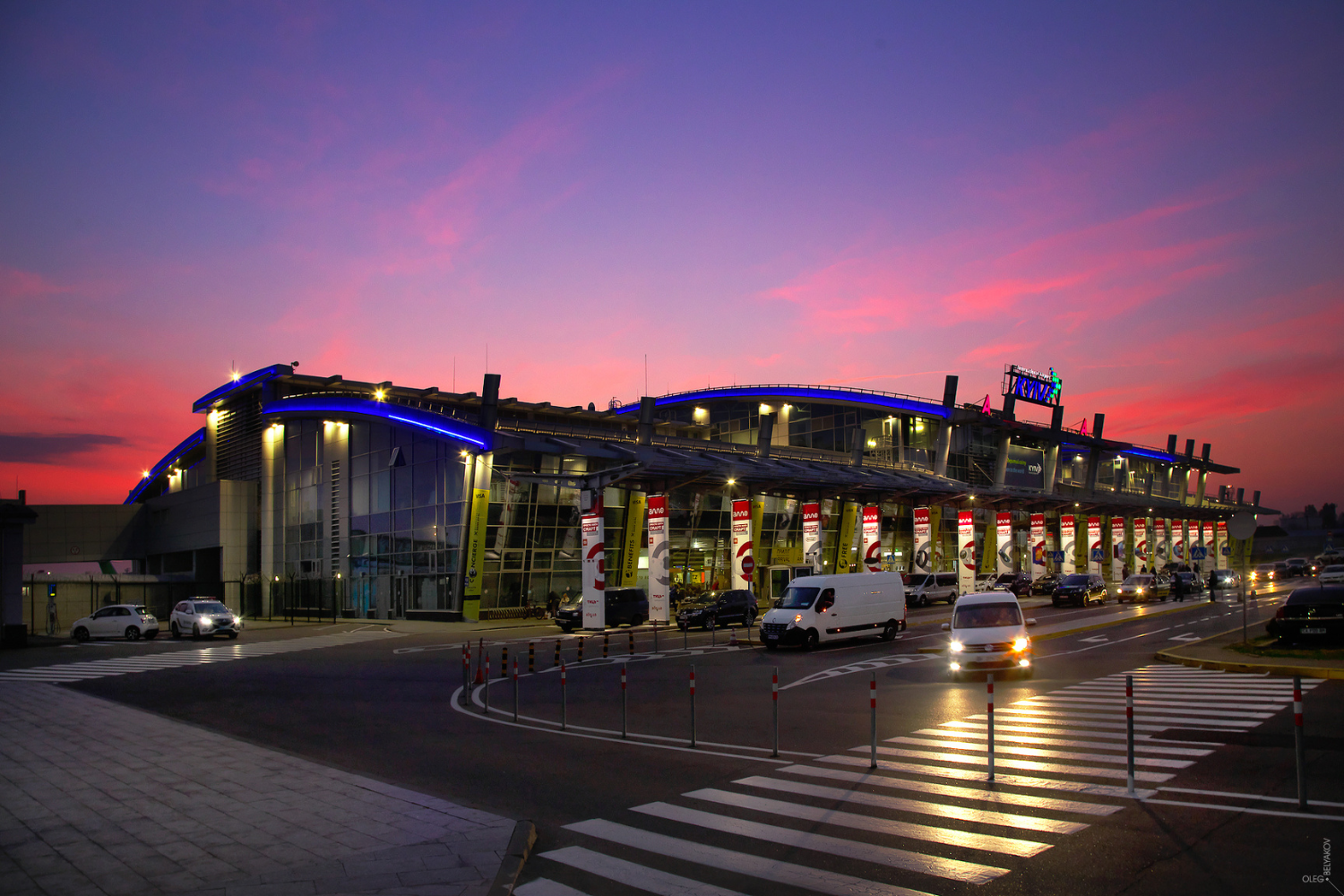
Terminal A of Kyiv International Airport

Between 2011 and 2022, the airport expanded its infrastructure, route network and passenger services. During this period, Kyiv International Airport became one of Ukraine's leading regional airports by passenger traffic and route network.

Following the full-scale Russian invasion of Ukraine in 2022, the airport's activities were focused on preserving its infrastructure, maintaining operational and certification readiness, and preparing for the future resumption of civil aviation operations.

The airport is also developing long-term plans for post-war reconstruction and modernization, including upgrades to the airfield infrastructure and the implementation of a development strategy extending to 2035.
