= DART Ukrainian Airlines =

Ukrainian airline (1997–2018)

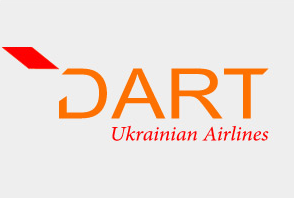
IATA	ICAO	Call sign
D4	DAT	-
- Founded: 1997
- Ceased operations: April 2018
- Hubs: Kyiv International Airport (Zhuliany)
- Fleet size: 8
- Destinations: 6
- Headquarters: Kyiv, Ukraine
- Website: aerodart.com.ua

DART Ukrainian Airlines (Ukrainian: ДАРТ Українські Авіалінії), was a Ukrainian airline headquartered in Kyiv and based at Kyiv International Airport (Zhuliany). In April 2018, the airline ceased all operations.

== History ==
DART Ukrainian Airlines was established in 1997 and offered scheduled and charter flights for passengers and cargo as well as aircraft leasing. In November 2016, DART expanded its operations by adding a single Boeing 737-300 to its fleet. The United States of America proposed sanctions against DART. The airline ceased operations in April 2018.

== Destinations ==
DART Ukrainian Airlines operated scheduled and charter flights to the following destinations:

Albania

- Tirana - Tirana International Airport

Georgia

- Tbilisi - Tbilisi International Airport

Greece

- Athens - Athens International Airport

Ukraine

- Kyiv - Kyiv International Airport (Zhuliany) base
- Odesa - Odesa International Airport seasonal charter

Montenegro

- Tivat - Tivat Airport seasonal charter

== Fleet ==
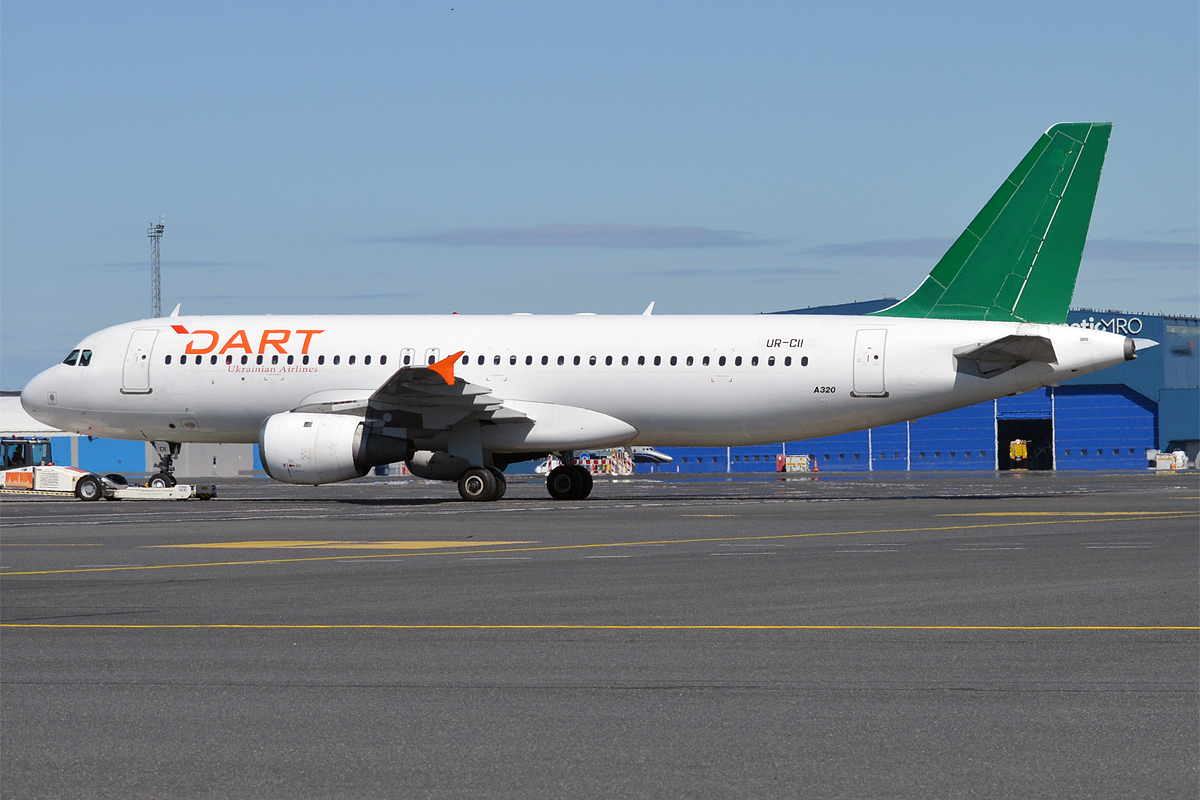
DART Airbus A320-200

As of November 2017, the DART Ukrainian Airlines fleet comprised the following aircraft:

DART Ukrainian Airlines fleet
Aircraft	In fleet	Orders	Passengers	Notes
Airbus A319-100	1	—	130	
Airbus A320-200	4	—	180	2 stored
Airbus A321-200	1	—		
Boeing 737-400	1	—	168	Stored
Bombardier Learjet 60	1	—	12	Business jet
Total	8	—		
