= Air Onix =

IATA	ICAO	Call sign
OG	ONX	ONIXAIR
- Founded: 2007
- Ceased operations: 12 December 2013
- Hubs: Simferopol International Airport
- Secondary hubs: Kyiv Zhuliany International Airport
- Fleet size: 2
- Headquarters: Simferopol, Ukraine
- Key people: Ihor Melnyk(General Director)

Air Onix (Ukrainian: Ейр Онікс, Russian: Эйр Оникс) was a Ukrainian airline headquartered in Simferopol (Crimea, Ukraine).

== History ==
On 28 April 2012, Air Onix launched its first flight from Simferopol (Simferopol Airport) to Kyiv (Zhuliany Airport).

On 7 November 2013, ILFC repossessed two of its Boeing 737 aircraft leased to Air Onix for unpaid debts. In December 2013, Air Onix was suspended from the IATA, its Air Operator Certificate being withdrawn by the Ukrainian aviation authorities. Two further Boeing 737s were put into storage.

== Destinations ==
As of December 2013 Air Onix served following destinations:

=== Asia ===
Israel

- Tel Aviv - Ben Gurion International Airport

Turkey

- Istanbul - Sabiha Gökçen International Airport

=== Caucasus ===
Armenia

- Yerevan - Zvartnots Airport

Georgia

- Tbilisi - Tbilisi International Airport

=== Europe ===
Montenegro

- Tivat - Tivat Airport

Russia

- Moscow - Domodedovo International Airport
- Saint Petersburg - Pulkovo Airport

Slovakia

- Bratislava - M. R. Štefánik Airport

Ukraine

- Kyiv - Zhuliany International Airport Base
- Simferopol - Simferopol International Airport Base

== Fleet ==
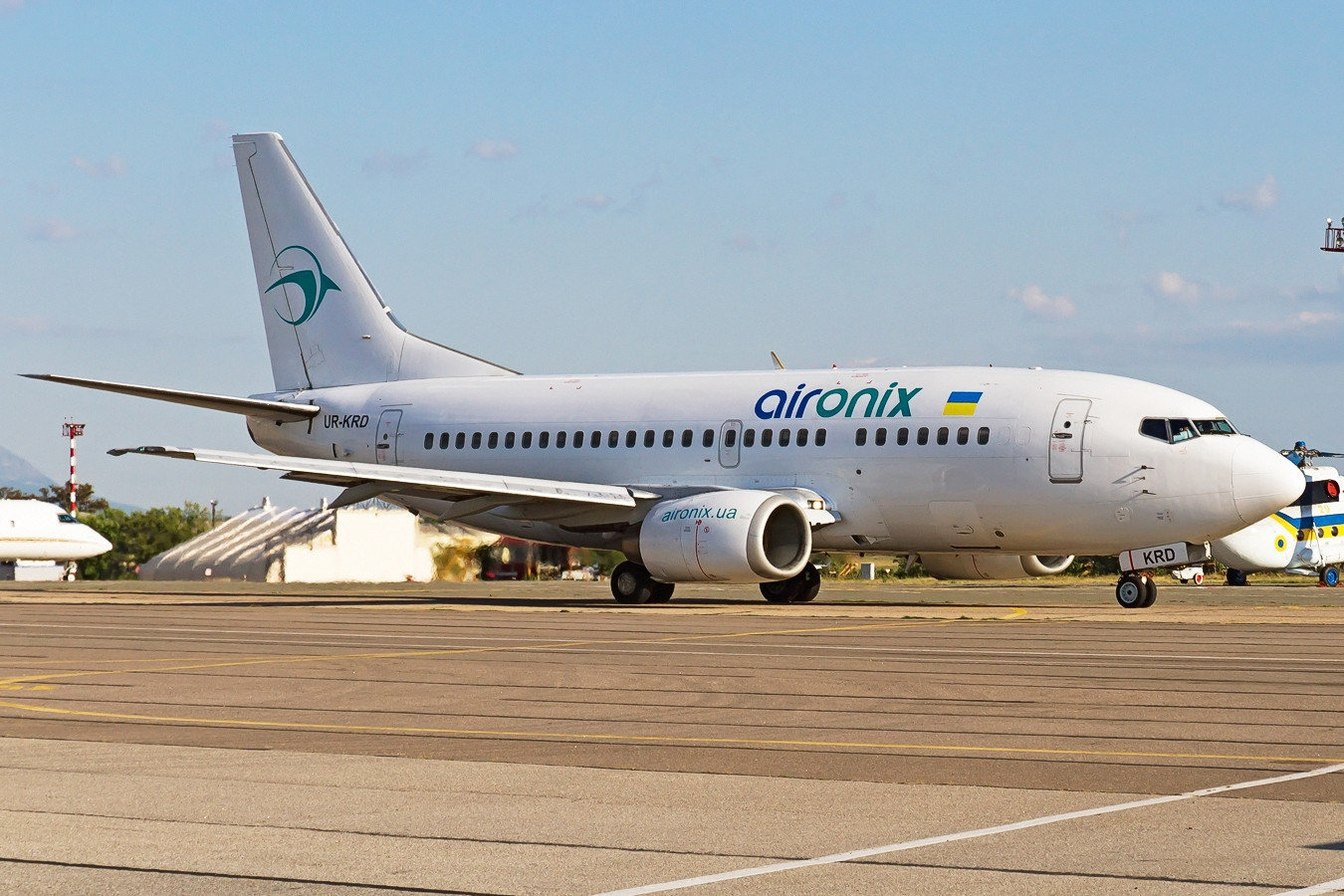
Air Onix Boeing 737-500

The Air Onix fleet consisted of the following aircraft (as of November 2013):

Air Onix Fleet
Aircraft	In Service	Orders
Boeing 737-300	1	0
Boeing 737-400	1	0
Total	2	0
