= Kharkiv (disambiguation) =

Kharkiv is a city in Ukraine.

Kharkiv may also refer to:

- Kharkiv International Airport in Kharkiv, Ukraine
- Kharkiv North Airport, Ukraine
- Kharkiv (river), a river in Kharkiv Oblast, Ukraine
- Kharkiv Oblast, Ukraine
- Kharkiv Raion, a district of Kharkiv Oblast, Ukraine
- Kharkiv, National University of Kharkiv, Ukraine
- 9167 Kharkiv, a main-belt asteroid
- FC Metalist Kharkiv, a Ukrainian football team based in Kharkiv, Ukraine
- FC Kharkiv, was a professional football club based in Kharkiv, Ukraine

== See also ==
- Kharkov (disambiguation), several uses of Kharkov which in some cases may be substituted for Kharkiv
- Battle of Kharkiv (disambiguation)
- Kharkiv Operation (disambiguation)
- Occupation of Kharkiv (disambiguation)
- Kharko, a village in Azerbaijan
