= Zhuliany =

Neighbourhood in the capital of Ukraine

Coordinates: 50°23′36.17″N 30°26′25.61″E

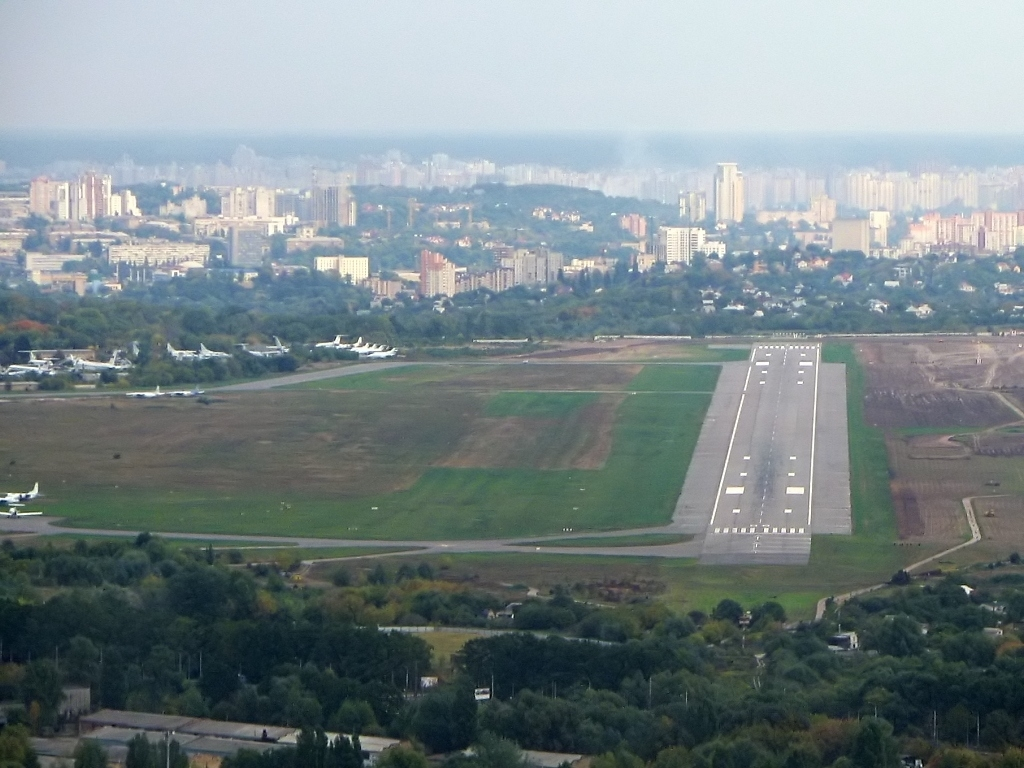
Zhuliany Airport runway with city skyline on background.

Zhuliany (Ukrainian: Жуляни) is a neighbourhood in the south-west of Kyiv, the capital of Ukraine. It is a predominantly cottage-built area, part of the Solomianskyi district. As well as Troieshchyna, Zhuliany became a part of Kyiv municipality in 1988.

The Kyiv International Airport is located in the neighborhood.

In late 1918 Zhuliany was the site of a battle between the Sich Riflemen and Hetmanate forces. On 29 August 1919 troops of the Ukrainian People's Army and Ukrainian Galician Army defeated the Bolsheviks in the area.

An apartment building was hit by a Russian missile strike during the 2022 Russian invasion of Ukraine.
