= SkyUp MT =

Low-cost airline of Malta, and subsidiary of SkyUp Airlines

IATA	ICAO	Call sign
U5	SEU	SKY MALTA
- Fleet size: 3
- Parent company: SkyUp Airlines
- Headquarters: Hamrun, Malta
- Website: skyup.aero

SkyUp MT Limited is a Maltese low-cost airline based in Hamrun, Malta. The airline commenced operations in May 2023 from Chișinău Eugen Doga International Airport and is a subsidiary of the Ukrainian SkyUp Airlines.

== Destinations ==
SkyUp MT operates scheduled and charter flights out of its base in Chișinău Eugen Doga International Airport, Moldova. As the airline is integrated into the SkyUp Airlines network, its routes are co-shared with its parent brand.

== Fleet ==
=== Current fleet ===
As of August 2026, SkyUp MT operates an all-Boeing 737 fleet composed of the following aircraft:

Aircraft	In service	Orders	Passengers	Notes
Boeing 737-800	3	—	189	One in United24 special livery.
Total	3	0		

=== Former fleet ===
SkyUp MT previously operated:

Aircraft	Total	Introduced	Retired	Notes
Airbus A321neo	3	2025	2025	Leased from Play Europe for 2024/2025 seasonal services.

=== Gallery ===
Airbus A321neo

Boeing 737-800

== Incidents and accidents ==
- On 7 July 2025, a SkyUp Airlines Airbus A321neo operated by PLAY Airlines while flying from Rzeszów to Sharm el-Sheikh, the plane flew into a hailstorm, damaging its nose and cockpit window. The plane was unable to return to the airport due to weather conditions, so it was diverted to Katowice. No one was injured.

== Controversies ==
=== Investigation by Polish authorities ===
In 2025, the Polish Civil Aviation Authority (ULC) audited the financial and operational status of SkyUp MT, flagging concerns in regards to a risk of insolvency, the acquisition of aircraft, and the quality of customer service. The authority sent inquiries to approximately fifty companies in the aviation and travel industry regarding unpaid amounts owned by the company, and expressed doubts about the airlines ability to continue reliable operations. Based on its findings, the ULC requested that the Office for Competition and Consumer Protection (UOKiK) to issue a warning to customers. UOKiK acknowledged the request, but stated that it was not actively conducting any investigations that would justify a warning. ULC additionally reminded Polish airports that they were within their right to refuse service to airlines that were late, or unable to pay airport charges.

The ULC also raised objections to the leasing of aircraft from outside the European Union without each lease being notified by Maltese authorities to other member states. This situation was further complicated by the bankruptcy of the Icelandic airline Play, which SkyUp MT had leased for services to Poland. ULC stated that the collapse of the airline had significantly disrupted the transport of Polish citizens resulting in action needed to rescue stranded passengers. ULC additionally sent a delegation to Malta to discuss oversight of SkyUp MT and pass on concerns, with further correspondence from the European Commission and Eurocontrol.

SkyUp MT and its parent SkyUp Airlines rejected the claims made by the ULC, and asserted that the company had secured liquidity and was not at risk of insolvency. It further stated that the acquisition and operation of aircraft was conducted in accordance with the relevant regulations.

== See also ==
- List of airlines of Malta
- SkyUp Airlines
