= Kharkov: The Soviet Spring Offensive =

WWII board wargame published in 1978

Kharkov
- Cover of Strategy & Tactics #68, which contained the pull-out game Kharkov
- Designers: Stephen Patrick
- Illustrators: Redmond A. Simonsen
- Publishers: Simulations Publications Inc.
- Publication: 1978
- Genres: WWII

Kharkov: The Soviet Spring Offensive is a board wargame published by Simulations Publications Inc. (SPI) in 1978 that simulates the Second Battle of Kharkov during World War II.

== Background ==
The massive German surprise offensive in the summer and fall of 1941 against the Soviet Union, Operation Barbarossa, had finally ground to a halt during the winter months. The Soviets and the Germans unknowingly both planned simultaneous major spring offensives in the vicinity of the Russian city of Kharkov. The Soviets struck first on 12 May 1942, and for a few days rolled back German forces. Then the Germans struck back with their planned offensive, Operation Fredericus, and suddenly it was the Soviets who found themselves overextended and on the defensive.

== Description ==
Kharkov is a two-player board wargame in which one player controls the German forces and the other the Soviet forces. With only 200 counters and a relatively small map, the game is not overly complex.

=== Gameplay ===
The game uses a set of rules for movement and combat developed for SPI's bestselling 1976 wargame Panzergruppe Guderian: In an alternating "I Go, You Go" system, players move and then attack. However, during the German turn, German armored units get to move a second time following regular movement and combat. One game turn by both players represents one day of real time.

Kharkov also uses Panzergruppe Guderian's game mechanic of "untried units", where Soviet units start the game facedown on the map — neither player knows the actual combat strength of the unit until it is engaged in combat and flipped over.

Soviet units must be able to trace a line back to a headquarters location in order to be in supply; unsupplied units cannot actively attack.

To simulate the Soviet offensive, Soviet forces can ignore German zones of control during the first two turns of the game. To simulate the delayed German offense, German units on the southern half of the board cannot move until the start of Operation Fredericus on the fifth turn, unless they are attacked.

The game lasts for 10 turns, and is decided by accumulation of victory points for enemy units destroyed and for Russian cities under control by the end of the game.

== Publication history ==
Kharkov was designed by Stephen Pattrick and appeared as a free pull-out game in Issue 68 of SPI's house magazine Strategy & Tactics (July–August 1978). The game was also offered for sale in SPI's standard "flat-pack" box. Although critical reception was favorable, critic Steve List noted that "despite being in the [Panzergruppe Guderian] mold, [Kharkov] has never been as popular." The game failed to crack SPI's Top Ten Bestseller List.

== Reception ==
In The Playboy Winner's Guide to Board Games, game designer Jon Freeman noted that Kharkov used the same game system as SPI's previous publication, Panzergruppe Guderian, but thought that Kharkov was better balanced, allowed a more active role for both players, and was "arguably better than [Panzergruppe Guderian].

In Issue of 50 of Moves, Steve List noted that the game is difficult for the Soviet player, who is forced to "choose between committing units to his offensive or holding them back to screen his flank from the inevitable German attack. Too much force in either area will result in failure in the other." List concluded by giving the game a grade of "A-", saying, "All in all, a worthwhile game on a subject covered, if at all, only as part if a larger situation."

In The Guide to Simulations/Games for Education and Training, Richard Rydzel called this "an easy-to-learn game [that] is an excellent example of Russian combat doctrines in World War II." In considering this game as an educational aid in the classroom, Ryzdel commented, "The short preparation and playing time make this a good simulation for school use; however, both players should be prepared to lose lots of units and a Russian player who isn't careful may lose all units."

Two retrospective reviews appeared in the October 2000 edition of Simulacrum. In the first, Luc Olivier commented, "This game is interesting to play and challenging for both sides. First the setup of both sides can make or break the game, then the initial push of the Russians has to be carefully planned, and lastly the German counterattack should [collect as many Victory Points] as possible." Olivier concluded, "With 10 turns and not many units, the game plays quickly and the rules are rather clear. So, like a good bottle of Burgundy, this simulation has improved with age." In the second review, Mark Wegierski noted, "One main appealing aspect of Kharkov is that both players are involved in surging offensives and desperate defenses at different points in the game." Wegierski concluded, "While adding some interesting new rules, Kharkov continued the tradition of the essential elegance of [Panzergruppe Guderian].

== Other reviews and commentary ==
- Fire & Movement #18 & #63
- The Wargamer Vol.1 #11
- Phoenix #21
- American Wargamer Vol.6 #1
- Line of Departure #21
