= SkyUp Nistru =

Low-cost airline of Moldova, and subsidiary of SkyUp Airlines

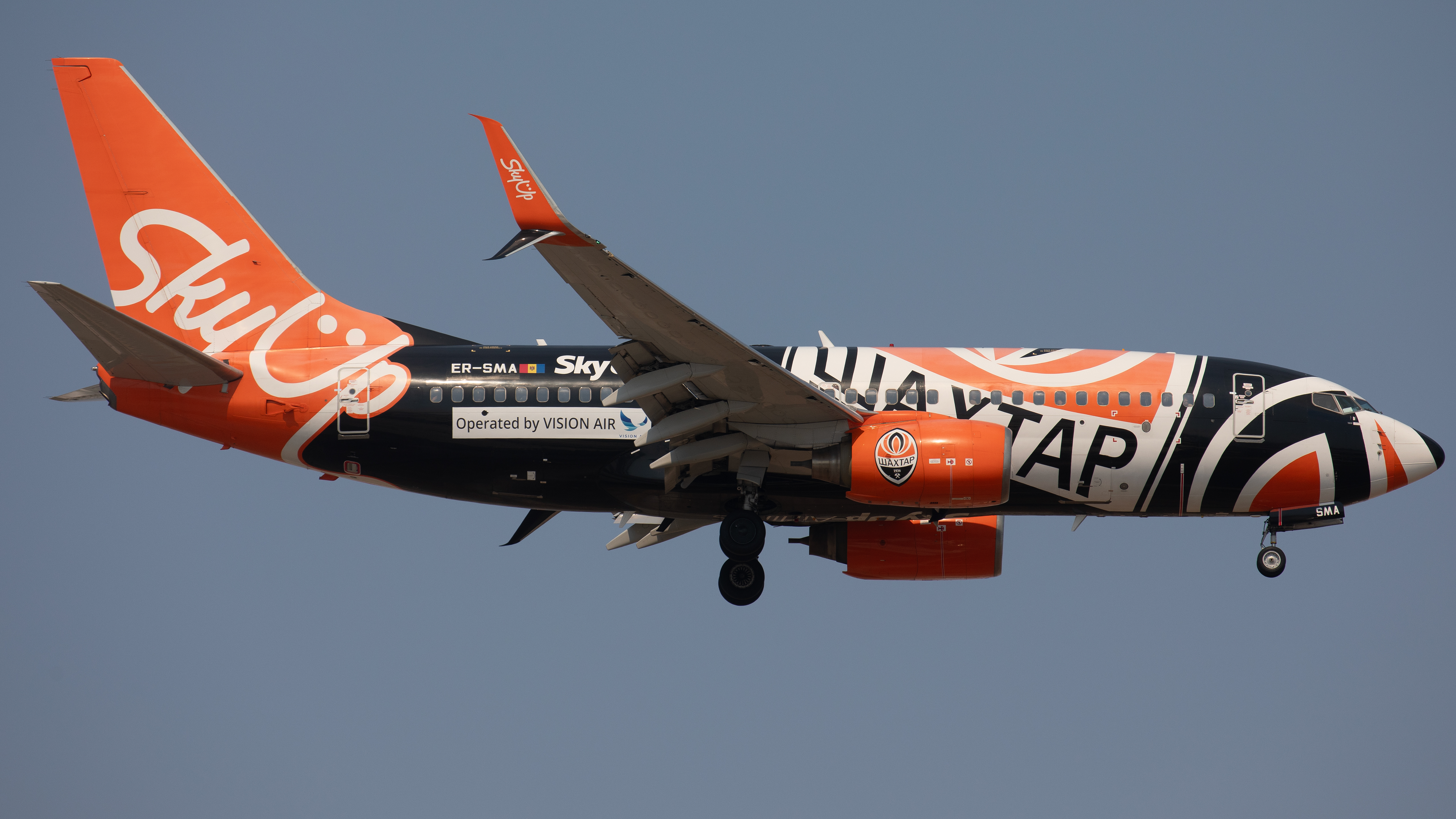
- A Vision Air Boeing 737-700
IATA	ICAO	Call sign
4V	SQY	SKY TIRAS
- Operating bases: Chișinău
- Fleet size: 2
- Parent company: SkyUp Airlines
- Headquarters: Chișinău, Moldova
- Website: skyup.aero

SkyUp Nistru (Note: "SKY UP NISTRU" S.R.L), formerly Vision Air, is a Moldovan low-cost airline based in Chișinău. The airline commenced operations from its base in Chișinău Eugen Doga International Airport as Vision Air in 2025. As part of a corporate restructuring a year later in 2026, the airline was incorporated into the branding of its Ukrainian parent company SkyUp Airlines, under its present name. The airline derives its name from the Romanian name for the Dniester River.

== Destinations ==
SkyUp Nistru operates scheduled and charter flights out of its base in Chișinău Eugen Doga International Airport, Moldova. As the airline is integrated into the SkyUp Airlines network, its routes are co-shared with its parent brand.

== Fleet ==
As of August 2026, SkyUp Nistru operates an all-Boeing 737 fleet composed of the following aircraft:

=== Active fleet ===
Aircraft	In service	Orders	Passengers	Notes
Boeing 737-800	1	—	189	Wet leased in August 2026.
Boeing 737-700	1	—	149	One in FC Shakhtar Donetsk special livery.
Total	2	0		
