= Challenge Aero =

Ukrainian airline

IATA	ICAO	Call sign
—	—	SKY CHALLENGER
- Founded: 2002
- Fleet size: 7
- Parent company: AC CHALLENGE AERO LLC
- Headquarters: Kyiv, Ukraine
- Website: challenge.aero

Challenge Aero was a business aviation airline based in Kyiv, Ukraine. Established in 2002, it operated charter flights within Ukraine and to neighbouring CIS countries.
