= Occupation of Kharkiv =

Occupation of Kharkiv may refer to:

- Soviet occupation of Kharkiv (1917), part of the Ukrainian-Soviet War
- German occupation of Kharkiv (1941–1943), part of the Eastern Front (World War II)
- Russian occupation of Kharkiv Oblast (2022–present), part of the Russo–Ukrainian War
