= Kyiv International Airport (Zhuliany) =

Airport in the capital of Ukraine, Kyiv

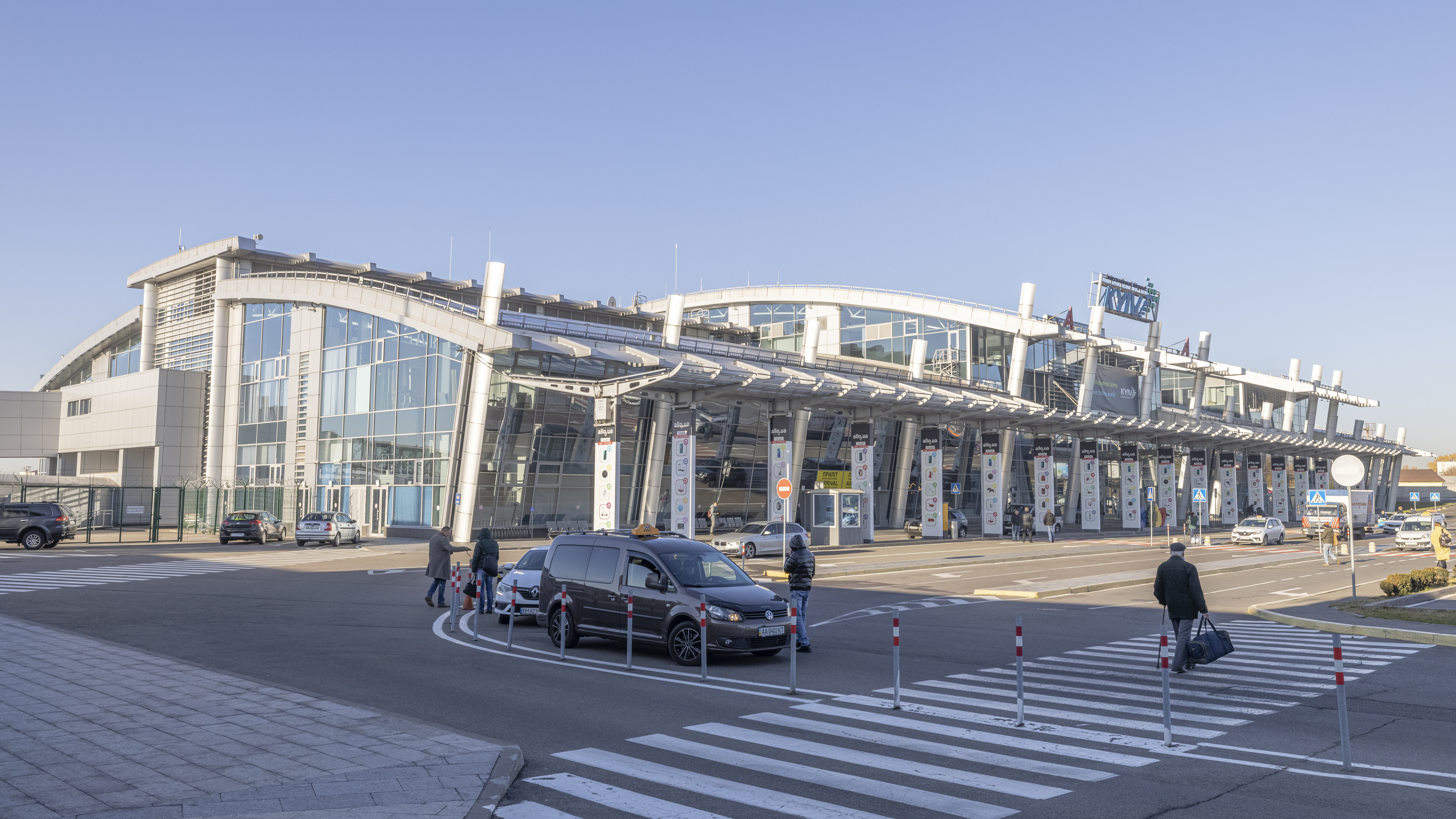
- IATA: IEV; ICAO: UKKK; WMO: 33345

Summary
- Airport type: Public / Military
- Owner: City of Kyiv/Govt. of Ukraine
- Serves: Kyiv, Ukraine
- Location: Zhuliany
- Opened: 1924; 102 years ago
- Elevation AMSL: 179 m (587 ft)
- Coordinates: 50°24′06″N 30°27′06″E
- Website: iev.aero

Map
- Interactive map of Kyiv International Airport (Zhuliany)

Runways
Direction	Length		Surface
Direction	m	ft	Surface
08/26	2,310	7,579	Asphalt

Statistics (2019)
- Passengers: ▼2,617,900
- Flights: ▲30,248

The Igor Sikorsky Kyiv International Airport (Zhuliany) (Ukrainian: Міжнародний аеропорт «Київ» імені Ігоря Сікорського (Жуляни), (IATA: IEV, ICAO: UKKK)) is one of the two passenger airports of the Ukrainian capital Kyiv, the other being Boryspil International Airport. It is owned by the municipality of Kyiv and located in the Zhuliany neighbourhood, about seven kilometres (four nautical miles) southwest of the city centre. Aside from facilitating regular passenger flights, Kyiv International Airport is also the main business aviation airport in Ukraine, and one of the busiest business aviation hubs in Europe.

== History ==
=== Early years ===
The airport began in 1923 as a military airfield co-used by the Ukrpovitroshlyakh (Ukrainian Society of Air Communications), Ukraine's earliest civil aviation company, which in 1934 was integrated into Aeroflot as the latter's regional administration. The airport terminal was built only after World War II in 1949. Until the 1960s, Zhuliany was the only passenger airport serving Kyiv.

In 1959, the larger Boryspil International Airport was built near the city of Boryspil, gradually replacing Zhuliany as the main airport serving Kyiv. Since that time the old "Kyiv" airport became commonly known just as "Zhuliany" (or Kyiv-Zhuliany) and was used for Soviet domestic flights only.

=== International flights and traffic revival ===
After Ukraine regained independence in 1991, Zhuliany began receiving international flights from nearby countries (first from its former Soviet "domestic" destinations), increasingly so since the 2000s when Ukraine's civil aviation started booming. On 27 March 2011, Wizz Air, a European low-cost airline, moved all its operations to Zhuliany from Boryspil, bringing around-the-clock flights to the airport and increasing passenger traffic by 15 to 20%.

In 2012, the airport managed to survive the European cold wave without major flight delays or cancellations.

Surrounded by major railways, highways and residential districts, the airport has limited possibilities to expand its runway. Therefore, it is limited in the weight of aircraft that are allowed to fly in the airport (currently up to Boeing 737/Airbus A320 type). In 2013, the airport declared plans to expand the runway for additional 150 m, although stressing complete safety and operability of its current length. Other parts of the airport infrastructure are also being developed. The new "A" terminal opened on 17 May 2012, now receives all international and some domestic flights. Projects for expanding Zhuliany's taxiways and aircraft parking lots are being considered as well.

=== Recent developments ===
In the first half of 2013, the airport's passenger traffic rose 2.7-fold (to 816,757 passengers per year) since the beginning of the year, including 4.2-fold growth of the domestic traffic. According to the media and industry experts, once underdog Zhuliany Airport has rapidly grown into a major, and more efficient, competitor to the country's leading Boryspil Airport.

As of July 2013, Moscow, Treviso and Dortmund were the most popular international destinations from the airport, with Simferopol, Donetsk and Odesa leading among domestic destinations. Also in 2013, the airport opened a new domestic terminal and a new business terminal, with currently 3 terminals in service.

In March 2015, Wizz Air Ukraine announced that it would cease operations leading to the cancellation of several routes from their base at the airport. Only some of their former routes were taken over by its parent, Wizz Air, though the airline has since expanded its flight network from the airport, with twenty destinations to be served by August 2017.

Between 14 and 24 May 2017, the airport was closed for runway improvement work.

On 22 March 2018, the Kyiv City Council officially renamed the airport International Airport "Kyiv" (Zhulyany) Igor Sikorsky in honor of Igor Sikorsky.

On 24 February 2022, five explosions erupted as part of the Russian invasion of Ukraine. On the same day, Ukraine closed airspace to civilian flights. The airspace and the airport remain closed.

== Airlines and destinations ==
The following airlines had operated regular scheduled and charter flights to and from Kyiv International Airport (Zhuliany) in the weeks prior to the suspension of Ukrainian airspace (on 24 February 2022):

Airlines	Destinations
LOT Polish Airlines	Warsaw–Chopin
Motor Sich Airlines	Lviv, Mykolaiv, Odesa, Zaporizhzhia
Pegasus Airlines	Seasonal: Dalaman

== Neighboring aviation facilities ==
- A major aircraft maintenance, repair and overhaul company, the so-called Kyiv Aircraft Repair Plant 410, adjoins the airport.
- In 2003, the Ukraine State Aviation Museum was created in one of the industrial estates neighboring the airport. It is the largest aviation museum in Ukraine, exhibiting some unique Soviet examples including original prototypes for famous airliners.

== Statistics ==
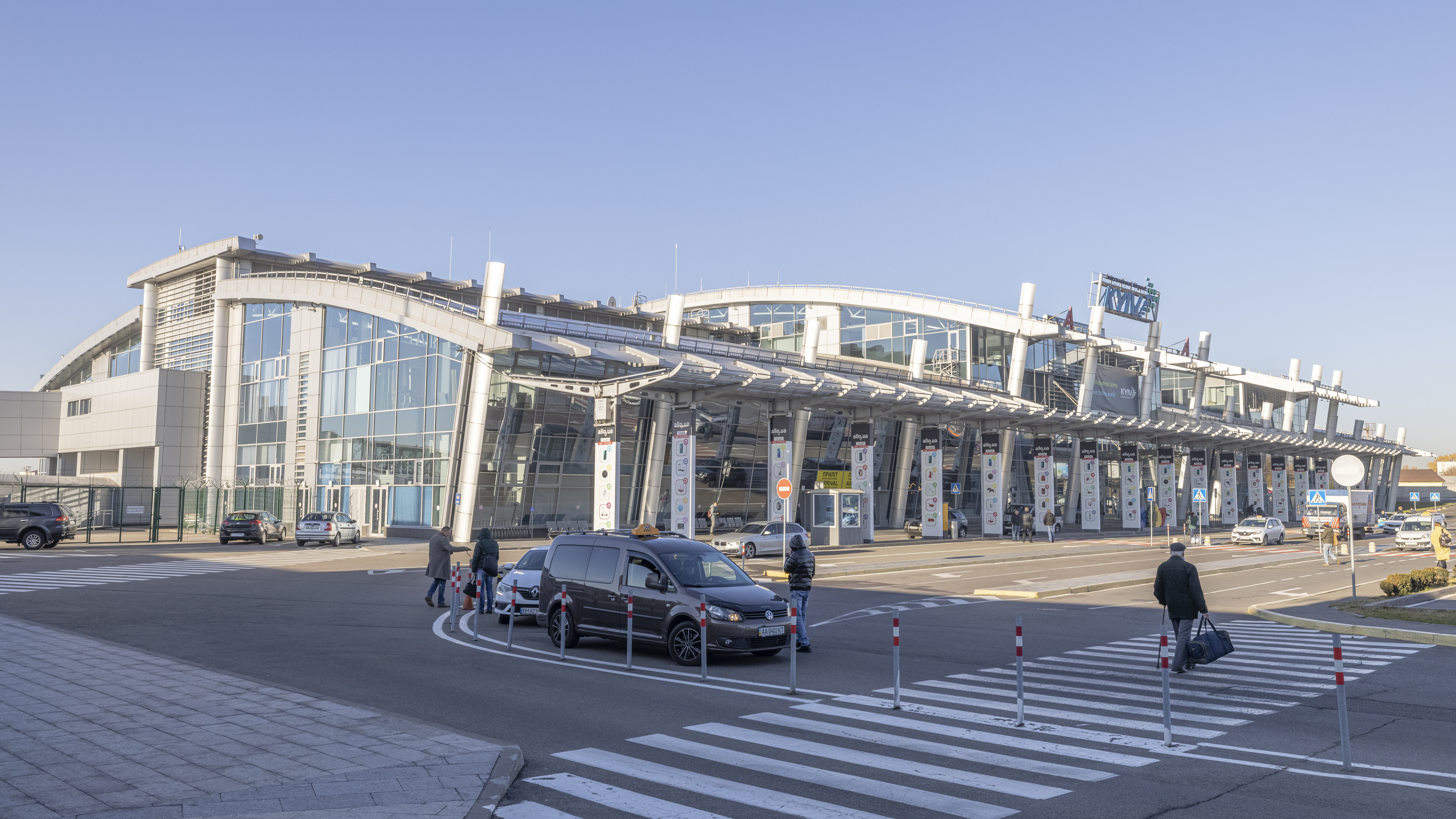
Terminal building

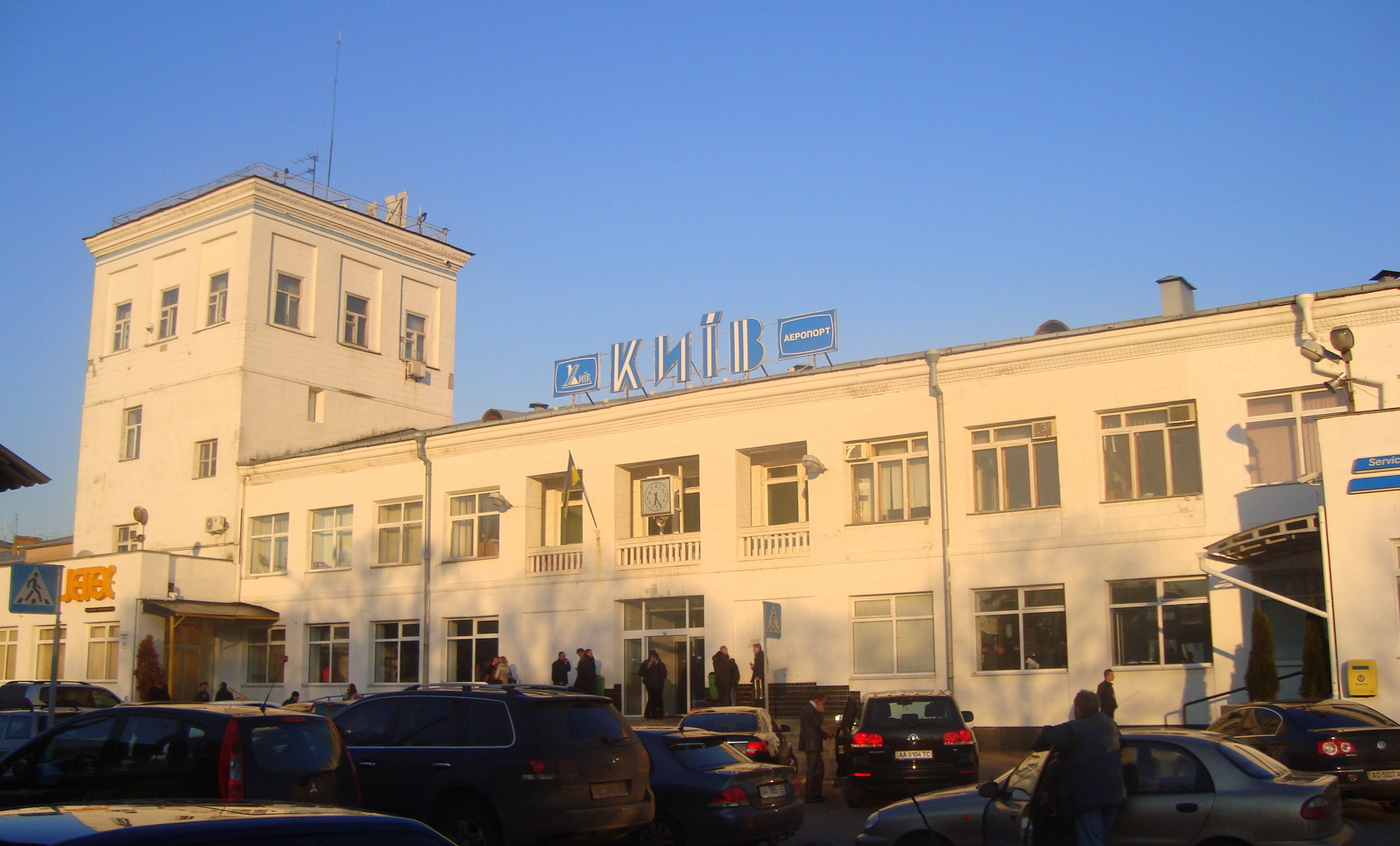
The original, Soviet-built passenger terminal served as the domestic terminal until mid-2013.

Year	Passengers	Change
2002	258,800	–
2016	1,127,500	▲19.4%
2017	1,851,700	▲67.3%
2018	2,812,300	▲51.9%
2019	2,617,900	▼6.9%
2020	690,300	▼73.6%

== Ground transportation ==
=== Road ===
The airport is connected to the city's main highway infrastructure via Povitroflotskyi Avenue and served by a number of city transport routes, including:

- Trolleybus Route 22: 'Kyiv' Airport-Olzhycha Street (transfer for metro at Dorohozhychi Station – Syretsko–Pecherska line)
- Bus Route 78: 'Kyiv' Airport-Vasylkivska Metro Station (transfer for metro – Obolonsko–Teremkivska line)

As well as private bus routes. Car parking facilities at the airport itself are limited, but long-term parking can be found in the airport's immediate vicinity. Taxis can often be found waiting directly outside the terminal, in the passenger drop-off/pick-up area.

=== Rail ===
The airport's old passenger terminal is located about 0.5 km away from the Kyiv-Volynskyi rail station – a stop for elektrichka commuter trains as well as for the intracity Urban Electric Train service.

== See also ==
- List of airports in Ukraine
- List of the busiest airports in Ukraine
- List of the busiest airports in Europe
- List of the busiest airports in the former USSR
- Denis Kostrzhevskiy, the airport's chairman
