= List of defunct airlines of Jordan =

This is a list of defunct airlines from Jordan.

Airline	IATA	ICAO	Image	Commenced operations	Ceased operations
Air Arabia Jordan	9P	JAD		2015	2018
Air Jordan of the Holy Land				1950	1961
Air Universal	UV	UVS		2002	2008
Jordan Airways				1961	1963
Meelad Air		MRL		2006	2008
Petra Airlines	9P	PTR		2010	2014
Royal Falcon		RFJ		2007	2016
Royal Wings	RY	RYW		1996	2018
Sky Gate International Aviation		SGJ		2003	2008

== See also ==
- List of airlines of Jordan
- List of airports in Jordan
