= List of Ilyushin Il-76 operators =

This article lists current and former operators of the Ilyushin Il-76 and its variants, the Ilyushin Il-78, Beriev A-50, Beriev A-60, Beriev A-100 and Shaanxi KJ-2000.

== Current operators ==
=== Military, paramilitary and government operators ===
==== Algeria ====
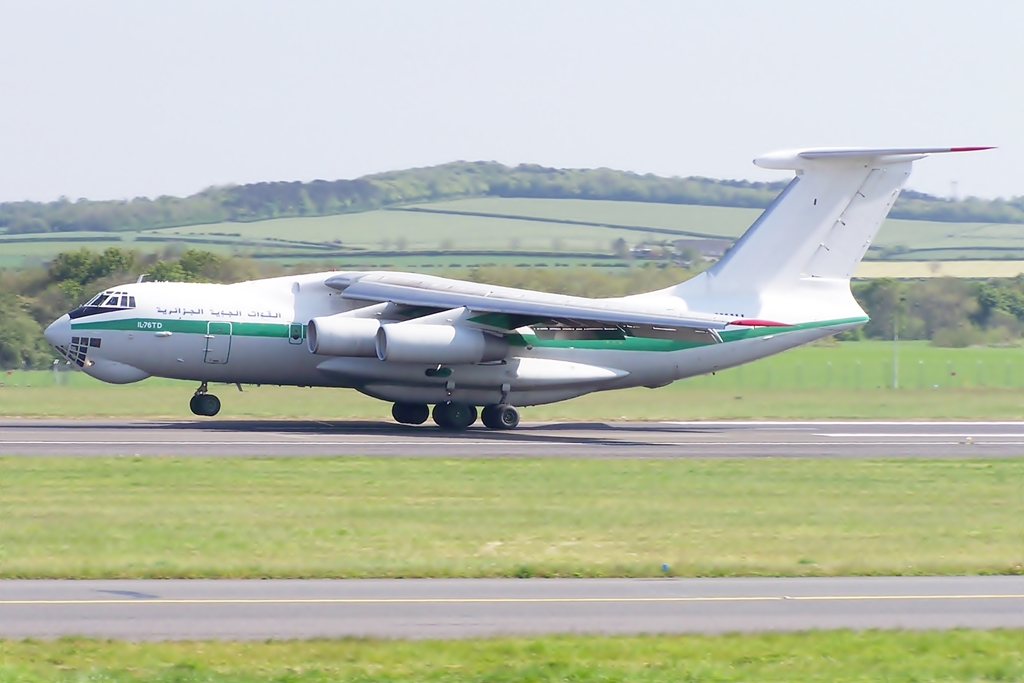
Algerian Air Force Il-76TD

The Algerian Air Force operate a number of Il-76 freighters and Il-78 tankers, supporting long range logistics and support for fighter operations. Orders for Il-76MD and Il-76TD aircraft began during the late Cold War, and continued after the collapse of the Soviet Union. In addition, further refurbished Il-78 tankers and Il-76MD / TD were sourced from Russia and Ukraine in the 2000s.

In 2021, it was reported that Il-76MD-90A aircraft equipped with more modern Aviadvigatel PS-90 engines would be ordered, but details remain scarce.

- Algerian Air Force – 11 Il-76MD / Il-76TD and 5 Il-78TD in service.
  - 347th Strategic Transport Squadron
  - 357th Strategic Transport Squadron
  - 367th Aerial Refueling Squadron

==== Angola ====
The National Air Force of Angola has operated a number of Il-76 aircraft since the early 2000s. Aircraft are operated by the 23rd Air Transportation Regiment, based at Luanda Air Base. Aircraft were delivered from 2001 to 2006, with airframes being delivered from Kazakhstan and Belarus.

From 2016 to 2017, several aircraft underwent refurbishment at the Belotserkovsky Cargo Aircraft Complex (BVAK), located at Bila Tserkva Air Base, Ukraine.

Another aircraft was delivered in Belarus in 2022.

- National Air Force of Angola – 7 Il-76MD and Il-76TD in service.
  - 23rd Air Transportation Regiment

==== Armenia ====
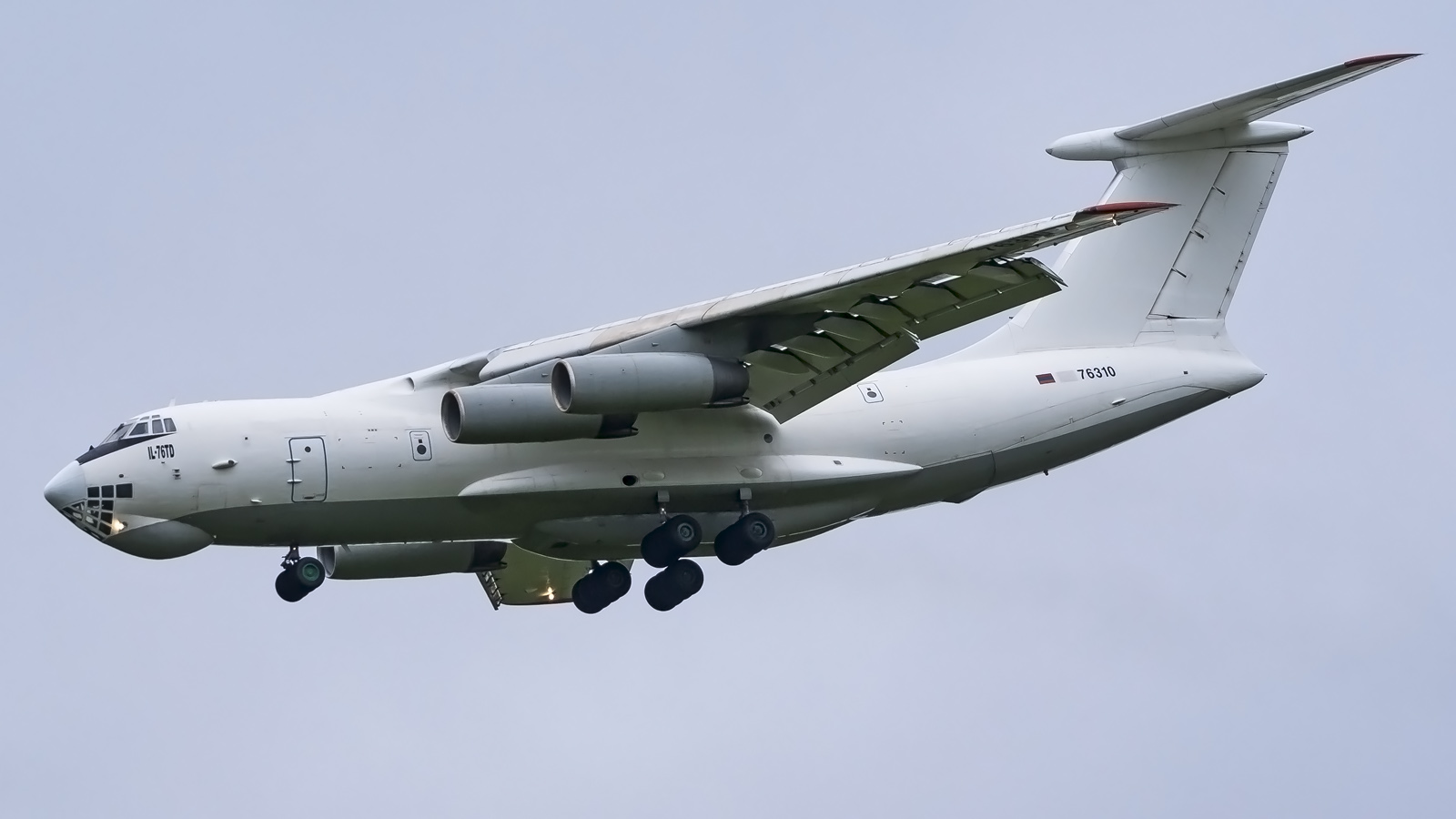
Armenian Air Force Il-76TD

Following independence, the Armenian Air Force inherited a small inventory of Il-76MD and TD aircraft from the former Soviet Union.

- Armenian Air Force – 3 Il-76MD and Il-76TD in service.

==== Azerbaijan ====
Following independence, the Azerbaijani Air Forces inherited a small inventory of Il-76TD aircraft from the former Soviet Union. These aircraft serve roles in both military and civil use.

- Azerbaijani Air Forces and Air Defense Troops – 2 Il-76TD in service.

Several more Il-76TD and Il-76-TD90 aircraft are operated by Silk Way Airlines.

==== Belarus ====
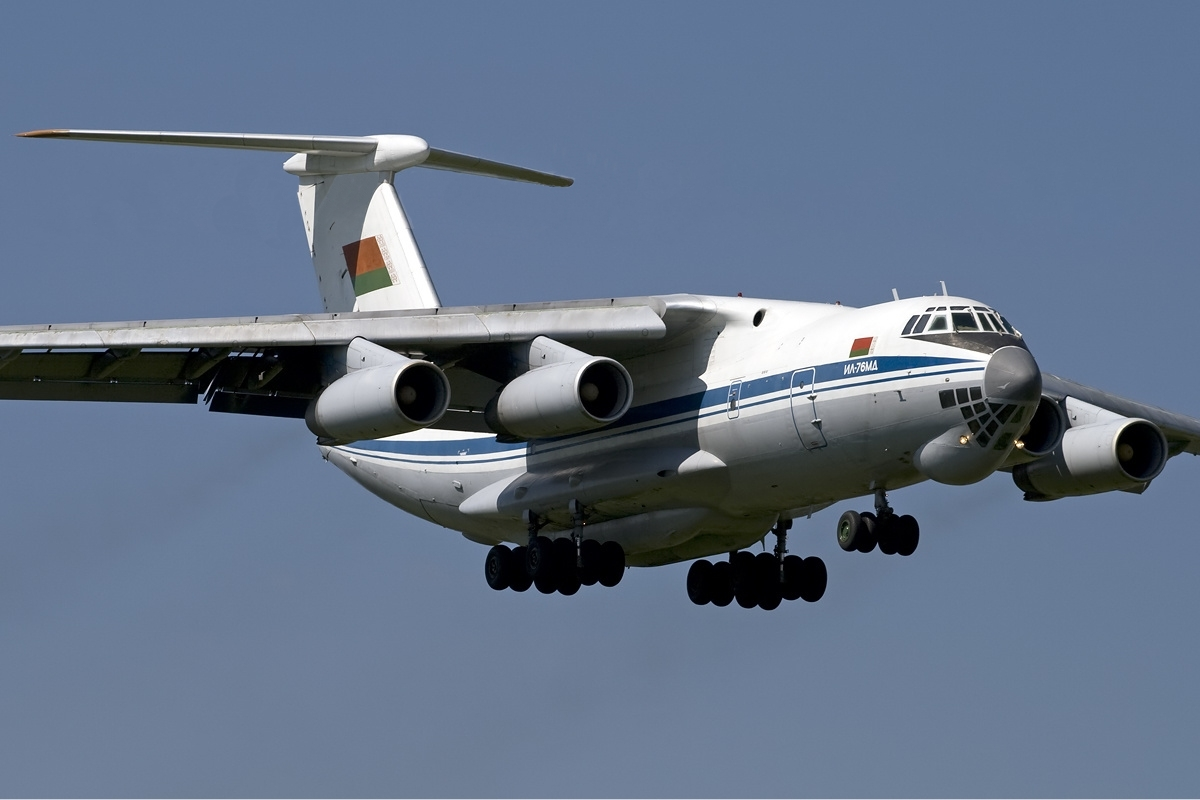
Belarus Air Force Il-76MD

The Air Force and Air Defence Forces of Belarus inherited a modest number of Il-76 aircraft from the 26th Air Army of the Soviet Air Forces. Many of these aircraft were either retired or transferred to civil operators. However, two modernised Il-76MD remain in service, allowing the small country to project power aboard.

- Air Force and Air Defence Forces of Belarus – 2 Il-76MD in service.
  - 50th Composite Air Base

==== China ====
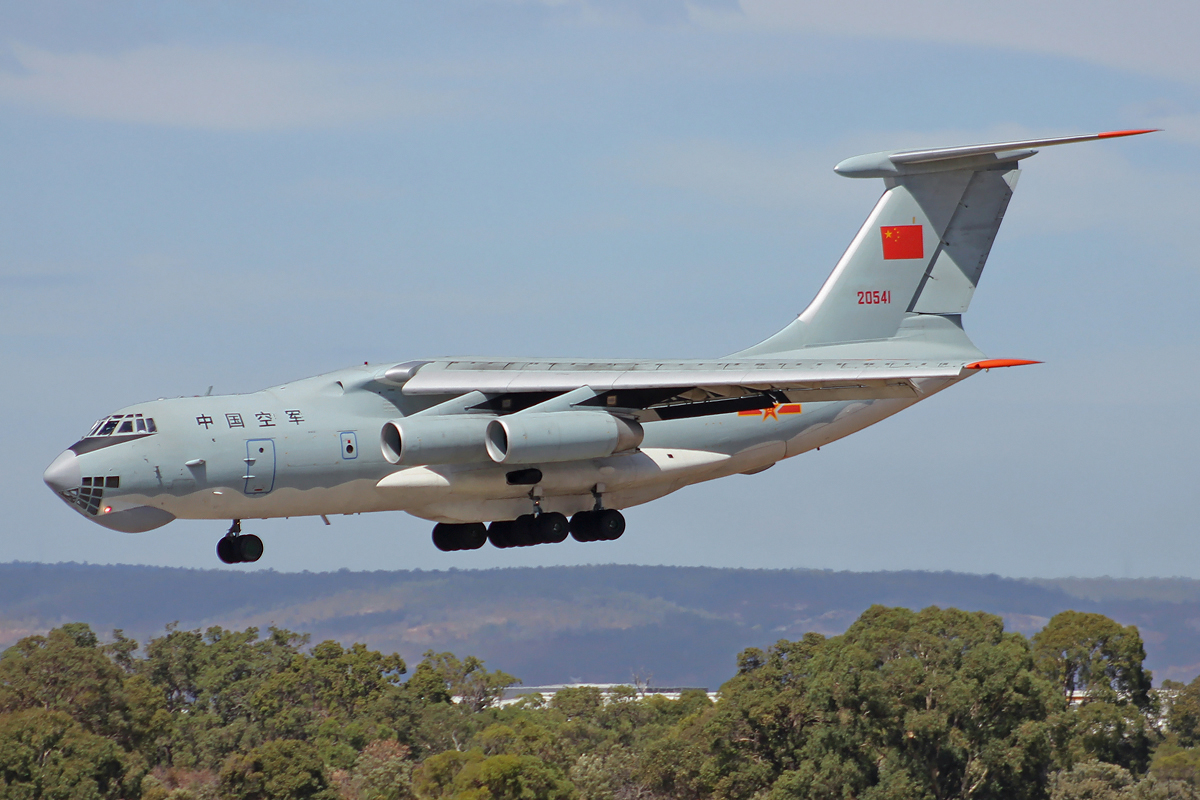
PLAAF Il-76TD

The People's Liberation Army Air Force ordered a number of aircraft in the years before and following the collapse of the Soviet Union. This included the delivery of several new Il-76TD and Il-76MD in the early 1990s. However, due to the collapse of the factory in Tashkent, this was supplemented by further delivery of used Il-76MD from Russia, Belarus and Ukraine. Aircraft were also delivered to Chinese civil operators such as China United Airlines.

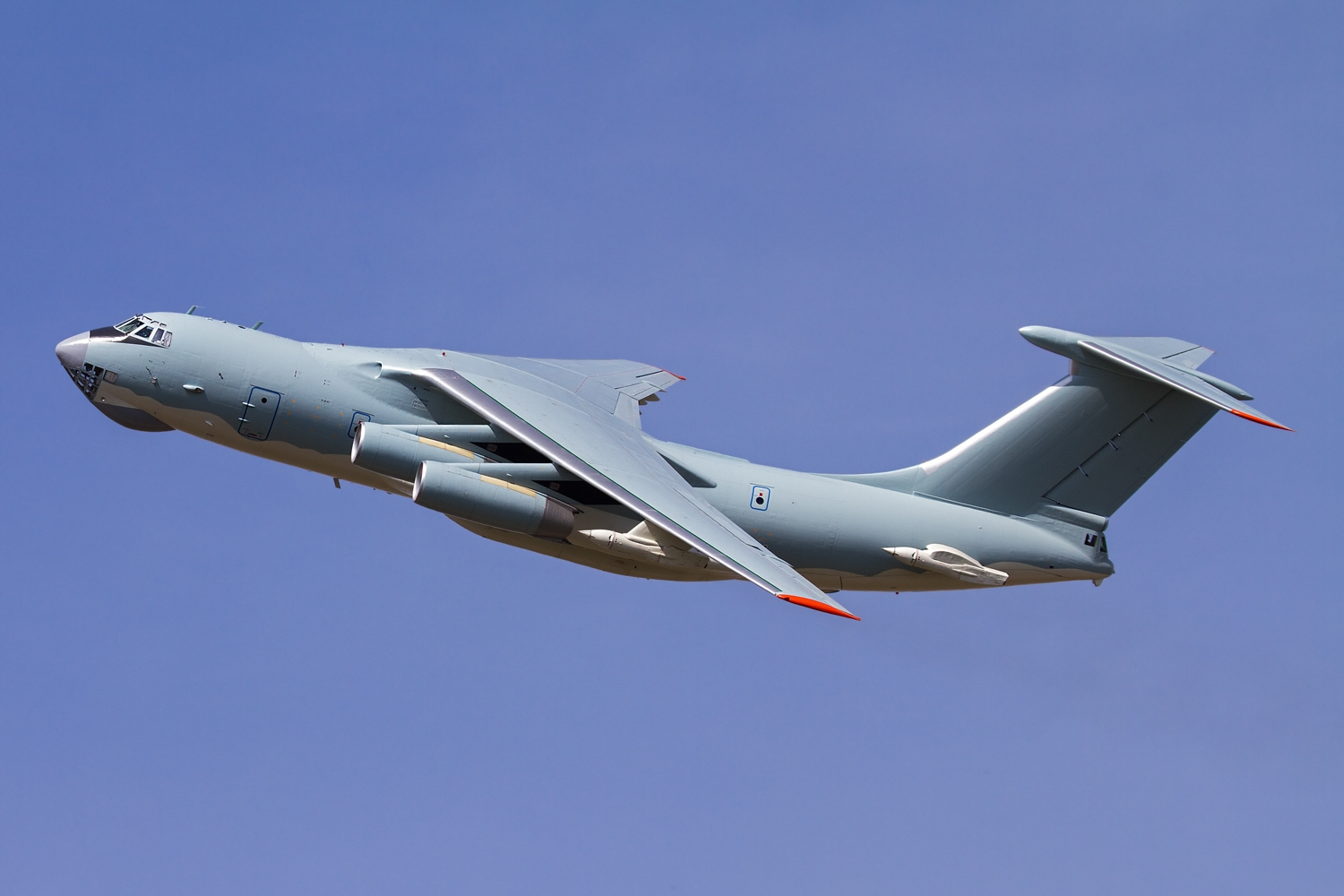
PLAAF Il-78M

Three overhauled Il-78M tanker aircraft equipped with UPAZ-1 refueling pods were ordered from Ukraine in 2011. These were delivered between 2014 and 2016, after being overhauled at the Nikolaev Aircraft Repair Plant (NARP). Shortly after delivery, the aircraft experienced mechanical issues, resulting in them being flown to Russia for further repair work. These aircraft can be seconded to the People's Liberation Army Navy Air Force depending on operational requirements.

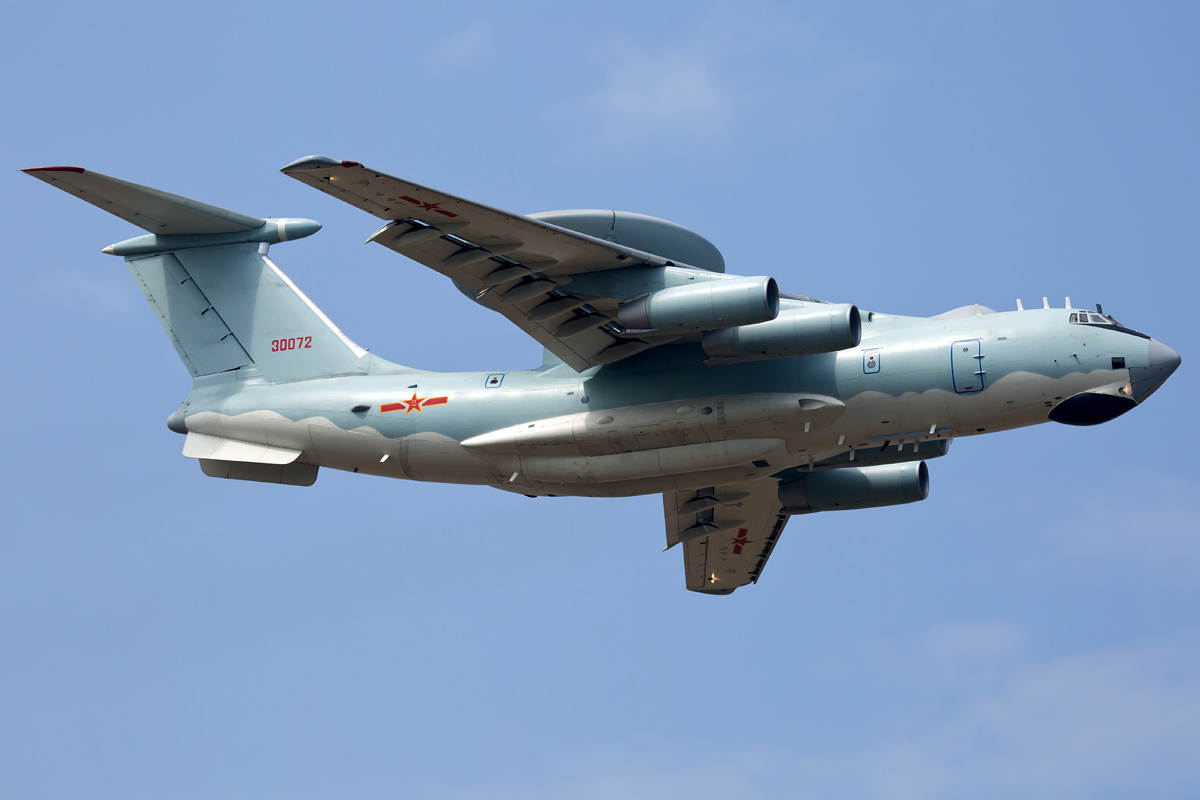
PLAAF KJ-2000

In 1999, China signed a contract with Israel and Russia for an order of four A-50EI aircraft equipped with the Israeli EL/M-2075 Phalcon radar. Following pressure from the United States, the deal was cancelled by Israel in 2000. Nonetheless, a single A-50 airframe was delivered to China. While the aircraft never entered operational service, it proved useful as a testbed aircraft for the development of a domestic Chinese AESA radar. As of 2025, this aircraft remains in service with the China Flight Test Establishment as an engine testbed. Denied of import options, China then went on to develop a domestic AWACS and the first Shaanxi KJ-2000 aircraft made its maiden flight in 2003, based on former aircraft that were operated by China United Airlines.

China has since prioritised the development of the domestic Xi'an Y-20 Kunpeng as a replacement for the aging Il-76 aircraft.

- People's Liberation Army Air Force – 26 Il-76MD / Il-76TD, 3 Il-78M, and 4 KJ-2000 in service.
  - 39th Air Regiment
  - 77th Air Regiment

==== Republic of the Congo ====
- Government of the Republic of Congo

==== Democratic Republic of the Congo ====
The Congolese Air Force has operated the Il-76 since at least 2002. The fleet of aircraft support both military and cargo transport, as well as United Nations flights operating in the country. Due to a limited pool of experienced flight crew, pilots are contracted from countries of the former Soviet Union.

The delivery of another Il-76TD from Belarus took place in 2023.

- Air Force of the Democratic Republic of the Congo – 3 Il-76TD in service.

==== Egypt ====
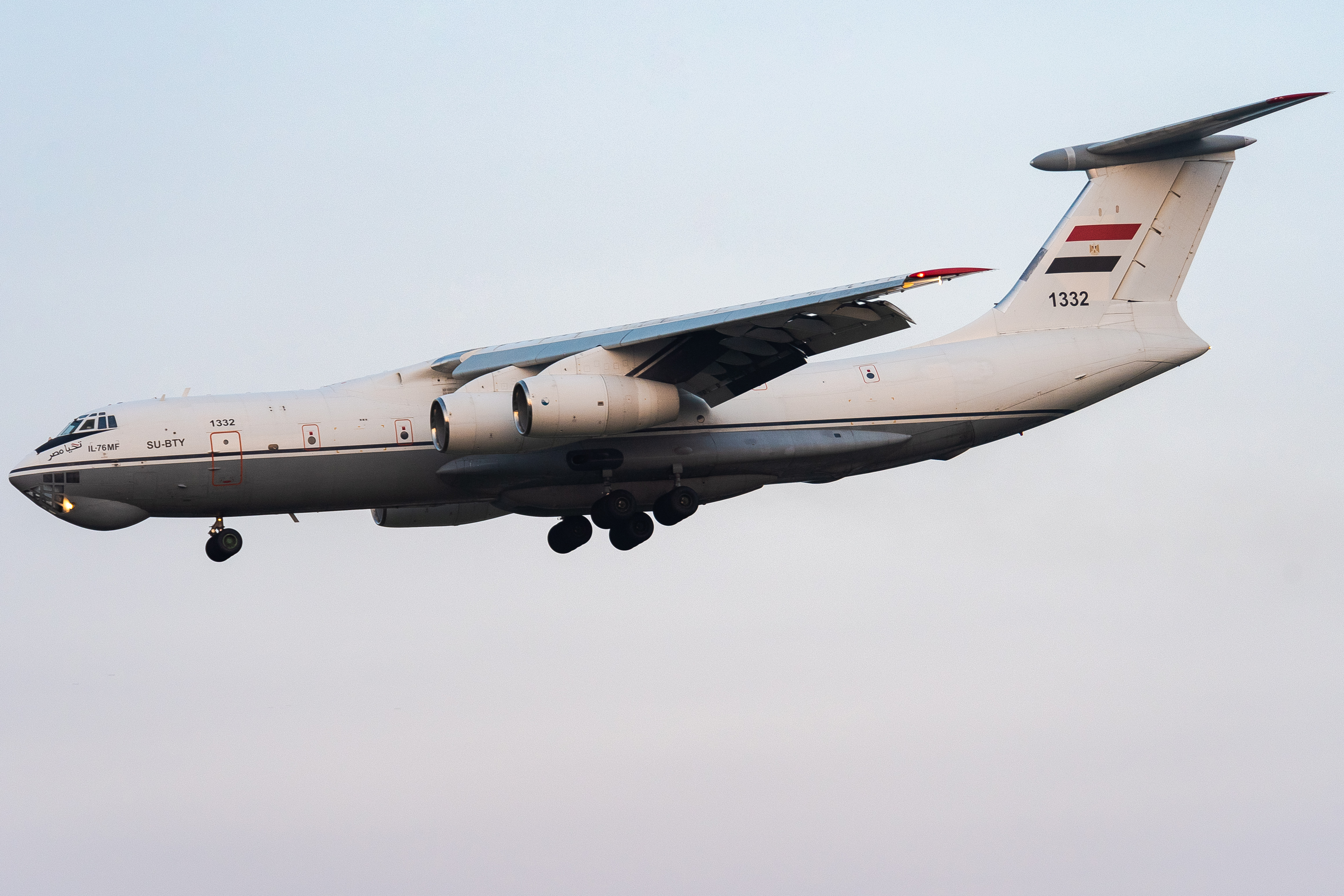
Egyptian Air Force Il-78MF

The Egyptian Air Force operates two Il-76MF aircraft, acquired second hand from Jordan in 2019. Stretched military version with a 6.6 m (22 ft) longer fuselage, PS-90A-76 engines, maximum takeoff weight of 210 t (460,000 lb) and a lift capability of 60 t (130,000 lb).

- Egyptian Air Force – 2 Il-76MF in service.
  - 516th Air Wing

==== Equatorial Guinea ====
In 2022, a single Il-76TD-90 aircraft was acquired from Belarus, formerly operated by Rubystar Airways. The aircraft is equipped with modern Aviadvigatel PS-90 engines, and is operated for government cargo services.

- Equatorial Guinea National Guard – 1 Il-76TD-90 in service.

==== India ====
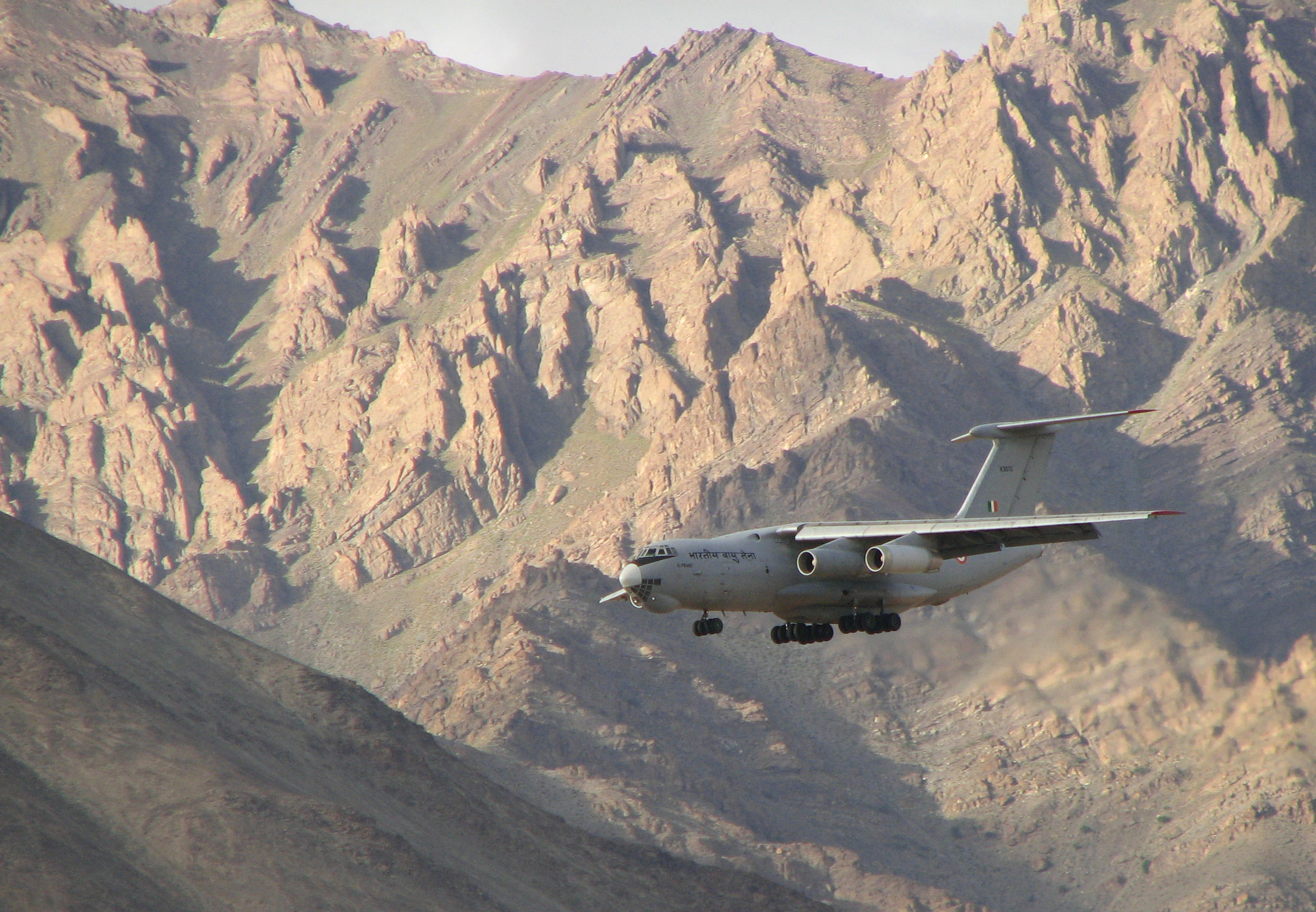
IAF Il-76MD landing at Kushok Bakula Rimpochee Airport, Leh – one of the highest airports in the world.

The Il-76, along with the later Boeing C-17 Globemaster forms the backbone of the Indian Air Force strategic aviation fleet. In 1983, the Indian government signed an order with the Soviet Union for 17 new build Il-76MD aircraft, to be produced at the Tashkent Aviation Production Association. Deliveries took place between 1985 and 1989. As of 2025, all originally delivered aircraft remain in service, with zero losses over a time period of 40 years. In 2024, the Indian Air Force issued a RFP to Russia for a life extension program for the aircraft, consisting of upgrades to MD-90A standards (PS-90A engines, glass cockpit, tail gun removal). In Indian service, the Il-76 is nicknamed Gajraj, "King Elephant".

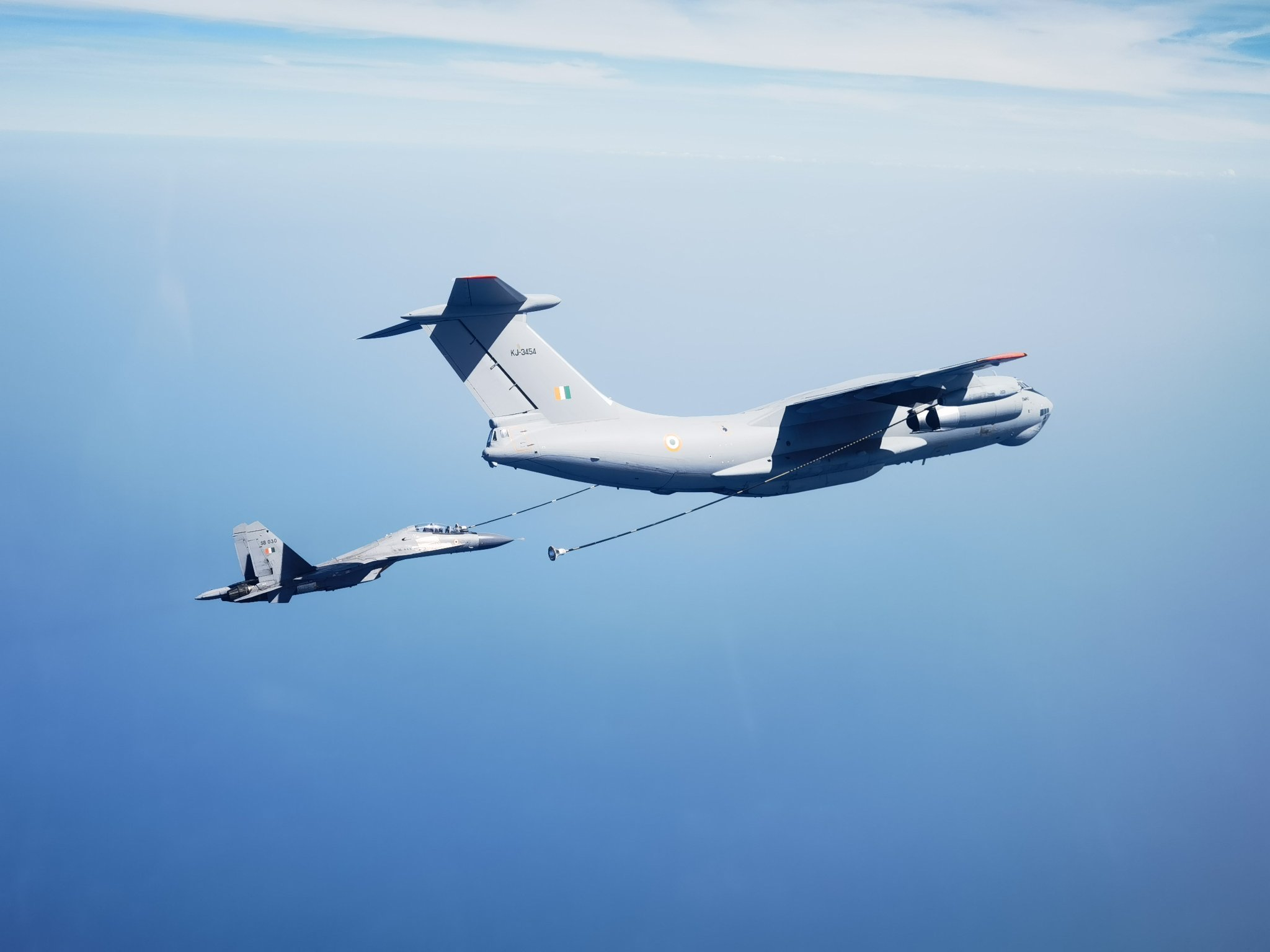
IAF Il-78MKI refueling a Sukhoi Su-30MKI.

In the early 2000s, following the acquisition of the Sukhoi Su-30MKI, the IAF wished to acquire a tanker aircraft. While the IAF occasionally made use of buddy refueling, it had never operated a dedicated tanker. In 2001, a deal was signed between India and Uzbekistan for 6 Il-78MKI aircraft, built using airframes that had remained unfinished due to the collapse of the Soviet Union. Additional components were also ordered from Russia, which were then assembled in Tashkent. The aircraft, delivered between 2003 and 2004 are equipped with Cobham Mk.32B refueling pods to allow for the refueling of both NATO and Russian origin aircraft in Indian service. The IAF is currently seeking a replacement in order to allow the existing probe and drogue system, as well as boom refueling support for the C-17 and P-8I.

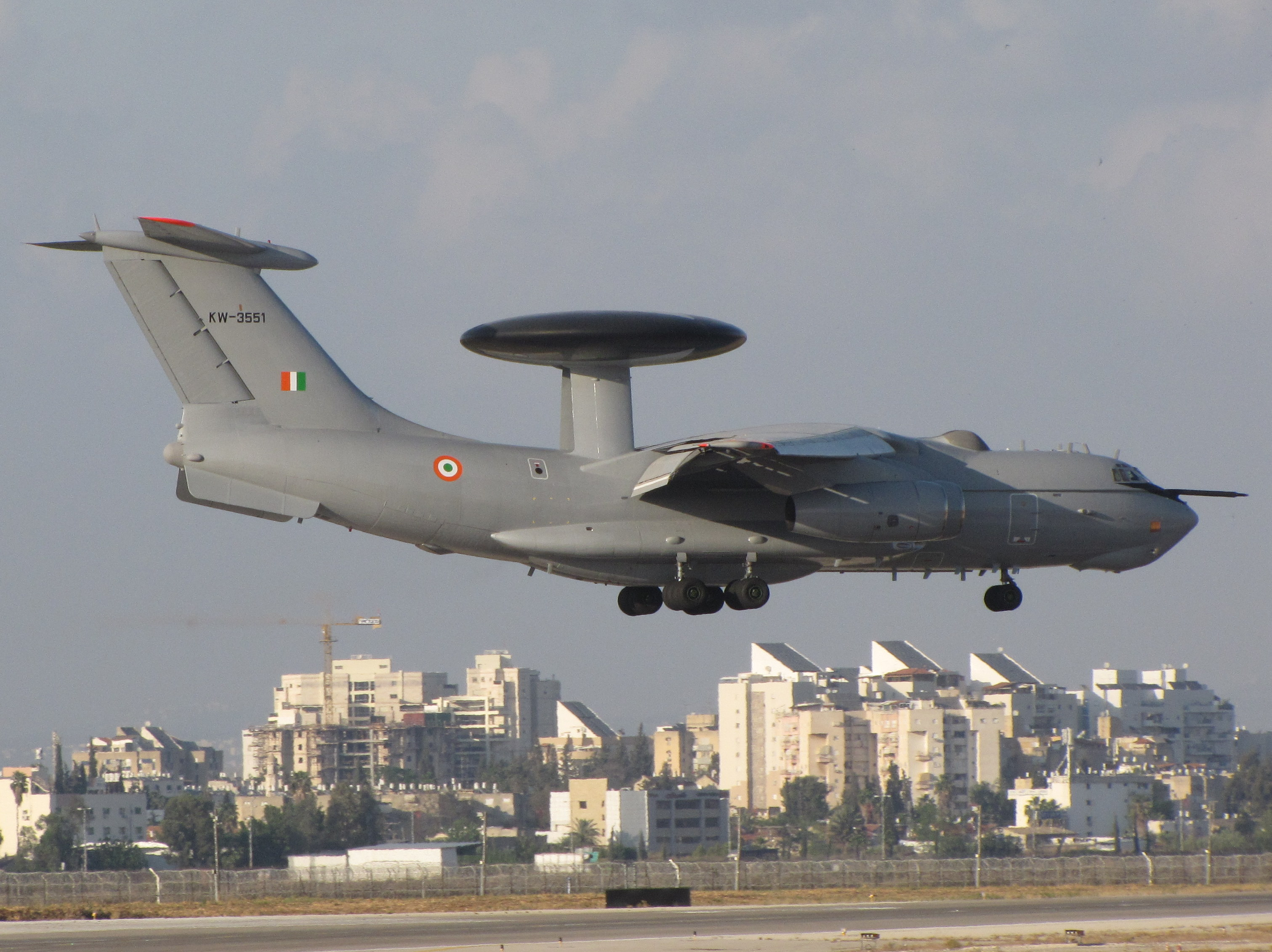
A-50EI of the Indian Air Force

The Beriev A-50EI is the primary Airborne Early Warning & Control aircraft of the Indian Air Force. In 2000, India conducted trials of the A-50, making the decision to acquire 3 aircraft from Russia's Beriev, but to equip the aircraft with the EL/W-2090 radar developed by Israel Aerospace Industries and Elta Electronics Industries of Israel. While the deal was initially blocked by the United States, restrictions were eventually released. The delivery of three aircraft equipped with glass cockpits, fly-by-wire controls and PS-90 engines were delivered between 2009 and 2010. Indian Air Force

- Indian Air Force – 17 Il-76MD, 6 Il-78MKI, and 3 A-50EI in service. 2 A-50EI on order.

Current

- No. 44 Squadron IAF "Mighty Jets" (Il-76)
- No. 50 Squadron IAF "Peerless" (A-50)
- No. 78 Squadron IAF "Battle Cry" (Il-78)

Former

- No. 25 Squadron IAF "Himalayan Eagles" (Il-76)

Research & Analysis Wing

- Aviation Research Centre

National Centre for Polar and Ocean Research

Additional Il-76 aircraft, typically chartered from Russian carriers, are available for Antarctic flight services through Indian participation in the Dronning Maud Land Air Network.

==== Iran ====
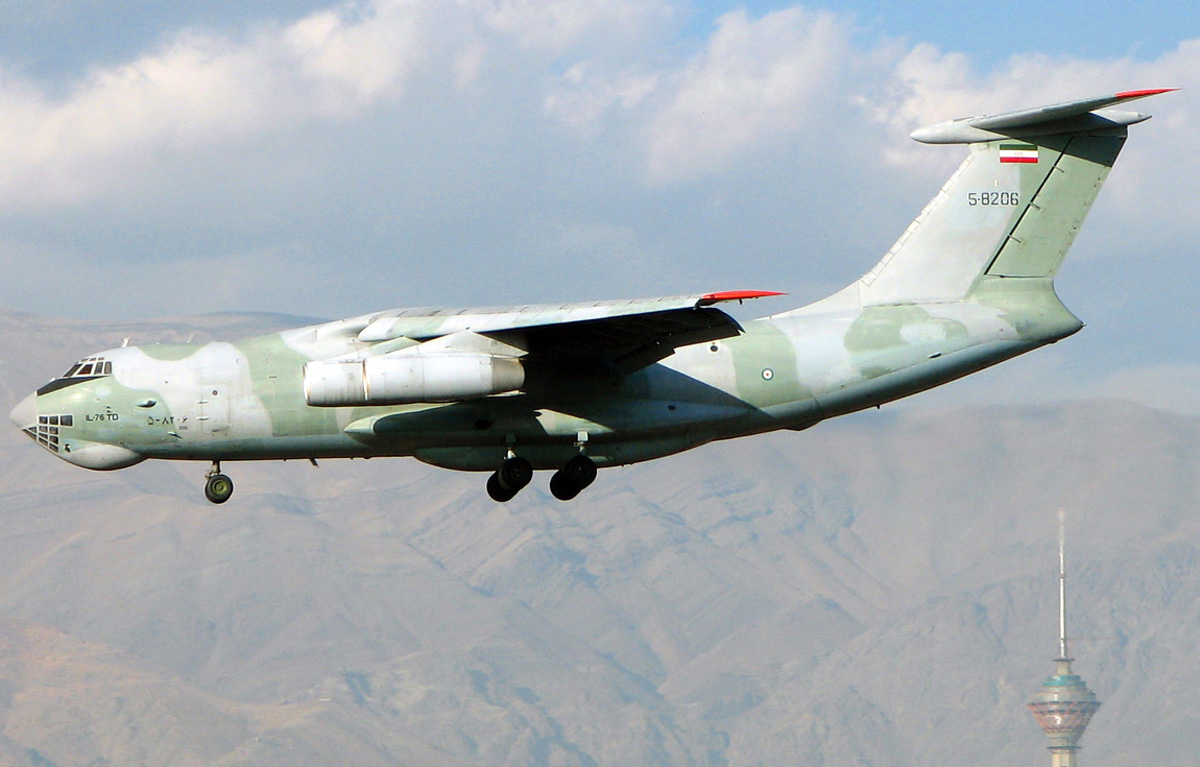
Islamic Republic of Iran Air Force Il-76TD

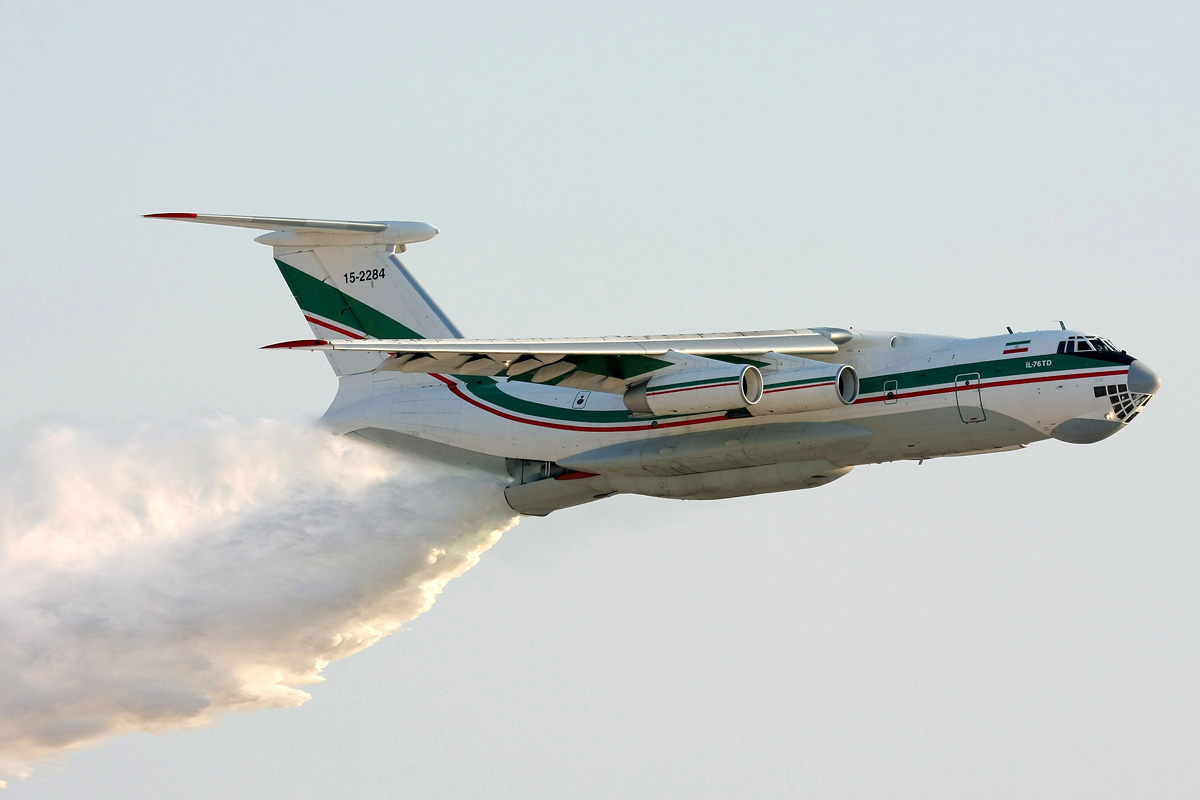
Il-76 waterbomber of the Islamic Revolutionary Guards Corps Aerospace Force

The Il-76 entered operational service in Iran following the mass defection of Iraqi aircraft as a result of Operation Desert Storm. These included both Iraqi Air Force Il-76MD military aircraft, as well as dual use Il-76TD's operated by Iraqi Airways. While these aircraft primarily included standard transport aircraft, the rare Baghdad-1 and Baghdad-2 AWACS aircraft were among the defected. While Iraq attempted to recover the aircraft, they were seized by Iran as compensation for the Iran-Iraq War.

Baghdad-1 had its AWACS modifications removed, and remains in service with the Iranian Air Force in 2025.

Baghdad-2 underwent further modifications, receiving the designation "Simorgh". However, it was lost in a mid air collision in 2009 when it collided with a HESA Saeqeh fighter jet near Tehran.

The fleet of aircraft officially property of the IRIAF, and are transferred to the IRGC based on operational requirements.

- Islamic Republic of Iran Air Force – 6 Il-76TD in service.
  - 73rd Tactical Airlift Squadron
- Islamic Revolutionary Guards Corps Aerospace Force – 3 Il-76MD / Il-76TD in service.

==== Jordan ====
The Royal Jordanian Air Force has intermittently operated the Il-76 since the early 2000s. While nominally owned by the air force, they are operated by Jordan International Air Cargo.

In 2005, two used Il-76TD aircraft were acquired from Kyrgyzstan. These did not stay in service long and were retired by 2014.

Following this, two stretched Il-76MF aircraft were delivered from Uzbekistan. These were operated from 2006 to 2019, before being sold to Egypt.

In August 2023, the RJAF reintroduced the Il-76 into service with the delivery of a single former Azerbaijani Il-76TD in order to facilitate the transfer of military equipment between Jordan and Ukraine, via Poland and the United Kingdom.

In March 2013, The New York Times reported that Jordan International Air Cargo was a front organization for the Royal Jordanian Air Force and responsible for covertly flying arms to Turkey with assistance from the Central Intelligence Agency to aid Islamist rebels in the Syrian civil war.

- Royal Jordanian Air Force – 1 Il-76TD in service.
  - No. 3 Squadron RJAF (operated by Jordan International Air Cargo)

==== Mali ====
On 28 September 2023, a Malian Air Force Il-76 crashed at Gao International Airport, resulting in the loss of the aircraft.

In November 2026, the Malian Air Force took delivery of another Il-76, as well as several Mi-8M and Mi-24 helicopters.

- Malian Air Force

==== North Korea (Korea DPR) ====
In 1990, three Il-76TD aircraft were delivered to the Civil Aviation Administration of Korea (CAAK), which became Air Koryo in 1992. While registered as airline cargo freighters, the aircraft retain a dual use for military purposes.

As of 2025, the Korean People's Army Air Force operates a single modified Il-76MD equipped with a triangular airborne early warning radar. The interior of the aircraft is configured for battlefield control, with several rows of consoles facing a large display.

- Korean People's Army Air Force – 1 modified Il-76TD for AEW&C

More cargo aircraft are operated by Air Koryo as freighter aircraft.

==== Pakistan ====
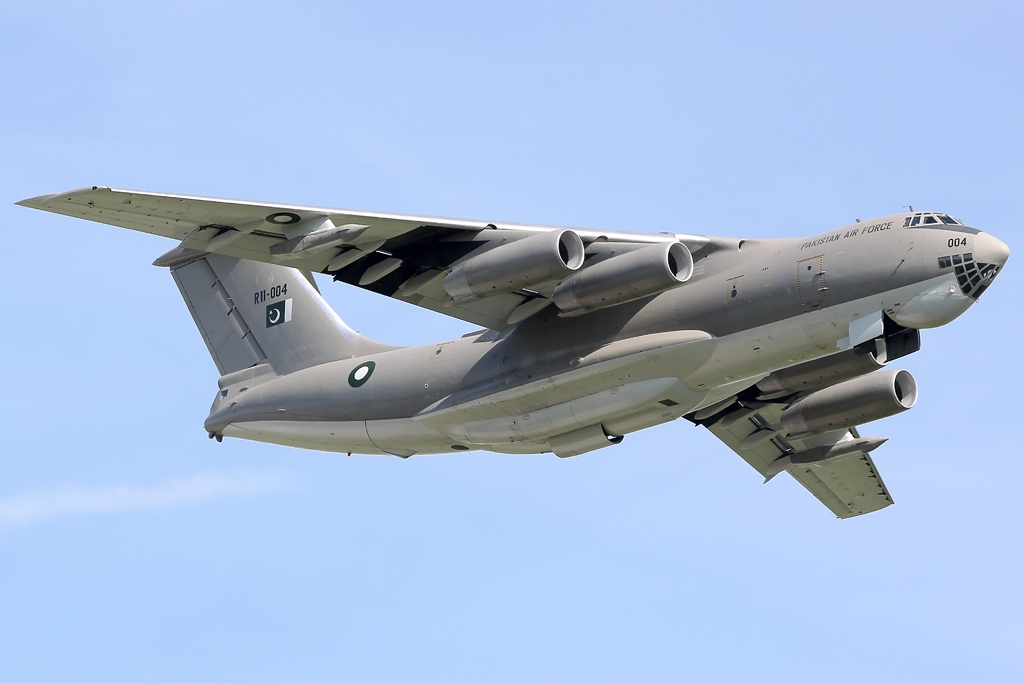
Pakistan Air Force Il-78MP

The Il-78MP serves as the sole aerial refueling aircraft of the Pakistan Air Force, operated by No. 10 Squadron PAF, based at PAF Base Nur Khan, Rawalpindi. Pakistan ordered four ex Soviet Il-78 aircraft from Ukraine in 2006. The aircraft were overhauled and equipped with removable fuel tanks alongside UPAZ-1 aerial refueling pods.

- Pakistan Air Force – 4 Il-78MP in service.
  - No. 10 Squadron PAF

==== Russian Federation ====
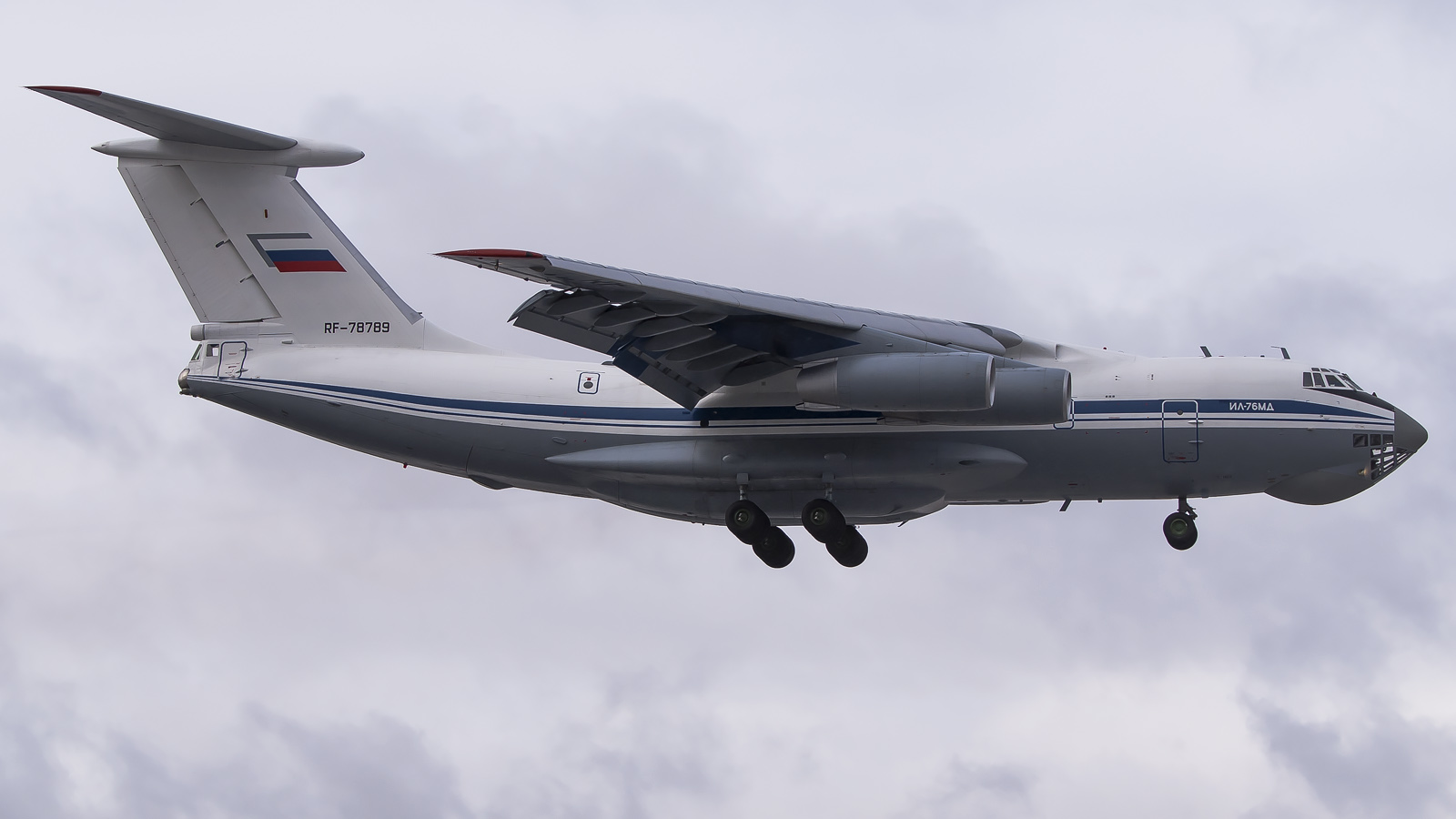
Russian Air Force Il-76MD

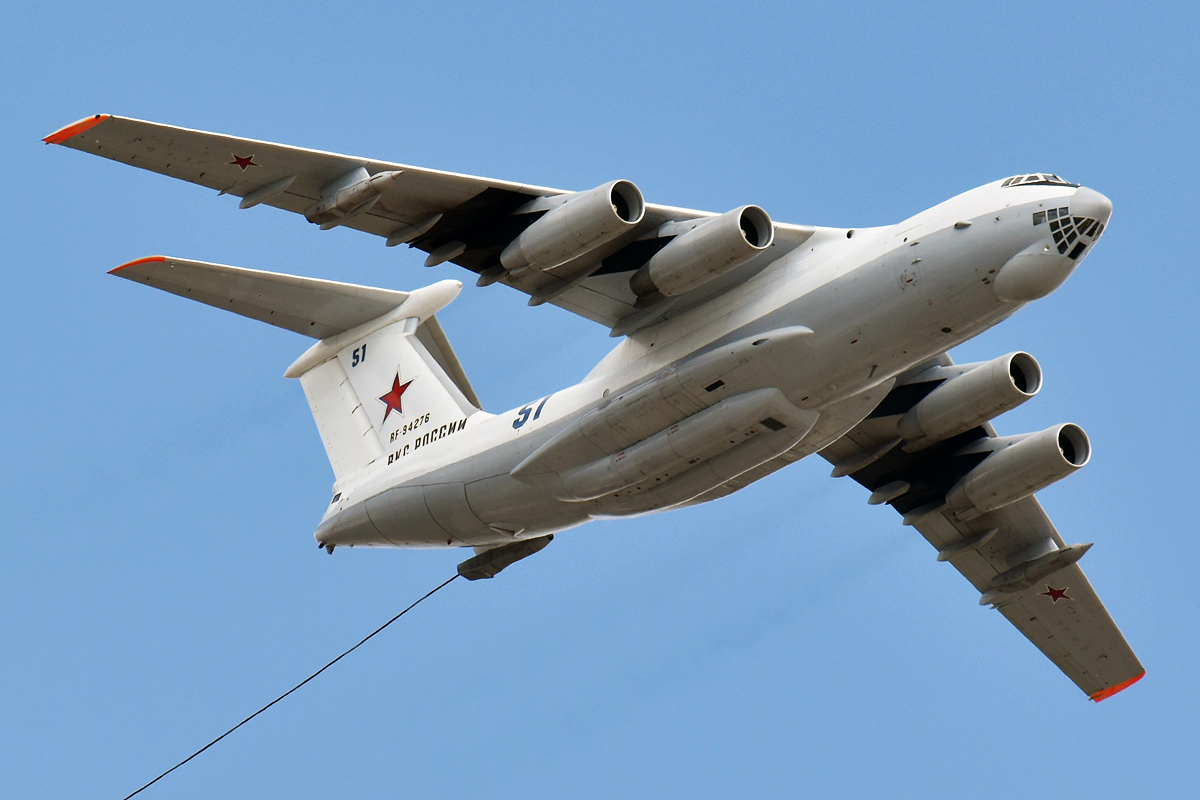
Russian Air Force Il-78M

The Ilyushin Il-76 is the primary strategic airlifter for the Russian Air Force. After the dissolution of the Soviet Union, Russia inherited hundreds of aircraft which had been manufactured at the Tashkent Aviation Production Association. However, during the troublesome 1990s, many aircraft were sold to private operators or as export orders.

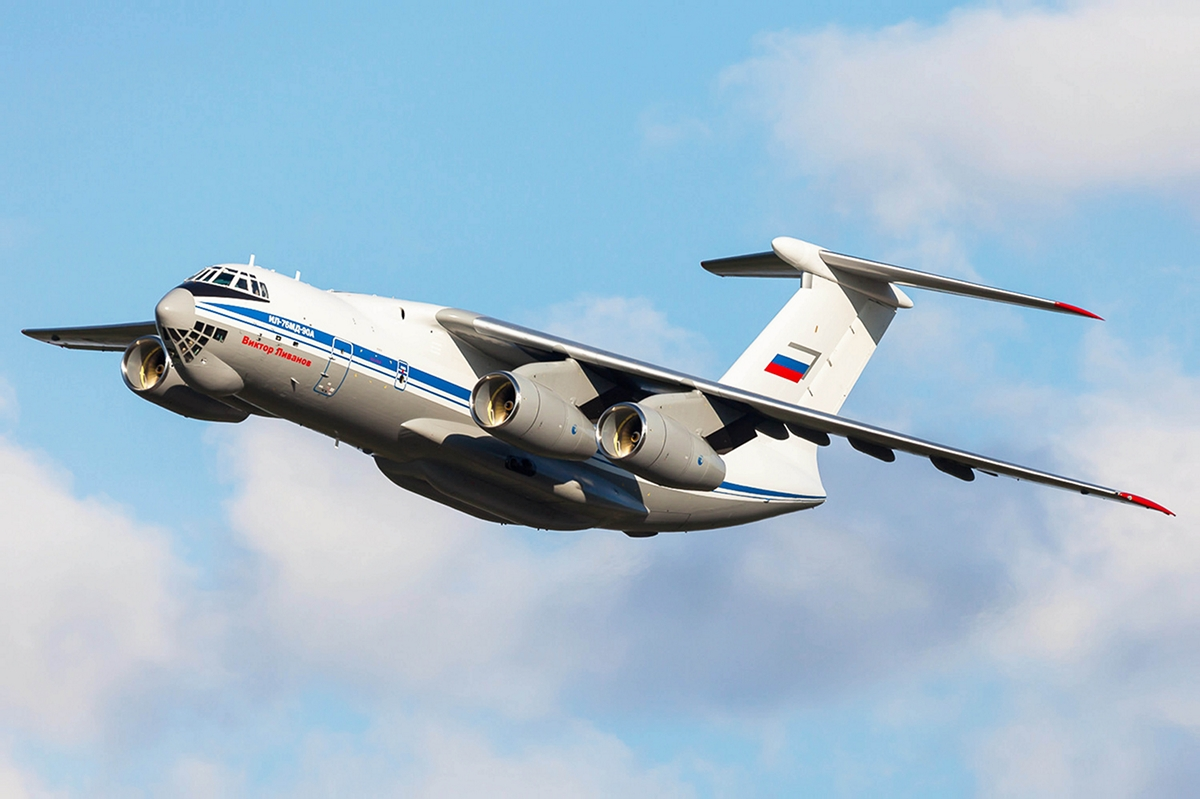
A Russian Air Force Il-76MD-90A.

As of 2025, about a hundred aircraft remain in service. Production of a modernised variant of the aircraft, namely the Il-76/78MD-90A was restarted at Aviastar-SP, which replaces the older D-30 engines with more efficient PS-90 engines, along with a glass cockpit and improved performance.

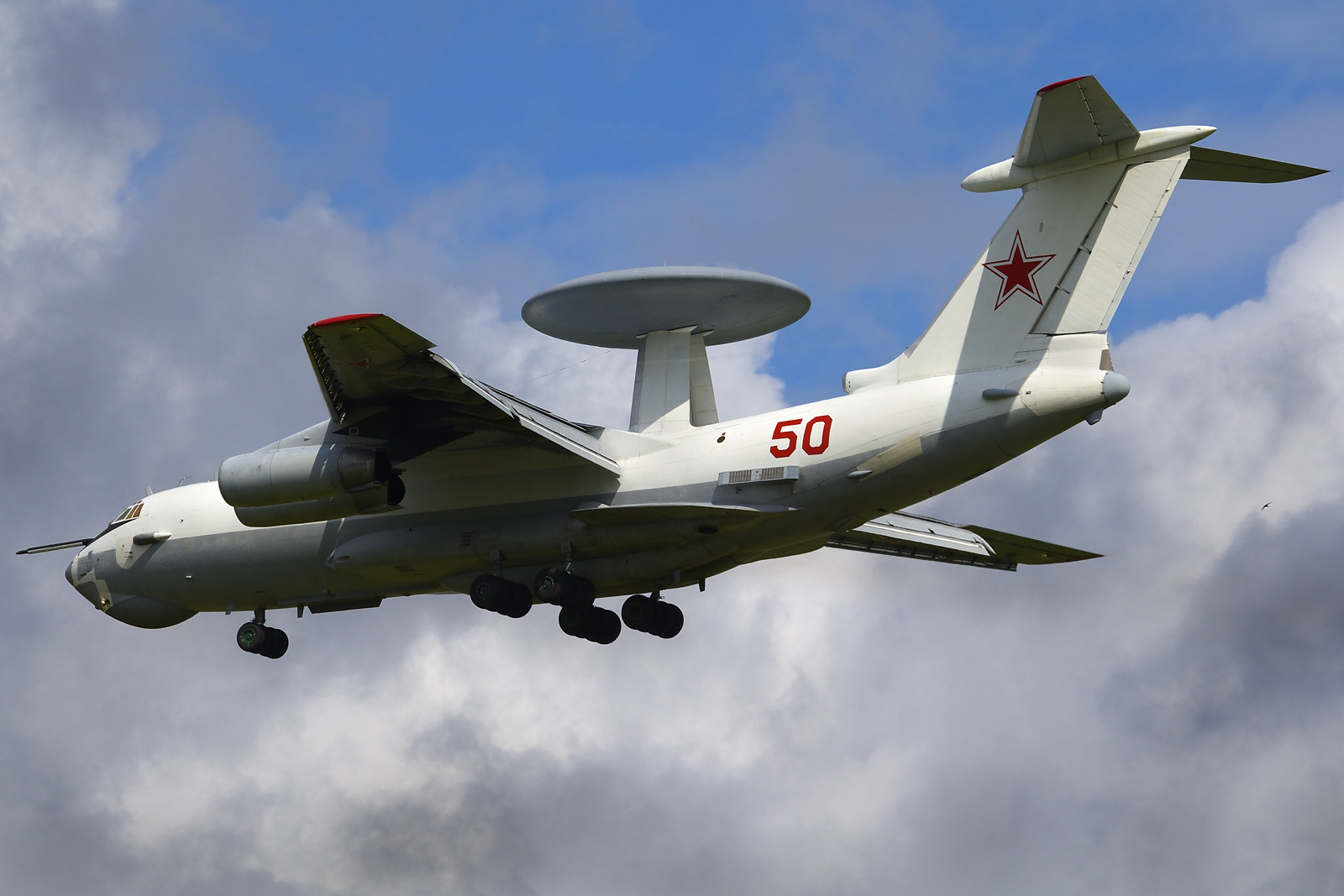
Russian Air Force A-50U

Approximately 40 A-50 aircraft, based in the Il-76 were built by Beriev from 1984 to 1992. Approximately a dozen aircraft remain in service today. In 2024, the conversion of new aircraft was considered, using Il-76MD-90A fuselages.

Russian Air Force

- Russian Aerospace Forces – Approximately 130 Il-76, 19 Il-78 and 12 A-50/A-100 in service. 7 Il-76MD-90A, 31 Il-78M-90A on order. More in reserve storage.
  - 4th Centre for Combat Application and Crew Training
  - 8th Military Transport Aviation Regiment
  - 117th Military Transport Aviation Regiment
  - 144th Airborne Early Warning Aviation Regiment
  - 196th Military Transport Aviation Regiment
  - 203rd Aircraft Refueling Aviation Regiment
  - 223rd Flight Detachment
  - 224th Flight Detachment
  - 235th Military Transport Aviation Regiment
  - 334th Military Transport Aviation Regiment (Il-76)
  - 353rd Special Purpose Aviation Regiment
  - 600th Military Transport Aviation Regiment
  - 610th Combat Training and Aircrew Conversion Centre
  - 708th Military Transport Aviation Regiment
  - 929th State Flight Test Centre named for V. P. Chkalov

National Guard

The National Guard of Russia operates a fleet of aircraft for the rapid deployment of internal service troops, disaster response and VIP/security flights. All aircraft in use are former Soviet aircraft, but have been modernised to extend their lifespan.

- National Guard of Russia – 9 Il-76M / Il-76MD in service.

Border Service

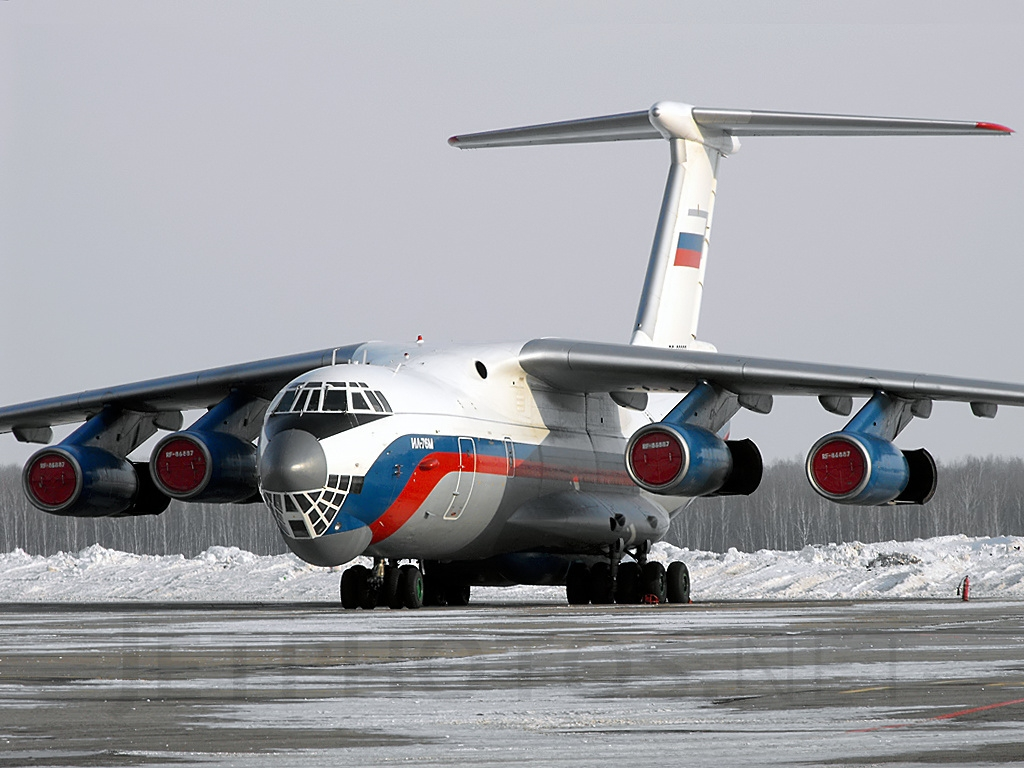
Russian Border Service Il-76M

The Border Service of the Federal Security Service maintains a small number of aircraft to assist in deployment to remote sections of the Russian border.

- Border Service of the Federal Security Service of the Russian Federation – 3 Il-76TD in service

EMERCOM

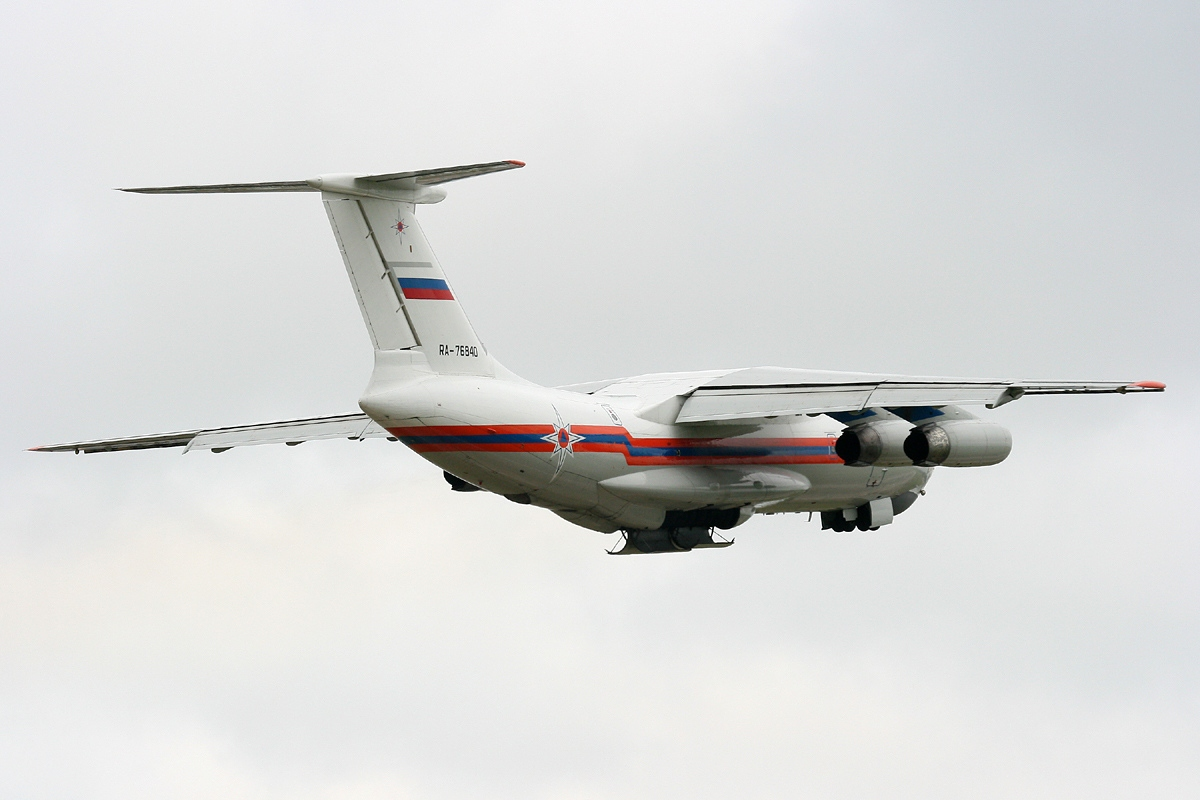
EMERCOM Russia Il-76TD

The Russian Ministry of Emergency Situations (EMERCOM) maintains a fleet of aircraft for disaster relief, fire-fighting and medical evacuations. Firefighting aircraft can be equipped with twin VAP-2 drop tanks, capable of holding 42,000 L of fire retardant each. When configured for medical evacuation, aircraft have the capacity for over one-hundred stretchers. As of late 2025, aircraft will begin to receive upgrades in the form of PS-90A-76 engines, as well as the delivery of new-build Il-76TD-90A aircraft in mid 2026.

- Ministry of Civil Defence, Emergencies and Disaster Relief (EMERCOM) – 6 to 7 Il-76TD in service

Arctic and Antarctic Research Institute

Aircraft are available for Antarctic flight services through Russian participation in the Dronning Maud Land Air Network.

==== Sudan ====
The Sudanese Air Force has operated a small number of Il-76's since the 2000s, mainly acquired from Kyrgyzstan. Due to a limited pool of experienced flight crew, pilots are contracted from Russia or countries from Central Asia.

As of November 2025, it is unknown if any aircraft remain in operational service, due to losses incurred in the Sudanese civil war.

- Sudanese Air Force – 1 Il-76TD in service
  - 1st Transport Squadron

==== Ukraine ====
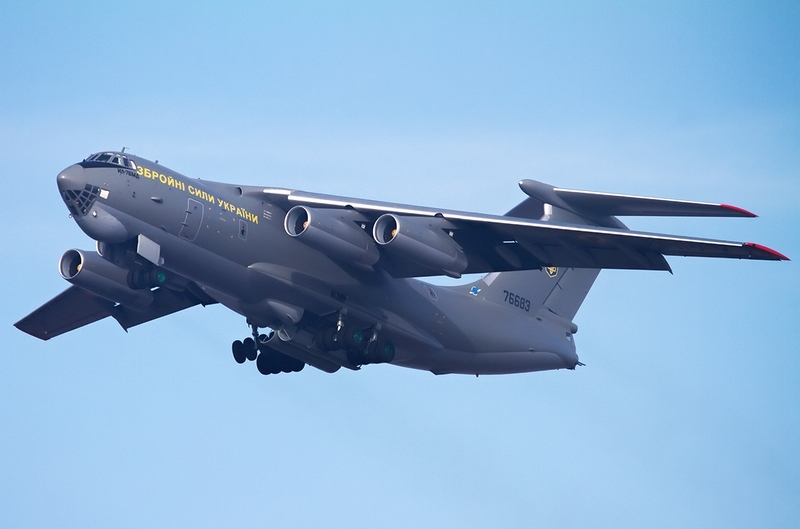
Ukrainian Air Force Il-76MD

Following the collapse of the Soviet Union, Ukraine inherited one of the largest fleets of Il-76 aircraft, making it the second largest operator at the time after Russia. It also inherited 20 Il-78 aerial tankers. Many of these aircraft were pressed into use by Babyflots, while others were exported to countries such as China and Pakistan. In addition, many aircraft were sold/leased to dozens of cargo operators in Africa, the Middle East and Central Asia, often linked to sanctions evasion networks. By 2021, only 7–10 aircraft remained in service with the 25th Transport Aviation Brigade, based in Melitopol.

Following the start of hostilities, seven Il-76MD aircraft were evacuated to Dęblin Air Base in Poland. However, a small number of clandestine flights are suspected to operate in Western Ukraine.

- Ukrainian Air Force – 7 Il-76MD in service
  - 25th Transport Aviation Brigade

==== Uzbekistan ====
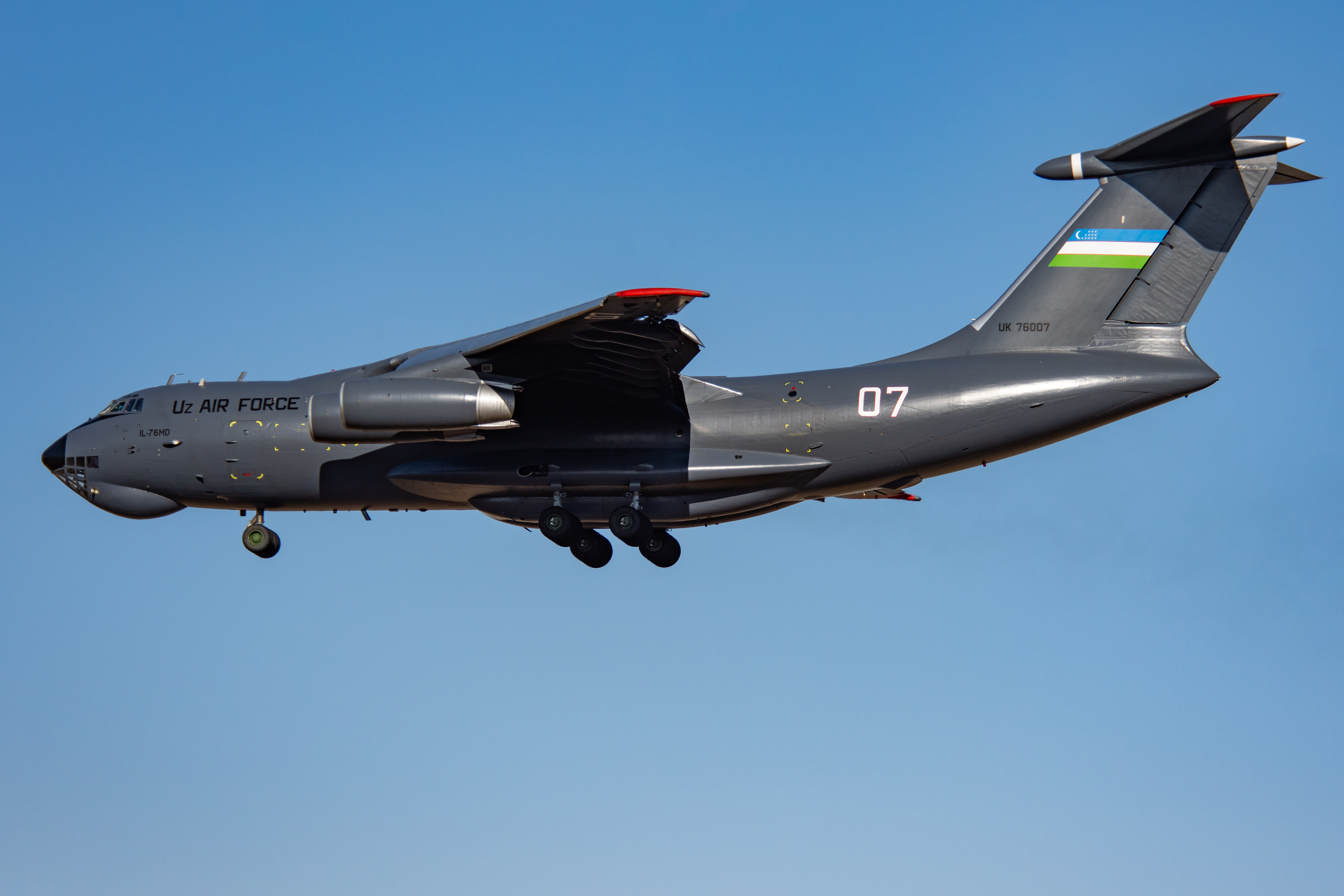
Uzbekistan Air and Air Defence Force Il-76MD

The Il-76 played a major role in the history of Uzbekistan and its predecessor the Uzbek SSR, with the majority of airframes being built at the Tashkent Aviation Production Organisation (TAPOiCh) prior to its shutdown. However, aircraft production has since switched to the Aviastar-SP plant based in Ulyanovsk, Russia.

Today the Uzbekistan Air and Air Defence Forces operates a small fleet of Il-76MD aircraft. Several more aircraft remain in service with private operators.

- Uzbekistan Air and Air Defence Forces – 3 Il-76MD in service.

=== Civil operators ===
==== Azerbaijan ====
- Silk Way Airlines

==== Belarus ====
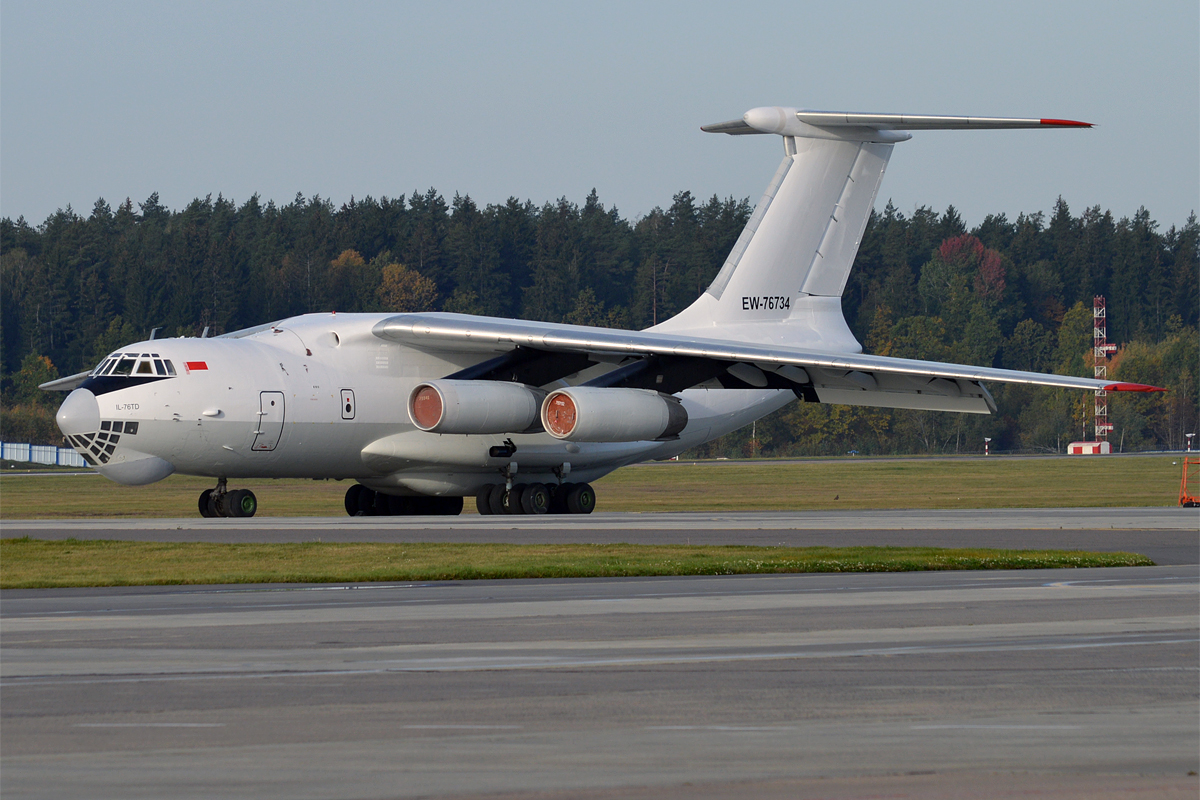
TransAVIAexport Airlines Il-76TD

- Belcanto Airlines
- Rubystar Airways
- TransAVIAexport Airlines

==== Burkina Faso ====
- Liz Aviation

==== Iran ====
- Pouya Air

==== Kazakhstan ====
- Kaz Air Trans

==== North Korea ====
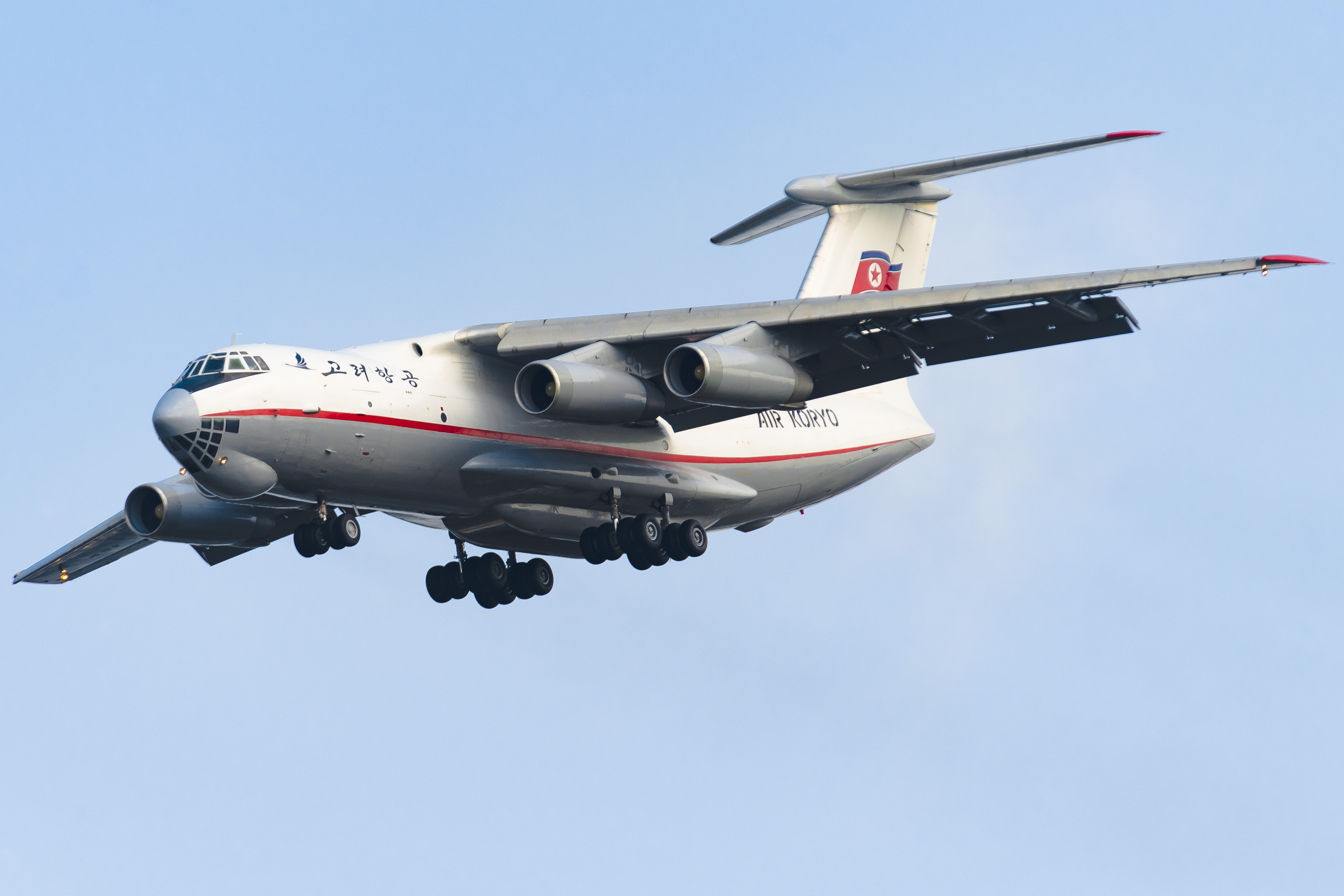
Air Koryo Il-76MD

- Air Koryo

==== Kyrgyzstan ====
- Fly Sky Airlines
- MAK.KG Airlines
- Sapsan Airlines
- SkyLine

==== Malawi ====
- Zebu Air

==== Russia ====
Gromov Flight Research Institute

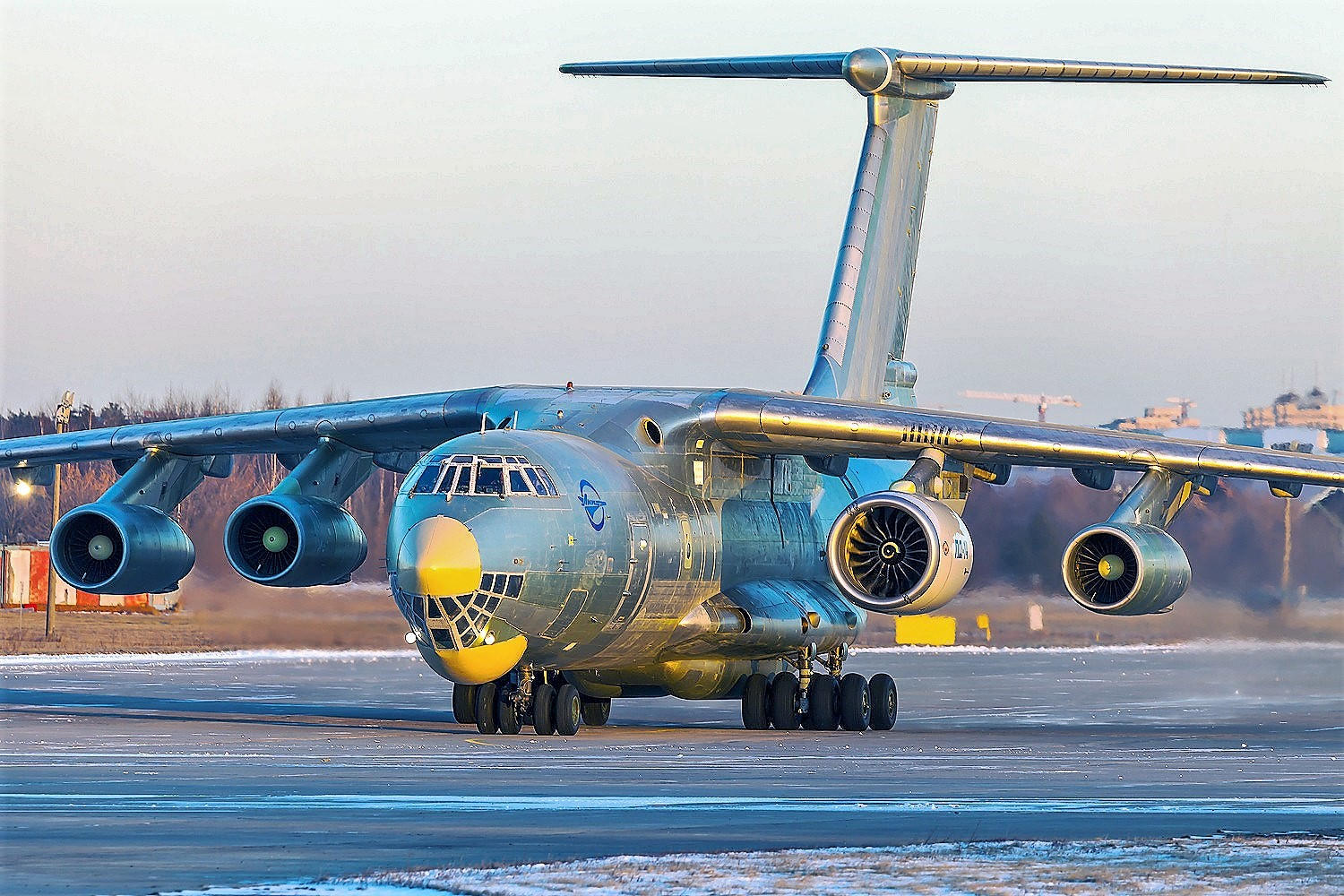
Gromov Flight Research Institute Il-76LL with attached Aviadvigatel PD-14 engine undergoing testing.

The Gromov Flight Research Institute operates a fleet of Il-76LL engine testbed aircraft.

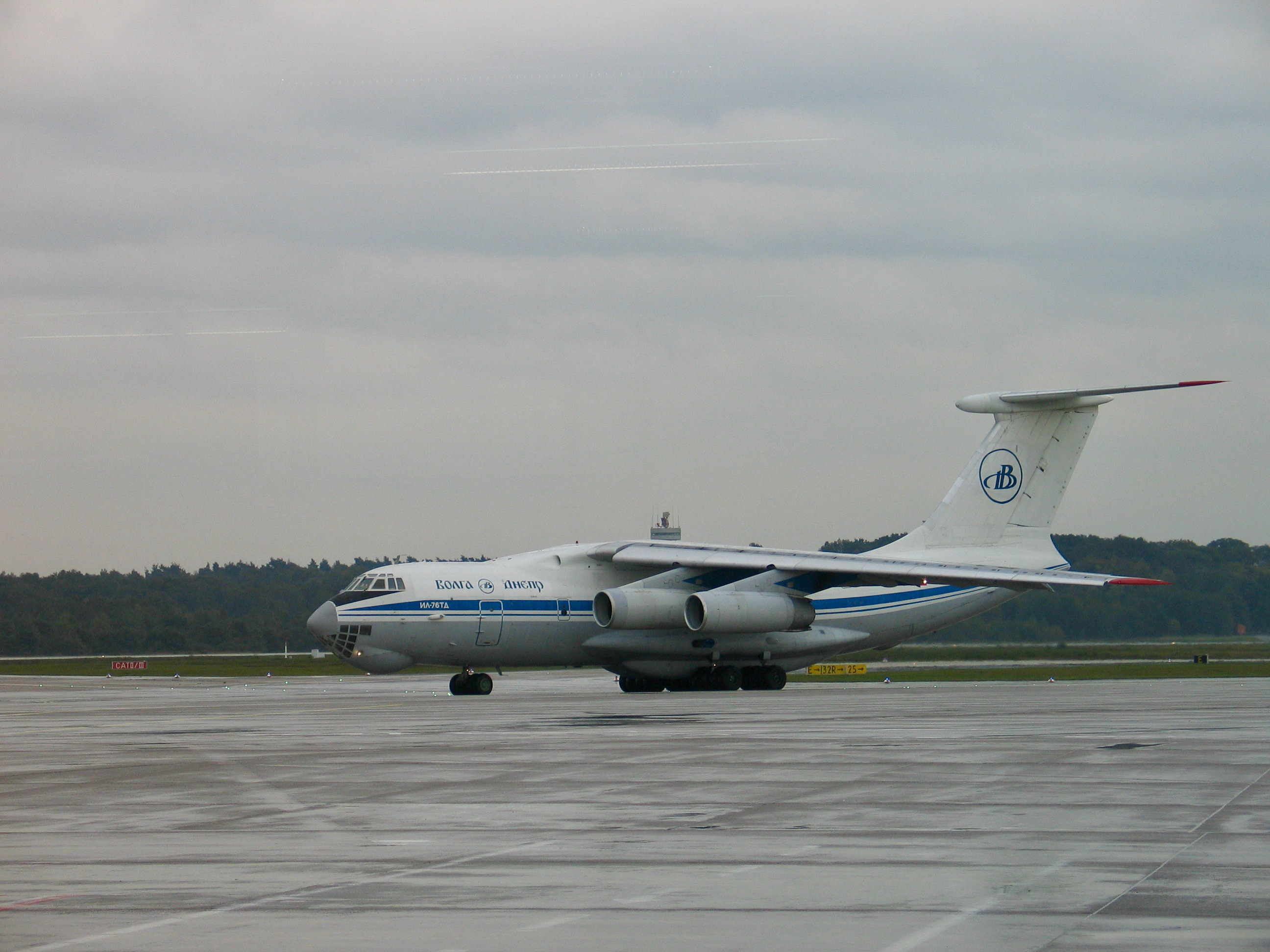
Volga-Dnepr Airlines Il-76TD-90

- Aviacon Zitotrans
- Gelix Airlines
- Kosmos Airlines
- Roscosmos
- Sky Gates Airlines
- Volga-Dnepr Airlines

==== Ba'athist Syria ====
- Syrian Air

==== Turkmenistan ====
- Turkmenistan Airlines

==== United Arab Emirates ====
- Maximus Air

==== Ukraine ====
- ZetAvia

== Former operators ==
=== Military operators ===
==== Iraq ====
- Iraqi Air Force

==== Yemen ====
- Yemeni Air Force

==== Soviet Union ====
Soviet Air Forces

- Soviet Air Forces
  - Military Transport Aviation
    - 25th Military Transport Aviation Regiment
    - 37th Military Transport Aviation Regiment
    - 110th Military Transport Aviation Regiment
    - 128th Military Transport Aviation Regiment
    - 175th Military Transport Aviation Regiment
    - 196th Military Transport Aviation Regiment
    - 334th Military Transport Aviation Regiment
    - 338th Military Transport Aviation Regiment
    - 339th Military Transport Aviation Regiment
    - 363rd Military Transport Aviation Regiment
    - 369th Military Transport Aviation Regiment
    - 566th Military Transport Aviation Regiment
    - 600th Military Transport Aviation Regiment
    - 708th Military Transport Aviation Regiment
  - Long Range Aviation
    - 409th Aircraft Refueling Aviation Regiment
    - 1230th Aircraft Refueling Aviation Regiment

Soviet Air Defence Forces

- 144th Airborne Early Warning Aviation Regiment

==== Ukraine ====
Never entered operational service with Ukrainian Long Range Aviation. After 1993, aircraft were disposed of, including foreign sales to Algeria, China and Pakistan, we well as private sales.

- Ukrainian Air Force - Ilyushin Il-78
  - 409th Aircraft Refueling Aviation Regiment

== See also ==
- Ilyushin Il-76
- Ilyushin Il-78
- Beriev A-50
