= List of airlines of Jordan =

This is a list of airlines currently operating in Jordan.

== Scheduled airlines ==
Airline	IATA	ICAO	Callsign	Image	Commenced operations	Notes
Royal Jordanian	RJ	RJA	JORDANIAN		1963	

== Charter airlines ==
Airline	IATA	ICAO	Callsign	Image	Commenced operations	Notes
Arab Wings		AWS	ARAB WINGS		1975	
FlyJordan	FO	FJR	Solitaire Air		2015	
Jordan Aviation	R5	JAV	JORDAN AVIATION		2000	
Raya Jet		RYT			2005	

== Cargo airlines ==
Airline	IATA	ICAO	Callsign	Image	Commenced operations	Notes
Jordan International Air Cargo	J4	JCI			2004	
Royal Jordanian Cargo	R5	JAV	JORDAN AVIATION		2000	

== See also ==
- List of airlines
- List of defunct airlines of Jordan
- List of defunct airlines of Asia
