= List of Royal Jordanian destinations =

Royal Jordanian serves the following destinations as of May 2026. Not included are charter services operated by its subsidiary Royal Wings.

== Destinations ==
Country / Region	City	Airport	Notes	Refs
Algeria	Algiers	Houari Boumediene Airport	Passenger	
Austria	Vienna	Vienna International Airport	Passenger	
Australia	Melbourne	Melbourne Airport	Terminated	
Australia	Sydney	Sydney Airport	Terminated	
Bahrain	Manama	Bahrain International Airport	Passenger	
Belgium	Brussels	Brussels Airport	Passenger	
Canada	Montreal	Montréal–Trudeau International Airport	Passenger	
Canada	Toronto	Toronto Pearson International Airport	Passenger	
China	Beijing	Beijing Capital International Airport	Terminated	
China	Guangzhou	Guangzhou Baiyun International Airport	Terminated	
Cyprus	Larnaca	Larnaca International Airport	Passenger + cargo	
Cyprus	Paphos	Paphos International Airport	Passenger	
Denmark	Copenhagen	Copenhagen Airport	Terminated	
Egypt	Alexandria	Borg El Arab International Airport	Passenger	
Egypt	Cairo	Cairo International Airport	Passenger + cargo	
Egypt	El Arish	El Arish International Airport	Terminated	
Egypt	Sharm El Sheikh	Sharm El Sheikh International Airport	Seasonal	
France	Lyon	Lyon–Saint-Exupéry Airport	Passenger	
France	Paris	Charles de Gaulle Airport	Passenger	
Germany	Berlin	Berlin Brandenburg Airport	Passenger	
Germany	Düsseldorf	Düsseldorf Airport	Passenger	
Germany	Frankfurt	Frankfurt Airport	Passenger	
Germany	Hamburg	Hamburg Airport	Passenger	
Germany	Munich	Munich Airport	Passenger	
Ghana	Accra	Accra International Airport	Terminated	
Greece	Athens	Athens International Airport	Passenger + cargo	
Hungary	Budapest	Budapest Ferenc Liszt International Airport	Terminated	
Hong Kong	Hong Kong	Hong Kong International Airport	Suspended	
India	Delhi	Indira Gandhi International Airport	Passenger	
India	Kolkata	Netaji Subhash Chandra Bose International Airport	Terminated	
India	Mumbai	Chhatrapati Shivaji Maharaj International Airport	Passenger	
Indonesia	Jakarta	Soekarno–Hatta International Airport	Terminated	
Iran	Tehran	Tehran Mehrabad International Airport	Terminated	
Iraq	Baghdad	Baghdad International Airport	Passenger + cargo	
Iraq	Basra	Basra International Airport	Passenger	
Iraq	Erbil	Erbil International Airport	Passenger	
Iraq	Mosul	Mosul International Airport	Terminated	
Iraq	Najaf	Al Najaf International Airport	Passenger	
Iraq	Sulaymaniyah	Sulaimaniyah International Airport	Passenger	
Ireland	Dublin	Dublin Airport	Terminated	
Ireland	Shannon	Shannon Airport	Terminated	
Israel	Haifa	Haifa Airport	Terminated	
Israel	Tel Aviv	Ben Gurion Airport	Suspended	
Italy	Milan	Milan Malpensa Airport	Passenger	
Italy	Rome	Rome Fiumicino Airport	Passenger	
Japan	Tokyo	Narita International Airport	Terminated	
Jordan	Amman	Queen Alia International Airport	Hub	
Jordan	Aqaba	King Hussein International Airport	Passenger	
Jordanian control (48'-67')	East Jerusalem	Atarot Airport	Terminated	
Kenya	Nairobi	Jomo Kenyatta International Airport	Terminated	
Kuwait	Kuwait City	Kuwait International Airport	Passenger + cargo	
Lebanon	Beirut	Beirut–Rafic Hariri International Airport	Passenger	
Libya	Benghazi	Benina International Airport	Passenger	
Libya	Misrata	Misrata Airport	Passenger	
Libya	Tripoli	Mitiga International Airport	Passenger	
Libya	Tripoli	Tripoli International Airport	Airport closed	
Malaysia	Kuala Lumpur	Kuala Lumpur International Airport	Terminated	
Morocco	Casablanca	Mohammed V International Airport	Passenger	
Morocco	Rabat	Rabat–Salé Airport	Terminated	
Netherlands	Amsterdam	Amsterdam Airport Schiphol	Passenger	
Netherlands	Maastricht	Maastricht Aachen Airport	Cargo	
Nigeria	Lagos	Murtala Muhammed International Airport	Terminated	
Pakistan	Karachi	Jinnah International Airport	Cargo	
Palestine	Gaza	Yasser Arafat International Airport	Terminated	
Philippines	Manila	Ninoy Aquino International Airport	Terminated	
Qatar	Doha	Hamad International Airport	Passenger	
Romania	Bucharest	Henri Coandă International Airport	Terminated	
Russia	Moscow	Moscow Domodedovo Airport	Passenger	
Saudi Arabia	Al Ula	Al-Ula International Airport	Seasonal	
Saudi Arabia	Dammam	King Fahd International Airport	Passenger	
Saudi Arabia	Jeddah	King Abdulaziz International Airport	Passenger	
Saudi Arabia	Medina	Prince Mohammad bin Abdulaziz International Airport	Passenger	
Saudi Arabia	Riyadh	King Khalid International Airport	Passenger + cargo	
Saudi Arabia	Tabuk	Tabuk Regional Airport	Terminated	
Serbia	Belgrade	Belgrade Nikola Tesla Airport	Resumes 27 October 2027	
Singapore	Singapore	Changi Airport	Terminated	
South Africa	Cape Town	Cape Town International Airport	Terminated	
South Africa	Johannesburg	O. R. Tambo International Airport	Terminated	
South Korea	Seoul	Incheon International Airport	Terminated	
Spain	Barcelona	Josep Tarradellas Barcelona–El Prat Airport	Passenger	
Spain	Madrid	Madrid–Barajas Airport	Passenger	
Sri Lanka	Colombo	Bandaranaike International Airport	Terminated	
Sudan	Khartoum	Khartoum International Airport	Terminated	
Sweden	Stockholm	Stockholm Arlanda Airport	Passenger	
Switzerland	Geneva	Geneva Airport	Passenger	
Switzerland	Zurich	Zurich Airport	Passenger	
Syria	Aleppo	Aleppo International Airport	Passenger	
Syria	Damascus	Damascus International Airport	Passenger	
Thailand	Bangkok	Suvarnabhumi Airport	Passenger	
Tunisia	Tunis	Tunis–Carthage International Airport	Passenger	
Turkey	Ankara	Esenboğa International Airport	Terminated	
Turkey	Antalya	Antalya Airport	Seasonal	
Turkey	Istanbul	Istanbul Airport	Passenger	
Turkey	Trabzon	Trabzon Airport	Seasonal	
Ukraine	Kyiv	Boryspil International Airport	Terminated	
United Arab Emirates	Abu Dhabi	Zayed International Airport	Passenger	
United Arab Emirates	Al Ain	Al Ain International Airport	Terminated	
United Arab Emirates	Dubai	Dubai International Airport	Passenger	
United Arab Emirates	Dubai	Al Maktoum International Airport	Cargo	
United Arab Emirates	Ras Al Khaimah	Ras Al Khaimah International Airport	Terminated	
United Arab Emirates	Sharjah	Sharjah International Airport	Passenger	
United Kingdom	London	Gatwick Airport ^{Cargo}	Terminated	
United Kingdom	London	Heathrow Airport	Passenger + cargo	
United Kingdom	London	London Stansted Airport	Passenger	
United Kingdom	Manchester	Manchester Airport	Passenger	
United States	Chicago	O'Hare International Airport	Passenger	
United States	Dallas	Dallas Fort Worth International Airport	Passenger	
United States	Detroit	Detroit Metropolitan Airport	Passenger	
United States	Houston	George Bush Intercontinental Airport	Terminated	
United States	Los Angeles	Los Angeles International Airport	Terminated	
United States	Miami	Miami International Airport	Terminated	
United States	New York City	John F. Kennedy International Airport	Passenger	
United States	Washington, D.C.	Dulles International Airport	Passenger	
Uzbekistan	Tashkent	Tashkent International Airport	Passenger	
Vietnam	Hanoi	Noi Bai International Airport	Terminated	
Yemen	Aden	Aden International Airport	Terminated	
Yemen	Sanaa	Sanaa International Airport	Terminated	

== See also ==
- Royal Wings
