= Arab Wings =

Jordanian airline

IATA	ICAO	Call sign
-	AWS	ARAB WINGS
- Founded: 1975; 51 years ago
- Operating bases: Amman Civil Airport
- Fleet size: 14
- Headquarters: Amman, Jordan
- Key people: Ahmad Abu Ghazaleh (CEO)
- Website: Official Website

Arab Wings is a charter airline based in Amman, Jordan. It operates charter passenger services throughout the Middle East, Persian Gulf and parts of Europe. Its main base is Amman Civil Airport, Amman.

== History ==
Arab Wings was established in 1975 as the first private jet charter operator in the Middle East. Based in Jordan, Arab wings services today include ad hoc charters, air ambulance services, aircraft management, a certified aircraft maintenance center and aircraft for special missions. Arab wings is also certified to do handling services out of all airports in Jordan. In 2010 Gulf wings, Arab wings sister company was granted its aircraft operating certificate (AOC) in the United Arab Emirates.

Arab Wings and Gulf Wings are owned by the International Wings Group (IWG). IWG also owns the Royal Jordanian Air Academy and Queen Noor Civil Aviation Technical College.

== Fleet ==
Arab Wings operates the following aircraft (as of June 5, 2016):

Arab Wings Fleet
Aircraft	Total	Orders	Passengers
Hawker 4000 (A6-SHH)	1	—	8
Beechcraft Super King Air	1	—	7
Hawker 800XP	2	—	8
Bombardier Challenger 604	1	—	10
Gulfstream IV	1	__	14
Bombardier Challenger 605	2	—	12
Bombardier Challenger 605 (A6-MVD)	1	—	10
Embraer Legacy 600	1	__	13
Embraer Legacy 650	1 (as of August 2017)	__	13
Embraer Lineage 1000	1 (as of August 2019)	__	19
Bombardier Global Express 5000	1	__	14
Boeing 737-700BBJ	1 (as of August 2019)	__	20
Total	14	__	
