= Aeroflot Flight 512 =

1973 aviation accident in Jordan

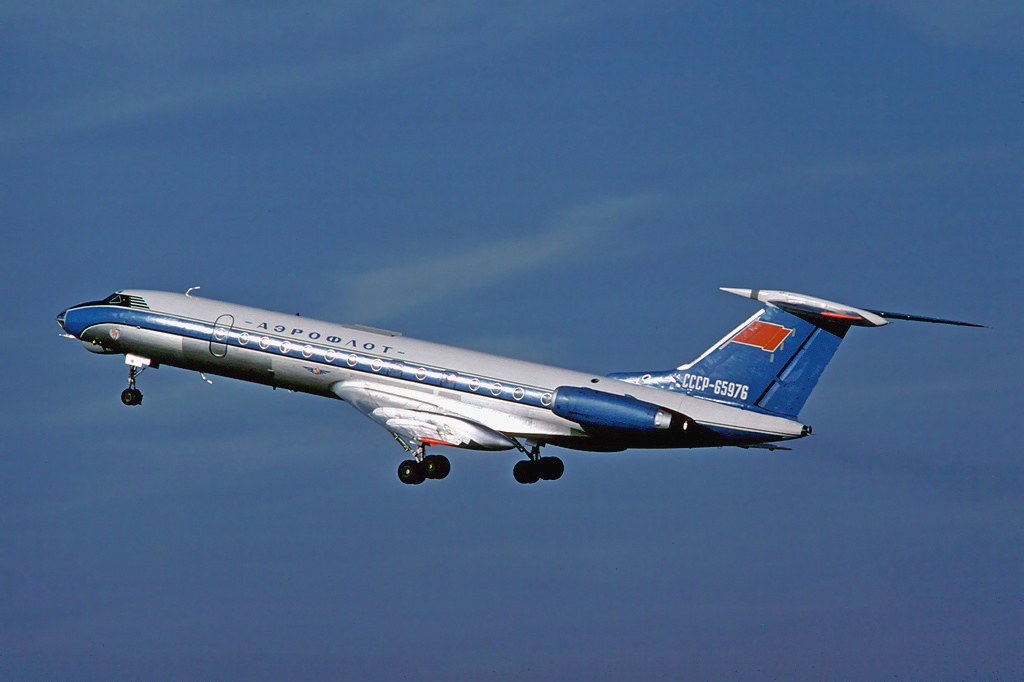
- A Tupolev Tu-134 of Aeroflot, similar to the one involved in the crash.

Accident
- Date: 30 June 1973
- Summary: Runway excursion due to pilot error
- Site: Amman-Marka International Airport, Amman, Jordan
- Total fatalities: 9
- Total survivors: 83

Aircraft
- Aircraft type: Tupolev Tu-134A
- Operator: Aeroflot (Armenian Unit)
- Registration: CCCP-65668
- Flight origin: Amman-Marka International Airport, Amman, Jordan
- 1st stopover: Beirut International Airport, Beirut, Lebanon
- 2nd stopover: Yerevan, Armenian SSR, Soviet Union
- Destination: Moscow, Russian SSR, Soviet Union
- Occupants: 85
- Passengers: 78
- Crew: 7
- Fatalities: 2
- Survivors: 83

Ground casualties
- Ground fatalities: 7

Aeroflot Flight 512 was an international scheduled passenger flight from Amman-Marka International Airport, Jordan, to Moscow with stopovers in Beirut, Lebanon, and Yerevan, Armenian SSR. On 30 June 1973, the aircraft aborted takeoff at Amman, overran the runway, slid down a ravine, struck trees, and finally hit a building. The navigator, the flight radio operator, and seven people in the house (three adults and four children) were killed.

== Aircraft ==
The aircraft involved was a Tupolev Tu-134A, manufactured in 1971 and registered as CCCP-65668. At the time of the accident, the aircraft had accumulated 2822 flight hours.

== Accident ==
At 13:37, the plane took off from runway 24. After reaching Vr (260km/h, 140knots), the pilot began to raise the nose landing gear at 265km/h (143 knots). Immediately afterwards, the pilot noted a tendency for the indicated airspeed to drop, which he expressed by exclaiming, "What is this?". Engine failure was thought to be a reason, he loudly announced, "Engine failure!" and decided to abort the takeoff. Only 500-550 meters remained to the end of the runway, the aircraft rolled off and crashed nose-first into a one-story reinforced concrete residential building, stopped, and was destroyed.

== Aftermath ==
The aircraft fuselage broke into three parts along frames 22-24 and 42-43, with these parts rotating relative to each other. The navigator's cabin was destroyed over two-thirds of its length. The landing gear legs were damaged, and the right one was completely torn off. The right side of the fuselage was fractured with an upward bend. The forward section of the aircraft was completely inside the destroyed building. The fire brigade quickly extinguished a small fire in the basement toilets.

The navigator, the flight radio operator, and seven people in the house (three adults and four children) were killed. The passengers, including 66 adults and 12 children, received minor injuries or were uninjured.

	Crew	Passenger	Total
Survived	5	78	83
Perished	2	0	2
Total	7	0	85

== Investigation ==
It is reported that the captain had the impression that the speed dropped due to an engine failure. However, investigations did not show any technical anomalies with the engines, and the decision to abort takeoff was unfounded. The accident occurred during a partial solar eclipse, which could have influenced or affected the pilot's perceptions.

The plane crash occurred when the inspector aborted the takeoff at a speed close to liftoff speed, due to an erroneous, subjective perception of a decrease in the airspeed indicator during takeoff.

At the time of the accident, a partial solar eclipse was observed in Amman. The commission authorized a study to examine the impact of a solar eclipse on a person's psychological state during critical decision-making.

In response to the commission's inquiry, the Institute of Biomedical Problems concluded that a solar eclipse can disrupt a pilot's daily activities, as changes in light intensity have a negative effect:

1. As an external inhibitor (increasing overall body tension, disrupting daily activities)
2. As a cause, it alters the overall body tone, particularly the muscular system. Changes in light factors are accompanied by changes in muscle tone, which shifts activity to a new level. Learned actions in such a case may prove less adequate to the demands of the situation.

== See also ==
- British European Airways Flight 609, runway excursion after the drop of speed.
- Cubana de Aviacion Flight 389, overran the runway after aborting the takeoff
