= Petra Airlines =

Jordanian airline

IATA	ICAO	Call sign
9P	PTR	PETRA AIRLINES
- Founded: 2005
- Commenced operations: 2010
- Ceased operations: 2014
- Operating bases: Queen Alia International Airport
- Secondary hubs: Marka International Airport
- Focus cities: King Hussein International Airport
- Fleet size: 2
- Destinations: 11
- Headquarters: Amman, Jordan
- Key people: Riad Khashman, Chairman and CEO
- Website: http://www.flypetra.com/

Petra Airlines was an airline based in Amman, Jordan. The company was founded in 2005 as a subsidiary of RUM Group (which also owned now defunct Air Rum), but acquired its first airplane only in October 2010. The name of the company was derived from the rock cut city of Petra, one of the most famous tourist sights in Jordan.

In early 2011, Petra Airlines began providing charter services to tour operators. In 2012, it upgraded its license to become a scheduled airline.

In January 2015, Air Arabia announced the acquisition of a 49% stake in Petra Airlines. The RUM Group retained a 51% stake in the airline, which was then rebranded as Air Arabia Jordan in early 2015. As such, it initially operates 2 Airbus A320 aircraft and there are plans to develop a new hub in Amman.

== Destinations ==
Turkey

- Antalya – Antalya Airport
- Bodrum – Milas–Bodrum Airport
- Dalaman – Dalaman Airport

Saudi Arabia

- Jeddah – King Abdulaziz International Airport
- Medina – Prince Mohammad Bin Abdulaziz Airport

Egypt

- Sharm El Sheikh – Sharm El Sheikh International Airport
- Hurghada – Hurghada International Airport

== Fleet ==
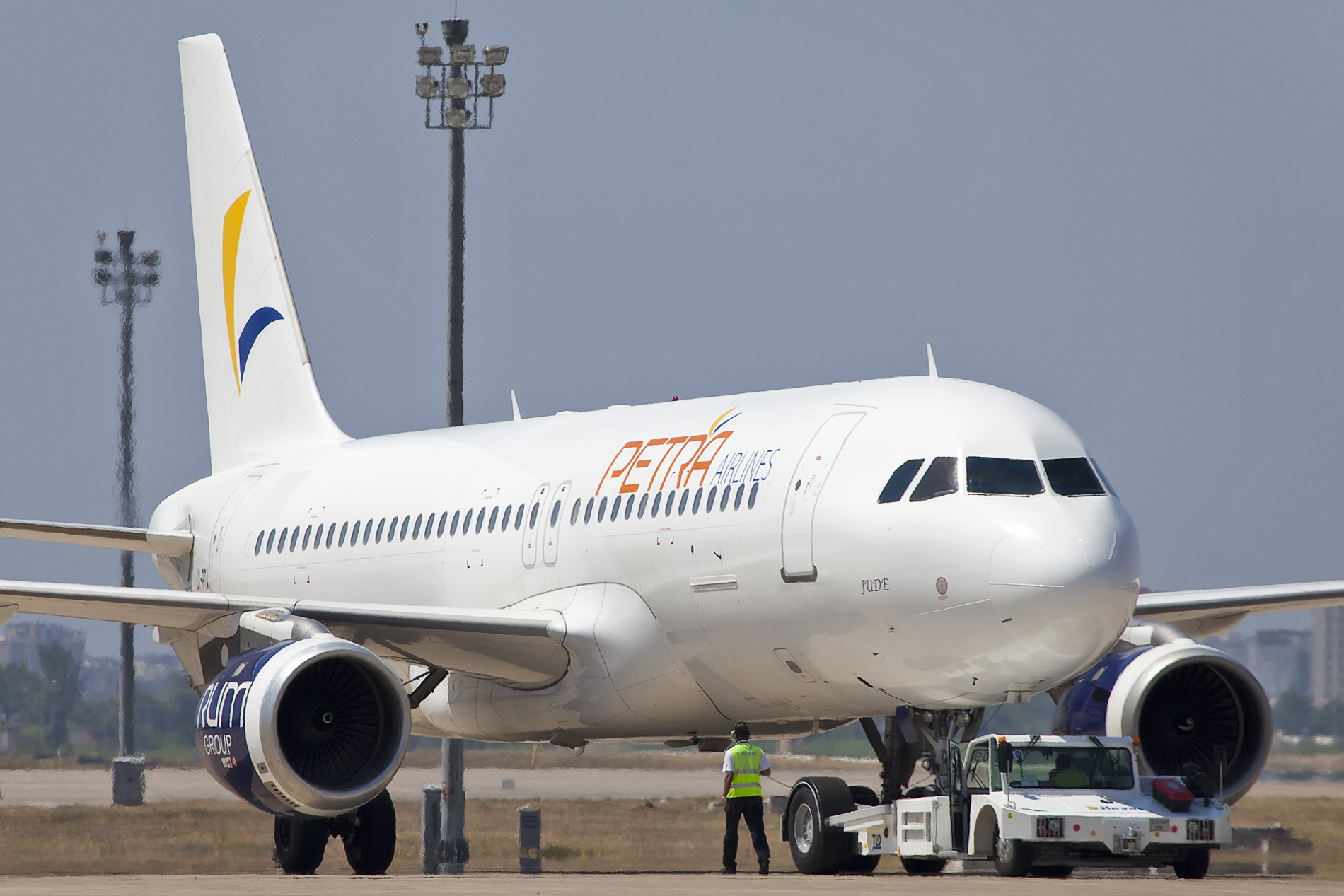
Airbus A320 of Petra Airlines at Antalya Airport (July 2011)

The Petra Airlines fleet consists of the following aircraft: (as of January 2015).

Petra Airlines
Aircraft	Active	Inactive	Orders	Passengers
Airbus A320-100/200	1	1	1	165
