= Air Rum =

IATA	ICAO	Call sign
-	RUM	AIR RUM
- Founded: 2002
- Ceased operations: 2008
- Hubs: Queen Alia International Airport
- Headquarters: Amman, Jordan
- Website: http://www.airrum.com/

Air Rum was an airline registered in Sierra Leone, though based in Amman owned by Jordanian business man Mohammad Ibrahim Abu Sheikh, Jordan. It operated leasing and charter flights out of Queen Alia International Airport, Amman.

== History ==
The airline was established in 2002 as a subsidiary of RUM Group by Mohammad Abu Sheikh, who served as President and General Manager. Services were somewhat limited as Air Rum was on the List of air carriers banned in the European Union due to safety concerns. Air Rum became inoperational in 2008 and was subsequently dismantled, in favor of Petra Airlines, another subsidiary of RUM Group.

== Incidents and accidents ==
On 20 September 2005, an Air Rum aircraft full of Gambian football fans heading for Lima, Peru faked a fuel starvation emergency so that the flight had to divert to Piura. The fans were going to support their national team playing in the city for the 2005 FIFA U-17 World Championship.
