= Royal Falcon =

Jordanian charter airline

IATA	ICAO	Call sign
-	RFJ	-
- Founded: 2007
- Ceased operations: August 2016
- Hubs: Queen Alia International Airport
- Fleet size: 5
- Destinations: 8
- Headquarters: Amman - Mecca Street
- Key people: nabil ababneh (President/CEO)
- Website: http://www.royalfalcon.com.jo/

Royal Falcon Airlines (Arabic: الصقر الملكي للطيران) was a charter airline based in Amman, Jordan.

== History ==
Royal Falcon Airlines was set up in 2007. The operation was launched on a non-scheduled basis. In 2009, the airline became the second scheduled air carrier. The airline is a sister company to Jordan International Air Cargo (JIAC) which was established in 2005.

The company had its license suspended by the Civil Aviation Regulatory Commission in August 2016.

== Destinations ==
Royal Falcon operated the following services (As of December 2013):

Iraq

- Erbil - Erbil International Airport
- Najaf - Al Najaf International Airport
- Mosul - Mosul International Airport

Jordan

- Amman - Queen Alia International Airport

Saudi Arabia

- Jeddah - King Abdulaziz International Airport

Egypt

- Cairo - Cairo International Airport

United Arab Emirates

- Abu Dhabi - Abu Dhabi International Airport

== Fleet ==
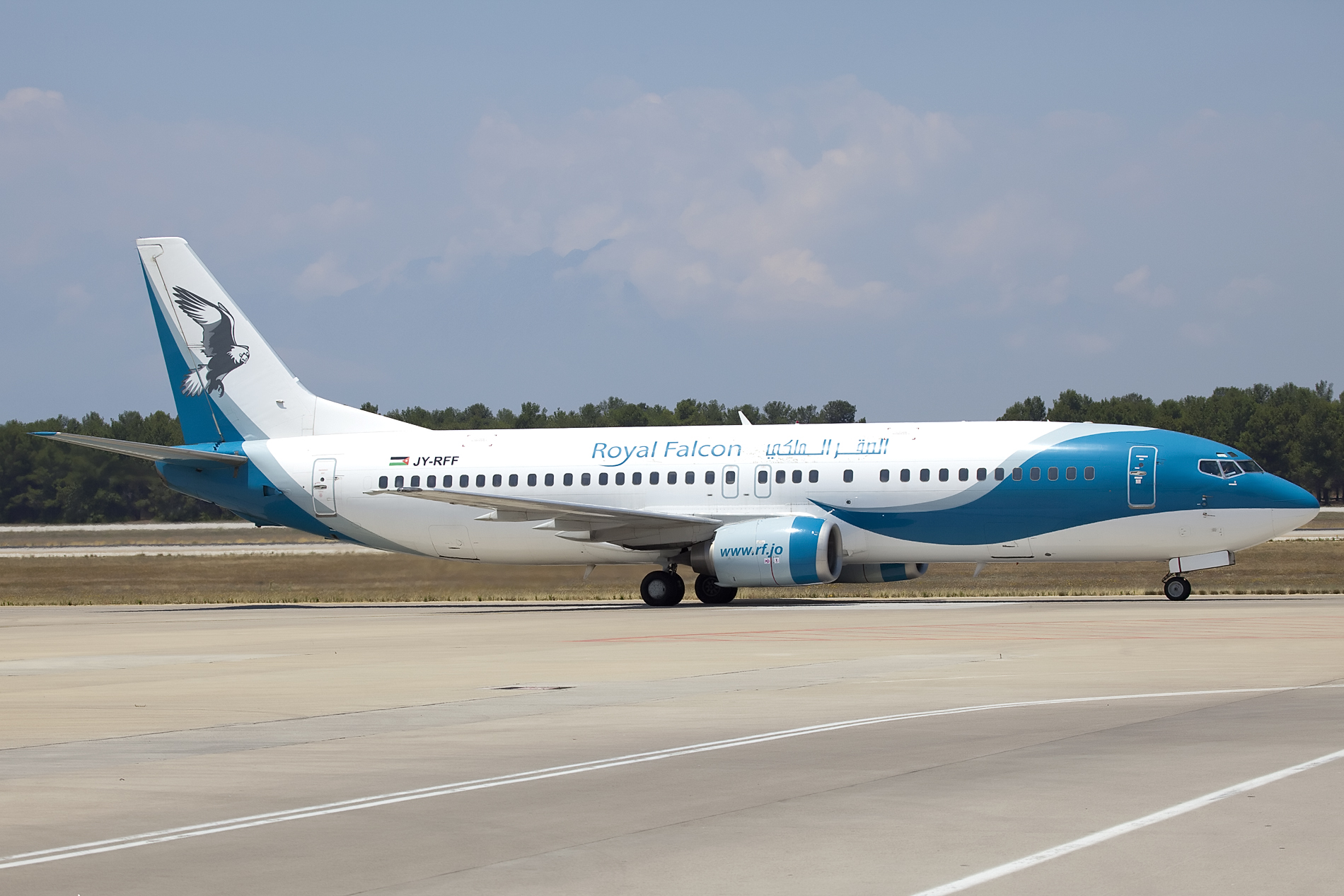
Royal Falcon Boeing 737-400

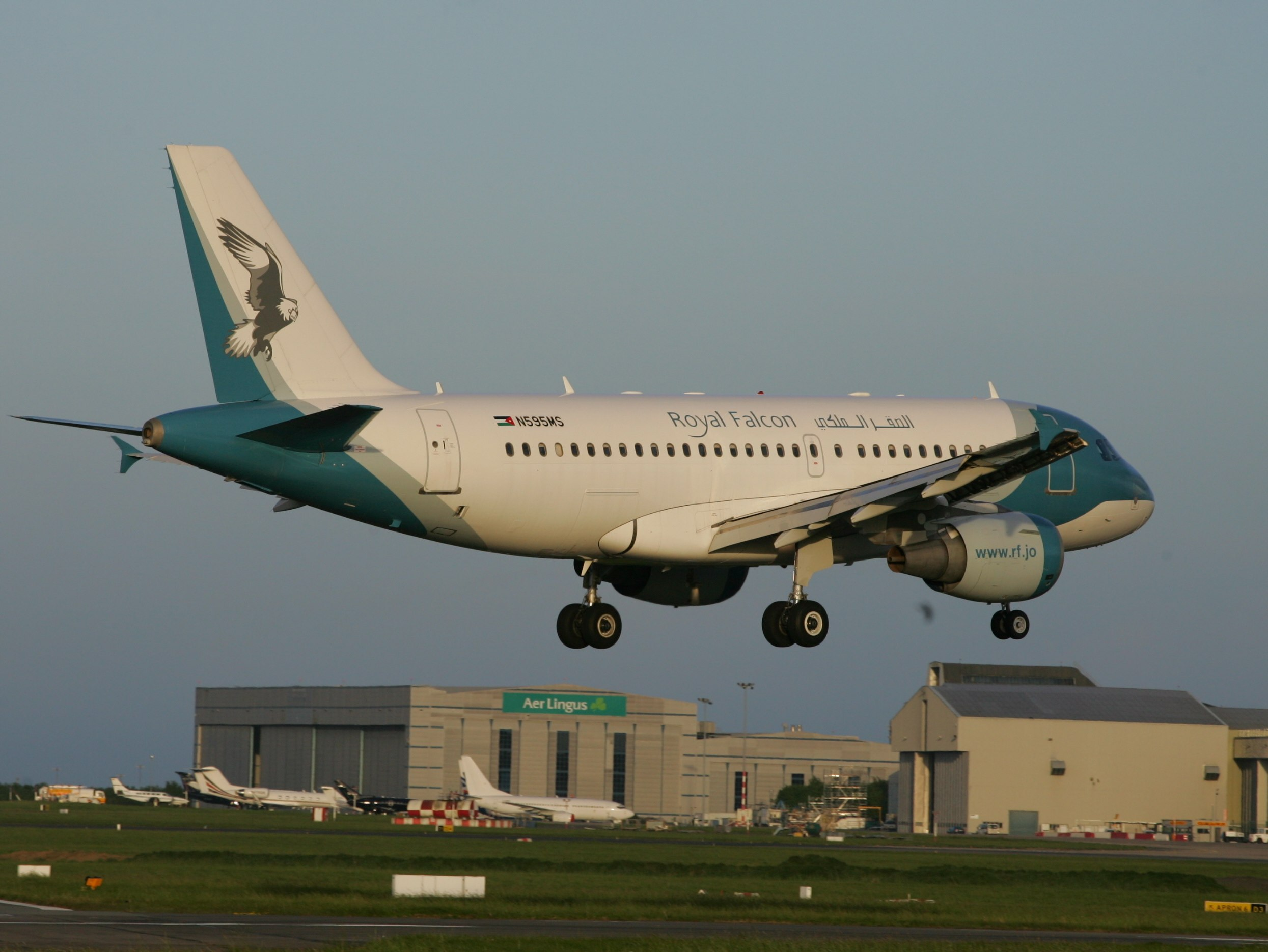
Royal Falcon Airbus A319

The Royal Falcon fleet included the following aircraft (as of August 2016):

Royal Falcon
Aircraft	In fleet	Order	Passengers
Airbus A320-214	1	0	180
Boeing 737-400	1	0	158
