= Rubystar Airways =

Belarusian cargo airline

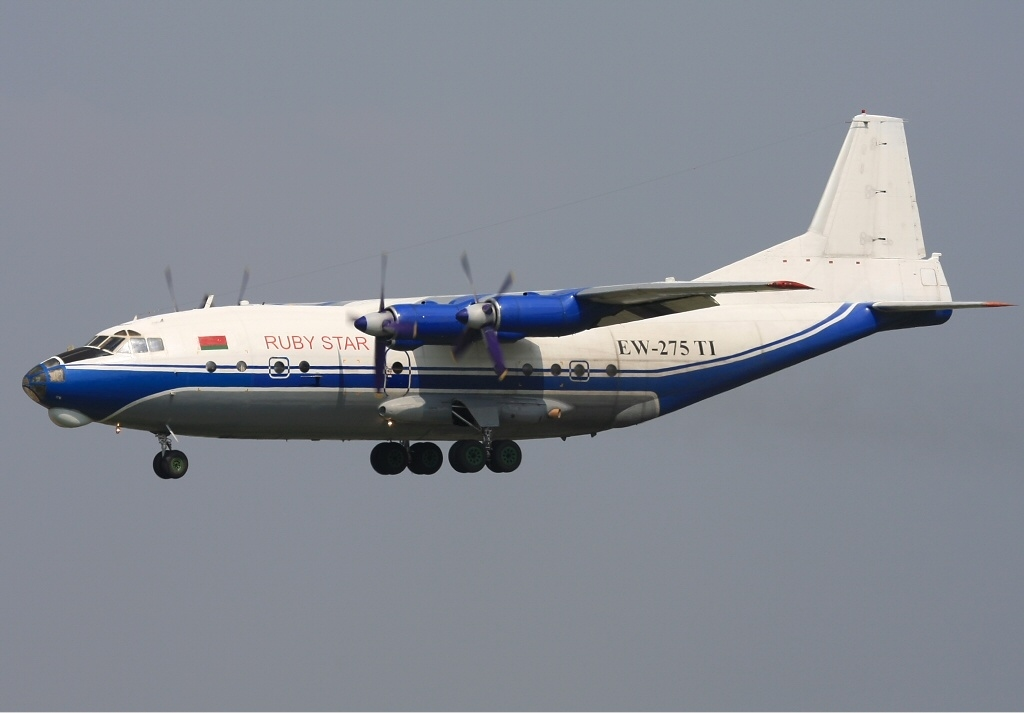
- Antonov An-12
IATA	ICAO	Call sign
—	RSB	RUBYSTAR
- Founded: 2002; 24 years ago
- Operating bases: Minsk National Airport
- Fleet size: 3
- Headquarters: Minsk, Belarus
- Key people: Mikholai Evgeniy
- Website: rubystar.by

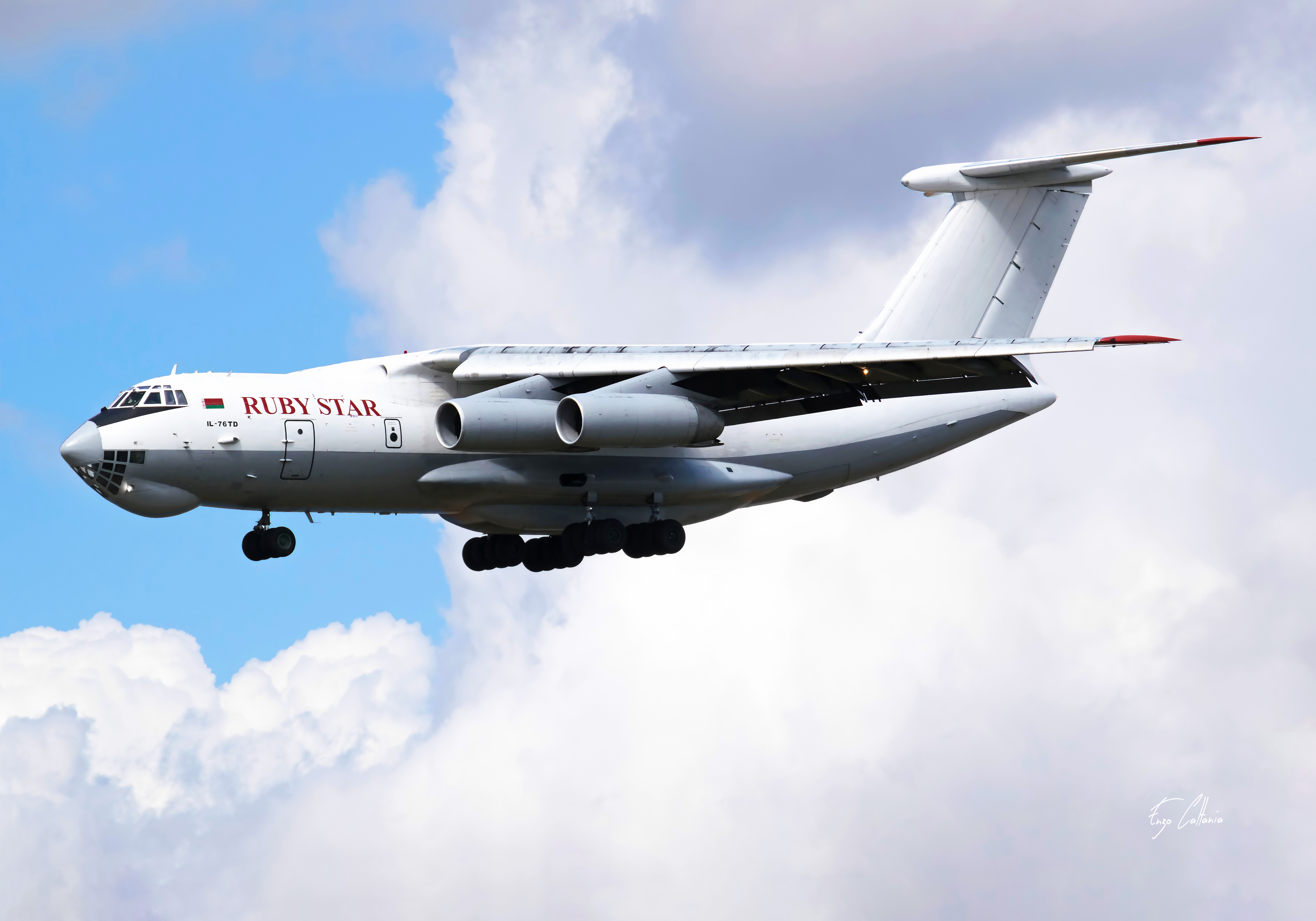
Ilyushin Il-76TD

Rubystar Airways (Belarusian: РубіСтар) is a Belarusian cargo airline headquartered in Minsk and based at Minsk National Airport.

== History ==
Rubystar was created in 2000 as an air freight sales agency. The airline has been fully licensed as an air carrier since 2002 by the State Aviation Committee of Belarus.

On August 9, 2024, the company and its director were added to the US Specially Designated Nationals and Blocked Persons List.

== Fleet ==
=== Current fleet ===
As of August 2025, Rubystar Airways operates the following aircraft:

- 1 Antonov An-12BP
- 2 Ilyushin Il-76TD

=== Former fleet ===
- 4 Antonov An-12
- 1 Boeing 747-400(BDSF)
