= Kaz Air Trans =

Kazakhstani airline

IATA	ICAO	Call sign
—	KUY	KAIGA
- Founded: 2008
- Commenced operations: 2008
- Operating bases: Almaty International Airport
- Fleet size: 1
- Headquarters: Astana, Kazakhstan
- Key people: Mirlan Biyaliev

Kaz Air Trans is a charter airline founded in 2008 and based in Almaty, Kazakhstan.

== Fleet ==
=== Current fleet ===
As of August 2025, Kaz Air Trans Air operates the following aircraft:

Current fleet
Fleet	In service
Ilyushin Il-76	1

=== Former fleet ===
Kazairtrans previously operated the following aircraft:

- 3 Tupolev Tu-154
- 2 Boeing 737-200
- 1 Yakovlev Yak-42
