= Queen Noor Civil Aviation Technical College =

Technical school in Jordan

Queen Noor Civil Aviation Technical College (QNAC or QNCATC; Arabic: كلية الملكة نور الفنية للطيران المدني) is a private engineering college located in Amman, Jordan. The college was established in 1973 with the support of the ICAOabd UNDP, started CAA personnel training in 1964 as a classroom for Jordanian Air traffic controllers. In 1990, the college became one of the first members of the ICAO TRAINAIR Program.In 2011 ICAO TrainAir renamed as TrainAir Plus. The QNCATC nowadays have recently a state of the art ATC simulator 4. https://www.ufainc.com/
