= Royal Wings =

Jordanian airline (1996–2018)

Royal Wings Airline
IATA	ICAO	Call sign
RY	RYW	ROYAL WINGS
- Founded: 1 January 1996
- Ceased operations: 30 November 2018
- Fleet size: 1
- Destinations: 2 (April 2017)
- Parent company: Royal Jordanian
- Headquarters: Amman, Jordan
- Key people: Osama Quntar (Managing Director)
- Website: http://www.royalwings.com.jo/

Royal Wings (RW, Arabic: الأجنحة الملكية) was an airline based in Amman, Jordan. It was a Royal Jordanian Group Company and the charter arm of Royal Jordanian. Its main base was at Queen Alia International Airport (AMM), Amman with hubs also at Amman Civil Airport (ADJ), and King Hussein International Airport (AQJ).

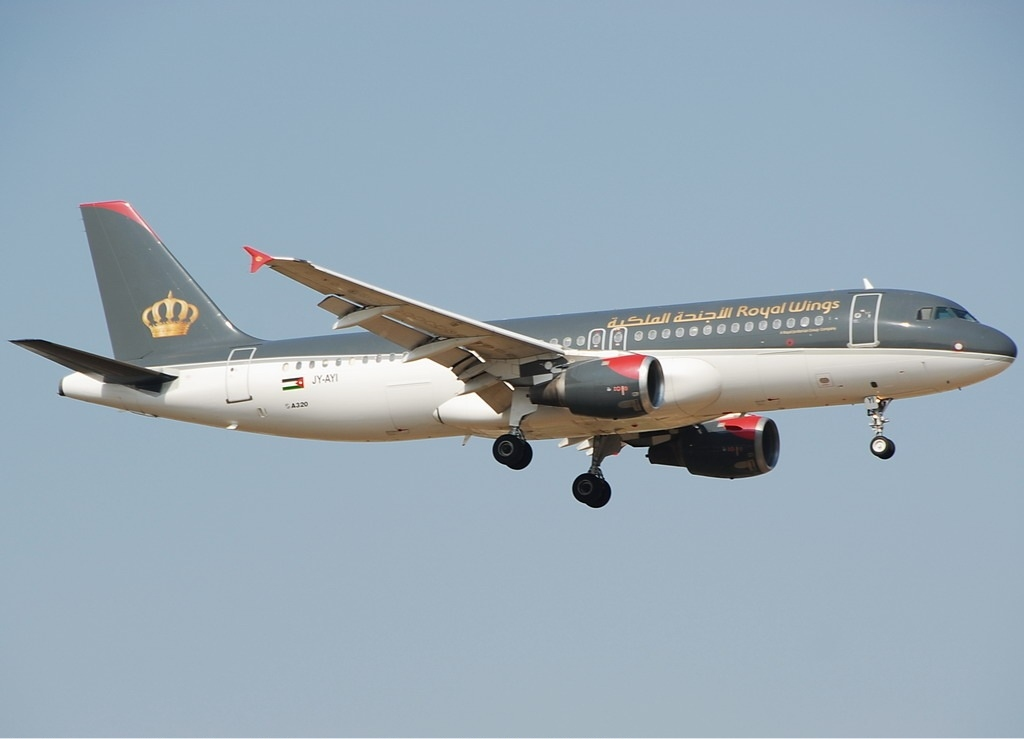
A Royal Wings Airbus A320

== History ==
Royal Wings was initiated to develop a domestic and regional carrier for Jordan which could serve domestic travel, national and regional tours. During the introduction of Royal Wings, the fleet consisted of two Bombardier DHC-8s which operated scheduled flights from Amman Civil Airport in Jordan from Amman to Aqaba, Tel Aviv, Gaza, Arish, Ankara, Aleppo, Sharm el-Sheikh and Alexandria. In addition to charter services to several destinations, namely Larnaca, Rhodes, Antalya, Dalaman, Bodrum, Hurghada, Sharm el-Sheikh, Alexandria, Luxor, and Aswan, mainly during the summer holiday season (June to October) and on occasions of festivals like Eid, Easter, Christmas and New Year.

In addition to air transport, Royal Wings provides handling and maintenance services to other aircraft. In 1979, the Fixed-base operator (FBO) was established at Amman Civil Airport by providing VIP handling to all general aviation aircraft as well as for commercial flights.

On November 13, 2018, the parent company of the airline Royal Jordanian, announced that all Royal Wings operations would end on November 30, 2018, due to subsequent losses and high operating costs. It was also announced that the sole Royal Wings operated aircraft would be transferred back to Royal Jordanian. In addition, 12 seconded employees returned to Royal Jordanian and 18 new employees who previously were employed by Royal Wings also made the transfer to the parent company at the end of the month.

== Destinations ==
Royal Wings operated scheduled flights to the following destinations as of April 2017:

Country	City	Airport	Notes
Egypt	Cairo	Cairo International Airport	
Georgia	Batumi	Alexander Kartveli Batumi International Airport	Charter
Jordan	Amman	Queen Alia International Airport	
Jordan	Aqaba	King Hussein International Airport	Base
Lebanon	Beirut	Beirut–Rafic Hariri International Airport	Seasonal
United Arab Emirates	Dubai	Al Maktoum International Airport	
