= Air Arabia Jordan =

IATA	ICAO	Call sign
9P	JAD	AIR ARABIA JORDAN
- Founded: 24 December 2014
- Commenced operations: 24 May 2015
- Ceased operations: April 2018
- Operating bases: Queen Alia International Airport
- Fleet size: 2
- Destinations: 8
- Parent company: Air Arabia (49%); Rum Aviation (51%)
- Headquarters: Prince Shaker Bin Zaid Street, Shmesani Amman, Jordan
- Key people: Riad Khashman, CEO
- Website: www.airarabia.com

Air Arabia Jordan was a low-cost carrier based in Jordan. The airline was a joint venture between the RUM Group in Jordan and Air Arabia and was the first low-cost airline based in Jordan.

== History ==
In January 2015 Air Arabia announced the acquisition of a 49% stake in Jordanian operator Petra Airlines. The principal shareholder of Petra Airlines, the RUM Group, retain a 51% stake in the airline, which was rebranded as Air Arabia Jordan in early 2015. It operates 2 Airbus A320 aircraft and there are plans to develop a new hub in Amman.

Air Arabia Jordan ended scheduled service in November 2017 and moved to charter operations. and the airline ceased operations completely in April 2018.

== Destinations ==
Egypt

- Sharm el-Sheikh - Sharm el-Sheikh International Airport

Georgia

- Tbilisi - Tbilisi International Airport

Jordan

- Amman - Queen Alia International Airport Hub

Kuwait

- Kuwait International Airport

Saudi Arabia

- Dammam - King Fahd International Airport
- Jeddah - King Abdulaziz International Airport
- Riyadh - King Khalid International Airport

Turkey

- Istanbul - Sabiha Gökçen International Airport

== Fleet ==
The Air Arabia Jordan fleet consisted of the following aircraft (as of August 2017):

Air Arabia Jordan Fleet
Aircraft	In Service	Orders	Passengers	Notes
Airbus A320-200	2	—	168	
Total	2	—		
