= Amman City Airport =

Amman City Airport مطار مدينة عمّان
- IATA: ADJ; ICAO: OJAM

Summary
- Airport type: Public / Military
- Owner: Government
- Operator: Jordan Airports Company
- Serves: Amman
- Location: Amman, Jordan
- Hub for: Arab Wings; Jordan International Air Cargo
- Elevation AMSL: 2,555 ft (779 m)
- Coordinates: 31°58′21″N 35°59′29″E
- Website: jac.jo

Map
- Location of airport in Jordan

Runways
Direction	Length		Surface
Direction	m	ft	Surface
06/24	3,275	10,745	Asphalt

Statistics (2012)
- Passengers: 279,219
- Movements: 7,090
- Sources: AIP and DAFIF

Amman City Airport (IATA: ADJ, ICAO: OJAM) (Arabic: مطار مدينة عمّان, romanized: Maṭār Madina ʿAmmān), is located in Marka district, Jordan, some 5 kilometres (3.1 mi; 2.7 NM) northeast of the capital Amman's city centre.

During World War I, an airstrip was established near Amman in 1915 for use by German airplanes, then an ally of the ruling Ottoman Empire. Following Ottoman defeat and the establishment of the Emirate of Transjordan in 1921, the British used the airstrip as a base for their squadrons. In 1950, the airstrip was developed as a joint military-civilian airport, which became Jordan's main airport until the opening of Queen Alia International Airport in 1983.

In 2013, following the inauguration of QAIA's new terminals, ACA was closed to civilian flights, as per the government's exclusivity agreement with QAIA's developers. In 2025, ACA reopened after the exclusivity clause's expiration, now aiming to serve as a complimentary secondary airport to QAIA for medium-sized aircraft including low-cost carriers.

ACA is also an aviation education and training hub and hosts air freight operations. It serves as the home base for Arab Wings and Jordan International Air Cargo, and the Jordan Airports Company is headquartered at the airport.

== History ==
An airstrip in Marka was first established by Germany during World War I in 1915, then an ally of the Ottoman Empire. The airstrip was built on a hill adjacent to the Hejaz Railway's Amman Station. The airstrip was later using by the British Royal Airforce (RAF) starting in March 1921, after the establishment of the Emirate of Transjordan.

The airport was founded in 1950 by the British as a joint military-civilian airport. It served as Jordan's main civilian airport until Queen Alia International Airport (QAIA) opened in 1983.

In 2013, following the inauguration of QAIA's new terminals, ACA was closed to civilian flights, as per the government's exclusivity agreement with QAIA's developers. In 2025, ACA reopened after the exclusivity clause's expiration.

== Airlines and destinations ==
Airlines	Destinations
Air Arabia	Abu Dhabi, Alexandria, Sharjah
Air Cairo	Assiut, Alexandria
flynas	Jeddah, Medina
Jazeera Airways	Kuwait City
Royal Jordanian	Seasonal: Antalya, Istanbul, Sharm El Sheikh

== Accidents and incidents ==
- On 30 June 1973, Aeroflot Flight 512, a Tupolev Tu-134A, registration CCCP-65668, overran the runway on takeoff from the airport, traveled down the slope of a ravine, struck trees and a one-story concrete building 290 metres (317 yd) beyond the runway threshold, and broke into three parts, killing two crew members and seven people in the building. The other five crew members and all 78 passengers survived. Investigators determined that the crash occurred because the captain mistakenly believed that one engine had failed and the airliner's speed was dropping — in fact, both engines were working properly — and decided to abort the takeoff at a speed of 265 kilometres per hour (165 mph; 143 kn).
