= Jordan International Air Cargo =

Jordanian cargo airline

| IATA | ICAO | Call sign |
|---|---|---|
| J4 | JCI | - |
- Founded: 2004; 22 years ago
- Hubs: Amman Civil Airport
- Fleet size: 3
- Parent company: Royal Jordanian Air Force
- Headquarters: Amman, Jordan
- Website: jiac.com.jo

Jordan International Air Cargo is a cargo airline based in Amman, Jordan.

== History ==
It was founded in 2004 and is owned and operated by the Royal Jordanian Air Force.

== Fleet ==
The Jordan International Air Cargo fleet included the following aircraft on 14 June 2011:

- 2 Ilyushin Il-76MF
- 1 Ilyusin Il-76MD

== Controversy ==
In March 2013, The New York Times reported that Jordan International Air Cargo was a front organization for the Royal Jordanian Air Force and responsible for covertly flying arms to Turkey to aid Syrian rebels in the Syrian civil war.
