= List of airline codes (K) =

This is a list of all airline codes. The table lists the IATA airline designators, the ICAO airline designators and the airline call signs (telephony designator). Historical assignments are also included for completeness.

== Codes ==
Airline codes
IATA	ICAO	Airline	Call sign	Country	Comments
	KTA	K2 Airways		Pakistan	
	KSA	K S Avia	SKY CAMEL	Latvia	
	KCR	Kolob Canyons Air Services	KOLOB	United States	
KW	KHK	Kharkiv Airlines	SUNRAY	Ukraine	
	KGZ	Kyrgyz Airlines	BERMET	Kyrgyzstan	
	KDC	K D Air Corporation	KAY DEE	Canada	
	KMI	K-Mile Air	KAY-MILE AIR	Thailand	
KD	KLS	Kalstar Aviation	KALSTAR	Indonesia	
KD	KNI	KD Avia	KALININGRAD AIR	Russia	
WA	KLC	KLM Cityhopper	CITY	Netherlands	
	KLH	KLM Helicopter	KLM HELI	Netherlands	
KL	KLM	KLM	KLM	Netherlands	
N2	QNK	Kabo Air	KABO	Nigeria	
	KMC	Kahama Mining Corporation	KAHAMA	Tanzania	
KI	KAI	KaiserAir	KAISER	United States	Operates B737-500, B737-700, B737-800
K4	CKS	Kalitta Air	CONNIE	United States	Operates B747-400's, B767-300ER's, B777F.
K9*	KFS	Kalitta Charters	KALITTA	United States	Operates Lear 25s, 35s, 36s Falcon 20s, CL601
K5*	KII	Kalitta Charters II	DRAGSTER	United States	Operates B727-200's, DC9-15 & 30, B737-400's. Owner Doug Kalitta is an NHRA Top Fuel champion.
	KES	Kallat El Saker Air Company	KALLAT EL SKER	Libya	
RQ	KMF	Kam Air	KAMGAR	Afghanistan	
E2	KMP	Kampuchea Airlines	KAMPUCHEA	Cambodia	IATA was KT
	KIZ	Kanaf-Arkia Airlines		Israel	
	KHE	Kanfey Ha'emek Aviation	KANFEY HAEMEK	Israel	
	KSU	Kansas State University	K-STATE	United States	
V2	AKT	Karat	AVIAKARAT	Russia	
	KRB	Karibu Airways Company	KARIBU AIR	Tanzania	
	KLG	Karlog Air Charter	KARLOG	Denmark	defunct
	KAJ	Karthago Airlines	KARTHAGO	Tunisia	
	KAE	Kartika Airlines	KARTIKA	Indonesia	
	KTV	Kata Transportation	KATAVIA	Sudan	
	KTK	Katekavia	KATEKAVIA	Russia	
	KAT	Kato Airline	KATO-AIR	Norway	
KV	MVD	Kavminvodyavia	AIR MINVODY	Russia	
	XKA	Kavouras Inc		United States	
	KRN	Kaz Agros Avia	ANTOL	Kazakhstan	
	KAW	Kaz Air West	KAZWEST	Kazakhstan	
	KAO	Kazan Aviation Production Association	KAZAVAIA	Russia	
	KPH	Kazan Helicopters	KAMA	Russia	
	KKA	Kazavia	KAKAIR	Kazakhstan	
	KZS	Kazaviaspas	SPAKAZ	Kazakhstan	
3Q	KCH	KC International Airlines	CAM AIR	Cambodia	
	JFK	Keenair Charter -	KEENAIR	United Kingdom	
	KLX	Kelix Air	KELIX	Nigeria	
	FKL	Kelner Airways	KELNER	Canada	
KW	KFA	Kelowna Flightcraft Air Charter	FLIGHTCRAFT	Canada	
	KDA	Kendell Airlines	KENDELL	Australia	defunct
M5	KEN	Kenmore Air	KENMORE	United States	
	KBA	Kenn Borek Air	BOREK AIR	Canada	
	KAH	Kent Aviation	DEKAIR	Canada	
KQ	KQA	Kenya Airways	KENYA	Kenya	
	KVS	Kevis	KEVIS	Kazakhstan	
ZN	KEY	Key Airlines	KEY AIR	United States	
KG	LYM	Key Lime Air	KEY LIME	United States	
	FTP	Keystone Aerial Surveys	FOOTPRINT	United States	
BZ	KEE	Keystone Air Service	KEYSTONE	Canada	
K6	KZW	Khalifa Airways	KHALIFA AIR	Algeria	
	WKH	Kharkov Aircraft Manufacturing Company	WEST-KHARKOV	Ukraine	
	KHR	Khazar	KHAZAR	Turkmenistan	
	KHP	Khoezestan Photros Air Lines	PHOTROS AIR	Iran	
	KRV	Khoriv-Avia	KHORIV-AVIA	Ukraine	
X9 KO	KHO	Khors Aircompany	AIRCOMPANY KHORS	Ukraine	defunct
	KHY	Khyber Afghan Airlines	KHYBER	Afghanistan	
	UAK	Kiev Aviation Plant	AVIATION PLANT	Ukraine	
	KNG	King Aviation	KING	United Kingdom	
	BEZ	Kingfisher Air Services	SEA BREEZE	United States	
IT	KFR	Kingfisher Airlines	KINGFISHER	India	Defunct Since 2012 IATA Code transferred to Tigerair Taiwan
4I	KNX	Knighthawk Air Express	KNIGHT FLIGHT	Canada	
	KAS	Kingston Air Services	KINGSTON AIR	Canada	
	KIP	Kinnarps	KINNARPS	Sweden	
	KNS	Kinshasa Airways	KINSHASA AIRWAYS	Democratic Republic of the Congo	defunct
	KTA	Kirov Air Enterprise	VYATKA-AVIA	Russia	
Y9	IRK	Kish Air	KISHAIR	Iran	
KR	KHA	Kitty Hawk Aircargo	AIR KITTYHAWK	United States	defunct
2K	KHC	Kitty Hawk Airways	CARGO HAWK	United States	defunct
KP	KIA	Kiwi International Air Lines	KIWI AIR	United States	
	KRA	Kiwi Regional Airlines	REGIONAL	New Zealand	
KY	KNA	Kunming Airlines	KUNMING AIR	China	ICAO code KNA was used by Knight Air
	KHX	Knighthawk Express	RIZZ	United States	
	KGT	Knights Airlines	KNIGHT-LINER	Nigeria	
	KOA	Koanda Avacion	KOANDA	Spain	
	OYE	Koda International	KODA AIR	Nigeria	
7K	KGL	Kogalymavia Air Company	KOGALYM	Russia	
	KOM	Kom Activity	COMJET	Netherlands	
	KMA	Komiaviatrans State Air Enterprise	KOMI AVIA	Russia	
8J	KMV	Komiinteravia	KOMIINTER	Russia	
	KNM	Komsomolsk-on-Amur Air Enterprise	KNAAPO	Russia	
	KOB	Koob-Corp - 96 KFT	AUTOFLEX	Hungary	
KE	KAL	Korean Air	KOREANAIR	South Korea	
	KMG	Kosmas Air	KOSMAS CARGO	Serbia	
	KSM	Kosmos	KOSMOS	Russia	
	KOS	Kosova Airlines	KOSOVA	Serbia	
	WOK	Kovar Air	WOKAIR	Czech Republic	
7B	KJC	Krasnojarsky Airlines	KRASNOJARSKY AIR	Russia	defunct
	KFC	Kremenchuk Flight College	KREMENCHUK	Ukraine	
	KRG	Krimaviamontag	AVIAMONTAG	Ukraine	
	KRO	Kroonk Air Agency	KROONK	Ukraine	
K9	KRI	Krylo Airlines	Krylo	Russia	
	KYM	Krym	CRIMEA AIR	Ukraine	
	OPC	Krystel Air Charter	OPTIC	United Kingdom	
GW	KIL	Kuban Airlines	AIR KUBAN	Russia	
VD	KPA	Kunpeng Airlines	KUNPENG	China	
	KZA	Kurzemes Avio		Russia	
	KBV	Kustbevakningen	SWECOAST	Sweden	
KU	KAC	Kuwait Airways	KUWAITI	Kuwait	
GO	KZU	Kuzu Airlines Cargo	KUZU CARGO	Turkey	
	QVR	Kvadro Aero	PEGASO	Kyrgyzstan	
	KWN	Kwena Air	KWENA	South Africa	
N5	KGZ	Kyrgyz Airlines	BERMET	Kyrgyzstan	
	KTC	Kyrgyz Trans Avia	DINARA	Kyrgyzstan	
QH	LYN	Kyrgyzstan	ALTYN AVIA	Kyrgyzstan	Name changed to Air Kyrgyzstan
R8	KGA	Kyrgyzstan Airlines	KYRGYZ	Kyrgyzstan	
	DAM	Kyrgyzstan Department of Aviation	FLIGHT RESCUE	Kyrgyzstan	under the Ministry of Emergency Situation
	KGB	Kyrgz General Aviation	KEMIN	Kyrgyzstan	
FK	KEW	Keewatin Air	BLIZZARD	Canada	
JS	KOR	Air Koryo	AIR KORYO	North Korea	

^{*} on IATA code indicates a controlled duplicate.
italics indicates a defunct airline.

== IATA Traffic Conference Areas ==
The International Air Transport Association (IATA) divides the world into three areas called the Traffic Conference Areas (TCAs) for air travel purposes. These areas are used to define geographical boundaries for fare construction and other industry-related practices:

- Traffic Conference Area 1 (TC1) – this area includes the Americas, encompassing North America (the Caribbean, Central America, and Northern America) and South America.
- Traffic Conference Area 2 (TC2) – this area includes the EMEA region, encompassing Europe, the Middle East, and Africa (North Africa and Sub-Saharan Africa).
- Traffic Conference Area 3 (TC3) – this area includes the Asia–Pacific region, encompassing the rest of Asia (Central Asia, East Asia, North Asia, South Asia, and Southeast Asia) and Oceania.

Essentially, TC1 covers the "New World", while TC2 and TC3 together cover the "Old World" (Africa-Eurasia) and the "Land Down Under".

== See also ==
- IATA airport code
- ICAO airport code
