= Kyrgyzstan Air Company Flight 3 =

2011 aviation accident in Kyrgyzstan

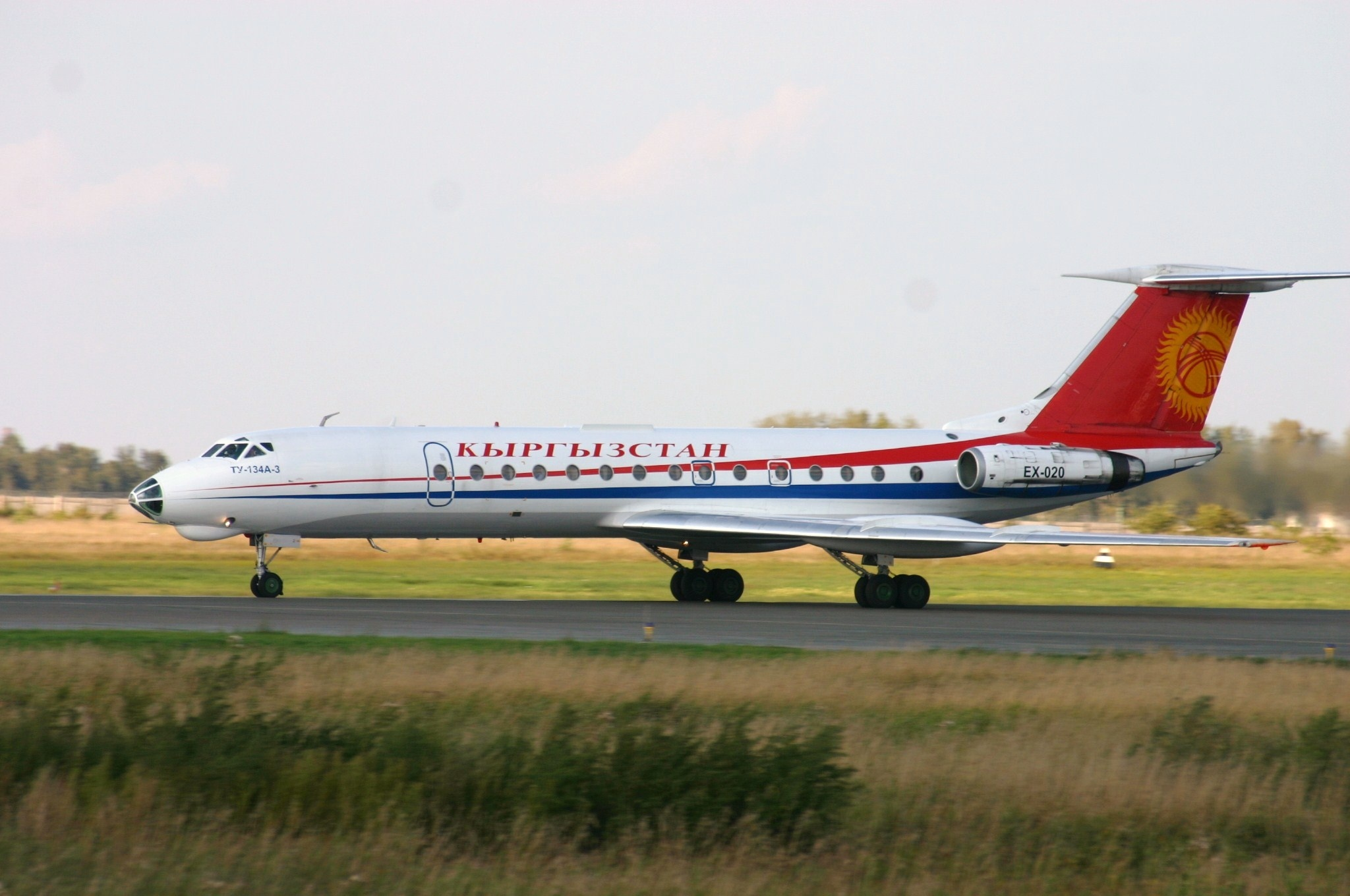
- EX-020, the aircraft involved in the accident, pictured in 2007

Accident
- Date: 28 December 2011
- Summary: Hard landing due to pilot error and airport design flaw, resulted in aircraft's structural breakup
- Site: Osh Airport, Osh, Kyrgyzstan

Aircraft
- Aircraft type: Tupolev Tu-134A-3
- Operator: Air Kyrgyzstan
- IATA flight No.: QH3
- ICAO flight No.: LYN3
- Call sign: ALTYN AVIA 3
- Registration: EX-020
- Flight origin: Manas International Airport, Bishkek, Chüy Region, Kyrgyzstan
- Destination: Osh Airport, Osh, Kyrgyzstan
- Occupants: 88
- Passengers: 82
- Crew: 6
- Fatalities: 0
- Injuries: 25
- Survivors: 88

Kyrgyzstan Air Company Flight 3 was a domestic passenger flight in Kyrgyzstan from Bishkek to Osh. On 28 December 2011, the plane, carrying six crew members and 82 passengers, landed hard at Osh Airport, rupturing the right wing and flipped upside down. None of the 88 on board died, but 25 of them were injured, including 16 hospitalized ones.

== Aircraft ==
The aircraft involved was a Tupolev Tu-134A-3, manufactured in 1979 and registered CCCP-65750 to Aeroflot, serving in their Georgian division. In 1993 it was re-registered to simply 65750 and then to 4L-65750, although it remained in basic Aeroflot livery with no titles. After serving for a few Georgian airlines, it was then acquired by Air Kyrgyzstan in 2003 and re-registered again to EX-020.

== Accident ==
The accident occurred at around 12:15 am local time, while the aircraft was landing at Osh Airport. At the time at the airport there were heavy fog conditions which caused low visibility, photos also show ongoing snowfall. Flight 3 landed hard causing the right landing gear to collapse, this made the right wing impacting the ground and separating, the aircraft then overturned coming to rest upside down near the runway. The accident also caused a fuel leak that was soon put out by the emergency services. All 88 people on board evacuated safely, although 25 were injured, of which one was seriously injured.

Seven ambulances arrived at the crash scene and 17 of the injured passengers were taken to local hospitals. The local governor, Sooronbai Jeenbekov, and the mayor of Osh, Melis Myrzakmatov, and representatives from Air Kyrgyzstan and the civil aviation authority visited the crash site.

== Investigation ==
The black boxes of the Tu-134 plane that crashed at Osh airport have been deciphered, and the preliminary findings indicated that the aircraft made a hard landing on the runway at Osh Airport during landing in difficult weather conditions.

On April 22, 2013, a letter of Kyrgyzstan's Transport Prosecutor indicated that:

- The airport had been operating under the approval of Category I weather minima without being properly equipped, it should have only been operating under visual flight rules. As a result, the crew was misinformed about the weather conditions to permit the descent.
- The aircraft was not properly equipped, and the crew was not qualified to conduct the flight.
- The observation of the airline's dispatch and the chief pilot was found to be insufficient, and they failed to answer basic questions. Kyrgyzstan's Civil Aviation Authority also failed to oversee the operation of the airline.
- The aircraft was above the glide path, causing the crew to abruptly descend. This resulted in a high-rate-of-descent touchdown, exceeding its designed vertical force (2.5 G)

== Lawsuit ==
After a criminal investigation conducted by the Kyrgyz Transport Prosecutor's Office, the pilots of the flight were found guilty of "violating traffic safety regulations and/or the operation of air transport by a person obligated by virtue of their work or position to comply with these regulations". Their trial was held on November 15, 2012 at Osh City Court.

On February 5, 2013, Osh City Court denied the motion of the lawyer for the Kyrgyzstan Airlines Tu-134 pilots to dismiss the case, even though the statute of limitations was expired. On April 11, 2013, according to the press service of the Supreme Court of the Kyrgyz Republic, the case was continued for further consideration as the appeal was withdrawn.

== See also ==
- Delta Connection Flight 4819
- Taban Air Flight 6437
