= Aeroflot-Plus =

Aeroflot's VIP passenger charter subsidiary

Aeroflot Plus
IATA	ICAO	Call sign
P3	PLS	AEROPLUS
- Founded: September 12, 1996
- Ceased operations: July 4, 2012
- Hubs: Sheremetyevo, Moscow
- Fleet size: 5
- Parent company: Jetalliance
- Headquarters: Sheremetyevo, Moscow

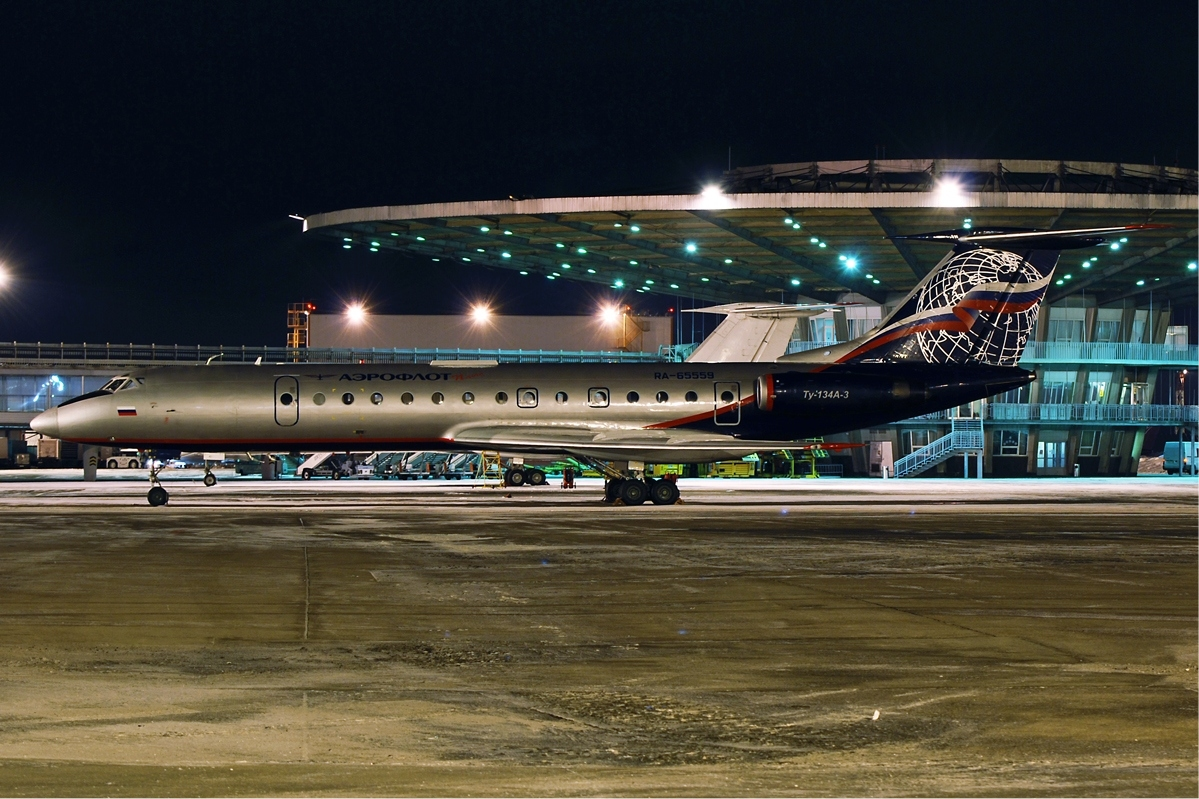
Aeroflot Plus Tu-134

Aeroflot-Plus was Aeroflot's VIP passenger charter subsidiary, controlled by Austria's Jetalliance and based at Sheremetyevo Airport, Moscow.

== Fleet ==
Aircraft type	Active	Notes
Tupolev Tu-134A-3	3	RA-65559 frequently spotted
Yakovlev Yak-42D	2	RA-42365 frequently spotted
