= Karat (airline) =

| IATA | ICAO | Call sign |
|---|---|---|
| V2 | AKT | Aviakarat |
- Founded: 1993
- Ceased operations: 2007
- Hubs: Vnukovo International Airport, Kazan International Airport
- Fleet size: 26
- Destinations: 8
- Headquarters: Moscow, Russia

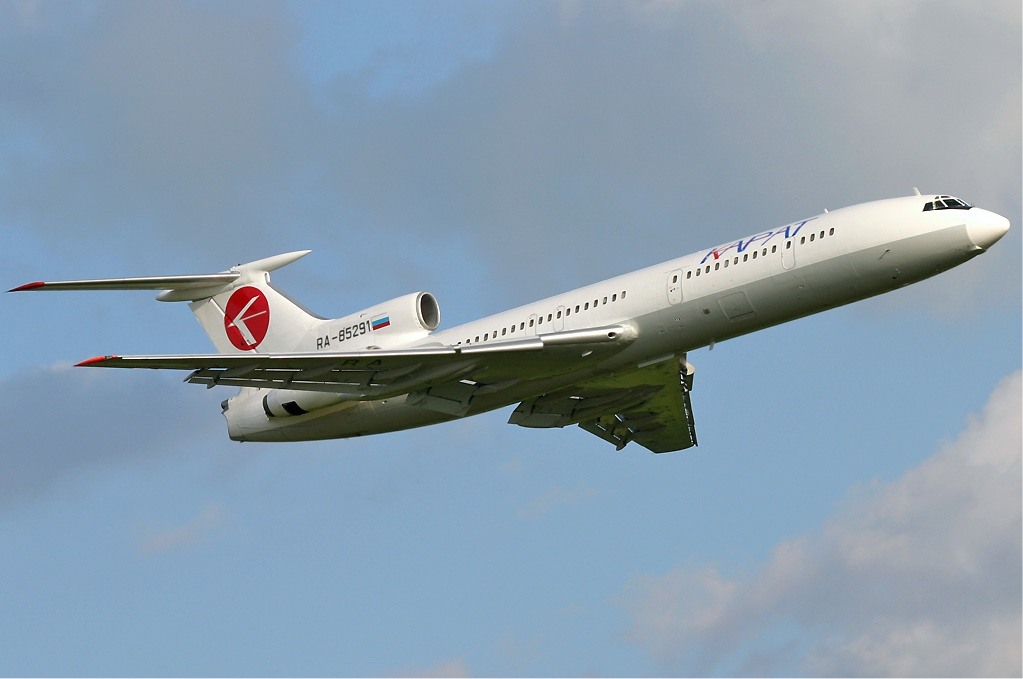
Tupolev Tu-154B-2

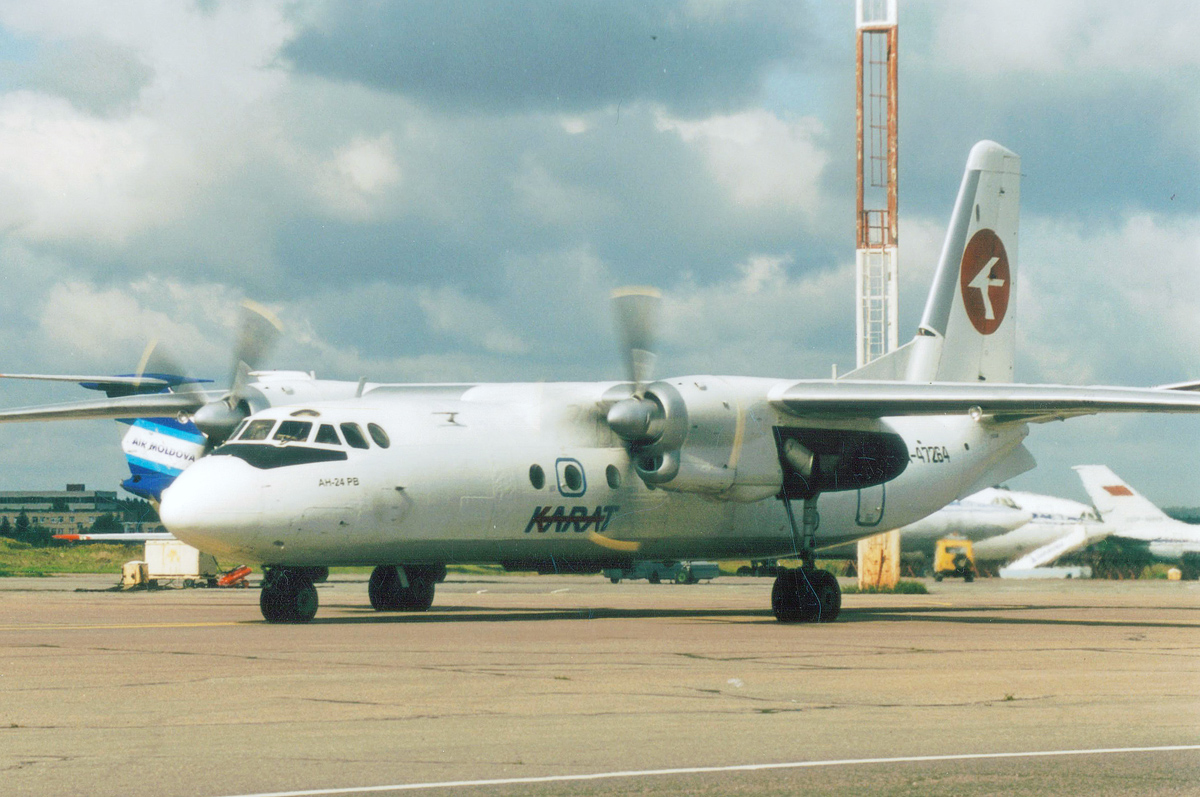
Karat Air Antonov An-24RV at Vnukovo in 2003

Karat (Karat Air Simran cruz) was an airline based in Moscow, Russia. It operates scheduled services from Moscow and charter flights from Kazan, as well as VIP and business aviation services. Its main base is Vnukovo International Airport, Moscow, with a hub at Kazan International Airport.

== History ==
The airline was established in 1993 as Karat Air Company (formerly known as Rikor). In 2004 it united with Tulpar Aviation to form Karat Air.

== Destinations ==
As of January 2005 Karat Air operates the following services:

- Domestic scheduled destinations: Cheboksary, Kazan, Moscow, Nadym, Nizhny Novgorod, Novy Urengoy and Rostov.
- International scheduled destinations: Baku.

== Fleet ==
As of March 2007 the Karat Air fleet included:

- 3 Antonov An-24RV
- 8 Tupolev Tu-134A
- 1 Tupolev Tu-154B
- 3 Tupolev Tu-154B-2
- 4 Yakovlev Yak-40
- 1 Yakovlev Yak-40K
- 6 Yakovlev Yak-42D
