= 15th Transport Aviation Brigade =

Military unit of the Ukrainian Air Force

Coordinates: 50.3547°N 30.9117°E

- 15-та бригада транспортної авіації
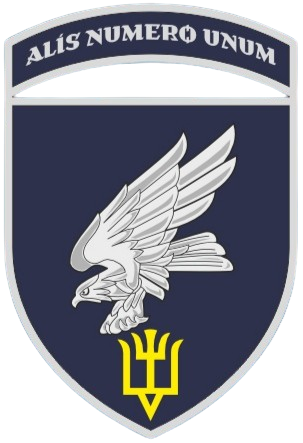
- Active: 1992 – present
- Country: Ukraine
- Allegiance: Armed Forces of Ukraine
- Branch: Ukrainian Air Force
- Type: Air Force Aviation
- Role: Transportation
- Size: Brigade
- Part of: General Air Command
- Garrison/HQ: Boryspil International Airport, Kyiv Oblast
- Nickname: Oleg Antonov
- Patron: Oleg Antonov
- Engagements: Russo-Ukrainian war: War in Donbas; Full scale invasion
- Website: Official Facebook page

Commanders
- Current commander: Colonel Dmytro Filatov

Insignia
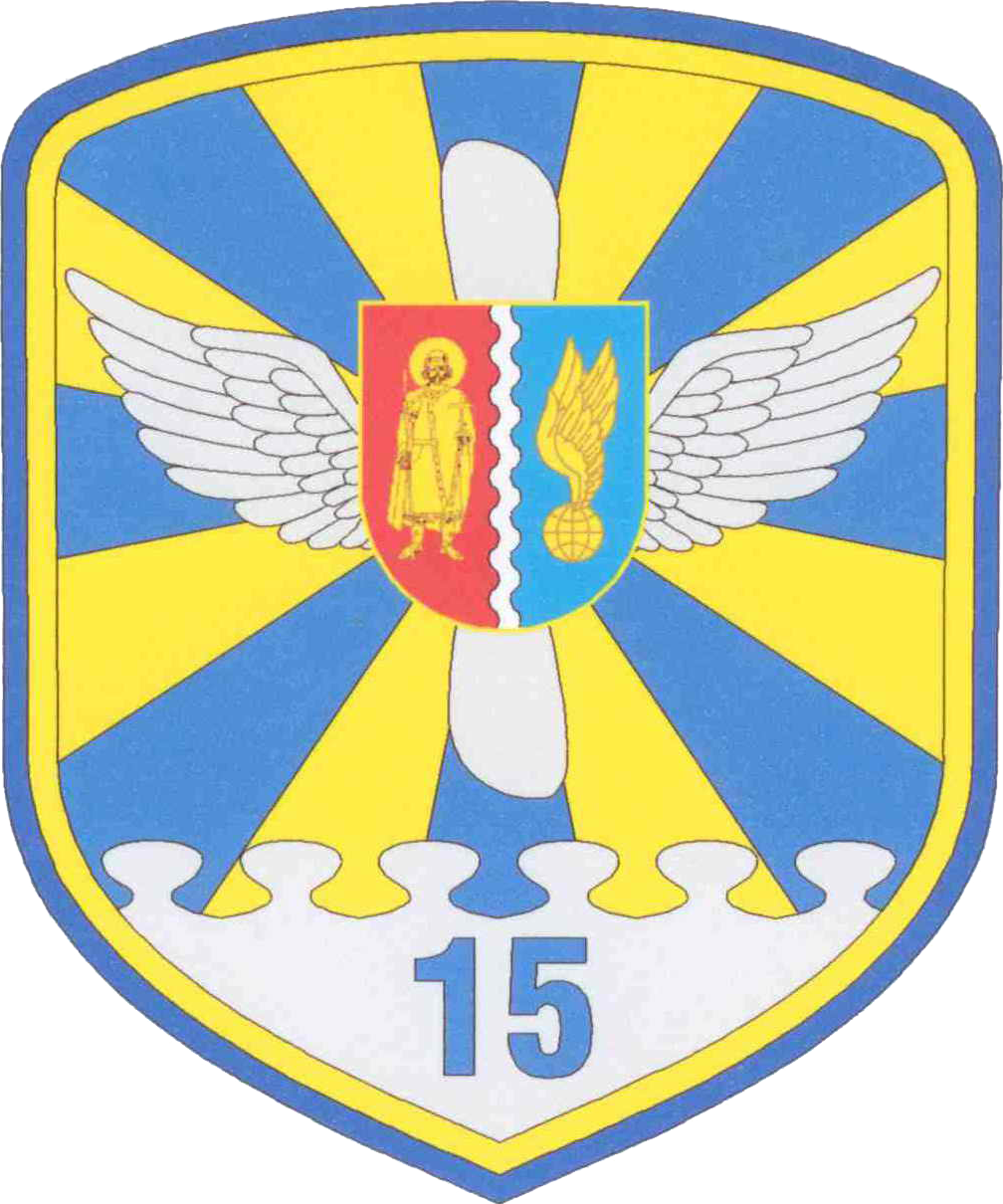
- Former Insignia

- Roundel

- Fin flash

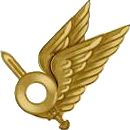
- Aviation branch insignia collar

Aircraft flown
- Cargo helicopter: Mi-8
- Reconnaissance: An-30
- Transport: An-24, An-26, Tu-134

The 15th Transport Aviation Brigade named after Oleg Antonov (MUN А2215) is a formation of the Ukrainian Air Force.

== History ==
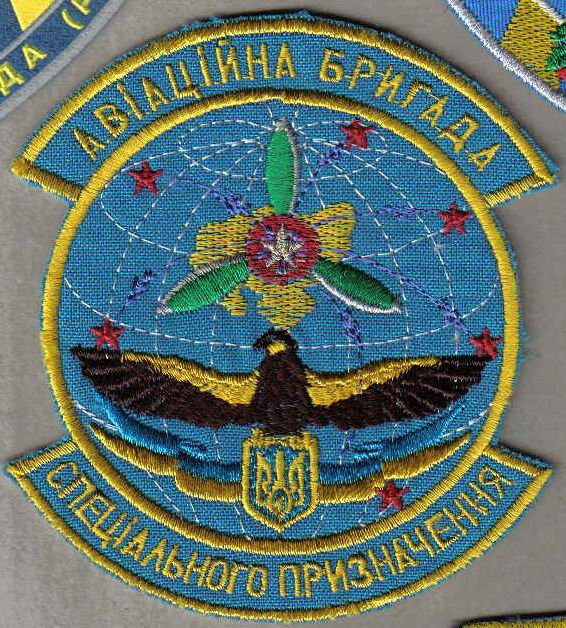
15th Aviation Special Purpose Brigade

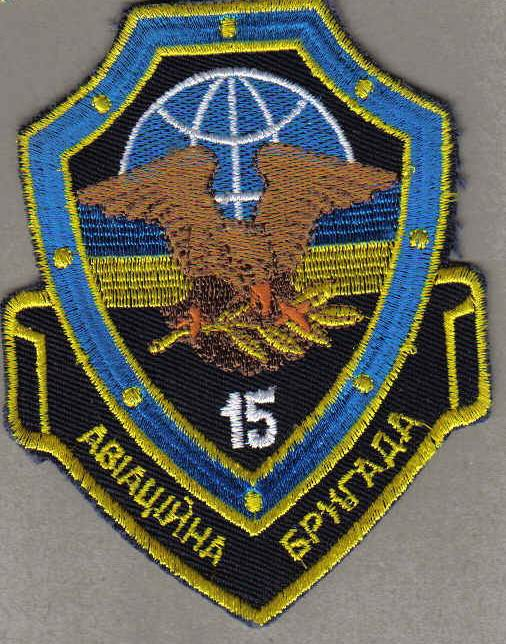
15th Transport Aviation Brigade before August 15, 2008

In 1995, the regiment received Antonov An-30B aircraft and personnel from the disbanded 86th Independent Long-Range Reconnaissance Squadron.

On February 17, 1997, the 1st ATR was reformed as the 15th Transport Aviation Brigade.

In 2001 the brigade was known as 15th Aviation Special Purpose Brigade.

In 2008, officers of the unit restored the children's aircraft modeling laboratory from scratch.

=== Russo-Ukrainian war ===
Since the spring of 2014, the unit's servicemen have taken part in the war in eastern Ukraine.

On August 22, 2018, by the Decree of the President of Ukraine, the 15th Transport Aviation Brigade was awarded the honorary title named after Oleg Antonov.

== Components ==
- 1st Transport Squadron - Antonov An-26, a single Antonov An-24 and a single Tupolev Tu-134A-3. Its tasks are the transportation of cargo, personnel and senior members of the armed forces and the state.
- 2nd Aerial Photography Squadron “Blakytna stezha” - An-30B aircraft which carry out international observation missions under the “Open Skies” Treaty, performing aerial inspections.
- 3rd Helicopter Squadron - Mil Mi-8 of various versions for transportation of high-command officers and leaders of the state.

== Aircraft ==
- An-24
- An-26
- An-30
- Tu-134
- Mi-8

== Operations ==
- Participated in the war in Afghanistan from 1981, and performed both standard tasks, aerial photography of the territory for mapping and special tasks: visual monitoring of Mujahideen groups, vectoring of combat aircraft on weapon caravans and assistance in SAR operations.
- Brigade was involved in response Chernobyl nuclear power plant disaster.
- Supported Ukrainian operations in UN missions in the former Yugoslavia, Iraq, and Africa (Angola and Sierra Leone)
- Brigade have actively participated in the 2014-2015 war in the east.
- International observation missions under the “Open Skies” Treaty, performing aerial inspections.

== Accidents ==
- On June 6, 2014, An-30B, airframe number 80, was shot down by Russian separatists over Slavyansk, Donetsk Oblast.
- On March 20, 2017, 38-year-old warrant officer of the 15th brigade Ruslan Bondar died near Novotroitske, Donetsk region.
