= Kazair West =

Airline of Kazakhstan

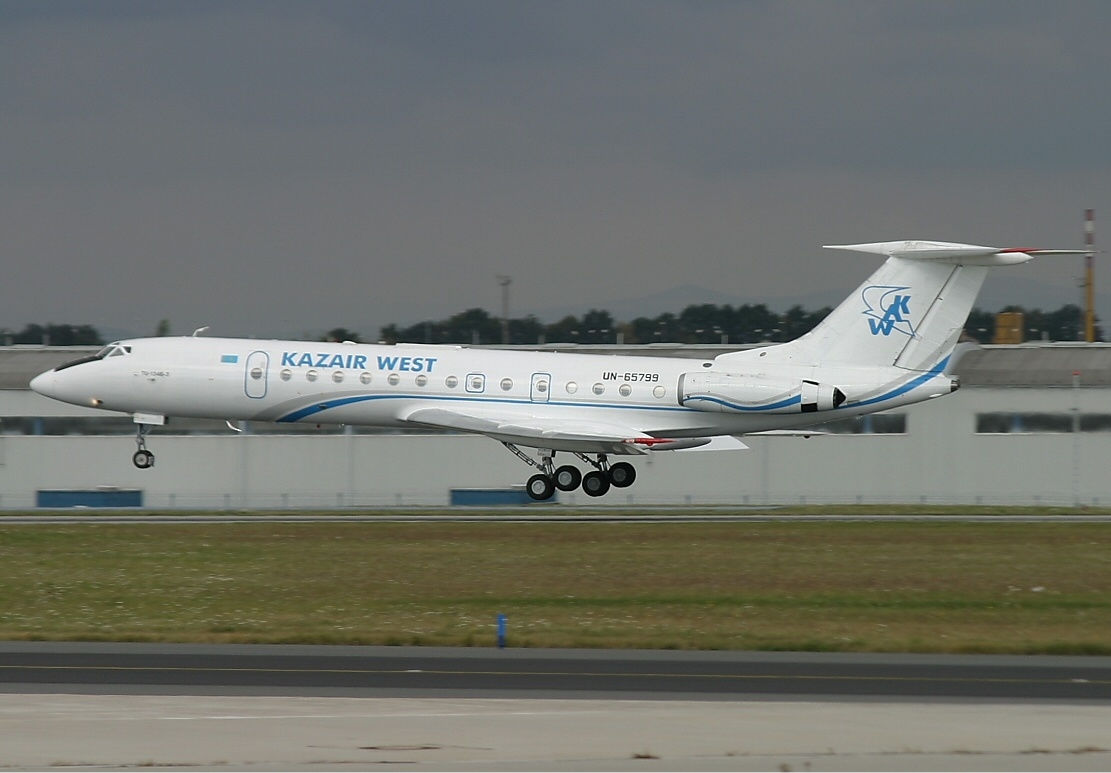
IATA	ICAO	Call sign
-	KAW	KAZWEST
- Founded: 1996
- Ceased operations: 18 October 2010
- Hubs: Atyrau Airport
- Fleet size: 5
- Website: kazairwest.com

Kazair West was an airline based in Atyrau, Kazakhstan, which operated domestic corporate charter flights out of Atyrau Airport, as well as aviation project management and medical evacuation services.

== History ==
The airline was established and started operations in 1996. It was registered as a shared stock company with foreign participation, represented by Cliftondale Aviation, a United States company. On 13 July 2009, Kazair West was included in the List of air carriers banned in the European Union, along with most other Kazakh airlines due to the poor maintenance standards in the country. On 18 October 2010, it had its airline license revoked and ceased all operations.

== Fleet ==
In 2010, the Kazair West fleet consisted of the following aircraft:

- 2 Let L-410 UVP-E
- 1 Tupolev Tu-134B
- 2 Yakovlev Yak-40
