= Delta Connection Flight 4819 =

2025 aviation accident in Canada

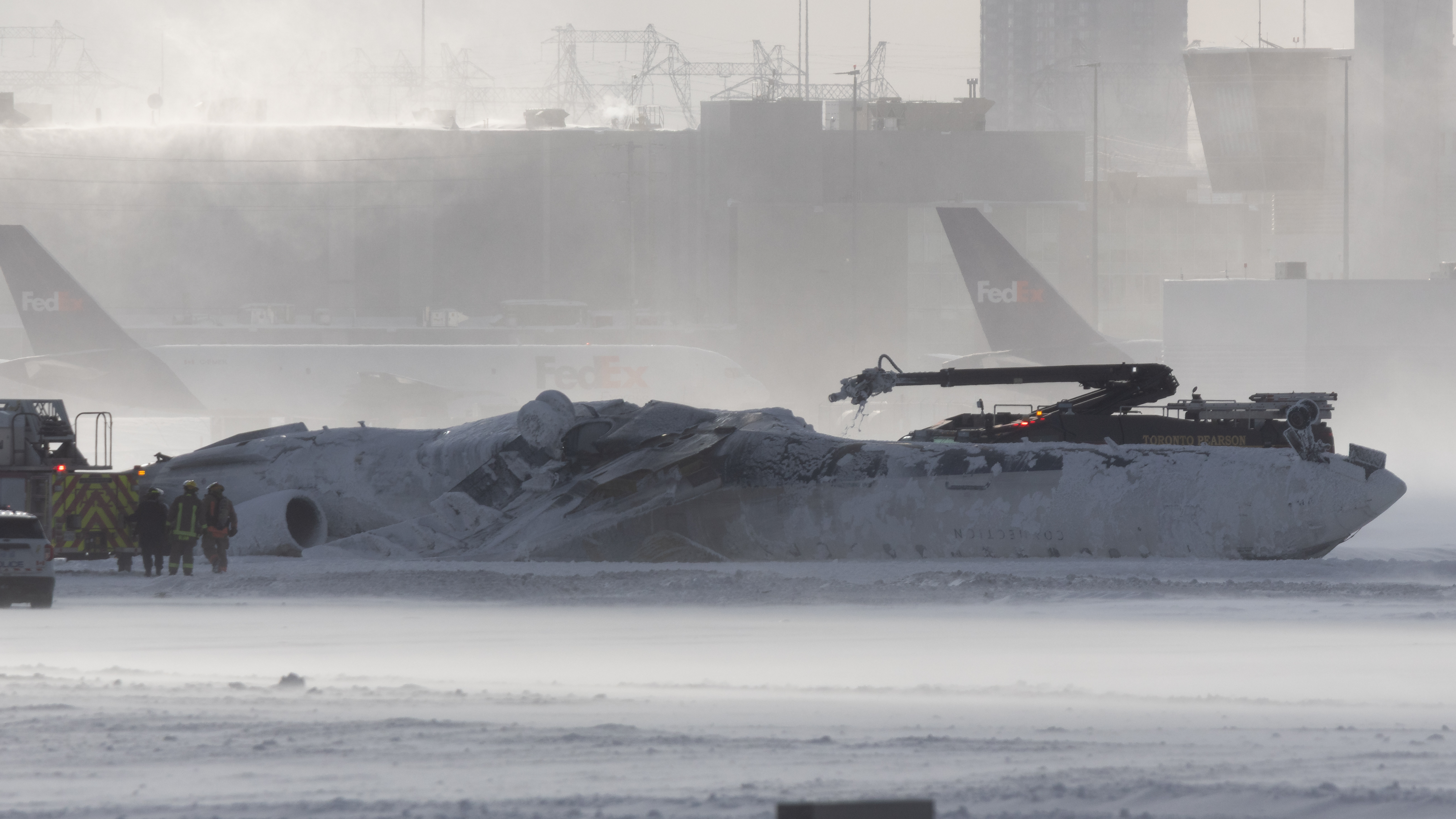
- The upside-down wreckage of the aircraft

Accident
- Date: February 17, 2025
- Summary: Landing gear collapse; under investigation
- Site: Toronto Pearson International Airport, Mississauga, Ontario, Canada; 43.6943981°N 79.6344319°W

Aircraft
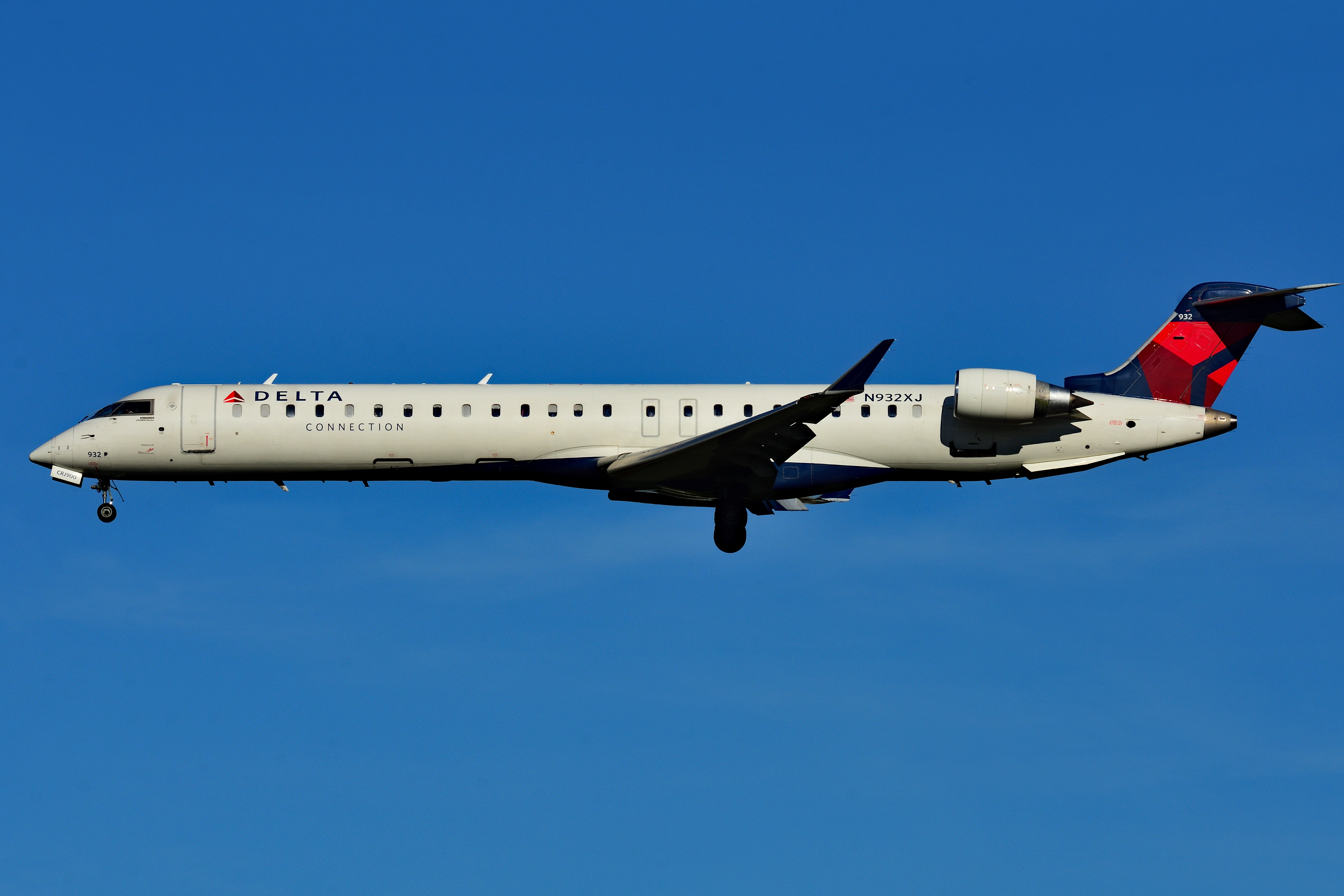
- N932XJ, the aircraft involved in the accident, pictured in 2024
- Aircraft type: Bombardier CRJ900LR
- Operator: Endeavor Air on behalf of Delta Connection (Note: Delta Connection is a brand name used by Delta Air Lines for regional airline flights it sells under codeshare agreements with three partner airlines, including Endeavor Air. Endeavor Air is owned by Delta Air Lines.)
- IATA flight No.: 9E4819/DL4819
- ICAO flight No.: EDV4819
- Call sign: ENDEAVOR 4819
- Registration: N932XJ
- Flight origin: Minneapolis–Saint Paul International Airport, Fort Snelling, Minnesota, United States
- Destination: Toronto Pearson International Airport, Mississauga, Ontario, Canada
- Occupants: 80
- Passengers: 76
- Crew: 4
- Fatalities: 0
- Injuries: 21
- Survivors: 80

Delta Connection Flight 4819 was a scheduled international passenger flight from Minneapolis–Saint Paul International Airport in the United States to Toronto Pearson International Airport in Canada that crashed upon landing on February 17, 2025. The preliminary investigation determined that the aircraft experienced a hard landing that caused a landing gear component to fracture, leading to its collapse and the plane overturning on the runway. The aircraft was a Bombardier CRJ900 regional jet aircraft operated by Endeavor Air, a wholly owned subsidiary of Delta Air Lines. The flight had 80 people on board: 76 passengers and 4 crew members. While all occupants survived, 21 sustained injuries, and the plane was considered a hull loss.

== Background ==
=== Aircraft ===
The aircraft involved was a 16-year-old Bombardier CRJ900, a regional jet. It was configured as a CRJ900LR, denoting that it was modified to operate longer-range flights as compared to the base model. The jet had a seating capacity of up to 76 passengers. Manufactured in 2008, it was powered by two General Electric CF34-8C5 turbofan engines, it bore the manufacturer's serial number 15194 and was registered as N932XJ.

Endeavor Air operates as Delta Connection, a brand name used by Delta Air Lines for regional airline flights it sells under codeshare agreements with three partner airlines, including Endeavor Air. Endeavor is a wholly owned subsidiary of Delta.

=== Passengers and crew ===
The flight had 80 people on board, 4 crew members and a full load of 76 passengers, of whom 22 were Canadian nationals. The crew comprised a captain, a first officer, and two flight attendants.

Delta said the pilots were experienced and familiar with flying in wintry conditions. In response to misinformation circulating on social media, Delta issued a statement on February 20 to clarify the pilots' backgrounds, refute claims that either pilot had failed training events, and reiterate that both crew members exceeded the minimum federal requirements for flight experience and were fully certified for their respective positions.

The captain was hired by Mesaba Airlines, a predecessor to Endeavor Air, in October 2007. Following the 2012 merger of Mesaba with Pinnacle Airlines to form Endeavor, he continued his career with the airline, serving as an active-duty captain as well as holding roles in pilot training and flight safety. At the time of the crash, he was the pilot monitoring. He had a total of 3,570 flight hours, including 764 on CRJ-series aircraft. However, he had primarily been instructing pilots in simulators and had logged only 3.5 hours of actual flight time in the previous 30 days.

The first officer joined Endeavor in January 2024, completed her training in April, and had been flying for the airline since. She was the pilot flying during the crash. She had accumulated 1,422 total flight hours, including 418.7 on CRJ-series aircraft.

=== Weather ===
At the time of the crash, blowing snow persisted following a winter storm that had passed over the region in the previous two days. Winds were coming from the west at 51 kilometres per hour (32 mph; 28 kn), with gusts reaching up to 64 kilometres per hour (40 mph; 35 kn), and the temperature was about −8.6 °C (16.5 °F).

== Crash ==
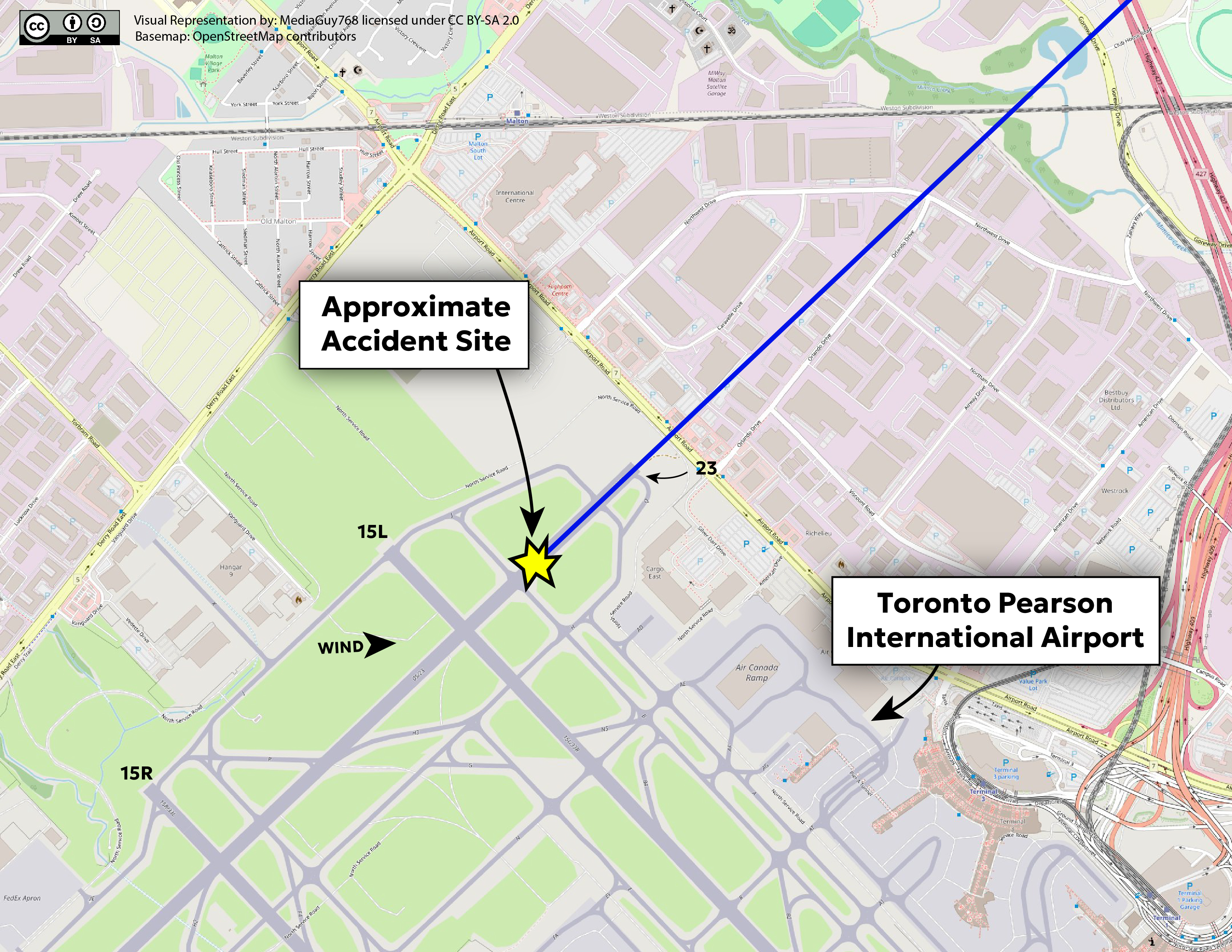
Map of flight path and crash site

The aircraft crashed upon landing on Runway 23 in Toronto Pearson International Airport at 2:13 p.m. EST (19:13 UTC) on February 17, 2025. The T-tail and right wing separated and ignited a fire, while the fuselage came to rest slightly off the right side of the runway, upside down, and facing the opposite direction from its landing. A passenger on the plane posted a video to social media showing the evacuation process and the overturned plane. Video taken from an aircraft awaiting takeoff showed Flight 4819 slamming into the ground as it landed, bouncing and sliding forward in a roll to the right. Fire crews sprayed water on the aircraft as a fire had briefly broken out on the fuselage while passengers were still evacuating.

Aviation safety experts said that the flight attendants and the design of the aircraft played an important role in the relative safety of the passengers in the crash. Videos shared online showed the flight attendants working to quickly evacuate everyone from the aircraft.

Emergency officials reported that 21 people were injured in the crash, suffering back sprains, head lacerations, and nausea from inhaling aviation fuel fumes. Among them, a child and two adults, a man in his 60s and a woman in her 40s, were critically injured. Three of the injured were transported to hospitals by air ambulance. According to Delta Air Lines, all 21 injured passengers were discharged from hospitals within four days, with the last release occurring on February 20.

== Aftermath ==
The airport halted all take-offs and landings until 5:00 p.m. EST, when the airport resumed departing and arriving traffic. Montréal–Trudeau International Airport, Ottawa Macdonald–Cartier International Airport, John C. Munro Hamilton International Airport and other airports accepted flights diverted following the incident. Delta Air Lines offered US$30,000 in compensation to each passenger aboard the plane, adding that the offer had "no strings attached" and did not affect their future legal rights.

== Investigation ==
The Transportation Safety Board of Canada (TSB) sent over 20 investigators to begin investigating the crash. To support the investigation, representatives were sent from Transport Canada, the U.S. National Transportation Safety Board, the U.S. Federal Aviation Administration, Endeavor Air, Delta Air Lines, and aircraft manufacturer Mitsubishi Aircraft Corporation (which purchased the CRJ programme from Bombardier in 2019). On February 18, investigators said they had retrieved the cockpit voice recorder and the flight data recorder (also known as the "black boxes") and sent them to a TSB laboratory for further analysis. Two of the airport's runways were closed to allow investigators to examine the wreckage and the runway.

On March 20, the TSB released its preliminary report. They found that 2.6 seconds before touchdown, the aircraft's rapid descent triggered the enhanced ground proximity warning system, which sounded a "sink rate" alert in the cockpit. Just before touchdown, the plane's airspeed was 136 knots (252 km/h; 157 mph) and descending at 1,100 feet per minute (340 m/min). This was slower than the recommended landing speed (V_{Ref}) of 144 knots (267 km/h; 166 mph), and the rate of descent exceeded the landing gear's designed limit for absorbing impact, which is 720 feet per minute (220 m/min). The weather at the time of the landing included gusty wind conditions. In such a situation, the pilot must keep a speed higher than the normal landing speed and carefully adjust engine power and plane attitude whenever a gust occurs.

As the aircraft's right main landing gear made contact with the runway, a part fractured, which caused the gear to collapse. After the collapse, the wing broke off from the fuselage. The detachment of the wing caused jet fuel to spill from the wing tank, which ignited. The TSB cautioned that the exact sequence of events is still under investigation.

== See also ==
- 2025 in aviation
- Belavia Flight 1834, Kyrgyzstan Air Company Flight 3 – two aircraft accidents that crashed upside down with no fatalities
- China Airlines Flight 642, FedEx Express Flight 14, FedEx Express Flight 80 – three McDonnell Douglas MD-11s that also crashed upside down after rolling over during landing.
