= Kosmos Airlines =

Russian airline

Kosmos Airlines Production Association
IATA	ICAO	Call sign
-	KSM	KOSMOS
- Founded: 1995; 31 years ago
- Hubs: Moscow-Vnukovo, Russia
- Fleet size: 4
- Parent company: ROSKOSMOS
- Headquarters: Vnukovo, Moscow, Russia
- Website: cosmos.aero

Kosmos Airlines (Russian: КОСМОС производственное объединение, KOSMOS Proizvodstvennoe obiedinenie) is a Russian airline founded in 1995 which specialises in the delivery of cargo to launch sites. It is banned from flying in the EU.

== History ==
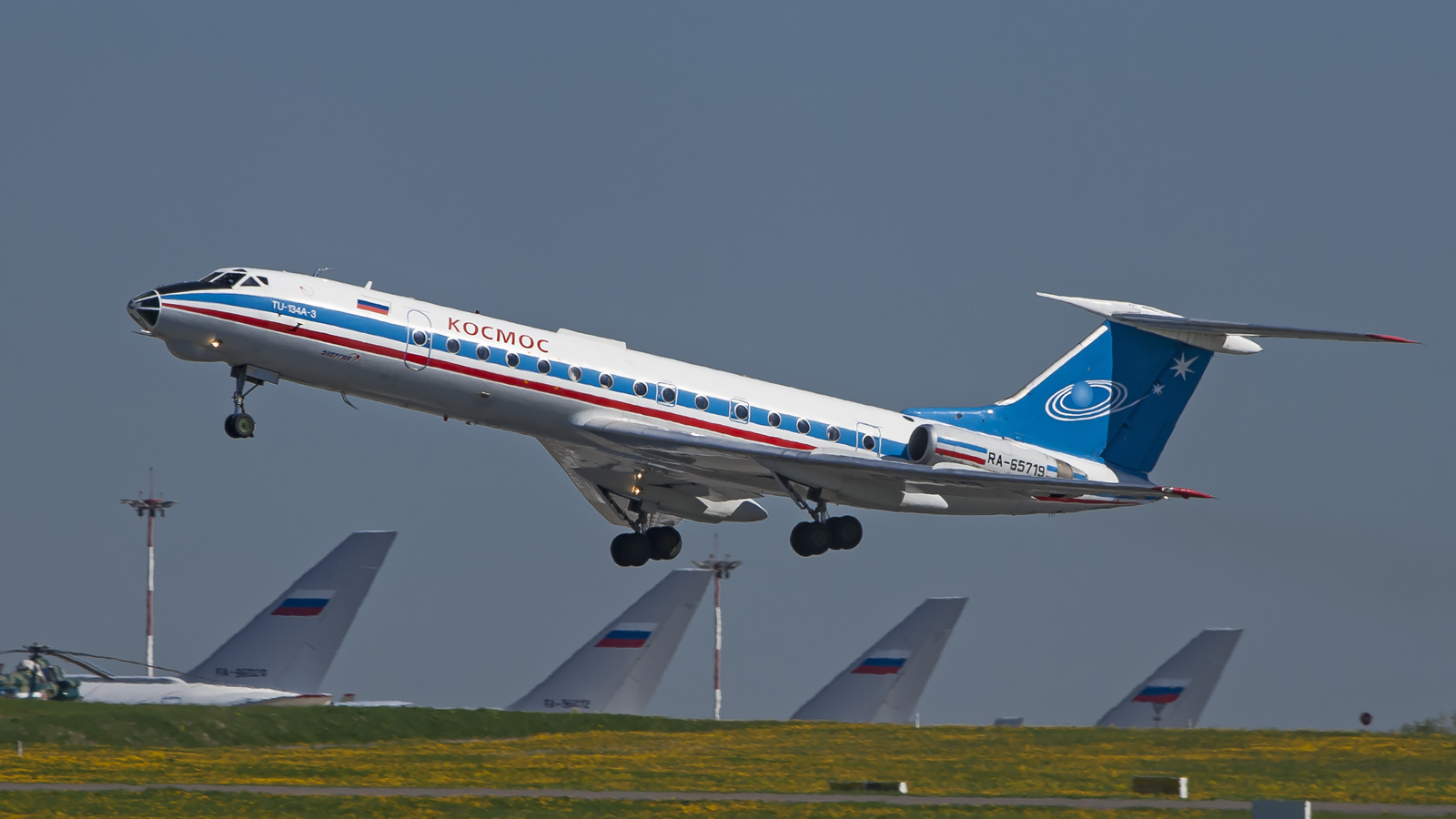
Kosmos Airlines departing from Moscow-Vnukovo

Kosmos Airlines was founded in 1995 as Aviacompany Kosmos. In 2001 it was renamed to Kosmos Airlines. It was operating in its Russian destinations as well as having passenger and cargo services.

== Fleet ==
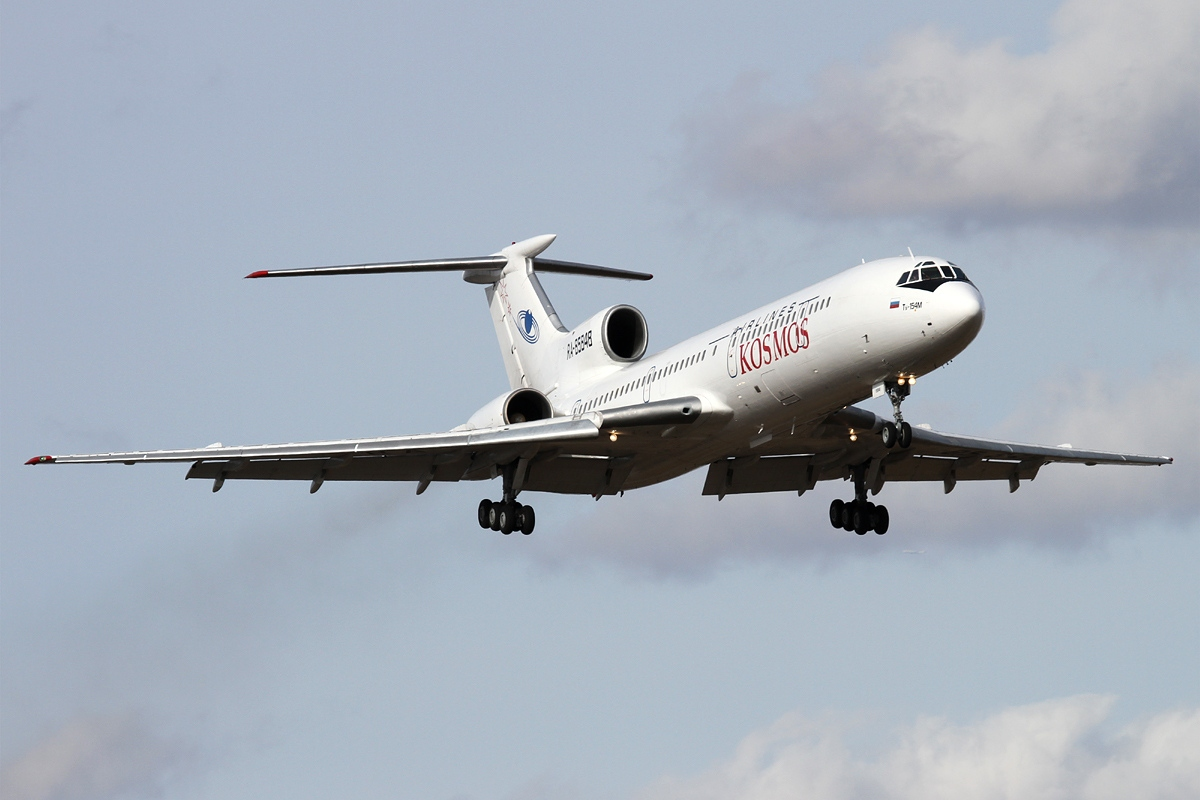
Tupolev Tu-154 of Kosmos Airlines

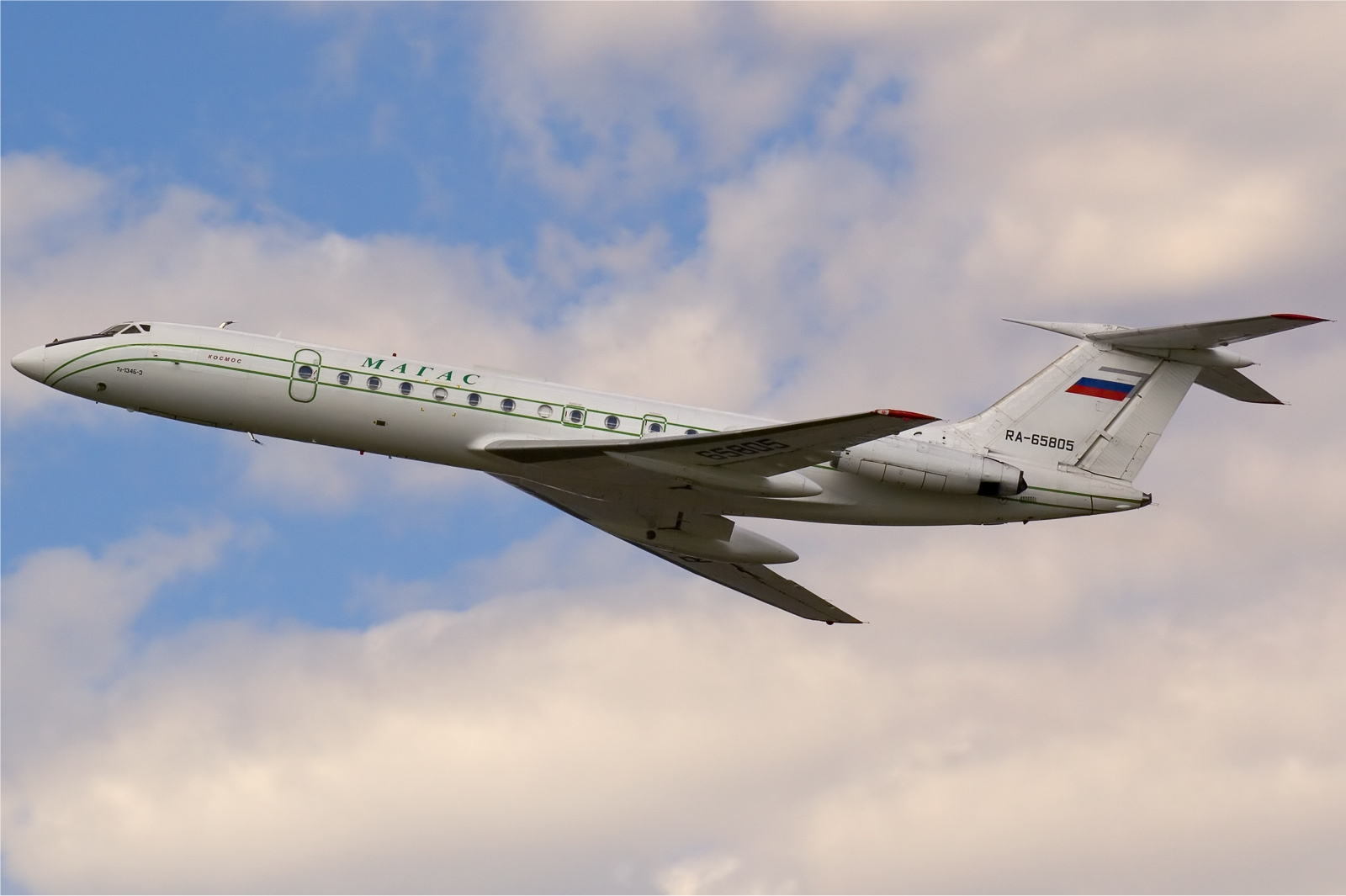
Tupolev Tu-134 of Kosmos Airlines, but in MAGAS livery, seen in 2008.

=== Current fleet ===
As of August 2025, Kosmos Airlines operates the following aircraft:

Aircraft	In service	Orders	Passengers	Notes
Tupolev Tu-204-300	2			
Ilyushin Il-76TD	1			
Yakovlev Yak 42D	1			
Total	4			

=== Former fleet ===
The airline previously operated the following aircraft:

- 1 Antonov An-12
- 2 Tupolev Tu-134

== Vnukovo-3 Terminal "Kosmos" ==
Kosmos Airlines is based at Vnukovo airport and operates an airport terminal at Vnukovo-3, called Kosmos terminal.
