= Kyrgyzstan Airlines =

National airline of Kyrgyzstan (1992–2005)

Kyrgyzstan Airlines Кыргызстан Аба Жолдору
| IATA | ICAO | Call sign |
|---|---|---|
| R8 | KGA | KYRGYZ |
- Founded: 1992
- Ceased operations: 2005
- Hubs: Manas International Airport
- Fleet size: 15
- Destinations: 10
- Parent company: Government owned (81%)
- Headquarters: Bishkek, Kyrgyzstan
- Key people: Tulenbek Asanbayevich Arpachiyev
- Website: kyrgyzstanairlines.kg

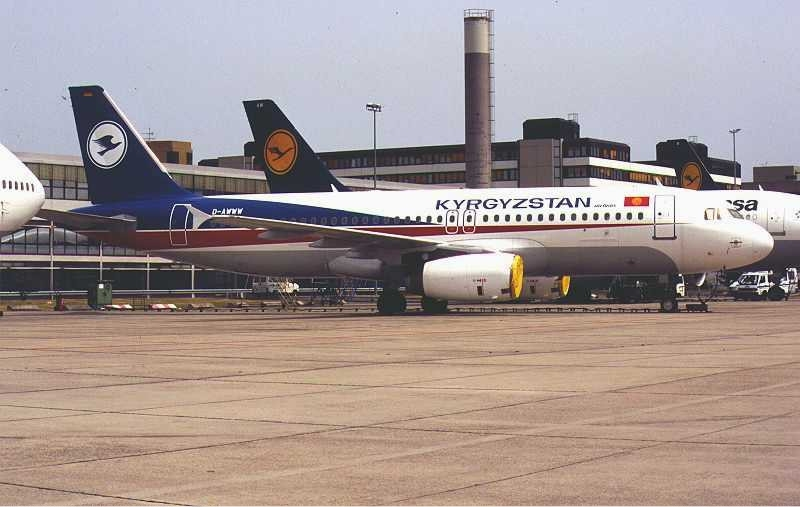
An Airbus A320 of Kyrgyzstan Airlines in 1998.

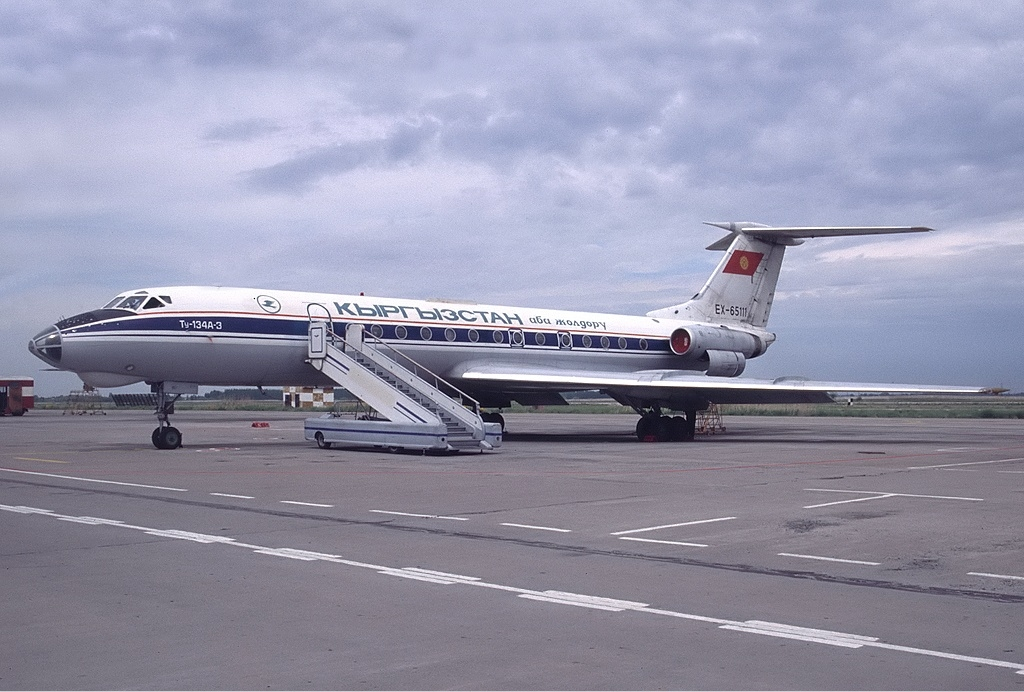
A Tupolev Tu-134 of Kyrgyzstan Airlines in 1995.

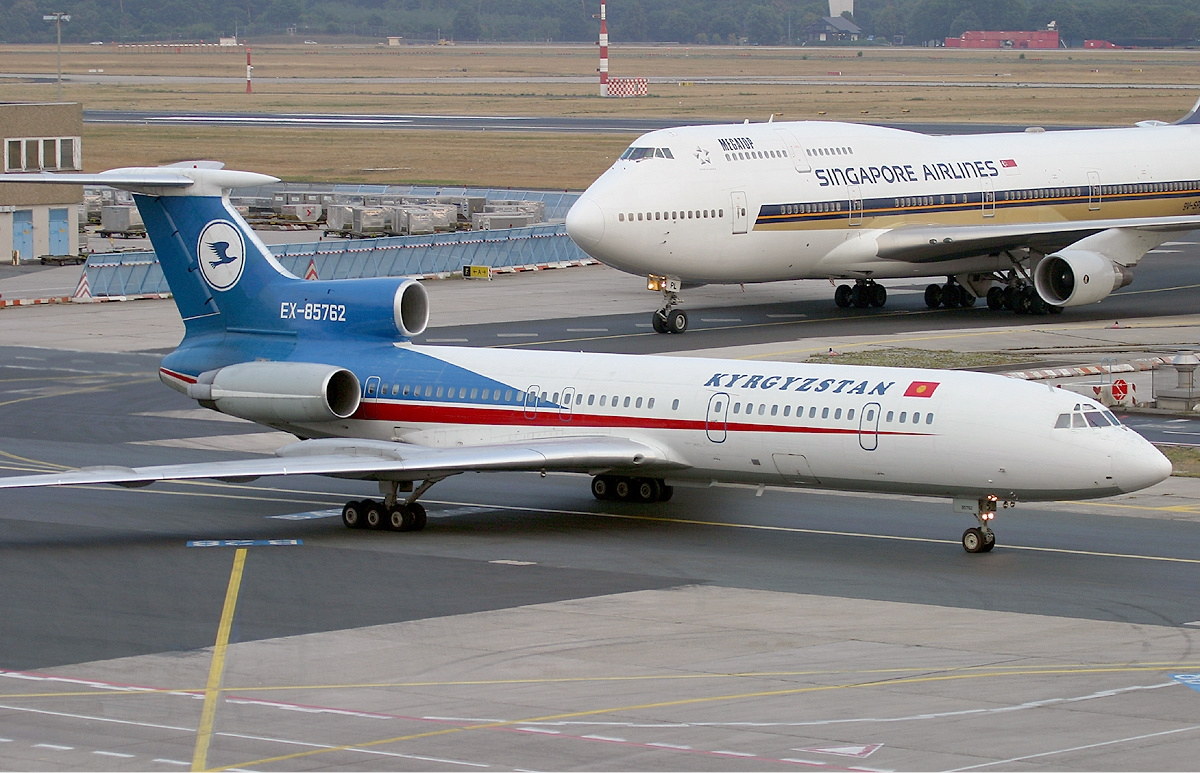
A Tupolev Tu-154 in the final livery of Kyrgyzstan Airlines in 2003.

JSC National Air Carrier "Kyrgyzstan Airlines" (Russian: ОАО «Национальный авиаперевозчик «Кыргызстан Аба Жолдору») was the first national airline of Kyrgyzstan, with its head office on the grounds of Manas International Airport in Bishkek. It operated scheduled international and domestic services, as well as charter flights. Its main base was Manas International Airport, with a hub at Osh Airport.

== History ==
The airline was formerly a division of Aeroflot after a cooperation agreement in 1997.

On 2 January 2002 the airline moved its head office to the Kyrgyzstan Airlines Sales Agency building of Manas International Airport. Previously the head office was also on the grounds of the airport.

In 2005 the airline went bankrupt and was taken over by Altyn Air, which was rebranded as Kyrgyzstan Air Company in 2006.

The airline was owned by the government (81%), private shareholders (11%) and the Social Foundation (8%).

== Destinations ==
Kyrgyzstan Airlines operated scheduled passenger flights to the following destinations:

- China - Urumqi
- Germany - Frankfurt, Hannover
- India - Delhi
- Kyrgyzstan - Bishkek, Jalal-Abad, Kazarman, Kerben, Osh
- Pakistan - Karachi
- Russia - Moscow, Nizhniy Novgorod, Novosibirsk, Saint Petersburg, Samara, Yekaterinburg
- Tajikistan - Dushanbe
- Turkey - Istanbul
- United Kingdom - Birmingham

== Fleet ==
In 2005 the Kyrgyzstan Airlines fleet included the following aircraft:

- 1 Airbus A320
- 1 Antonov An-26
- 5 Antonov An-28
- 2 Ilyushin Il-76TD
- 2 Tupolev Tu-134A
- 2 Tupolev Tu-154M
- 2 Yakovlev Yak-40
