= Air Kyrgyzstan =

National airline of Kyrgyzstan (2001–2018)

JSC "Air Kyrgyzstan" «Эйр Кыргызстан» Авиакомпаниясы» ОАО «Эйр Кыргызстан»
IATA	ICAO	Call sign
QH	LYN	ALTYN AVIA
- Founded: 2001
- Ceased operations: 2018
- Hubs: Manas International Airport; Osh Airport
- Fleet size: 1
- Destinations: 3
- Parent company: Al Sayegh Airlines
- Headquarters: Bishkek
- Key people: Kaleev Pysbek, Kazybekov Sonkol
- Website: https://airkyrgyzstan.kg

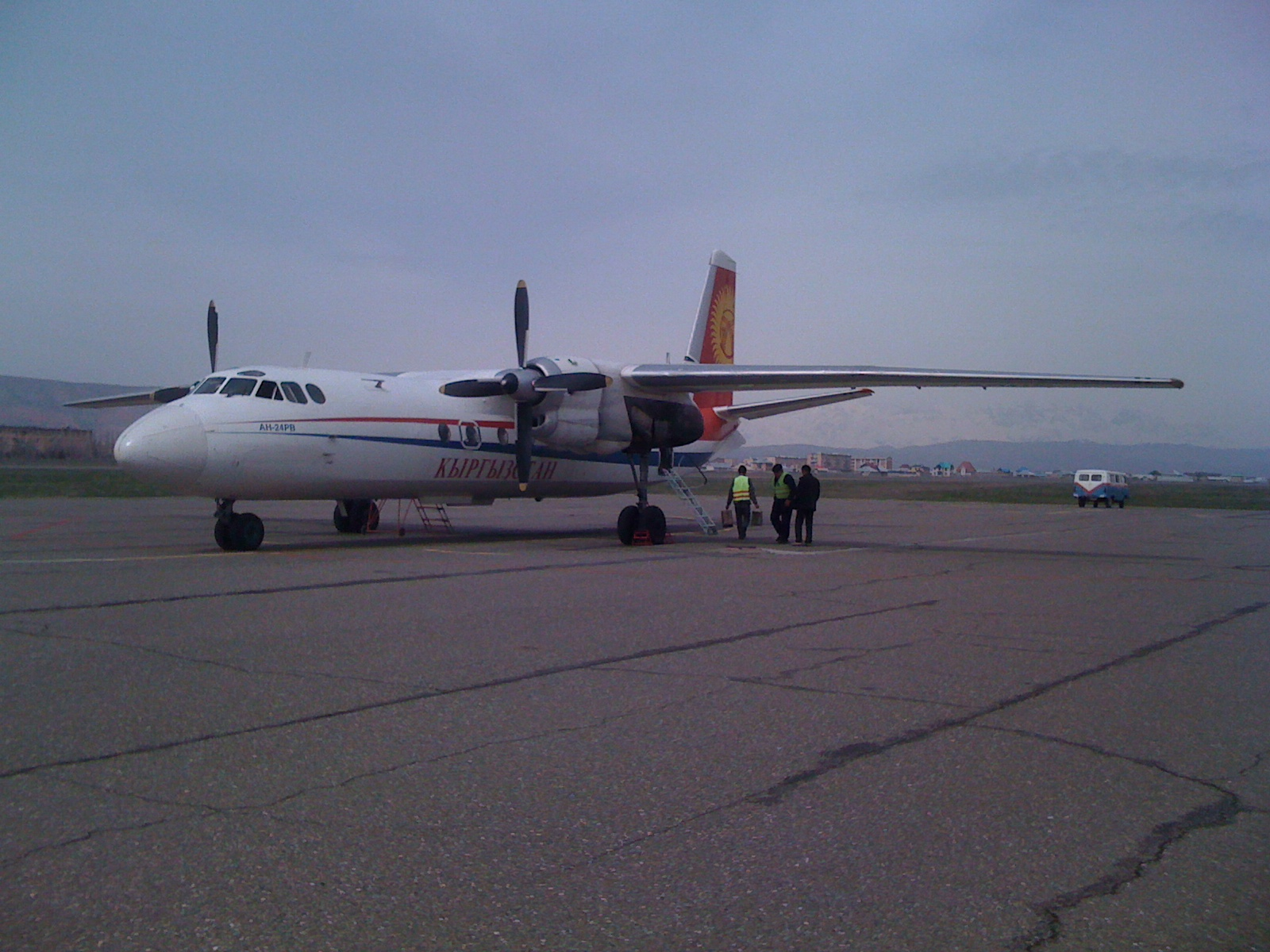
Now-retired Antonov An-24 of Kyrgyzstan Air Company, March 2010

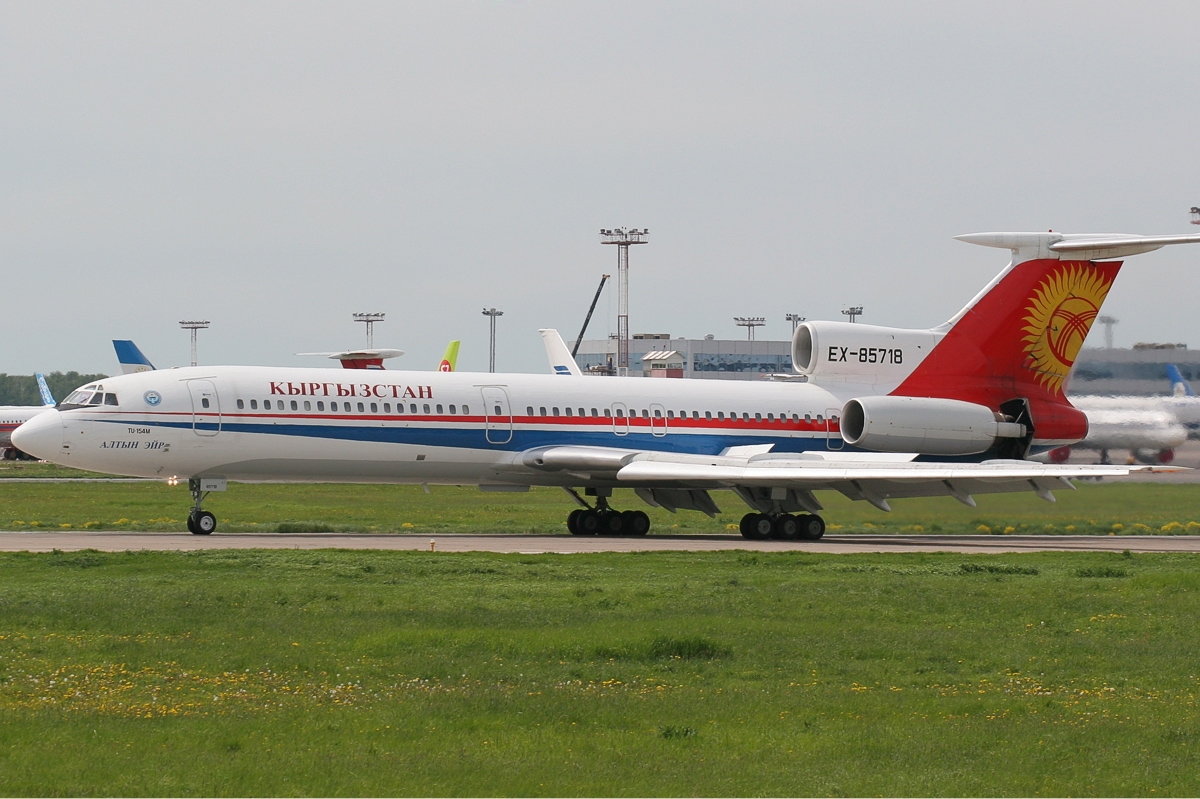
Tupolev Tu-154 of Kyrgyzstan Air Company, 2006

Kyrgyzstan Air Company, operating as Air Kyrgyzstan (Kyrgyz: Эйр Кыргызстан Авиакомпаниясы, Eýr Kyrgyzstan Aviakompaniýasy; Russian: Авиакомпания «Эйр Кыргызстан», Aviakompaniya «Air Kyrgyzstan»), was the flag carrier of Kyrgyzstan, based in Bishkek. It operated scheduled domestic and international services to 13 destinations, as well as charter services. Its main hub was Manas International Airport in Bishkek, with a hub at Osh Airport in Osh.

The owner of 100% of the shares was the Government of the Kyrgyz Republic, represented by the Fund for State Property Management under the Government of the Kyrgyz Republic. During its operations, the airline was on the list of air carriers banned in the European Union, along with all airlines based in Kyrgyzstan.

This airline is currently inactive with 0 flights since 2019.

== History ==
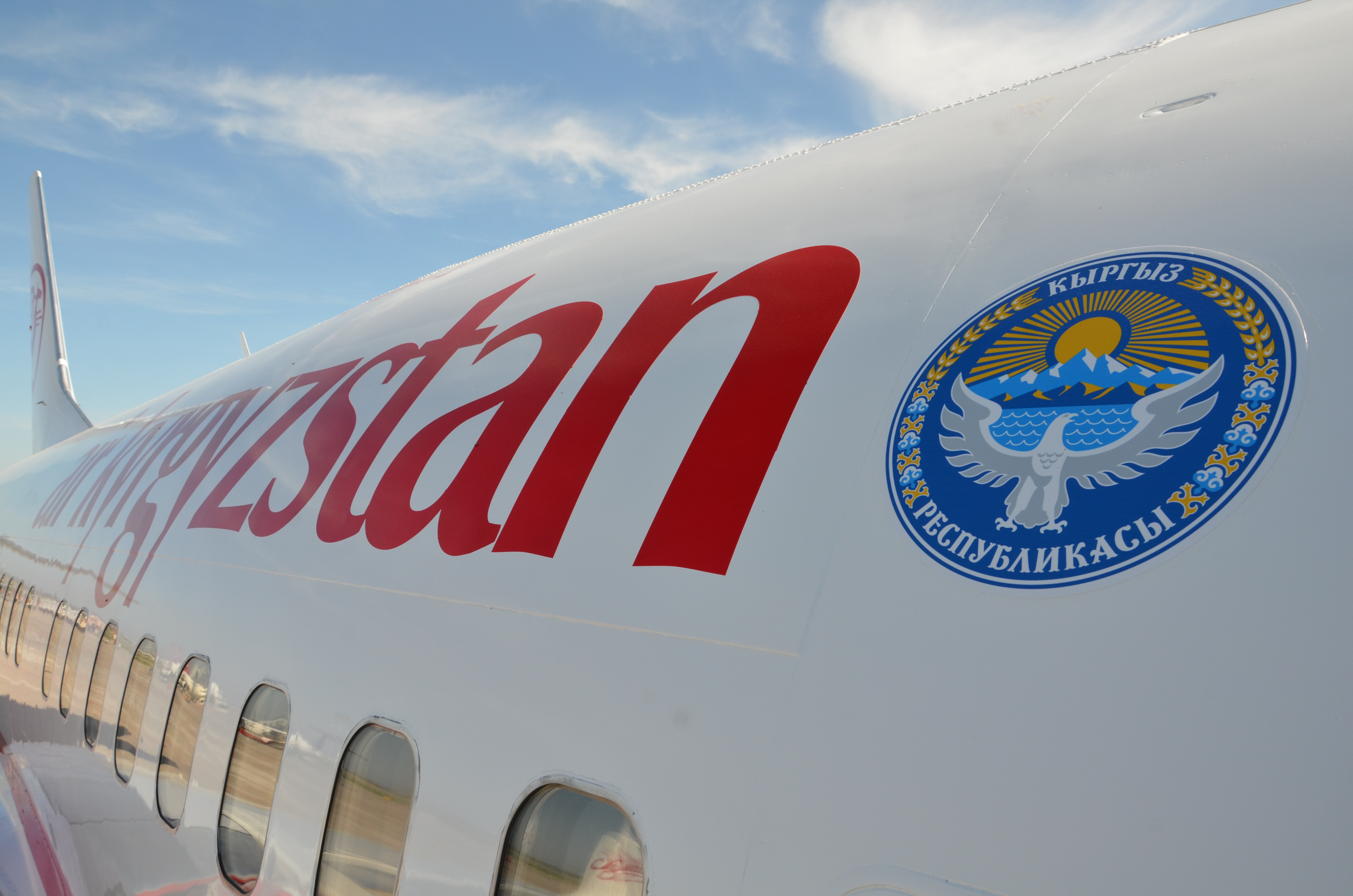

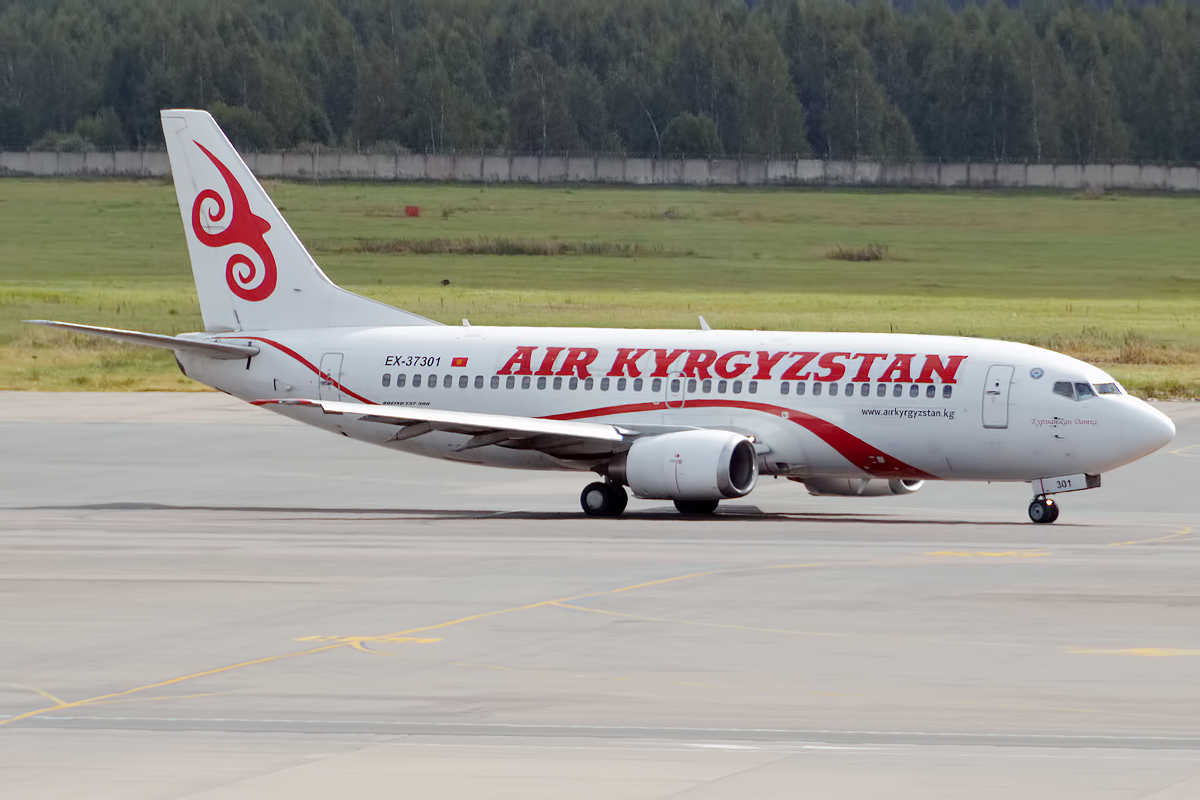
Boeing 737-300 (EX-37301) in current livery of Air Kyrgyzstan, 2015

The airline was founded in April 2001 as Altyn Air. It was rebranded as Kyrgyzstan Air Company on 28 July 2006, after taking over former national carrier Kyrgyzstan Airlines. On December 5, 2013, the airline was re-registered as ”Air Kyrgyzstan” Open Joint Stock Company.

On 26 October 2017, the airline suspended all operations after its sole aircraft, a Boeing 737-500 registered as EX-37501, was put into storage after a birdstrike accident. Following the incident, the airline's CEO Zholdoshbek Bekturganov said that the airline was looking to resume operations in December 2017 after repairing the aircraft. The airline ceased operations on 29 September 2018 after its Air Operator's Certificate (AOC) was revoked by the Kyrgyz government.

== Destinations ==
Air Kyrgyzstan OJSC had 60 frequencies and licenses in the following areas:

No.	Route	Frequencies
1.	Bishkek-Saint Petersburg	2
2.	Bishkek-Yekaterinburg	1
3.	Bishkek-Krasnoyarsk	2
4.	Bishkek-Surgut	2
5.	Bishkek-Krasnodar	2
6.	Bishkek-Belgorod	2
7.	Bishkek-Minvody	2
8.	Bishkek-Chelyabinsk	2
9.	Bishkek-Irkutsk	3
10.	Bishkek-Abakan	2
11.	Osh-Moscow	5
12.	Osh-Novosibirsk	2
13.	Osh-Yekaterinburg	2
14.	Osh-Krasnoyarsk	1
15.	Osh-Surgut	2
16.	Osh-Krasnodar	2
17.	Osh-Tyumen	2
18.	Osh-Abakan	3
19.	Bishkek-Dushanbe	1
20.	Bishkek-Kurgan-Tyube	2
21.	Bishkek-Khujant	1
22.	Osh-Dushanbe	2
23.	Osh-Kurgan-Tyube	2
24.	Bishkek-Istanbul	3
25.	Bishkek-Dubai	2
26.	Bishkek-Sharjah	2
27.	Bishkek-Ürümqi	2
	Total	60

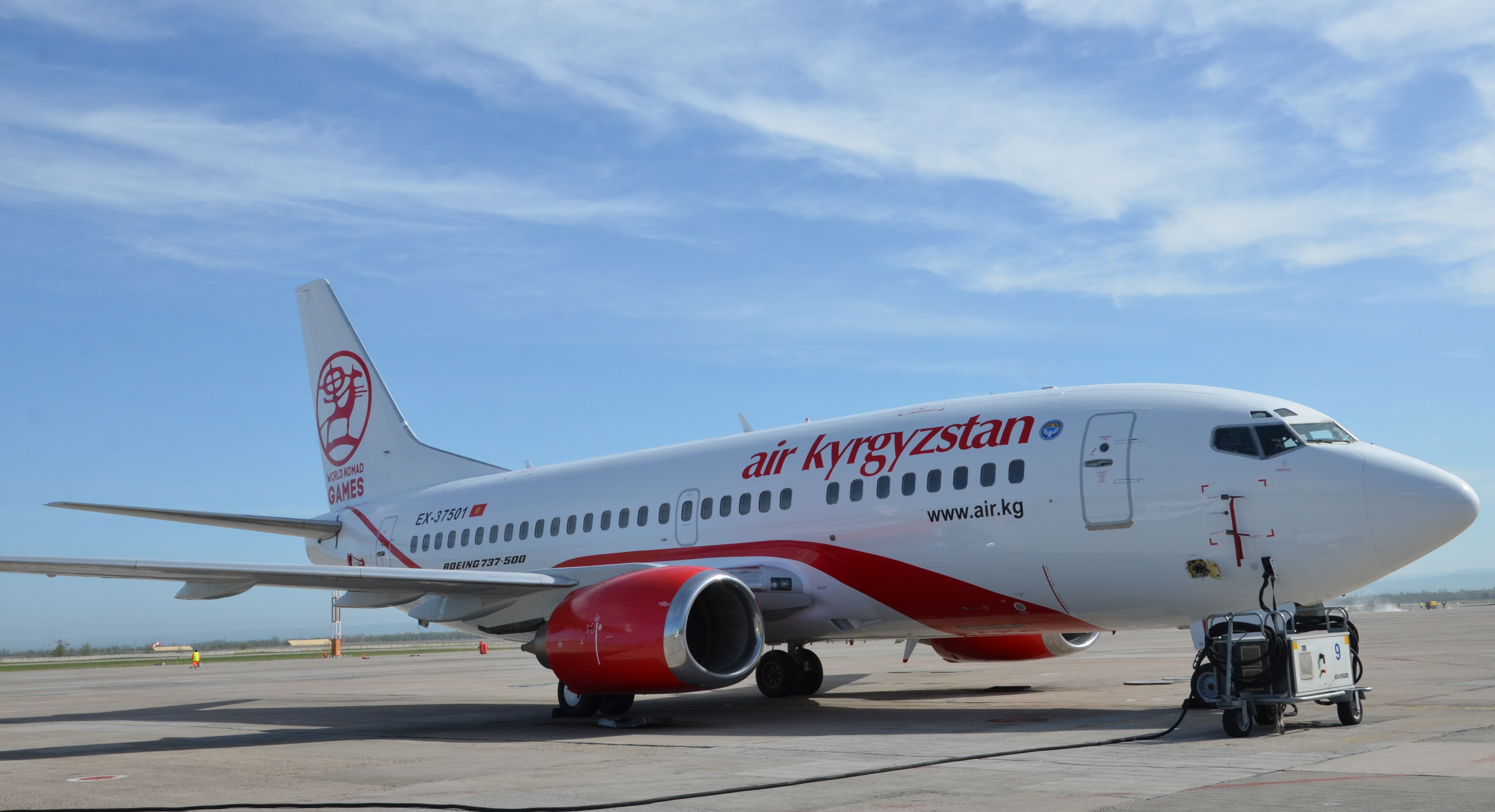
In 2011, the entire fleet of Soviet-made aircraft was disabled and Boeing 737-400 and 737-500 aircraft were purchased to replace them for regular flights.

Country	City	Airport	Notes	Ref
Kyrgyzstan	Bishkek	Manas International Airport		
Kyrgyzstan	Osh	Osh Airport	Hub	
Russia	Abakan	Abakan International Airport		

== Codeshare agreements ==
Air Kyrgyzstan had codeshare agreements with the following airlines at April 2014:

- Turkish Airlines (Star Alliance)

== Fleet ==
=== Current fleet ===
The Air Kyrgyzstan fleet consisted of the following aircraft:

- 1 Boeing 737-300
- 1 Boeing 737-500
- 1 Boeing 757-300
- Antonov An-24
- Tupolev Tu-134
- Tupolev Tu-154
- 1 Tupolev Tu-154M
- Yakovlev Yak-40
- 1 Airbus A320

== Accidents ==
On December 28, 2011, Air Kyrgyzstan Tupolev Tu-134, registration EX-020, operating flight QH3 from Bishkek to Osh, Kyrgyzstan, with 73 passengers and 6 crew suffered a hard landing on Osh's runway 12 resulting in the collapse of the right main gear, right wing separation and the aircraft rolling on its back in fog and low visibility. The aircraft came to a stop on soft ground about 10 meters off the right runway edge. A fuel leak from the left wing led to a fire erupting which was quickly extinguished by airport emergency services. One passenger received serious injuries and 24 people received minor injuries (concussions, bruises), of which 16 were taken to local hospitals.
