= Knighthawk Air Express =

Canadian cargo airline

IATA	ICAO	Call sign
4I	KNX	KNIGHT FLIGHT
- Founded: 1993
- Ceased operations: 2005
- Fleet size: 5
- Parent company: Knighthawk Inc.

Knighthawk Air Express Ltd. was a cargo airline based in Canada, which operated primarily within Canada, from hubs located in Calgary, the westernmost base, Ottawa, and Montreal. It operated cargo services on behalf of express package services including Purolator, Airborne Express and FedEx.

== History ==
The airline was established in December 1993. In October 2003, it filed for bankruptcy. In June 2004, Knighthawk Air restarted operations.

On May 16, 2005, Knighthawk Air Express received a cancellation notice for both of its routes effective from May 28, 2005. The airline immediately took steps to reduce operating costs and distribute assets.

== Accidents and incidents ==
- 30 December 1998 – Knighthawk Air Express Dassault Falcon 20D C-GTAK, on a cargo flight from Gander, was on approach to St John's when it encountered severe turbulence and wind shear, resulting in loss of altitude and impact with trees. The aircraft was able to land at the airport but sustained substantial damage to the left wing. There were no injuries to the two-person crew.

== Fleet ==
The Knighthawk Air Express fleet consisted of the following aircraft:

- 4 Dassault Falcon 20
- 1 Beechcraft 1900
- 1 Beechcraft Model 99
