= Kazaviaspas =

Airline of Kazakhstan

IATA	ICAO	Call sign
—	KZS	SPAKAZ
- Founded: 2003; 23 years ago
- Hubs: Astana International Airport
- Fleet size: 27
- Headquarters: Astana
- Website: kazaviaspas.kz

Kazaviaspas (Kazakh: Қазавиақұтқару / Qazaviaqūtqaru) is an airline based in Astana, Kazakhstan. It acts as the aviation element of the Emergency Committee of the Ministry of Internal Affairs of the Republic of Kazakhstan.

== Fleet ==
The Kazaviaspas fleet consists of the following aircraft (as of October 2018):

Kazaviaspas fleet
Aircraft	In service	Orders	Passengers	Notes
Ilyushin Il-76TD	1	—		As of August 2019.
Tupolev Tu-134A3	1	—		As of August 2019.
Tupolev Tu-154M	1	—		As of August 2019.
Eurocopter EC-145	18	—		
KA-32A11BC	2	—		
MI-26T	2	—		
MI-8T, MI-8MTV, MI-171	5	—		
Total	27			

Uses the following own helicopters: Mi-26, Ka-32, EC145, Mi8, Mi-171.

== Accidents and incidents ==
On February 23, 2023, a Kazaviaspas Mi-8AMT helicopter crashed near the village of Chaperino, Bayterek District, in the West Kazakhstan Region of Kazakhstan. Four of the six occupants died.
