= Tupolev Tu-134 =

Soviet short-range airliner

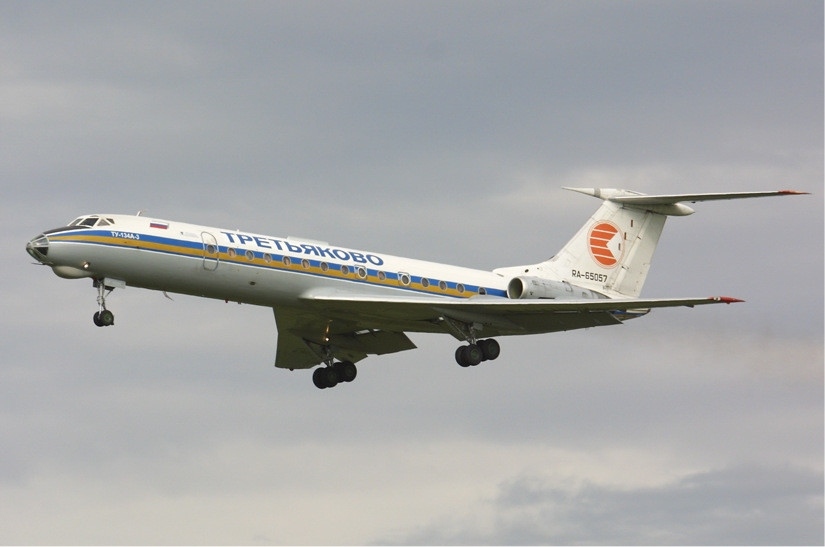
- A Tretyakovo Air Transport Tu-134 at Domodedovo International Airport

General information
- Type: Airliner
- National origin: Soviet Union
- Designer: Tupolev
- Built by: Kharkiv State Aircraft Manufacturing Company
- Status: In limited use
- Primary users: Aeroflot (historical) Soviet Air Force (historical); Russian Air Force; Air Koryo
- Number built: 854 (852 + 2 prototypes)

History
- Manufactured: 1966–1989
- Introduction date: 9 September 1967
- First flight: 29 July 1963
- Developed from: Tupolev Tu-124

The Tupolev Tu-134 (NATO reporting name: Crusty) is a twin-engined, narrow-body jet airliner built in the Soviet Union for short and medium-haul routes from 1966 to 1989. The original version featured a glazed-nose design and, like certain other Russian airliners (including the Tu-154), it can operate from unpaved airfields.

One of the most widely used aircraft in former Comecon countries, the number in active service is decreasing because of operational safety concerns and noise restrictions. The model has seen long-term service with some 42 countries, with some European airlines having scheduled as many as 12 daily takeoffs and landings per plane. In addition to regular passenger service, it has also been used in various air force, army and navy support roles; for pilot and navigator training; and for aviation research and test projects. In recent years, a number of Tu-134s have been converted for use as VIP transports and business jets. A total of 854 Tu-134s were built of all versions (including test bed examples) with Aeroflot as the largest user by 1995, the Tu-134 had carried 360 million passengers for that airline.

== Design and development ==
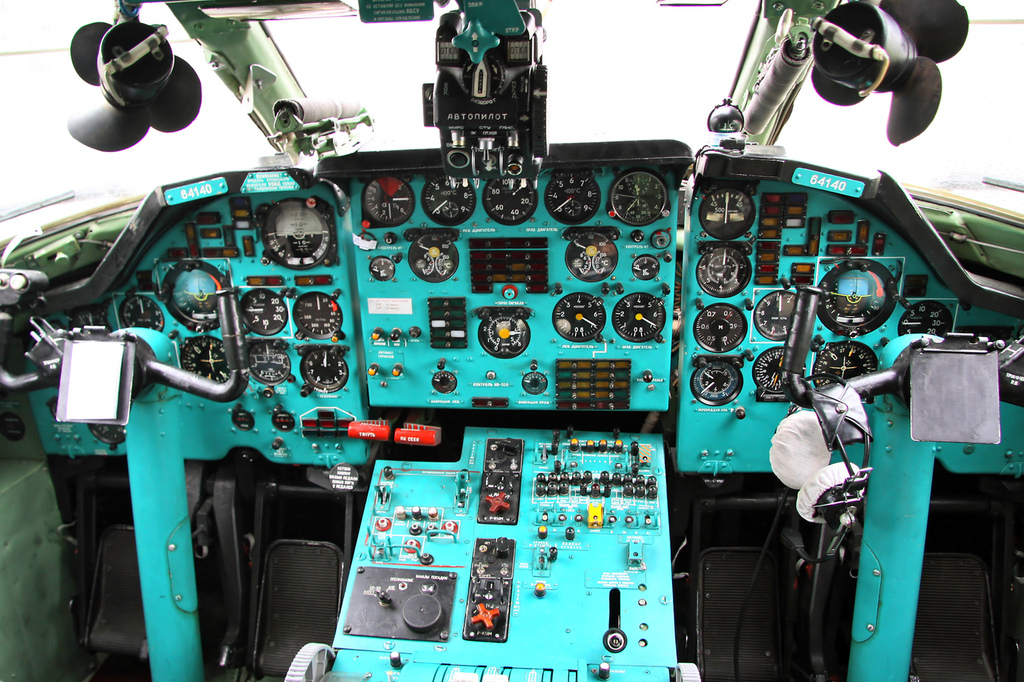
Tu-134UBL cockpit

Following the introduction of engines mounted on pylons on the rear fuselage by the French Sud Aviation Caravelle, airliner manufacturers around the world rushed to adopt the new layout. Its advantages included clean wing airflow without disruption by nacelles or pylons and decreased cabin noise. At the same time, placing heavy engines that far back created challenges with the location of the centre of gravity in relation to the centre of lift, which was at the wings. To make room for the engines, the tailplanes had to be relocated to the tail fin, which had to be stronger and therefore heavier, further compounding the tail-heavy arrangement.

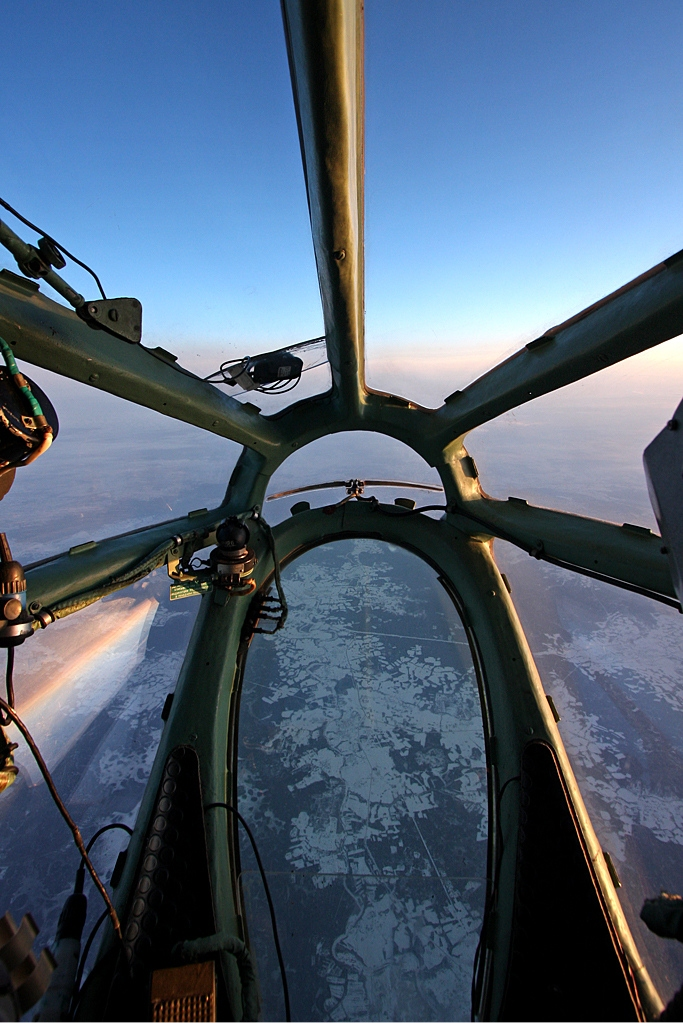
Looking through the nose of an Aeroflot-Nord Tu-134 (2009)

== Operational history ==
In September 1967, the Tu-134 made its first scheduled flight from Moscow to Adler. The Tu-134 was the first Soviet airliner to receive international certification from the International Civil Aviation Organization, which permitted it to be used on international routes. Due to this certification, Aeroflot used most of its Tu-134s on international routes. In 1968, the first export customers, Interflug of East Germany, LOT Polish Airlines and Malév Hungarian Airlines purchased the Tu-134. In 1969, the Tu-134 was displayed at the Paris Air Show.

From 1972, Aeroflot began placing the Tu-134 in domestic service to Baku, Yerevan, Kyiv, Kishinev, Krasnodar, Leningrad, Omsk, Riga, and Sochi from Sheremetyevo International Airport in Moscow.

In its early years, the Tu-134 developed a reputation for reliability and efficiency, especially when compared with previous Soviet designs. After the establishment of tougher noise standards in the ICAO regulations in 2002, the Tu-134 was banned from most western European airports for its high noise levels. In early 2006, 245 Tu-134s were still in operation, 162 of which were in Russia. After a fatal accident in March 2007, and at the instigation of Russian Minister of Transportation Igor Levitin, Aeroflot announced that it would be retiring its fleet, and the last Tu-134 was removed from service on 1 January 2008. Some were still in operations with Aeroflot subsidiaries on local routes within Russia. The Tu-134 also found a new life as a business jet with many having an expensive business interior installed. High fuel and maintenance costs are increasingly limiting the number used today.

In June 2011, as a response to RusAir Flight 9605 which resulted in 47 fatalities, Russian president Dmitry Medvedev ordered preparations for taking the Tu-134 out of use by 2012.

On 22 May 2019, the final passenger flight of the Tu-134 in Russia took place.

Many Tu-134s have been preserved as memorials at airports throughout the former Soviet Union. A former Malév Tu-134A (registration HA-LBE) is on display at the Aeropark at Budapest Ferenc Liszt International Airport in Hungary.

== Variants ==
Tu-124A
The prototype Tu-134 (CCCP-45075) retained this slightly confusing designation. All subsequent aircraft are identified as Tu-134.
Tu-134
The glass-nosed version. The first series could seat up to 64 passengers, and this was later increased to 72 passengers.

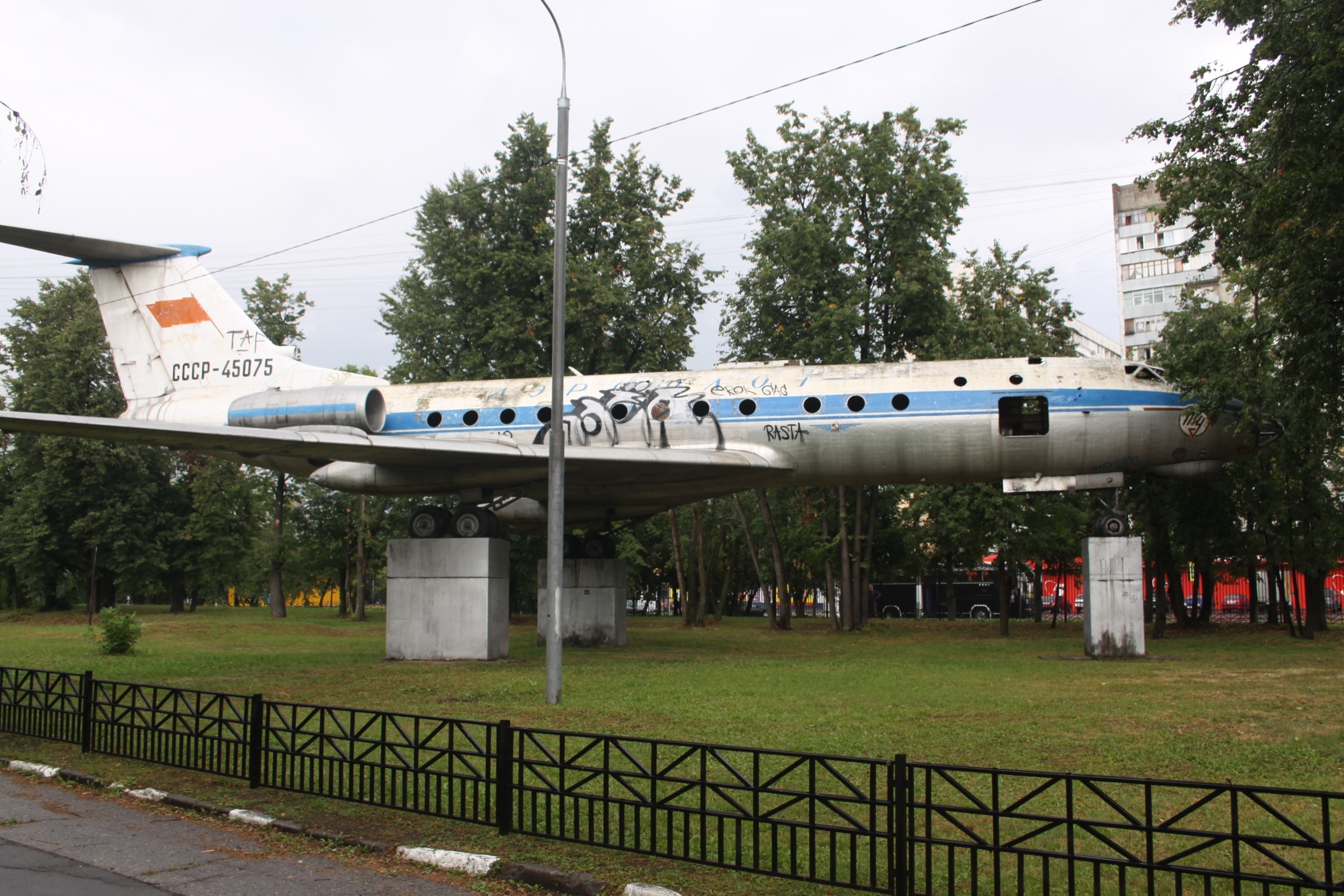
CCCP-45075 Tupolev Tu-124A (Tu-134 Prototype) – badly preserved at Moscow-Novogireyevo

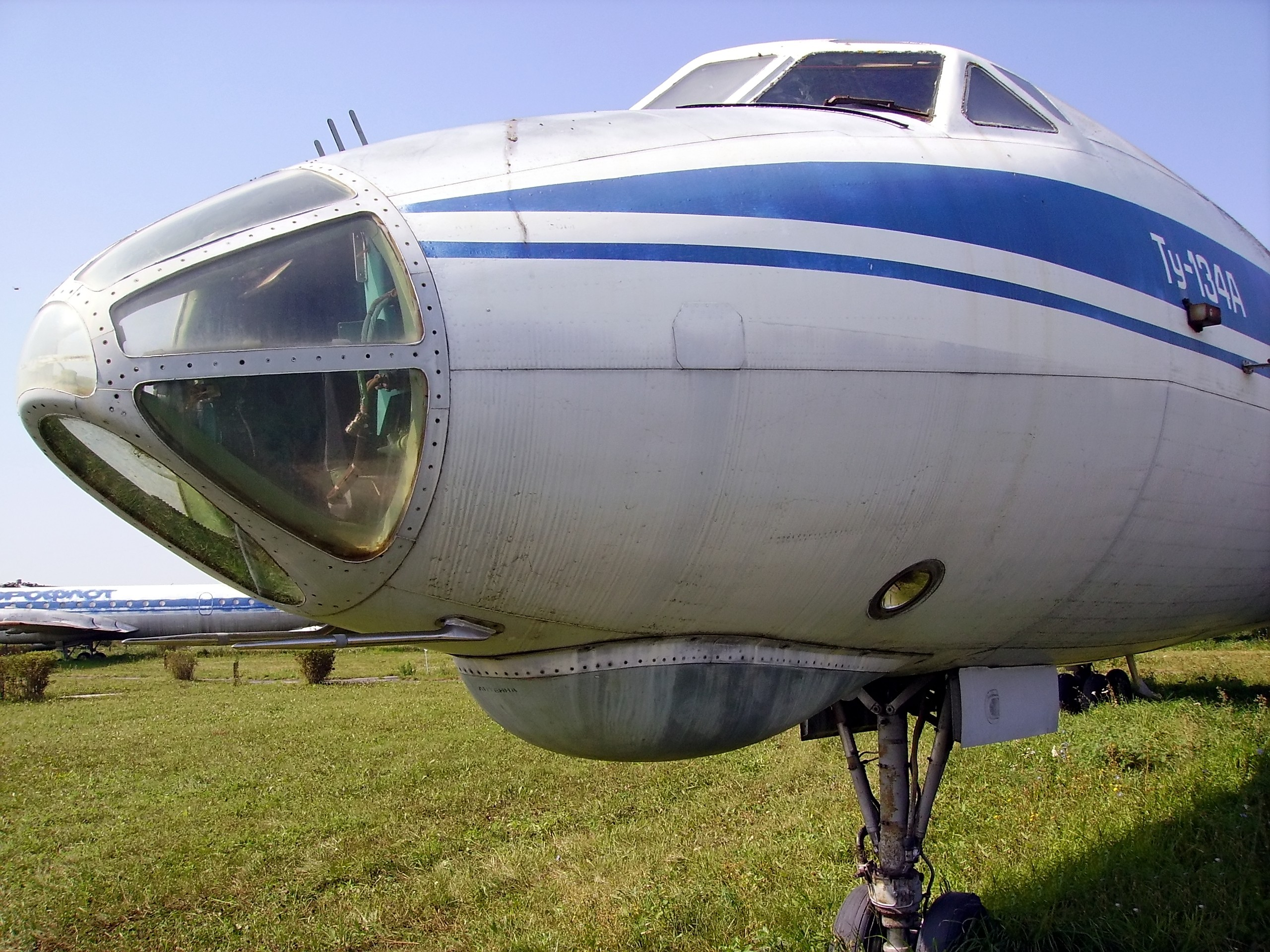
Tupolev Tu-134A with its radar and glass nose

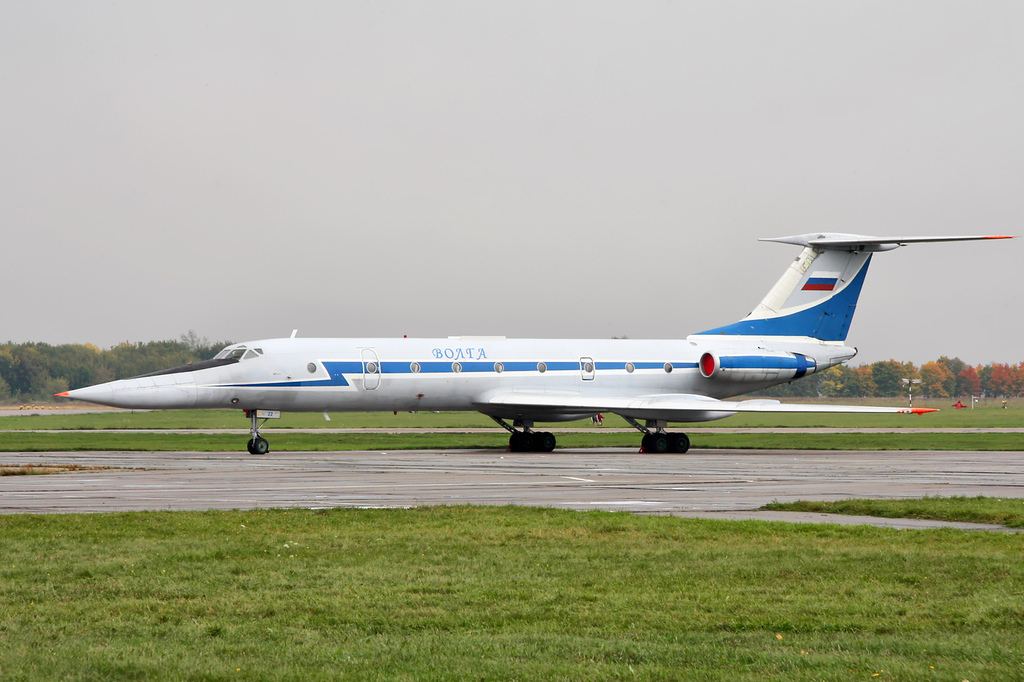
Tu-134UBL "Volga" from 1449th Airbase in Tambov city

Tu-134A
Second series, with upgraded engines, improved avionics, seating up to 84 passengers. All Tu-134A variants have been built with the distinctive glass nose and chin radar dome, but some were modified to the B standard with the radar moved to the nose radome.
Tu-134A-2
Projected upgrade of the Tu-134A with D-30M engines and a 0.75 m (2.5 ft) fuselage stretch.
Tu-134A-3
Second series, powered by two updated Soloviev D-30 turbofan engines.
Tu-134A-5
Most recent version.
Tu-134AK
Operated by the Russian Air Force and Roscosmos.
Tu-134B
Second series, 80 seats, radar moved to the nose radome, eliminating the glazed nose. Some Tu-134B models have long-range fuel tanks fitted under the fuselage; these are visible as a sizable bulge.
Tu-134B-2, Tu-1324B-2-3
Projected 100-seat version of Tu-134B with D-30 Series 2 or Series 3 engines.
Tu-134B-3
Version of Tu-134B with D-30 Series 3 engines.
Tu-134BV
Space shuttle work model.
Tu-134D
Projected redesign of the Tu-134A with a new elliptical section fuselage, revised wings, a more powerful APU and other improvements. Development work took place from 1973 to 1976, but was cancelled in favor of the Yakovlev Yak-42.
Tu-134G
Projected 86-seat version of the Tu-134V.
Tu-134LK
Cosmonaut training version.

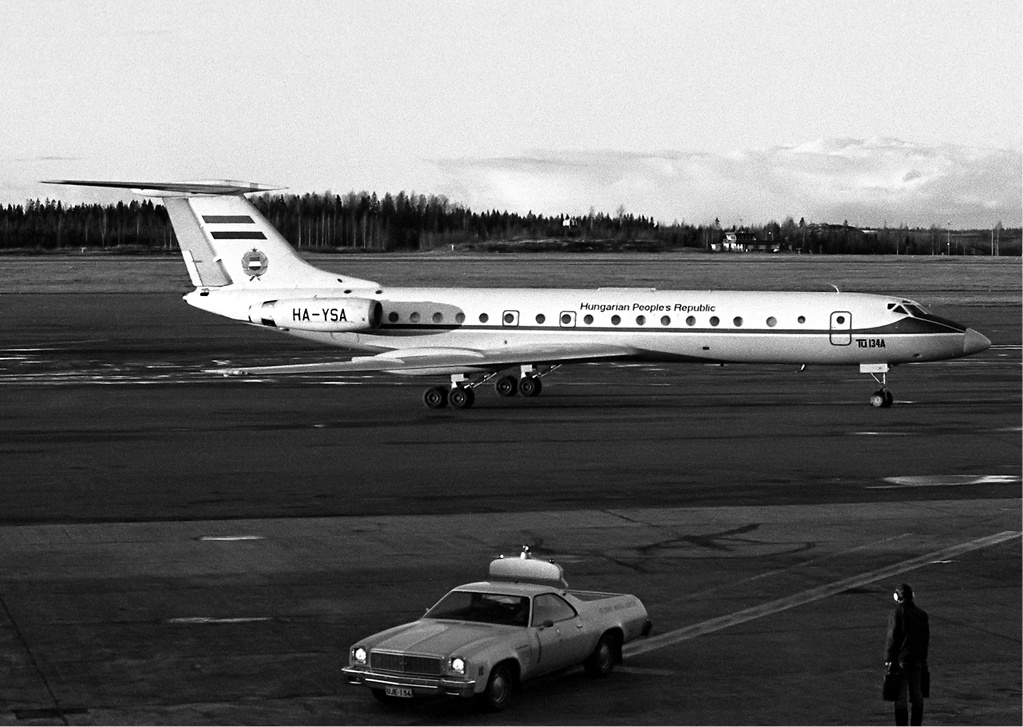
Tu-134A of the Hungarian People's Republic at Helsinki Vantaa Airport in 1978.

Tu-134M
Projected modernized version of Tu-134B, powered by Progress D-436T1-134 engines.
Tu-134S (Tu-134C)
Projected convertible/cargo version based on Tu-134A.
Tu-134UBL
Tu-160 crew training version, with Tu-160 nose cone.
Tu-134UBK
Naval version of Tu-134UBL. Only one was ever built.
Tu-134BSh
Tu-22M crew trainer, fitted with a Tu-22M radar in the nose.
Tu-134Sh-1
Crew trainer with bomb racks for heavy bomber crews
Tu-134Sh-2
navigator trainer for tactical bomber crews
Tu-134SKh
Crop survey version.
Tu-134V
Projected upgrade of the Tu-134A with D-30M engines, radar in the nose and a three-man flight crew.

== Current operators ==
As of 2024, only a few Tupolev Tu-134s remain in civil passenger airline service worldwide:

Syria

- Syrian Air Force

Ukraine

- Ukrainian Air Force - 15th Transport Aviation Brigade "Aircraft Designer Oleg Antonov" located at Boryspil International Airport
- Ukrainian Air Guard - 2 aircraft in service

Russia

- Federal Space Agency of the Russian Federation
- Russian Air Force

North Korea

- Air Koryo operates 2 aircraft. They are the last commercial airline to operate the Tupolev 134.

== Former operators ==
The following airlines, states and other entities at one point operated at least one Tu-134 aircraft:

=== Former civil operators ===
Soviet Union/Russia

- Aeroflot
- Polet Flight
- Yamal Airlines

Afghanistan

- Ariana Afghan Airlines

Albania

- Albanian Airlines
- Albtransport Airlines

Azerbaijan

- Azerbaijan Airlines

Bulgaria

- Balkan Bulgarian Airlines

Czechoslovakia

- CSA Czech Airlines

Estonia

- Estonian Air
- ELK Airways

Georgia

- Georgian International Airlines
- Transair Georgia

Hungary

- Malév Hungarian Airlines

Kazakhstan

- Air Kazakhstan
- Atyrau Airways
- Berkut Air
- Euro-Asia Air
- Kazair West
- Kazaviaspas

Kyrgyzstan

- Kyrgyzstan Air Company – 1 crashed on 28 December 2011
- Kyrgyzstan Airlines

Latvia

- Latavio

Lithuania

- Air Lithuania
- Lithuanian Airlines

Moldova

- Air Moldova

Peru

- Imperial Air

Poland

- LOT Polish Airlines

East Germany

- Interflug

Russia

- Aero Rent
- Aeroflot-Plus
- Alrosa-Avia
- BAL Bashkirian Airlines
- Center-South
- Izhavia
- Rossiya Airlines (government fleet)
- Samara Airlines
- Kosmos Airlines (3)
- Meridian Airlines (1)
- Sirius-Aero
- Turukhan Airlines
- UTair Express

Syria

- Syrianair

Romania

- None ever acquired

Ukraine

- Ukraine Air Enterprise

Vietnam

- Vietnam Airlines

Yugoslavia/Serbia

- Aviogenex

=== Former military operators ===
Angola
People's Air and Air Defence Force of Angola
Armenia
Armenian Air Force – 1 stored
Belarus
Belarus Air Force
Bulgaria
Bulgarian Air Force
Czech Republic
Czech Air Force
Czechoslovakia
Czechoslovak Air Force – Passed on to successor states
Germany
German Air Force – former operator, taken over from East German Air Force after German reunification
Georgia
Georgian Air Force
East Germany
East German Air Force
Moldova
Moldovan Air Force
North Korea
North Korean Air Force
Poland
Polish Air Force. Operated 2 from 1972 to 1977 (later LOT) and 2 from 1977 to 1992. Retired, replaced by 2 Tupolev Tu-154M.
Soviet Union

- Soviet Air Force
- Soviet Naval Aviation. Passed on successor states.
- Soviet Space Agency
- Soviet Internal Troops – Prisoner Transport Service

Syria

- Syrianair (1)

== Aircraft on display ==
=== Belarus ===
- Tu-134A, registration CCCP-65036 (cn 61033), is permanently preserved and displayed in a retro Aeroflot livery as a gate guard monument at the entrance of Minsk National Airport. The aircraft was previously operated by Aeroflot as CCCP-65149 and later by Belavia under the registration EW-65149, before being restored to its current display identity.

=== Bulgaria ===
- Tu-134A, registration LZ-TUT, formerly operated by Balkan Bulgarian Airlines, is preserved and on display at the Aviomuseum Burgas next to Burgas Airport.

=== Czech Republic ===
- Tu-134A, registration OK-HFC, formerly operated by ČSA Czechoslovak Airlines, is preserved at the Aerospace Research and Test Establishment (VZLÚ) in Prague-Letňany.

=== Estonia ===
- Tu-134A-3, registration ES-LTA, formerly operated by ELK Airways, is preserved and on display at the Estonian Aviation Museum near Tartu.

=== Germany ===
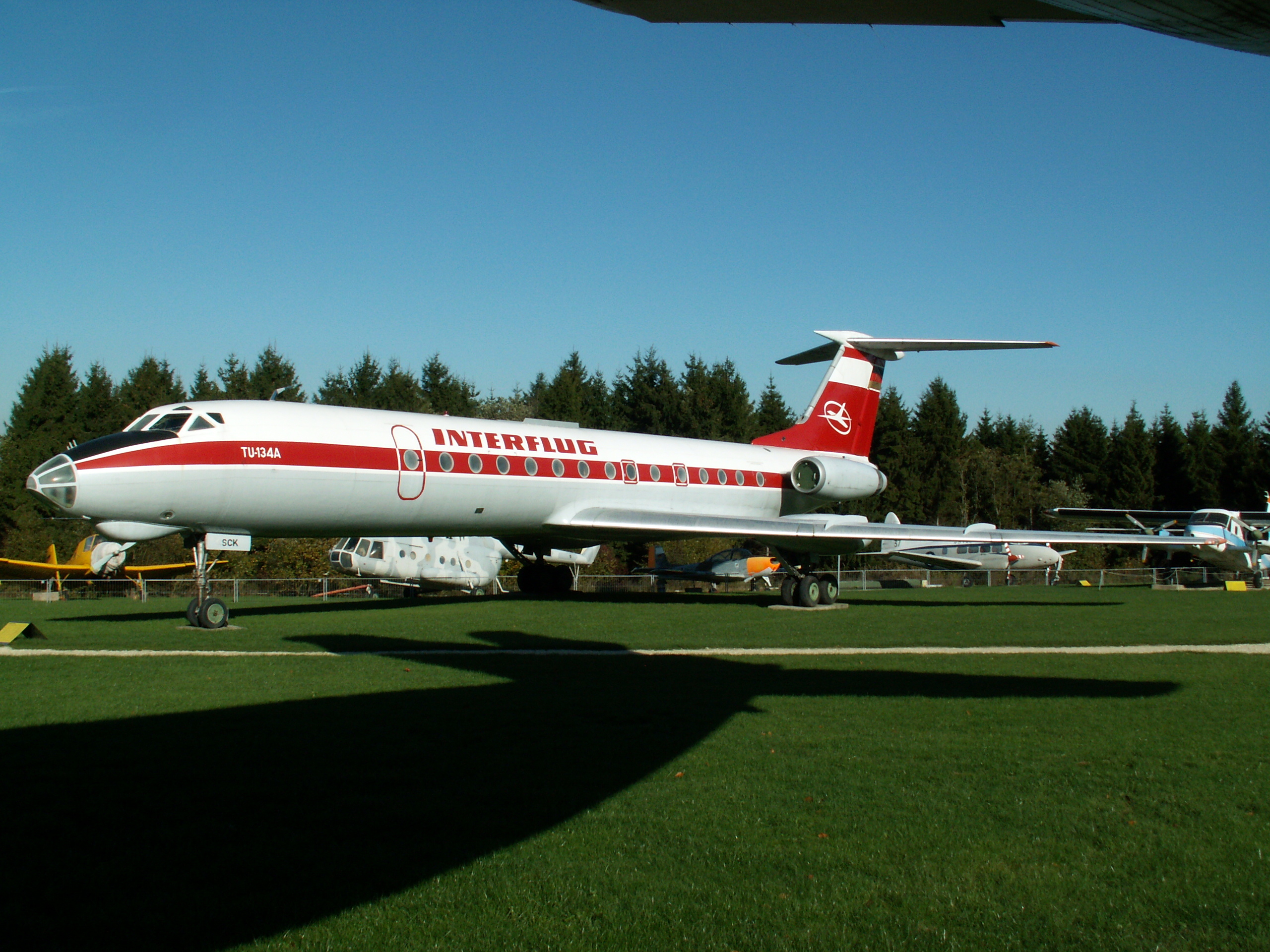
DDR-SCK, formerly operated by Interflug, is preserved and displayed at the Flugausstellung Hermeskeil.

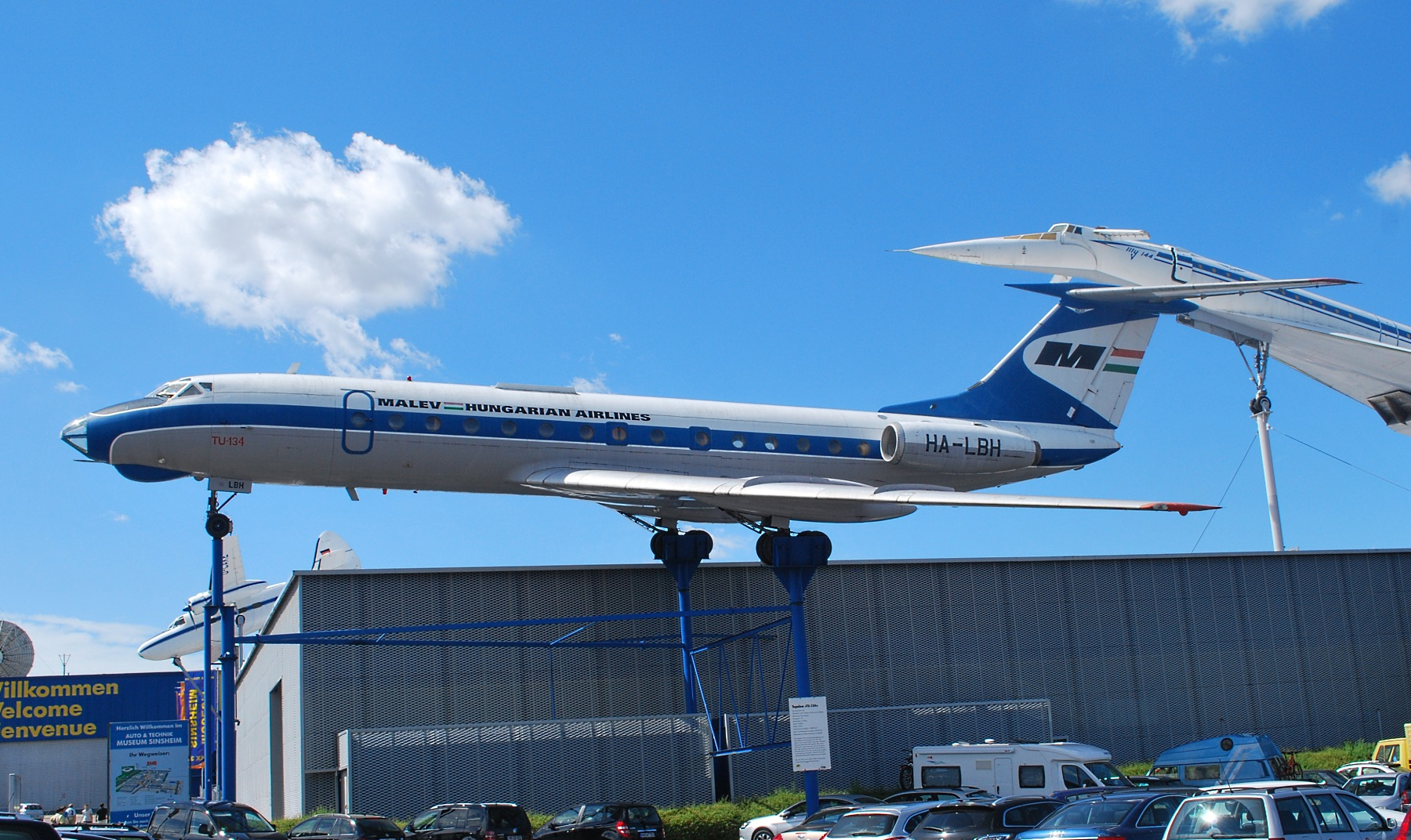
HA-LBH, formerly operated by Malév Hungarian Airlines, is preserved and displayed mounted on pedestals at the Technik Museum Sinsheim.

- Tu-134A, registration CCCP-65745, formerly operated by Aeroflot, was used by the GDR Ministry for State Security for anti-terrorist training, and is now preserved at the Flugplatzmuseum Cottbus.
- Tu-134A, registration DDR-SCK, formerly operated by Interflug, is preserved and displayed at the Flugausstellung Hermeskeil.
- Tu-134A, registration DDR-SCL, formerly operated by Interflug, is preserved and displayed at the headquarters of HYDRO Systems KG in Biberach an der Riß.
- Tu-134, registration DDR-SCH, formerly operated by Interflug, is preserved at the Aviation Museum Finowfurt (Luftfahrtmuseum Finowfurt).
- Tu-134, registration HA-LBH, formerly operated by Malév Hungarian Airlines, is preserved and displayed mounted on pedestals at the Technik Museum Sinsheim.

=== Hungary ===
- Tu-134, registration HA-LBE, formerly operated by Malév Hungarian Airlines, is preserved and fully restored at the Aeropark aviation museum next to Budapest Ferenc Liszt International Airport.

=== Moldova ===
- Tu-134A-3, registration CCCP-65036 (later ER-65036, c/n 48700), formerly operated by Aeroflot and Air Moldova, is preserved as a monument to Moldovan civil aviation personnel outside Chișinău International Airport.

=== Poland ===
- Tu-134A, registration SP-LHC, in the historical livery of LOT Polish Airlines, is preserved as a permanent exhibit at the Polish Aviation Museum in Kraków.
- Tu-134A, registration DDR-SCZ, formerly operated by Interflug, was relocated from its previous display site in Merseburg to a new museum location in Kruszyn.

=== Russia ===
- Tu-134Sh, registration 76 Blue, a navigation trainer variant formerly operated by the Russian Air Force, is preserved and on display at the Long Range Aviation Museum within Engels Air Base.
- Tu-124A (prototype), registration CCCP-45075, the initial prototype of the Tu-134 series, is preserved as a monument at Moscow-Novogireyevo.
- Tu-134A-3, registration RA-65132, is mounted on a pedestal as an airport monument outside Roshchino International Airport in Tyumen.
- Tu-134B-3, registration RA-65693, is preserved and displayed at the Ulyanovsk Aircraft Museum.
- Tu-134, registration CCCP-65609, is preserved as an exhibit at the Central Air Force Museum in Monino.
- Tu-134UBL, registration RF-12037, a dedicated military trainer variant nicknamed the "Black Pearl", is preserved at the Tambov Long Range Aviation Museum.

=== Ukraine ===
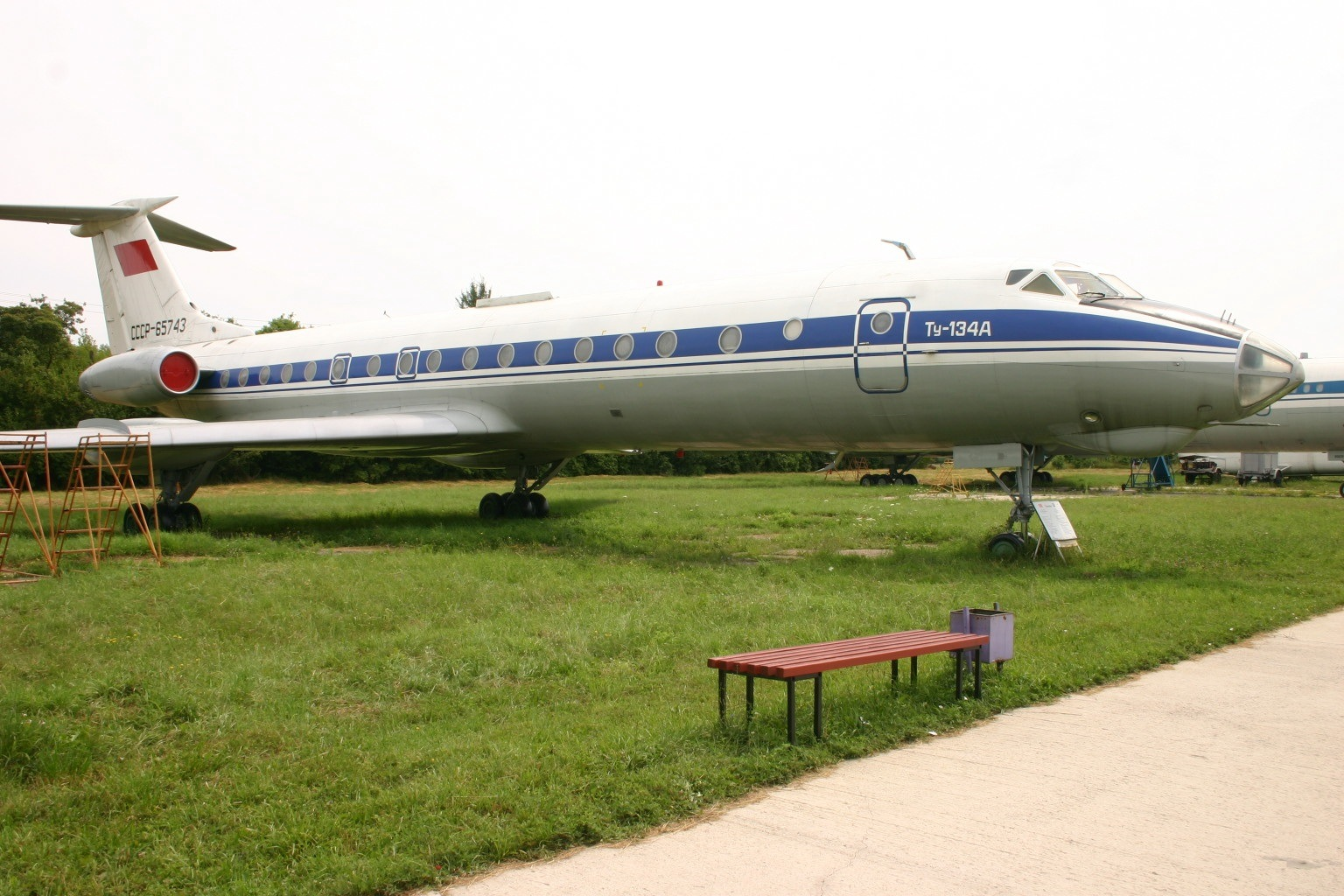
CCCP-65743, formerly operated by Aeroflot is preserved at the Ukraine State Aviation Museum at Kyiv International Airport.

- Tu-134, registration CCCP-65601, is preserved on display at the Ukraine State Aviation Museum in Kyiv.
- Tu-134A, registration CCCP-65743, formerly operated by Aeroflot, is preserved at the Ukraine State Aviation Museum at Kyiv International Airport.
- Tu-134UBL, registration Blue 43, a military trainer variant featuring the distinct Tu-22M bomber radar/nose configuration, is preserved at the Ukraine State Aviation Museum in Kyiv.

== Specifications (Tu-134A) ==
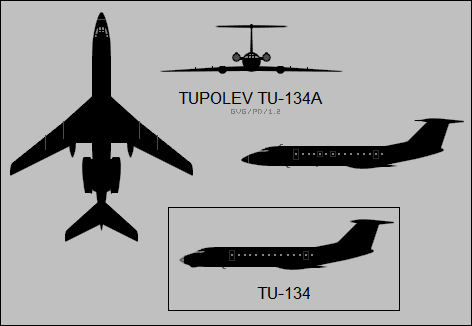

Data from OKB Tupolev, OAO Tupolev

General characteristics

- Crew: 3–5 flight crew + 3–4 flight attendants
- Capacity: 72–84 passengers / 8,200 kg (18,078 lb)
- Length: 37.1 m (121 ft 9 in)
- Wingspan: 29.01 m (95 ft 2 in)
- Diameter: 2.9 m (9 ft 6 in) fuselage diameter
- Height: 9.02 m (29 ft 7 in)
- Wing area: 127.3 m^{2} (1,370 sq ft)
- Airfoil: root: PR-1-10S-9 (15.7%); tip: PR-1-10S-9 (12%)
- Empty weight: 27,960 kg (61,641 lb)
- Gross weight: 47,000 kg (103,617 lb)
- Max takeoff weight: 47,600 kg (104,940 lb)
- Fuel capacity: 13,200 L (3,500 US gal; 2,900 imp gal)
- Powerplant: 2 × Soloviev D-30-II turbofan engines, 66.68 kN (14,990 lbf) thrust each

Performance

- Maximum speed: 950 km/h (590 mph, 510 kn)
- Cruise speed: 850 km/h (530 mph, 460 kn)
- Range: 1,900–3,000 km (1,200–1,900 mi, 1,000–1,600 nmi)
- Ferry range: 3,200 km (2,000 mi, 1,700 nmi)
- Service ceiling: 12,100 m (39,700 ft)

== See also ==
Aircraft of comparable role, configuration, and era

- BAC One-Eleven
- Fokker F28 Fellowship
- Fokker 100
- McDonnell Douglas DC-9

Related lists

- List of civil aircraft
- List of jet airliners

== Sources ==
- Fontanellaz, Adrien; Cooper, Tom; Matos, Jose Augusto (2020). War of Intervention in Angola, Volume 3: Angolan and Cuban Air Forces, 1975-1985. Warwick, UK: Helion & Company Publishing. ISBN 978-1-913118-61-7.
- Healey, John K. (January–February 2004). "Retired Warriors: 'Cold War' Bomber Legacy". Air Enthusiast. No. 109. pp. 75–79. ISSN 0143-5450.
- Kingsley-Jones, Max (27 August – 2 September 2002). "World airliner census: Running to Stand Still". Flight International. Vol. 162, no. 4846. pp. 30–55. ISSN 0015-3710.
