= 1975 in aviation =

This is a list of aviation-related events from 1975.

== Events ==
=== January ===
- A specially modified McDonnell Douglas F-15 Eagle sets eight time to climb records, including one of 3 minutes 27 seconds from standstill on the runway to a height of 30,000 metres (98,000 feet).
- January 3 – A lone hijacker boards a National Airlines Boeing 727 parked at Pensacola Regional Airport in Pensacola, Florida. Only a small crew of cleaners is aboard the airliner, and they overpower the hijacker.
- January 6 – An Argentine Army de Havilland Canada DHC-6 Twin Otter 200 (registration AE-259) on a reconnaissance flight in poor weather crashes into the side of the mountain Nuñorco Chico in Argentina's Sierra del Aconquija at an altitude of 2,000 meters (6,600 feet), killing all 12 people on board.
- January 7 – A male passenger hijacks a British Airways BAC One-Eleven shortly after it lands at London′s Heathrow Airport after a domestic flight from Manchester, England. He initially demands a ransom of US$230,000 and a parachute, then changes hs mind and instead demands to be flown to Paris, where he says he will surrender 48 hours after arriving, giving him time to fulfill a purpose he does not reveal. The flight crew tricks him into letting them fly him to London Stansted Airport, and he is arrested there.
- January 8 – A SATENA Douglas C-47 Skytrain (registration FAC-688) crashes into a hill near El Doncello, Colombia, killing all 23 people on board.
- January 9
  - British Airways begins Europe′s first no-booking shuttle service, between London, England, and Glasgow, Scotland.
  - Golden West Airlines Flight 261, a de Havilland DHC-6 Twin Otter, collides with a Cessnair Aviation, Inc., Cessna 150 over Whittier, California. Both aircraft crash, killing all 12 people aboard the Twin Otter and both people in the Cessna. There are no injuries on the ground, although the Twin Otter's fuselage crashes on the grounds of Katherine Edwards Middle School, where 300 people are watching an outdoor basketball game.
- January 13 – As Eastern Airlines Flight 140 – a Boeing 727 with 60 people on board flying from Atlanta, Georgia to Philadelphia, Pennsylvania – passes over Lynchburg, Virginia, 46-year-old Laughlin Wright begins to bang on the cockpit door, demanding to be flown to San Juan, Puerto Rico. He agrees to allow the airliner to land at Washington Dulles International Airport in Virginia. During the final descent to the airport, an off-duty Philadelphia police officer aboard as a passenger grabs Wright, shoves him into a lavatory, and holds the door closed until the plane lands and all passengers have escaped. Airport security officers then board the plane and arrest Wright.
- January 14 – The General Dynamics F-16 Fighting Falcon is announced as the winner of the LWF (Light Weight Fighter) competition.
- January 16 – United States Air Force Major D. W. Petersen sets a new world absolute time-to-height speed record, flying a McDonnell Douglas F-15A Eagle to 15,000 meters (49,000 feet) in 77.02 seconds.
- January 20 – Terrorists hijack an Air France Boeing 707 and have it flown to Baghdad, Iraq.
- January 22 – A lone hijacker commandeers a VASP Boeing 737-200 during a domestic flight in Brazil from Goiânia to Brasília, demanding ransom money and the release of prisoners. Security forces storm the airliner and arrest the hijacker.
- January 30 – While the Turkish Airlines Fokker F28-1000 Fellowship Bursa, operating as Flight 345, is on approach to Istanbul Yeşilköy Airport in Istanbul, Turkey, the runway goes dark when the airport suffers a power failure. The flight crew initiates a missed approach but crashes into the Sea of Marmara while maneuvering for a second landing attempt, killing all 42 people on board.

=== February ===
- February 1 – U.S. Air Force Major R. Smith sets a new world absolute time-to-height speed record, flying a McDonnell Douglas F-15A Eagle to 30,000 meters (98,000 feet) in 207.80 seconds.
- February 3 – An engine fire breaks out aboard a Philippine Air Lines Hawker Siddeley HS 748 (registration RP-C1028) two minutes after takeoff from Manila International Airport in Manila, the Philippines. While attempting to return to the airport it crashes in a rice field, killing all 33 people on board.
- February 8 – Hastily developed Larnaca International Airport opens just outside Larnaca, Cyprus, as Cyprus's only commercial airport; it replaces Nicosia International Airport, permanently closed and abandoned during the Turkish invasion of Cyprus in July 1974. Cyprus Airways, which had suspended flight operations in July 1974 when Nicosia International closed and all five of its aircraft were stranded there, resumes flight operations the same day. Cyprus Airways and Olympic Airways are the first airlines to serve the new airport; its runways are not yet long enough to accommodate jet aircraft, so Cyprus Airways uses Vickers Viscount 800 airliners there, while Olympic uses NAMC YS-11s.
- February 9 – A German Air Force Transall C-160D carrying 37 West German soldiers from Hohn Air Base in West Germany to a North Atlantic Treaty Organization (NATO) missile base on Crete crashes in stormy weather at an altitude of about 5,000 feet (1,500 meters) in snow-covered mountains 24 kilometers (15 miles) from Crete's Chania-Soúda Airport, killing all 42 people on board.
- February 14 – Jerry Pettis, a member of the United States House of Representatives representing California's 37th Congressional District dies when the Beechcraft Model V35B Bonanza he is piloting crashes near Cherry Valley, California, after he encounters adverse weather conditions.
- February 20 – A Cessna 182 Skylane piloted by American professional wrestler Buddy Colt and also carrying wrestlers Gary Hart, Austin Idol, and Bobby Shane, stalls while attempting a go-around in clouds and darkness at Peter O. Knight Airport in Tampa, Florida, and crashes into Tampa Bay. Colt, Idol, and Hart survive, but Shane drowns in the plane's back seat.
- February 22 – A lone hijacker commandeers a VASP Boeing 737-2A1 (registration PP-SMU) during a domestic flight in Brazil from Goiânia to Brasília, demanding ransom money. The hijacker is taken down.
- February 27 – A VASP Embraer EMB 110C Bandeirante crashes just after takeoff from São Paulo–Congonhas Airport in São Paulo, Brazil, killing all 15 people on board.

=== March ===
- March 1 – Three hijackers commandeer an Iraqi Airways Boeing 737-200 during a domestic flight in Iraq from Mosul to Baghdad. They surrender to authorities, but one person is killed during the incident.
- March 2 – A hijacker aboard Air New England Flight 911 – a de Havilland Canada DHC-6 Twin Otter bound from Hyannis to Nantucket, Massachusetts – demands to be flown to New Haven, Connecticut. Police storm the plane at Hyannis Airport and arrest the hijacker.
- March 12 – An Air Vietnam Douglas C-54D-5-DC Skymaster (registration XV-NUJ) flying from Vientiane, Laos, to Saigon, South Vietnam, crashes 25 kilometers (16 miles) southwest of Pleiku, South Vietnam, killing all 26 people on board.
- March 16 – A LADE Fokker F27 Friendship 400M (registration TC-72) crashes into the mountain Cerro López 35 kilometers (22 miles) west of San Carlos de Bariloche International Airport in San Carlos de Bariloche, Argentina, while descending for an instrument approach to the airport, killing all 52 people on board. Most of the 47 passengers are soldiers and police officers who took part in flood relief operations in Argentina's Neuquen Province.
- March 21 – Because of confusion about air traffic control instructions, a United States Air Force Lockheed C-141A-20-LM Starlifter flying from Yokota Air Base in Japan to McChord Field in Pierce County, Washington, crashes into 7,743-foot (2,360-meter) Mount Constance in Washington's Olympic National Park, striking a ridge 150 feet (46 meters) below its summit. The crash kills all 16 people on board.
- March 31 – Western Airlines Flight 470, a Boeing 737-200, overruns the runway while landing at Casper/Natrona County International Airport near Casper, Wyoming, injuring four of the 99 people on board and damaging the aircraft beyond repair.

=== April ===
- U.S. Navy Grumman F-14 Tomcat fighters fly combat missions for the first time, when F-14As of Fighter Squadrons 1 (VF-1) and 2 (VF-2) aboard the aircraft carrier USS Enterprise (CVAN-65) fly air patrols over South Vietnam during the evacuation of Saigon.
- Royal Air Maroc becomes the first Arab airline to provide service to New York City, using a Boeing 707-320B leased from Air France.
- April 1 – The Republic of Singapore Air Force is formed.
- April 4 – The cargo door of a U.S. Air Force C-5A Galaxy making the first flight of Operation Babylift opens explosively while the plane is flying over the South China Sea off Vũng Tàu, South Vietnam. The plane crashes while attempting an emergency landing at Tan Son Nhut Air Base near Saigon, South Vietnam, killing 153 of the 328 people on board. Seventy-six of the dead are South Vietnamese orphans being airlifted to join caregivers in the United States. It remains the deadliest accident involving a U.S. military aircraft.
- April 9 – A lone hijacker demands ransom money aboard Japan Air Lines Flight 514 – a Boeing 747SR-46 with 215 people on board – during a domestic flight in Japan from Sapporo to Tokyo′s Haneda Airport. Security forces storm the airliner at Tokyo and arrest the hijacker.
- April 12 – United States Marine Corps helicopters conduct Operation Eagle Pull, the evacuation of Embassy personnel, US citizens and designated Cambodians from Phnom Penh, Cambodia.
- April 16 – Evergreen International Airlines is founded.
- April 19 – Making the last flight by a fixed-wing aircraft out of Saigon, a Republic of Vietnam Air Force C-130 Hercules normally configured to seat 92 passengers and a crew of five carries a record load for a C-130 of 452 passengers – South Vietnamese and Americans fleeing the North Vietnamese – and the pilot. Thirty-two of the passengers ride on the flight deck.
- April 25 – After drinking heavily aboard United Airlines Flight 344 – a Boeing 727 with 67 people on board flying from Raleigh, North Carolina, to Newark, New Jersey – 44-year-old Frank Page Covey announces that he is carrying explosives and demands that the airliner fly him to Cuba because he "wanted to see Castro." After the plane lands in Atlanta, Georgia, Covey releases all the passengers and flight attendants. While he is negotiating with United Airlines officials over the radio, the pilot, copilot, and flight engineer sneak out the plane's rear exit, leaving Covey alone on the plane. Agents of the U.S. Federal Bureau of Investigation then board the airliner and arrest Covey.
- April 30
  - United States Air Force, Navy, and Marine Corps aircraft conduct Operation Frequent Wind, evacuating 7,000 American and at risk South Vietnamese from Saigon.
  - South Vietnam surrenders to North Vietnam, bringing the Vietnam War to an end. With the collapse of South Vietnam, its air force, the Republic of Vietnam Air Force, disintegrated, with dozens of helicopters flying out to the ships of U.S. Navy Task Force 76 and fixed-wing aircraft flying to Thailand. South Vietnam's national flag carrier, Air Vietnam, ceases operations; North Vietnam's Vietnam Airlines takes control of only two of Air Vietnam's airliners, a Boeing 707 and a Boeing 727-100.

=== May ===
- May 11 – A PLUNA Vickers 769D Viscount (registration CX-AQO) runs off the end of the runway while landing at Aeroparque Jorge Newbery in Buenos Aires, Argentina. The aircraft is a total loss, but all 57 people on board survive.
- May 12 - The Mayaguez incident begins. U.S. Air Force and U.S. Navy aircraft begin searching for the American container ship SS Mayaguez, which Cambodian Khmer Rouge forces seized earlier in the day in the Gulf of Thailand.
- May 13–14 - U.S. Navy P-3 Orion patrol aircraft discover Mayaguez off Cambodia's Puolo Wai island. For two days, U.S. Navy and U.S. Air Force aircraft exchange fire with Khmer Rouge ground and sea forces in the vicinity of Mayaguez.
- May 15
  - Eight U.S. Air Force helicopters carry a force of U.S. Marines in an assault on Cambodia's Koh Tang island in an attempt to rescue the crew of Mayaguez; three are shot down. U.S. Navy A-6B Intruder and A-7E Corsair II bombers and F-4N Phantom II fighters from the aircraft carrier USS Coral Sea (CVA-43) strike Ream airfield and targets at Kompong Som in Cambodia. The Khmer Rouge releases the Mayaguez crew, which actually is being held at Rong Som Lem island.
  - A hijacker commandeers United Air Lines Flight 509 – a Boeing 737-200 with 80 people on board – during a flight from Eugene, Oregon, to San Francisco, California. After the airliner lands at San Francisco International Airport, the hijacker is taken down.

=== June ===
- June 22 – Svetlana Savitskaya sets a new women's airspeed record of 2,683 km/h (1,667 mph) in the Mikoyan Ye-133, a modified MiG-25PU two-seat trainer.
- June 24 – Eastern Air Lines Flight 66, a Boeing 727-255, crashes on final approach to John F. Kennedy International Airport in Jamaica, New York, killing 113 of the 124 people on board. American Basketball Association player Wendell Ladner is among the dead.
- June 28 – A hijacker commandeers a Balkan Bulgarian Airlines Antonov An-24 during a domestic flight in Bulgaria from Varna to Sofia, demanding to be flown to Greece. The airliner diverts to Thessaloniki, Greece, where the hijacker surrenders to the authorities.
- June 30
  - The United States disestablishes the Continental Air Defense Command.
  - The United States Navy reclassifies all of its "attack aircraft carriers" (CVA) as "aircraft carriers" (CV); "nuclear-powered attack aircraft carriers" (CVA(N)) become "nuclear-powered aircraft carriers" (CVN).

=== July ===
- July 12 – The U.S. Navy retires the last Douglas DC-3 variant in its inventory, a C-117 Skytrain II, after a final flight from Naval Air Station Pensacola, Florida, to Davis-Monthan Air Force Base, Arizona.
- July 15 – Attempting a go-around in poor weather at Chorokh Airport in Batumi in the Soviet Union's Georgian Soviet Socialist Republic, Aeroflot Flight E-15, a Yakovlev Yak-40 (registration CCCP-87475), crashes into Mount Mtirala 18 kilometers (11 miles) east of the airport, killing all 40 people on board.
- July 26 – A Colombian Air Force Douglas C-47 Skytrain (registration FAC-654), crashes in Colombia's Sierra Nevada de Cocuy, killing all 10 people on board.
- July 28 – A 17-year-old male passenger hijacks a Japan Air Lines Lockheed L-1011 Tristar with 286 people on board during a domestic flight in Japan from Tokyo′s Haneda Airport to Sapporo. The captain flies the plane back to Haneda Airport, where the passengers all disembark. After the plane is refueled, the hijacker demands to be flown to Hawaii; when the captain explains that the plane cannot fly that far, the hijacker demands to be flown to Okinawa. The police then board the plane and arrest him.
- July 31 – Far Eastern Air Transport Flight 134, a Vickers 837 Viscount (registration B-2029), stalls and crashes on the runway while landing in a heavy rainstorm at Taipei Songshan Airport in Taipei, Taiwan, killing 27 of the 75 people on board.

=== August ===
- August 3
  - A Royal Jordanian Airlines Boeing 707-321B chartered by Royal Air Maroc strikes a mountainside in the Atlas Mountains near Agadir, Morocco, while on approach to Inezgane Airport, killing all 188 people on board. It remains the deadliest accident in history involving a Boeing 707.
  - Flying from Veracruz, Mexico, to San Salvador, El Salvador, a Nicaraguan Air Force Douglas C-47 Skytrain is forced to divert due to bad weather at San Salvador. Before it can land at another airport, it runs out of fuel and crashes into the Pacific Ocean off Punta Amapala, El Salvador, killing all 21 people on board. It is the deadliest aviation accident in the history of El Salvador at the time.
- August 5 – At the end of a 7-minute flight in the Martin Marietta X-24B that reaches a speed of 1,381 km/h (858 mph; 746 kn) and an altitude of 18.29 km (11.36 mi; 60,000 ft), test pilot John A. Manke, flying for the National Aeronautics and Space Administration (NASA) Flight Research Center at Edwards Air Force Base, California, makes the first controlled landing of a lifting body, demonstrating that lifting bodies could be landed on runways. The unpowered landing influences the designers of the Space Shuttle, who decide to forego the use of jet engines in the Space Shuttle and instead design it to make unpowered landings.
- August 9
  - Japan Air Lines establishes Japan Asia Airways as a subsidiary.
  - On approach in clouds to Bagdarin Airport in Bagdarin in the Soviet Union's Russian Soviet Federated Socialist Republic, an Aeroflot Ilyushin Il-14M (registration CCCP-52056) strays off course and crashes into a wooded hillside 28 kilometers (17 miles) from the airport, killing all 11 people on board.
- August 15 – An Aeroflot Yakovlev Yak-40 (registration CCCP-87323) encounters a strong downdraft at an altitude of 300 meters (980 feet) during a night approach to Krasnovodsk Airport in Krasnovodsk in the Soviet Union's Turkmen Soviet Socialist Republic. The airliner almost stalls and banks heavily before its fuselage strikes cliffs along the Caspian Sea coast 4.7 kilometers (2.9 miles) short of the runway. Its right wing and engine separate, it bounces off the cliff, and then it crashes into another cliff and catches fire. The crash kills 23 of the 28 people on board. It is the worst aviation accident in the history of Turkmenistan.
- August 20 – ČSA Flight 540, an Ilyushin Il-62, en route from Prague to Tehran via Damascus and Baghdad crashes into a sand dune while on approach to Damascus International Airport, Syria, killing 126 of the 128 people on board. It remains the deadliest accident in the history of ČSA.
- August 30 – Wien Air Alaska Flight 99, a Fairchild F-27B, crashes into Sevuokuk Mountain while on approach to Gambell, Alaska, in fog, killing 10 of the 32 people on board and injuring all 22 survivors.

=== September ===
- September 1
  - Too low on approach to Leipzig/Halle Airport in Schkeuditz, East Germany, an Interflug Tupolev Tu-134 (registration DM-SCD) strikes a radio mast at an altitude of 2 to 3 meters (6.6 to 9.8 ft), damaging its left wing and causing its left engine to detach. It crashes short of the runway, killing 27 of the 34 people on board.
  - Concorde G-BOAC, due to be delivered to British Airways the following year, becomes the first ever aircraft to make four Transatlantic crossings in a single day.
- September 2
  - The unified Canadian Armed Forces merges its aviation services into a single command, the Canadian Forces Air Command.
  - New all-year Svalbard Airport, Longyear, opens on permafrost at Hotellneset, operated by Avinor. It is the world's northernmost airport with public scheduled flights.
- September 3 – Retired American professional baseball player Irv Medlinger is one of two people killed aboard a Piper PA-24 Comanche destroyed while attempting a crash-landing near Wheeling, Illinois, after its engine fails.
- September 9 – Three hijackers commandeer a Haiti Inter Air de Havilland Canada DHC-6 Twin Otter during a domestic flight in Haiti from Port-au-Prince to Cap Haitien, demanding to be flown to Cuba. The airliner diverts to Gonaives, Haiti, where the hijackers are taken down.
- September 15 – A 24-year-old gunman rapes a woman, attempts to rob a store, and goes to Reid–Hillview Airport in San Jose, California, accompanied by two hostages. At Reid-Hillview Airport he takes a security guard hostage, and then goes to San Jose Municipal Airport, where he takes two Continental Airlines mechanics hostage and boards a parked Continental Airlines Boeing 727. Two hostages escape, and after negotiations between the authorities and the gunman, a sniper shoots and kills him.
- September 24 – Garuda Indonesia Flight 150, a Fokker F-28 Fellowship, crashes in bad weather and fog on approach to Sultan Mahmud Badaruddin II Airport in Palembang on Sumatra in Indonesia, killing 25 of the 61 people on board and injuring all 36 survivors. One person on the ground also dies.
- September 26 – A fire breaks out in the No.1 engine of a Portuguese Air Force Nord 2501D Noratlas shortly after it takes off from Tancos Air Base in Tancos, Portugal. The fire causes the wing to collapse in flight, and the Noratlas crashes near the air base, killing all 11 people on board.
- September 27 – A hijacker commandeers an Olympic Airways Short SC.7 Skyvan during a domestic flight in Greece from Athens to Mikonos. The hijacker is taken down at Mikonos.
- September 30 – Malév Hungarian Airlines Flight 240, a Tupolev Tu-154B, crashes in the Mediterranean Sea off the coast of Lebanon, killing all 60 people on board.

=== October ===
- During the month, members of the Flying Club of Angola gather in Luanda, Portuguese Angola. They will form the basis of the People's Air Force of Angola, which will be established in January 1976.
- October 5 – Leftist guerrillas hijack an Aerolineas Argentinas Boeing 737-287C (registration LV-JNE) during a domestic flight in Argentina from Buenos Aires to Corrientes. They force the airliner to divert to Formosa, Argentina, where they allow all the passengers to disembark. Another group of guerrillas who had staged an armed raid on a police garrison in Formosa join the hijackers aboard the plane. The hijackers then order the plane to fly to Brazil, but it runs low on fuel and lands at Rafaela, Argentina, where the guerrillas disembark and escape.
- October 7 – A hijacker commandeers a Philippine Air Lines BAC One-Eleven during a domestic flight in the Philippines from Davao City to Manila, demanding to be flown to Libya. The airliner lands at Manila, where the hijacker surrenders.
- October 14 – An RAF Avro Vulcan B.2, XM645, explodes and crashes over Żabbar, Malta after an aborted landing, killing five crew members and one person on the ground.
- October 22 – On approach in fog to Novgorod Airport in Novgorod in the Soviet Union's Russian Soviet Federated Socialist Republic, an Aeroflot Yakovlev Yak-40 (registration CCCP-87458) drifts off course. Its landing gear and wing strike a building, after which the airliner crashes into an apartment building and a car, starting a fire. The crash kills all six people on the plane and five people on the ground.
- October 23 – Attempting a go-around after a missed approach in a heavy rain shower at Cairns Airport in Cairns, Australia, Connair Flight 1263, a de Havilland DH.114 Riley Heron (registration VH-CLS) crashes, killing all 11 people on board.
- October 27 – An overloaded TAM – Transporte Aéreo Militar Convair CV-440-12 (registration TAM-44) on a domestic flight in Bolivia carrying military officers and their wives and children to La Paz fails to gain enough altitude to pass over the Andes after taking off from Tomonoco. It crashes into the stratovolcano Cerro Colorado, killing all 67 people on board.
- October 30 – A chartered Yugoslavian McDonnell Douglas DC-9-32 operating as Inex-Adria Aviopromet Flight 450 crashes in the suburb of Suchdol while on final approach to land at Prague, Czechoslovakia, in foggy weather, killing 75 of the 120 people on board. It is the deadliest aviation accident in the history of Czechoslovakia.

=== November ===
- November 12 – Overseas National Airways Flight 032, a Douglas DC-10 (registration N1032F) carrying 129 of the airline's employees and a crew of 10 on a ferry flight to Jeddah, Saudi Arabia, via Frankfurt-am-Main, West Germany, flies through a flock of seagulls on takeoff from John F. Kennedy International Airport in New York City. Its No. 3 engine ingests some of the seagulls, starting a fire on the right wing. The pilots abort the takeoff and stop the airliner on a taxiway, and all 139 people on board evacuate safely, but the fire spreads and destroys the plane.
- November 17 – Off course after flying around a thunderstorm, an Aeroflot Antonov An-24RV (registration CCCP-46467) crashes into 2,250-meter (7,380-foot) Mount Apshara 25 kilometers (16 miles) northeast of Gali in the Soviet Union's Georgian Soviet Socialist Republic after beginning a descent to Sukhumi Babushara Airport outside Sukhumi. The airliner strikes the mountain 330 meters (1,080 feet) below its summit, killing all 38 people on board.
- November 18 – An Aviateca Douglas C-47-DL Skytrain (registration TG-AGA) crashes in Guatemala's Petén Department, killing 15 of the 22 people on board.
- November 20
  - On descent to Kharkov Airport in Kharkov in the Soviet Union's Ukrainian Soviet Socialist Republic, an Aeroflot Antonov An-24B (registration CCCP-46349) strikes trees and crashes into a hillside 17 kilometers (11 miles) west of the airport, killing 19 of the 50 people on board.
  - A Hawker Siddeley HS.125 operated by Hawker Siddeley Aviation strikes a flock of lapwings while taking off from Dunsfold Aerodrome in Surrey, England, in the United Kingdom. Returning to the airport, it runs off the end of the runway, crosses fields, runs through hedges, strikes a ditch, and bounces across a road, colliding with a Ford Cortina automobile, before coming to rest after crossing another field. All nine people aboard the aircraft survive, but all six people in the car die.
- November 25 – Flying through clouds at night during a military exercise, an Israeli Air Force Lockheed C-130H Hercules crashes into the mountain Gebel Halal (also known as Jebel Halal) 56 kilometers (35 miles) south-southeast of El Arish, Egypt, killing all 20 people on board.
- November 29 – British race car drivers Graham Hill and Tony Brise along with all four other people on board die when the Piper PA-23 Turbo Aztec that Hill is piloting becomes lost in fog and darkness and crashes near Arkley golf course in the London Borough of Barnet, England, while attempting to land at Elstree Airfield.

=== December ===
- December 26
  - The world's first supersonic transport enters service, when the Tupolev Tu-144 makes its first commercial flight for Aeroflot, carrying air mail and freight on a domestic service in the Soviet Union between Moscow and Alma-Ata. The Tu-144 will not begin passenger service until November 1977.
  - A Star Aviation Mitsubishi MU-2B crashes in mountainous terrain near Rollinsville, Colorado, while flying in adverse weather conditions. American actress Myrna Ross is among the dead.
- December 28 – The Soviet Union commissions the "heavy aircraft-carrying cruiser" Kiev, the first Soviet or Russian ship capable of operating fixed-wing aircraft. A hybrid ship combining a partial angled flight deck with the heavy anti-ship missile armament of a Soviet guided-missile cruiser, she operates only vertical or short takeoff and landing (VSTOL) jets and helicopters.
- December 29 – A bomb equivalent in power to 25 sticks of dynamite detonates in a Trans World Airlines locker at LaGuardia Airport, killing 11 people and injuring 75; it is the deadliest bomb explosion in New York City since the Wall Street bombing of 1920. No one ever claims credit for the bombing, which remains unsolved.

== First flights ==
- Cessna 441 Conquest, later known as the Cessna 441 Conquest II

=== January ===
- January 24 - Aerospatiale SA 365 Dauphin F-WVKE
- January 25 - Birdman TL-1, lightest piloted powered aircraft

=== February ===
- February 6 – Beechcraft PD 285
- February 22 - Sukhoi T-8-1, prototype of the Su-25 attack aircraft
- February 26 - Cessna 404 Titan N5404J

=== March ===
- Bellanca Skyrocket II
- March 7 – Yakovlev Yak-42 CCCP-1974
- March 27 – de Havilland Canada DHC-7 C-GNBX-X
- March 30 – Jurca 1-Nine-0

=== April ===
- April 21 - Dominion Skytrader 800 N800ST

=== May ===
- May 5 – Isaacs Spitfire
- May 21 - Rutan VariEze N7EZ

=== June ===
- June 3 - Mitsubishi F-1 59-5107
- June 15 - Akaflieg Stuttgart FS-29
- June 16 - Atlas C4M Kudu ZS-IZF (military prototype)
- June 18 – Chasle LMC-1 Sprintair
- June 29 - Jeffair Barracuda

=== July ===
- July 1 - Valmet L-70 Vinka
- July 2 - Bowers Namu II
- July 4 – Boeing 747SP
- July 18 - Zlín Z-50

=== August ===
- August 26 - Cessna 441 Conquest II N441CC
- August 26 - McDonnell Douglas YC-15 72-1875
- August 29 - Robinson R22

=== September ===
- September 16 - Mikoyan Ye-155MP
- September 30 - Hughes YAH-64 73-22248

=== October ===
- October 1 - Bell YAH-63
- October 29 - Harmon Mister America

=== November ===
- November 13 - Fuji/Rockwell Commander 700
- November 19 - AmEagle American Eaglet
- November 23 - Schleicher ASW 19

== Entered service ==
- Late 1975 – Beechcraft Baron Model 58P
- Late 1975 – Beechcraft King Air Model B100

=== March ===
- March 5 – Shin Meiwa US-1 with the Japan Maritime Self-Defense Force

=== April ===
- April 14 – IAF Kfir C.1 with two squadrons of the Israeli Air Force

=== October ===
- Bell 206L LongRanger

=== December ===
- December 26 – Tupolev Tu-144, the world's first supersonic transport, with Aeroflot

== Retired from service ==
- November 26 – Martin Marietta X-24B by the NASA Flight Research Center and the United States Air Force

== Deadliest crash ==
The deadliest crash of this year was the Agadir air disaster, the crash of an Alia Boeing 707 which crashed in mountainous terrain on approach to Agadir, Morocco on 3 August, killing all 188 people on board.
