= Doha International Airport =

Doha International Airport مطار الدوحة الدولي

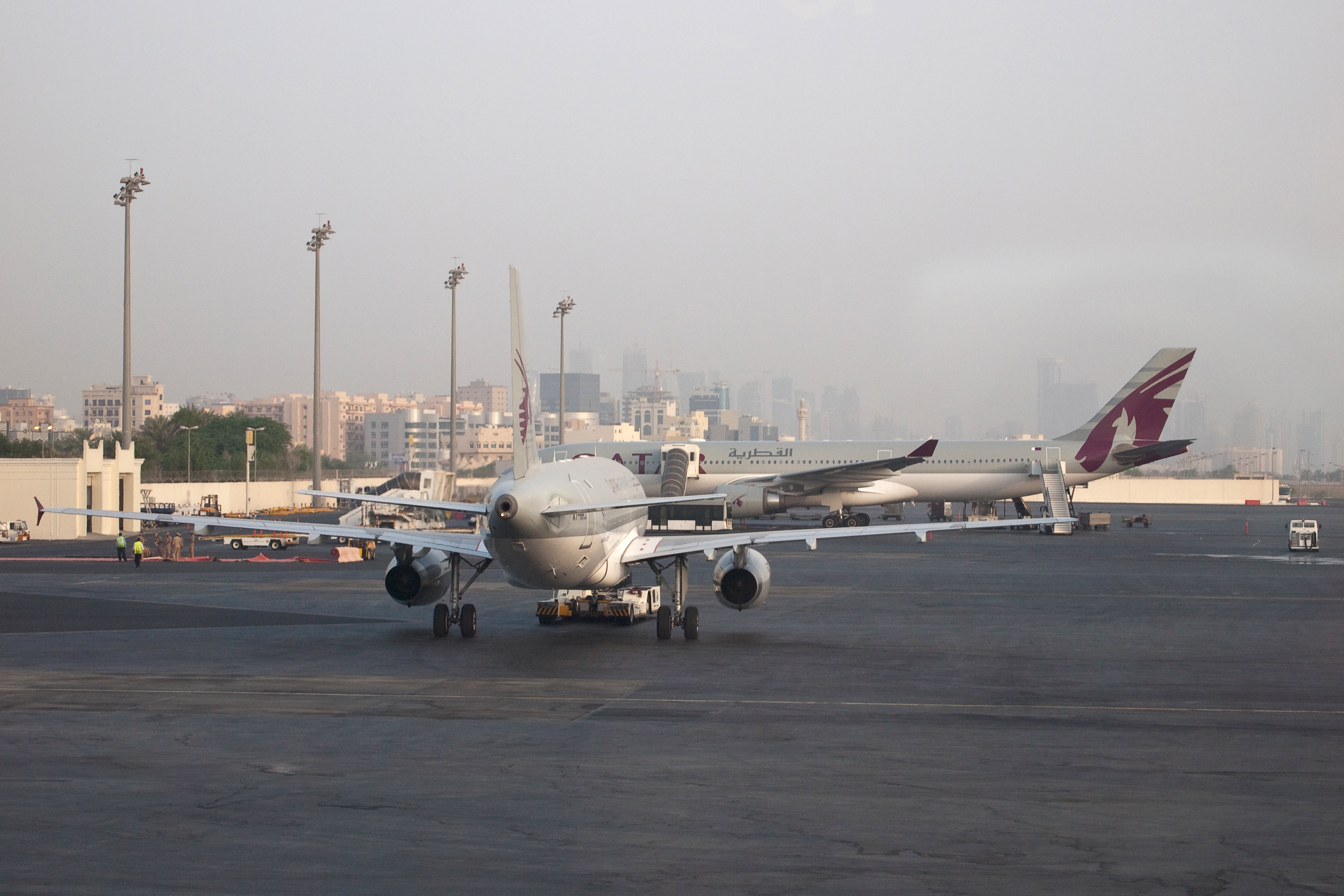
- IATA: DIA; ICAO: OTBD

Summary
- Airport type: Public / Military / private
- Operator: Qatar Civil Aviation Authority
- Serves: Doha, Qatar
- Location: Doha, Qatar
- Hub for: Qatar Amiri Flight; Gulf Helicopters; Qatar Executive
- Elevation AMSL: 35 ft (11 m)
- Coordinates: 25°15′40″N 051°33′54″E

Map
- Location of airport in Doha, Qatar DIA/OTBD (Qatar) DIA/OTBD (Middle East) DIA/OTBD (West and Central Asia) DIA/OTBD (Asia)

Runways
Direction	Length		Surface
Direction	m	ft	Surface
15/33	4,572	14,993	Asphalt

Statistics (2010)
- Passengers: 37,300,000
- Sources: Civil Aviation Affairs; Statistics from Doha Airport, Worldaerodata.com

Doha International Airport (IATA: DIA, ICAO: OTBD) (Arabic: مطار الدوحة الدولي) is an international airport in Doha, Qatar, which served as the country's primary commercial airport until the nearby Hamad International Airport opened in May 2014. Since the handover of commercial air traffic to Hamad, the original Doha airfield is now used mainly for government and diplomatic flights as well as general aviation, although both airports were used simultaneously to handle the increased commercial traffic during the 2022 FIFA World Cup.

== History ==
Doha International Airport opened in 1959 replacing Dukhan Airport, which was built in the 1930s. That had been the secondary hub for the Bahraini-based Gulf Air, and was located 80 kilometres (50 mi) west of Doha, and five kilometres (3 mi) south-west of Dukhan.

The airport suffered from overutilization, even though it had been expanded numerous times. Before the opening of the new airport, the capacity stood at 12 million passengers per year. Its 4,570-metre (14,993 ft) runway was one of the longest at a civil airport. It was the main base of Qatar Airways. In the past, the airport was mostly used by Qatari holiday makers and foreign workers coming for the oil and gas sector. As Qatar Airways expanded rapidly, the airport grew and attracted more people such as holiday makers and transit travelers. In 2010, it was the world's 27th busiest airport by cargo traffic. The control tower and ancillary buildings were designed by Curtis W. Fentress, FAIA, RIBA of Fentress Architects.

All scheduled commercial air traffic serving this airport moved to the new Hamad International Airport on 27 May 2014. The new airport is located four kilometres (2 1/2 miles) east of the former facility. It covers 2,200 hectares (5,400 acres) of land and was able to handle 29 million passengers per year on opening day. The old airport was originally planned to be demolished, but it was refurbished and reopened for the 2022 FIFA World Cup and certain charter flights.

== Terminals ==
=== Departure and Transfer Terminal ===
This was the main terminal at Doha and handled all economy class Qatar Airways flights, as well as all other airlines using the airport. This terminal was expanded several times in order to cope with the increasing number of passengers using the airport each year. The terminal had 44 satellite gates, as well as seating areas and a large duty-free area. There were 3 lounges in this terminal, including the Oryx Lounge, which was used by all foreign airlines' premium passengers, the Qatar Airways Gold Lounge, which was used by Qatar Airways Gold Privilege Club members, and the Qatar Airways Silver Lounge, used by Qatar Airways silver privilege club card holders. This terminal had been expanded as the old Arrivals Terminal was integrated into the departures terminal, while a new arrival terminal was opened. All departing and transferring passengers used this facility, as passengers arriving into Doha used the new Arrivals Terminal. The Departure and Transfer Terminal opened an additional 12 boarding positions located between the terminal and the Premium Terminal gates, as well as a revamped Oryx lounge to cater for the increase in passenger numbers. The passenger facilities featured 60 check-in counters, 42 parking bays for aircraft and 15 baggage claim belts.

==== Terminal A ====
Terminal A of the Departure and Transfer Terminal was the check-in area used by the airport's biggest user, Qatar Airways, as well as Cathay Pacific, which operated a codeshare with Qatar Airways to Hong Kong under a strategic partnership agreement.

==== Terminal B ====
In June 2011, Terminal B, built on the location of the former arrivals terminal at Doha International Airport, was dedicated to more than 30 foreign airlines operating services from Doha. The terminal included an enlarged check-in area with 35 counters and a new baggage handling system, as well as food outlets. All foreign airlines were moved to Terminal B.

All terminals have been renovated recently and will be operational by the end 2021 or early to mid-2022 for the FIFA football World Cup that will be held in Qatar.

=== Arrivals Terminal ===
On 19 December 2010, a new Arrival Terminal was opened in the western apron, in the site of the former Asian Games (which Doha hosted in 2006) temporary terminal. The terminal had a capacity of 2,770 passengers per hour. The 32,000-square-metre (340,000 sq ft) Arrivals Terminal replaced the arrivals hall of what became the Departure and Transfer Terminal. The Arrivals Terminal had 22 immigration counters, eight e-gates, eight baggage carousels, 36 concierge desks for hotel transfers, car rental and other services, as well as 746 parking spaces. The former arrivals hall was merged with the departing hall, adding extra valuable space and capacity to the airport. These changes were part of the multimillion-dollar expansion of Doha Airport to cope with the increasing traffic of Qatar Airways and other airlines before the new Hamad International Airport opened in 2014.

=== Qatar Airways Premium Terminal ===
The Qatar Airways Premium Terminal was opened in 2006 and handled all Qatar Airways first and business class passengers. There are 6 gates in this terminal.

== Airlines and destinations ==
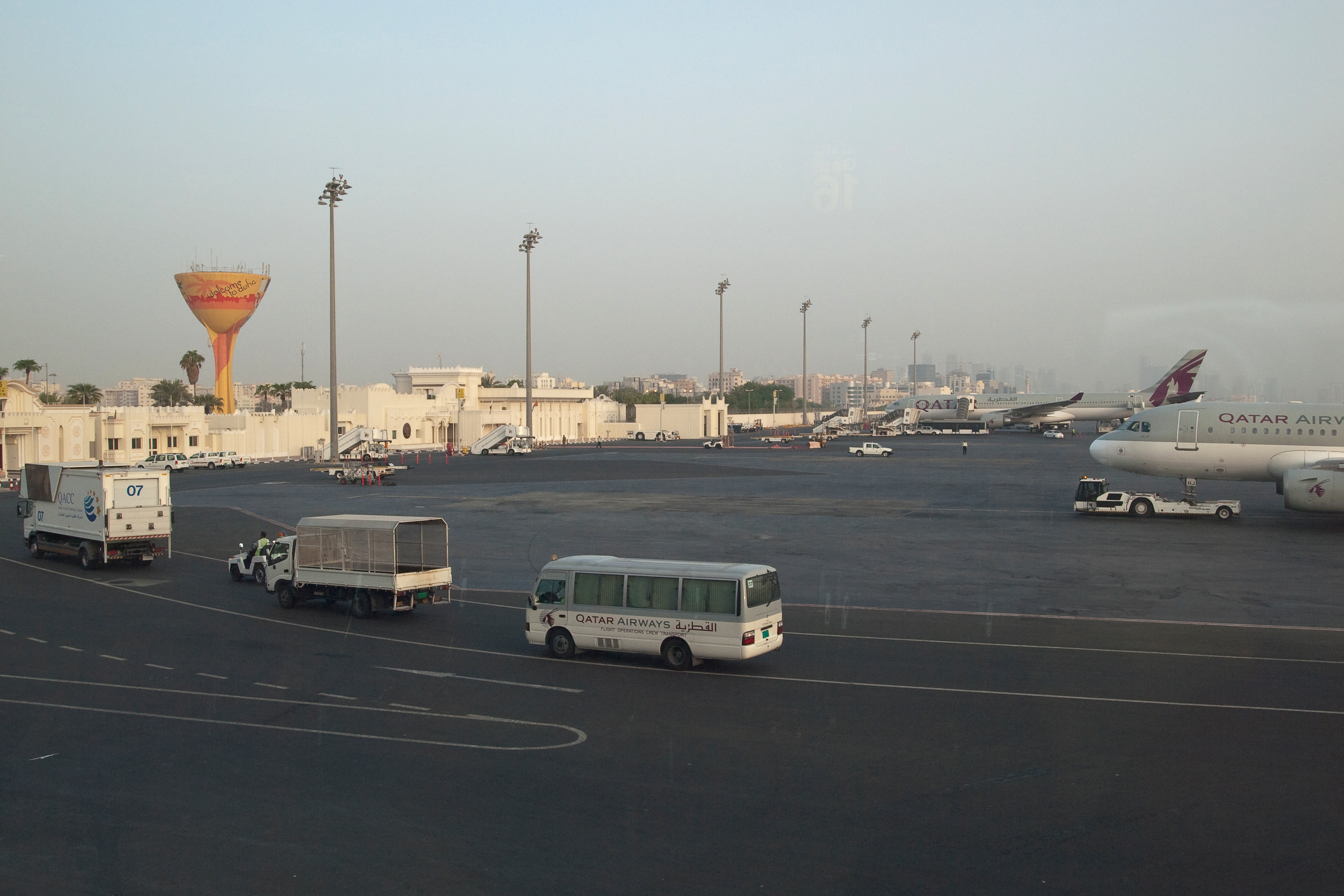
Ramp overview

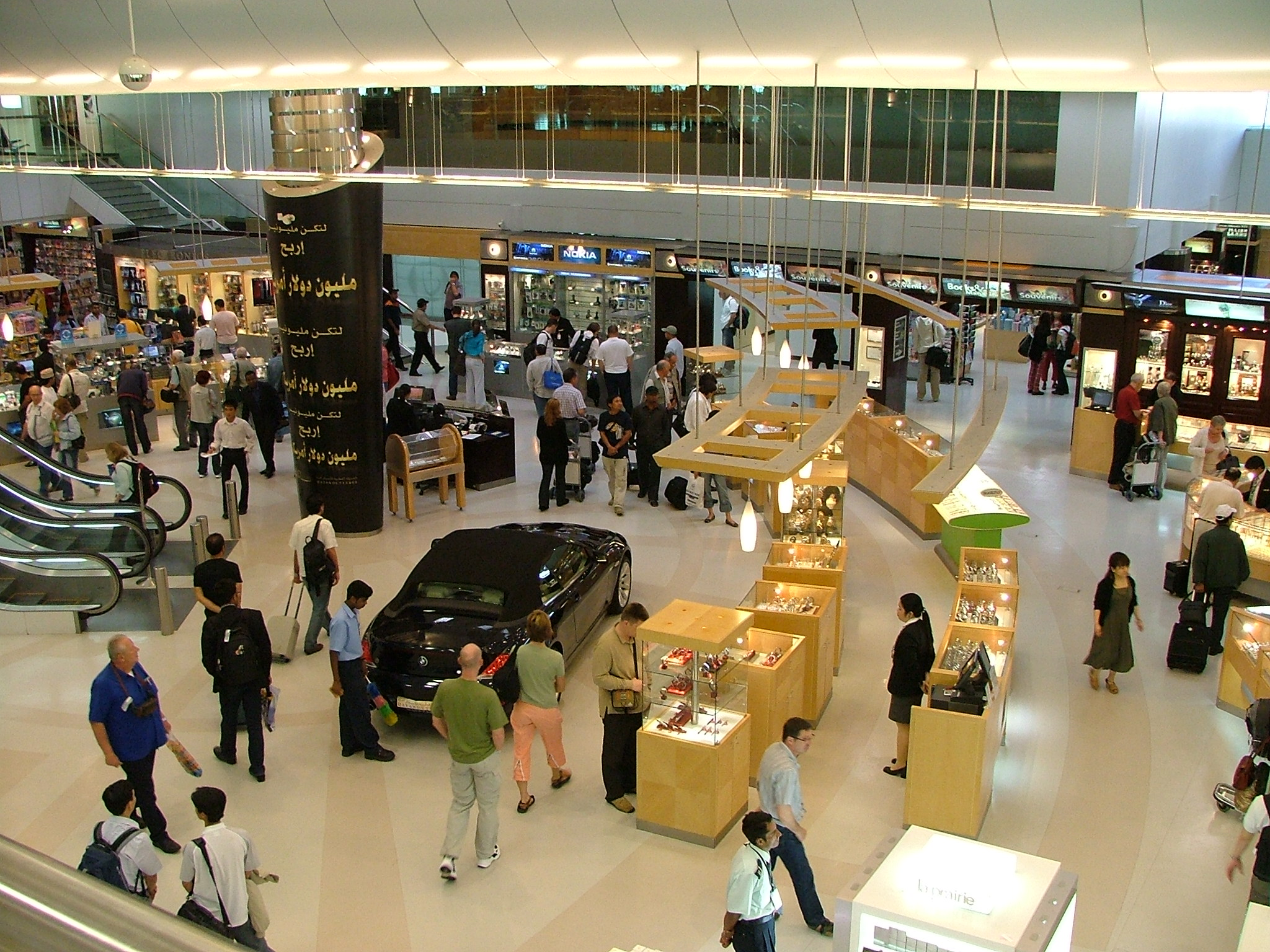
Airside area

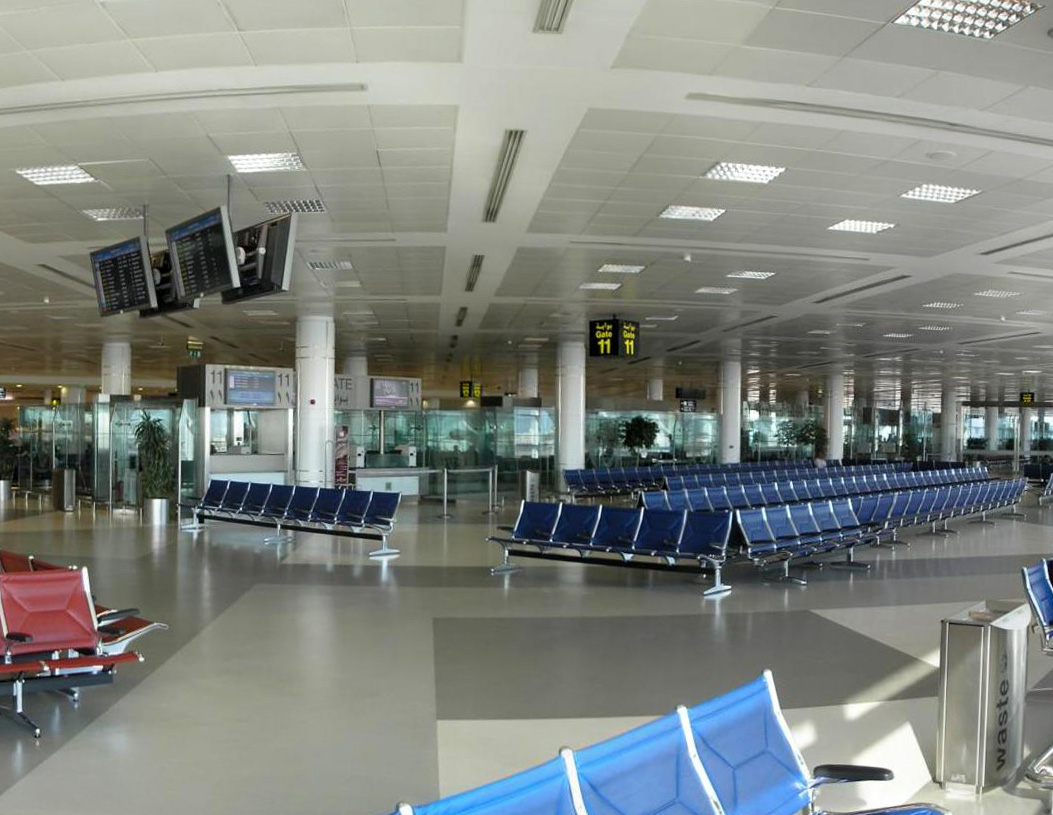
Gate area

The airport shut down for commercial traffic on 27 May 2014 when all airlines relocated to its successor, Hamad International Airport. The last commercial flight departing from Doha International Airport was a Lufthansa plane returning to its home base of Frankfurt at 00:30 on 28 May 2014.

On 14 September 2022, the airport was temporarily reopened for passenger traffic to relieve congestion at Hamad airport due to the 2022 FIFA World Cup. At least 13 airlines, including Etihad Airways, Flydubai, Pegasus Airlines, Jazeera Airways, Pakistan International Airlines, Nepal Airlines and SalamAir moved their regular scheduled flights to the airport until shortly after the end of the World Cup. Designated Match Day Shuttle flights used the newer Hamad airport instead. All flights to the older airport came to a halt after the World Cup was over.

== Statistics ==
Since 1998, the number of passengers and total cargo load increased significantly.

Statistics for Doha International Airport
Year	Total passengers	Total Cargo (tons)	Total Cargo (1000s lbs)	Aircraft movements
1998	2,100,000	86,854		
1999	2,300,000	62,591		
2002	4,406,304	90,879	200,351	77,402
2003	5,245,364	118,406	261,037	42,130
2004	7,079,540	160,088	352,930	51,830
2005	9,377,003	207,988	458,530	59,671
2006	11,954,030	262,061	577,739	103,724
2007	9,459,812	252,935	557,626	65,373
2008	12,272,505	414,872	914,636	90,713
2009	13,113,224	528,906	1,166,038	101,941
2010	15,724,027	707,831	1,560,498	118,751
2011	18,108,521	795,558	1,753,905	136,768
2012	21,163,597			
2013	23,266,187			

== Accidents and incidents ==
- On 13 March 1979, an Alia Royal Jordanian Boeing 727 operating Flight 600 crashed following a missed approach. Out of the 64 people on board, three crew members and 42 passengers were killed. The remaining 19 occupants of the flight were injured but survived. The aircraft was written off.
- In 2000, an Iraqi hijacker hijacked a Qatar Airways plane and demanded that the pilot fly to Saudi Arabia. The passengers and crew escaped unharmed when the man surrendered to Saudi authorities at the city of Hael.

== See also ==
- Transport in Qatar
- List of airports in Qatar
- Old Airport (Doha), the district near the airport
