= Alia Royal Jordanian Flight 600 =

1979 aviation accident in Qatar

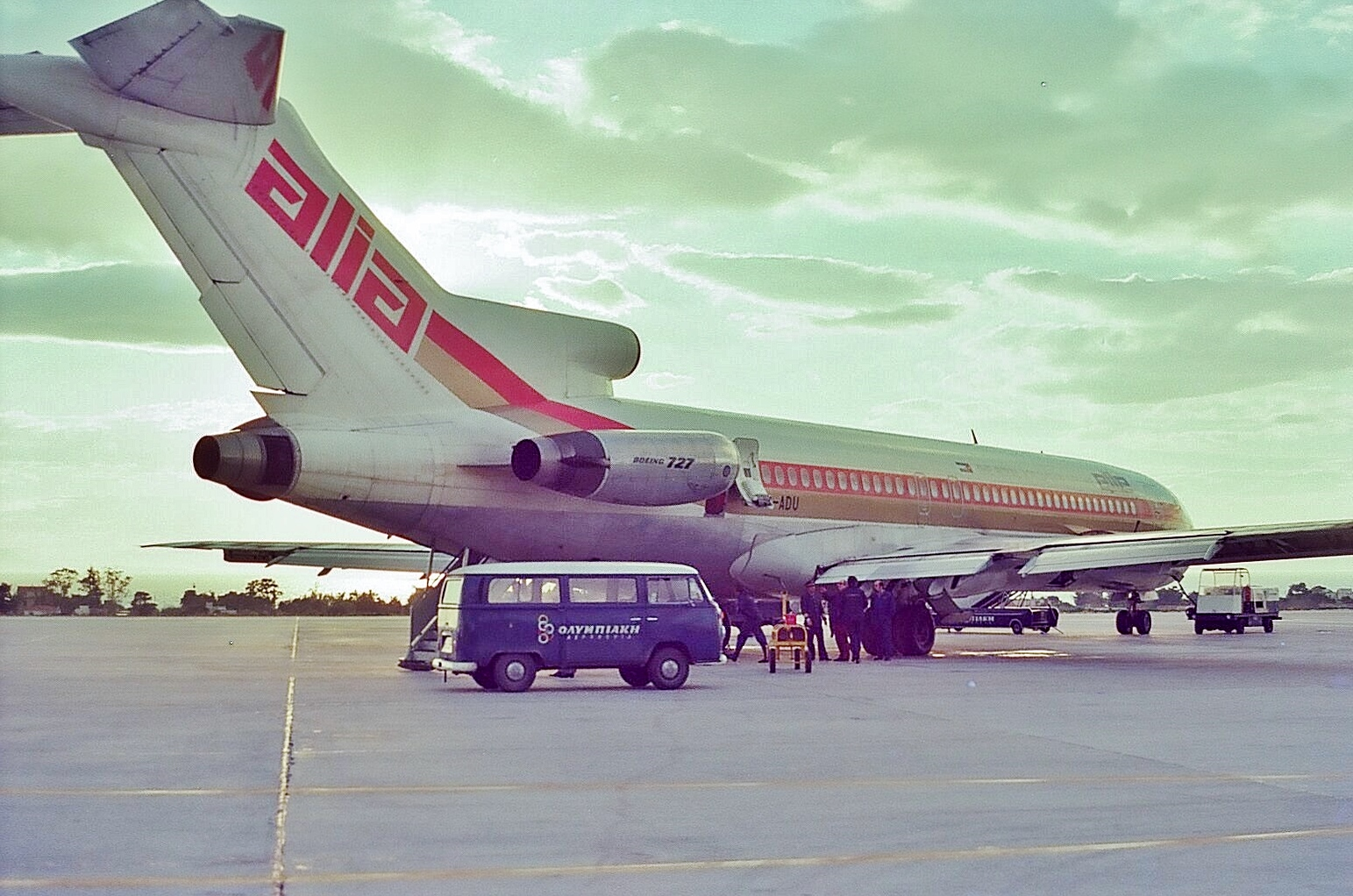
- JY-ADU, the aircraft involved in the accident, pictured in 1977

Accident
- Date: 13 March 1979
- Summary: Loss of control on a missed approach caused by a microburst-induced wind shear
- Site: Doha International Airport, Doha, Qatar

Aircraft
- Aircraft type: Boeing 727-2D3
- Aircraft name: The City of Petra
- Operator: Alia Royal Jordanian Airlines
- IATA flight No.: RJ600
- ICAO flight No.: RJA600
- Call sign: ROYAL JORDANIAN 600
- Registration: JY-ADU
- Flight origin: Marka International Airport, Amman, Jordan
- Stopover: Doha International Airport, Doha, Qatar
- Destination: Seeb International Airport, Muscat, Oman
- Occupants: 64
- Passengers: 55
- Crew: 9
- Fatalities: 45
- Injuries: 15
- Survivors: 19

Alia Royal Jordanian Flight 600 was a scheduled international passenger flight from Marka International Airport, Jordan, to Seeb International Airport, Muscat, Oman, via Doha International Airport in Qatar. On the night of 13 March 1979, the Boeing 727 operating the flight was carrying out a missed approach to Doha's Runway 34 when it flew into a downburst, causing the aircraft to crash onto the runway, flip over and slide tail-first into a fire station, killing 41 passengers and 4 crew. However, there were also 19 survivors from those on board. The crash remains the deadliest aviation accident in the history of Qatar.

== Background ==
=== Aircraft ===
The aircraft was a Boeing 727-2D3 and was equipped with three Pratt & Whitney JT8D-17 jet engines. It was manufactured in 1974, registered in Jordan as JY-ADU in July 1974, and was delivered to Royal Jordanian in August 1974. The aircraft had flown a total of almost 10,200 flight hours as of 12 March 1979, one day prior to the accident flight.

=== Passengers and crew ===
There were 49 passengers and 15 crew members on board Flight 600. Alongside the pilots were six cabin crew members plus six extra crew members, the latter were seated throughout the cabin, and were treated as normal passengers.

The captain of the flight, 32-year old Isa al-Alami (عيسى العلمي), was the pilot monitoring. He had nearly 4,600 hours of flight time, of which 102 hours were as a Boeing 727 captain. The first officer, 38-year-old Mohammed Abu Hamdeh (محمد أبو حمدة), was the pilot flying. He had clocked almost 2,700 hours of flight time. The flight engineer was 24-year-old Adnan al-Sayegh (عدنان الصائغ). He had accumulated over 700 total flight hours.

All three pilots had conducted medical examinations in the months prior to the accident flight, and were deemed fit to fly.

=== Weather conditions ===
With a relatively high surface pressure coming from Iran, and a low-level air stream over Saudi Arabia, the conditions created a moist low-level air stream over Qatar, leading to the build-up of large cumulonimbus clouds and thunderstorms over the airfield. Weather reports indicated that rainfall was "violent" at the time of the accident, with the addition of "intense" lightning strikes near the airport. Two pilots on board an aircraft parked on the apron, awaiting clearance for takeoff, corroborated that.

== Accident ==
At 21:55 UTC, Alia Royal Jordanian Flight 600 departed Amman's Marka International Airport with 49 passengers and 15 crew on board. First Officer Abu Hamdeh (38) was at the controls while Captain al-Alami (32) was the pilot monitoring.

=== First approach attempt ===
At 23:08 UTC, the flight established radio contact with Doha International Airport, and the crew received information regarding the weather. The air traffic controller reported that the thunderstorm had been building up over and to the northwest of the airport. Captain al-Alami requested Runway 16, and was cleared for a visual approach. The controller later reported that the NDB beacon had tripped, likely due to a lightning strike, but minutes later, he reported that the beacon was back in service.

At 23:29 UTC, the pilots were lined up with Runway 16, but they reported that they had not seen the runway, subsequently initiating a missed approach. ATC cleared them to conduct an ILS approach to Runway 34, located at the opposite end.

=== Second approach attempt and crash ===
At 23:35 UTC, the aircraft was lined up with Runway 34 and the crew had the airfield in sight. In the next two minutes, the controller gave wind reports ranging from 150 degrees and 13-15 knots (kts) to 140 degrees and 17 kts. He also reported, through his own observation, that the rain was "very heavy," and that the visibility was likely less than 1 km.

Significant tailwinds during approach resulted in the pilots' difficulty maintaining a level descent, and at 23:37 UTC, at an altitude of 300 feet (ft) above field elevation (AFE), al-Alami and Abu Hamdeh agreed to conduct a missed approach before reaching decision height. Al-Alami requested clearance to divert to Dhahran, and the controller ordered the aircraft to climb straight ahead to 800 ft.

The aircraft was configured for the go-around and soon climbed at a rate of 1,300 ft per minute with its landing gear up and flaps at 25 degrees. While the plane was in a 12-degree climb at an altitude of 750 ft AFE, it flew directly into a downburst, resulting in a significant drop in airspeed, and an increase in descent rate, nearly -4,200 ft per minute. In a last ditch attempt, the crew increased engine power from go-around setting to a maximum setting, and the airspeed increased to 170 kts, but it was already too late.

At an attitude of 10 degrees nose up with a left bank angle of 5 degrees, the Boeing 727 struck the left edge of Runway 34 tail- and left-wing first, nearly 2,050 meters from the threshold. During the impact, the rear cabin windows broke, the rear baggage hold burst open, and engines No. 1 and 3 both detached from the aircraft. After the first impact, the aircraft bounced and flew for a further 100 meters before falling back to the ground again. It then yawed to the left and began to skid sideways over the adjacent taxiways. A few seconds later, the plane rolled to the right and flipped over, damaging the right wing and the upper half of the vertical stabilizer. Careering rearwards and on its right side, flight 600 slid tail-first into a fire station garage. The Boeing 727 broke into three main pieces and a fire erupted at the moment of impact.

Of the 64 passengers and crew, 25 were killed as a result of impact forces while 20 died due to severe burns. 11 crew members survived the accident, including First Officer Abu Hamdeh and Flight Engineer al-Sayegh, along with eight passengers. Captain al-Alami was killed as a result of impact forces, and was dead by the time the aircraft came to a halt.

== Investigation ==
=== Final report ===
In the final report, released by the State of Qatar on 15 December 1979, the investigation concluded that:

"The cause of the accident was the aircraft's encounter with a downburst associated with a thunderstorm, the effects of which exceeded the performance capability of the aircraft. The encounter resulted from the flight crew's decision to conduct an approach to land without due regard to the prevailing weather conditions."
