= Aeroflot Flight 217 =

1972 plane crash in Moscow, Russia

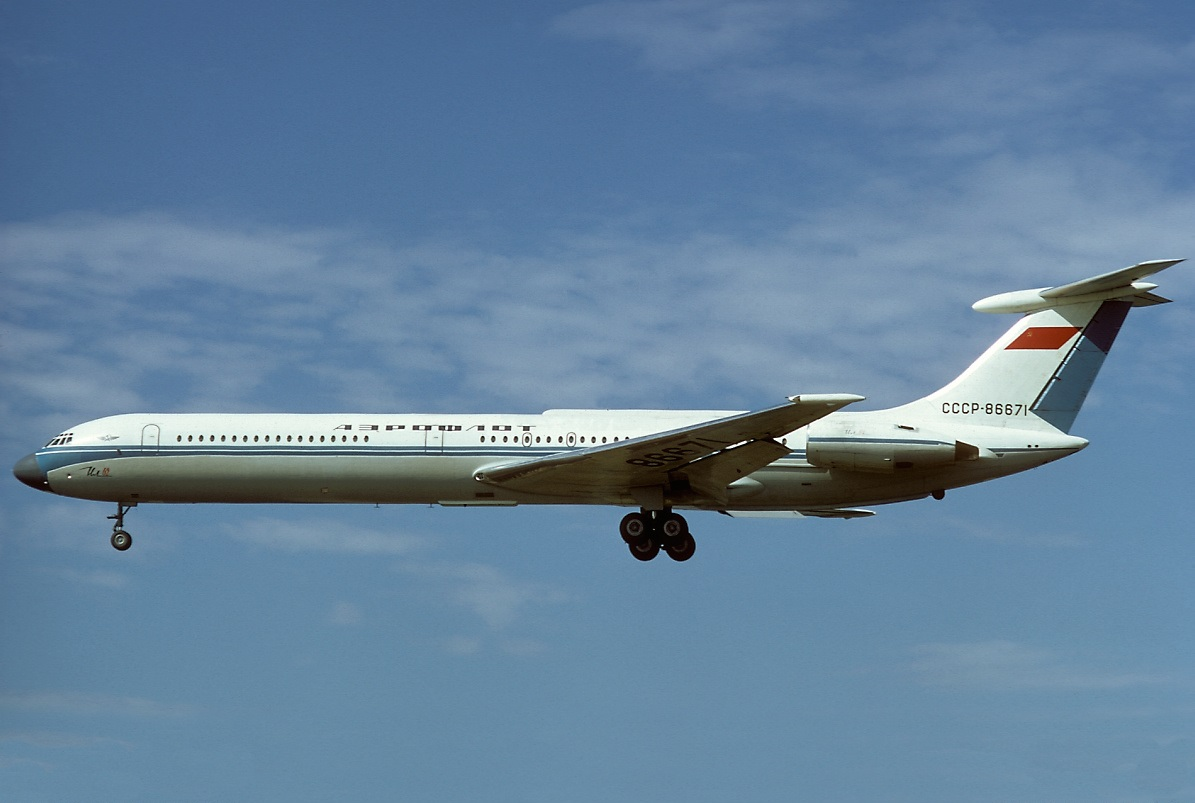
- CCCP-86671, the aircraft involved in the accident, seen in August 1972

Accident
- Date: 13 October 1972
- Summary: Crashed on approach; cause was not determined
- Site: Near Sheremetyevo International Airport, Lobnya, Russian SFSR, Soviet Union; 56°4′40″N 37°24′36″E

Aircraft
- Aircraft type: Ilyushin Il-62
- Operator: Aeroflot
- IATA flight No.: SU217
- ICAO flight No.: AFL217
- Call sign: AEROFLOT 217
- Registration: CCCP-86671
- Flight origin: Orly Airport
- Stopover: Shosseynaya Airport
- Destination: Sheremetyevo International Airport
- Occupants: 174
- Passengers: 164
- Crew: 10
- Fatalities: 174
- Survivors: 0

Aeroflot Flight 217 was a non-scheduled international passenger flight from Orly Airport in Paris to Sheremetyevo International Airport in Moscow, with a stopover at Shosseynaya Airport (now Pulkovo Airport) in Leningrad (now Saint Petersburg). On 13 October 1972, the Ilyushin Il-62 airliner operating the flight crashed on approach to Sheremetyevo, with the loss of all 164 passengers and crew of 10. At the time, it was the world's deadliest civil aviation disaster, until it was surpassed by the Kano air disaster in Nigeria in 1973. As of 2026, the crash of Flight 217 remains the second-deadliest accident involving an Il-62, after LOT Polish Airlines Flight 5055, and the second-deadliest on Russian soil, after Aeroflot Flight 3352.

== Passengers ==
Nation	Number
Algeria	6
Australia	1
Chile	38
East Germany	1
Soviet Union	118 (Note: 108 passengers and 10 crew.)
Total	174

== Crash ==
Shortly before the expected landing, the plane was flying at an altitude of 1,200 metres (3,900 ft) when it received instructions from ATC to descend to 400 metres (1,300 ft). The crew confirmed and started to descend normally, but the plane subsequently failed to level off horizontally. It passed the 400-metre (1,300 ft) mark at a vertical velocity of 20 m/s (66 ft/s), its engines still running at low thrust, without any further expected reports to ATC. It crashed shortly afterwards, with landing gear up, spoilers retracted and a horizontal speed of about 620 km/h (330 kn; 390 mph).

== Aftermath ==
=== Reactions ===
The Soviet media's reaction was delayed by 17 hours, with western media picking up on the disaster. The Soviets had refused to state if the aircraft was an Il-62 and if there were any foreigners onboard the flight.

=== Investigation ===
The cause of the crash could not be determined. Investigators believed the most probable cause was the 'psycho-physiological incapacitation of the crew for reasons unknown'. They speculated that somewhere around 500–600 metres (1,600–2,000 ft) altitude, 30–25 seconds before impact, the pilots either had been incapacitated or lost control of the plane.

== See also ==
- Aeroflot accidents and incidents
- Aeroflot accidents and incidents in the 1970s
