= 1973 Kano Nigeria Airways Boeing 707 crash =

1973 aviation accident in Nigeria

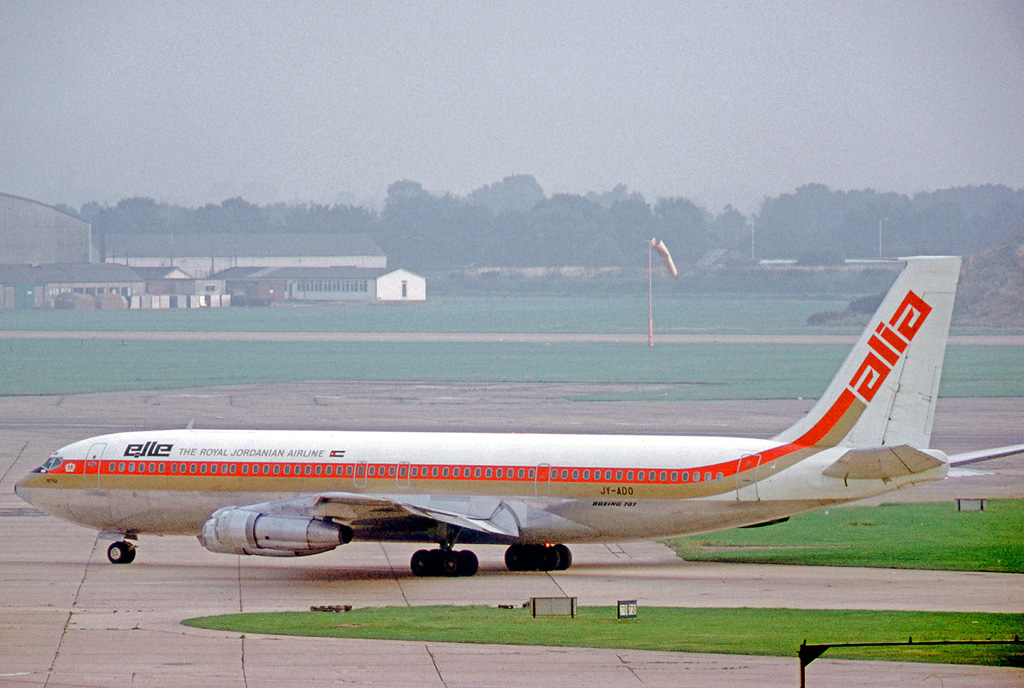
- JY-ADO, the aircraft involved in the accident, seen in 1971

Accident
- Date: 22 January 1973
- Summary: Landing gear collapse, bad weather
- Site: Kano International Airport (KAN), Nigeria; 12°02′58″N 8°31′15″E

Aircraft
- Aircraft type: Boeing 707-3D3C
- Aircraft name: Petra
- Operator: Alia Royal Jordanian Airlines on behalf of Nigeria Airways
- Registration: JY-ADO
- Flight origin: Kandara Airport, Jeddah
- Destination: Ikeja Int'l Airport, Lagos (now Murtala Muhammed Int'l Airport)
- Occupants: 202
- Passengers: 193
- Crew: 9
- Fatalities: 176
- Injuries: 25
- Survivors: 26

On 22 January 1973, a Nigeria Airways Boeing 707 crashed at Kano International Airport while attempting to land in high winds. The crash killed 176 passengers and crew. There were 26 survivors. The crash remains the deadliest aviation disaster ever in Nigeria.

== Aircraft ==
The aircraft involved in the accident was a two-year-old Boeing 707-3D3C, JY-ADO, owned by Alia Royal Jordanian Airlines, operating on behalf of Nigeria Airways. It first flew in 1971 and was powered by four Pratt and Whitney JT3D engines. The Captain of the flight was 53-year-old John Waterman, who had been flying for 22 years in the Middle East and had accumulated 22,000 hours of flying experience.

== Flight ==
A map showing the locations of the Jeddah King Abdulaziz International Airport (JED - where the flight originated), Ikeja International Airport (LOS) and Kano International Airport (KAN - the site of the accident)

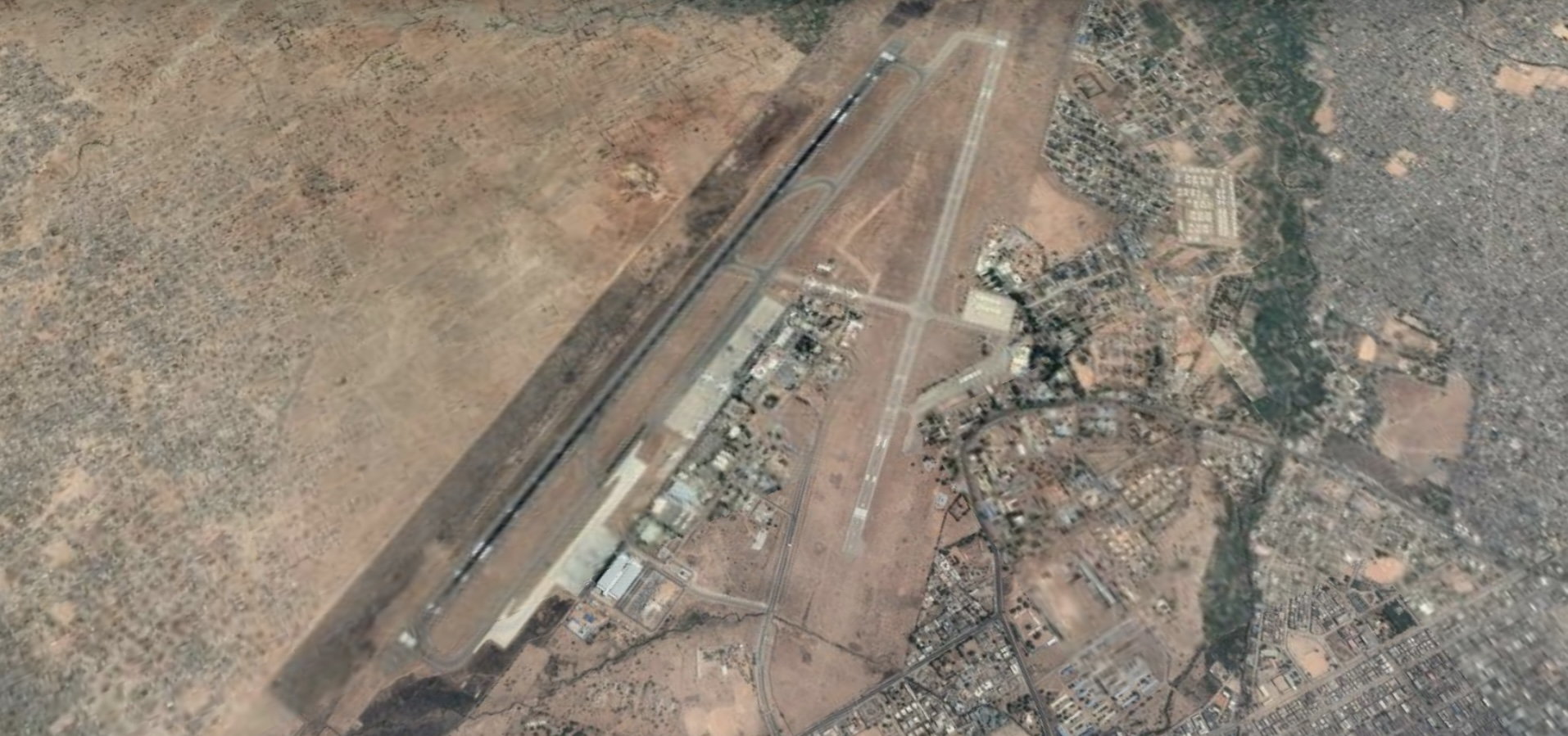
Overview of Kano International Airport, the site of the accident

The Boeing 707, operated by Alia, had been chartered by Nigeria Airways to fly pilgrims back from Jeddah, Saudi Arabia to Lagos, Nigeria. Due to bad weather conditions at Lagos, the pilots had to divert the flight to Kano. The pilots had to make a second landing attempt due to low visibility from haze and a harmattan. Kano International Airport was experiencing high winds at the time. The aircraft landed nose wheel first, and the nose wheel collapsed after hitting a depression in the runway. The right main landing gear leg subsequently collapsed. The aircraft turned 180 degrees, left the runway and burst into flames.

Of the 202 passengers and crew on board, 176 died and 26 survived, including captain Waterman. At the time, the crash surpassed the Aeroflot Flight 217 crash in Russia to become the world's deadliest aviation accident, a distinction it only held for about 14 months until Turkish Airlines Flight 981 crashed in France, killing 346 people. The Kano aircraft crash was also the deadliest aviation disaster involving a Boeing 707 at the time until another Alia Royal Jordanian plane crashed in Morocco two years later, killing all 188 passengers and crew.

== Investigation ==
In 1975, the Nigerian government concluded that the cause of crash was pilot error, stating that captain Waterman flew the aircraft in a reckless manner. According to GeoJournal, the crash was the result of a "mechanical factor". A UK Civil Aviation Authority (CAA) paper published in 2003 references the crash and an assessment that all fatalities were a result of the fire, and reports a "prolonged pause" before evacuation.
