= Fawaz Younis =

Lebanese hijacker

Fawaz Younis (born 1959), also known as Fawaz Yunis and Nazeeh, is a Lebanese hijacker who was arrested in international waters pursuant to an arrest warrant issued in the United States. He was transported to the U.S. and convicted; he was sentenced to 30 years. He was later deported after serving sixteen years of his sentence.

He was born in Lebanon and became an Amal Movement militiaman and then a part of Hezbollah. On June 11, 1985, he led a team that hijacked Royal Jordanian Flight 402 that had two American nationals on board. The Jordanian airliner was sitting on the tarmac at Beirut International Airport when it was stormed by Younis' team. The hijackers forced the flight crew to reveal the identities of the sky marshals to disable them and forced the plane to Tunis. Due to fuel shortage, the flight was diverted to Larnaca, Cyprus. Permission to land at Tunis was refused, so the flight diverted to Palermo. Upon refueling there, the aircraft was flown back to Beirut. In the early morning of June 12, the aircraft took off once more but returned after two hours. After the 13-hour siege, the hijackers released the 70 passengers and blew up the plane. Younis appeared on television as a spokesman for the hijackers.

== Rendition ==
The Comprehensive Crime Control Act of 1984 created a new section in the U.S. Criminal Code for hostage-taking, and the Omnibus Diplomatic Security And Antiterrorism Act of 1986 established a new extraterritorial statute pertaining to terrorist acts conducted abroad against U.S. citizens and interests. Upon approval by the host country, the FBI has the legal authority to deploy FBI personnel to conduct extraterritorial investigations in the host country where the criminal act has been committed, enabling the United States to prosecute terrorists for crimes committed against U.S. citizens.

In September 1987, Younis was lured aboard a yacht in international waters off Cyprus with promises of a drug deal, arrested by the FBI, and flown to Andrews Air Force Base using an S-3 Viking from the aircraft carrier USS Saratoga. He was the first person charged under the new federal hostage-taking statute that gave the U.S. jurisdiction over terrorist acts overseas involving American citizens. He was sentenced to 30 years in a U.S. federal prison.

Fawaz Younis was released by the U.S. government on February 18, 2005, and deported to Lebanon in March 2005 by Immigration and Customs Enforcement, a sub-department of the Homeland Security Department, after having served sixteen years of his sentence.
