= Inezgane Airport =

Airport in Morocco

- IATA: none; ICAO: GMAA

Summary
- Airport type: Public
- Location: Agadir, Morocco
- Elevation AMSL: 89 ft (27 m)
- Coordinates: 30°22′52″N 009°32′46″W

Map
- Location of Inezgane Airport in Morocco

Runways
| Direction | Length | | Surface |
| Direction | m | ft | Surface |
|---|---|---|---|
| 10/28 | 2,910 | 9,547 | Asphalt |
- Source: DAFIF

Inezgane Airport or Agadir Inezgane Airport (ICAO: GMAA) is an airport in Agadir, the capital city of the Souss-Massa region in Morocco. The airport is located approximately 14 km (9 mi) northwest of Agadir's Al Massira Airport. After being replaced by the Al Massira airport for civilian service, it is now a military air base.

== Facilities ==
The airport resides at an elevation of 89 feet (27 m) above mean sea level. It has one runway designated 10/28 with an asphalt surface measuring 2,910 by 45 metres (9,547 ft × 148 ft).

== Accidents ==
On August 3, 1975, an Alia Royal Jordanian Airlines Boeing 707 struck a mountain peak when on approach to Agadir Airport. All 188 passengers and crew on board were killed. It is the worst ever incident involving a 707.

== World War II ==
During World War II, the airport was used by the United States Army Air Forces Air Transport Command as a hub for cargo, transiting aircraft and personnel on the North African Cairo–Dakar transport route for cargo, transiting aircraft and personnel. It functioned as a stopover en route to Marrakesh Menara Airport or to Dakhla Airport, near Villa Cisneros in French North Africa. In addition, an air connection to Atar Airport also handled cargo and personnel flights.

== Civilian service and military air base ==
After the war, Inezgane was the civilian airport of Agadir until 1991, when it was replaced by the new Agadir–Al Massira 20 km southeast of the city. Then it was converted back into a Moroccan military air base.
