= 1975 Agadir Royal Air Maroc Boeing 707 crash =

1975 aviation accident in Agadir, Morocco

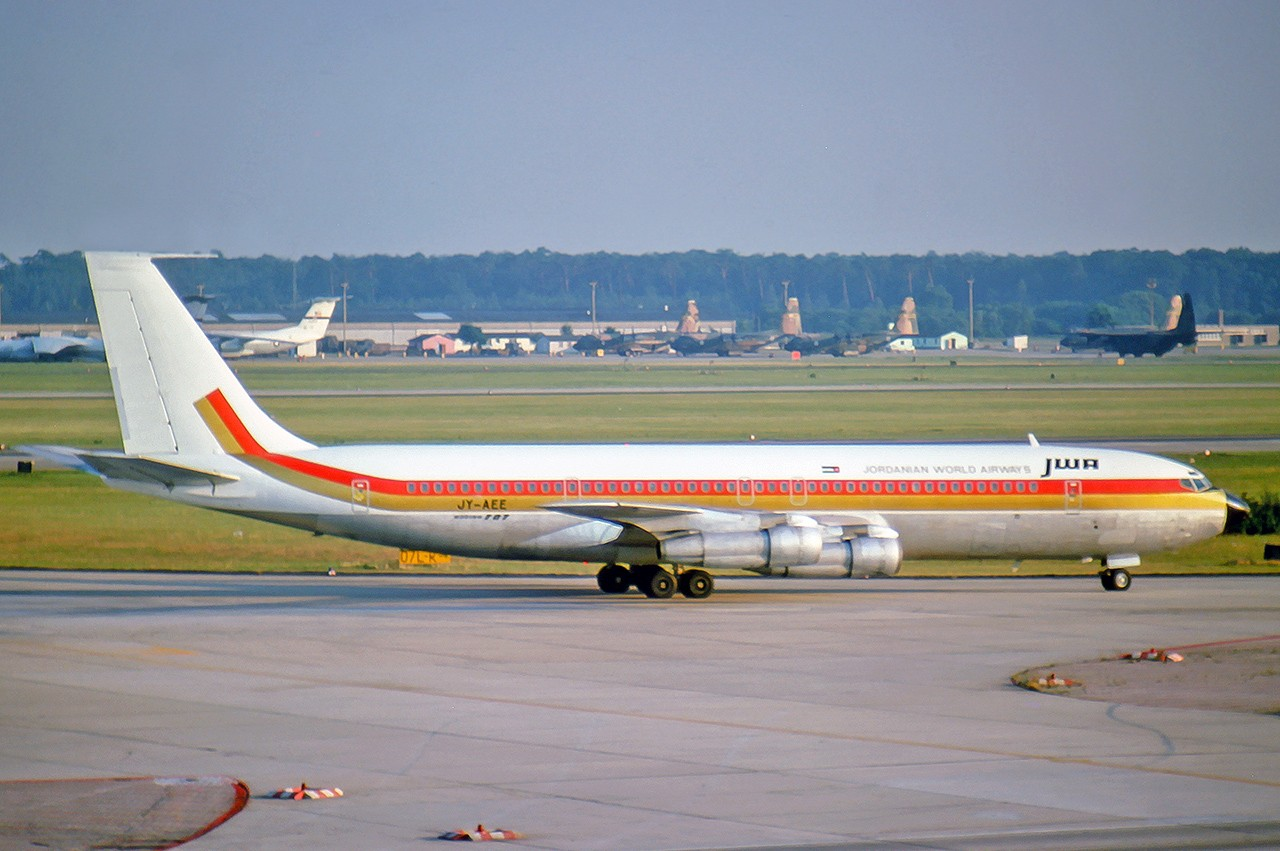
- JY-AEE, the aircraft involved, seen at Frankfurt Airport, the day before the crash

Accident
- Date: August 3, 1975
- Summary: Controlled flight into terrain due to pilot error
- Site: Near Tamri, Morocco; 30°35′13″N 9°24′40″W

Aircraft
- Aircraft type: Boeing 707-321C
- Operator: Alia Royal Jordanian on behalf of Royal Air Maroc
- Registration: JY-AEE
- Flight origin: Le Bourget Airport, Paris, France
- Destination: Inezgane Airport, Agadir, Morocco
- Occupants: 188
- Passengers: 181
- Crew: 7
- Fatalities: 188
- Survivors: 0

On 3 August 1975, a chartered Royal Air Maroc international passenger flight from Paris to Agadir crashed into a mountain while descending to land at Inezgane Airport. All 188 passengers and crew members died. The aircraft involved was a Boeing 707 passenger airliner operated by Alia Royal Jordanian Airlines on behalf of Royal Air Maroc. The accident is the deadliest in Moroccan history and the deadliest involving a Boeing 707, surpassing the Kano air disaster two years before, also involving a chartered Alia Royal Jordanian aircraft.

== Background ==
=== Aircraft ===
The aircraft involved was an 11-year-old Boeing 707-321C registered as JY-AEE. It was equipped with four Pratt & Whitney JT3D-3B turbofan engines. The manufacturing number was 18767/376.

== Flight ==
Nationality	Crew	Passengers	Total
Morocco/France	0	181	181
Morocco	7	0	7
Total	7	181	188

All 181 passengers on board were Moroccan-French nationals. The 707, owned by Alia Royal Jordanian was chartered by the national airline of Morocco, Royal Air Maroc, to fly Moroccan-French workers and their families from France home for the holidays. The flight left Le Bourget Airport in Paris shortly after midnight with 181 passengers and 7 crew members and was scheduled to arrive at its destination about 4:30 a.m. The aircraft approached Agadir in the early hours of the morning at the time of the crash. There was heavy fog in the area and the aircraft was flying from the northeast over the Atlas Mountains. At around 04:25 local time, as the 707 was descending from 8,000 feet (2,400 m) for a runway 29 approach, its right wingtip and no. 4 (outer-right) engine struck a peak about 72 kilometres (45 mi) northeast of Agadir at 700 metres (2,400 ft) altitude. Part of the wing separated. The aircraft lost control and crashed into a valley about 1,800 feet (550 m) below.

Local residents of Imzizen, 50 km (31 mi) northwest of Agadir, had to walk for 19 kilometres (12 mi) to reach a telephone to notify authorities about the crash. Rescue teams arrived by helicopter and found wreckage over a wide area after searching for hours in the thick fog. The extent of the destruction was such that nothing bigger than 1 square metre (10 sq ft) in size was found.

At the time, this was the third-deadliest crash in civil aviation history, behind those of Turkish Airlines Flight 981 and Martinair Flight 138 the previous year.

=== Cause ===
The cause of the crash was determined to be pilot error in not ensuring positive course guidance before beginning descent. The aircraft had not followed the usual north-south corridor generally used for flights to Agadir.
