= Jeffair Barracuda =

Sports monoplane

Barracuda
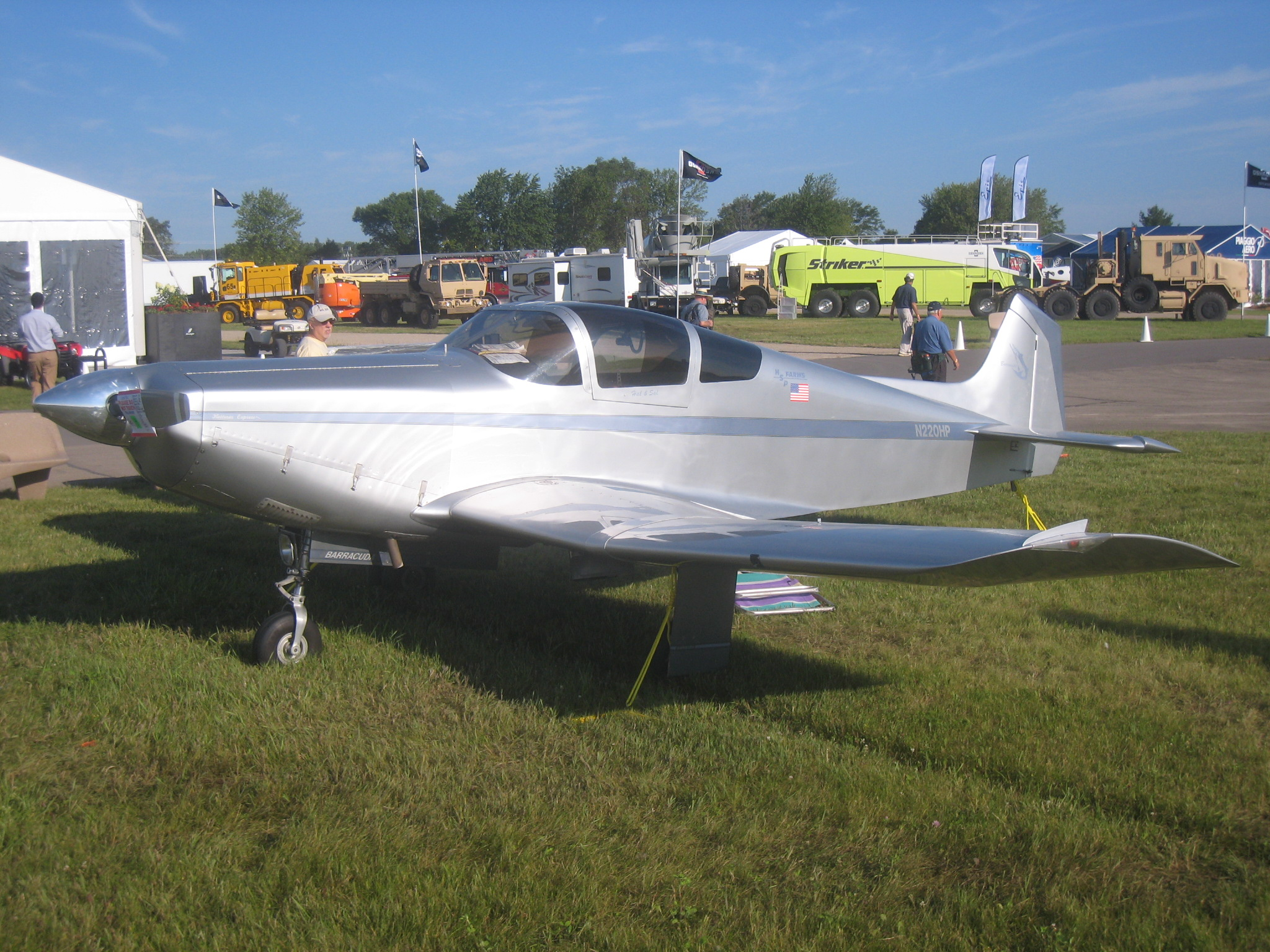

General information
- Type: Sports plane
- National origin: United States
- Manufacturer: Jeffair for homebuilding
- Designer: Geoffrey Siers

History
- First flight: 29 June 1975

The Jeffair Barracuda is a high-performance sporting monoplane that was developed in the United States in the 1970s and is marketed for homebuilding. Designed and built by Geoffrey Siers, the prototype won the prize for "Most Outstanding New Design" at the EAA Fly-in in 1976. It was a low-wing cantilever monoplane of wooden construction with retractable tricycle undercarriage and side-by-side seating for two. Around 150 sets of plans had sold by 1977.

== Development ==
Geoffrey Siers was a former RAF pilot and engineer for Boeing in 1967. He set out to design an aircraft that was fast, aerobatic, two place, and had range to fly long cross-country flights. The aircraft was refined after a full size cockpit mockup was made. The lightweight construction of the plywood-covered wooden de Havilland Mosquito was the inspiration for the materials choice. The retractable landing gear came from a Piper PA-24 Comanche. The wings were a three-piece design

== Operational history ==
Test flights were performed in 1975. The aircraft takes off at 70 mph (113 km/h) and climbs at 2000 feet per minute (10.2 m/s). Full flap stalls were recorded as low as 54 mph (87 km/h).

== Specifications ==
Data from Jane's All the World's Aircraft 1982–83

General characteristics

- Crew: 2
- Length: 21 ft 6 in (6.55 m)
- Wingspan: 24 ft 9 in (7.54 m)
- Wing area: 120 sq ft (11 m^{2})
- Airfoil: NACA 64_{2}415
- Empty weight: 1,495 lb (678 kg)
- Max takeoff weight: 2,300 lb (1,043 kg)
- Fuel capacity: 44 US gal (37 imp gal; 170 L)
- Powerplant: 1 × Lycoming O-540-E4B5 , 260 hp (190 kW)
- Propellers: 3-bladed Hartzell constant-speed propeller, 7 ft 2 in (2.18 m) diameter

Performance

- Maximum speed: 218 mph (351 km/h, 189 kn) at 7,000 ft (2,100 m)
- Cruise speed: 180 mph (290 km/h, 160 kn) at 9,000 ft (2,700 m) (62% power)
- Stall speed: 62 mph (100 km/h, 54 kn) (flaps down)
- Never exceed speed: 300 mph (480 km/h, 260 kn)
- Range: 450 mi (720 km, 390 nmi) at 65% power, 30 min reserves
- Rate of climb: 2,500 ft/min (13 m/s)
