= Royal Jordanian =

Flag carrier airline of Jordan

Royal Jordanian الملكيَّة الأردنيَّة Al-Malakiyyah al-'Urduniyyah

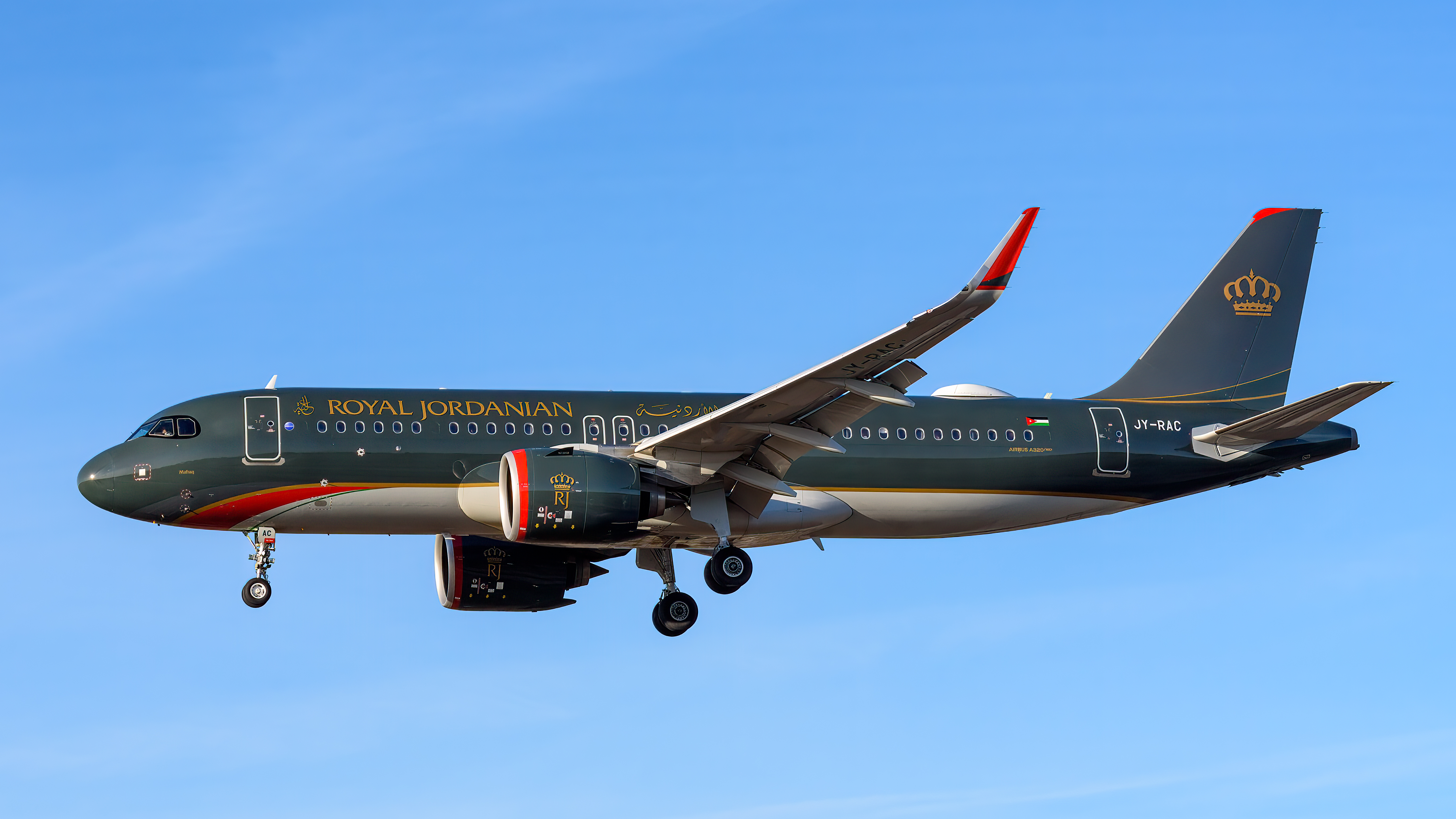
- A Royal Jordanian Airbus A320neo
IATA	ICAO	Call sign
RJ	RJA	JORDANIAN
- Founded: 9 December 1963; 62 years ago (as Alia Airlines – Royal Jordanian Airlines)
- Hubs: Amman–Queen Alia
- Focus cities: Aqaba–King Hussein
- Frequent-flyer program: Royal Club
- Alliance: Oneworld
- Subsidiaries: Jordan Airports Company (90%); Royal Jordanian Cargo; Royal Jordanian Ground Handling; Royal Tours; Tikram
- Fleet size: 40
- Destinations: 51
- Headquarters: Amman, Jordan
- Key people: Samer Majali (vice chairman & CEO); Saeed Darwazeh (chairman)
- Website: www.rj.com

Royal Jordanian Airlines (formerly known as Alia Royal Jordanian Airlines) is the flag carrier of Jordan with its head office in the capital, Amman. The airline operates scheduled international services over four continents from its main base at Queen Alia International Airport, with over 500 flights per week and at least 110 daily departures. It joined the Oneworld airline alliance in 2007.

== History ==
=== 1960s to 1990s ===
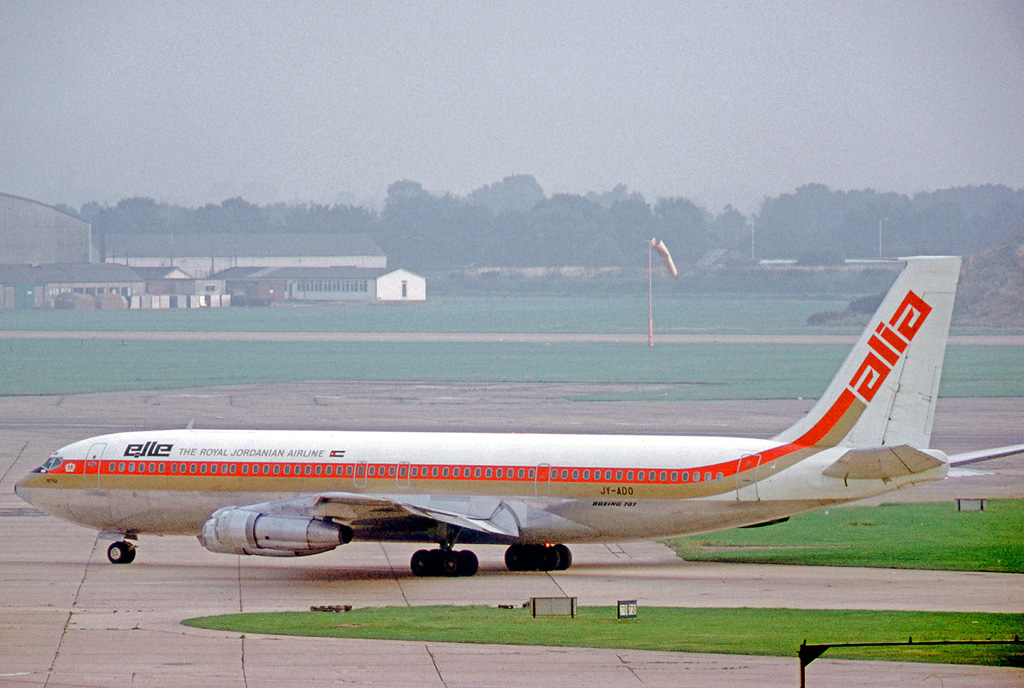
Alia Boeing 707-300 at London Heathrow in 1971. This aircraft was later destroyed in the Kano air disaster.

The airline was established on 9 December 1963 and started operations on 15 December 1963 after a royal decree by the late King Hussein. It was named Alia (or Aalya) after King Hussein's eldest child, Princess Alia bint Al Hussein of Jordan (born on 13 February 1956), not the King's third wife, Queen Alia, whom he married in 1972. The airline was founded with capital from private shareholders but the Jordanian government later took over the company.

Alia (the Royal Jordanian Airline) started operations with two Handley Page Dart Heralds and a Douglas DC-7 aircraft, serving Kuwait City, Beirut and Cairo from Amman. In 1964, another DC-7 was added and service began to Jeddah. In 1965, Alia initiated service to Rome, its first destination in Europe. The progress made by the airline was threatened by an Israeli air raid during the 1967 Six-Day War when the DC-7 aircraft were destroyed. They were replaced by two Fokker F27s.

In 1968, the airline introduced the Sud Aviation Caravelle, and expanded the route network to Nicosia, Benghazi, Dhahran and Doha. 1969 saw the addition of service to Munich, Istanbul and Tehran.

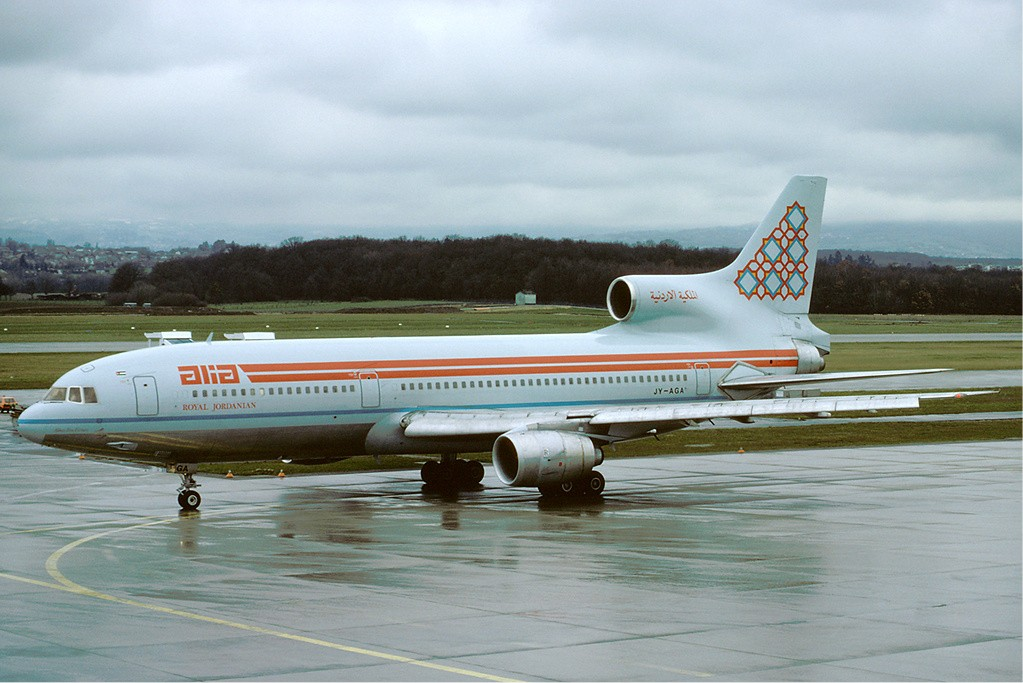
Lockheed L-1011 TriStar of Alia in the short-lived, experimental early-1980s livery

In 1970, Alia phased out the F27s and ordered Boeing 707s. Frankfurt and Abu Dhabi were added to the network. The 707s were delivered in 1971. In that year, service was initiated to Madrid, Copenhagen and Karachi. During the rest of the decade, Boeing 720s, Boeing 727s and Boeing 747s were added to the fleet. A catering department was established, and duty-free shops were opened at Amman airport. Services were added to Bahrain, Dubai, Muscat, Rabat, Geneva, Amsterdam, Baghdad, Bangkok, Vienna, Damascus, New York City, Houston, and Ras Al Khaimah. In 1979, Alia became a founding member of the Arab Airlines Technical Consortium.

In the 1980s, Tunis and Tripoli joined the route map, and Alia's IBM computer center was inaugurated. Lockheed L-1011 Tristars, Airbus A310s and Airbus A320s joined the fleet. In December 1986, Alia changed its name to Royal Jordanian Airlines after Princess Alia sought a divorce. The airline's first woman pilot was hired service in the 1980s. Service was added to Belgrade, Chicago, Los Angeles, Miami, Bucharest, Singapore, Riyadh, Kuala Lumpur (in cooperation with Malaysia Airlines), Sanaa, Moscow. Montreal, Delhi, Calcutta and Ankara. The Gabriel Automated Ticket System – (GATS) was also inaugurated at this time.

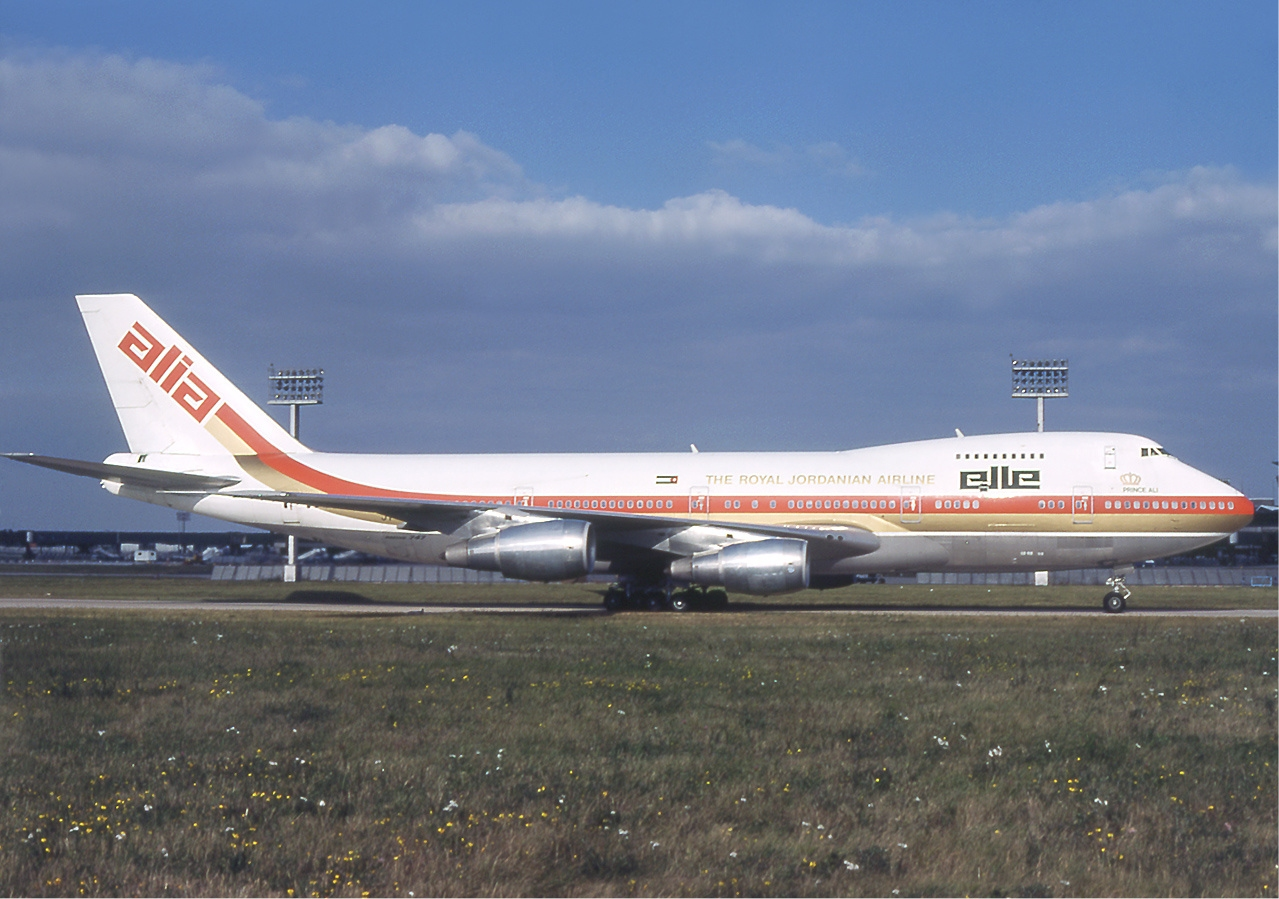
A Boeing 747-200 of the airline as seen in 1978

In the 1990s, Royal Jordanian and nine other Arab air carriers signed up for the Galileo CRS. The IMCS maintenance and engineering system was added, a new Amman city air terminal was opened at the 7th Circle of the Jordanian capital, and services to Rafah started, since then halted. The cities of Toronto, Colombo, Jakarta, Berlin, Mumbai, Milan and Tel Aviv were added to the network. In November 1997, Royal Jordanian became a code-sharing partner with the US carrier Trans World Airlines and moved operations into the TWA Flight Center (Terminal 5) at the John F. Kennedy International Airport in New York.

=== From 2000 ===
In 2000, the U.S. Federal Aviation Administration (FAA) renewed the airline's maintenance and engineering department's license. The duty-free shop was among the services to be privatised. A holding company, RJI, wholly owned by the government, was incorporated as a public limited company in February 2001 to hold all the airlines and associated investments. The airline's name was changed on 5 February 2001 to Alia – The Royal Jordanian Airlines Company.

The flag carrier's subsidiary Royal Wings operated an Airbus A320-212 aircraft on both scheduled and charter services to destinations in Egypt, Cyprus, and Israel.

On 20 December 2006, Royal Jordanian announced that two Airbus A321s would be replaced with two new units, and four new Airbus A319s would enter service in early 2008.

In April 2007, Royal Jordanian became part of Oneworld. It was the first Arab airline to join a global airline alliance. The following month, the airline announced an order for a total of 10 Boeing 787s, for service entry in 2010. This was the first order Royal Jordanian has placed with Boeing.

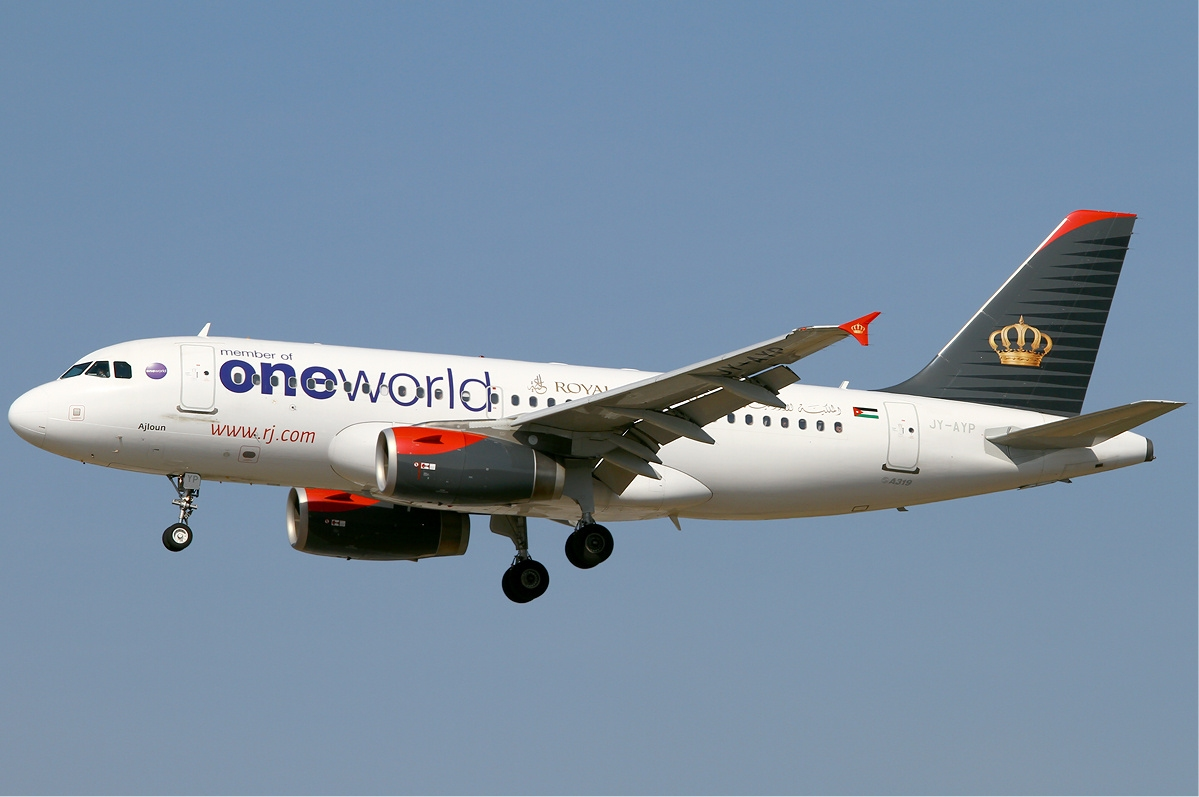
An Airbus A319-100 in oneworld livery

Montreal was re-added to the network on 25 May 2007, after the route was cancelled in 1997. Also during May, Royal Jordanian was the sponsor of the World Economic Forum, which was held at the Dead Sea, Jordan.

On 11 July 2007, Royal Jordanian celebrated thirty years of non-stop service between Amman and New York City, making it the longest-serving Arab airline to this gateway to the U.S. RJ won the "Airline Strategy Award" in the technology category at the sixth annual Airline Strategy Awards on 16 July 2007. On 23 July, RJ saw the introduction of cargo flights, Damascus being the first destination served from Amman, using a Boeing 737.

Royal Jordanian made its first flight to Budapest, on 28 July, using an Embraer E195. In October, RJ announced the switch of two Embraer E195 jets of its original order to two Embraer E175 jets. Royal Jordanian opened a new lounge at King Hussein International Airport in Aqaba.

RJ will be the first Middle East airline to provide its passengers with OnAir's in-flight Internet and mobile phone services, including e-mail, SMS and voice calls. Royal Jordanian has upgraded its three Airbus A310s at a cost of over 10 million Jordanian dinars (JOD).

Royal Jordanian was privatized at the end of 2007, resulting in 71% of its assets being sold. The market capitalization of the company stands at 260 million JOD, and share-trading commenced on 17 December 2007.

On 24 December 2007, Royal Jordanian confirmed Baku as one of its new destinations for 2008, using an Embraer E195 twice weekly from Amman. In early 2008, however, RJ officials decided against the new route, citing that high fuel prices and a new market were a risk too large to take at that time. Royal Jordanian plans to operate the Amman-Baku route in late 2009 or early 2010. On 22 January 2008, RJ launched flights to Hong Kong via Bangkok, with three flights/week during winter, and five flights/week during summer, making it the airline's first route to China.

The Airbus A319 entered service on 13 March 2008, making RJ the first Middle East airline to operate three aircraft of the Airbus A320 family. On 17 August 2008, Royal Jordanian opened a new route to Kyiv, using Embraer E195 jets for this twice-weekly service. On 24 August 2008, Royal Jordanian opened its new lounge at Queen Alia International Airport Amman, replacing the "Petra" and "Jerash" lounges. The new lounge is located on the second floor of the South Terminal and is the second-largest airport lounge in the Middle East, being able to handle over 340 passengers.

The airline recorded an 18% increase in passenger numbers in July 2008. With the airline transporting 278,000 passengers, the seat factor grew by 5% in that month to reach 81%. As part of Royal Jordanian's commitment to its airline alliance Oneworld, an announcement was made at the alliance's 10th birthday celebrations on 3 February 2009 that RJ would paint its new A319 (due for delivery in late March) in a scheme that would be based around the Oneworld name and logo. This is the first special colour scheme Royal Jordanian will have used.

Royal Jordanian resumed service to Brussels on 1 April 2009, six years after the route was discontinued by the airline, flying twice weekly from Amman with the airline planning to add a further two flights per week later in 2009.

On 28 March 2010, Royal Jordanian inaugurated regular direct flights to Madinah Munawwarah, Saudi Arabia, with four weekly flights. On the 23 March, Royal Jordanian confirmed that it had ordered two A330-200s and one Embraer E175. Royal Jordanian recommenced operations to Malaysia's capital Kuala Lumpur on June 2, 2010, after it had suspended this route in 2004. Aircraft used on this route is the new Airbus A330-200 and later switched to Boeing 787 Dreamliner.

In May 2011, Royal Jordanian announced that they will retire the Airbus A310 aircraft in December 2011, and January 2012. Royal Jordanian uses an Airbus A330 and an Airbus A321 for non-stop flights to London (Heathrow Terminal 3).

In June 2014, Royal Jordanian announced that it had suspended services to Mosul in northern Iraq due to the capture of the airport by the Islamic State.

The first of Royal Jordanian's Boeing 787s (267-seat, two-class configuration) entered service in September 2014, initially linking Amman with Jeddah, Saudi Arabia. The 787 Dreamliner is Royal Jordanian's first Boeing aircraft since the 707s and 747s, and replaced the Airbus A340-200s which had reached the end of their lives. The Dreamliners have replaced the Airbus A330-200s as leases on those aircraft have expired. The Dreamliners are generally used on Royal Jordanian's Far East destinations, to London and North America.

In May 2017, Royal Jordanian announced the appointment of Stefan Pichler, the ex-CEO of Air Berlin, Fiji Airways, Jazeera Airways, Virgin Australia and Thomas Cook as the new president and CEO. Pichler developed a turnaround plan which helped moving Royal Jordanian back into profitability by the end of 2017. In this context, the airline cancelled the order of the 8th Dreamliner and also withdrew the A330F from its Cargo fleet for similar reasons. The CEO also stated that the strategy of Royal Jordanian would lead to a single type narrow-body fleet, not mentioning whether it will be Airbus, Boeing, Bombardier, or Embraer. In September 2020, Pichler resigned from his duties which were taken over by Chairman Saeed Samih Darwazah.

On 17 January 2025, the airline announced the re-introduction of direct flights between Amman and Damascus commencing 31 January 2025, following a hiatus of 13 years. The service will operate four weekly flights with daily flights to begin in April 2025. Royal Jordanian join Qatar Airways, Turkish Airlines and a wider range of regional airlines to resume flight operations to Syria.

== Corporate affairs ==
=== Head office ===
As of 2009, Haddadinco Engineering Company for Contracting is building the new Royal Jordanian head office in Amman. The building was designed by Niels Torp. The new building was completed in late 2011, and RJ employees began work in the building on January 3, 2012. In the 1960s, Alia's head office was in the Mango Building in Amman.

=== Rivalry ===
Royal Jordanian began to put into place a new strategy at the end of 2002, which saw the airline concentrate on its neighboring nations with increased frequencies. In a plan to establish itself as the Middle East's "regional airline", it began to add smaller routes such as Alexandria in Egypt to Aleppo in Syria which the bigger airlines, such as Emirates, would not undertake with the larger aircraft compared to Royal Jordanian's regional jets. As of the end of 2008, the plan had proven successful for the airline, with its main rivals being Middle East Airlines and Egypt Air.

=== Business figures ===
The key trends for Royal Jordanian are (as at the financial year ending December 31):

Financial and operational statistics
Year	Profit/loss (JOD m)	Employees	Passengers (m)	Seat factor	Fleet size	Sources
2002	3.0	3,008	1.3	66%		
2003	9.7	3,162	1.4	68%		
2004	15.3	3,313	1.7	71%		
2005	20.5	3,557	1.8	69%		
2006	6.1	3,799	2.0	66%		
2007	24.1	4,275	2.2	71%		
2008	23.4	4,507	2.7	72%		
2009	28.6	4,399	2.6	68%		
2010	9.6	4,700	3.0	71%		
2011	−57.9	4,545	3.1	69%		
2012	1.1	4,541	3.3	73%	29	
2013	−38.8	4,643	3.3	70%	32	
2014	−39.6	4,543	3.2	70%	28	
2015	16.0	4,394	2.9	67%	27	
2016	−24.5	4,185	3.0	65%	26	
2017	0.27	4,135	3.1	71%	26	
2018	−5.8	4,054	3.2	73.8%	26	
2019	10.3	4,018	3.3	74.2%	27	
2020	−161	3,599	0.75	65.4%	23	
2021	−74.2	3,437	1.6	67.9%	24	
2022	−78.8	3,913	3.0	77%	27	
2023	−8.5	3,913	3.6	78%	30	
2024	-3.5	4,071	3.7	82%	28	

== Destinations ==
=== Codeshare agreements ===
Royal Jordanian codeshares with the following airlines:

- American Airlines
- British Airways
- Etihad Airways
- Gulf Air
- ITA Airways
- Malaysia Airlines
- Oman Air
- Qatar Airways
- TAROM
- Turkish Airlines

== Fleet ==
=== Current fleet ===
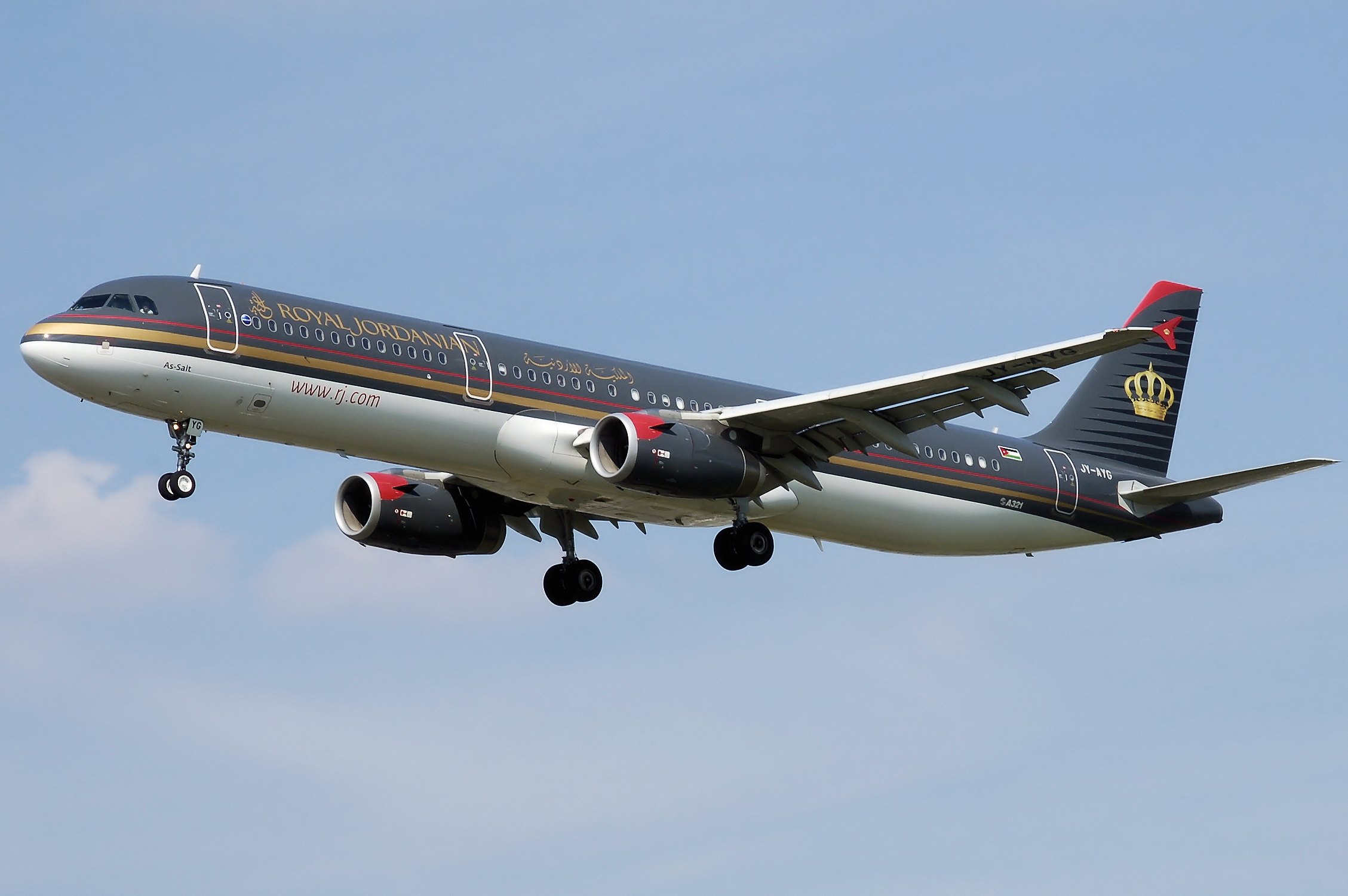
Royal Jordanian Airbus A321-200

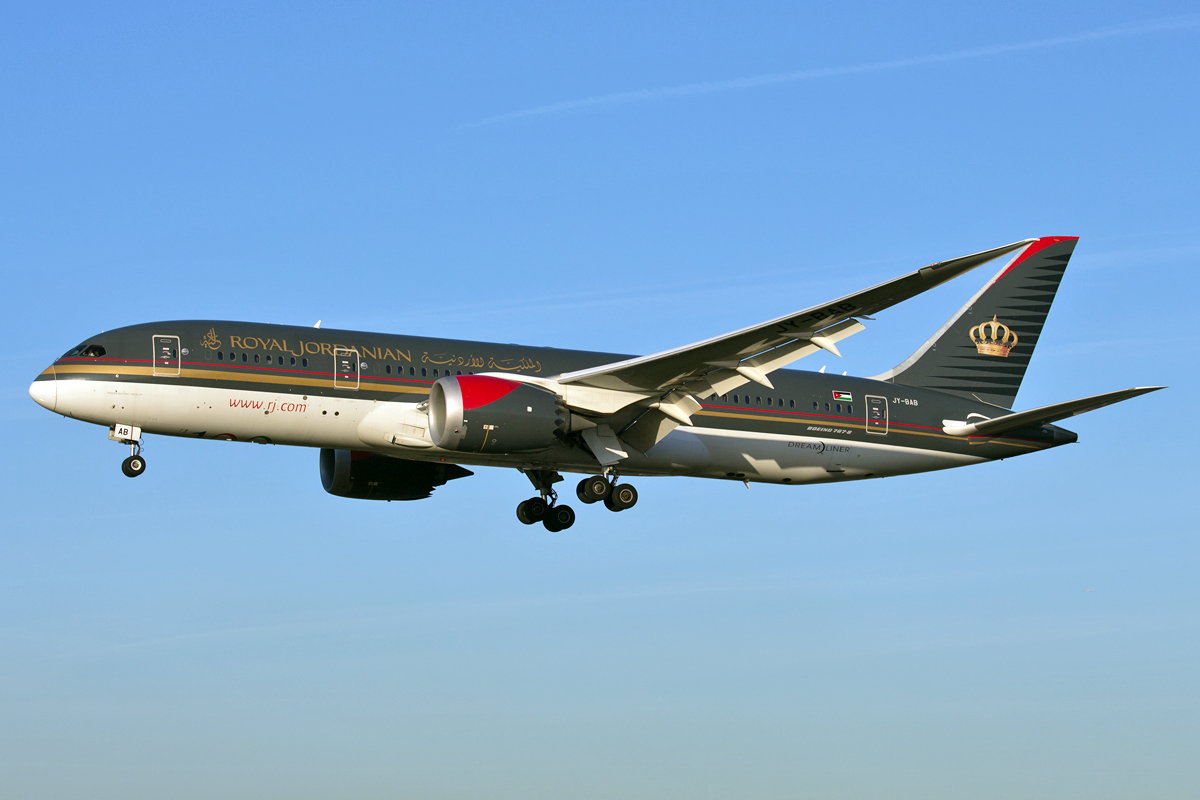
Royal Jordanian Boeing 787-8

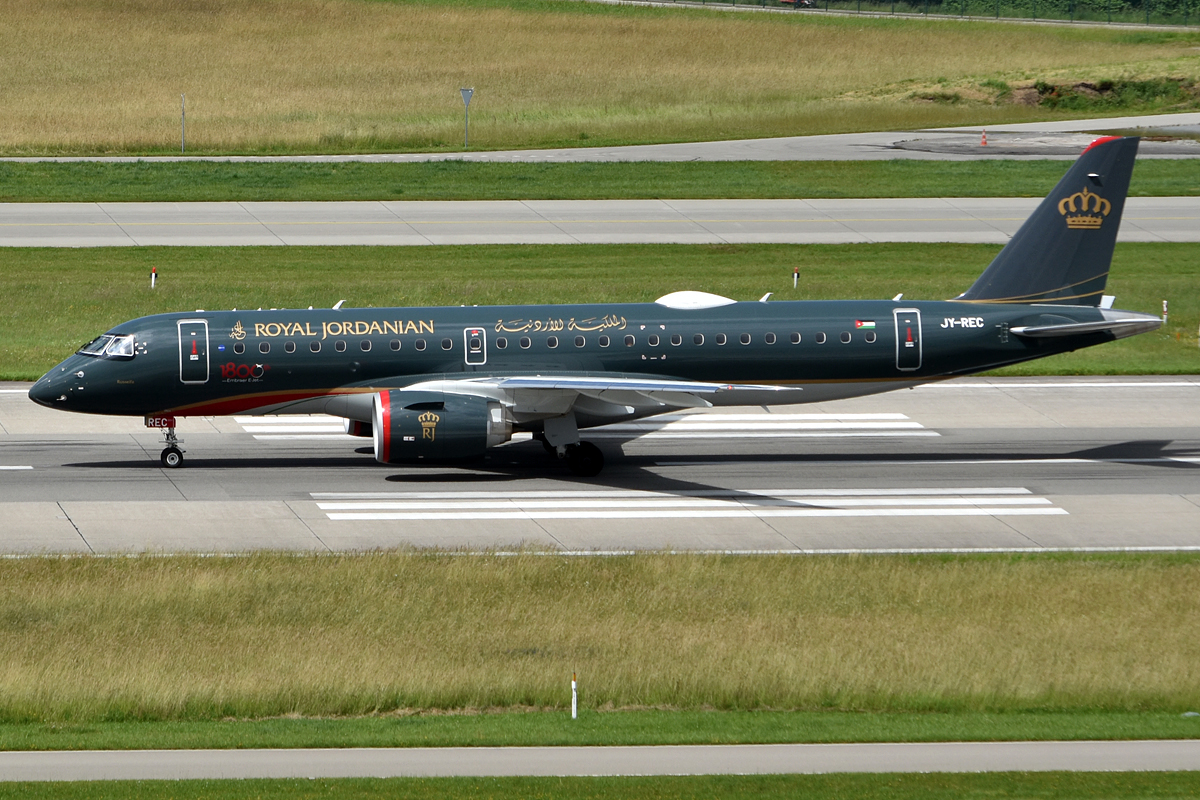
Royal Jordanian Embraer 190-E2

As of August 2025, the Royal Jordanian fleet consists of the following aircraft:

Royal Jordanian fleet
Aircraft	In service	Orders	Passengers			Notes
Aircraft	In service	Orders	J	Y	Total	Notes
Airbus A320-200	7	—	12	138	150	
Airbus A321-200	2	—	20	142	162	
Airbus A320neo	10	9	—	180	180	Order of 20 with neither variant breakdown nor whether the aircraft are leased or direct manufacturer orders yet revealed. First 8 A320neos leased from Avolon.
Airbus A321neo	1	9	12	177	189	Order of 20 with neither variant breakdown nor whether the aircraft are leased or direct manufacturer orders yet revealed. First 8 A320neos leased from Avolon.
Boeing 787-8	7	—	24	246	270	JY-BAH painted in Discover Petra livery.
Boeing 787-9	1	5	32	280	312	
Embraer E175	2	—	12	60	72	To be retired and replaced by Embraer E2. No longer in the fleet list
Embraer E195	1	—	12	92	104	To be retired and replaced by Embraer E2. No longer in the fleet list
Embraer E190-E2	4	—	12	82	94	Deliveries began Q4 2023.
Embraer E195-E2	4	—	12	110	122	Deliveries began Q4 2023.
Royal Jordanian Cargo fleet
Airbus A321-200/P2F	1	—	Cargo			
Total	40	14				

=== Former fleet ===
Royal Jordanian previously operated the following aircraft types:

Royal Jordanian retired fleet
Aircraft	Total	Introduced	Retired	Notes
Airbus A310-200	2	1999	2000	
Airbus A310-300	11	1987	2012	
Airbus A319-100	7	2008	2024	
Airbus A330-200	3	2010	2017	
Airbus A340-200	4	2002	2014	
Boeing 707-320C	14	1976	1996	
Boeing 720B	2	1972	1983	
Boeing 727-200	7	1974	1990	JY-ADU written off as Alia Royal Jordanian Flight 600.
Boeing 747-200	2	1977	1989	
Bombardier Q400	2	2005	2008	
Douglas DC-6	1	1966	1972	
Douglas DC-7	21	1963	1967	
Fokker F27 Friendship	2	1967	1969	
Fokker F28 Fellowship	1	2000	2007	
Handley Page Dart Herald	2	1964	1965	
Lockheed L-1011 TriStar 500	5	1981	1999	
Sud Aviation Caravelle 10B	3	1965	1975	
Vickers Viscount	5	1961	1967	

=== Livery ===
From 1963 to 1986, the original livery of Royal Jordanian Airlines consisted of a white fuselage with both red and gold cheatlines.

In December 1986, the airline changed its name from Alia Royal Jordanian Airlines to simply Royal Jordanian Airlines, which coincided the arrival of Airbus A310 and Airbus A320 airliners. The new livery consisted of a charcoal grey fuselage with the same red and gold cheatlines, similar to the earlier version. The tail consists of a golden crown with a red tip on the charcoal grey coloured aircraft tail.

In January 2024, Royal Jordanian unveiled its updated livery, with slight changes to the colour layout on the tail section, as well as the addition of the logo on the aircraft's belly. It was first unveiled on the airline's first Embraer E2, registered JY-REA.

The airline's new Airbus A320neo aircraft, as well as the Boeing 787-9, will feature the same updated livery.

=== Special color schemes ===
Until 2009, Royal Jordanian had never had an aircraft painted in a special colour scheme. It announced at the 10th birthday celebrations in February 2009 of the airline alliance Oneworld that it would paint its new A319 due for delivery in late March in a special scheme, which would be based around the Oneworld name and logo. The aircraft, registration JY-AYP, has its fuselage painted white, with the tailfin and engines in normal Royal Jordanian colours. "A member of Oneworld" in prominent lettering is located at the front of the aircraft, with the usual title "Royal Jordanian" further back. However, the aircraft was stored in October 2024 and subsequently retired by the airline.

In October 2021, Royal Jordanian unveiled "Discover Petra" special livery on one of its Boeing 787 Dreamliners, registered JY-BAH.

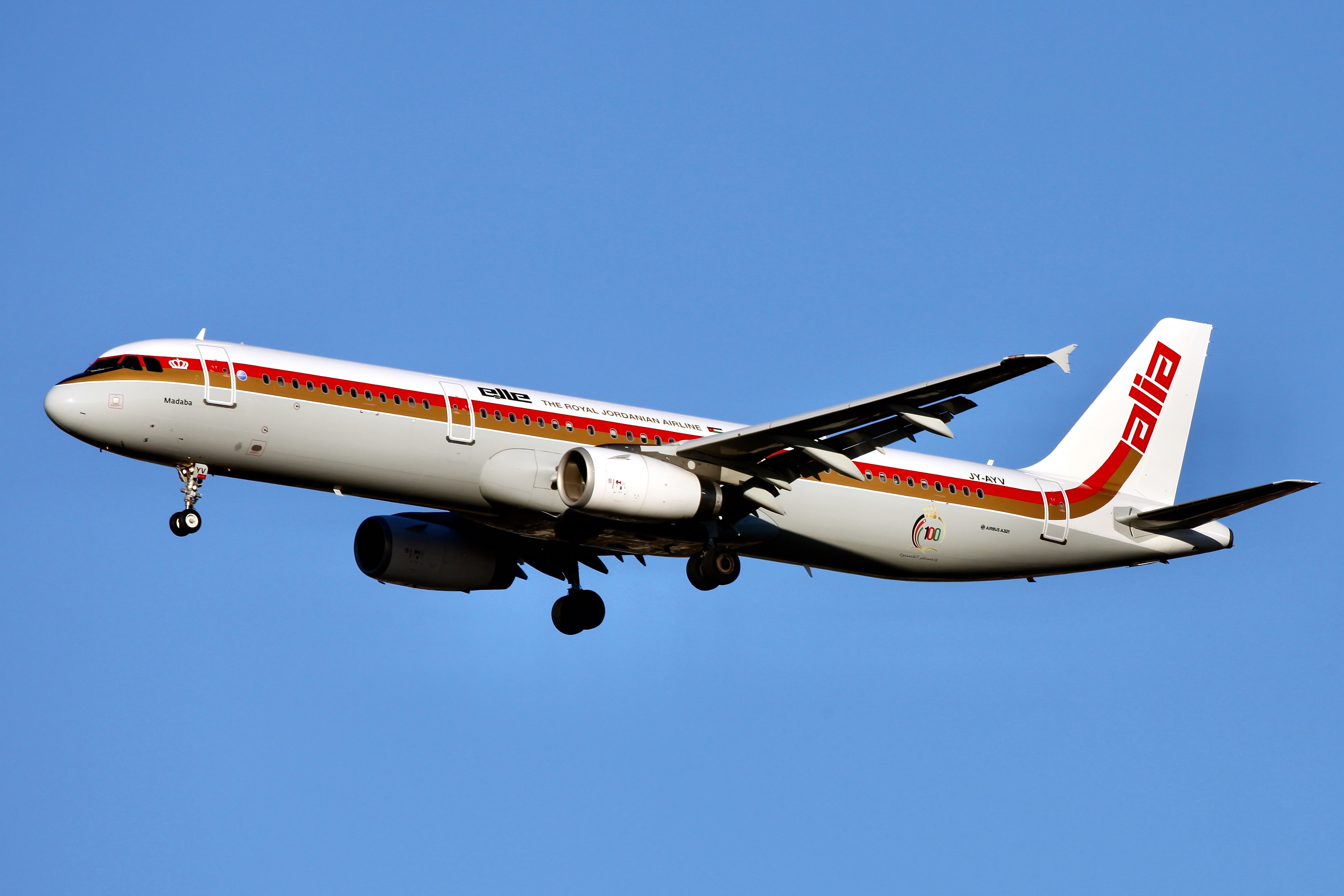
Royal Jordanian Airbus A321-200 in the retro livery

A month later, in November 2021, the airline revealed an Airbus A321, JY-AYV, in its retro "Alia" livery. The aircraft's first flight in the new paint scheme was to London Heathrow.

== Services ==
=== Catering ===
Food and drinks served on flights leaving Amman are provided by Dnata. Hot meals will be served on a flight of at least three hours in length. If the flight is shorter than one hour, the cabin crew will provide snacks and drinks throughout, or before, the flight. These flights include those to Tel Aviv, Cairo, Baghdad, Beirut and Aqaba from Amman.

=== In-flight entertainment ===
Royal Jordanian's onboard entertainment system is called "Sky Cinema".

- In Economy Class on board the Airbus and Boeing aircraft, all passengers are supplied with personal televisions (PTV), the system is audio- and video-on-demand system (AVOD). The system provides passengers with a selection of movies, television shows, audio and games.
- In Crown Class, passengers are provided with AVOD which includes a large library of movies, television shows, audio and games on board the Airbus and Boeing aircraft. Portable entertainment devices (IMS) are only available for Crown Class passengers flying on Embraer aircraft. The IMS service is provided on all international flights. The IMS library contains movies, short subjects, an audio library and games.

Interactive games are available in all classes on all flights, as well as news provided by CNN on all flights. On very short flights (from Amman to Tel Aviv, Beirut or Damascus), the AVOD system is turned on but there is only the selection of games, CNN News, the "Flight Show", and the comedy channel. This is due to the flights being less than 45 minutes hence movies/shows would not be complete upon arrival.

=== Seating ===
Crown Class seats on Boeing 787s are fully flat beds. Seat pitch is 83 inches on the Dreamliners and 46 inches on the short and medium haul aircraft. In Economy Class, Royal Jordanian offers 32-inch seat pitch on board its Embraer aircraft, whilst it offers 34-inch seat pitch on board its Airbus aircraft. All Royal Jordanian Economy class seats also offer a foot-rest.

=== Crown Class lounges ===
Crown Class passengers can use lounges across the world including all Oneworld member airline lounges. As of August 2008, Royal Jordanian operates two lounges: one in Amman, at Queen Alia International Airport, and one at Aqaba, at King Hussein International Airport. In August 2008, Royal Jordanian opened its new lounge, which can handle over 340 passengers. It is located in the South Terminal on the second floor and replaces the previous Jerash and Petra lounges in the airport.

=== Frequent-flyer program ===
Royal Club is Royal Jordanian's frequent flyer program. Passengers are awarded miles based on the type, class of flight and destination. Royal Club members can also get miles by traveling on other Oneworld airlines. Card holders of Royal Jordanian's Royal Plus with either Silver, Gold or Platinum can use Oneworld airport services across the world while Gold and Platinum also have lounge access.

== Accidents and incidents ==
Royal Jordanian has experienced 13 aviation occurrences and six hijackings throughout its history, four of them fatal. The airline's two worst accidents, both involving chartered Boeing 707s, happened in Nigeria in 1973 and Morocco in 1975.

- On April 10, 1965, all 54 passengers and crew aboard an ALIA Handley Page HPR-7 Herald 207 died after their plane crashed into a mountain near Damascus, Syria as a result of a structural failure of the fuselage in flight.
- On January 22, 1973, 176 people were killed when an ALIA Boeing 707 was landing at Kano, Nigeria.
- On August 3, 1975, all 188 people on board were killed when an ALIA Boeing 707 struck a mountain ridge while making its approach for a landing in Morocco.
- On March 14, 1979, 45 of the 64 persons aboard an ALIA Boeing 727 were killed as a result of a windshear on landing at Doha International Airport in Qatar.
- On June 11, 1985, Fawaz Younis and four Amal Movement men hijacked Flight 402, a Boeing 727, forcing the plane to and from Beirut and Jordan. 13 hours later, after releasing the passengers, the hijackers blew up the plane.

Since the name of the carrier was changed to Royal Jordanian Airlines in 1986, the only fatal incident was when a hijacker, seeking political asylum, was killed by the on-board security agent on 5 July 2000, on board a Royal Jordanian Airbus A320 flying from Amman to Damascus.
