= List of Lockheed L-1011 operators =

The following is a list of past and present commercial operators and past military operators of the Lockheed L-1011:

== Commercial operators ==
Airline	Country	1/100/200	500	Notes	References
ADC Airlines	Nigeria	1			
Aer Lingus	Ireland	4			
Aeroperú	Peru	3			
Air America	USA	7		Ceased operations in 1990	
Air Atlanta Icelandic	Iceland	11			
Air Canada	Canada	12	6		
Air France	France	2		Leased from Air Transat and from American Trans Air	
Air India	India		3	Leased from Caribjet	
Air Lanka	Sri Lanka	12	4		
Air Rum	Sierra Leone	5			
Air Transat	Canada	16	6		
Air Universal	Jordan	2			
All Nippon Airways	Japan	21			
American International Airways	USA	10			
Arrow Air	USA	3			
ATA Airlines	USA	23	6		
Barq Aviation	Jordan	2	3	Ceased operations in 2016	
Blue Scandinavia	Sweden	1			
British Airtours	UK	8	2	Rebranded as Caledonian Airways in 1988	
British Airways	UK	18	8		
BWIA West Indies Airways	Trinidad and Tobago		5		
Caledonian Airways	UK	10			
Caribjet	Antigua and Barbuda		3		
Cathay Pacific	Hong Kong	19			
Chile Inter	Chile	2		Leased from Royal Aviation; Ceased operations in 1999	
Classic Airways	UK	2		Ceased operations in 1998	
Court Line	UK	2		Ceased operations in 1974	
Delta Air Lines	USA	53	17		
Dragonair	Hong Kong	3		Leased from Cathay Pacific	
Eastern Air Lines	USA	44		Launch customer Ceased operations in 1991	
EuroAtlantic Airways	Portugal		1		
Faucett Perú	Peru	4		Ceased operations in 1997	
Fine Air	USA	4		Became Arrow Air in 2002	
Five Star Airlines	USA	2			
Garuda Indonesia	Indonesia	1	1	L-1011-500 leased from Royal Jordanian	
Globe Jet	Lebanon	1	4	Ceased operations in 2007	
Gulf Air	Bahrain	13			
Hawaiian Airlines	USA	8			
Hewa Bora Airways	DRC	1	1		
Holiday Airlines	Turkey	1			
Iberia	Spain	1		Leased from Aer Turas and Air Atlanta Icelandic	
Istanbul Airlines	Turkey	2		Leased from Air Atlanta Icelandic	
Kampuchea Airlines	Cambodia	9			
LAM Mozambique Airlines	Mozambique		1	Leased from TAP Air Portugal	
Lignes Aériennes Congolaises	DRC	1		Never used in service	
Lloyd Aéreo Boliviano	Bolivia		2	Leased from Globe Jet	
LTU International	Germany	10	3		
Luzair	Portugal		2		
Merpati Nusantara Airlines	Indonesia	1		Leased from Orient Thai Airlines	
Nordic European Airlines	Sweden	5		Ceased operations in 1998	
Northeast Airlines	Swaziland	2		Ceased operations in 2005	
Northeast Bolivian Airways	Bolivia	1			
Novair	Sweden	1	3		
Orient Thai Airlines	Thailand	6			
Pacific Southwest Airlines	USA	2		Returned to Lockheed	
Pan Am	USA		12		
Privilege Jet Airlines	Jordan	1			
Rich International Airways	USA	14	1	Ceased operations in 1996	
Royal Aviation	Canada	4		Ceased operations in 2001	
Royal Jordanian Airlines	Jordan		9		
SAM Intercontinental	Mali	3		Operated one L-1011-100 (TZ-SGI). Retired in 2011 and has since been stored at Ras Al Khaimah International Airport.	
Saudia	Saudi Arabia	18			
Sky Capital Airlines	Bangladesh	2		Operated two L-1011-100 (S2-AET and S2-AKB). This aircraft performed its final flight on 22 March 2010, following an engine failure upon takeoff from Dhaka. It remained grounded and was eventually Log out and scrapped in February Around 2014.	
Sky Gate International Aviation	Jordan	4		Ceased operations in 2008	
Star Air Limited	Sierra Leone	3	2	Ceased operations in 2006	
TAAG Angola Airlines	Angola		1	Leased from TAP Air Portugal	
TAP Air Portugal	Portugal		7		
TBG Airways	UK	3		Operated by Aer Turas; Ceased operations in 1999	
Thai Sky Airlines	Thailand	3			
Time Air Sweden	Sweden	1		Ceased operations in 1993	
Trans World Airlines	USA	39			
United Airlines	USA		6		
West African Link	Gambia	1		Never used in service	
Worldways Canada	Canada	6		Ceased operations in 1990	
Yes – Linhas Aéreas Charter	Portugal		2	Rebranded as White Airways in 2005	
Elite Aviation	Ghana	1		Operated one L-1011-100 (9G-SGF). The aircraft ceased operations in 2011 and was ferried to Ras Al Khaimah International Airport for storage.	

== Military and government operators ==
- Algerian Air Force
- Royal Jordanian Air Force
- Royal Saudi Air Force
- Royal Air Force - Lockheed TriStar (RAF) operated by No. 216 Squadron RAF and retired in 2014.
