= GJA =

GJA may refer to:

- Ghana Journalists Association
- Globe Jet, a defunct Lebanese airline
- Golden Joystick Awards
- Guanaja Airport, in Honduras
- Gojra railway station, in Pakistan
- Gap junction α, subcategory of gap junction proteins in biology
