= Thai Sky Airlines =

Charter airline of Thailand (2004–2006)

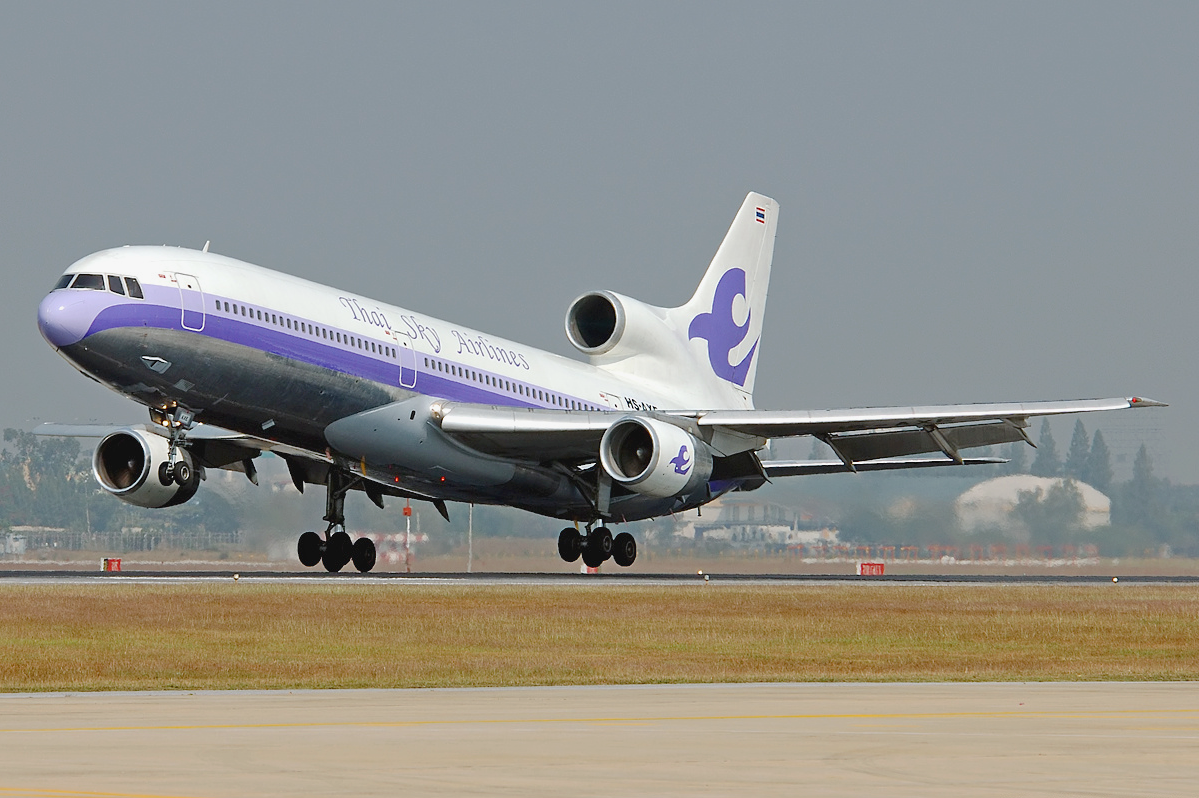
- Thai Sky Airlines' Lockheed L-1011-385-1 Tristar
IATA	ICAO	Call sign
9I	LLR	THAI SKY AIR
- Founded: 30 January 2004
- Commenced operations: 19 May 2005
- Ceased operations: 6 October 2006
- Operating bases: Don Mueang International Airport
- Headquarters: Huai Khwang District, Bangkok
- Website: https://web.archive.org/web/*/http://www.thaiskyairlines.com

Thai Sky Airlines Co., Ltd was a short-lived charter airline based in Thailand, with head office in the Le Concorde Tower in Huai Khwang District, Bangkok. The airline ceased operations in 2006.

== History ==
Plans for purchasing of aircraft and setting up of airport operations started in 2002 and the airline was officially established on 30 January 2004. The first flight to Hong Kong was launched on 19 May 2005. Flights to Kuala Lumpur were launched on 21 May 2005. It is a joint venture with Thai, Hong Kong and Taiwan interests, and was set up primarily to operate charter flights for tour groups travelling from Hong Kong to Thailand. The airline ceased operations in 2006.

== Fleet ==
At its peak, the Thai Sky Airlines fleet included three Lockheed L-1011 Tristar jets. One of the few airlines still flying the plane, it had two L-1011s for passenger service and one for cargo. However, all three were parked in August 2006 for lack of spare parts, and were cancelled from the Thai register on October 6, 2006. The airline also flew the converted Boeing 747-206BM(SUD) between 2005 and 2006< for passenger flights.

In October 2006, Thai Sky leased a McDonnell Douglas MD-82 from Khors Air as a replacement. However, the aircraft was soon repossessed, leaving the airline with no planes.

== Aircraft (grounded) ==
Two wide-body aircraft —

- 2 x Lockheed L-1011-1 TriStar - HS-AXE is now a restaurant at the Chang Chui Market in Bangkok, Thailand.

HS-AXA is turned into a cafe called Pour Over Lab at Niagara N Garden restaurant in Nakhon Pathom, Thailand.
