= Luzair =

Portuguese airline

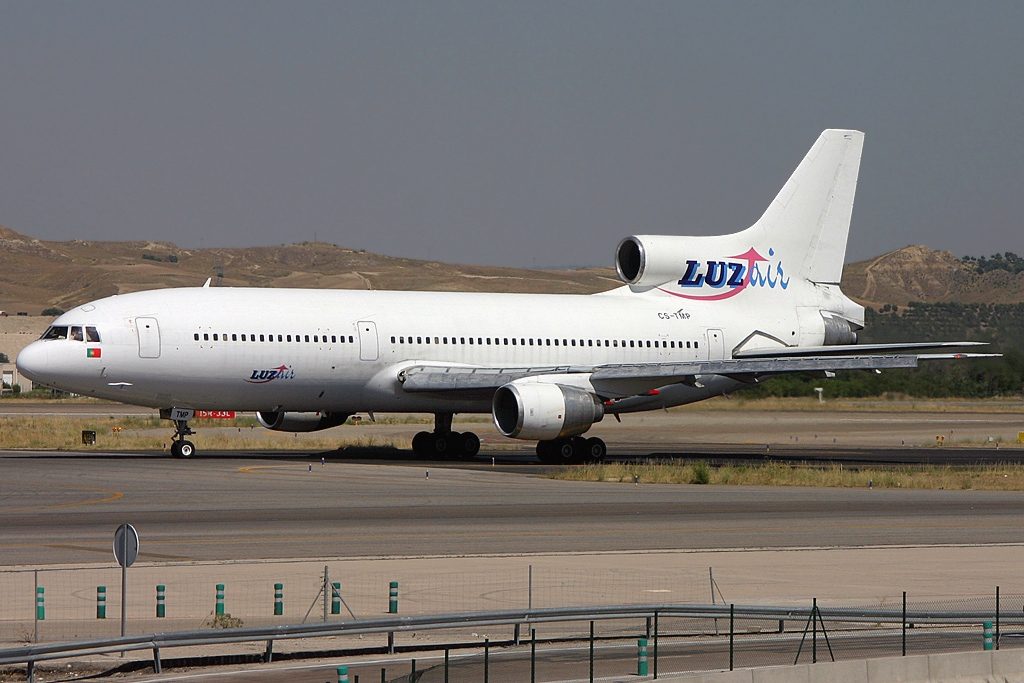
IATA	ICAO	Call sign
-	LUZ	LISBON JET
- Founded: 1997
- Ceased operations: 2011
- Hubs: Portela Airport
- Fleet size: 1
- Headquarters: Lisbon, Portugal
- Website: luzair.com

Luzair - Transportes Aéreos, S.A. was an airline based in Lisbon, Portugal, specializing in wet lease and ad hoc charter operations.

It was founded in 1997. In 2000, Luzair developed into an airline consulting and brokerage business. It operated a Lockheed L-1011 TriStar until 2008 and a Boeing 767. Luzair suspended operations in January 2011. Plans to resume business in early 2012 did not materialize.
