= Globe Jet =

IATA	ICAO	Call sign
-	GJA	-
- Founded: 2003
- Ceased operations: 2007
- Hubs: Beirut Rafic Hariri International Airport
- Fleet size: None
- Headquarters: Beirut, Lebanon
- Key people: Z.J. Atallah
- Website: http://www.globejetairlines.com/

Globe Jet SAL was an aviation company based in Beirut, Lebanon, offering wet leasing and charter services to airlines and other companies. Its main base was in Beirut Rafic Hariri International Airport.

== History ==
The airline was established in December 2003, and started operations in January 2004. As of July 2007, it has 130 employees, and a fleet size of 5 Lockheed L-1011-500 Tristar.

In 2007, the airline ceased all operations. By 2008 all the TriStars had been sold or withdrawn from use.

== Fleet ==
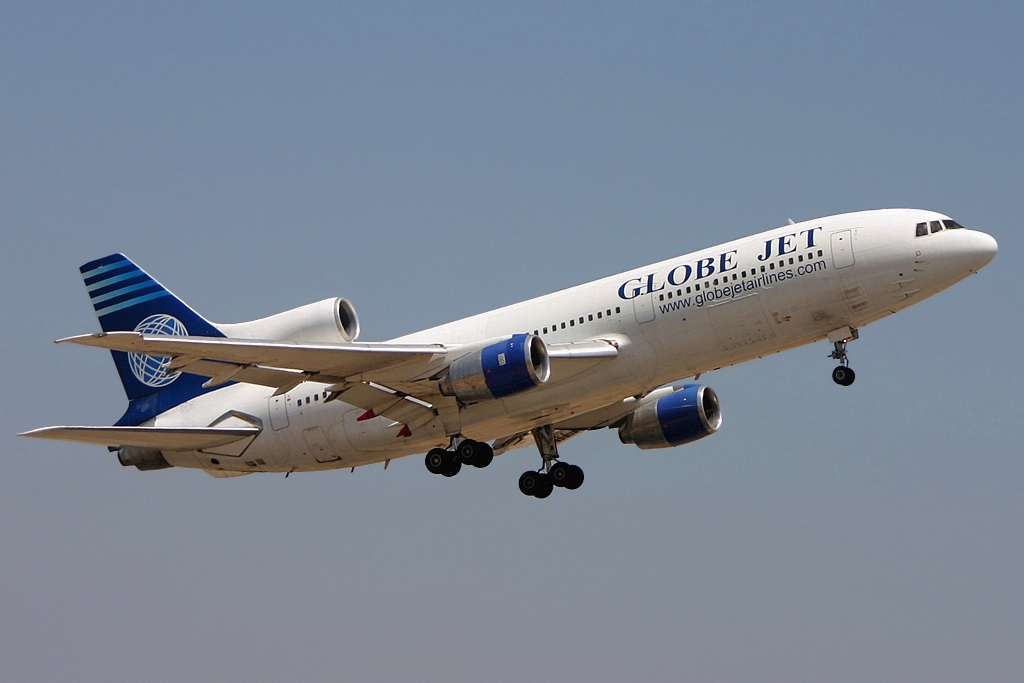
A Globe Jet Lockheed L-1011 TriStar taking off.

According to their website, the Globe Jet fleet consisted of the following aircraft (as of 2007):

Globe Jet fleet
Aircraft	In fleet	Orders	Notes
Lockheed L1011-500	5	0	
