= Aer Turas =

Cargo airline of Ireland

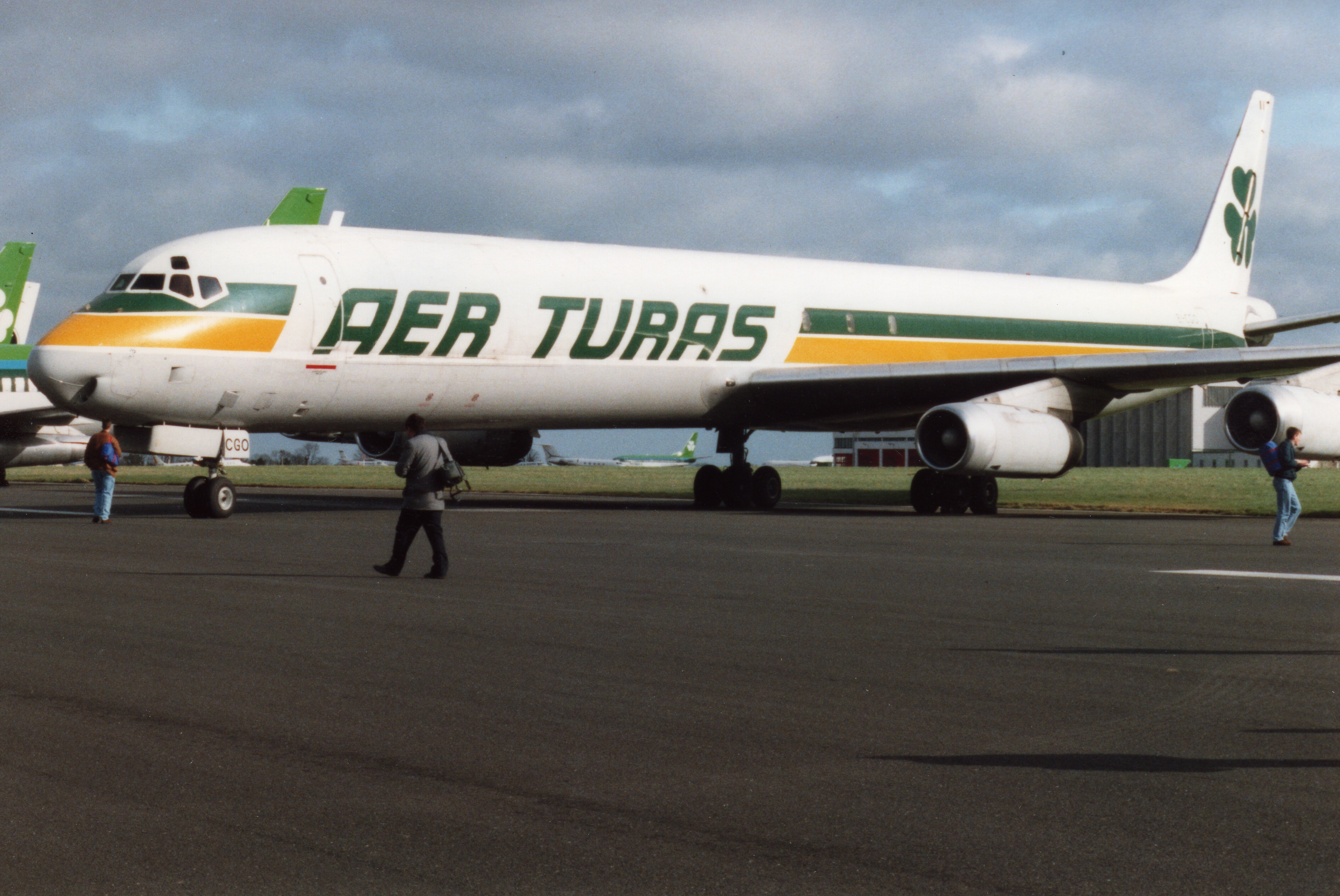
- Aer Turas Douglas DC-8, 1993
| IATA | ICAO | Call sign |
|---|---|---|
| QT | ATT | AER TURAS |
- Founded: 1962
- Commenced operations: June 1962
- Ceased operations: 25 June 2003
- Hubs: Dublin Airport
- Parent company: Aer Lingus

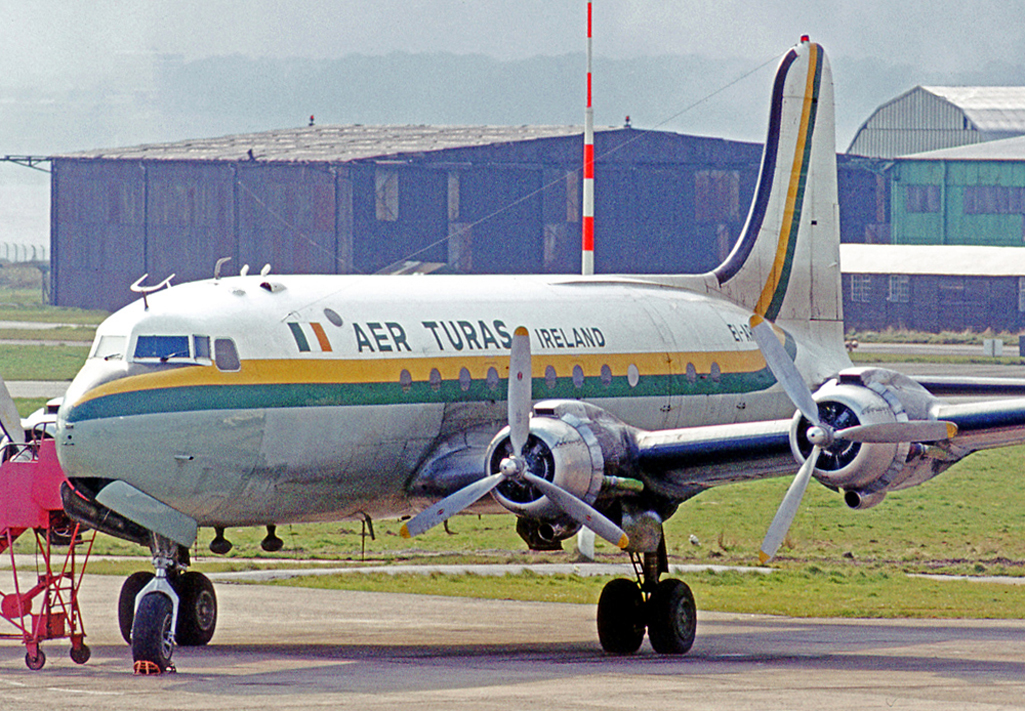
Aer Turas Douglas DC-4 freighter at Liverpool (Speke) Airport in 1967

Aer Turas Teoranta (from the Irish meaning Air Journey) was an Irish airline and later a freight operator based in Dublin, Ireland, from 1962 until May 2003.

== History ==
Aer Turas started operations in 1962 as an air taxi service from Ireland to the UK with a single de Havilland Dragon Rapide. From the month of June it began to focus on freight rather than passenger operations and were quite successful for many years although between the second half of 1964 and June 1965 all activities were interrupted.

In August 1980 Aer Lingus acquired a majority shareholding in Aer Turas which was maintained until 1994. However, almost a decade later, soaring insurance costs, increased competition and the turbulence following the September 11th terrorist attacks in the USA all contributed to an overall operating loss and ultimately resulted in the company going into receivership. Flight operations were halted on 25 June 2003, exactly 41 years after starting the business

== Fleet ==
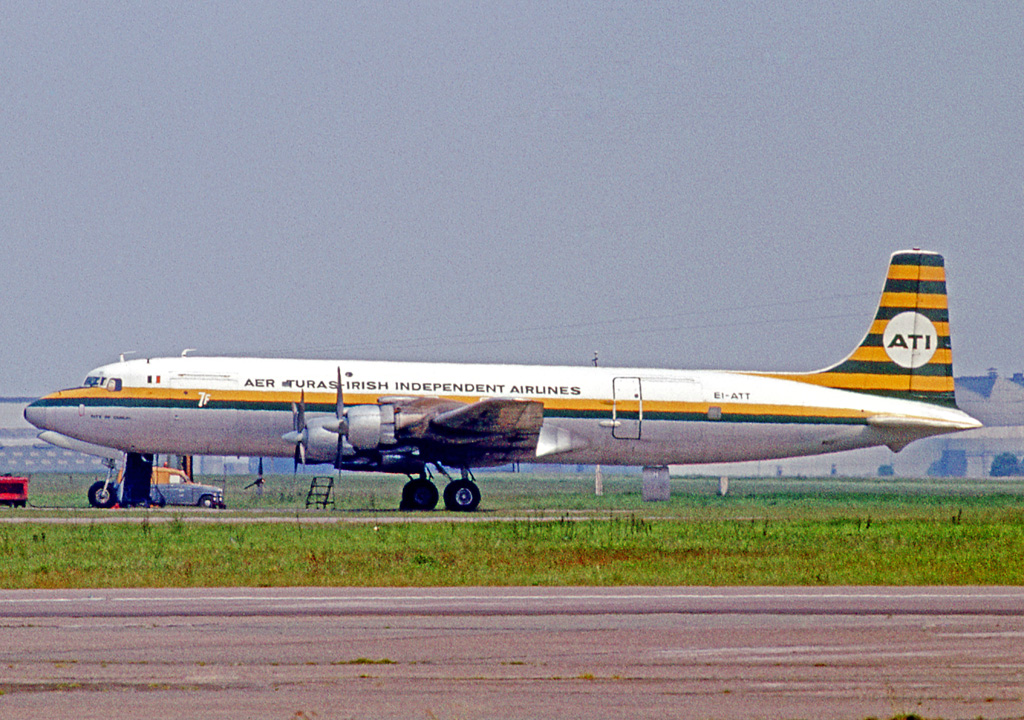
Douglas DC-7CF freighter at Liverpool Airport in 1969

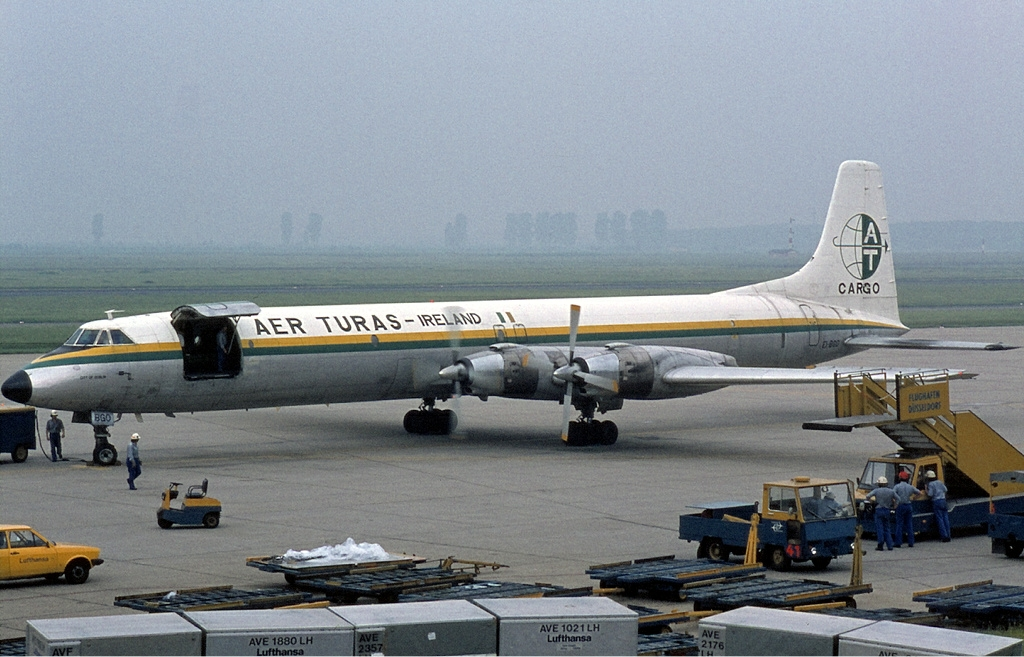
Canadair CL-44 at Dusseldorf airport in 1982

The airline began operations with a single de Havilland Dragon Rapide. Soon they expanded the fleet with Douglas DC-3, DC-4, DC-7, DC-8-63, Bristol 170 and Canadair CL44 aircraft. Of the two remaining DC-8 aircraft, EI-CGO was sold to First International Airlines and EI-BNA was to be broken up for spares.

The last aircraft acquired for the fleet was passenger configured EI-CNN (formerly G-BAAA & VR-HHV) a Lockheed L-1011-385-1 TriStar 1 (cn 193K-1024) which had been delivered new to the Court Line, based at London Luton Airport, in February 1973. It was returned to Lockheed when Court Line ceased trading. In 1977 it became VR-HHV with Cathay Pacific and flew for them for 2 decades. Then to EI-CNN with Aer Turas working for TBG, Kampuchea and Air Scandic before being stored in 1998 at Abu Dhabi (AUH) pending a C-Check which never happened and was ultimately scrapped in 2006. This was a historically significant aircraft in that it was the first wide-body in Europe with a charter operator and revolutionised the European aviation industry.

== Accidents and incidents ==
- 12 June 1967: A Bristol Freighter (registration: EI-APM) arriving at Dublin Airport from Prestwick, made a heavy landing. The crew attempted a go-around but had lost power from one engine. The aircraft failed to gain altitude and banked left until it struck ground objects including an office block, then bursting into flames. Both pilots were killed and aircraft written off. This was the first fatal crash at Dublin Airport.
- 3 March 1974: A Douglas DC-7C/F (registration: EI-AWG) operating an Aer Turas Teo charter flight from Dublin landed at Luton Airport on runway 08 just after midnight but failed to achieve reverse thrust. Normal braking application also appeared to the crew to be ineffective and the emergency pneumatic brakes were applied. All main wheel tyres burst. The aircraft overran the runway and continued over the steep bank at the eastern perimeter finally coming to rest in soft ground 90 metres beyond. The situation had also been made worse by an inadvertent application of forward thrust by the crew in trying to achieve reverse thrust. Three of the six passengers and two of the four crew were injured. The aircraft was badly damaged and deemed a write-off.

== Bibliography ==
- Byrne L., HISTORY OF AVIATION IN IRELAND, The Blackwater Press, Dublin, 1980
