= Air Universal =

Jordanian airline (2001–2008)

IATA	ICAO	Call sign
UV	UVS	UNI-LEONE
- Founded: 2001
- Commenced operations: 2002
- Ceased operations: 2008
- Hubs: Queen Alia International Airport
- Headquarters: Amman, Jordan
- Website: http://www.airuniversalltd.com/

Air Universal was a privately owned airline based in Amman, Jordan, which operated chartered passenger flights between 2002 and 2008. The airline was based at Queen Alia International Airport, Amman, focussing at King Abdulaziz International Airport, Jeddah, Jinnah International Airport, Karachi, Mehrabad International Airport, Tehran and Tripoli International Airport.

Air Universal was registered Jordanian Ministry of Industry and Trade. It held an AOC as commercial operator of scheduled and chartered flights for both passengers and cargo, specializing on operating chartered flights on behalf of other airlines, including aircraft leases.

The airline stopped operating its aircraft in 2008.
