= Lockheed L-1011 TriStar =

American wide-body trijet airliner

- An L-1011-1 TriStar of Delta Air Lines

General information
- Type: Wide-body jet airliner
- National origin: United States
- Manufacturer: Lockheed Corporation
- Status: Retired from commercial use, one in service as Stargazer
- Primary users: Northrop Grumman: British Airways (historical); Delta Air Lines (historical); Eastern Air Lines (historical)
- Number built: 250

History
- Manufactured: 1968–1984
- Introduction date: April 26, 1972, with Eastern Air Lines
- First flight: November 16, 1970
- Variants: RAF TriStar; Stargazer

The Lockheed L-1011 TriStar (pronounced "L-ten-eleven") is an American medium-to-long-range, wide-body trijet airliner built by the Lockheed Corporation. It was the third wide-body airliner to enter commercial operations, after the Boeing 747 and the McDonnell Douglas DC-10. The L-1011 has a seating capacity of up to 400 passengers and a range of over 4,000 nautical miles (7,410 km; 4,600 mi). It is powered by three Rolls-Royce RB211 engines, with one engine under each wing, and a third engine center-mounted in the rear fuselage with an S-duct air inlet on the top of the fuselage. The aircraft has an autoland capability, an automated descent control system, and available lower deck galley and lounge facilities.

The L-1011 TriStar was produced in two fuselage lengths. The original L-1011-1 first flew in November 1970 and entered service with Eastern Air Lines in 1972. The shortened, longer range L-1011-500 first flew in 1978 and entered service with British Airways a year later. The original-length TriStar was also produced as the high gross weight L-1011-100, the up-rated engine L-1011-200, and the further upgraded L-1011-250. Post-production conversions for the L-1011-1 with increased takeoff weights included the L-1011-50 and L-1011-150.

The L-1011 TriStar's sales were hampered by two years of delays due to developmental and financial problems at Rolls-Royce, the sole manufacturer of the aircraft's engines. Between 1968 and 1984, Lockheed manufactured a total of 250 TriStars, assembled at the Lockheed plant located at the Palmdale Regional Airport in southern California north of Los Angeles. After L-1011 production ended, Lockheed withdrew from the commercial aircraft business due to its below-target sales. As of 2026, only one airworthy L-1011 is in service, as Stargazer.

== Development ==
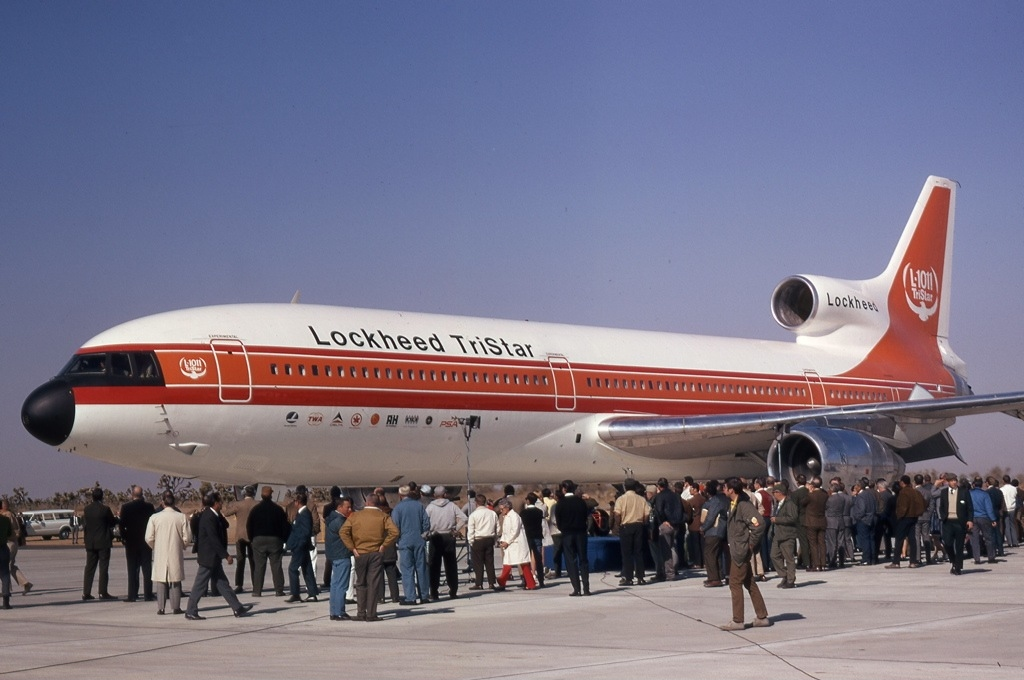
Prototype L-1011 TriStar being prepared for its first flight test in 1970

=== Origins ===
In the 1960s, American Airlines approached Lockheed and competitor Douglas (later McDonnell Douglas) with the need for an airliner that could carry 250 passengers on transcontinental routes. Lockheed had not produced civilian airliners since 1961 with the L-188 Electra. In the 1950s the Electra was designed for turboprop propulsion, which Lockheed successfully used on the C-130 Hercules military transport. Even after the Electra overcame vibration problems that caused several crashes early in its career, the market for large airliners would soon shift over to jet airliners such as the Boeing 707 and Douglas DC-8. Lockheed won contracts for jet military transports with the C-141 StarLifter, and pioneered very large jet transports with the large C-5 Galaxy with its high-bypass turbofan engines. Boeing lost the military contract, but its private-venture 747 would later capture a much larger civilian airliner market for wide-body airliners.

Having experienced difficulties with some of its military programs, Lockheed was eager to re-enter the civilian market with a smaller wide-body jet, and its response was the L-1011 TriStar. Douglas Aircraft answered American Airlines with the DC-10, which had a similar three-engine configuration and dimensions. Despite their similarities, the L-1011 and DC-10's engineering approach differed greatly. McDonnell, who had recently taken over Douglas Aircraft, directed DC-10 development on a "very firm budget, and cost overruns were unacceptable – even at the expense of safety", and the conservative approach meant reusing Douglas DC-8 technology. By contrast, Lockheed would "take the most advanced technology of the day and when that technology was lacking, Lockheed created it" for the L-1011 to give it lower noise emissions, improved reliability, and higher efficiency over first-generation jet airliners. The TriStar name was selected in a Lockheed employee naming contest for the airliner. The advanced technology that went into the TriStar resulted in a high purchase price.

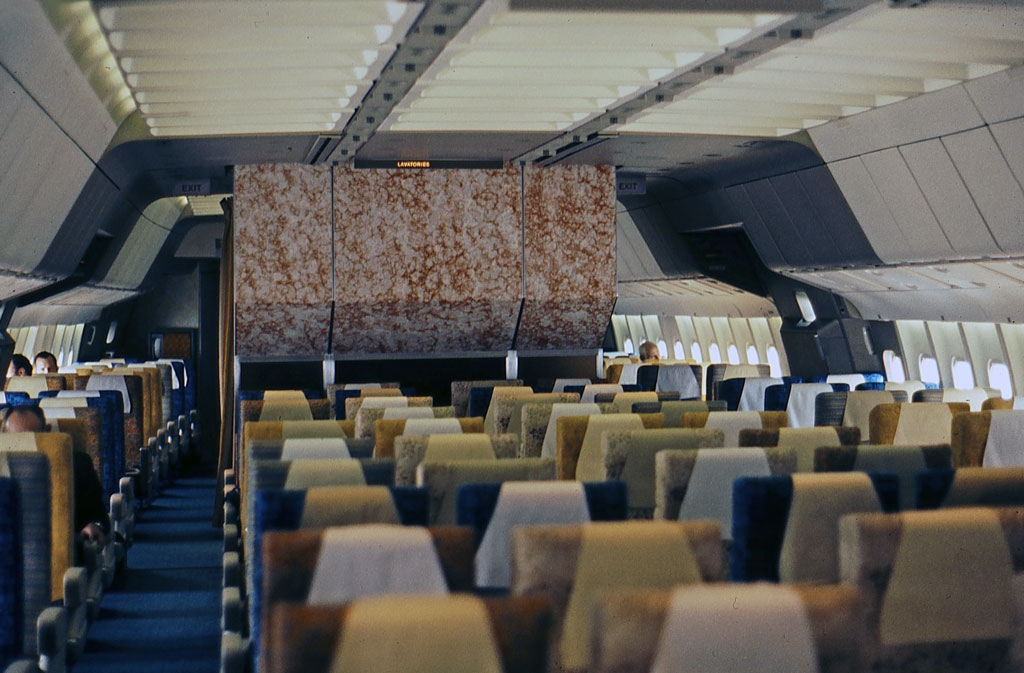
TWA Lockheed L-1011-1 Tristar twin-aisle cabin in 1972

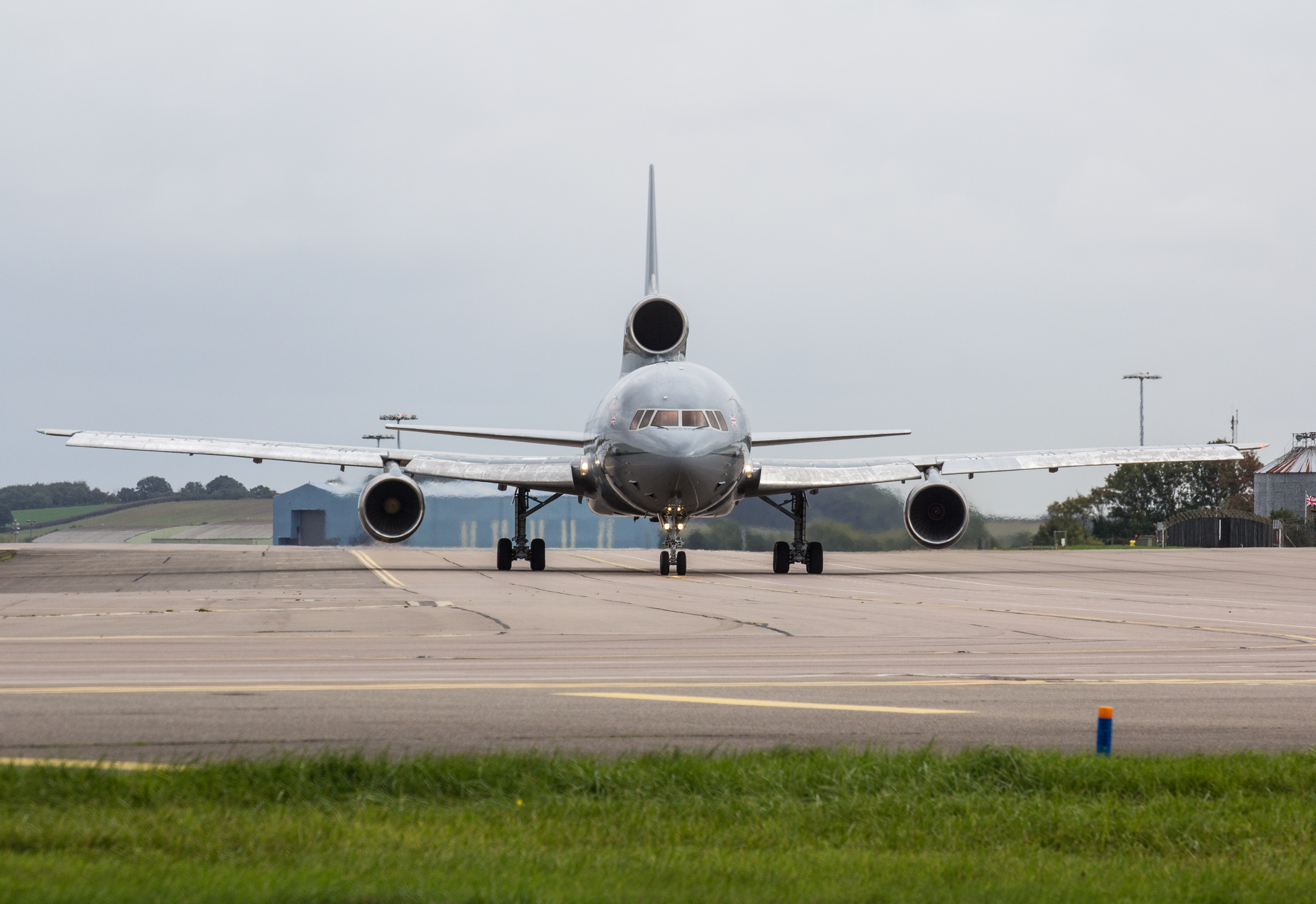
Lockheed L-1011 TriStar front view showing 3-engine layout

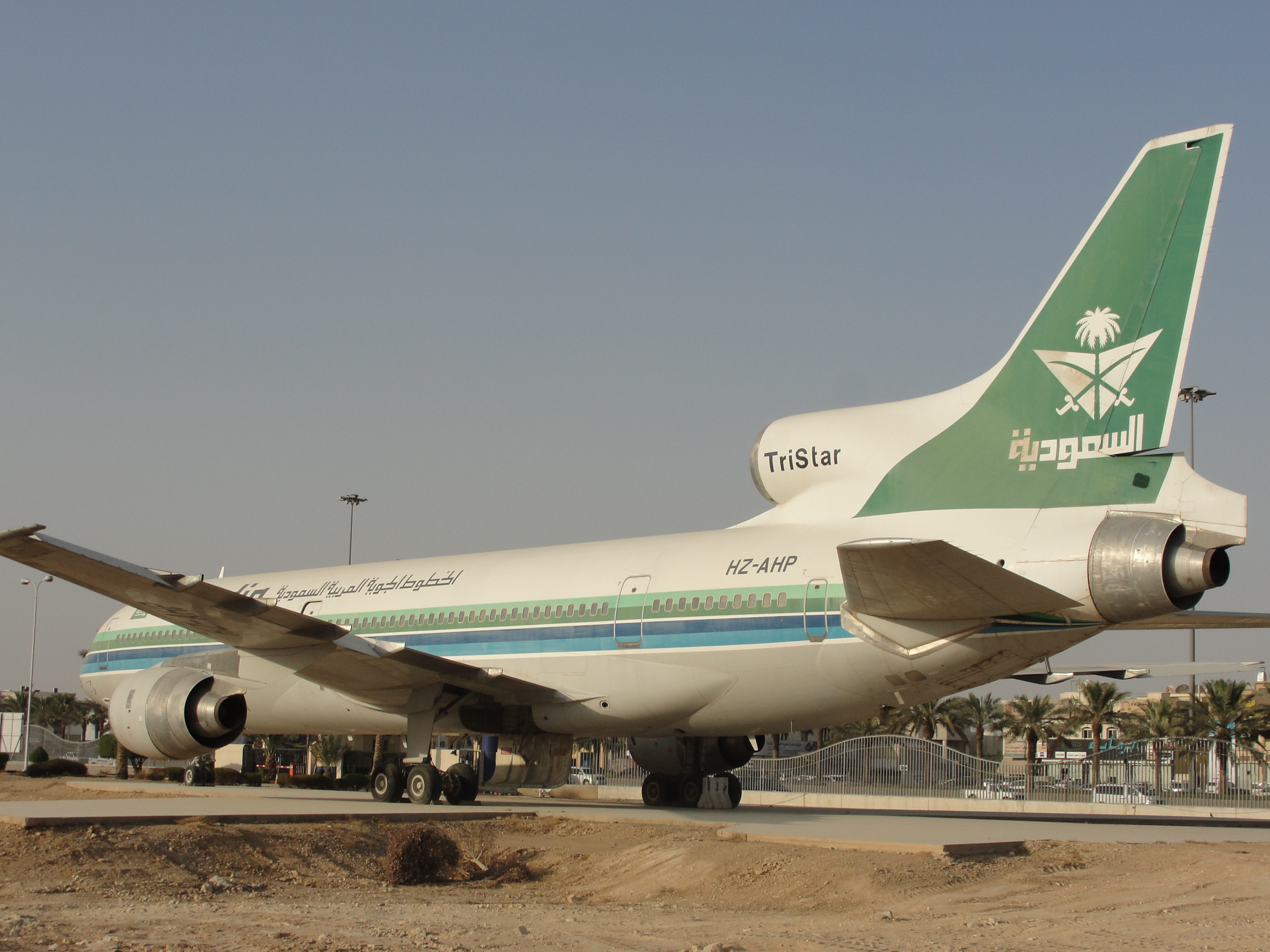
The S-duct configuration with the air intake offset above the rear engine

The TriStar's design featured a twin-aisle interior with a maximum of 400 passengers and a three-engine layout. The TriStar was originally conceived as a "jumbo twin", but a three-engine design was ultimately chosen to give the aircraft enough thrust to take off from existing runways. Also, before the establishment of Extended Operations standards by the FAA in the 1980s, commercial jets with only two engines were not allowed to fly more than 60 minutes away from an airport, making trans-oceanic flights impossible. The main visible difference between the TriStar and its similar trijet competitor, the McDonnell Douglas DC-10, is the center engine position: the DC-10's engine is mounted above the fuselage for simplicity of design and more economical construction, while the TriStar's engine is installed in the rear fuselage with air entering through an S-duct for reduced drag and improved stability. Lockheed was able to keep the pressure loss in the S-duct similar to that in a straight duct by limiting the duct curvature. Incorporating the S-duct made the airframe lighter than with a straight duct installation. The research undertaken during the design of the L-1011 indicated that losses of using an S-duct were more than compensated for by the above savings. A further major difference between the L-1011 and the DC-10 was Lockheed's selection of the Rolls-Royce RB.211 as the only engine option for the L-1011. As originally designed, the RB.211 turbofan was an advanced three-spool design with a carbon fiber fan, which would have better efficiency and power-to-weight ratio than any competing engine like the General Electric CF6 that powered the DC-10. In theory, the triple spool would produce the same or more power as existing double spool engines while having a smaller cross section that would reduce drag.

American Airlines opted for the Douglas DC-10, although it showed considerable interest in the L-1011. American intended to convince Douglas to lower its price for the DC-10, which it did. Without the support of American, the TriStar was launched on orders from Trans World Airlines (TWA) and Eastern Air Lines.

Although the TriStar's design schedule closely followed that of its competitor, McDonnell Douglas beat Lockheed to market by a year due to delays in powerplant development. In February 1971, after massive development costs associated with the RB.211, Rolls-Royce went into receivership. This halted L-1011 final assembly and Lockheed investigated the possibility of a US engine supplier. However the engineering was finalized at that stage in the TriStar's development and its S-duct, which was designed to fit the smaller cross-section of the triple spool RB-211 engine that would have reduced drag, was too small in diameter to accommodate an existing double spool engine. One option presented was potential outsource of RB-211 production to Canadian manufacturer Orenda Engines.

The British government agreed to approve a large state subsidy to restart Rolls-Royce operations on condition that the U.S. government guarantee the bank loans Lockheed needed to complete the L-1011 project. (Note: The British government did approve a large state subsidy because if Lockheed (which was weakened by the difficulties) had failed, the market for the RB.211 would have evaporated.) Despite some opposition, not least from the then governor of California, Ronald Reagan, the U.S. government provided these guarantees. For the rest of the RB.211 project, Rolls-Royce remained a government-owned company.

=== Production ===
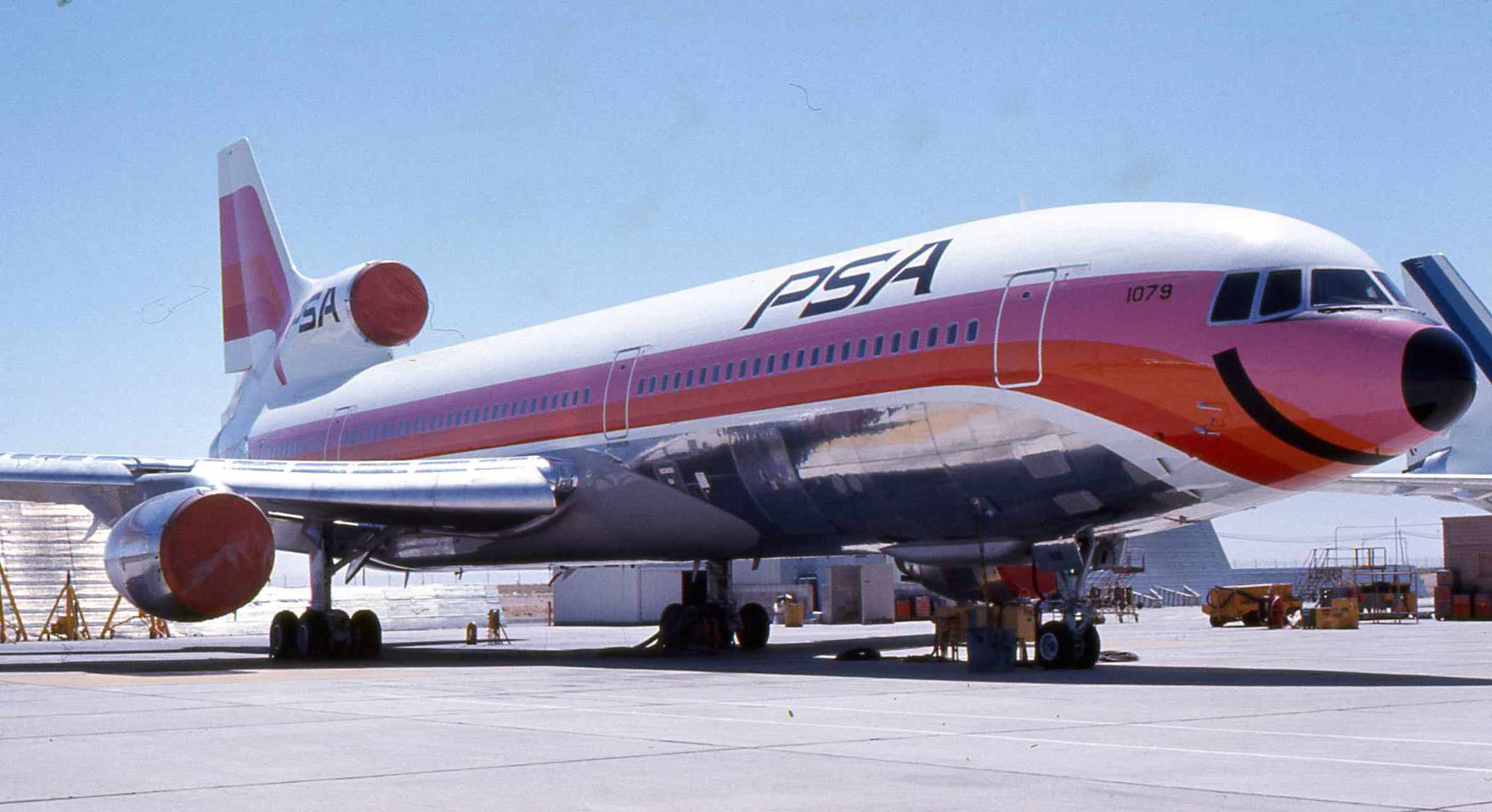
An L-1011-1 of Pacific Southwest Airlines at Lockheed's Palmdale plant

The TriStar's internal Lockheed model number is L-093. The TriStar was manufactured in Lockheed facilities in Burbank and Palmdale, California. The prototype L-1011 first flew on November 16, 1970. The L-1011 was certified on April 14, 1972, with the first airliner delivered to Eastern Air Lines on April 26, 1972. In 1972, its unit cost was US$20 million (~$117 million in 2025). To further publicize the new aircraft, an L-1011, possibly the prototype, was taken on a world tour during 1972 by famed Lockheed test pilot Tony LeVier. In a demonstration by test pilots LeVier and Charles Hall, 115 crew members, employees, and reporters embarked on the TriStar for a 4-hour, 13-minute flight from Palmdale to Dulles Airport "with the TriStar's AFCS [Automatic Flight Control System] feature engaged from takeoff roll to landing", and Lockheed touted it as "a groundbreaking moment: the first cross-country flight without the need for human hands on the controls".

Lockheed discovered fairly early on that the TriStar suffered from higher than estimated structural weight, engine weight, and specific fuel consumption. To rectify this problem and to meet performance guarantees, Lockheed developed a structural kit that allowed maximum takeoff weight (MTOW) to be increased on production aircraft from 409,000 to 430,000 pounds (186,000 to 195,000 kg). However, the weight problems affected the desirability of early production L-1011-1 aircraft, known as Group 1 (serial numbers 1002 through to 1012).

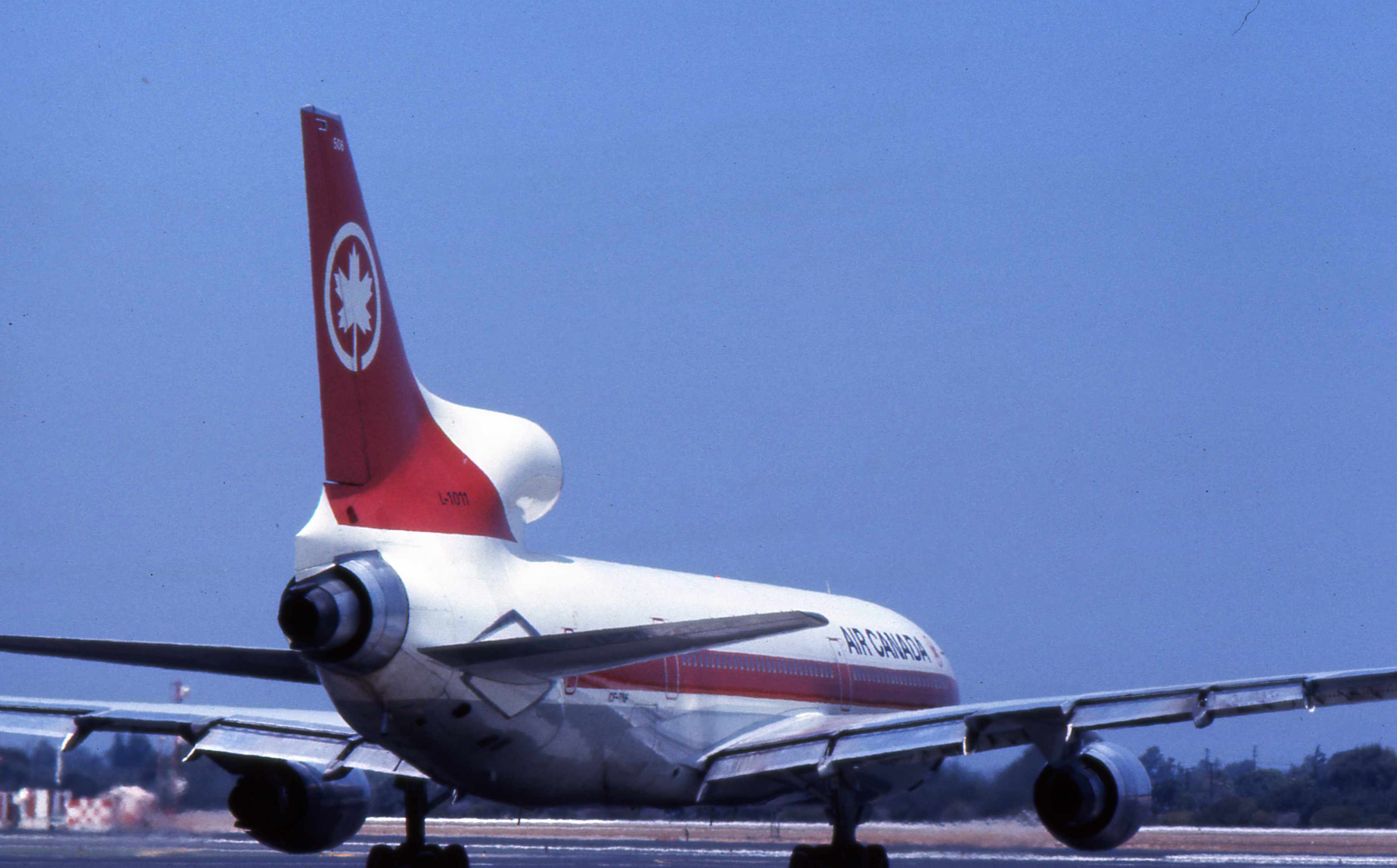
Air Canada L 1011

Group 1 aircraft have an Operating empty weight (OEW) of 252,700 pounds (114,600 kg), about 12,700 pounds (5,800 kg) higher than later aircraft, while Group 2 aircraft (serial numbers 1013 through 1051) have an OEW of 247,000 pounds (112,000 kg), some 4,700 pounds (2,100 kg) lower. These aircraft, in general, also have different center of gravity envelopes with the forward center of gravity limit on the early aircraft being more restrictive at higher gross weights. Groups 1 and 2 aircraft (serial numbers 1002 to 1051) are upgradeable only to -50 or -150 specifications, although the Group 1 aircraft (up to serial number 1012) still maintain their operating disadvantages. All L-1011-1 aircraft from serial number 1052 onwards are Group 3 aircraft and are fully upgradeable to all variants up to -250 specification.

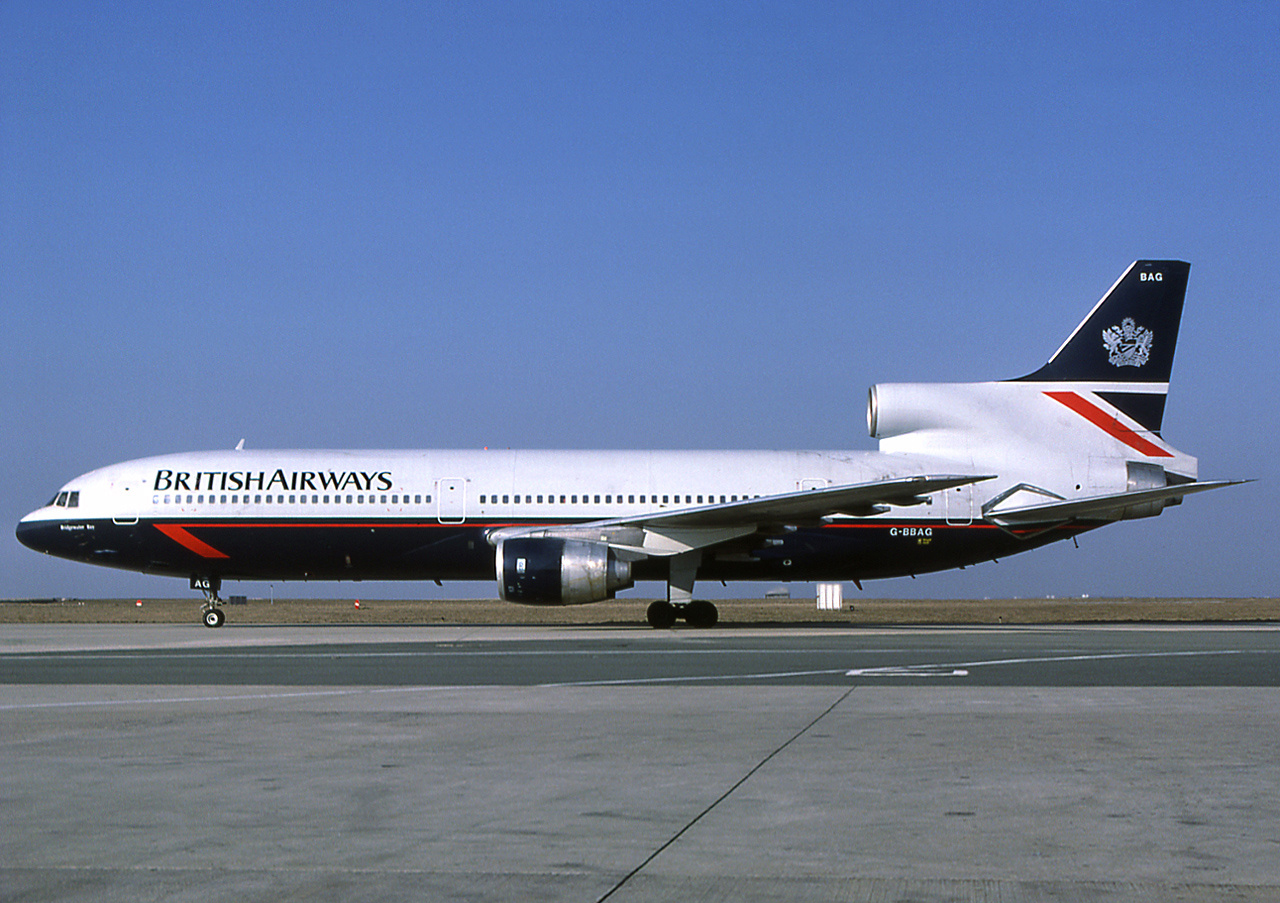
British Airways L-1011 TriStar in Landor livery in 1986

Costs at Rolls-Royce were controlled and its efforts largely went into the original TriStar engines, which needed considerable modifications between the L-1011's first flight and service entry. The competition, notably General Electric, was very quick to develop its GE CF6 engine with more thrust, which meant that a heavier "intercontinental" McDonnell Douglas DC-10-30 with additional center landing gear could be more quickly brought to market. The flexibility afforded to potential customers by a long-range DC-10 put the L-1011 at a serious disadvantage. Rolls-Royce went on to develop the high-thrust RB.211-524 for the L-1011-200 and -500, but this took many years.

The resultant delay in Lockheed and Rolls-Royce offering a high gross variant with a longer range, coupled with the TriStar's delayed introduction, meant that only 250 TriStars were sold compared to over 400 DC-10s. Lockheed needed to sell 500 airliners to break even, but in 1981, the company announced production would end with the delivery of the 250th and last L-1011 on order in 1984.

The TriStar's failure to achieve profitability caused Lockheed to withdraw from the civilian aircraft business. The TriStar's rivalry with the DC-10 has been seen as a "case study in what can happen when two manufacturers attempt to split a market that simply could not support both aircraft". Lockheed lacked the resources to follow up with several proposals based on the TriStar wing and airframe, including a wide-body twinjet and a stretched quad-jet (one of the quadjet proposals consisting of two underwing engines and two rear fuselage-mounted engines). McDonnell Douglas was also financially weakened and could only develop the MD-11, a refinement of the DC-10, instead of an all-new design to challenge the next generation of twinjets like the Boeing 777.

Ultimately, both the L-1011 and the DC-10/MD-11 were doomed by this next generation of widebody twinjets such as the Boeing 767 and the Airbus A330 - as the rules on ETOPS gradually extended to longer distance routes - thanks largely to the improving reliability and performance of jet engines which made trijet aircraft less cost efficient to operate. Widebody twinjets become the dominant configuration for long haul operations.

== Design ==
=== Engines ===
The RB.211 and its features, despite the delays in its development, provided the L-1011 with then-unmatched fuel economy and noise levels.

==== Reversers and nozzle ====
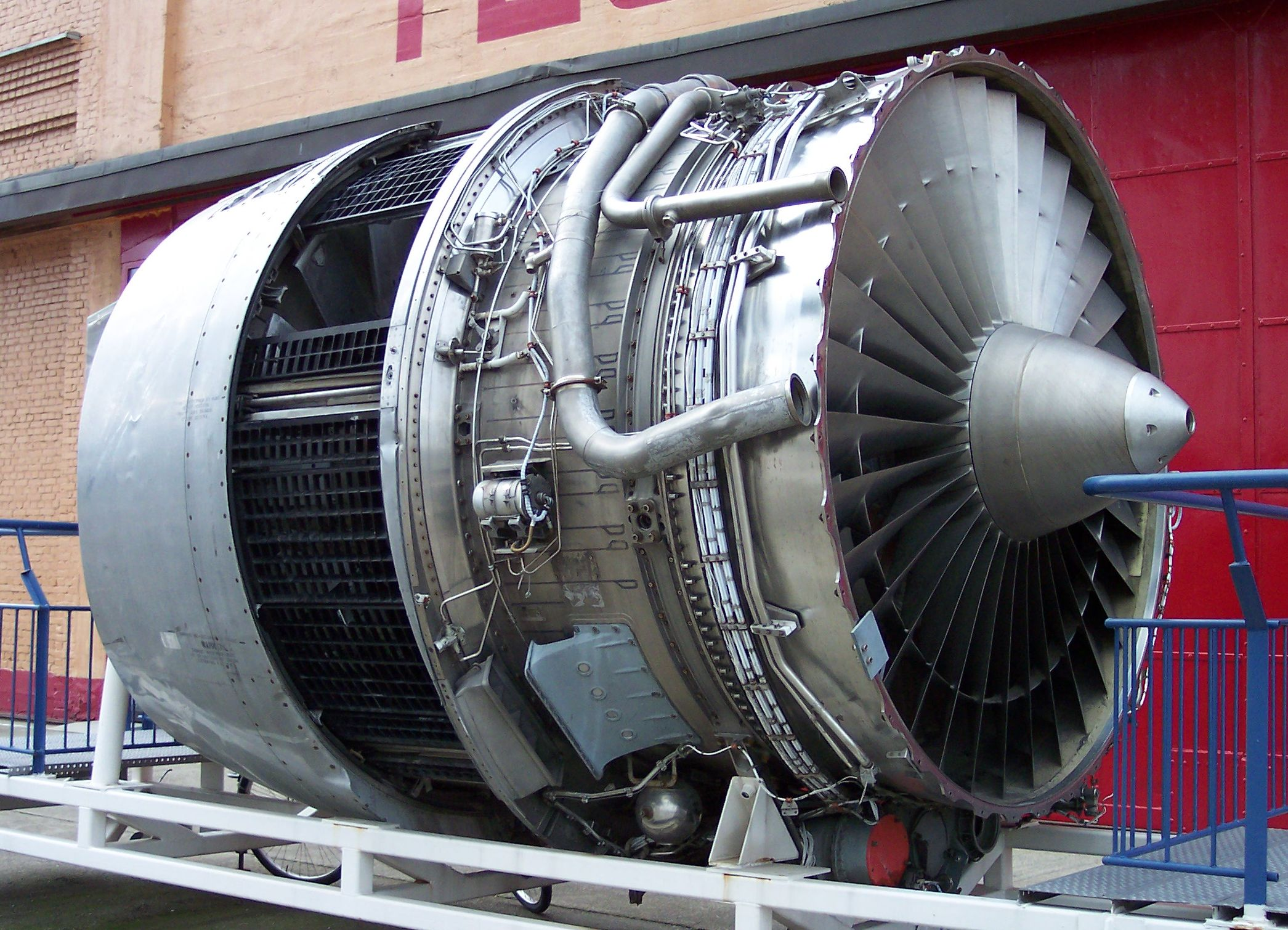
The two parts of the bypass thrust reverser are shown in their operating positions. The black grid of turning vanes allows the air to escape in a forward direction and the usual rearward flow of air for forward thrust is stopped by the blocker doors visible inside the duct.

The RB.211 has thrust reverse using the bypass air from the fan. Reverse is selected when the engine is at idle. An escape path for the air is opened up around the nacelle and blocker doors close off the duct just behind. The air passes through a grid of turning vanes which send the air in a forward direction for reverse thrust. Initially the RB.211 design also had thrust reversal for the core exhaust. Aerodynamic interference with the flaps diminished the braking effect from the flaps, so the core flow reverser was deleted; in its place an 11-degree afterbody was incorporated, which improved the specific range by 1.5%. Further improvements led to a 15-degree afterbody, enabling the L-1011 "to beat its predicted specific air range at 0.85 Mach by between 3.5 and 5.5 percent, the exact figure depending on cruise weight."

=== All-flying tail ===
Instead of the trimmable horizontal stabilizer (THS) found on most jetliners of its time, the L-1011 incorporated an all-flying tail – a stabilator. The aft portion had a geared (anti-servo) elevator that was linked to and moved with the stabilator, changing the stabilator's camber and improving the overall control surface effectiveness. Lockheed's main drive away from a THS was "[eliminating] mis-trim and runaway trim problems that have contributed to a number of accidents in the past." The fact that the elevators are not moved directly led to the failure in recognizing the jamming (trailing edge up) of the left elevator aboard Delta Air Lines Flight 1080 in 1977.

=== Fuel system ===
The L-1011-1 has four wing tanks; each inboard tank feeds the respective wing engine, and the two outboard tanks feed the tail engine via a flow equalizer. The additional center tank of the long-range variants, which is two halves, is located between the wing halves. Each center tank half acts as additional capacity to its adjacent inboard wing tank; filling it by way of ejector pumps. When the center tank is filled, it is used to crossfeed all three engines in flight (by way of the ejector pumps and crossfeed valves) until the center tank is empty and the remaining tanks are equalized.

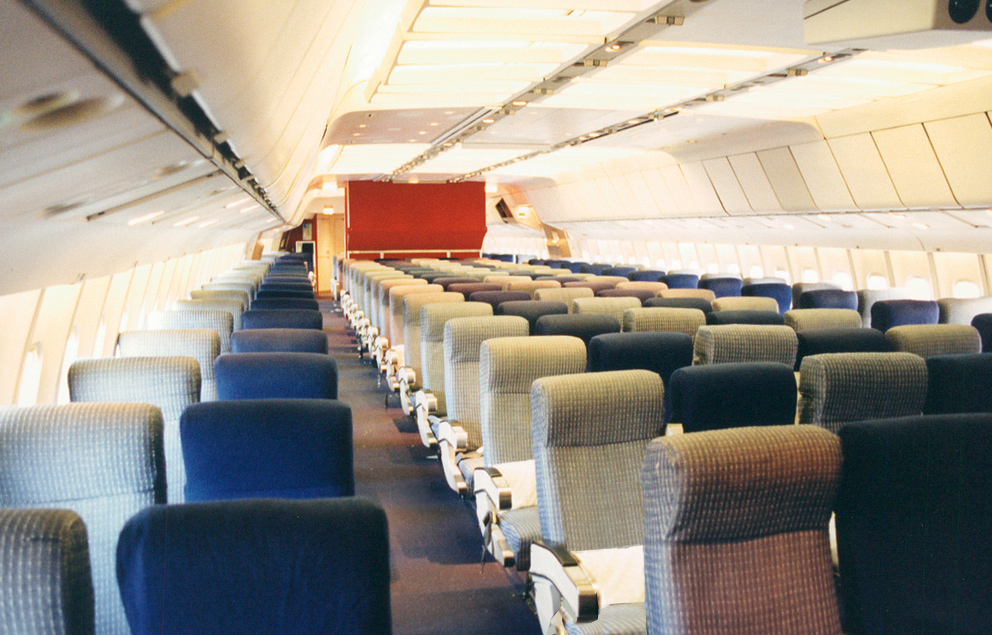
Coach cabin of a TWA L-1011 TriStar in 2–5–2 layout

=== Landing gear ===
The nose landing gear had two attachment points forward and aft, allowing a short-enough tug to push or pull the plane from directly underneath, a feature to allow operations where there wasn't enough forward space at some airports, which was more common at the time.

=== Electrical system and avionics ===
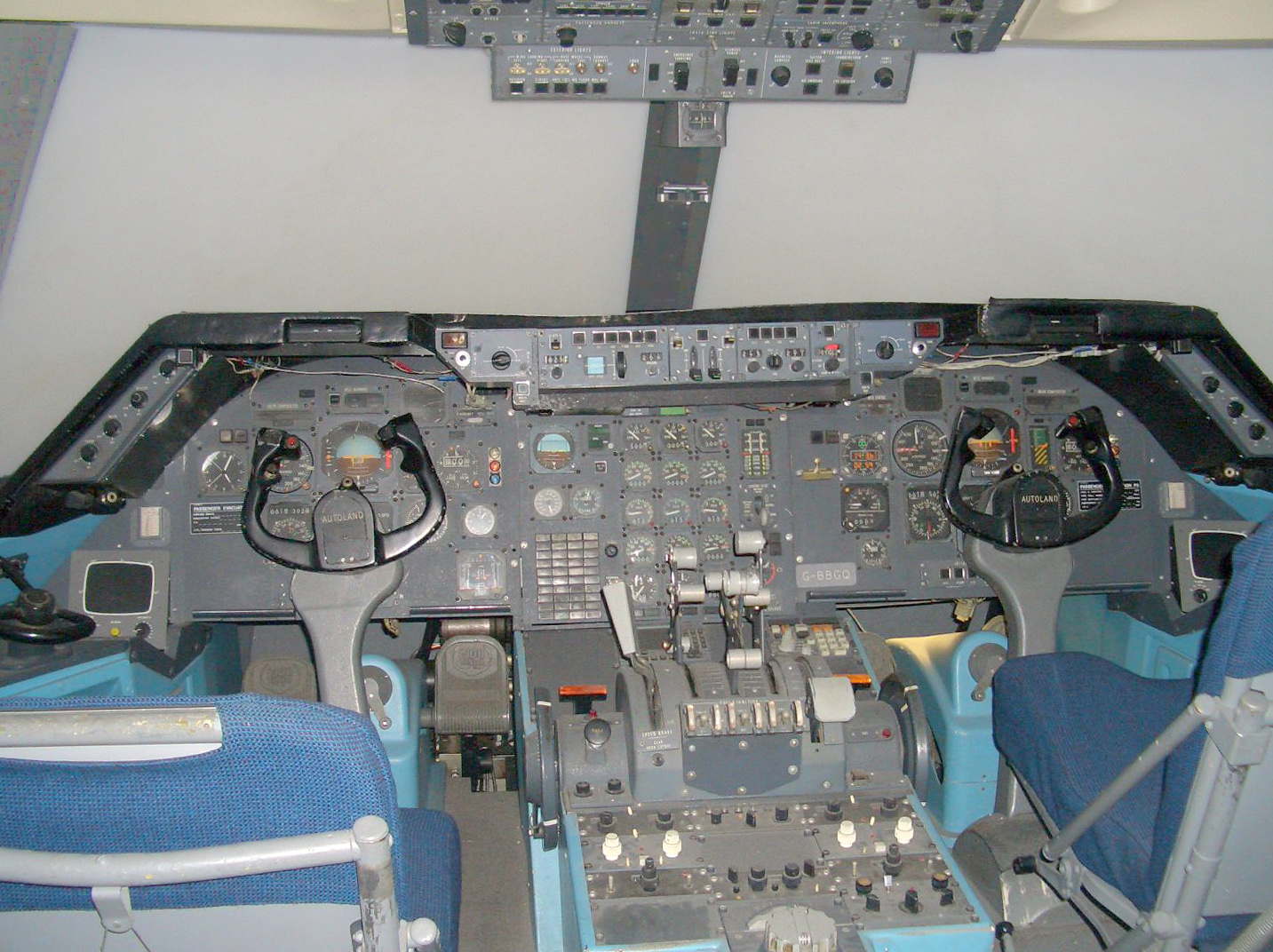
The L-1011 TriStar's three-crew flight deck

The L-1011 was the first jetliner to have an integrated drive generator (IDG).

The FMS on the L-1011, certified by the FAA in September 1977, offered many features that have since become common. The features were aimed at greatly reducing crew workload and improving fuel efficiency. Of those are a Mach/IAS cruise control, an automatic Rough Air Mode that detects turbulence and adjusts the engine power setting accordingly, and a descent mode that figures out the optimum location to start a descent by "back computing" from a preselected point, allowing "on-altitude and on-speed" arrival.

The L-1011 also featured a highly advanced autopilot system and was the first widebody to receive FAA certification for Cat-IIIc autolanding, which approved the TriStar for completely blind landings performed by the aircraft's autopilot in zero-visibility weather. The L-1011 used an inertial navigation system to navigate; this included aligning the navigation system by entering current coordinates of longitude and latitude.

It also had a unique direct lift control (DLC) system, which allowed for smooth approaches when landing, without having to use significant pitch changes while on the approach path. DLC helps maintain the aircraft on the glideslope during final approach by automatically deploying spoiler panels on the wings. Thus, rather than maintaining the descent by adjusting pitch, DLC helps control the descent while maintaining a more consistent pitch angle, using four redundant hydraulic systems.

=== Other components and systems ===
The APU, which was the Pratt and Whitney ST6L, was capable of operating up to 30,000 feet; its two square-shaped inlet doors are situated on the bottom fuselage on the aircraft's centerline towards the rear of the plane. Compared to the typical three-system of its era, the L-1011 had four independent 3,000-psi hydraulic systems.

Part of the production process also used a unique autoclave system for bonding fuselage panels together; this made the L-1011 extremely resistant to corrosion.

== Operational history ==
=== Commercial ===
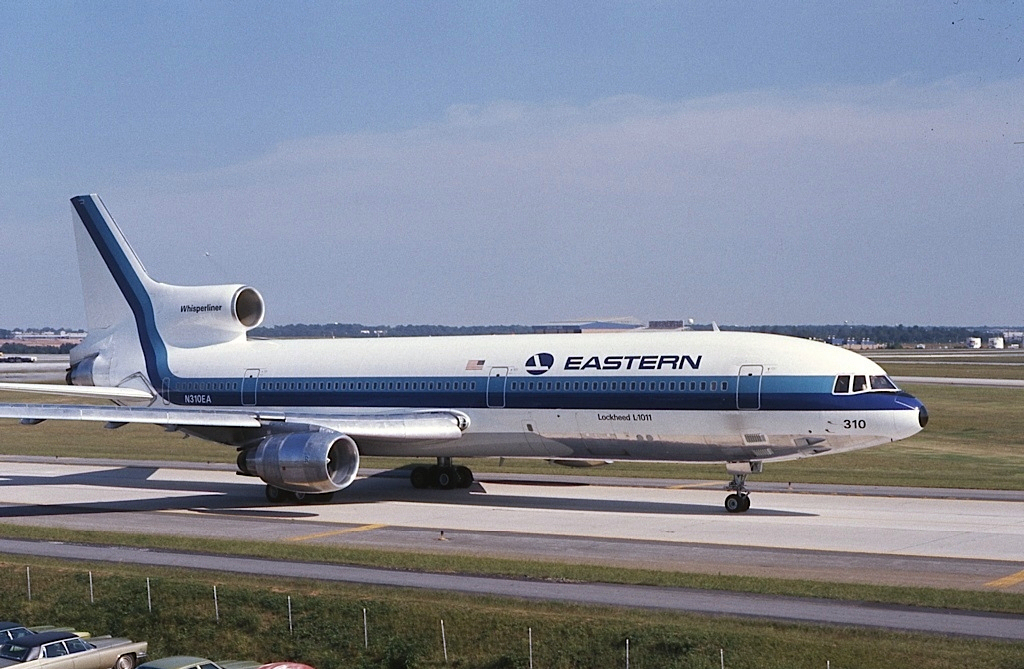
An Eastern Air Lines L-1011 TriStar in St. Louis in 1972. This aircraft would become the first L-1011 and first wide-body hull-loss as Eastern Air Lines Flight 401.

TWA heralded the TriStar as one of the safest aircraft in the world in promotional literature in the 1980s when concern over the safety record of the McDonnell Douglas DC-10, flown by rival airlines, was at its peak. The L-1011 has been involved in five fatal accidents, only one of which was due to a problem with the aircraft.

Delta Air Lines was the type's largest customer. Delta retired its TriStars in 2001 to replace them with the Boeing 767-400ER. Cathay Pacific eventually became the largest non-U.S. operator of the type by acquiring many of the Eastern Air Lines examples when Eastern went bankrupt, operating as many as 21 aircraft. Cathay Pacific retired its L-1011s in October 1996 and replaced the type with the Airbus A330-300. TWA retired its remaining L-1011s in September 1997.

To secure the Japanese market, Lockheed secretly bribed several members of the Japanese government to subsidize All Nippon Airways' purchase of L-1011s; this caused a significant scandal when the bribes were uncovered. The discovered scale to what has become known as the Lockheed bribery scandal led to the arrest of Japanese Prime Minister Kakuei Tanaka, as well as several other officials. Within Lockheed, board chairman Daniel Haughton and vice chairman and president Carl Kotchian resigned their posts on February 13, 1976. Tanaka was eventually tried and found guilty of violating foreign exchange control laws but was not charged with bribery, a more serious criminal offense. Crucially for Lockheed, the fallout from the scandal included the loss of a contract worth over $1 billion.

The Soviet Union at that time lacked a widebody airliner. Development of its own Ilyushin Il-86 was delayed; consequently, in the mid-1970s, the Soviets started negotiations to buy 30 TriStars and license-produce up to 100 a year. The talks collapsed as US President Jimmy Carter made human rights an important consideration in US foreign policy. The TriStar was also listed by the Coordinating Committee as embodying advanced technology forbidden for sale to potential enemies, which presented a serious obstacle to the export deal.

The last three airlines to operate the L-1011 in scheduled service were Brussels Airlines (codeshare with Hewa Bora Airways), Thai Sky Airlines, and Lloyd Aereo Boliviano, with final flights in August 2007, February 2008, and May 2008, respectively. In later years the L-1011 has been used by smaller start-up carriers, particularly in Africa and Asia. These operators mainly do their business in the ad hoc charter and wet leasing businesses. ATA Airlines (formerly known as American Trans Air) fleet included over 19 TriStars, but operations dwindled to only three L-1011-500s before the company's shutdown in April 2008.

=== Military ===
The TriStar has also been used as a military tanker and passenger/cargo aircraft. The British Royal Air Force had nine aircraft of four variants. The aircraft were six ex-British Airways and three Pan Am L-1011-500s. All of the aircraft served with No. 216 Squadron, and were based at RAF Brize Norton. The TriStar was replaced in RAF service by the Airbus A330 MRTT under the Future Strategic Tanker Aircraft program. 216 Squadron was officially disbanded on March 20, 2014, and flew its last sorties with the TriStar on March 24, 2014.

=== Other ===
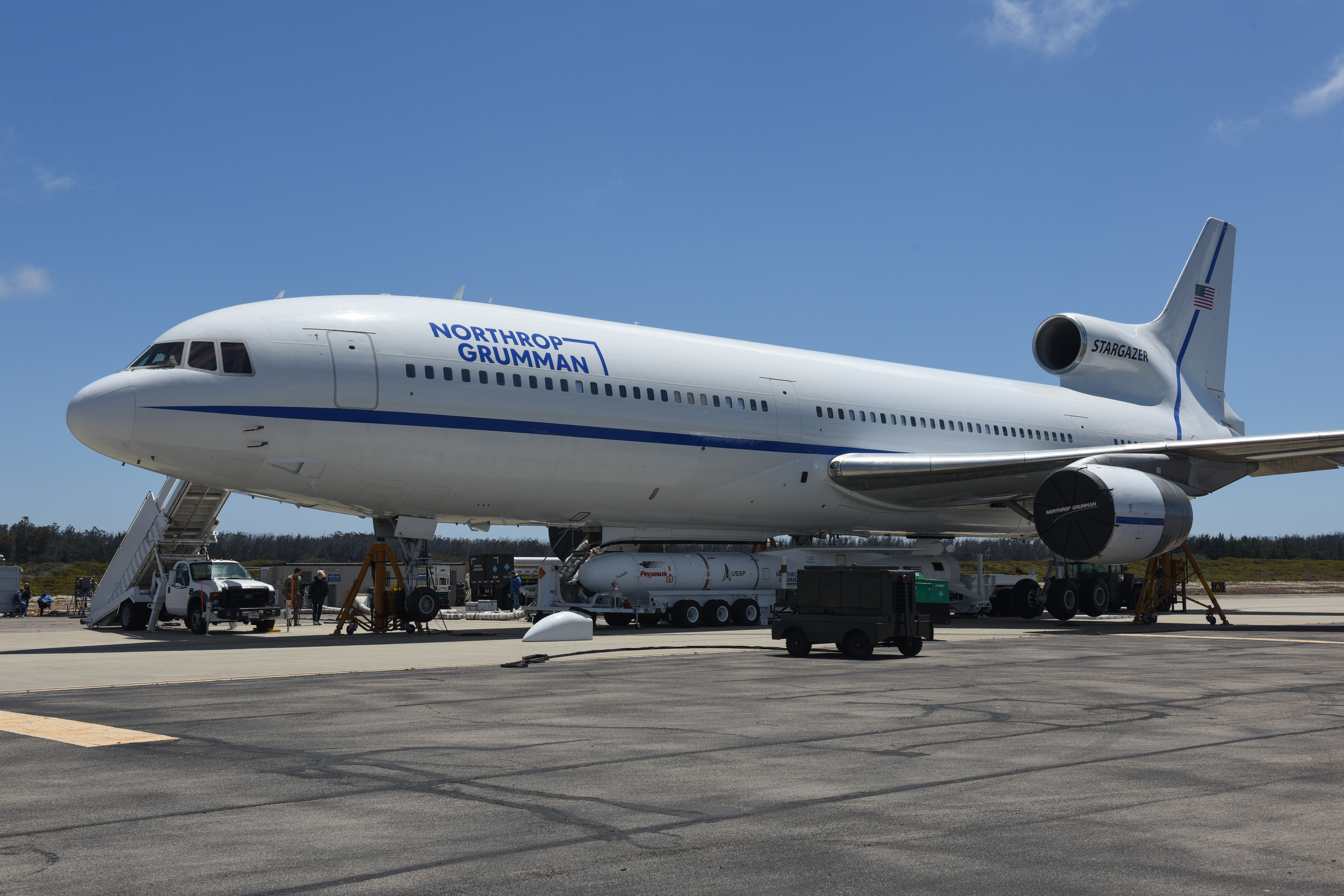
Northrop Grumman's L-1011-100 "Stargazer" preparing for a flight, with the fuselage lifted to make the room for mounting Pegasus XL rocket

In the early 1990s, Orbital Sciences began to use a converted L-1011-100 named Stargazer to launch Pegasus rockets into orbit around Earth. This venture effectively rendered the small Scout rocket obsolete. This aircraft was also used in support of the X-34 and X-43 programs. NASA performed aerodynamic research on Orbital Sciences' L-1011 in 1995. In 2014, three L-1011s in the world were airworthy. As of 2019, Stargazer is the only active L-1011.

== Variants ==
The earlier versions of the L-1011, such as the -1, -100, and -150 can be distinguished from the later models by the design of the middle engine nacelles. The earlier version nacelle has a round intake, whereas the later models have a small vertical fin between the bottom of the middle engine intake and the top of the fuselage.

The two L-1011 aircraft delivered to Pacific Southwest Airlines were configured with internal airstair doors that led into an entry hall in what was normally the forward lower baggage hold. This was to allow operations from airfields that did not have terminal buildings with jet bridges. These two aircraft were later in service with Aeroperú and Worldways Canada.

=== L-1011-1 ===
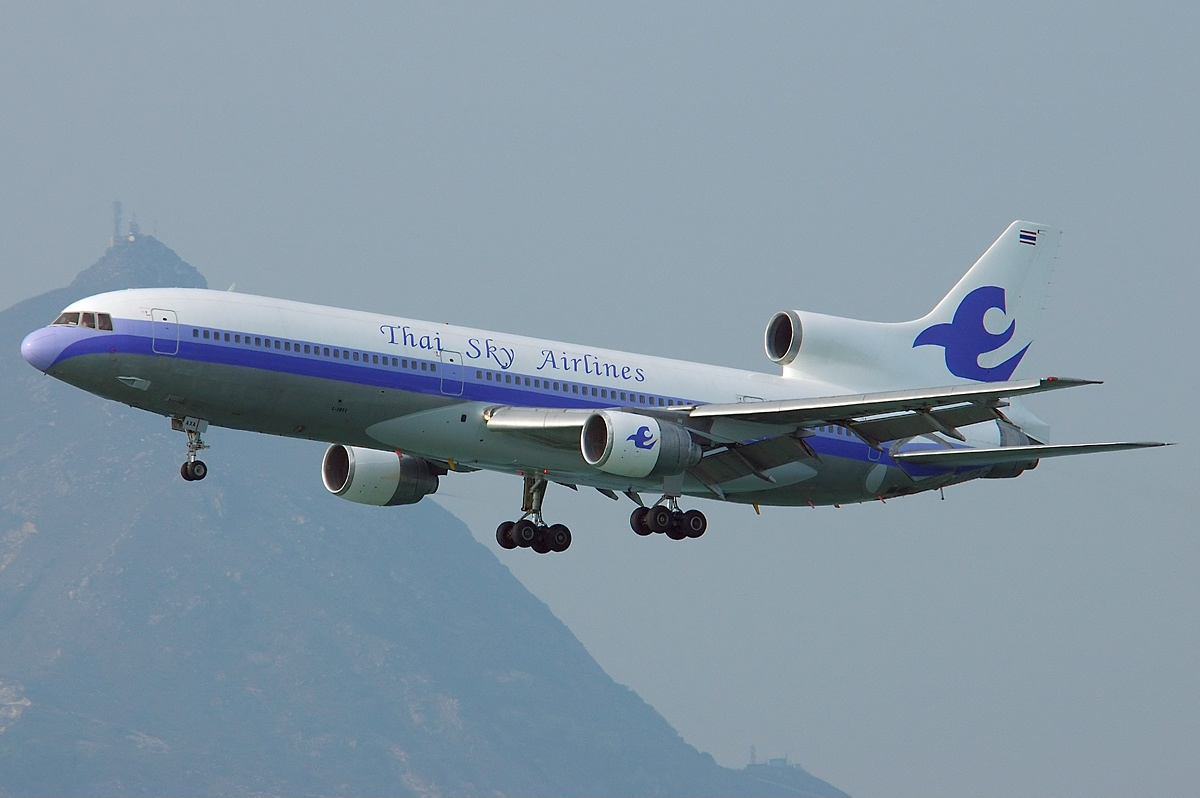
Thai Sky Airlines L-1011-1, 2005

The L-1011-1 (FAA certification L-1011-385-1) was the first production model of the L-1011, designed for short- and medium-range flights. This variant served as the basis for subsequent variants. This type was purchased by Air Canada, ANA, Cathay Pacific, Eastern, and other operators with regional trunk routes requiring a widebody aircraft. Pacific Southwest Airlines purchased two L-1011-1 models with lower deck seating. This variant was also one of the few widebodies to have the option for a full-height built-in airstair.

The L-1011-1 was first delivered to Eastern Air Lines on April 5, 1972. A total of 160 L-1011-1 TriStars were built before production ended in 1983, although the majority of these, 119 or 75% of the total, were completed during a four-year period from 1972 to 1975. Most sales of the L-1011-1 were to US operators, with just three airlines, Delta, Eastern, and TWA, taking delivery of 110 combined. A further two aircraft were placed with a fourth US airline, Pacific Southwest Airlines.

=== L-1011-100 ===
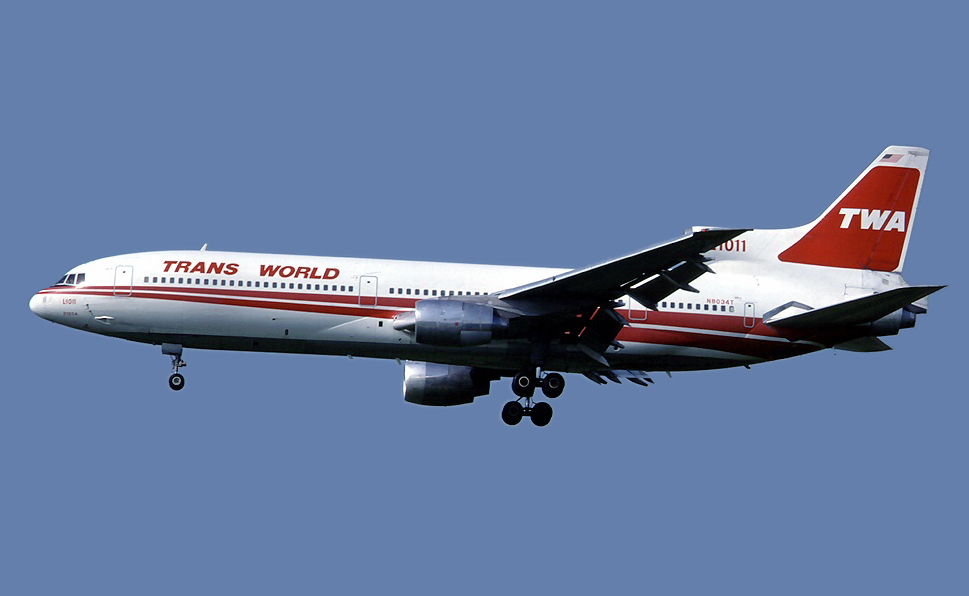
Trans World Airlines L-1011-100 TriStar

The L-1011-100 (FAA certification L-1011-385-1-14) was the second production model of the L-1011 and first flew in 1975 and featured a new center fuel tank and higher gross weights that increased the aircraft's range by nearly 930 miles (1,500 km; 810 nmi). Launch orders for the L-1011-100 were placed by Saudia and Cathay Pacific, for two each, in May 1974. Deliveries began in June 1975.

The variant was also purchased by several airlines with longer-range routes, such as TWA, Air Canada, and BEA (which merged with BOAC to form British Airways). The first two L-1011-100s (serial numbers 1110 and 1116) were delivered new to Saudia with the same fuel capacity as the L-1011-1 (FAA certification L-1011-385-1-14); these were later upgraded to L-1011-200 specification.

=== L-1011-50 ===
The L-1011-50 was an upgraded version of the L-1011-1 with an increase in maximum takeoff weight from 430,000 pounds (195,000 kg) to either 440,000 pounds (200,000 kg) or 450,000 pounds (204,000 kg). Fuel capacity was not increased. The -50 was available only as a conversion package for the L-1011-1 and was never built new.

=== L-1011-150 ===
The L-1011-150 was a development of the L-1011-1 with its maximum takeoff weight increased to 470,000 pounds (210,000 kg). It was available only as a conversion for the L-1011-1. The -150 involves the conversion of Group 1 and Group 2 L-1011-1 aircraft to an MTOW of 470,000 pounds (210,000 kg), an increase of 40,000 pounds (18,000 kg), about 10%, from the L-1011-1, giving the aircraft a slightly better range than the -50, but without the additional center-section fuel tank, less than the L-1011-100 aircraft. The first aircraft was converted by MBB at Lemwerder in Germany during the winter of 1988–89 and was subsequently handed over to Air Transat of Canada on May 11, 1989.

=== L-1011-200 ===
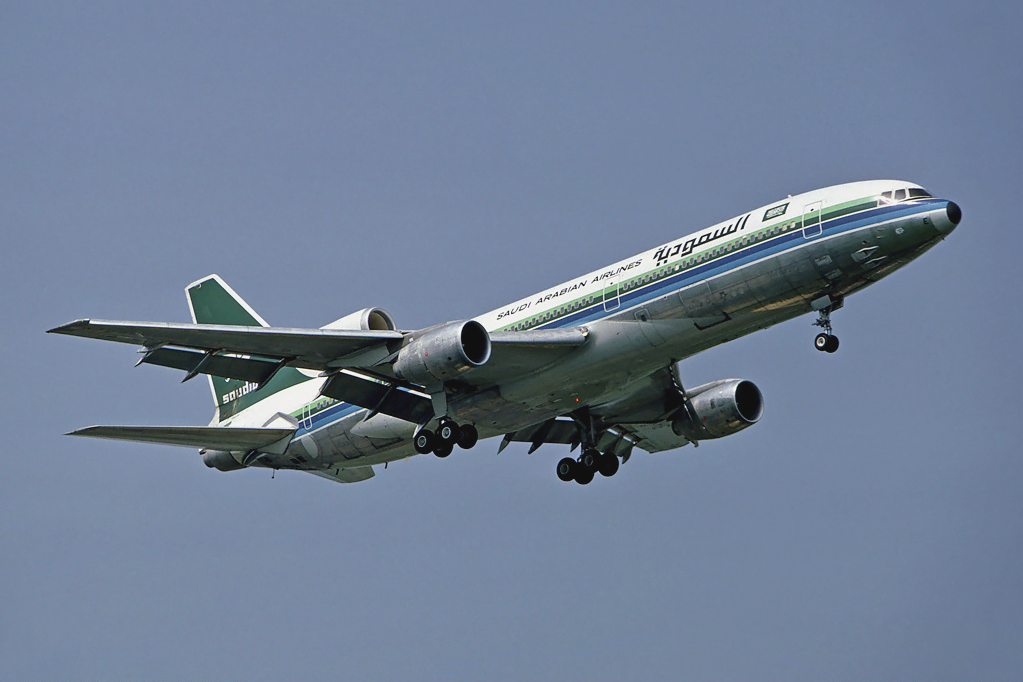
Saudia L-1011-200 TriStar, 1985

The L-1011-200 (FAA certification L-1011-385-1-15), the third production model of the L-1011, was introduced in 1976. Although otherwise similar to the -100, the -200 uses Rolls-Royce RB.211-524B engines to improve its performance in hot and high-altitude conditions. Gulf Air used -200 models to replace its earlier-generation Vickers VC10 fleet.

Other than the engines, the basic TriStar -200 is identical to the -100, with center-section fuel, having a MTOW of 466,000 pounds (211,000 kg), and fuel capacity of 26,400 US gallons (100,000 L; 22,000 imp gal) as the -100. An increase of gross weight to 474,000 pounds (215,000 kg) is possible, with the heavier aircraft offered by Lockheed as -200I or -200(Improved). Saudi Arabian Airlines (Saudia) was a launch customer for the -200 series and operated a sizable fleet until 1998. A total of 24 L-1011-200 aircraft were built new, with the first delivered to Saudia on May 28, 1977. Like other TriStar improvements, a conversion program has also been offered.

=== L-1011-250 ===
The L-1011-250 was an upgrade developed for late-model L-1011-1 aircraft and all L-1011-100 and L-1011-200 aircraft. The more powerful engines, lengthened wing, active-load-control ailerons and other systems that had been developed for the L-1011-500 were adapted into the baseline model. The changes resulted in increases in maximum takeoff weight to 510,000 pounds (230,000 kg) and fuel capacity from 23,600 US gal (89,335 L) to 31,632 US gal (119,735 L). This variant also used the upgraded RB.211-524B4I engine, which could be easily retrofitted to the existing RB.211-524B powerplants of the L-1011-200, but it required a re-engining on the L-1011-1 and L-1011-100, which used the original RB.211-22B. Although it could be applied to all L-1011 models, the upgrade was only undertaken by Delta on six late-model L-1011-1 aircraft.

=== L-1011-500 ===
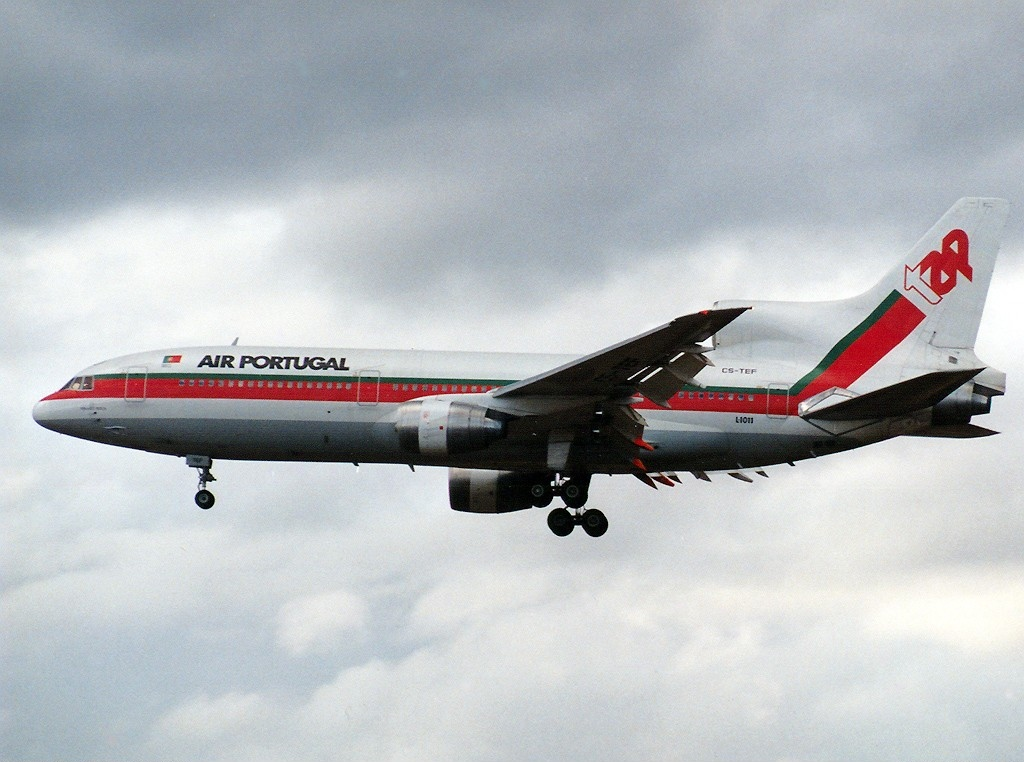
A TAP Air Portugal L-1011-500 in 1990

The L-1011-500 (FAA certification L-1011-385-3) was the last L-1011 variant to enter production. It was a longer-range variant first flight-tested in 1978. Its fuselage length was shortened by 14 feet (4.3 m) and MTOW increased to allow higher fuel loads. More powerful RB.211-524 engines, increased wingspan, active-load-control ailerons and other improved systems were features introduced by Lockheed to exploit newly available technologies in the late 1970s. The -500 variant was popular among international operators and formed a significant portion of the L-1011 fleet of Delta and British Airways. However, it entered service seven years after the similar DC-10-30 entered service.

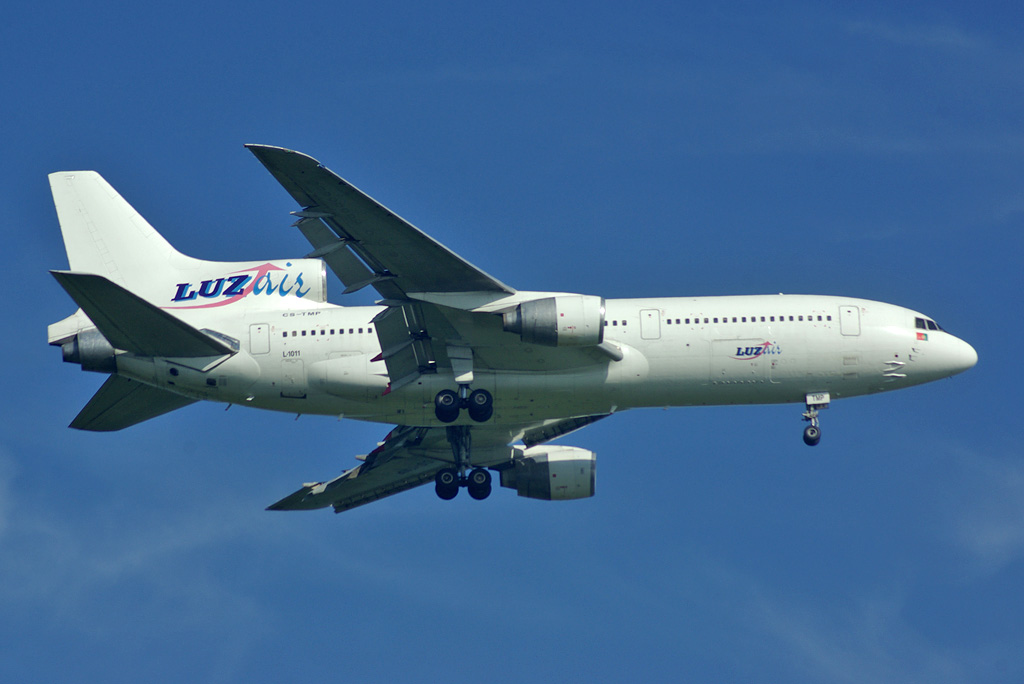
Luzair L-1011-500 Tri Star

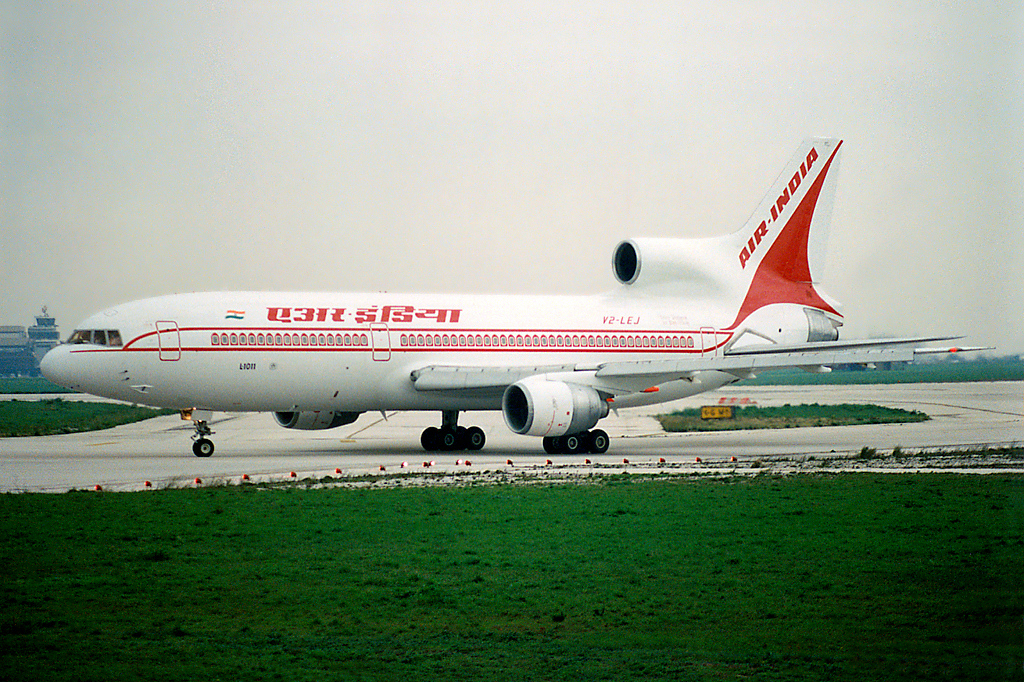
An Air India Lockheed L-1011-500 TriStar at Lisbon Airport

The TriStar 500 first flew on October 16, 1978, with the first delivery to British Airways on April 27, 1979. It entered service with British Airways on May 7, 1979, flying between London and Abu Dhabi. The last L-1011 produced was a TriStar 500, operated by the Las Vegas Sands shortly before production ended in 1984.

==== Dimensions ====
The TriStar 500 has an overall length of 164 feet 2 inches (50.04 m) and wingspan increased to 164 feet 4 inches (50.09 m) (early TriStar versions originally had the TriStar 1 wing with a span of 155 feet 4 inches (47.35 m)).

==== Flying surfaces ====
Lockheed developed some aerodynamic improvements for the TriStar 500 which included a modified wing-to-body fairing, a fillet below the central intake, extended wingtips, and "active ailerons" or active control system (ACS). The new fairing reduced drag, while the fillet reduced noise in the rear cabin. The wingtip extensions increased aspect ratio, thus reducing induced drag, but resulted in increased bending. The ACS developed to solve this, provided gust alleviation, improving ride during flight, reduced fuel burn, and increased fatigue life.

Earlier TriStar 500s were delivered with the standard wing; these were later retrofitted with ailerons and extended wingtips. Pan Am was the first customer to order the -500 with the extended wingtips and active ailerons. Aircraft serial number 1176, the first for Pan Am, was the first TriStar 500 to be fitted with them as standard.

==== Powerplant ====
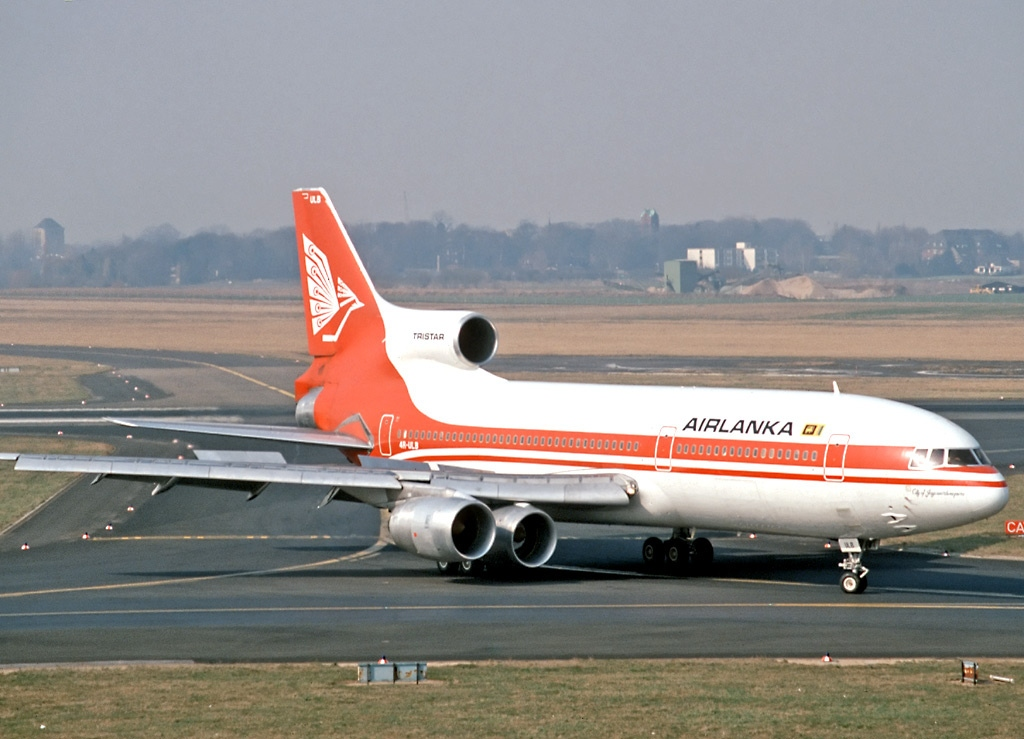
An Air Lanka L-1011-500 TriStar ferrying an extra engine

The TriStar 500 is equipped with higher thrust RB.211-524B engines. Initially rated at 50,000 lbf (220 kN) thrust each, the higher-thrust 53,000 lbf (240 kN) -524B4 Improved (also referred to as the -524B4I) later became available, which also had improved fuel efficiency.

==== Performance ====
Originally certified with an MTOW of 496,000 pounds (225,000 kg), an increased MTOW of 504,000 pounds (229,000 kg) was later certified in 1979, and all earlier production aircraft were certified at this weight. A further increase, to 510,000 pounds (230,000 kg), is also available, and most TriStar 500s are thought to have had this increase. Standard fuel capacity is 31,600 US gallons (26,300 imp gal; 120,000 L), giving the TriStar 500 a range of about 5,200 nautical miles (6,000 mi; 9,600 km) with 246 passengers and baggage.

==== Cabin ====
The TriStar 500's maximum passenger capacity is 315, although no aircraft were operated with that number of seats. A typical two-class layout might include 21 First Class and 229 Economy Class for a maximum of 250 passengers. More spacious three-class layouts used on longer routes include 233 with 12 First Class, 32 Business Class, and 189 Economy Class with Delta Air Lines. The aircraft is equipped with six exits, two fewer than the long-body TriStars, thus reducing the exit limit maximum.

== Operators ==
Only one L-1011 TriStar is in service as of 2025, the Stargazer, which is used as the mother ship for the Pegasus, an air-launched orbital rocket operated by Northrop Grumman.

== Accidents and incidents ==
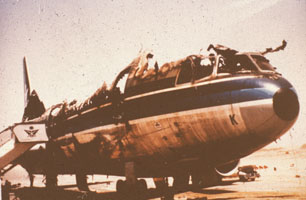
The burnt out fuselage of the TriStar involved in Saudia Flight 163. After carrying out an emergency landing at Riyadh International Airport due to an in-flight cargo fire, a failure by the crew to carry out the emergency evacuation procedures led to all 301 people on board perishing from the flames and smoke.

As of December 2011, the L-1011 has been involved in 35 aviation incidents, including 10 hull-loss accidents, with 540 fatalities. Of the four pioneering widebody aircraft (Boeing 747, McDonnell Douglas DC-10, L-1011, and Airbus A300/A310 family), the Lockheed L-1011 had comparatively few accidents and a better safety record than its competitors.

- On December 29, 1972, Eastern Air Lines Flight 401, an L-1011, crashed in the Florida Everglades as a result of the flight crew's failure to monitor the flight instruments during a malfunction of the landing gear position indicator system. The crash resulted in 101 fatalities, and was the subject of two TV movies, Crash and The Ghost of Flight 401. It was also the subject of a Mayday episode.
- On April 19, 1974, an L-1011 owned by TWA with the fleet number of 11007 caught fire at Logan Airport in Boston. It had landed four hours previously and there was no one on board. It was subsequently written off.
- On April 12, 1977, Delta Air Lines Flight 1080, on takeoff from San Diego, had a left stabilizer jammed undetected in the full trailing-edge-up position. This failure resulted in a large noseup and rolling moment that almost exceeded the capability of the flight controls. The airplane was just about to stall in the clouds when Captain Jack McMahan, with unusual insight, reduced power on the wing engines and began using the throttles to supplement the remaining flight controls, using differential and collective engine thrust. Cabin crew moved all the passengers forward in the cabin to redistribute weight and help get the nose down. Steve Heidt, the flight engineer, said, "It probably didn't help much, but in that situation, we figured every little bit would help." All the way from San Diego to Los Angeles, the aircraft flew with its pitch controlled by differential thrust between tail and wing engines, while the left roll tendency was compensated by wing differential thrust, and made a successful emergency landing in Los Angeles. According to an incident analysis by Warren VanderBurgh, comprehensive crew training played a critical role in control recovery.
- On August 19, 1980, a fire destroyed the L-1011-200 used for Saudia Flight 163 on the ground after the pilots made an emergency landing at Riyadh's former International Airport due to fire in the rear of the aircraft. Delays in initiating the evacuation of the aircraft led to the deaths of all 301 occupants.
- On December 23, 1980, Saudia Flight 162, an L-1011, had a tire explode and penetrate the passenger cabin whilst in flight. The aircraft lost cabin pressure and two passengers were ejected through a hole in the cabin floor. The aircraft was later repaired and returned to service.
- On September 22, 1981, Eastern Air Lines Flight 935 departed Newark, New Jersey, and suffered an uncontained failure of its number two (tail) engine at 14,500 feet (4,400 m), while en route to San Juan, Puerto Rico. The fragments from that engine damaged three of its four hydraulic systems resulting in fluid loss in them. The rudder pedals also jammed. The fragments struck but did not puncture the lines for the other hydraulic system; the captain was able to safely land the aircraft at John F. Kennedy International Airport, with some limited use of the outboard spoilers, the inboard ailerons and the horizontal stabilizer, plus differential engine power of the remaining two engines. There were no injuries.
- On May 5, 1983, Eastern Air Lines Flight 855, an L-1011 with registration N334EA, while flying from Miami to Nassau, shut down the number 2 engine due to low oil pressure and began a return to Miami. Both of the remaining engines later failed. Without power, Flight 855 descended from 13,000 to 4,000 feet (4,000 to 1,200 m) before the number 2 engine was restarted and the aircraft landed in Miami without injuries. Incorrect engine maintenance had led to the loss of oil on all three engines.
- On April 5, 1984, a Saudia Lockheed L-1011 TriStar on final approach to Damascus from Jeddah was hijacked by a Syrian national. The hijacker demanded to be taken to Istanbul, Turkey, but changed his mind and requested to go to Stockholm. After landing in Istanbul to refuel, the pilot pushed the hijacker out the emergency exit whereupon he was arrested.

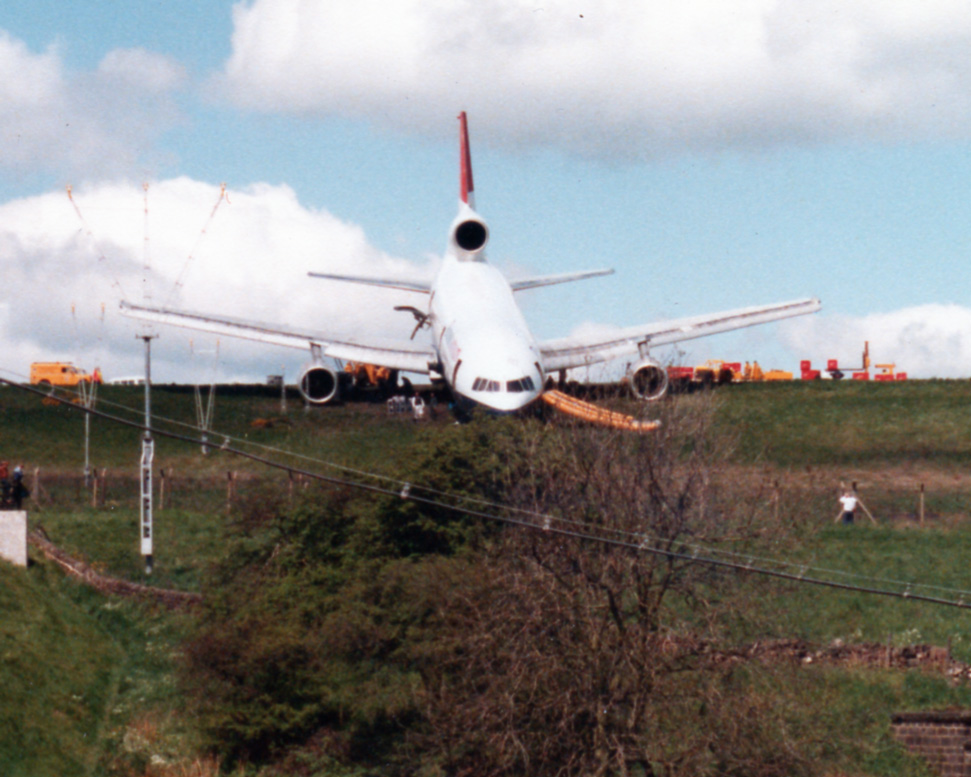
A British Airtours TriStar overran the runway at Leeds Bradford International Airport in 1985.

- On May 27, 1985, British Airtours Flight 101, registration G-BBAI, from Palma Airport, Mallorca, Spain overran the runway on landing at Leeds Bradford International Airport, West Yorkshire, United Kingdom. 12 of the 412 people on board suffered minor injuries when exiting down steep rear ramps. The aircraft was severely damaged, but was eventually repaired and returned to service.
- On August 2, 1985, Delta Air Lines Flight 191, an L-1011, crashed while approaching Dallas/Fort Worth International Airport in microburst conditions. Eight of 11 crew members and 128 of the 152 passengers on board died, as well as one person on the ground after his vehicle was struck by the L-1011.
- On October 18, 1985, a Jordanian Airlines L-1011 experienced an inflight fire at 24,000 feet (7,300 m) while on approach to Singapore. The fire burned through the rear pressure bulkhead, causing explosive depressurization of the cabin. The air rushing out of the cabin extinguished the fire, saving the aircraft. All 118 passengers and crew survived. The aircraft was later repaired and placed back into service.
- On May 3, 1986, Air Lanka Flight 512 (now SriLankan Airlines), an L-1011, was destroyed on the ground in Colombo, Sri Lanka, after a bomb exploded in the rear cargo hold, severing the tail and resulting in 21 deaths.
- On June 28, 1991, LTU International L-1011 registration D-AERI, suffered an interior fire during maintenance in a hangar at Düsseldorf Airport. Four engineers escaped injury, and the aircraft was declared a total loss.
- On July 30, 1992, TWA Flight 843, an L-1011, had its takeoff aborted by the captain after liftoff from John F. Kennedy International Airport, in response to a false stall warning. The aircraft landed too hard, breaking a wing spar and starting a fire. All 292 passengers and crew evacuated safely, with only 10 minor injuries. The airliner was destroyed by fire.
- On August 23, 1995, Delta Air Lines Flight 157, an L-1011 TriStar 1, suffered a rapid decompression after the pressure bulkhead failed. The flight crew initiated an emergency descent to 14,000 feet (4,300 m), and the plane landed safely at Los Angeles International Airport with no deaths or injuries to the 226 passengers or 10 crew. The aircraft was substantially damaged and later written off.

== Aircraft on display ==
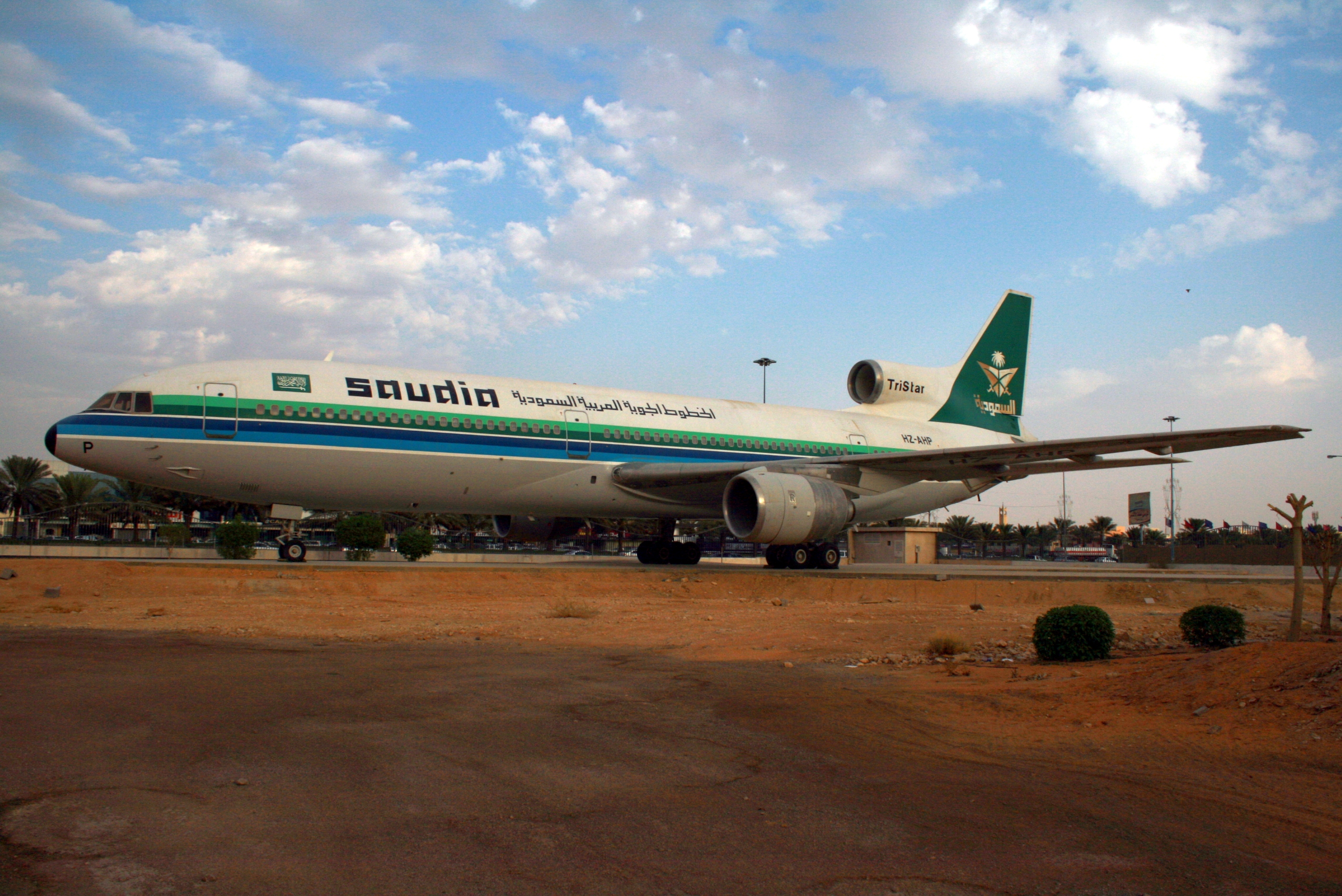
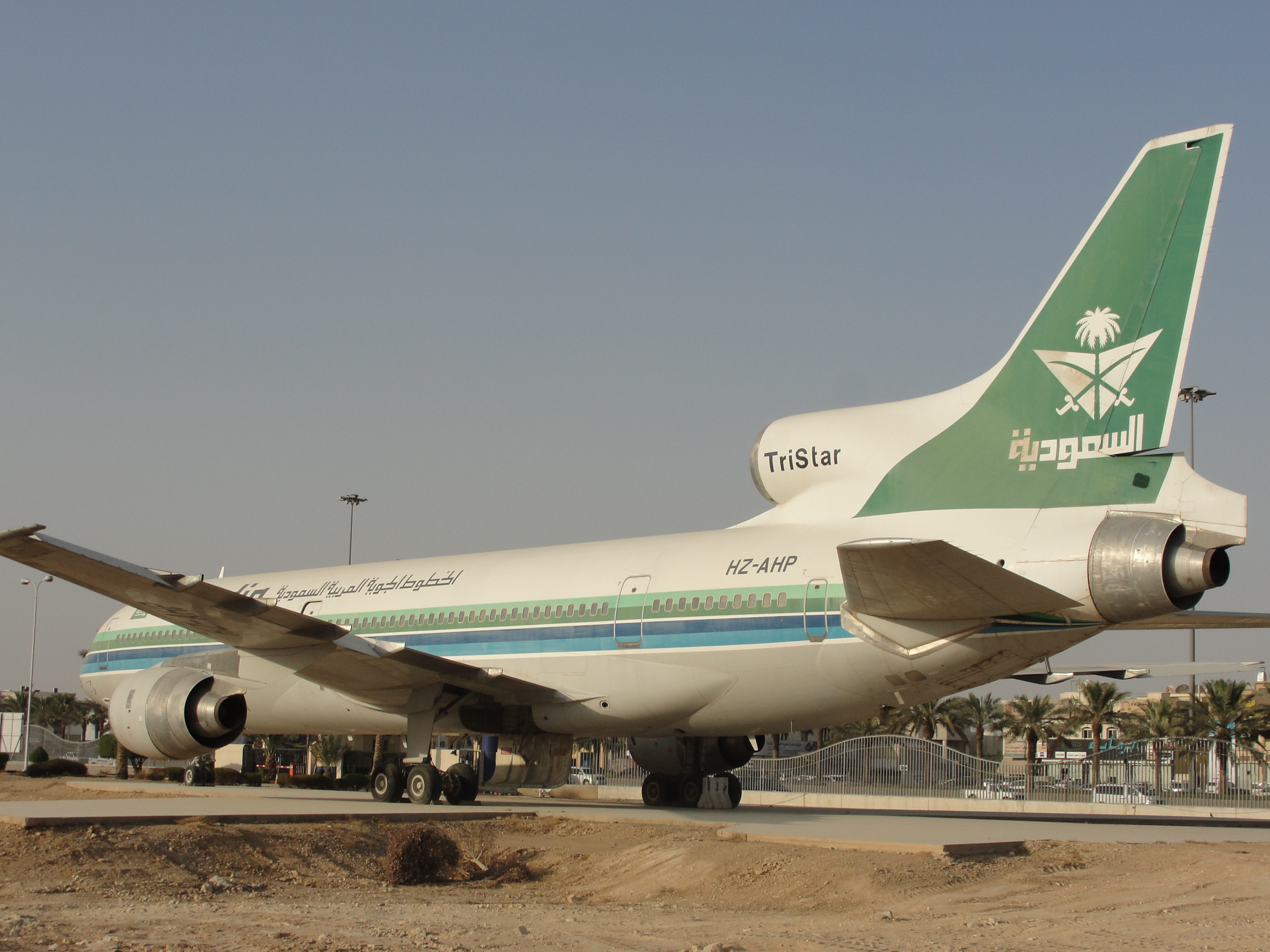
Tristar at the Royal Saudi Air Force Museum, Riyadh
- N1011 – L-1011-1 on display at the Delta Flight Museum in Atlanta, Georgia. This is the forward upper fuselage of the prototype aircraft and is painted in Delta colors.
- C-FTNA – L-1011-1 formerly on display at the Lyon–Saint-Exupéry Airport in Lyon, France. After it was damaged in a hailstorm operating as Air Transat Flight 906, it returned to Lyon and was written off. Before being scrapped in May 2026, it was used for emergency training.
- N31019 – L-1011-50 on display at the National Airline History Museum in Kansas City, Missouri, at the Charles B. Wheeler Downtown Airport. Its original operator was Trans World Airlines.
- TT-DWE – L-1011-100 on display at the Emirates National Auto Museum in Abu Dhabi, United Arab Emirates. This aircraft was originally delivered to British Airways.
- HZ-AHP – L-1011-200 on display originally in the former Saudia paint job as a gate guardian at the Royal Saudi Air Force Museum in Riyadh, Saudi Arabia. In 2018, the plane was repainted to celebrate the 88th Saudi National Day. Since 2019, the plane has been repainted to promote Saudi Vision 2030.
- 9Y-TGN – L-1011-500 on display at the Chaguaramas Military History and Aerospace Museum in Chaguaramas, Trinidad. This aircraft was previously operated by BWIA West Indies Airways.
- N700TS – L-1011-1 formerly on display at the Airline History Museum at Charles B. Wheeler Downtown Airport in Kansas City, Missouri, United States. Originally delivered to TWA (N31019) in 1974, the aircraft made its final ferry flight from Roswell, New Mexico to the museum in January 2010. Following a long legal dispute and eviction of the museum, the aircraft was forced out and components were salvaged to support the operational Stargazer launcher. It was scrapped in May 2026.
- N910TE – L-1011-1 on display with TriStar Experience at Kansas City International Airport. It was previously in storage in Tucson after being retired by the Flying Hospital group as P4-MED in favor of an MD-10. N910TE is the only L-1011-1 with working RB.211-22B engines.
- HS-AXE (Thai Sky Airlines), formerly N718DA (Delta) L-1011-1 was converted to a bar/restaurant located in Bangkok, Thailand.
- XU-700 (Angel Air), formerly N327EA (Eastern Air Lines) L-1011-1 was converted to a coffee shop located near Pattaya, Thailand.
- 9Q-CHC (Hewa Bora Airways), MSN 1209 formerly C-GAGI (Air Canada) and N767DA (Delta) L-1011-385-3 TriStar 500 moved to Parc de la Vallée de la Nsele near Kinshasa, Democratic Republic of the Congo where it will be converted to a bar/restaurant.
- CS-TMP (Luzair) MSN 1248 formerly JY-AGJ (Royal Jordanian) L-1011-385-3 TriStar 500 moved to Underwater Military Museum Dive Site, Aqaba, Jordan on 26 August 2019 for use as a tourist dive site.
- N102CK (Gee Bee Airways), MSN 1198, in Kitty Hawk basic colours, formerly G-BHBM (British Airways) L-1011 TriStar 200F, stored at the apron of Kavala Airport LGKV/KVA - Greece, since November 2004.
- N388LS, the former Las Vegas Sands L-1011-500, was damaged beyond repair in 2013 by floods while it was parked at Bangkok Airport. In 2018, the aircraft's body was disassembled and reassembled for display at Chic Chic Market, Nong Khai.
- 9L-LFB, the former All Nippon Airways JA8522, was last operated by Air Rum until 2010. It was stored on a beach in Cotonou, Benin, since 2014, and features a preserved interior. Guests can tour the aircraft's interior by paying an entry fee.

== Specifications ==
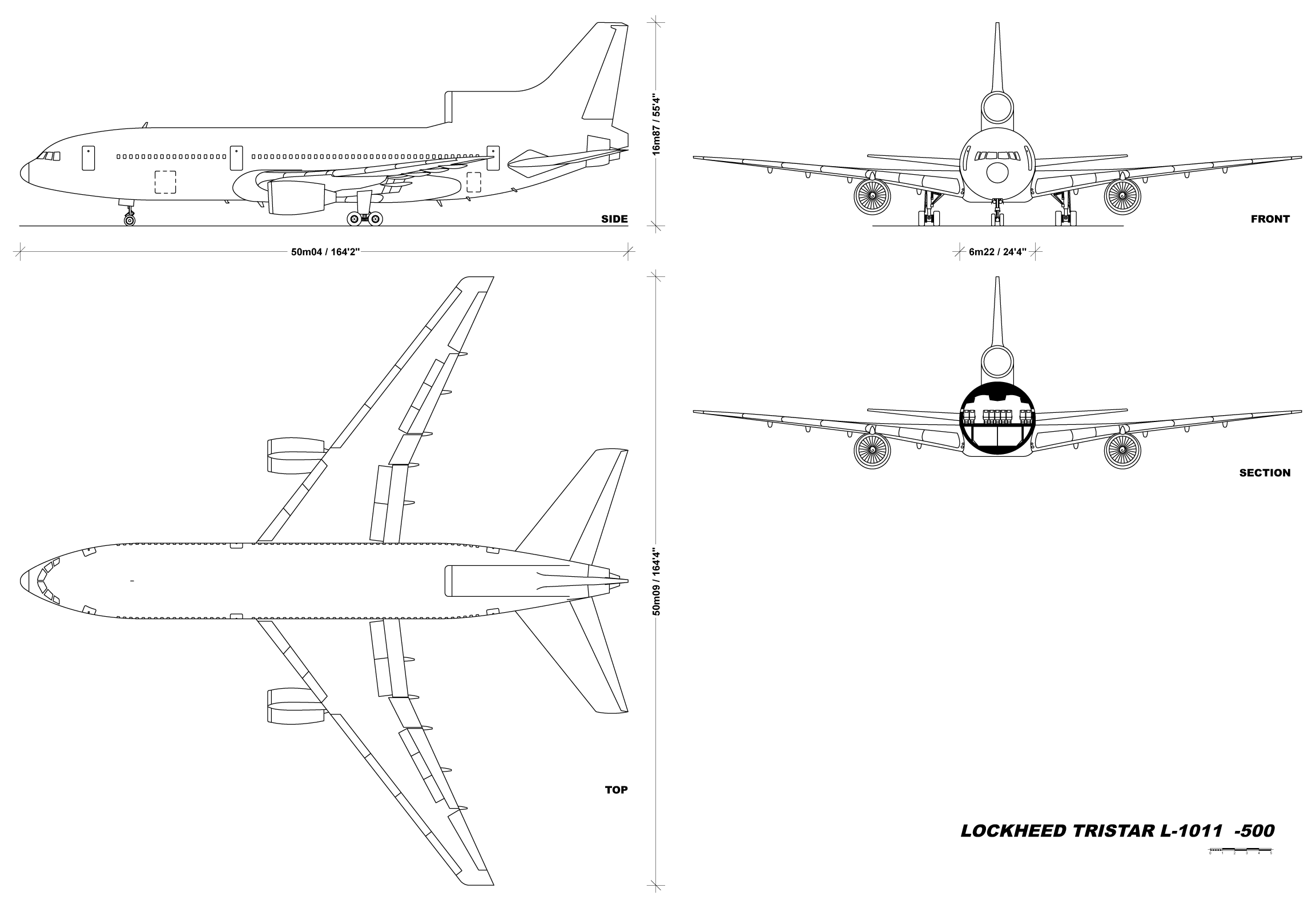
Lockheed L-1011-500 TriStar blueprint drawing

L-1011 Specifications
Variant	L-1011-1	L-1011-200	L-1011-500
Cockpit crew	Three		
Seating	256 (mixed-class)		246 (mixed-class)
Exit limit	400 (Note: 10-abreast)		330
Interior width	18 ft 11 in (5.8 m)		
Length	177 ft 8 1/2 in (54.2 m)		164 ft 2 1/2 in (50.1 m)
Wingspan	155 ft 4 in (47.3 m)		164 ft 4 in (50.1 m)
Height	55 ft 4 in (16.9 m)		
Wing area	3,456 ft^{2} (321 m^{2})		3,541 ft^{2} (329 m^{2})
MTOW	430,000 lb (195,045 kg)	466,000 lb (211,374 kg)	510,000 lb (231,332 kg)
OEW	241,700 lb (109,633 kg)	248,400 lb (112,672 kg)	245,400 lb (111,312 kg)
Fuel capacity	23,814 US gal (90,146 L; 19,829 imp gal)	26,502 US gal (100,321 L; 22,068 imp gal)	31,642 US gal (119,778 L; 26,347 imp gal)
Engines (×3)	Rolls-Royce RB.211-22	Rolls-Royce RB.211-524	
Thrust (×3)	42,000 lb_{f} (186,825 N)	50,000 lb_{f} (222,411 N)	
Mmo	Mach 0.9 (516 kn; 956 km/h; 594 mph)		
Max speed (Note: 26,200 ft (8,000 m))	539 kn (998 km/h; 620 mph)		
Cruise (Note: 30,000 ft (9,100 m))	520 kn (963 km/h; 598 mph)	515 kn (954 km/h; 593 mph)	525 kn (972 km/h; 604 mph)
Stall (Note: max. landing weight, flaps and gear down)	108 kn (200 km/h; 124 mph)	110 kn (204 km/h; 127 mph)	114 kn (211 km/h; 131 mph)
Range (Note: max. passengers + baggage)	2,680 nmi (4,963 km; 3,084 mi)	3,600 nmi (6,667 km; 4,143 mi)	5,345 nmi (9,899 km; 6,151 mi)
Ferry range (Note: max. fuel)	4,250 nmi (7,871 km; 4,891 mi)	4,935 nmi (9,140 km; 5,679 mi)	6,090 nmi (11,279 km; 7,008 mi)
Ceiling	42,000 ft (12,802 m)		43,000 ft (13,106 m)

== Notable appearances in media ==
- The band El Ten Eleven, a Los Angeles post-rock duo, derives its name from the L-1011.
- The parody artist Bob Rivers, wrote a song called "Beat Up Old Jetliner" that mentions the L-1011.

== See also ==
Related development

- Lockheed TriStar (RAF)
- Stargazer (aircraft)

Aircraft of comparable role, configuration, and era

- Airbus A300
- Airbus A310
- Boeing 747SP
- Ilyushin Il-86
- McDonnell Douglas DC-10

Related lists

- List of Lockheed aircraft
- List of jet airliners
