= Zaporizhzhia International Airport =

Zaporizhzhia International Airport Міжнародний аеропорт «Запоріжжя»
- Brandmark

- IATA: OZH; ICAO: UKDE

Summary
- Airport type: Public
- Operator: UE International Airport Zaporizhzhia
- Serves: Zaporizhzhia
- Location: Zaporizhzhia, Zaporizhzhia Oblast, Ukraine
- Closed: February 2022; 4 years ago
- Elevation AMSL: 373 ft / 114 m
- Coordinates: 47°52′01″N 035°18′57″E
- Website: ozh.aero

Maps
- Location of airport in Ukraine OZH (Ukraine)
- Interactive map of Zaporizhzhia International Airport

Runways
Direction	Length		Surface
Direction	ft	m	Surface
02/20	8,210	2,502	Concrete

Statistics (2021)
- Passengers: ▲617 000

Zaporizhzhia International Airport (IATA: OZH, ICAO: UKDE) (Ukrainian: Міжнародний аеропорт «Запоріжжя») is the international airport that serves Zaporizhzhia, Ukraine, one of three airfields around the city. The aircraft engine factory Motor Sich has its base here. In May 2020, the airport was extended with a new terminal with a capacity of 400 passengers. The airport is also home to the Zaporizhzhia State Aircraft Repair Plant (ZDARZ).

== History ==
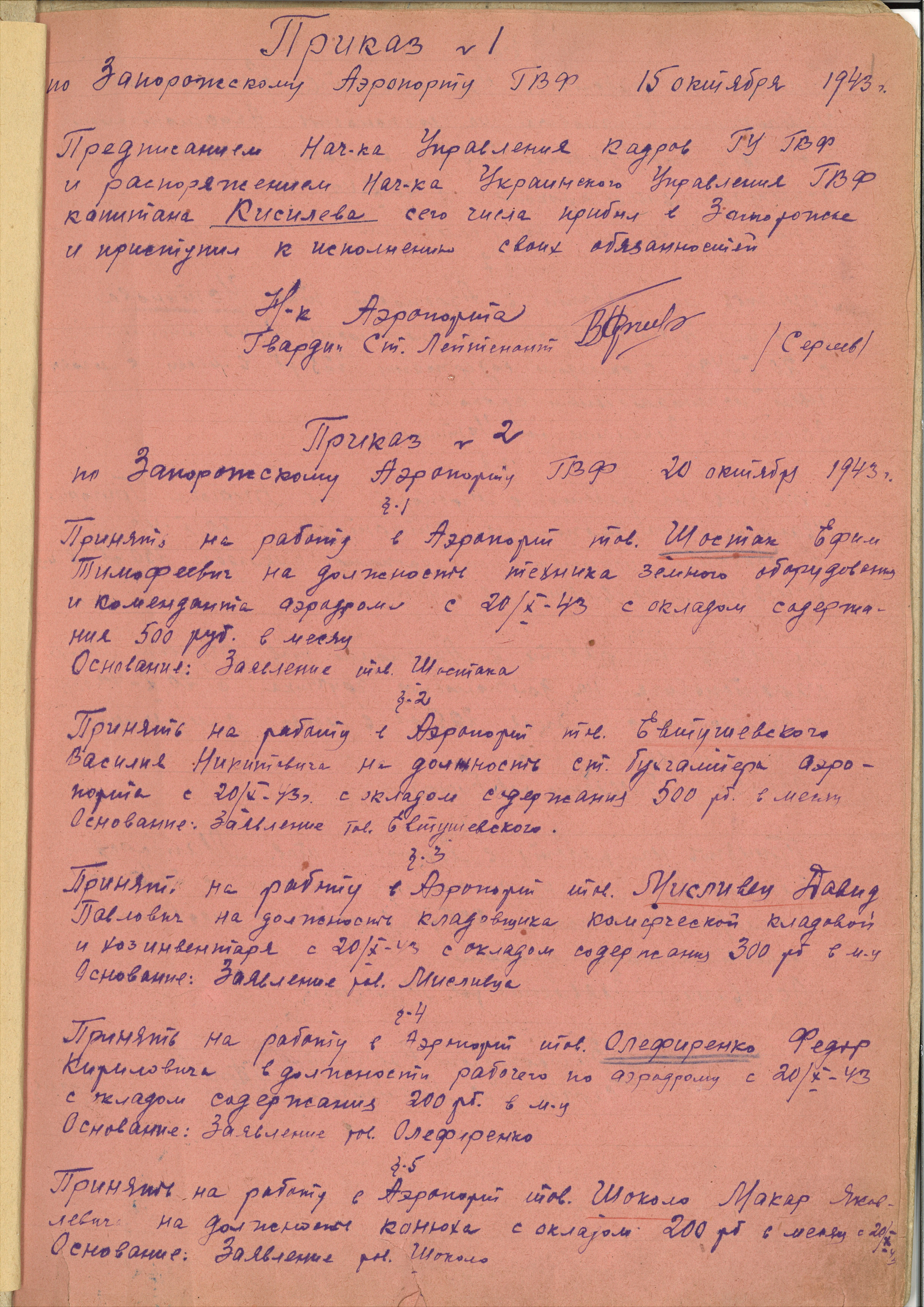
Order No. 1 on the enterprise

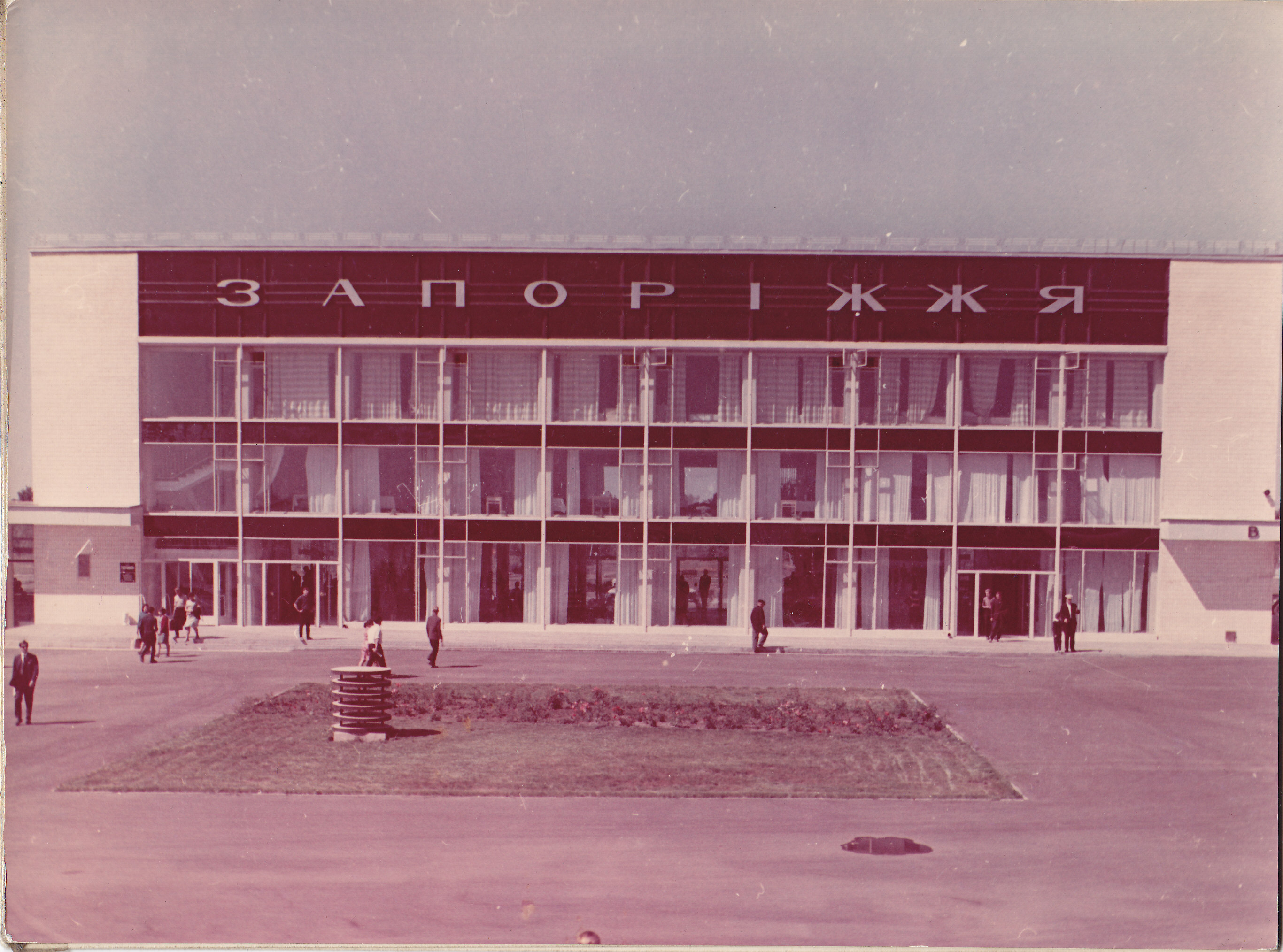
Airport building in the 1960s

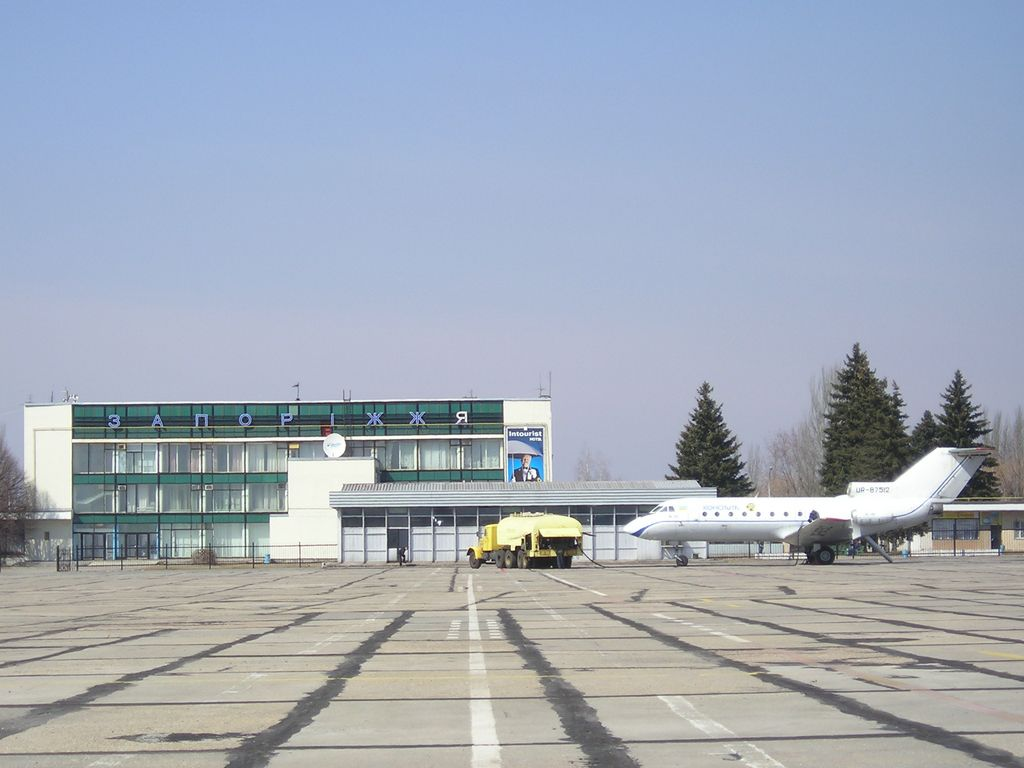
The former airport building

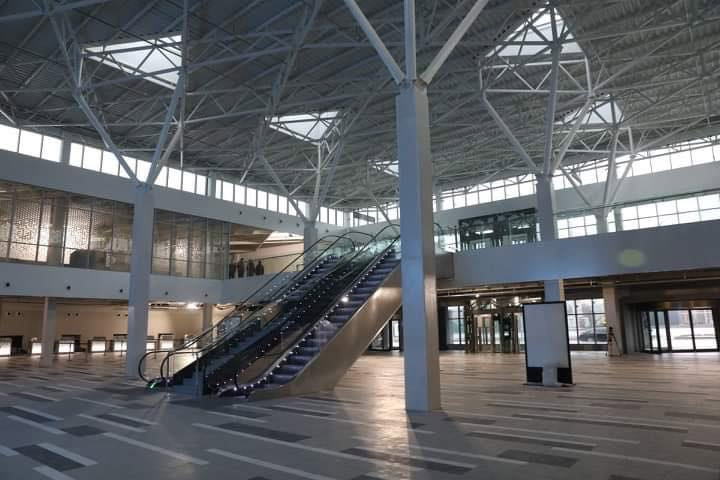
Interior of the current terminal

The airport was established 15 October 1943. Immediately after liberation of Zaporizhzhia from the Nazi troops, an order No. 1 was issued for the enterprise according to which the first head of the Zaporizhzhia airport was appointed. At that time, the airport infrastructure was located on the eastern outskirts of the city.

After the end of the war in 1945, the airport began to operate flights between Zaporizhzhia-Moscow-Zaporizhzhia, and then Zaporizhzhia-Kyiv-Zaporizhzhia.

In 1964, an artificial runway was put into operation at the current location of the airport. In 1965, the construction of the airport terminal was completed

Until the beginning of the 1990s, the airport was rapidly developing; in 70–80 years, up to 150 flights were carried out, which linked several dozen cities of the then existing USSR.

In 1981, the last time in the 20th century, a major overhaul of the runway at the airport was carried out;

In the 1990s, a significant decline in airport production rates was recorded. This happened in the face of the extremely difficult economic and political situation in the country. During the 1990s and early 2000s, the airport did not actually evolve due to lack of own funds and lack of financial assistance from the state or private investors.

== Current airport ==
The situation began to change in 2013, when the airport changed its ownership form, and then it was transferred to the local territorial community. At the session of the Municipal Council, the Municipal target program "Ensuring proper and uninterrupted work of the Utility Enterprise "Zaporizhzhia International Airport" was approved. It was this year that there was a significant increase in airport production rates. In particular, an increase of 30.1% of adopted aircraft was registered (a total of 1936 units), as well as an increase in passenger traffic by 40.6% (to 79 845 passengers). In the same year, three intro-scopes for the inspection of baggage of passengers as well as a ring carrier for baggage delivery were purchased.

From 2015, the airport began to actively cooperate with major international and Ukrainian carriers – in particular, Turkish Airlines, Pegasus Airlines and AtlasGlobal.

In 2016, the Zaporizhzhia Municipal Council and the airport management developed and began to implement airport development and maintenance measures. For this purpose, ₴12.5 million from the city budget and ₴19.6 million from the airport's own funds were spent. A major repair of the terminal for domestic airlines has been completed, repairs of the terminal for international airlines have been completed, projects for the reconstruction of the lightning navigational aids of the runway and radio equipment have been completed, several units of necessary equipment have been purchased. In the same year, an agreement on cooperation with the "International Airlines of Ukraine" was signed, and the airport was recognized as the best airport in Ukraine. In February, the airport was included in the State Target Program for the Development of Airports for the period up to 2023. In its framework it is planned to allocate more than US$611 million for the airport support.

In 2017, the contracts were signed with Anda Air and Bravo Airlines. Also this year the first major repairs of the runway for 36 years were carried out, about ₴20 million were spent on repairs.

In 2018, the enterprise management will join the cooperation of one of the largest European carriers – LOT Polish Airlines. Due to this, for the first time in the history of Zaporizhzhia the regular flights to the countries of Europe began to operate from the local airport. The first of these was the Zaporizhzhia-Warsaw flight. The Ukrainian low-cost airline SkyUp became another new carrier that started cooperation with the airport. Also this year, the airport representatives are participating for the first time in the Routes Europe 2018 Forum, one of the largest air aviation forums in the world, allowing for meetings between the most influential players in the airline market.

=== 2020 new terminal ===
In 2016, the concept of a new terminal at the airport was presented. On 6 September 2017, the Government of Ukraine approved design estimates for the construction of a new passenger terminal. According to the documents, the construction should be completed within 24 months from the start date of construction, the total cost of all works, at the time of approval of the design and estimate documentation, amounted to ₴543 million. Also, for the maintenance of the terminal, construction of a boiler house, a pumping station, a complex transformer substation, supply of power grids, sewage networks, water supply, heat and gas supply, communication systems, and rainwater drainage is planned. The construction of a new terminal should significantly increase the volume of passenger traffic and allow significant development of the transport infrastructure of the entire region. The executor of the work was the company "Altis-Construction", which won the tender with a proposal of ₴529.85 million.

On 14 December 2017, the construction of a new terminal began. Its area is 12,545 m^{2}, the capacity should be 400 passengers per hour (250 on international lines and 150 on domestic ones). The start of the construction of a new airport terminal in Zaporizhzhia.

On 14 December 2018, the airport was authorized to take a loan from state-owned banks amounting to ₴280 million. This money should be directed to construction work at the new airport terminal. An enterprise must return the sum at the expense of its own profit. The state of construction of the new terminal of the airport as of February 2019. At the end of 2018, a completely built terminal framework and work on the roof covering was completed. The work on the installation of glass panels are coming to the end. The laying of communications to the terminal building continues. The installation of escalators has begun. According to official data, on 17 December 2018, 50% of all construction works were completed. The terminal rated capacity will be 1 million passengers per year.

On 13 May 2020, the new terminal was completed, but due to the COVID-19 pandemic, it was not yet opened. On 19 October 2020, the terminal was opened for domestic flights. The first flight went to Kyiv operated by SkyUp Airlines. International flights were scheduled to begin on 20 October 2020.

On 24 February 2022, Ukraine closed its airspace to civilian flights due to the Russian invasion of Ukraine. The airport came under attack several times from Russian forces during the course of the war. On 26 May 2024, the new terminal was destroyed in a Russian missile attack.

== Airlines and destinations ==
The following airlines operate regular scheduled and charter services at the airport:

As of 24 February 2022, all passenger flights were suspended indefinitely.

Airlines	Destinations
Austrian Airlines	Vienna
LOT Polish Airlines	Warsaw–Chopin
Motor Sich Airlines	Kyiv–Zhuliany; Seasonal: Burgas
Pegasus Airlines	Istanbul–Sabiha Gökçen; Seasonal: Bodrum
Skyline Express	Seasonal charter: Antalya, Dalaman, Sharm El Sheikh
SkyUp	Tel Aviv; Seasonal: Barcelona, Batumi, Burgas, Larnaca, Odesa, Prague, Rimini, Tirana, Tivat; Seasonal charter: Antalya, Sharm El Sheikh
Turkish Airlines	Istanbul
Ukraine International Airlines	Kyiv–Boryspil; Seasonal charter: Antalya, Kayseri, Sharm El Sheikh

== Statistics ==
Year	Passengers	Change on previous year
2006	110,810	▲22.8%
2007	118,463	▲6.9%
2008	63,596	▼53.7%
2009	33,960	▼46.6%
2010	33,386	▼1.7%
2011	56,900	▲70.4%
2012	56,788	▼0.2%
2013	79,845	▲40.6%
2014	75,400	▼5.6%
2015	128,104	▲69.9%
2016	275,421	▲115.0%
2017	348,438	▲26.5%
2018	400,326	▲15.0%
2019	434,063	▲8.4%
2020	326,217	▼24.8%

== See also ==
- List of airports in Ukraine
- List of the busiest airports in Ukraine
- List of the busiest airports in Europe
- List of the busiest airports in the former USSR
