= UDJ =

UDJ may refer to:

- Unity for Democracy and Justice, an Ethiopian political party
- Uzhhorod International Airport
- University of Detroit Jesuit High School and Academy, a private high school in Detroit, Michigan, USA
