= Skyline Express =

Ukrainian airline

IATA	ICAO	Call sign
QU	UTN	UT-UKRAINE
- Founded: September 2008; 18 years ago as UTair-Ukraine
- Operating bases: Boryspil International Airport
- Focus cities: Lviv International Airport; Odesa International Airport; Zaporizhzhia International Airport
- Fleet size: 12
- Destinations: 23
- Headquarters: Kyiv, Ukraine
- Website: skylineexpress.aero/ua

Skyline Express Airlines (Ukrainian: Авіакомпанія скайлайн експрес), formerly known as Azur Air Ukraine (2015-2023) and earlier UTair-Ukraine (2008-2015), is a Ukrainian charter airline. The airline was founded in 2008 as a subsidiary of the Russian airline UTair Aviation. In October 2015, the airline was sold to the Turkish based Anex Tourism Group. In 2022, the airline was once again rebranded to its current name.

== History ==
=== UTair-Ukraine (2008–2015) ===
Founded in 2008, UTair-Ukraine was set up as the Ukrainian subsidiary of Russian parent company, UTair Aviation, to serve domestic and international destinations.

=== Azur Air Ukraine (2015–2022) ===
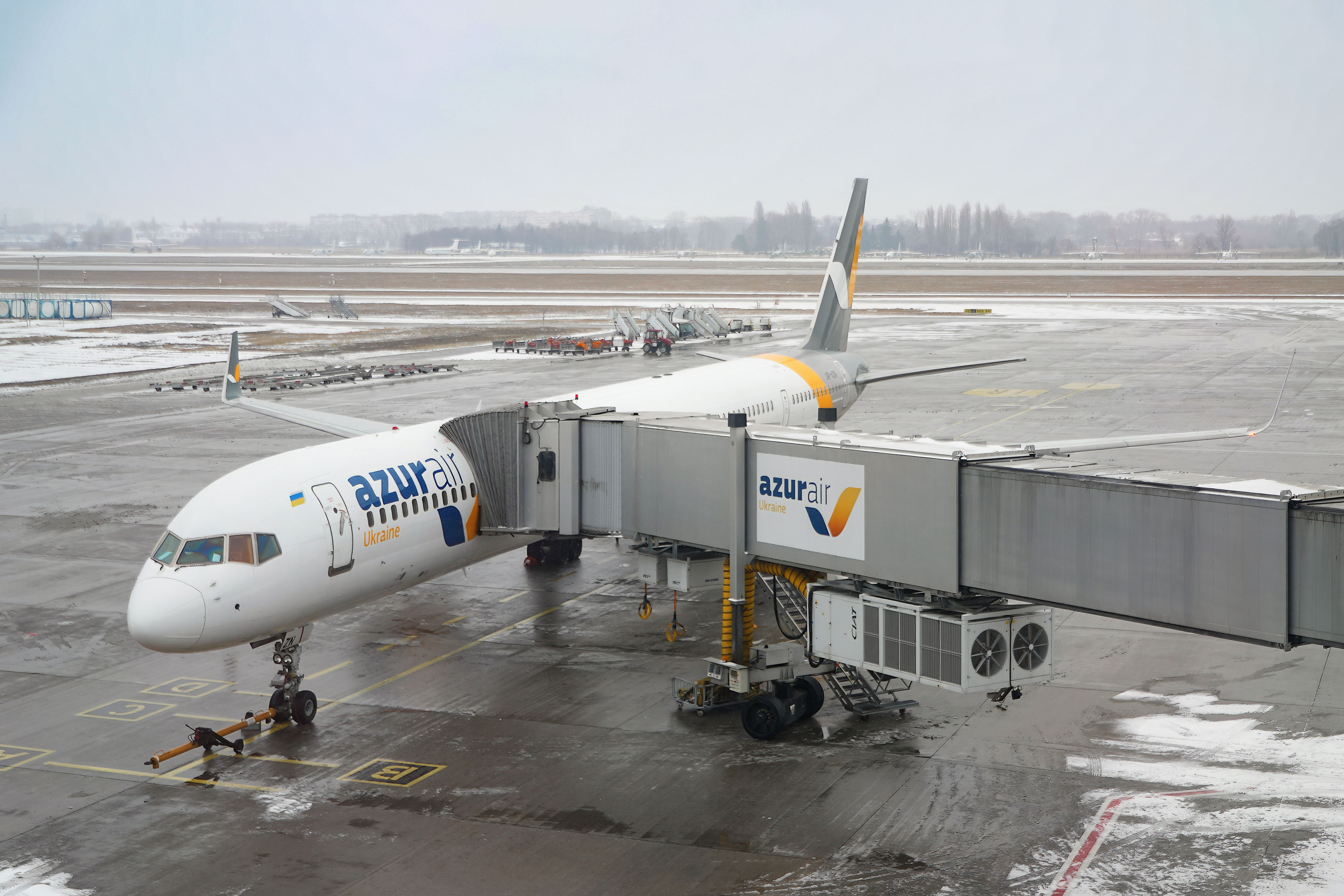
A Boeing 757-300 pictured in 2022 with Azur Air Ukraine branding

UTair-Ukraine already shifted its focus from domestic services to leisure operations earlier and therefore phased out several planes. The sale and rebranding was confirmed shortly after.

=== Skyline Express Airlines (since 2023) ===
In 2023, the airline was once again rebranded to its current name.

== Destinations ==
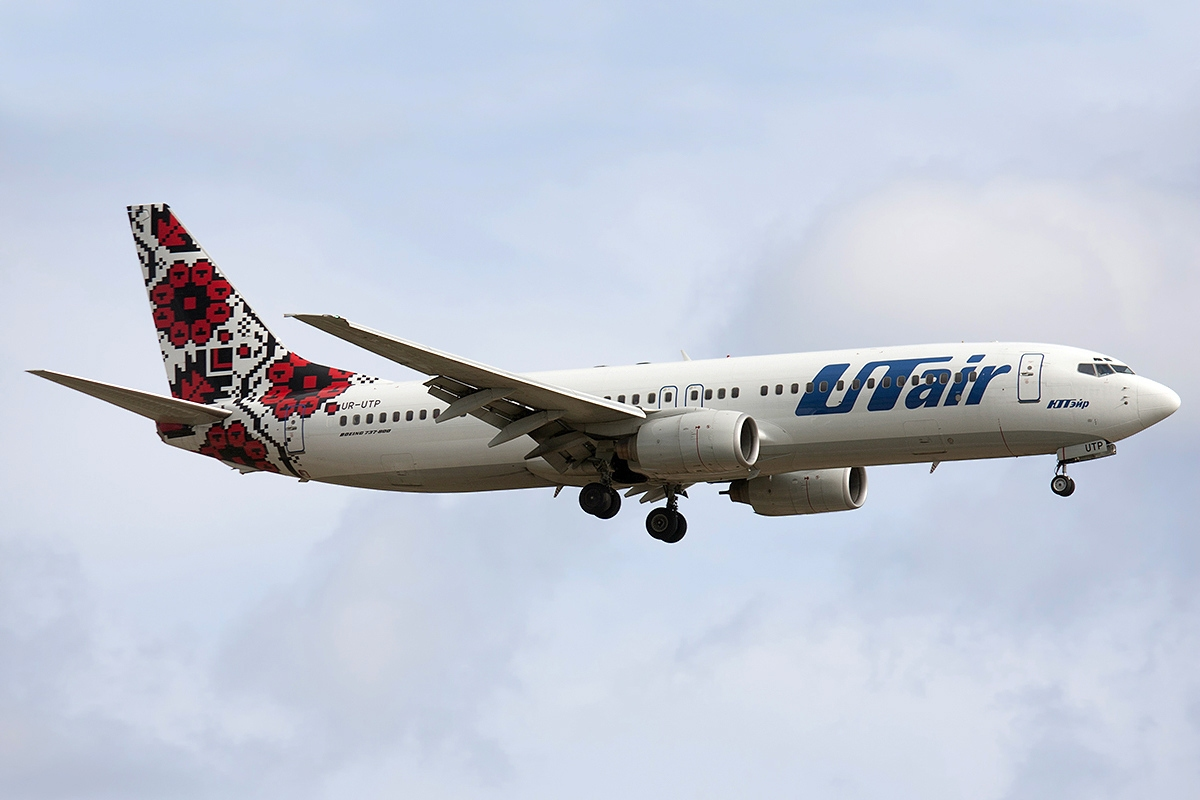
UTair-Ukraine Boeing 737-800

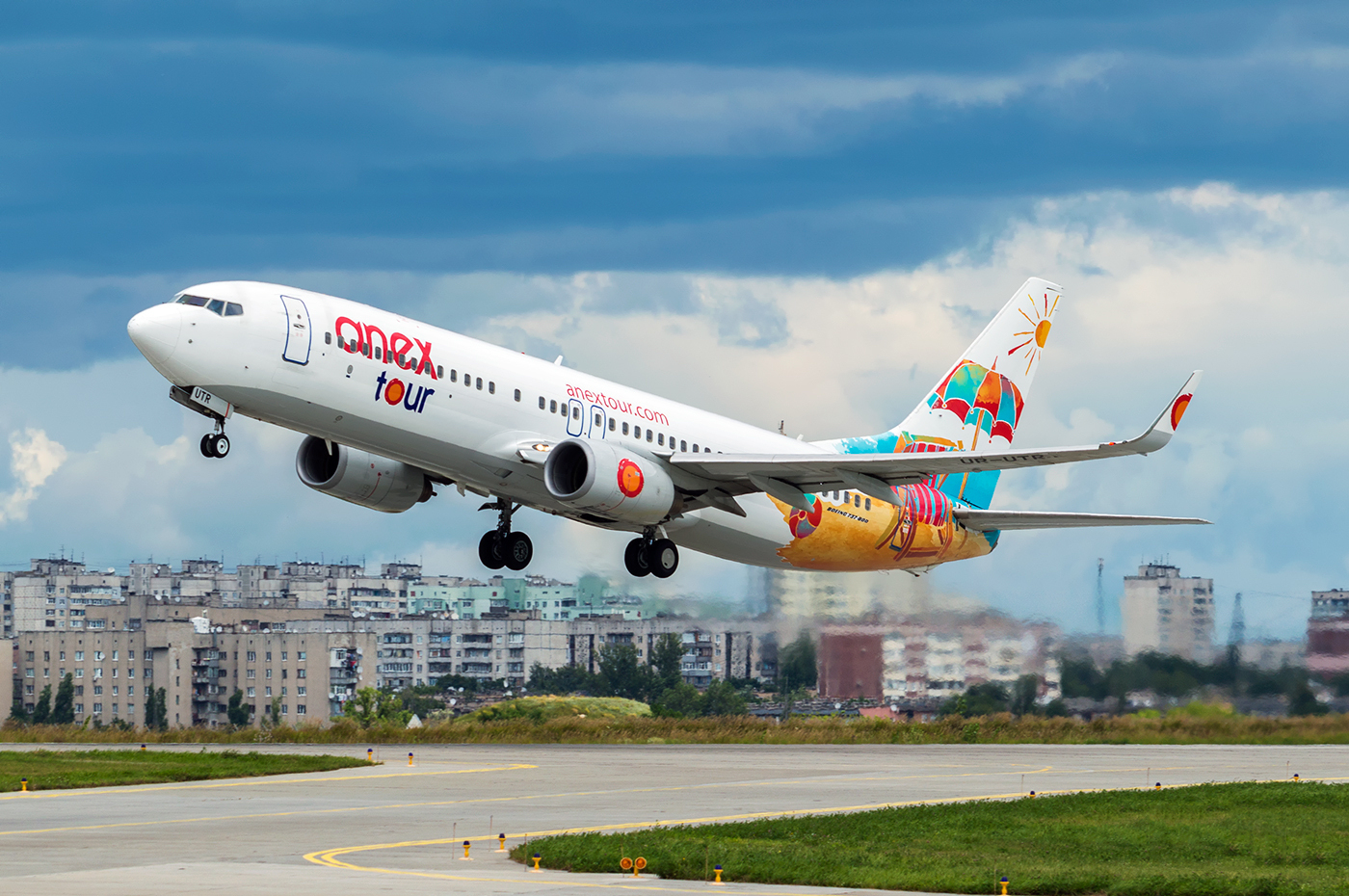
Azur Air Ukraine Boeing 737-800 taking off at Kharkiv International Airport

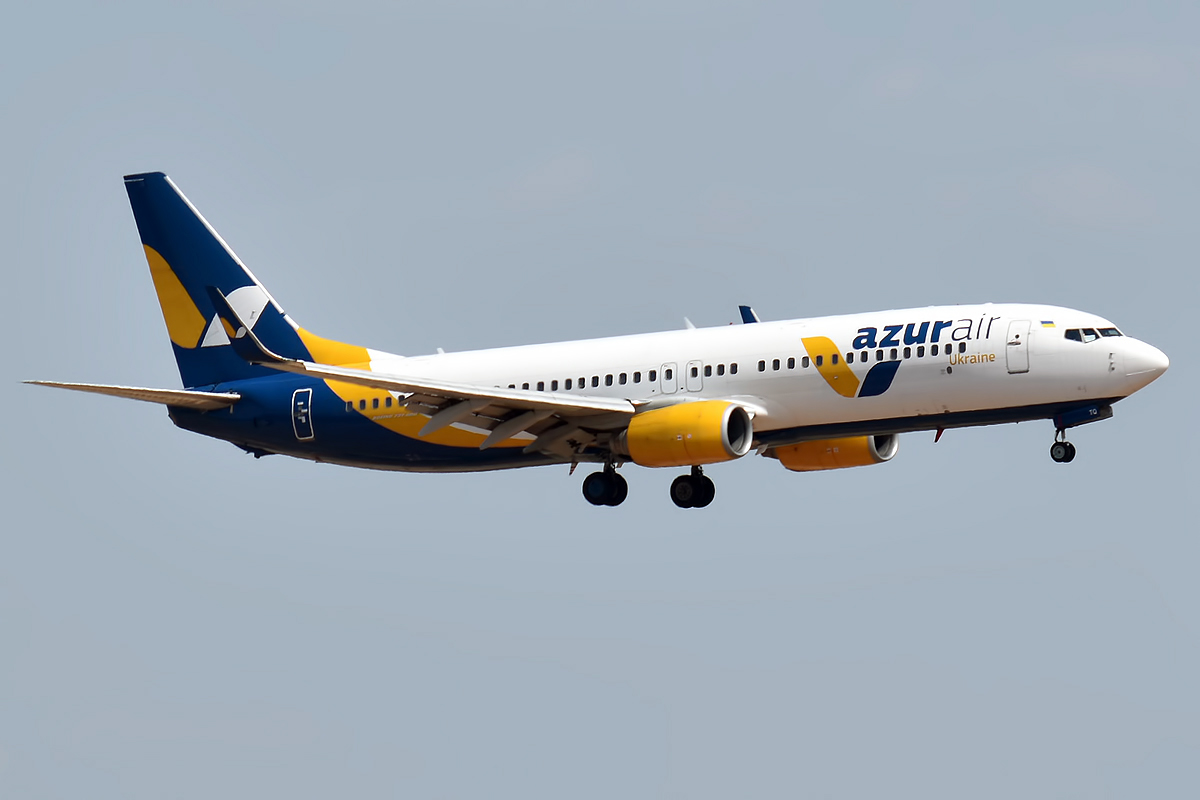
UR-UTQ (737-800) in Azur Air Ukraine livery

As of November 2018, Azur Air Ukraine serves the following charter destinations:

Country	City	Airport	Notes	Refs
Bulgaria	Burgas	Burgas Airport	Seasonal charter	
Dominican Republic	La Romana	La Romana International Airport	Seasonal charter	
Dominican Republic	Punta Cana	Punta Cana International Airport	Seasonal charter	
Egypt	Hurghada	Hurghada International Airport	Charter	
Egypt	Sharm El Sheikh	Sharm El Sheikh International Airport	Charter	
India	Goa	Dabolim Airport	Seasonal charter	
Maldives	Malé	Velana International Airport	Seasonal charter	
Mexico	Cancún	Cancún International Airport	Charter	
Lithuania	Vilnius	Vilnius Čiurlionis International Airport	Charter	
Sri Lanka	Colombo	Bandaranaike International Airport	Seasonal charter	
Thailand	Phuket	Phuket International Airport	Seasonal charter	
Tunisia	Enfidha	Enfidha–Hammamet International Airport	Seasonal charter	
Turkey	Antalya	Antalya Airport	Charter	
Turkey	Bodrum	Milas–Bodrum Airport	Seasonal charter	
Turkey	Dalaman	Dalaman Airport	Seasonal charter	
Ukraine	Kharkiv	Kharkiv International Airport	Charter	
Ukraine	Kyiv	Boryspil International Airport	Base	
Ukraine	Lviv	Lviv Danylo Halytskyi International Airport	Seasonal Base	
Ukraine	Odesa	Odesa International Airport	Seasonal Base	
Ukraine	Zaporizhzhia	Zaporizhzhia International Airport	Seasonal Base	
United Arab Emirates	Dubai	Dubai International Airport	Charter	
Vietnam	Nha Trang	Cam Ranh International Airport	Seasonal charter	

== Fleet ==
As of July 2026, Skyline Express Airlines operates an all-Boeing fleet composed of the following aircraft:

Skyline Express Airlines fleet
Aircraft	In service	Orders	Passengers			Notes
Aircraft	In service	Orders	J	Y	Total	Notes
Boeing 737-800	2	—	—	189	189	
Boeing 737-900ER	1	—	—	215	215	
Boeing 757-300	5	—	—	275	275	(Note: Three aircraft stranded at Boryspil International Airport) (Note: Two aircraft leased from Mavi Gök Airlines)
Boeing 757-300	5	—	—	280	280	(Note: Three aircraft stranded at Boryspil International Airport) (Note: Two aircraft leased from Mavi Gök Airlines)
Boeing 767-300ER	3	—	12	312	324	(Note: All three aircraft stranded at Boryspil International Airport)
Boeing 767-300ER	3	—	—	334	334	(Note: All three aircraft stranded at Boryspil International Airport)
Boeing 777-300ER	1	—	7	524	531	
Total	12	—				
