= Rivne International Airport =

Airport in Rivne, Ukraine

Rivne International Airport Міжнародний аеропорт «Рівне»
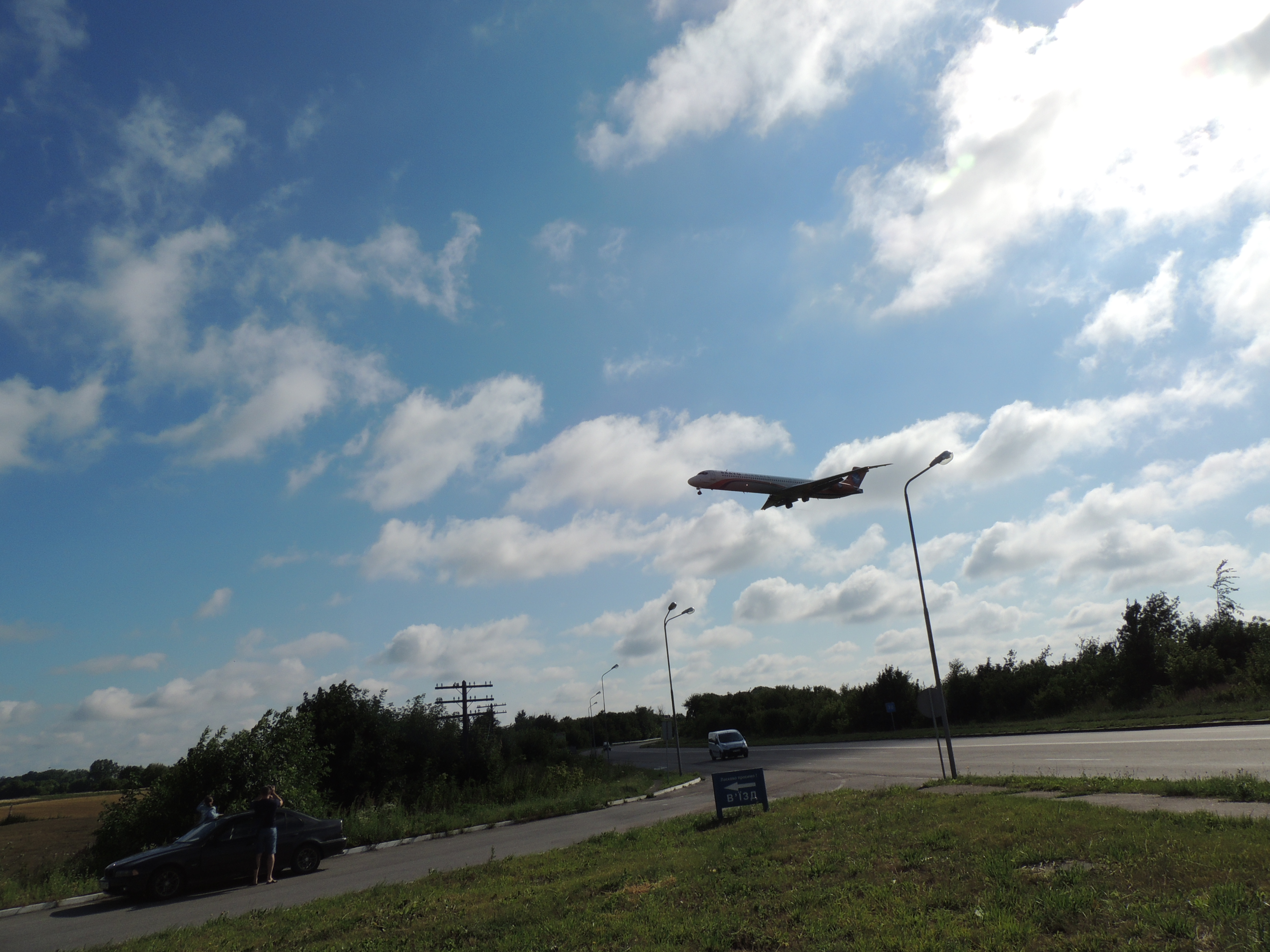
- IATA: RWN; ICAO: UKLR

Summary
- Airport type: Public
- Serves: Rivne
- Location: Rivne, Rivne Oblast, Ukraine
- Elevation AMSL: 755 ft / 230 m
- Coordinates: 50°36′26″N 26°08′30″E

Maps
- Location of Rivne International Airport in Ukraine RWN (Ukraine)
- Interactive map of Rivne International Airport

Runways
Direction	Length		Surface
Direction	ft	m	Surface
12/30	8,615	2,626	Concrete

Statistics (2017)
- Passengers: ▼3,472

Rivne International Airport (Ukrainian: Міжнародний аеропорт «Рівне») (IATA: RWN, ICAO: UKLR) is an airport in Rivne, Ukraine. Recently LOT Polish Airlines was in talks with the consideration of opening a Warsaw route after Bravo Airways ended flights.

== Airlines and destinations ==
As of January 2026, there are no regular scheduled services at the airport due to the ongoing closure of the Ukrainian airspace.

== Statistics ==
Year	Total passengers	Change from previous year
2015	394	-
2016	6,997	▲1675.9%
2017	3,472	▼50.4%

== See also ==
- List of airports in Ukraine
- List of the busiest airports in Ukraine
- List of the busiest airports in Europe
- List of the busiest airports in the former USSR
