= Odesa International Airport =

Ukrainian airport

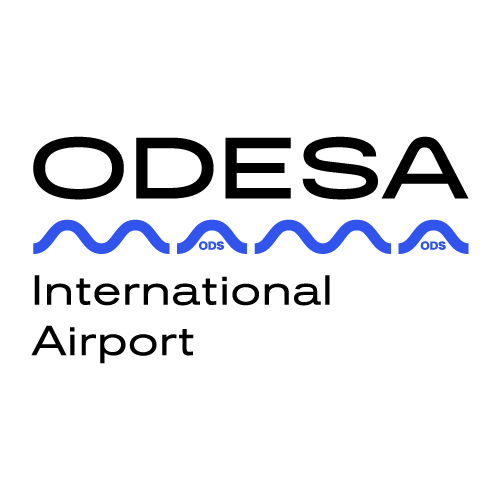

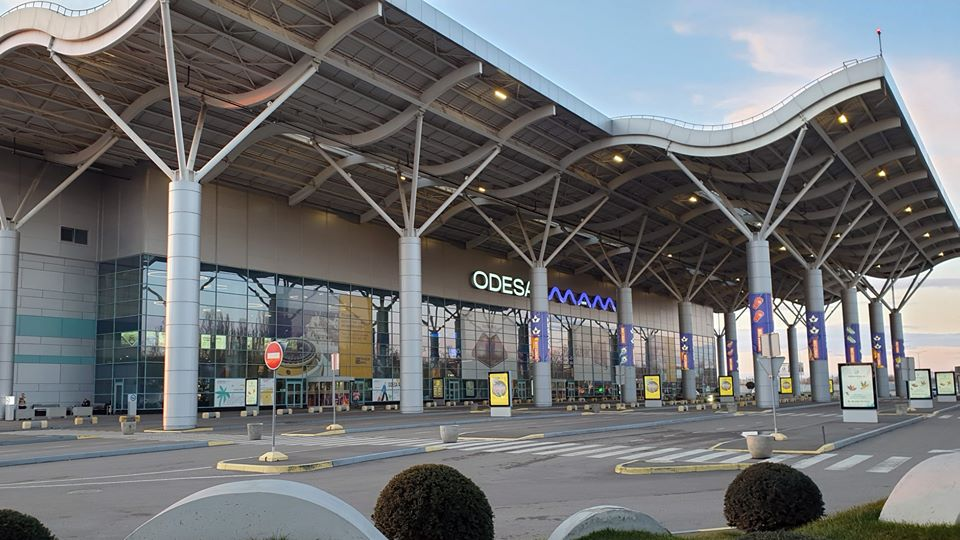
- IATA: ODS; ICAO: UKOO

Summary
- Airport type: Military/public
- Serves: Odesa
- Location: Odesa, Ukraine
- Focus city for: Ukraine International Airlines
- Elevation AMSL: 172 ft / 52 m
- Coordinates: 46°25′37″N 30°40′41″E
- Website: www.odesa.aero

Maps
- Location in Ukraine ODS (Ukraine)
- Interactive map of Odesa International Airport

Runways
Direction	Length		Surface
Direction	m	ft	Surface
07/25	553	1,814	Grass
16/34	2,800	9,186	Asphalt concrete

Statistics (2021)
- Passengers: 1,328,326 ▲90%

Odesa International Airport (Ukrainian: Міжнародний аеропорт «Одеса», romanized: Mizhnarodnyi aeroport "Odesa") (IATA: ODS, ICAO: UKOO) is an international airport of Odesa, the third largest city of Ukraine, located 7 km (4.3 mi) southwest from its city centre.

On 24 February 2022, Ukraine closed airspace to civilian flights due to the Russian invasion of Ukraine.

== Facilities ==
The area of Odesa International airport is 570 hectares. Technical service of airport is based on 2,800 square meters area and represented by four parking places to provide technical service to four planes simultaneously. European standards classify the airport as "class 1". The airport has ILS CAT I status.

The airport's runways either were or are co-used by the Ukrainian Air Force.

== History ==
The airport was built in 1961.

In May 2007, the airport started construction work that included extending the main runway.

In 2009, it served 651,000 passengers.

On 8 June 2012, builders started to prepare the land on which the new terminal would be built. The area of the new terminal was to be 26,000 square meters, with the capacity for 1,000 passengers per hour (1.5–2 million passengers per year). It would have 16 check-in desks, and four telescopic gangways, and the number of bus pick-up points would be increased from two to five. The construction of the new terminal was planned to be completed by the end of 2013. However, due to extensive delays, it was opened for arrivals on 15 April 2017. It is to serve both international and domestic flights. The estimated cost of the work was around 45–60 million. Airport Consulting Vienna company has developed a master plan, business plan and evaluation of the technical concept of the airport. The chief designer of the project is the Spanish company Ineco.

In 2019, Odesa International Airport announced an international competition for the best idea of a sculpture-symbol of the city's air gates. The first place was taken by Ukrainian artist Stepan Ryabchenko. His sculpture "Sphere" will be made and installed near the new airport terminal.

During expansion work in 2021, workers found a mass grave containing 5,000-8,000 skeletons believed to be victims of the Holodomor.

=== 2022 Russo-Ukrainian War ===
On 30 April 2022 a Russian missile struck the newly constructed runway, destroying it. Ukrainian officials stated that a Bastion missile was used, and no one was hurt. The Russian military later confirmed the attack.

== Airlines and destinations ==
As of 24 February 2022, all passenger flights have been suspended indefinitely.

Airlines	Destinations
Air Baltic	Seasonal: Riga
AJet	Istanbul–Sabiha Gökçen
Austrian Airlines	Vienna
Azerbaijan Airlines	Baku
Flydubai	Dubai–International
LOT Polish Airlines	Warsaw–Chopin; Seasonal: Rzeszow
Motor Sich Airlines	Kyiv–Zhuliany
Pegasus Airlines	Ankara, Istanbul–Sabiha Gökçen
Skyline Express	Seasonal charter: Antalya, Sharm El Sheikh
SkyUp	Prague, Tbilisi, Yerevan; Seasonal: Baku, Barcelona, Batumi, Rimini, Tel Aviv, Tirana, Tivat, Vilnius; Seasonal charter: Antalya, Sharm El Sheikh
Turkish Airlines	Istanbul
Ukraine International Airlines	Istanbul, Kyiv–Boryspil, Tel Aviv; Seasonal: Ivano-Frankivsk; Seasonal charter: Antalya, Kayseri

== Statistics ==
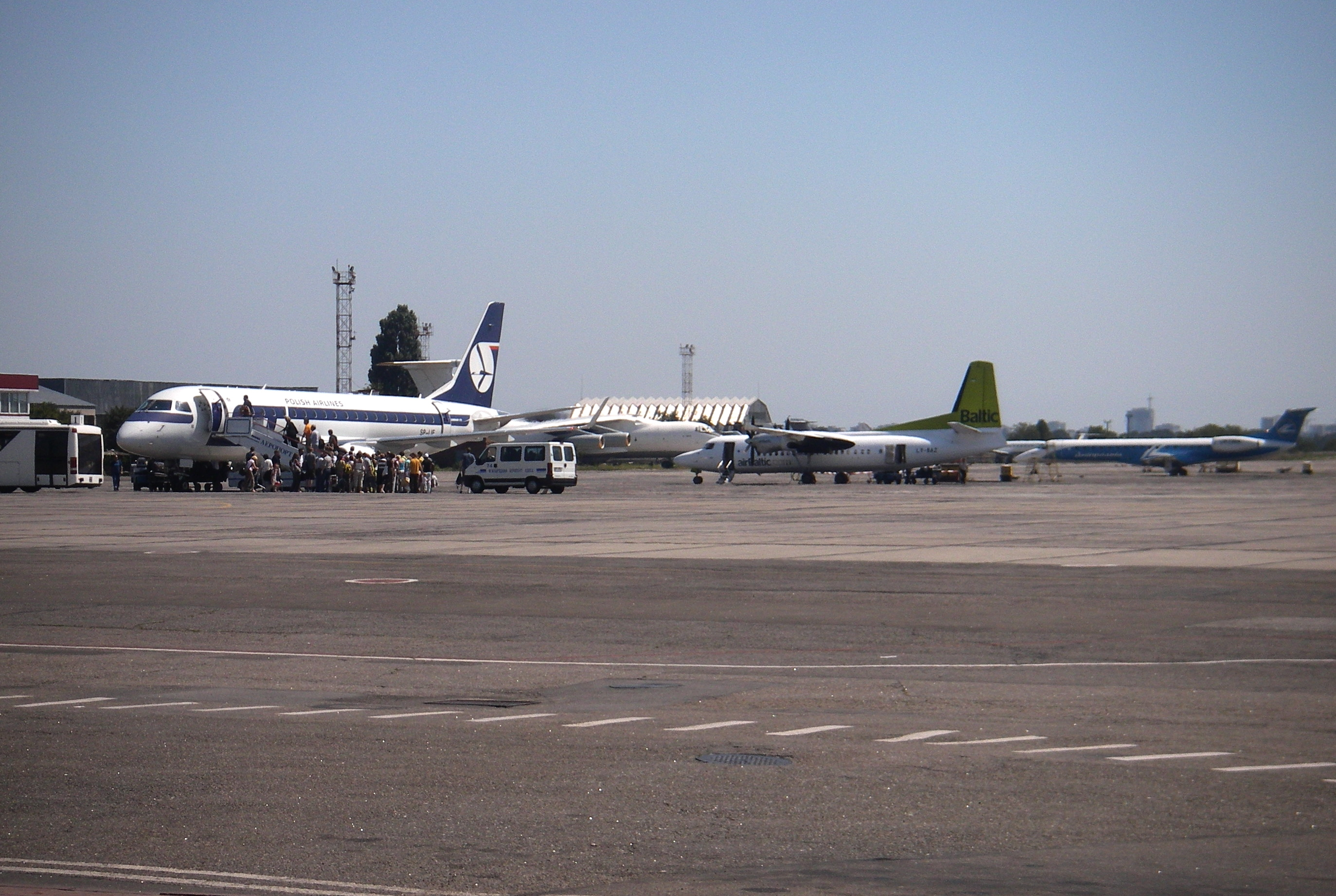
Apron overview

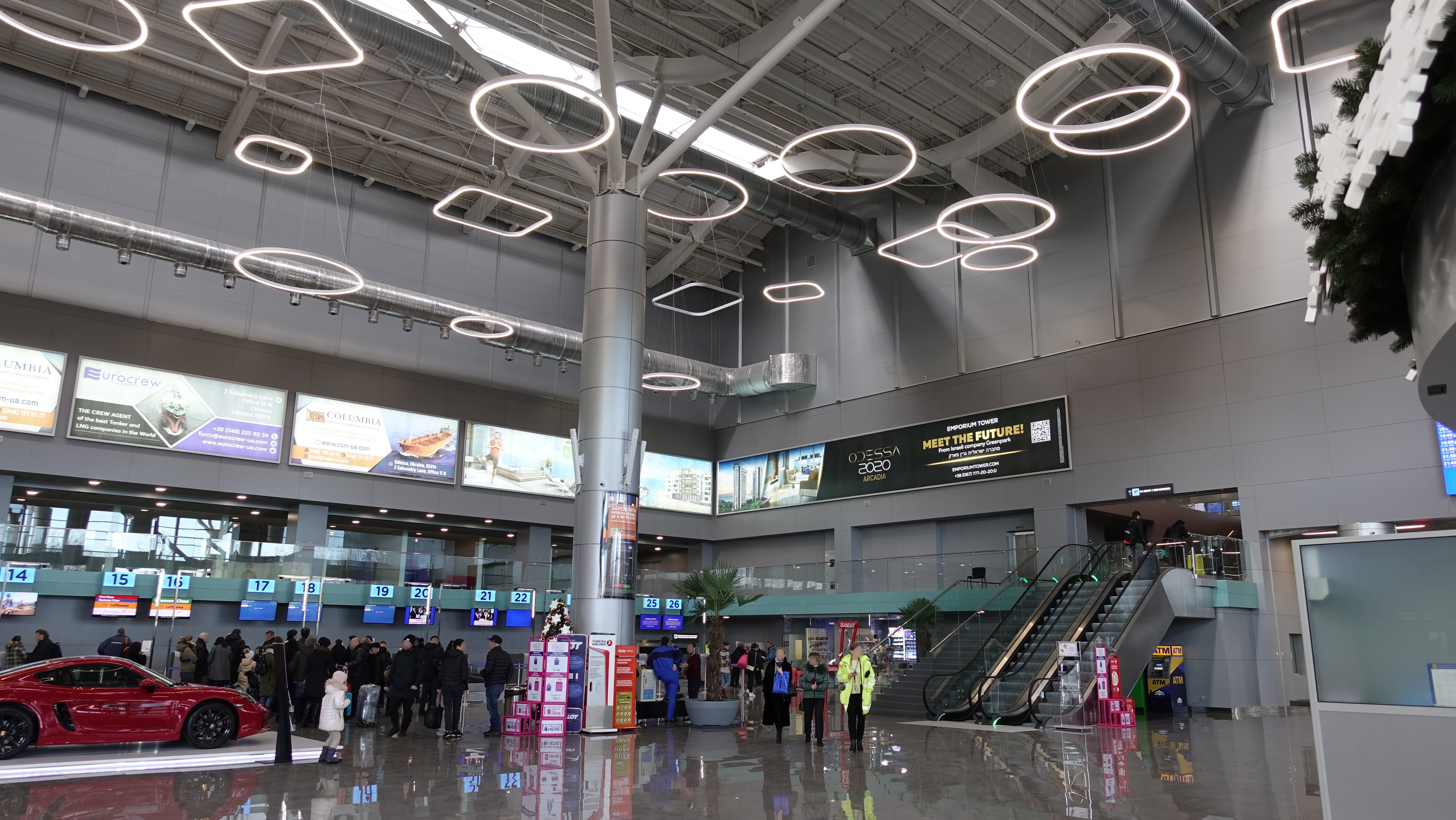
Check-in hall interior

Main entrance

Year	Passengers	Change on previous year
2001	117,000	
2002	132,000	▲12.8%
2003	260,000	▲97.0%
2004	307,000	▲18.1%
2005	343,000	▲11.7%
2006	465,100	▲35.6%
2007	527,400	▲13.4%
2008	787,000	▲49.2%
2009	651,000	▼17.3%
2010	707,100	▲8.6%
2011	824,300	▲17.0%
2012	907,600	▲10.1%
2013	1,069,100	▲17.8%
2014	863,900	▼19.2%
2015	949,100	▲9.8%
2016	1,033,560	▲8.9%
2017	1,230,000	▲18.3%
2018	1,446,500	▲17.7%
2019	1,694,022	▲17.1%

== See also ==
- List of airports in Ukraine
- List of the busiest airports in Ukraine
- List of the busiest airports in Europe
- List of the busiest airports in the former USSR
- Borys Kaufman
