= Mykolaiv Airport =

International Airport Mykolaiv
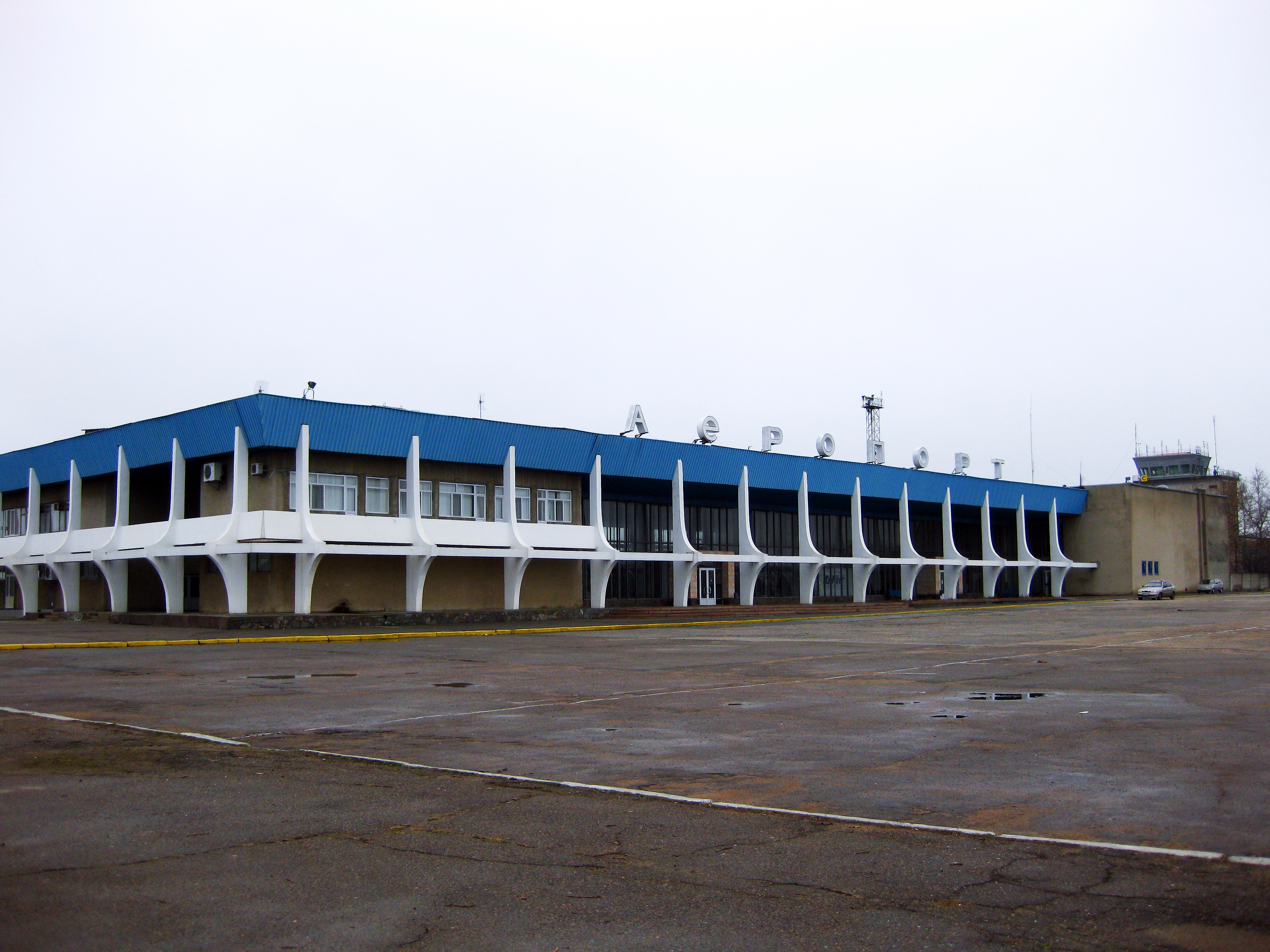
- IATA: NLV; ICAO: UKON

Summary
- Airport type: Public
- Serves: Mykolaiv, Mykolaiv Oblast, Ukraine
- Closed: February 2022
- Elevation AMSL: 56 m / 184 ft
- Coordinates: 47°03′29″N 031°55′15″E
- Website: www.nlv.aero

Maps
- Location of the airport in Ukraine NLV (Ukraine)
- Interactive map of International Airport Mykolaiv

Runways
Direction	Length		Surface
Direction	m	ft	Surface
05R/23L	2,572	8,438	Asphalt
05L/23R	1,800	5,906	Grass

Statistics (2019)
- Passengers: ▲22,700
- Sources: WAD, GCM, ASN STV; Statistics: State Aviation Service of Ukraine; Source: Avianews.com

Mykolaiv International Airport, also known as Nikolaev Airport (Ukrainian: Міжнародний аеропорт Миколаїв, Russian: Международный аэропорт Николаев) (IATA: NLV, ICAO: UKON) is an airport in Mykolaiv, southern Ukraine. The Class B airport has a modern runway ready to receive aircraft with landing weight up to 220 tonnes (220 long tons; 240 short tons) and to hold eight Il-76 aircraft equipped with lighting, radio and navigation equipment. The airport is also increased to receive the Airbus A310.

== History ==
In 1960, Mykolaiv Airport was made into a passenger airport. With of the flow of passengers, in 1975, the boarding terminal was built.

In order to have the possibility of receiving and serving airplanes like the Тu (Tupolev)-154, Il(Ilushin)-76, Аn(Antonov)-22, and Il-62, in 1989, the boarding gate at the airport was upgraded.

In 1992, Mykolaiv Airport passed its international certification, through which it was able to accept and handle aircraft from other countries. In 1993, a new passenger terminal was built. In that year the airport received its certificate for the third category of International organization of passenger aviation (IKAO) as an airport for internal flights in the USSR with the right to accept Ty-134 airplanes and airplanes of similar classes.

In April 2007, Mykolaiv Oblast (regional) Council decided to joint-stockicize the airport, with the goal of subsequent privatization. In March 2008, the Oblast Council created a commission for privatization of the enterprise, Mykolaiv International Airport.

In January 2009, the Mykolaiv Oblast State Administration reorganized the cooperative enterprise Mykolaiv International Airport into an open stock society. In October 2010, the Mykolaiv Oblast Council canceled its decision to privatize the cooperative enterprise, Mykolaiv International Airport and to reorganize the airport into a public stock society. As was communicated in the session of the County Council, of Mykolaiv County State Administration Igor Katvaluk said: "Until today, not one serious buyer or interested party came to us to invest in our airport. The furthest finding of the airport in procedure of privatization is held its development as a cooperative enterprise".

In June 2011, the Mayor of the Oblast Council, Igor Dyatlov asked what support the idea of privatization on the condition of the before term presented airport development plan.

The air terminal complex before 2013 had a throughput capacity up to 400 passengers per hour on internal airline flights and up to 100 passengers per hour on international flights. Since late 2014, the throughput capacity is 300 persons per hour.

Then the airport felt into disarray so that by September 2014, buildings, facilities and customs and border checkpoint had to be prepared to resume operations after the Mykolaiv Oblast State Administration had decided one month earlier to re-open the airport.

In early 2018, Ukraine International Airlines intended to open flights to Mykolaiv in 2019 but still there are no flights yet from the carrier.

On 24 February 2022, Ukraine closed airspace to civilian flights due to Russian invasion of Ukraine. Mykolaiv airport was completely destroyed during the Russian invasion in the spring of 2022.

The Russian military bombarded the airport with missiles in the evening of 27 February 2022.

== Airlines and destinations ==
The following airlines operate regular scheduled and charter services at the airport.

All passenger flights were suspended indefinitely on 24 February 2022.

Airlines	Destinations
Motor Sich Airlines	Kyiv–Zhuliany
SkyUp	Seasonal charter: Antalya, Sharm El Sheikh
Windrose Airlines	Seasonal: Kyiv–Boryspil

== See also ==
- List of airports in Ukraine
- List of the busiest airports in Ukraine
- List of the busiest airports in Europe
- List of the busiest airports in the former USSR
