= Chernivtsi Border Detachment =

31st Chernivtsi Border Detachment
- 31 прикордонний загін імені генерал-хорунжого Олександра Пилькевича (Ukrainian)
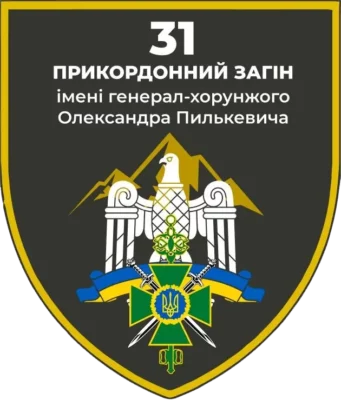
- Detachment Insignia
- Founded: 1992
- Country: Ukraine
- Allegiance: Ministry of Internal Affairs
- Branch: State Border Guard Service of Ukraine
- Type: Brigade
- Role: Border Guard
- Part of: State Border Guard Service of Ukraine
- Garrison/HQ: Chernivtsi
- Patron: Major-General Oleksandr Pylkevich
- Engagements: Russo-Ukrainian war: War in Donbass; Russian invasion of Ukraine

Commanders
- Current commander: Colonel Yevheny Babych

Insignia
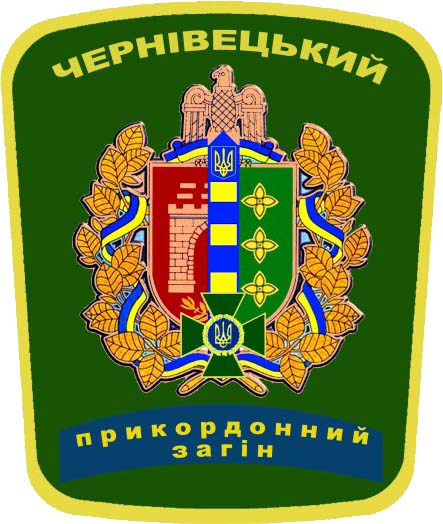
- Former Insignia

The Chernivtsi Border Detachment "Major-General Oleksandr Pylkevich" (MUN 2195) is a brigade level detachment of the Western Regional Department of the State Border Service of Ukraine. The detachment guards the Ukraine-Moldova border and the Ukraine-Romania border in three Raions (Vyzhnytsia Raion, Chernivtsi Raion and Dniester Raion) of Chernivtsi Oblast, one Raion (Verkhovyna Raion) of the Ivano-Frankivsk Oblast as well as guarding the Ivano-Frankivsk Airport and Chernivtsi International Airport. The total border guarded by the detachment is 404.7km of which Ukrainian-Romanian section is 234.7km and the Ukrainian-Moldovan section is 170km.

== History ==
It was established in 1992 to Ukraine-Romania border and Ukraine-Moldova border in Chernivtsi Oblast. Since 2008, the border detachment has been staffed exclusively by contract servicemen. On 12 August 2014, the Chernivtsi border detachment celebrated its 70th anniversary. On 22 June 2016, for the first time in 8 years, more than a hundred conscripts joined the detachment. On 22 August 2018, the Chernivtsi border detachment was awarded the honorary name of "Colonel-General Oleksandr Pylkevich", commander of the Ukrainian People's Republic's Border Corps. In March 2021, it prevented a smuggling attempt of 6,400 cigarettes into Romania. In May 2021, the detachment again foiled the smuggling attempt of 4,400 more cigarettes.

In January 2023, a guardsman of the detachment (Khomandyak Roman) was killed while fighting on the frontlines. In May 2023, the Chernivtsi Detachment along with Dozor detachment detained three people trying to illegally cross the border along with their smuggler and two vehicles used by them were seized. In early August 2023, 41 persons attempting illegal border crossing attempts were detained by the detachment. On 14 October 2023, a guardsman of the detachment (Oleksandr Reshetnyk) was killed in action against Russian forces. In November 2023, a guardsman of the detachment (Grubo Roman) was killed while fighting in the frontlines. On 4 December 2023, the detachment with assistance from other units captured a trafficking vehicle and detained the traffickers after a short chase near the border. In early 2024, two checkpoints of the detachment were blocked by Romanian farmers. On 10 January 2024, the detachment detained eight people illegally trying to cross the border into Romania and Moldova. In March 2024, a foreign vehicle smuggling 400 cigarettes was seized by the detachment. On 29 June 2024, two people armed with machetes and a gas canister attacked the detachment's personnel who responded by firing back killing one of the attackers and wounding the second.

== Structure ==
The Chernivtsi border detachment is composed of:

- Management and Headquarters
- Border Service Department "Porubne"
- Border Service Department "Shibene"
- Border Service Department "Sokyryani"
- Border Service Department "Krasnoilsk"
- Border Service Department "Falkiv"
- Border Service Department "Cherepkivka"
- Border Service Department "Kelmentsi"
- Border Service Department "Hertsa"
- Border Service Department "Selyatyn"
- Border Service Department "Vashkivtsi"
- Border Service Department "Mamalyga"
- Border Service Department "Ivano-Frankivsk Airport"
- Border Service Inspection Division "Perkalab"
- Border Service Inspection Division "Shepit"
- Border Service Inspection Division "Selyatyn"
- Border Service Inspection Division "Falkiv"
- Border Service Inspection Division "Krasnoilsk", "Nizhny Petrivtsi"
- Border Service Inspection Division "Bila Krynytsia", "Cherepkivka"
- Border Service Inspection Division "Porubne"
- Border Service Inspection Division "Kulikivka"
- Border Service Inspection Division "Mamalyga"
- Border Service Inspection Division "Hertsa"
- Border Service Inspection Division "Tarasivtsi"
- Border Service Inspection Division "Podvirne"
- Border Service Inspection Division "Kelmentsi"
- Border Service Inspection Division "Podvryivka"
- Border Service Inspection Division "Sokyryani"
- Border Service Inspection Division "Vashkivtsi"
- Border Service Inspection Division "Hvozdivtsi"
- Border Service Inspection Division "Chernivtsi"
- Border Service Inspection Division "Ivano-Frankivsk"
- Mobile Border Outpost "Chernivtsi"
- Guardian units

It controls operations of 21 checkpoints including 12 international checkpoints:

- Automotive: 12
- Railway:4
- Air travel: 3
- Pedestrian: 2

== Commanders ==
- Colonel Petro Ivanovich Lutskyi (-1992)
- Major General Bidakh Volodymyr Prokopovich (1992-1998)
- Colonel Mykola Mykolayovych Gursky (1998-2000)
- Colonel Vasyl Vasylovich Chubyuk (2000-2004)
- Colonel Serhii Hryhorovych Stukalo (2004-2008)
- Colonel Mykola Oleksiiovych Matsyshin (2008-2009)
- Colonel Zhovtonozhuk Ihor Petrovych (2009-2011)
- Colonel Oleksandr Ivanovich Kruk (February-September 2011)
- Colonel Andrii Andriyovych Bura (2011-2013)
- Colonel Mykhailo Borisovych Kotov (2013-2014)
- Colonel Viktor Ivanovich Yavtushenko (2014-2015)
- Colonel Ihor Mykolayovych Mosiichuk (February-July 2015)
- Colonel Volodymyr Ivanovich Vorobets (July-November 2015)
- Colonel Pavlo Petrovych Lysak (2015-2017)
- Colonel Vovk Oleg Omelyanovych (2017-2019)
- Colonel Martsinkevich Serhiy Vasyliovych (2019-2021)
- Colonel Romanchuk M.S. (2021-?)
- Colonel Yevgeny Babych (?-)

== Sources ==
- Чернівецький прикордонний загін Державної прикордонної служби України
- Кордон з Румунією тепер охороняється за новою моделлю
