= Anda Air =

Ukrainian airline

IATA	ICAO	Call sign
DM	SSV	ANDA AIR
- Founded: 2015
- Hubs: Kyiv International Airport (Zhuliany)
- Fleet size: 1
- Headquarters: Kyiv, Ukraine
- Key people: Serhiy Shamenko; Georgii Avanesov

Anda Air (Ukrainian: Анда Ейр), is an airline based in Kyiv, Ukraine. It operates charter services to Egypt, Jordan, and Turkey.

== History ==
The airline was established in 2015 and began operations in October 2016.

== Destinations ==
Anda Air operates the following services (as of January 2017):

Albania

- Tirana - Tirana International Airport

Egypt

- Marsa Alam - Marsa Alam International Airport

Georgia

- Batumi - Batumi International Airport
- Tbilisi - Tbilisi International Airport

Jordan

- Aqaba - King Hussein International Airport

Turkey

- Antalya - Antalya Airport

Ukraine

- Chernivtsi - Chernivtsi International Airport
- Kyiv - Kyiv International Airport (Zhuliany) Base
- Kryvyi Rih - Kryvyi Rih Airport

== Fleet ==
As of August 2025, Anda Air operates the following aircraft:

Anda Air fleet
Aircraft	In Fleet	Orders	Passengers
Airbus A320-200	1	—	180
Total	1	—	
