= Motor Sich Airlines =

Ukrainian airline

Motor Sich Airlines Авіакомпанія Мотор Січ
IATA	ICAO	Call sign
M9	MSI	MOTOR SICH
- Founded: 1984
- Hubs: Zaporizhzhia International Airport
- Fleet size: 2
- Destinations: 8
- Parent company: Motor Sich
- Headquarters: Zaporizhzhia, Ukraine

Motor Sich is a Ukrainian airline based in Zaporizhzhia, Ukraine. It operates passenger and cargo services, including charter and scheduled flights. Its main base is Zaporizhzhia International Airport.

== History ==
The airline was established in 1984 and is wholly owned by the Motor Sich Joint Stock Company, an aircraft-engine company. At the peaks of its operations, the airline maintained offices in Kyiv, Moscow, Istanbul, Ankara, Sharjah, and Delhi, and operated a fleet of 10 aircraft and 7 helicopters. Previously, the airline was included on the list of banned airlines in European Union airspace due to safety issues. In November 2009, this was lifted following an inspection by the European Aviation Safety Agency that confirmed improvements had been made.

In March 2019, the airline launched a new domestic route between Kyiv and Uzhhorod with a connection in Lviv, with the inaugural flight on 15 March 2019 being opened by then Ukrainian President Petro Poroshenko and Infrastructure Minister Volodymyr Omelyan. The route was notable because at the time, the destination, Uzhhorod Airport, had operated no regular flights since June 2016 and had only received European Aviation Safety Agency confirmation in December 2018. Despite this, the route was cancelled in May 2019, after less than two months, because of its unprofitability. Later that same year, the airline also cancelled most of its routes from Kyiv, including to Odesa and a lot of its Lviv routes, and instead would focus more on its route from Zaporizhzhia to Kyiv, which they were operating twice daily, and to Minsk, which was operating four times per week. Motor Sich also indicated at the time that the Kyiv-Uzhhorod route might be resumed in spring 2020, although this never happened because of the COVID-19 pandemic.

In June 2021, the airline resumed flights between Kyiv and Lviv using the Antonov An-24. They also launched a new domestic route between Kyiv and Mykolaiv in January 2022 that would have four flights per week. It was the first Ukrainian airline to operate the route. On 24 February 2022, Ukraine closed its airspace to civilian flights due to the Russian invasion. The airline has suspended all passenger flights until further notice, although it continues to operate cargo flights. On 23 October 2022, the Ukrainian Security Service (SBU) detained the honorary president of Motor Sich and the airline, Vyacheslav Bohuslayev, on suspicion of treason by cooperating with Russia. The allegation was that he supplied batches of Ukrainian aircraft engines to Russia, which were used in Russian military helicopters against Ukraine.

== Destinations ==
Belarus

- Minsk - Minsk National Airport (suspended following the diverting of Ryanair Flight 4978)

Ukraine

- Kyiv - Kyiv Zhuliany International Airport
- Lviv - Lviv Danylo Halytskyi International Airport
- Mykolaiv - Mykolaiv Airport
- Odesa - Odesa International Airport
- Zaporizhzhia - Zaporizhzhia International Airport

Saudi Arabia

- Riyadh - King Khalid International Airport

=== Codeshare agreements ===
Motor Sich Airlines has had a codeshare agreement with Belavia.

== Fleet ==
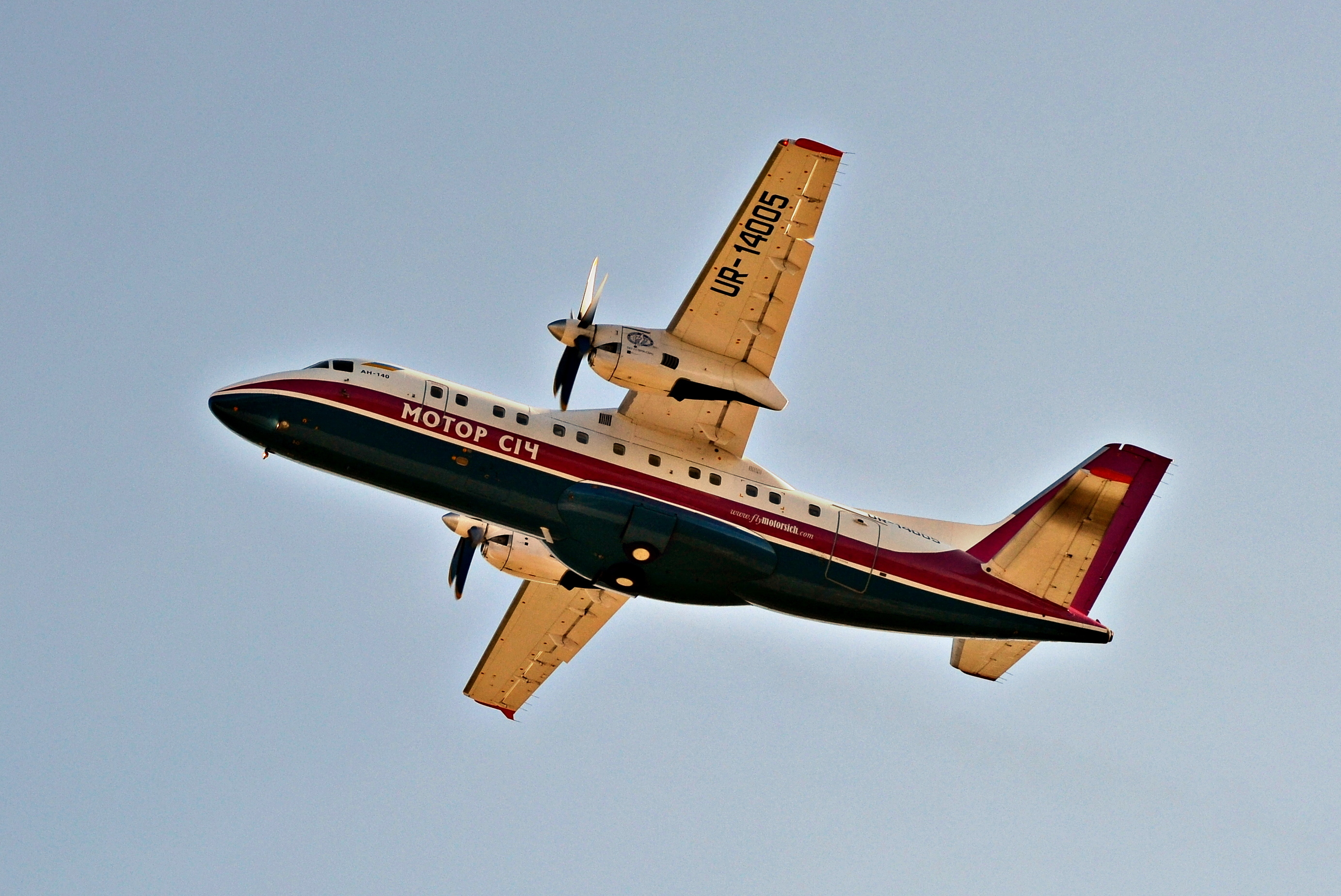
Motor Sich Airlines Antonov An-140

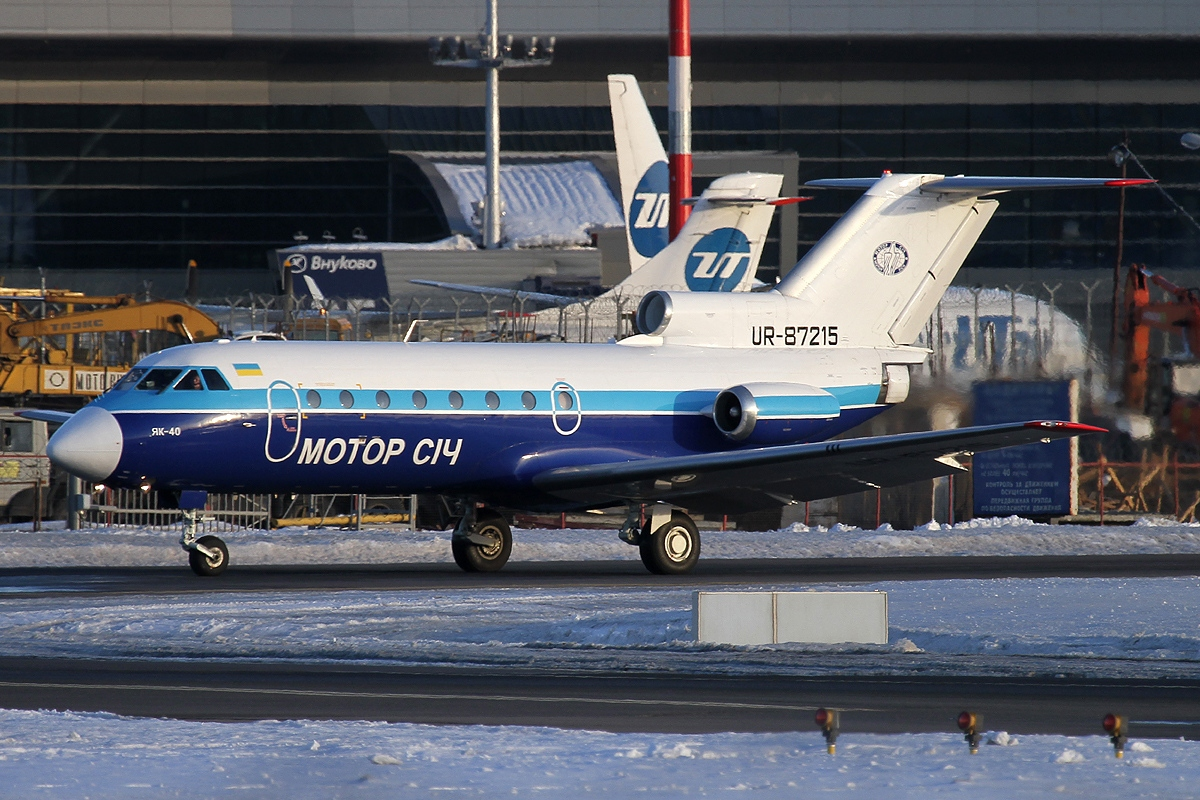
Motor Sich Airlines Yakovlev Yak-40

=== Current fleet ===
As of August 2025, Motor Sich Airlines operates the following aircraft:

Motor Sich Airlines fleet
Aircraft	In fleet	Orders	Notes
Antonov An-12	2	—	
Total	2		

=== Former fleet ===
As of November 2017, the Motor Sich fleet included the following aircraft

Former Motor Sich Airlines fleet
Aircraft	In fleet	Orders	Notes
Antonov An-12	2	—	
Antonov An-24RV	3	—	
Antonov An-74	1	—	Convertible between freight and passenger
Antonov An-140	1	2	Currently painted in 'Motor Handball' livery (2019)
Yakovlev Yak-40	3	—	UR-VBV in VIP configuration
Mil Mi-8	3	—	
Total	13	2	

The airline has also previously operated

- 5 Antonov An-26 registration (UR-26199 / UR-26016 / UR-26113 / UR-26598 / UR-BXF )
- 1 Antonov An-12 registration UR-48975

== Accidents ==
On 2 July 2022, an Antonov An-12 (registration number UR-11316) transporting military cargo from Istanbul, Turkey skidded the runway while landing in Uzhhorod Airport. The aircraft suffered light damage.
