= Havryshivka Vinnytsia International Airport =

International airport in Ukraine

Havryshivka Vinnytsia International Airport Міжнародний Аеропорт «Вінниця» (Гавришівка)

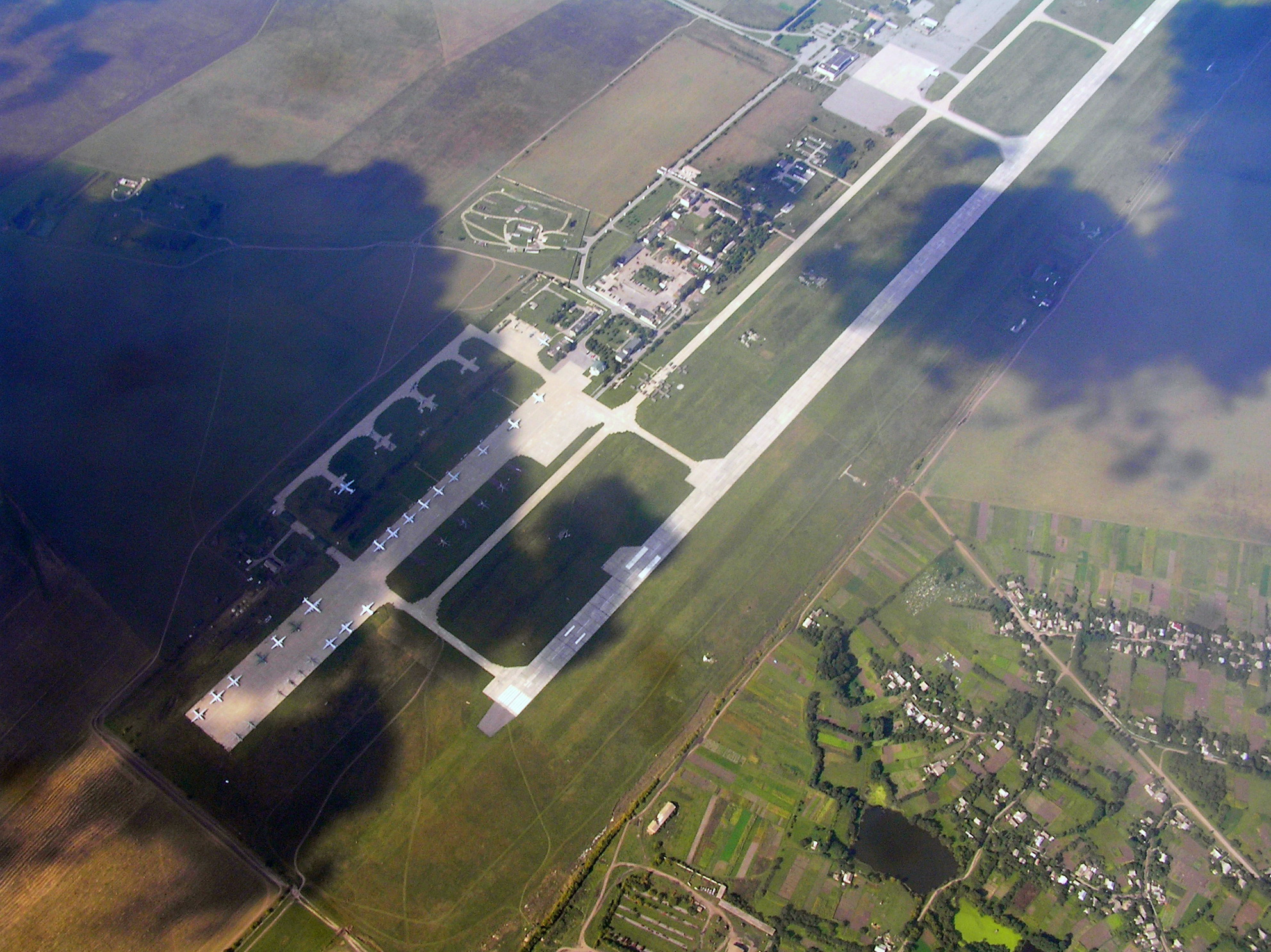
- IATA: VIN; ICAO: UKWW

Summary
- Airport type: Defunct
- Serves: Vinnytsia, Ukraine
- Location: Vinnytsia Oblast
- Elevation AMSL: 297 m / 974 ft
- Coordinates: 49°14′23″N 028°36′50″E
- Website: airvinnytsia.com

Maps
- Location of the airport in Ukraine
- Interactive map of Havryshivka Vinnytsia International Airport

Runways
Direction	Length		Surface
Direction	m	ft	Surface
13/31	2,500	8,202	Concrete

Statistics (2018)
- Passengers: ▲60,873

Vinnytsia International Airport (Ukrainian: Міжнародний Аеропорт «Вінниця» (Гавришівка)) (IATA: VIN, ICAO: UKWW) is an airport located near the village of Havryshivka, serving the city of Vinnytsia in the Vinnytsia region of Ukraine.

The airport was home to the 456th Guards Transport Aviation Brigade of the Ukrainian Air Force.

== 2022 missile strike ==
The airport was damaged on 6 March 2022 when it was hit by eight Kh-101 cruise missiles launched from the territory of the Black Sea during the 2022 Russian invasion of Ukraine.

== Airlines and destinations ==
As of July 2020, there were no regular-scheduled services at the airport. It was used for irregular charter operations to destinations in Mediterranean, such as Montenegro, Egypt and Turkey. Around Rosh Hashanah, there were irregular charter flights to Ben Gurion Airport in Tel Aviv, Israel.

== Statistics ==
Year	Passengers	Change on previous year	Flights	Change on previous year
2015	9,800	–	–	–
2016	29,002	▲195.9%	442	–
2017	52,942	▲82,5%	802	▲81,4%
2018	60,873	▲15%	1,344	▲67,5%

== Nearest airports ==
The nearest airports are located in Vinnytsia and in Bar, Ukraine. One of the main radars used to support the Vinnytsia International Airport operations is situated in Bar.

== See also ==
- List of airports in Ukraine
- List of the busiest airports in Ukraine
- List of the busiest airports in Europe
- List of the busiest airports in the former USSR
- Transportation in Ukraine
