= List of the busiest airports in Ukraine =

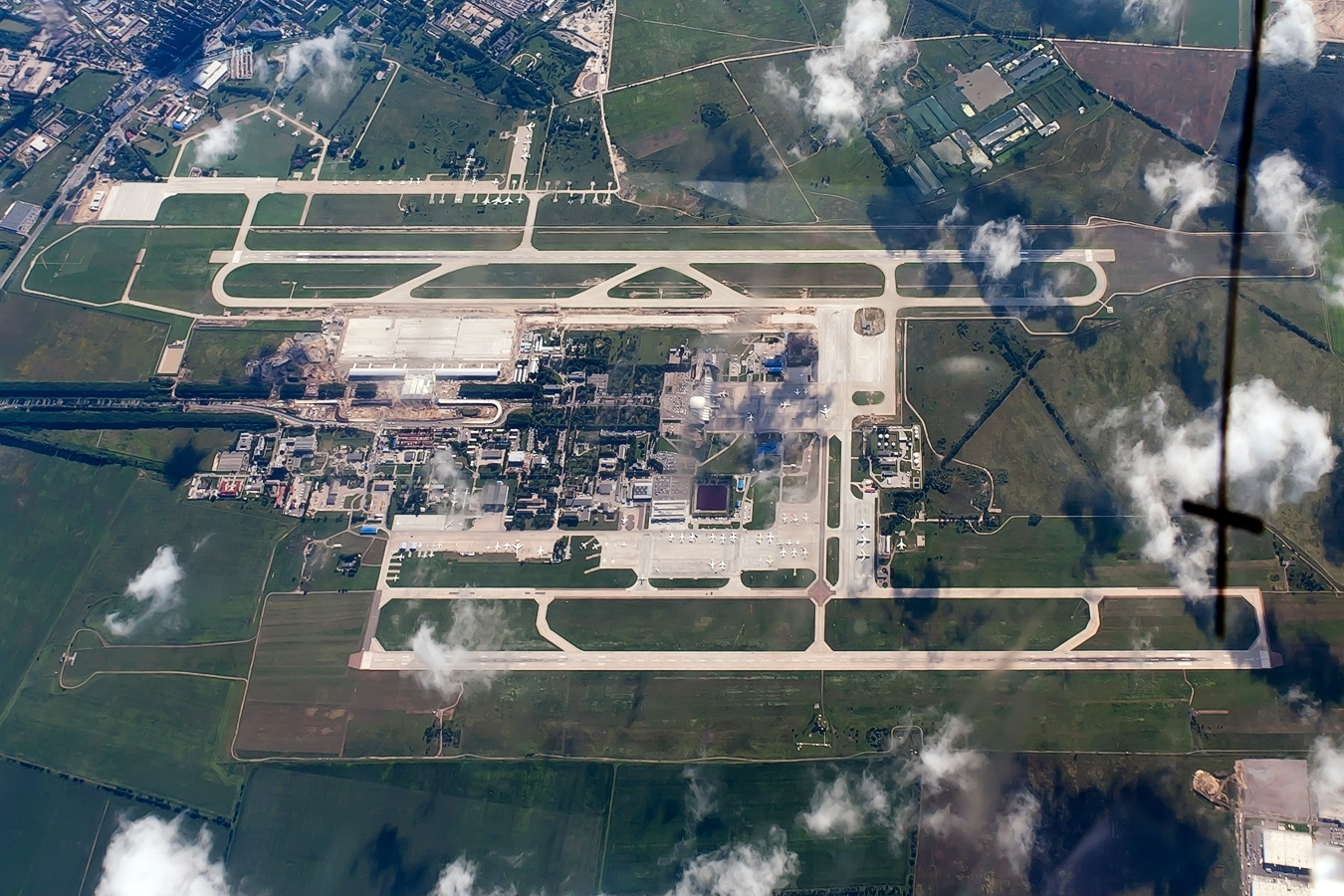
Boryspil International Airport, the busiest airport in Ukraine

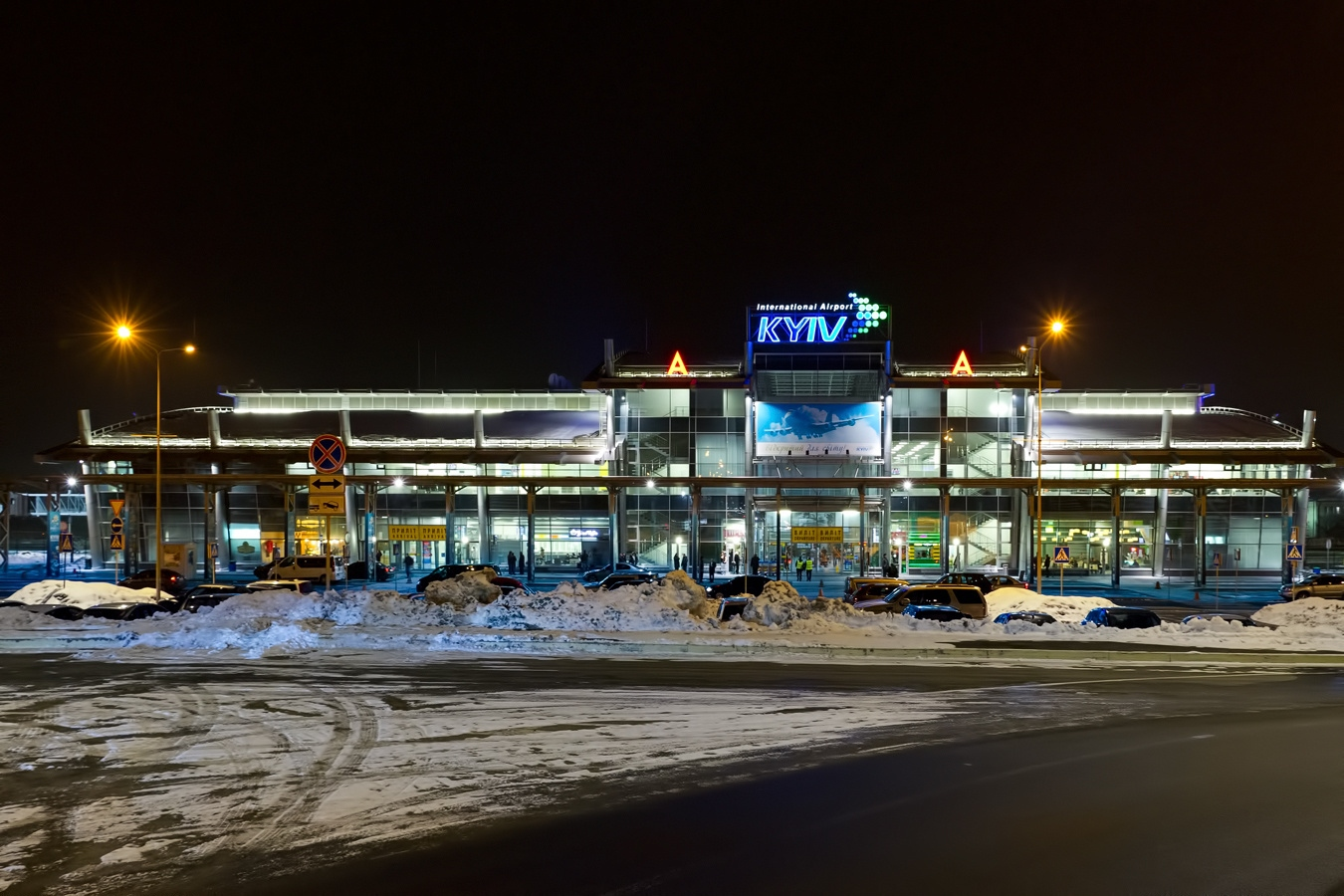
Kyiv International Airport (Zhuliany), second airport in Kyiv, one of the busiest business aviation hubs in Europe

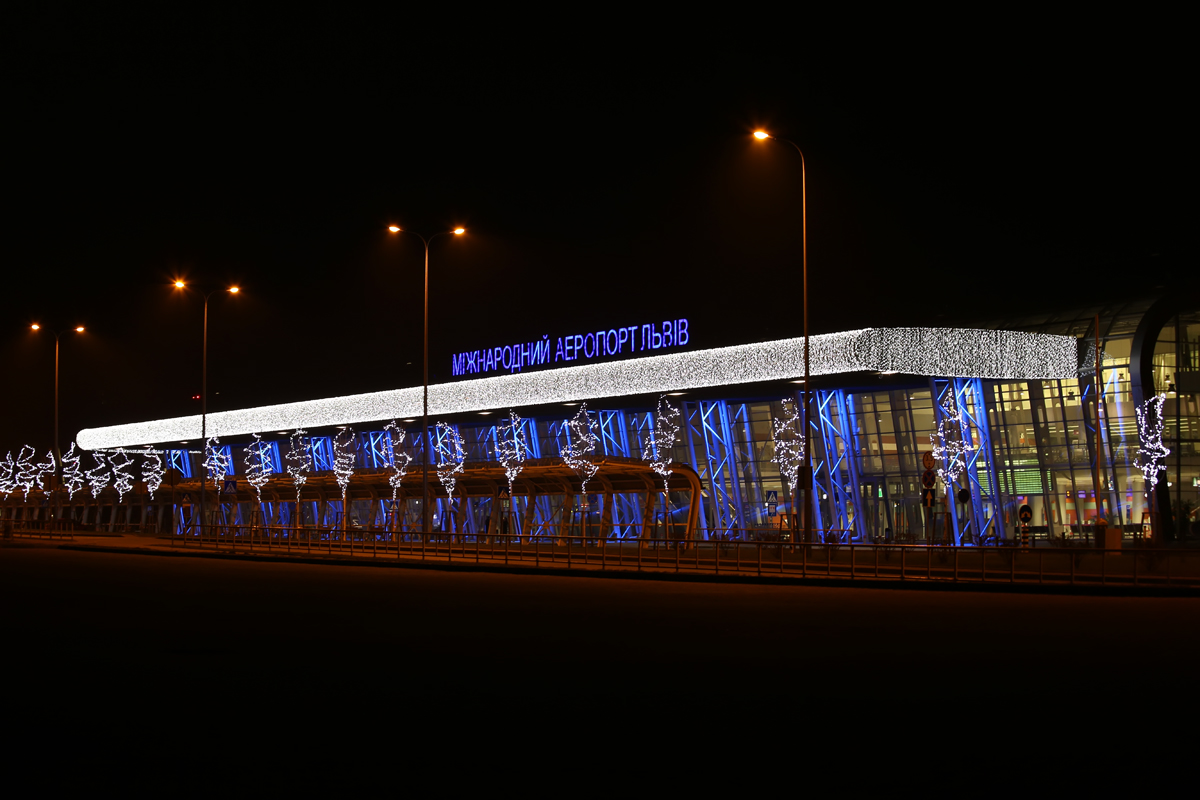
Lviv Danylo Halytskyi International Airport

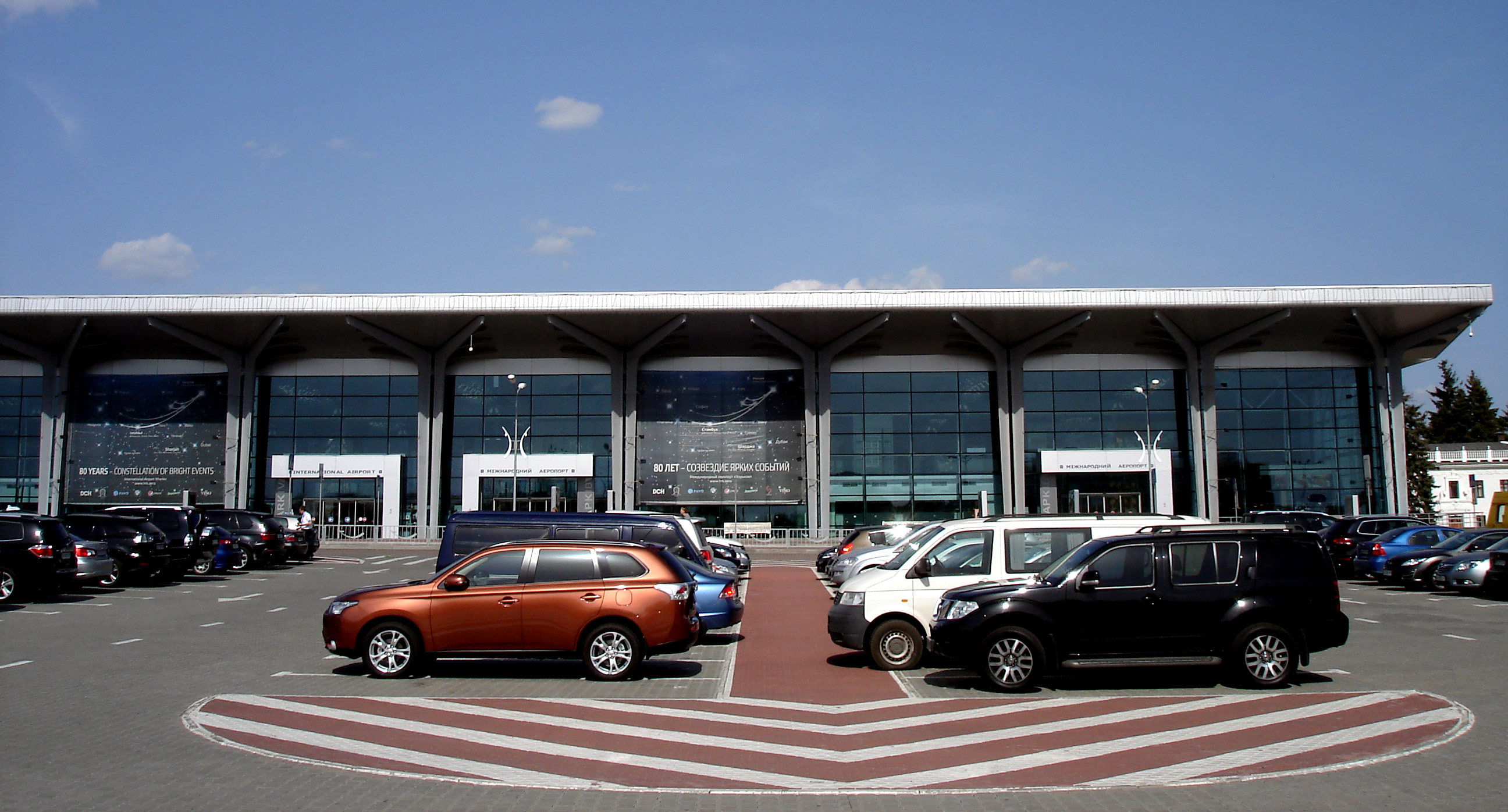
Kharkiv International Airport

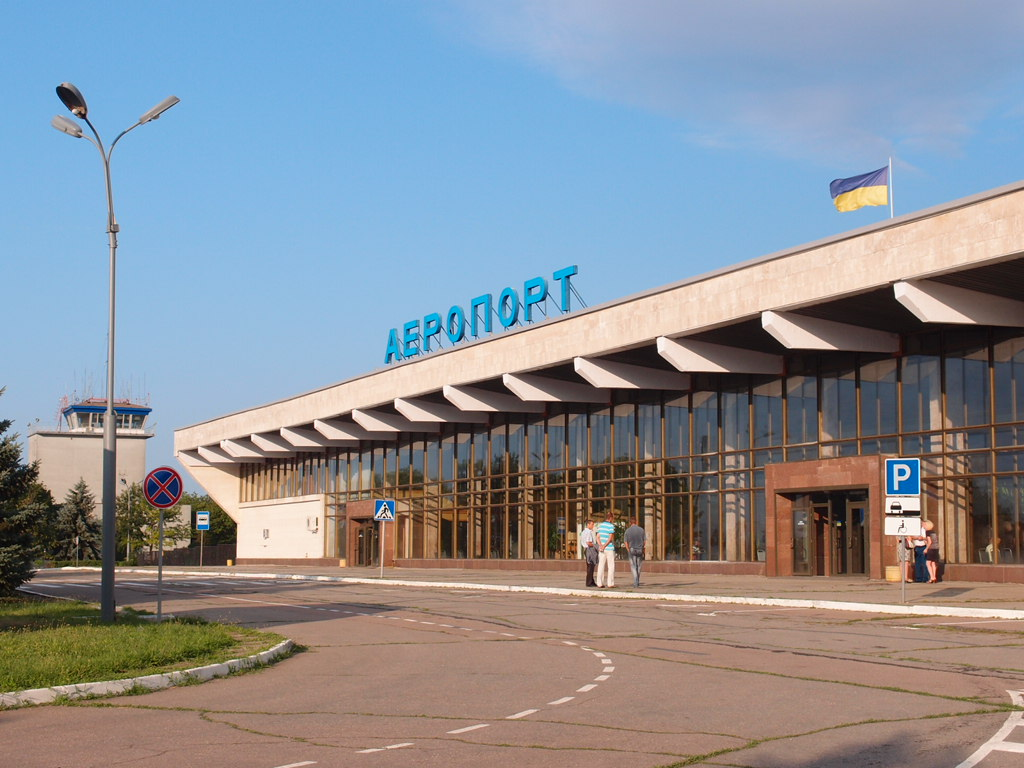
Kherson International Airport

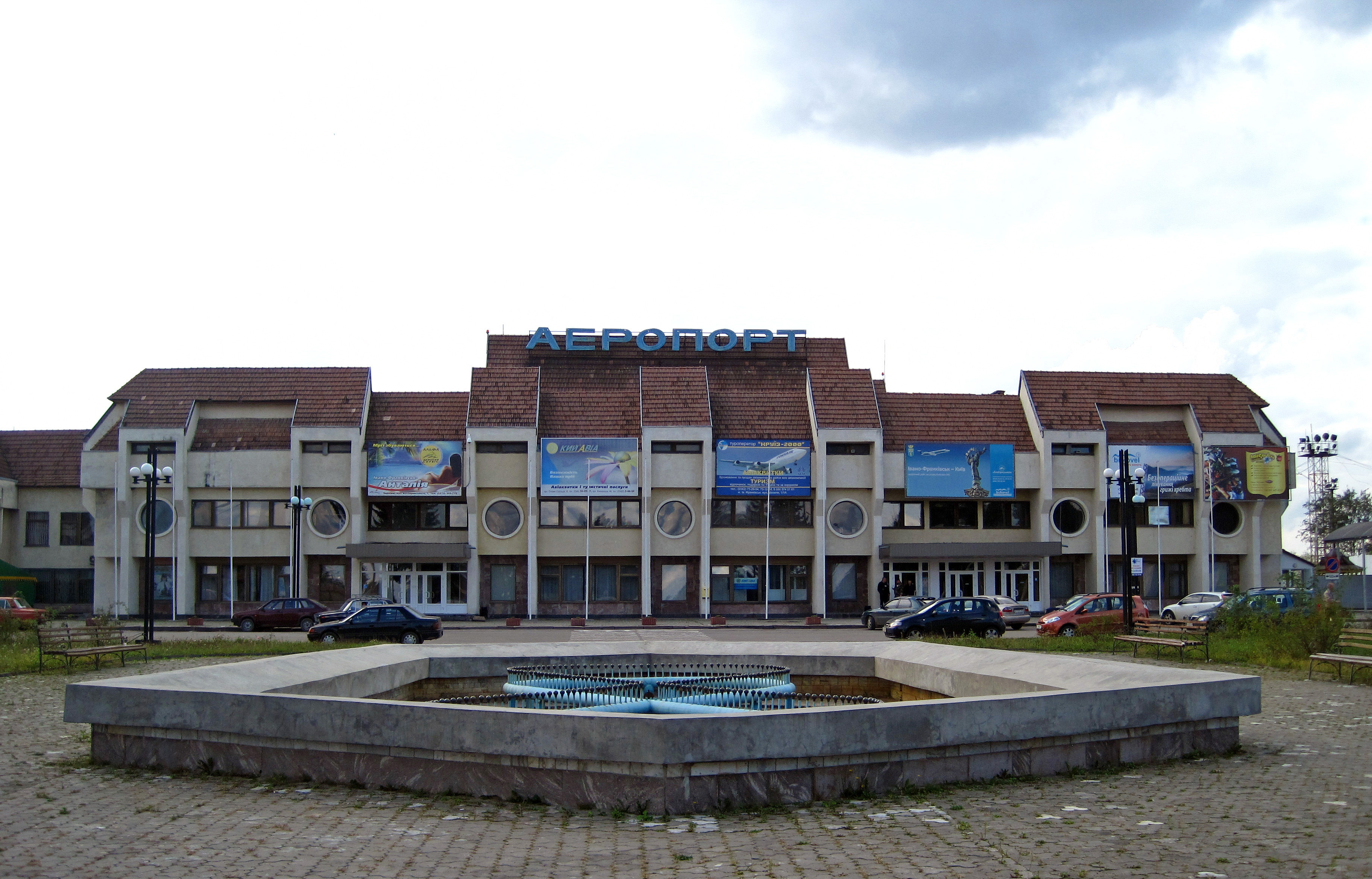
Ivano-Frankivsk International Airport

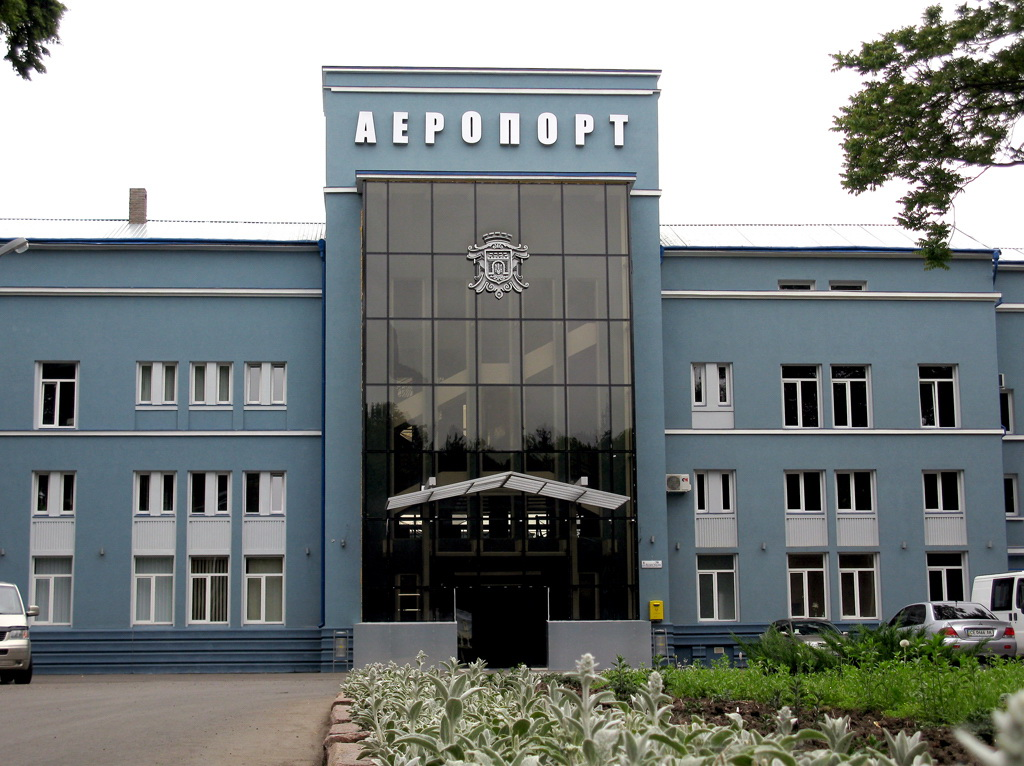
Chernivtsi International Airport

This is a list of the busiest airports in Ukraine.

== 2019 ==
Rank	Airport	City	Code (IATA/ICAO)	Passengers (2018)	Passengers (2019)	Change
1.	Boryspil International Airport	Kyiv	KBP/UKBB	12,603,000	15,260,281	▲21,1%
–	Simferopol International Airport (Note: Subject of a territorial dispute between Ukraine and Russia. Controlled by Russia)	Simferopol	SIP/UKFF	5,146,095	5,140,000	▼0,1%
2.	Kyiv International Airport (Zhuliany)	Kyiv	IEV/UKKK	2,812,300	2,617,900	▼6,9%
3.	Lviv International Airport	Lviv	LWO/UKLL	1,598,700	2,217,400	▲38,8%
4.	Odesa International Airport	Odesa	ODS/UKOO	1,446,521	1,686,365	▲16,6%
5.	Kharkiv International Airport	Kharkiv	HRK/UKHH	961,500	1,340,000	▲40,0%
6.	Zaporizhzhia International Airport	Zaporizhzhia	OZH/UKDE	400,326	434,000	▲8.4%
7.	Dnipro International Airport	Dnipro	DNK/UKDD	299,250	338,888	▲13.2%
8.	Kherson International Airport	Kherson	KHE/UKOH	150,100	154,046	▲2,6%
9.	Ivano-Frankivsk International Airport	Ivano-Frankivsk	IFO/UKLI	112,607	114,700	▲1.9%
10.	Chernivtsi International Airport	Chernivtsi	CWC/UKLN	73,075	76,832	▲3,9%
11.	Havryshivka Vinnytsia International Airport	Vinnytsia	VIN/UKWW	60,873	40,124	▼34.0%
12.	Mykolaiv Airport	Mykolaiv	NLV/UKON	256	22,700	▲8767,2%
13.	Kryvyi Rih International Airport	Kryvyi Rih	KWG/UKDR	21,964	21,329	▼2.9%
14.	Rivne International Airport	Rivne	RWN/UKLR	6,403	11,183	▲72%
15.	Poltava Airport	Poltava	PLV/UKHP	968	5,036	▲420,2%
16.	Uzhhorod International Airport	Uzhhorod	UDJ/UKLU	250	2,782	▲441,2%
Total				20,545,500	24,336,600	▲18,5%

== 2018 ==
Rank	Airport	City	Code (IATA/ICAO)	Passengers (2017)	Passengers (2018)	Change
1.	Boryspil International Airport	Kyiv	KBP/UKBB	10,554,757	12,603,000	▲19.4%
–	Simferopol International Airport	Simferopol	SIP/URFF	5,128,738	5,146,095	Steady
2.	Kyiv International Airport (Zhuliany)	Kyiv	IEV/UKKK	1,851,700	2,812,300	▲51.9%
3.	Lviv International Airport	Lviv	LWO/UKLL	1,080,000	1,598,700	▲48.0%
4.	Odesa International Airport	Odesa	ODS/UKOO	1,228,102	1,446,521	▲17,7%
5.	Kharkiv International Airport	Kharkiv	HRK/UKHH	806,200	961,500	▲19.3%
6.	Zaporizhzhia International Airport	Zaporizhzhia	OZH/UKDE	348,438	400,326	▲14.9%
7.	Dnipro International Airport	Dnipro	DNK/UKDD	276,954	299,250	▲8%
8.	Kherson International Airport	Kherson	KHE/UKOH	105,900	150,100	▲41.7%
9.	Ivano-Frankivsk International Airport	Ivano-Frankivsk	IFO/UKLI	110,000	112,607	▲2,4%
10.	Chernivtsi International Airport	Chernivtsi	CWC/UKLN	48,211	73,075	▲51.5%
11.	Havryshivka Vinnytsia International Airport	Vinnytsia	VIN/UKWW	52,942	60,873	▲15%
12.	Kryvyi Rih International Airport	Kryvyi Rih	KWG/UKDR	32,504	21,964	▼32,4%
13.	Rivne International Airport	Rivne	RWN/UKLR	3,472	6,403	▲84,4%
14.	Poltava Airport	Poltava	PLV/UKHP	-	968	
15.	Mykolaiv Airport	Mykolaiv	NLV/UKON	-	256	
16.	Uzhhorod International Airport	Uzhhorod	UDJ/UKLU	182	250	▲37,4%
Total				16,499,500	20,545,500	▲24.5%

== 2017 ==
Rank	Airport	City	Code (IATA/ICAO)	Passengers (2016)	Passengers (2017)	Change
1.	Boryspil International Airport	Kyiv	KBP/UKBB	8,650,000	10,554,757	▲22,1%
2.	Simferopol International Airport	Simferopol	SIP/URFF	5,201,690	5,128,738	▼1.4%
3.	Kyiv International Airport (Zhuliany)	Kyiv	IEV/UKKK	1,127,500	1,851,700	▲64.2%
4.	Odesa International Airport	Odesa	ODS/UKOO	1,033,560	1,228,102	▲18,3%
5.	Lviv International Airport	Lviv	LWO/UKLL	738,000	1,080,000	▲46.3%
6.	Kharkiv International Airport	Kharkiv	HRK/UKHH	599,700	806,200	▲35%
7.	Zaporizhzhia International Airport	Zaporizhzhia	OZH/UKDE	275,421	348,438	▲26.5%
8.	Dnipro International Airport	Dnipro	DNK/UKDD	284,914	276,954	▼2.8%
9.	Ivano-Frankivsk International Airport	Ivano-Frankivsk	IFO/UKLI	98,100	110,600	▲12.7%
10.	Kherson International Airport	Kherson	KHE/UKOH	62,557	105,900	▲69.3%
11.	Havryshivka Vinnytsia International Airport	Vinnytsia	VIN/UKWW	29,002	52,942	▲82.5%
12.	Chernivtsi International Airport	Chernivtsi	CWC/UKLN	12,673	48,211	▲277.9%
13.	Kryvyi Rih International Airport	Kryvyi Rih	KWG/UKDR	8,958	32,504	▲263%
14.	Rivne International Airport	Rivne	RWN/UKLR	6,997	3,472	▼50.3%
15.	Uzhhorod International Airport	Uzhhorod	UDJ/UKLU	1,404	182	▼87%
Total				12,929,900	16,499,500	▲27.6%

== 2016 ==
Rank	Airport	City	Code (IATA/ICAO)	Passengers (2015)	Passengers (2016)	Change
1.	Boryspil International Airport	Kyiv	KBP/UKBB	7,277,135	8,650,000	▲18.8%
2.	Simferopol International Airport	Simferopol	SIP/URFF	5,018,000	5,202,000	▲3.7%
3.	Kyiv International Airport (Zhuliany)	Kyiv	IEV/UKKK	944,305	1,127,500	▲19.4%
4.	Odesa International Airport	Odesa	ODS/UKOO	949,100	1,033,560	▲8.9%
5.	Lviv International Airport	Lviv	LWO/UKLL	570,570	738,000	▲29.4%
6.	Kharkiv International Airport	Kharkiv	HRK/UKHH	373,625	599,700	▲61%
7.	Dnipro International Airport	Dnipro	DNK/UKDD	346,014	284,914	▼17.7%
8.	Zaporizhzhia International Airport	Zaporizhzhia	OZH/UKDE	128,104	275,421	▲114%
9.	Kherson International Airport	Kherson	KHE/UKOH	61,235	62,557	▲2.2%
10.	Ivano-Frankivsk International Airport	Ivano-Frankivsk	IFO/UKLI	3,261	98,100	▲2908%
11.	Havryshivka Vinnytsia International Airport	Vinnytsia	VIN/UKWW	9,800	29,002	▲196%
12.	Chernivtsi International Airport	Chernivtsi	CWC/UKLN	n/a	12,673	
13.	Kryvyi Rih International Airport	Kryvyi Rih	KWG/UKDR	1,341	8,958	▲568%
14.	Rivne International Airport	Rivne	RWN/UKLR	394	6,997	▲1675%
15.	Uzhhorod International Airport	Uzhhorod	UDJ/UKLU	5,038	1,404	▼72%
Total				10,695,200	12,929,900	▲20.8%

== 2015 ==
Rank	Airport	City	Code (IATA/ICAO)	Passengers (2014)	Passengers (2015)	Change
1.	Boryspil International Airport	Kyiv	KBP/UKBB	6,890,443	7,277,135	▲5.6%
2.	Simferopol International Airport	Simferopol	SIP/URFF	2,800,000	5,018,000	▲79%
3.	Odesa International Airport	Odesa	ODS/UKOO	863,900	949,100	▲9.8%
4.	Kyiv International Airport (Zhuliany)	Kyiv	IEV/UKKK	1,090,025	944,305	▼13.4%
5.	Lviv International Airport	Lviv	LWO/UKLL	585,200	570,570	▼2.5%
6.	Kharkiv International Airport	Kharkiv	HRK/UKHH	437,500	373,625	▼14.6%
7.	Dnipro International Airport	Dnipro	DNK/UKDD	446,798	346,014	▼22.5%
8.	Zaporizhzhia International Airport	Zaporizhzhia	OZH/UKDE	75,400	128,104	▲69.9%
9.	Kherson International Airport	Kherson	KHE/UKOH	7,850	61,235	▲680%
10.	Havryshivka Vinnytsia International Airport	Vinnytsia	VIN/UKWW	n/a	9,800	
11.	Uzhhorod International Airport	Uzhhorod	UDJ/UKLU	12,000	5,038	▼58%
12.	Ivano-Frankivsk International Airport	Ivano-Frankivsk	IFO/UKLI	25,200	3,261	▼87%
Total				10,896,500	10,695,200	▼1.8%

== 2014 ==
Rank	Airport	City	Code (IATA/ICAO)	Passengers (2013)	Passengers (2014)	Change
1.	Boryspil International Airport	Kyiv	KBP/UKBB	7,932,000	6,890,443	▼13.1%
2.	Simferopol International Airport	Simferopol	SIP/URFF	1,208,500	2,800,000	▲130%
3.	Kyiv International Airport (Zhuliany)	Kyiv	IEV/UKKK	1,838,266	1,090,025	▼40.7%
4.	Odesa International Airport	Odesa	ODS/UKOO	1,069,100	863,900	▼19.2%
5.	Lviv International Airport	Lviv	LWO/UKLL	700,800	585,200	▼16.5%
6.	Dnipro International Airport	Dnipro	DNK/UKDD	454,981	446,798	▼1.8%
7.	Kharkiv International Airport	Kharkiv	HRK/UKHH	605,100	437,500	▼27.7%
8.	Donetsk International Airport	Donetsk	DOK/UKCC	1,110,400	346,700 (closed)	▼68.8%
9.	Zaporizhzhia International Airport	Zaporizhzhia	OZH/UKDE	79,845	75,400	▼5.6%
10.	Ivano-Frankivsk International Airport	Ivano-Frankivsk	IFO/UKLI	24,900	25,200	▲1.2%
11.	Uzhhorod International Airport	Uzhhorod	UDJ/UKLU	14,750	12,000	▼18.6%
Total				15,134,600	10,896,500	▼28%

== 2013 ==
Rank	Airport	City	Code (IATA/ICAO)	Passengers (2012)	Passengers (2013)	Change
1.	Boryspil International Airport	Kyiv	KBP/UKBB	8,478,000	7,932,000	▼6.4%
2.	Kyiv International Airport (Zhuliany)	Kyiv	IEV/UKKK	861,900	1,838,266	▲113%
3.	Simferopol International Airport	Simferopol	SIP/UKFF	1,113,900	1,204,500	▲8.1%
4.	Donetsk International Airport	Donetsk	DOK/UKCC	1,000,000	1,110,400	▲11%
5.	Odesa International Airport	Odesa	ODS/UKOO	907,600	1,069,100	▲17.8%
6.	Lviv International Airport	Lviv	LWO/UKLL	576,000	700,800	▲21.7%
7.	Kharkiv International Airport	Kharkiv	HRK/UKHH	501,500	605,100	▲20.7%
8.	Dnipro International Airport	Dnipro	DNK/UKDD	444,150	454,981	▲2.4%
9.	Zaporizhzhia International Airport	Zaporizhzhia	OZH/UKDE	56,788	79,845	▲40.6%
10.	Ivano-Frankivsk International Airport	Ivano-Frankivsk	IFO/UKLI	31,700	24,900	▼21.5%
11.	Uzhhorod International Airport	Uzhhorod	UDJ/UKLU	n/a	14,750	
Total				14,107,000	15,134,600	▲7.3%

== 2012 ==
Rank	Airport	City	Code (IATA/ICAO)	Passengers (2011)	Passengers (2012)	Change
1.	Boryspil International Airport	Kyiv	KBP/UKBB	8,047,115	8,478,000	▲5.4%
2.	Simferopol International Airport	Simferopol	SIP/UKFF	963,800	1,113,900	▲15.6%
3.	Donetsk International Airport	Donetsk	DOK/UKCC	829,300	1,000,000	▲20.6%
4.	Odesa International Airport	Odesa	ODS/UKOO	824,300	907,600	▲10.1%
5.	Kyiv International Airport (Zhuliany)	Kyiv	IEV/UKKK	469,800	861,900	▲83.5%
6.	Lviv International Airport	Lviv	LWO/UKLL	296,900	576,000	▲94%
7.	Kharkiv International Airport	Kharkiv	HRK/UKHH	308,700	501,500	▲62.5%
8.	Dnipro International Airport	Dnipro	DNK/UKDD	426,532	444,150	▲4.1%
9.	Zaporizhzhia International Airport	Zaporizhzhia	OZH/UKDE	56,900	56,788	▼0.2%
10.	Luhansk International Airport	Luhansk	VSG/UKCW	23,500	51,100	▲117%
11.	Ivano-Frankivsk International Airport	Ivano-Frankivsk	IFO/UKLI	116,000	31,700	▼72.7%
12.	Chernivtsi International Airport	Chernivtsi	CWC/UKLN	27,000	27,300	▲1.1%
13.	Mykolaiv Airport	Mykolaiv	NLV/UKON	18,500	22,900	▲23.8%
14.	Havryshivka Vinnytsia International Airport	Vinnytsia	VIN/UKWW	n/a	10,200	
Total				12,464,800	14,107,000	▲13.2%

== 2011 ==
Rank	Airport	City	Code (IATA/ICAO)	Passengers (2010)	Passengers (2011)	Change
1.	Boryspil International Airport	Kyiv	KBP/UKBB	6,694,212	8,047,115	▲20.2%
2.	Simferopol International Airport	Simferopol	SIP/UKFF	845,000	963,800	▲14%
3.	Donetsk International Airport	Donetsk	DOK/UKCC	612,200	829,300	▲35.5%
4.	Odesa International Airport	Odesa	ODS/UKOO	707,100	824,300	▲16.6%
5.	Kyiv International Airport (Zhuliany)	Kyiv	IEV/UKKK	29,000	469,800	▲1520%
6.	Dnipro International Airport	Dnipro	DNK/UKDD	341,430	426,532	▲25%
7.	Kharkiv International Airport	Kharkiv	HRK/UKHH	243,200	308,700	▲27%
8.	Lviv International Airport	Lviv	LWO/UKLL	481,900	296,900	▼38.4%
9.	Ivano-Frankivsk International Airport	Ivano-Frankivsk	IFO/UKLI	30,520	116,000	▲280%
10.	Zaporizhzhia International Airport	Zaporizhzhia	OZH/UKDE	33,386	56,900	▲70.4%
11.	Chernivtsi International Airport	Chernivtsi	CWC/UKLN	n/a	27,000	
12.	Luhansk International Airport	Luhansk	VSG/UKCW	27,420	23,500	▼14.3%
13.	Mykolaiv Airport	Mykolaiv	NLV/UKON	n/a	18,500	
14.	Uzhhorod International Airport	Uzhhorod	UDJ/UKLU	n/a	10,000	
Total				10,242,500	12,464,800	▲21.7%

== 2010 ==
Rank	Airport	City	Code (IATA/ICAO)	Passengers (2009)	Passengers (2010)	Change
1.	Boryspil International Airport	Kyiv	KBP/UKBB	5,795,100	6,694,212	▲15.5%
2.	Simferopol International Airport	Simferopol	SIP/UKFF	751,000	845,000	▲12.5%
3.	Odesa International Airport	Odesa	ODS/UKOO	650,900	707,100	▲8.6%
4.	Donetsk International Airport	Donetsk	DOK/UKCC	488,100	612,200	▲25.4%
5.	Lviv International Airport	Lviv	LWO/UKLL	452,300	481,900	▲6.5%
6.	Dnipro International Airport	Dnipro	DNK/UKDD	n/a	341,430	
7.	Kharkiv International Airport	Kharkiv	HRK/UKHH	196,200	243,200	▲24%
8.	Zaporizhzhia International Airport	Zaporizhzhia	OZH/UKDE	33,960	33,386	▼1.7%
9.	Ivano-Frankivsk International Airport	Ivano-Frankivsk	IFO/UKLI	96,300	30,520	▼68.3%
10.	Kyiv International Airport (Zhuliany)	Kyiv	IEV/UKKK	12,080	29,000	▲140%
11.	Luhansk International Airport	Luhansk	VSG/UKCW	n/a	27,420	
14.	Havryshivka Vinnytsia International Airport	Vinnytsia	VIN/UKWW	n/a	3,000	
Total				8,894,900	10,242,500	▲15.2%

== See also ==
- List of airports in Ukraine
- List of the busiest airports in Europe
- Transport in Ukraine
- List of the busiest airports in the former USSR
