= Kryvyi Rih International Airport =

Kryvyi Rih (Lozuvatka) International Airport "Міжнародний аеропорт Кривий Ріг (Лозуватка)"
- IATA: KWG; ICAO: UKDR

Summary
- Airport type: Public
- Owner: Kryvyi Rih City
- Operator: Kryvyi Rih Airport
- Serves: Kryvyi Rih, rest Central and Southern Ukraine
- Location: Kryvyi Rih, Ukraine
- Hub for: Air Urga; Yuzhmashavia
- Elevation AMSL: 408 ft / 124 m
- Coordinates: 48°02′35″N 033°12′25″E
- Website: http://www.kwg.aero/

Maps
- Location of Kryvyi Rih Airport in Ukraine
- Interactive map of Kryvyi Rih (Lozuvatka) International Airport

Runways
Direction	Length		Surface
Direction	m	ft	Surface
18/36	2,500	8,202	Concrete

Statistics (2017)
- Passengers: ▲32,504
- Cargo: ▼30.1+ Tons

Kryvyi Rih/Lozuvatka International Airport (Ukrainian: Міжнародний аеропорт Кривий Ріг (Лозуватка)) (IATA: KWG, ICAO: UKDR) is an airport near Kryvyi Rih, Ukraine. It is located 4.2 km (2.6 miles) west of the Lozuvatka rural community, and 17.5 km (10.9 Miles) northwest of the city of Kryvyi Rih.

== History ==
From 2001, Kryvyi Rih International Airport is in the communal property of the city for the purpose of financial support. On 24 December 2003, the city council decided to approve a program of financial support and development for KP Kryvyi Rih International Airport. The airport municipal company remained unprofitable as of January 2012.

In 2004, revenues from the enterprise core and supporting activities amounted up to 1m hryvn (almost 200 000 USD). Aircraft carried out internal flights to Lviv, Kyiv, and Donetsk and international flights to Istanbul, Anakena, Zagreb, Moscow, Thessaloniki, and other cities. They transported 5.7 thousand passengers and 46.9 tons of cargo.

The airport has been shelled during the Russian invasion of Ukraine as part of the Bombing of Kryvyi Rih. On Monday, September 26, the Russians attacked Kryvyi Rih with a X-59 missile. As a result of the missile strike, the infrastructure of the airport was damaged.

== Airlines and destinations ==
As of 8 October 2021, there are no scheduled routes at the airport, following the closure of the sole domestic service by Windrose Airlines to Kyiv–Boryspil.

== Statistics ==
Annual passenger statistics
Year	Total passengers	Change from previous year
2015	1,341	-
2016	8,958	▲568.0%
2017	32,504	▲262.4%

== See also ==
- List of airports in Ukraine
- List of the busiest airports in Ukraine
- List of the busiest airports in Europe
- List of the busiest airports in the former USSR
