= Uzhhorod International Airport =

Uzhhorod International Airport Міжнародний аеропорт "Ужгород"
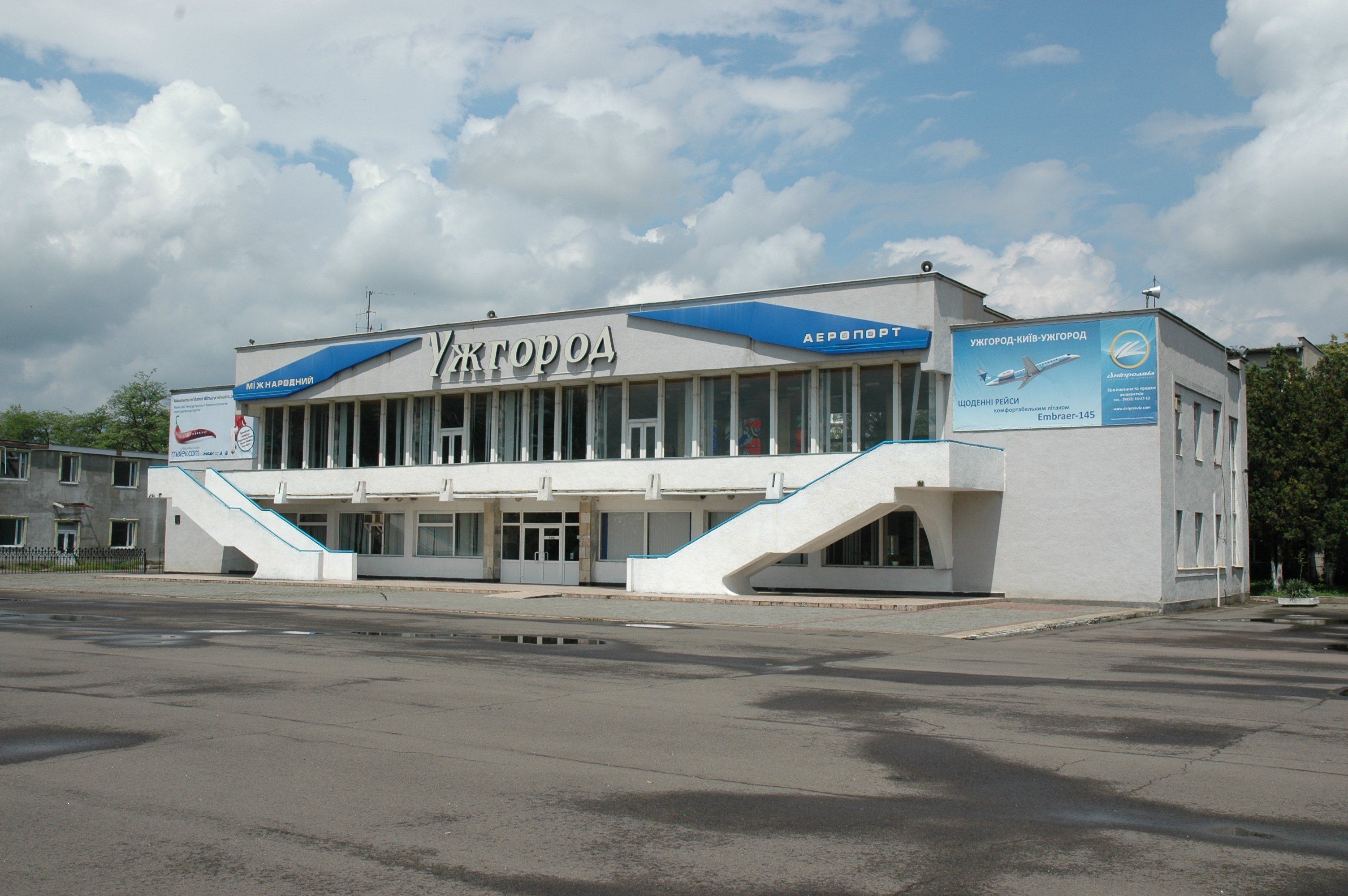
- IATA: UDJ; ICAO: UKLU

Summary
- Airport type: Public
- Owner: Zakarpattia Regional State Administration
- Operator: Government
- Serves: Zakarpattia and Eastern Slovakia
- Location: Uzhhorod
- Elevation AMSL: 383 ft (117 m)
- Coordinates: 48°38′03″N 22°15′48″E

Maps
- Location of airport in Ukraine UDJ (Ukraine) UDJ (Europe)
- Interactive map of Uzhhorod International Airport

Runways
Direction	Length		Surface
Direction	m	ft	Surface
10/28	2,038	6,686	Asphalt

Statistics (2019)
- Passengers: ▲2,782

Uzhhorod International Airport, (Ukrainian: Міжнародний аеропорт «Ужгород», romanized: Mizhnarodnyy aeroport "Uzhhorod"; Slovak: Medzinárodné letisko "Užhorod"; (IATA: UDJ, ICAO: UKLU) is an international airport located in the city of Uzhhorod, in the western Ukrainian province of Zakarpattia. The airport is situated in the westernmost part of the city, in the Chervenytsia district at 145, Sobranetska Street. It is a small airport, serving Uzhhorod and the whole oblast. The airport's runway begins 90 meters from the Ukrainian-Slovak international border, so planes must use Slovak airspace for some take-offs and landings under special treaty.

== History ==
The airport was not operational from 2016 (except for several months in 2019 when Motor Sich Airlines tried to operate flights) until June 2021. At the end of 2018, the airport received a certificate from the European Aviation Safety Agency (EASA). On 15 March 2019, the airport resumed servicing regular flights. On 24 September 2020, Slovakia and Ukraine signed an agreement on the above-mentioned special treaty. Windrose Airlines performed the first regular flight on the route Kyiv - Uzhhorod on 2 June 2021.

On 9 September 2021 the airport became fully operational. Until then, flights were carried out according to the so-called visual flight rules.

On 24 February 2022, Ukraine closed its airspace to civilian flights due to the Russian invasion of Ukraine. If Russia was to target the airport using missiles with bad precision, a missile could accidentally land on Slovak territory, meaning that Russia would be bombing an EU and NATO member.

The airport is guarded by the Chop Border Detachment.

== Airlines and destinations ==
The following airlines operate regular scheduled and charter services to and from Uzhhorod International Airport.

As of 24 February 2022, all passenger flights have been suspended indefinitely.

Airlines	Destinations
Windrose Airlines	Kyiv–Boryspil

== Statistics ==
Year	Total passengers	Change from previous year
2011	10,000	
2013	14,750	▲47%
2014	12,000	▼18.6%
2015	5,038	▼58%
2016	1,404	▼72.1%
2017	182	▼87%
2018	250	▲37%
2019	2,782	▲441.24%

== See also ==
- List of airports in Ukraine
- List of the busiest airports in Ukraine
- List of the busiest airports in Europe
- List of the busiest airports in the former USSR
