= Ivano-Frankivsk International Airport =

Airport in Ukraine

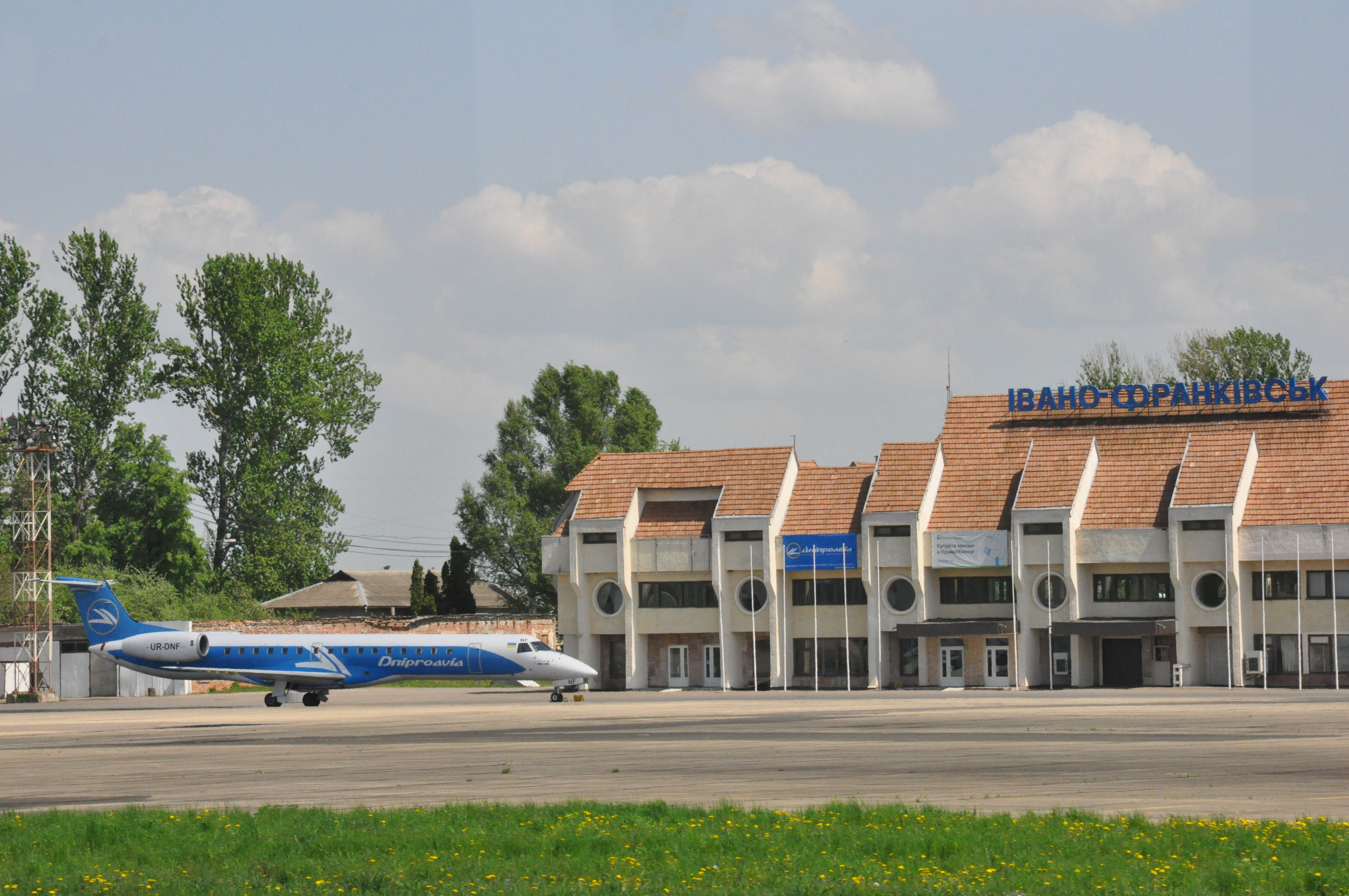
- IATA: IFO; ICAO: UKLI

Summary
- Airport type: Public/Military
- Serves: Ivano-Frankivsk
- Location: Ivano-Frankivsk, Ivano-Frankivsk Oblast, Ukraine
- Elevation AMSL: 919 ft (280 m)
- Coordinates: 48°53′03″N 24°41′10″E
- Website: ifo.aero

Maps
- Location of airport in Ukraine IFO (Ukraine)
- Interactive map of Ivano-Frankivsk; International Airport

Runways
Direction	Length		Surface
Direction	ft	m	Surface
10/28	8,226	2,507	Concrete

Statistics (2017)
- Passengers: ▲110,600

Ivano-Frankivsk International Airport (Ukrainian Міжнародний аеропорт Івано-Франківськ) (IATA: IFO, ICAO: UKLI) is an airport in Ivano-Frankivsk, Ukraine, some 4.4 km (2.7 mi) by road from the town center.

== Overview ==
Ivano-Frankivsk airport is an international airport and has maintained border and customs operations since 1992. The airport is located at the site of the former village of Opryshivtsi. Its traffic capacity is claimed to be 400 passengers per hour. Officials have made efforts in the past to promote the airport and its relative proximity to the Bukovel ski area, Vorokhta and the Carpathian National Nature Park, and other quiet, spectacular mountain environments.

It is a joint military-civil airfield. It's civilian part is guarded by the Chernivtsi Detachment. A second concrete runway, 6,325 ft (1,928 m) long, is now used by the military as a parking lot, and a large apron (located northwest of the civilian terminal) is still in use by the Ukrainian Air Force (the 114th Tactical Aviation Brigade is based at the airfield and has Mikoyan MiG-29 fighter jets).

The base was also home to the:

- 277th Mlavskiy Red Banner Bomber Aviation Regiment between 1950 and May 1954.

On 24 February 2022, Ukraine closed its airspace to civilian flights due to the Russian invasion. The base was airstriked and significantly damaged by Russian armed forces at dawn on 11 March 2022 during the Russian invasion of Ukraine.

== Airlines and destinations ==
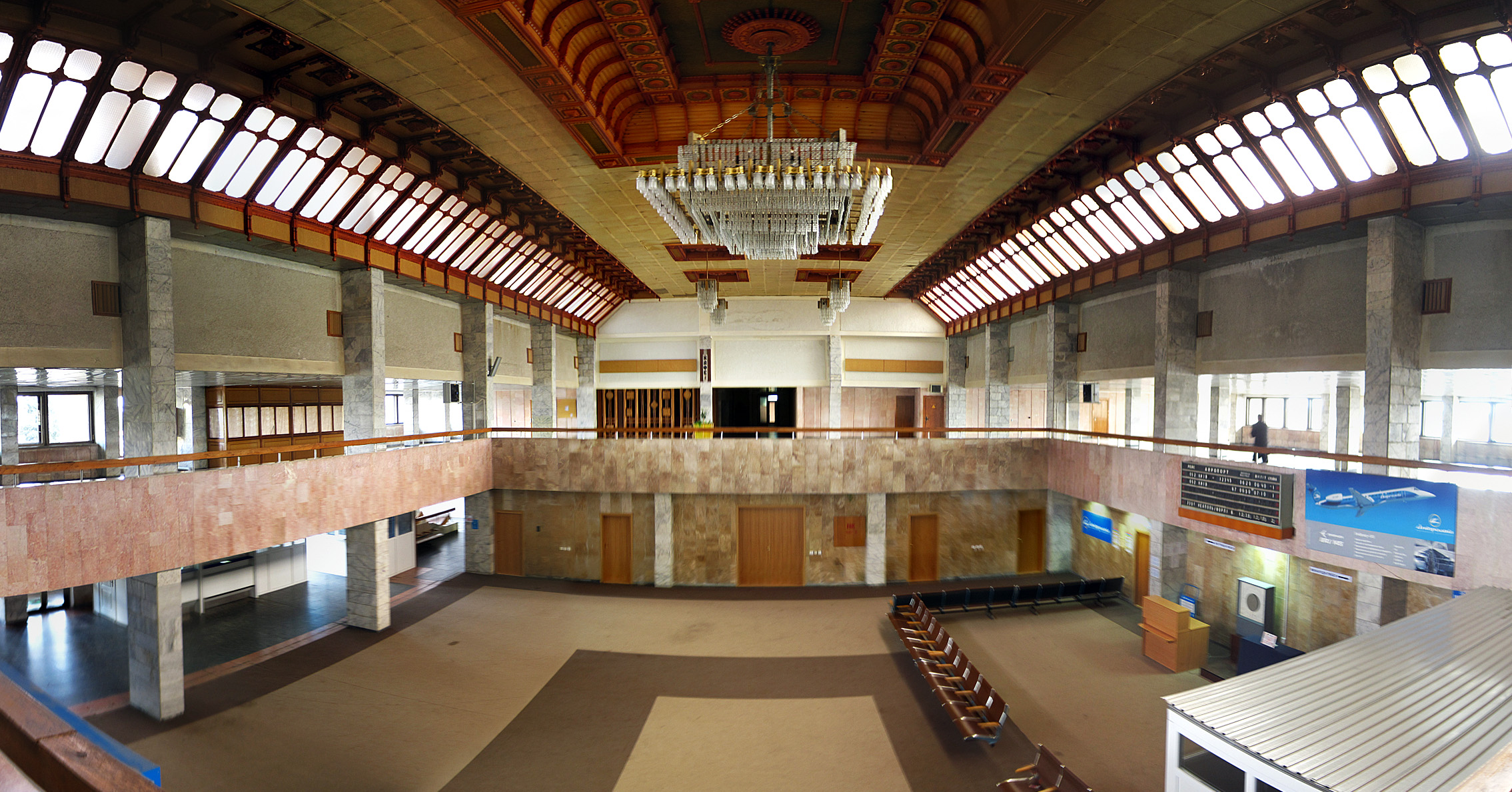
Interior of the airport

The following airlines operate regular scheduled and charter flights at the airport:

As of 24 February 2022, all passenger flights have been suspended indefinitely.

Airlines	Destinations
Windrose Airlines	Kyiv–Boryspil

== Statistics ==
Year	Passengers	Change on previous year
2009	96,300	
2010	30,520	▼68.3%
2011	116,000	▲280%
2012	31,700	▼72.7%
2013	24,900	▼21.5%
2014	25,200	▲1.2%
2015	3,261	▼87%
2016	98,100	▲2908.0%
2017	110,600	▲12.7%
2018	112,607	▲2.4%

== See also ==
- List of airports in Ukraine
- List of the busiest airports in Ukraine
- List of the busiest airports in Europe
- List of the busiest airports in the former USSR
