= Shostka (disambiguation) =

Shostka is a city in Sumy Oblast, northeastern Ukraine.

Shostka may also refer to:

- FC Shostka, Ukraine
- Shostka Border Detachment, Ukraine
- Shostka railway station, Ukraine
- Shostka Raion, Ukraine
- Shostka (Desna tributary), tiver in Ukraine
- Shostka (Tma tributary), river in Russia
