= Mukachevo Border Detachment =

27th Mukachevo Border Detachment
- 27 прикордонний загін імені героїв Карпатської Січі (Ukrainian)
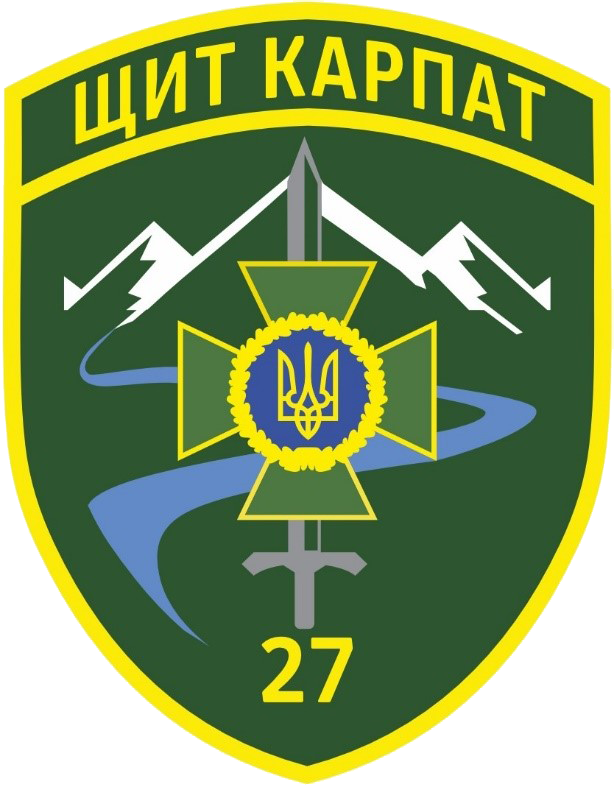
- Detachment Insignia
- Founded: 1992
- Country: Ukraine
- Allegiance: Ministry of Internal Affairs
- Branch: State Border Guard Service of Ukraine
- Type: Brigade
- Role: Border Guard
- Part of: State Border Guard Service of Ukraine
- Garrison/HQ: Mukachevo
- Nickname: Heroes of Carpathian Sich
- Engagements: Russo-Ukrainian war: War in Donbass; Russian invasion of Ukraine; Eastern Ukraine campaign

Commanders
- Current commander: Colonel Oleksandr Osypets

Insignia
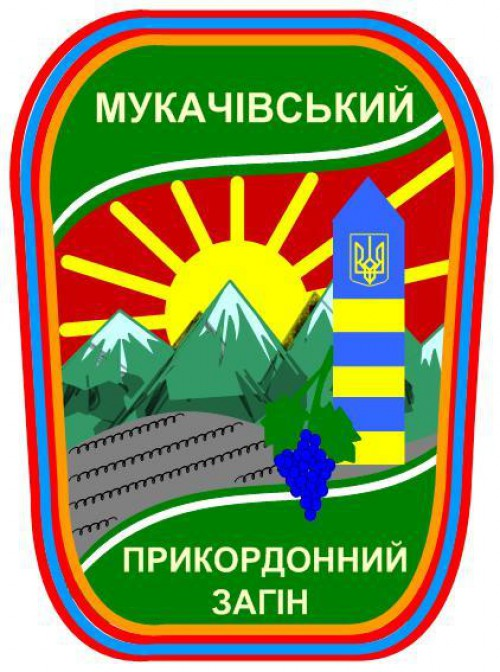
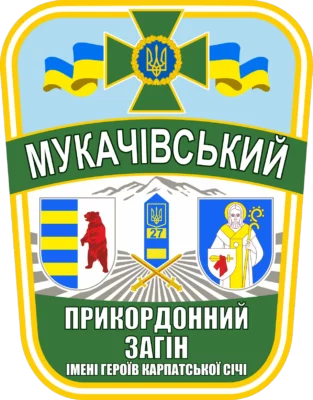
- Former Insignia

The Mukachevo Border Detachment "Hero of Carpathian Sich" (MUN 2142) is a brigade level detachment of the Western Department of the State Border Service of Ukraine. The detachment guards the Romania-Ukraine border and the Hungary-Ukraine border in five Raions (Berehove Raion, Vynohradiv Raion, Khust Raion, Tiachiv Raion and Rakhiv Raion) of Zakarpattia Oblast. The detachment guards a border length of 316.2 km, 112.3 km with Hungary and 203.9 km with Romania with 121 km on plains, 120 km on river and 75.2 km on mountainous terrain.

== History ==
It was established on 25 April 1944 in Baku by order of NKVD to protect the border of Azerbaijan SSR with Colonel Zdorny Guriy Kostiantynovych becoming its first commander and its establishment was completed on 1 May 1944. On 30 April 1975, the border detachment was awarded the Order of the Red Banner and was transferred to Zakarpattia. In 1991, when Ukraine, the Mukachevo border detachment came under the jurisdiction of Ukraine. On 1 July 2003, a part of the detachment joined the newly formed Chop Border Detachment.

On the night of 14 November 2014, in the city of Kurakhove, the deputy commander of the detachment Artem Mykolayovych Kokhany witnessed the bandits who stealing a car from a local taxi driver to which he immediately responded, momentarily gaining control, soon a VAZ-21099 with three additional men arrived at the scene and killed the officer using firearms. On 7 April 2016, the detachment detained two illegal border crossers. On 5 February 2017, the detachment detained an illegal Ivorian immigrant. On 24 August 2018, the detachment received the honorary name of "Heroes of the Carpathian Sich". On 15 November 2018, during a joint operation with Romanian border guards to stop smugglers, near the Tisza River, Ukrainian border guards detained a man in a wetsuit with a large bag of money and during the initial questioning of the detainee, the head of the "Business" department was hit by another unknown person with an Audi resulting in the death of Major Vadim Mykolayovych Berezenskyi two days later.

Following the Russian invasion of Ukraine, the main duties of the detachment shifted from preventing smuggling to preventing illegal border crossing. the detachment also saw combat on the frontlines. On 29 March 2022, the detachment detained 53 people trying to cross the border illegally. On 11 April 2023, the detachment detained 6 draft dodgers trying to illegally cross the border. In October 2023, the detachment detained 26 border violators. On 24 May 2024, two men from Romania attacked a post of the detachment and captured weaponry but were later detained in Romania. On 10 June 2024, Border Guard of Hungary detained three draft dodgers in the area of operations of the detachment. On 16 June 2024, the detachment detained three German and Italian citizens trying to cross the border without documents. On 9 October 2024, the detachment detained five fugitives trying to cross the border. On 3 November 2024, the detachment detained four person's illegally crossing into Hungary. Since the start of invasion, the detachment has recovered 19 dead bodies of draft dodgers from Tysa river till early 2023, a toll which later rose to 42. Moreover, 56 criminal organizations were also destroyed by the detachment.

== Structure ==
The detachment includes:

- Management and Headquarters
- Border Service Department "Goronglab"
- Border Service Department "Kosino"
- Border Service Department "Luzhanka"
- Border Service Department "Bodalovo"
- Border Service Department "Vylok"
- Border Service Department "Velika Palady"
- Border Service Department "Dyakovo"
- Border Service Department "Dyula"
- Border Service Department "Khyzha"
- Border Service Department "Veliatino"
- Border Service Department "Yablunivka"
- Border Service Department "Tyachiv"
- Border Service Department "Solotvyno"
- Border Service Department "Veliky Bychkiv"
- Border Service Department "Dilove"
- Border Service Department "Bohdan"
- Mobile Border Outpost "Mukacheve"
- Guardian units

There are 7 checkpoints in the area of responsibility of the detachment.

== Commanders ==
- Colonel Fedotov M. P. (1991)
- Colonel Lisovyi Y. N. (1991–1993)
- Colonel Stepaniuk O. T. (1993–1995)
- Colonel Miroshnychenko Y. M. (1995–1998)
- Colonel Lebedynsky A. N. (1998–1999)
- Colonel Binkovsky O. N. (1999–2003)
- Colonel T. R. Usmanov (2003–2004)
- Colonel Oleg Evgenovich Tsevelev (2004–2006)
- Lieutenant Colonel Motroshilov V. I. (2006–2008)
- Colonel Levadnyi I. A. (2008–2011)
- Lieutenant Colonel Bezpalko Kostyantyn Serhiyovych (2011–2012)
- Lieutenant Colonel Yuriy Leonidovych Filipchuk (2012-2012)
- Colonel Lishchynskyi D. N. (2016–2017)
- Colonel Dudarev Ruslan I. (2017)
- Colonel Pavlo Georgiyovych Shvartsman (2017–2019)
- Colonel Domeniuk I. M. (2019–2021)
- Colonel Rymarchuk Ihor Ivanovich (January 2021-August 2021)
- Colonel Andriy Serhiyevich Kulesh September (2021–2023)
- Colonel Bohdan Ignatyuk (2023-)
