= Odesa Border Aviation Squadron =

24th Odesa Aviation Squadron
- 24-та окрема авіаційна ескадрилья (Ukrainian)
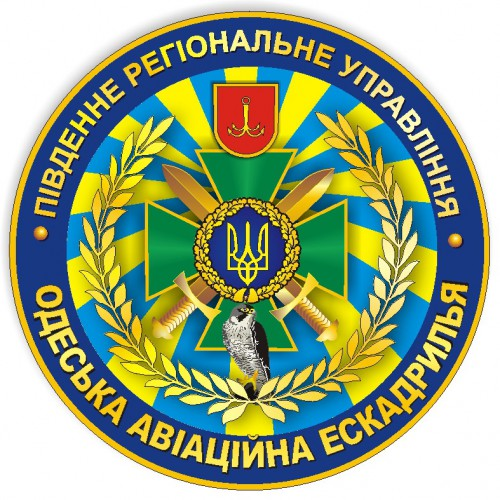
- Squadron insignia
- Founded: 1992
- Country: Ukraine
- Allegiance: Ministry of Internal Affairs
- Branch: State Border Guard Service of Ukraine
- Type: Brigade
- Role: Air border guard
- Part of: State Border Guard Service of Ukraine
- Garrison/HQ: Odesa
- Engagements: Russo-Ukrainian war: War in Donbass; Battle of the Border; Russian invasion of Ukraine

Commanders
- Current commander: Colonel Artem Zabrodotskyi

The 24th Separate Odesa Aviation Squadron (MUN 9997) is an aviation squadron of the State Border Guard Service of Ukraine with permanent basing of aviation forces and assets at the Odesa International Airport and Uzhhorod International Airport. It was established in 1992 and has seen combat during the Russo-Ukrainian war. It utilizes both fixed wing and rotor wing aircraft for its operations.

== History ==
In 1992, the 24th separate aviation squadron of the KGB of the USSR took an oath of allegiance to the Ukraine. It was reorganized and started patrolling on the borders with Moldova, Transnistria, Belarus, and Russia. In August 1994, two additional Mi-8 helicopters were introduced into the unit. In 2003, after Territorial organization its tasks were changed to performing aviation task in the airspace of Simferopol, Odesa, Izmail, Bilhorod-Dnistrovsky, Podolsky and Mohyliv-Podilskyi border detachments. On 27 March 2008, an Mi-8T helicopter of the squadron crashed on Zmiiniy Island killing 13 of the 14 people aboard the aircraft. In November 2010, the Odesa Squadron received three DA-42NG light patrol aircraft from the Austrian Diamond Aircraft Industries, which received tactical designations "blue 21, 22, 23". On 4 July 2012, a "Diamond DA42 NG" aircraft of the squadron crashed while conducting aerial reconnaissance in the area of responsibility of the Chop Border Detachment. Its wreck was discovered near Rusky Mochar in the mountains with the bodies of three crew members. The chief of staff of the Odesa squadron Major Vitaly Mamontov, chief navigator Major Oleksandr Lysenko and an officer Kostyantyn Ogolyuk were killed in the crash.

On 8 March 2014, a “Diamond DA-42NG” of the squadron was attacked by Russian forces while conducting patrols over Armiansk. On 23 December 2015, seven Diamond patrol aircraft were transferred by the Ministry of Education and Science of Ukraine to the squadron including two DA-42NG aircraft and five DA-40TDI aircraft, previously under the operation of the Kirovohrad Flight Academy of the National Aviation University. On.24 November 2018, the Minister of Internal Affairs of Ukraine, handed over a modernized Mi-8 helicopter to the Odesa Aviation Squadron. On 17 January 2020, a modernized Mi-8MSB-V helicopter with a medical module was transferred to the squadron. In August 2021, a multi-purpose helicopter Mi-8MT was transferred to the Odesa Aviation Squadron. On 4 February 2022, the Odesa Aviation Squadron was replenished with three new Airbus H125 helicopters from France. On 27 February 2023, as part of the implementation of the intergovernmental agreement with France, the squadron received two new Airbus H125 helicopters delivered via the Slovenian airport in Ljubljana. In 2024, H125 aircraft of the squadron were partaking in direct combat against Russian UAVs.

== Inventory ==
Aircraft	Origin	Type	Notes
Fixed wing aircraft
Antonov An-24	Soviet Union	Transport aircraft	1 aircraft
Diamond DA42 Twin Star	Austria	Reconnaissance and Utility aircraft	2 aircraft
Diamond DA40 Diamond Star	Austria	Reconnaissance Light aircraft	3 aircraft
Helicopters
Mil Mi-8 T/TP/MTV and Mi-8MSB-V	Soviet Union	Military transport aircraft	3 aircraft
Airbus H125	France	Search and rescue / transport / utility	5 aircraft

== Commanders ==
- Colonel Gareev Shamil Khasanovich (1989-1997)
- Colonel Ivashin Mykolay Mykolayovych (1997-2000)
- Colonel Matsyletsky Ivan Ivanovych (2000—2004)
- Colonel Chekh Yuriy Nikolaevich (2004-2008)
- Colonel Zabrodotsky Artem Oleksandrovych (2008-)
