= Podilsk Border Detachment =

2nd Podilsk Border Detachment
- 2-й прикордонний загін
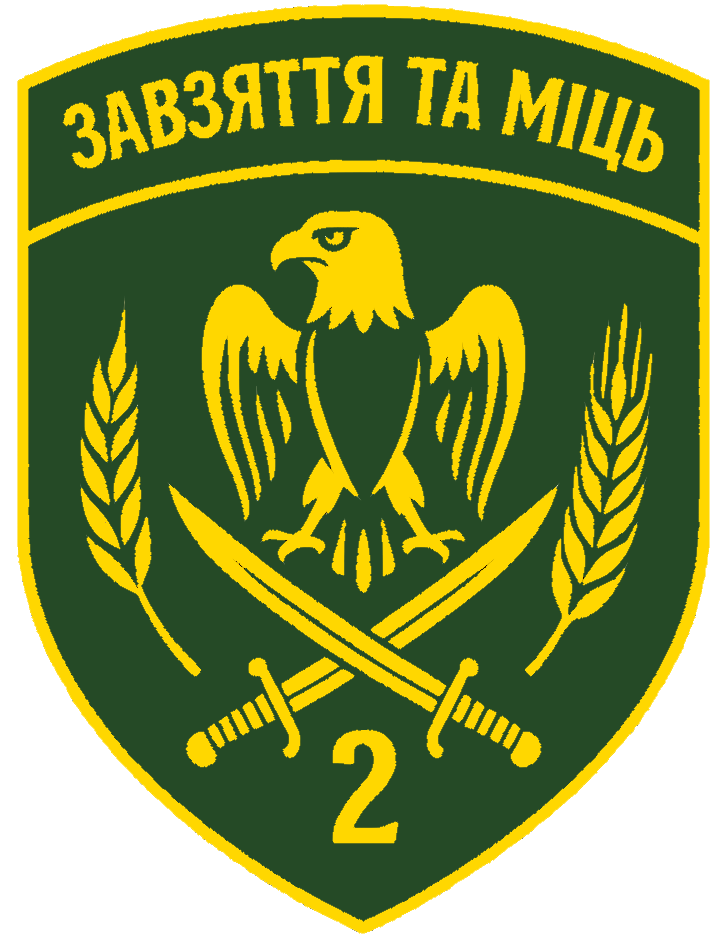
- Founded: 1992
- Country: Ukraine
- Allegiance: Ministry of Internal Affairs
- Branch: State Border Guard Service of Ukraine
- Type: Brigade
- Role: Border Guard
- Part of: State Border Guard Service of Ukraine
- Garrison/HQ: Podilsk, Odesa Oblast
- Engagements: Russo-Ukrainian war; War in Donbass; Russian invasion of Ukraine; Southern Ukraine campaign; Eastern Ukraine campaign
- Decorations: For Courage and Bravery

Commanders
- Current commander: Colonel Oleksandr Karpets

The Podilsk Border Detachment (MUN 2196) is a brigade level detachment of the Western Department of the State Border Service of Ukraine. The detachment guards the Moldova-Ukraine border and the Transnistria border in two Raions (Rozdilna Raion and Podilsk Raion) of Odesa Oblast. The detachment guards a border length of 339–360 km.

== History ==
It was established on 4 May 1992, as the Kotovsk border control detachment began on the basis of the motorized maneuver groups of the Odesa and Simferopol border detachments and started operations in June 1992. On 22 November 1997, the detachment solemnly received the Battle Flag.

In September 2016, the detachment undertook decommunization measures and was renamed to Podilsk Detachment.

In September 2023, it saw action during the Battle of Bakhmut. On 8 November 2023, the detachment detained 8 draft dodgers trying to illegally cross the border. Also in November 2023, the detachment liquidated an organization involved in human smuggling. On 26 February 2024, it detected and detained four draft dodgers trying to escape. On 17 October 2024, the detachment detained 19 people trying to illegally cross the border. In November 2024, the detachment undertook extensive training.

On 23 August 2025 the detachment was awarded the honorary award For Courage and Bravery by the President of Ukraine Volodymyr Zelenskyy.

== Structure ==
The structure of the detachment is as follows:

- Management and Headquarters
- Border Service Department "Zagnitkovo"
- Border Service Department "Kodyma"
- Border Service Department "Tymkovo"
- Border Service Department "Stanislavka"
- Border Service Department "Chorna"
- Border Service Department "Tkachenkovo"
- Border Service Department "Gulyanka"
- Border Service Department "Novosemenivka"
- Border Service Department "Pavlivka"
- Border Service Department "Velikokomarivka"
- Border Service Department "Slovyanoserbka"
- Border Service Department "Combs"
- Mobile Border Outpost "Podilsk"
- Guardian units

Following checkpoints are under the detachment's operation:

- "Olexiivka"
- "Gnatkiv"
- "Shershentsi"
- "Slobidka"
- "Tymkovo"
- "Domnytsia"
- "Kruto"
- "Stanislavka"
- "Fedosivka"
- "Platonovo"
- "Dubovo"
- "Tsekinivka"
- "Yosipivka"
- "Pavlovka"
- "Velykoploske"
- "Serbianslavska"
- "Combs"

== Commanders ==
Following are the commanders of the detachment since its establishment:

- Major General Golinko Volodymyr Vasyliovych (1992–1993)
- Colonel-General Pavlo Anatoliyovych Shisholin (1993–1995)
- Colonel Ignashichev Serhii Feodosiyovych (1995–2000)
- Colonel Oleksandr Yuriyovych Sazonov (2000–2001)
- Colonel Rezniuk Arkadiy Vasyliovych (2001–2002)
- Colonel Kurnikov Valeriy Valeriyovych (2002–2004)
- Colonel Andriy Petrovych Tyshkevich (2004–2005)
- Colonel Babiuk Viktor Borisovych (2005–2008)
- Colonel Andrii Volodymyrovych Lukin (2008–2009)
- Colonel Andriy Mykolayovych Valchuk (2009–2011)
- Lieutenant Colonel Andrii Mykhailovych Ignatiev (2011–2014)
- Colonel Ihor Anatoliyovych Pidhorodetskyi (2014–2020)
- Colonel Savchuk Andriy Ihorovych (2020–2022)
- Colonel Chichanovskyi Oleg Volodymyrovych (2022-)
