= Valeriy Vavrynyuk =

Ukrainian military officer (born 1975)

- Валерій Вавринюк
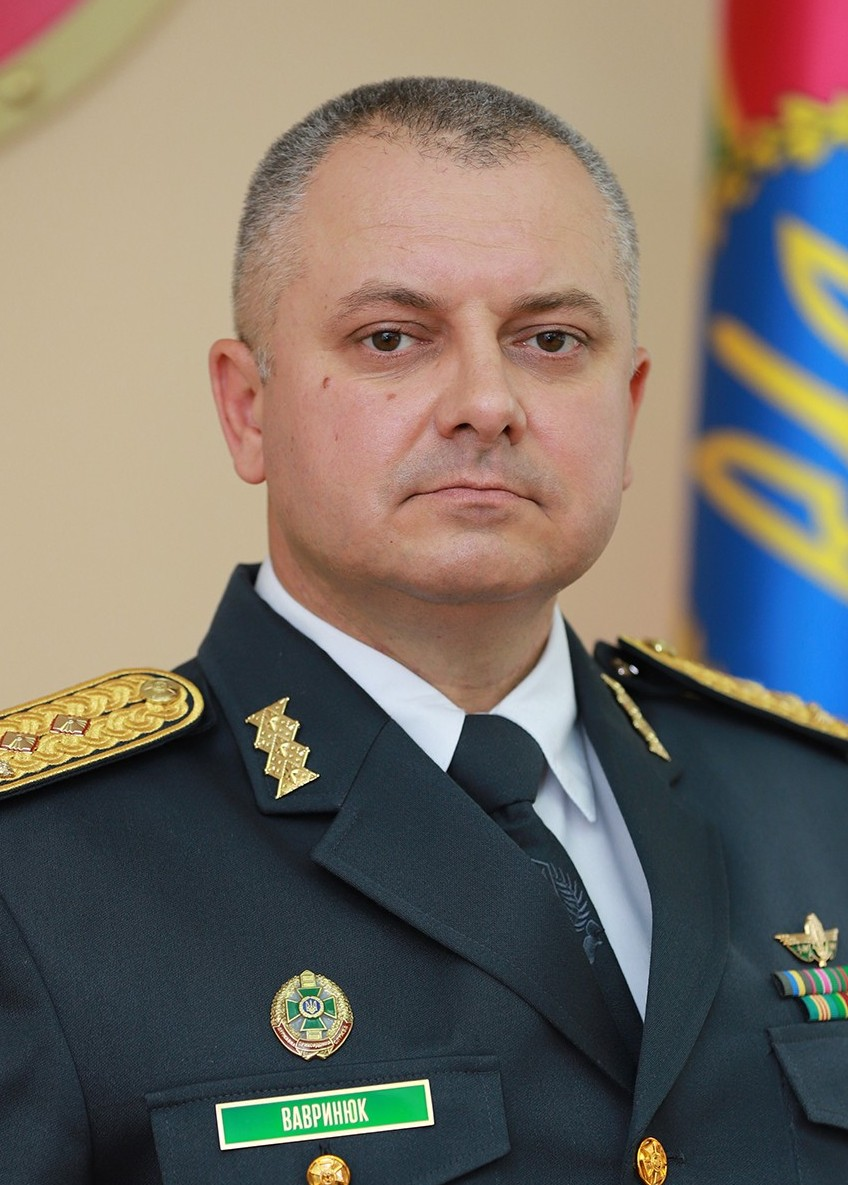

Acting Head of the State Border Service of Ukraine
- Incumbent
- Assumed office 4 January 2026
- President: Volodymyr Zelenskyy
- Preceded by: Serhii Deineko

First Deputy Head of the State Administration of Ukraine
- In office 20 October 2025 – 4 January 2026
- Succeeded by: Serhiy Kyslytsia

Personal details
- Born: Valeriy Pavlovych Vavrynyuk; July 14, 1975 (age 51) Khmelnytskyi, Ukrainian SSR, Soviet Union

Military service
- Battles/wars: Russian-Ukrainian war

Valeriy Pavlovych Vavrynyuk (Ukrainian: Валерій Павлович Вавринюк, born 14 July 1975) is a Ukrainian politician and soldier who currently serves as the Acting Head of the State Border Service of Ukraine since 4 January 2026. He was appointed by President Volodymyr Zelenskyy. He previously served as the First Deputy Head of the State Administration of Ukraine from October 2025 to January 2026.

== Life ==
Valeriy Pavlovych Vavrynyuk was born on 14 July 1975 in Khmelnytskyi. He graduated from the Bohdan Khmelnytskyi Academy of the Border Troops of Ukraine in 1996. From 1996 to 2001, he served in the Bohdan Khmelnytskyi Academy of Border Troops. He completed Bohdan Khmelnytskyi National Academy of the Border Troops of Ukraine in 2003.

== Career ==
Valeriy was appointed as the First Deputy Head of the State Administration of Ukraine from October 2025 until in January 2026, where he was appointed as the Acting Head of the State Border Service of Ukraine by the President Volodymyr Zelenskyy.
