= 10th Mobile Border Detachment =

Unit of the State Border Guard Service of Ukraine

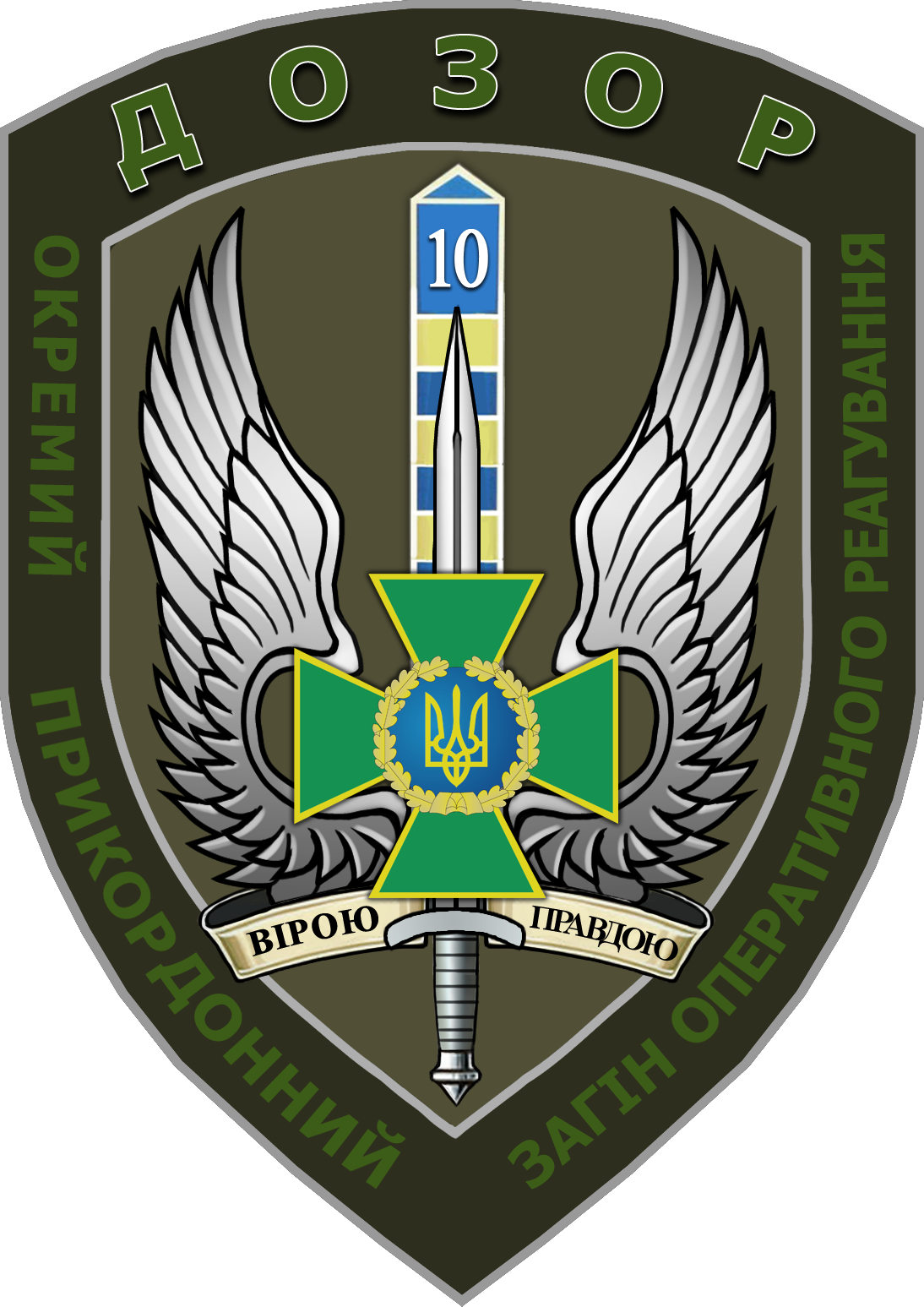
- Active: 2002–present
- Allegiance: Ukraine
- Branch: SBGS
- Garrison/HQ: Kyiv
- Mottos: Faith and Truth!
- Engagements: Russo-Ukrainian War; War in Donbas; Russian invasion of Ukraine; 2023 Ukrainian counteroffensive
- Decorations: For Courage and Bravery

Commanders
- Current commander: Colonel Maksym Balagura

The 10th Mobile Border Detachment, also known as the 10th Separate Operational Response Detachment, DOZOR (Ukrainian: abbr. ДОЗОР (Note: Десятий окремий загін оперативного реагування), lit. 'WATCH'; MUN 1496) is a state border protection body that directly fulfills the tasks assigned to the State Border Service to ensure the inviolability of the state border of Ukraine on the sections of the state border determined by the decision of the State Border Service Administration. DOZOR's mandate includes providing security for Government officials such as the President of Ukraine and other senior officials, engaging in counterterrorism activities, and human trafficking. The unit also participates in special operations and surveillance missions to gather intelligence and assess threats. The commander is Colonel Maksym Vileninovych Balagura.

== History ==
The 10th Mobile Border Detachment, or D.O.Z.O.R. was founded in 2002 and tasked with providing clandestine missions along the 7,000 miles of Ukrainian borders.

In mid-April 2018, to ensure the fulfillment of tasks in various regions, the deployment of the special operations department "DOZOR" with locations in Kharkiv, Zhytomyr, Lviv, Kherson, and Odesa began. In May 2018, it is planned to start a new course of selection for the ranks of the detachment. DOZOR is an abbreviation for the 10th separate regimen of rapid response.

By the end of the year, it is planned to have about 1,000 border special forces personnel and increase efforts to create maritime special forces, which is about 270 people who will serve in Dozor-M units in the waters of the Azov and Black seas.

In May 2019, with the assistance of the US Embassy, two safe boats, which can be used for patrol and raid-assault purposes, were transferred to the border agency. Modern boats will be used by the 10th Separate Operational Response unit (D.O.Z.O.R.) for operational and service purposes. The crew of the boat is four sailors. However, it is possible to accommodate up to 20 airborne troops with equipment.

In September 2019, the unit took part in international competitions in Lithuania. According to his results, he took second place.

Since 24 February 2022, the detachment has been actively contesting the Russian invasion of Ukraine. IN 2022 D.O.Z.O.R. fought n Kyiv and Chernihiv regions. THE 10th Mobile Border Detachment took part in the counteroffensive in Kharkiv region ABD operated in the Zaporizhzhia direction. By the end of 2022 D.O.Z.O.R. participated in the defense of Bakhmut. More details about the entire success of the unit will be described after the victory in the war since this information is currently classified.

It took part in the 2023 Ukrainian counteroffensive during which a personnel of the detachment (Serhii Volodymyrovych Kirylenko) was killed on 6 July 2023 in Zaporizhzhia Oblast and was posthumously awarded the Hero of Ukraine.

On 30 April 2023, the 10th Mobile Border Detachment was awarded the "For Courage and Bravery" by the decree of the President Volodymyr Zelenskyy.

In May 2023, the detachment in coordination with Chernivtsi Border Detachment detained three people trying to illegally cross the Ukraine-Romania border along with their smuggler and two vehicles used by them were seized.

In January 2025 DOZOR took place in raids into the Kursk Oblast in Russia. The unit reportedly provided reconnaissance near Malaya Loknya.

In October 2025 the 10th Mobile Border Detachment eliminated a unit from Russia’s Senezh Special Operations Center in the Sumy region. Senezh had been operating in Kharkiv, Sumy, and Chernihiv. They conducted raids against civilians and Ukrainian troops. D.O.Z.O.R ambushed the unit and captured equipment.

== Structure ==
Management:

- Command;
- Service of regime and protection of information;
- Headquarters;
- Operative and investigative department.

Main subdivisions:

- 1st department
- 2nd department
- 3rd department
- 4th department
- canine department;
- department of special equipment.

Support units:

- material and technical support group.
- Regional departments.

== Task ==
The special tasks of the detachment include:

- carrying out local, (spot) actions in directions determined by the decision of the Administration of the State Border Service and directing the actions of subordinate units;
- participation in activities related to the organization of protection of places of permanent and temporary stay of the President of Ukraine and other officials, defined in the Law of Ukraine "On State Protection of State Authorities of Ukraine and Officials";
- Anti-terrorist activity
- Combating illegal migration, slave trade, illegal drug trafficking
- Special operations
- Conducting special intelligence
- ensuring the safety of senior officials
- Conducting training events for the line units of the State Security Service
- Anti-sabotage activity
- Operational activity

== Commanders ==
- Colonel Vadim Hryhorovych Sobko
- Colonel Maksym Vileninovych Balagura

== Armament ==
- UAR-15 rifle, a variant of the Zbroyar Z-15.
