= Kharkiv Border Aviation Squadron =

26th Kharkiv Aviation Squadron
- 26-та окрема авіаційна ескадрилья (Ukrainian)
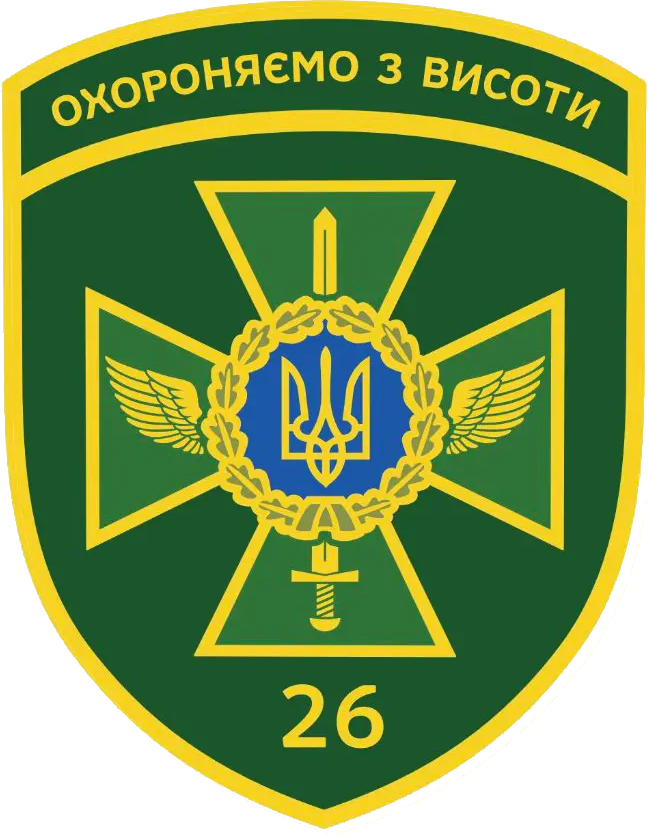
- Squadron Insignia
- Founded: 1993
- Country: Ukraine
- Allegiance: Ministry of Internal Affairs
- Branch: State Border Guard Service of Ukraine
- Type: Brigade
- Role: Air Border Guard
- Part of: State Border Guard Service of Ukraine
- Garrison/HQ: Kharkiv
- Engagements: Russo-Ukrainian war: War in Donbass; Battle of the Border; Russian invasion of Ukraine; Eastern Ukraine campaign

Commanders
- Current commander: Colonel Dmytro Volodymyrovych Khalyavka

The 26th Separate Kharkiv Aviation Squadron (MUN 1467) is an aviation squadron of the State Border Guard Service of Ukraine with permanent basing of aviation forces and assets at the Kharkiv International Airport and Kyiv International Airport. It was established in 1993 as has seen combat during the Russo-Ukrainian war. It utilizes both fixed wing and rotor wing aircraft for its operations.

== History ==
On 31 May 1993, the 26th separate aviation squadron was established with permanent deployment at Kharkiv. On 27 March, an Mi-8T helicopter (aircraft number 07) of the Odessa squadron crashed on Zmiiny Island and all border guard aviation operations of the Kharkiv squadron were stopped for two months. In late 2000s, the squadron started two annual survival exercises aimed at increasing survival expertise of the aviation personnel in the case of an aviation incident. On 28 March 2011, the squadron's personnel started training on DA40 and DA42MPP NG aircraft purchased from the Austrian company Diamond Aircraft Industries. In total, three such aircraft, a ground surveillance station and an airfield complex were added to the squadron. The aircraft were equipped with an on-board complex that includes a multifunctional platform with a gyro-stabilized camera with real-time image transmission.

In 2014, with the start of the War in Donbass, helicopters of the squadron evacuated about 150 wounded servicemen of the State Border Guard Service of Ukraine and the Armed Forces of Ukraine from the frontlines of the ATO zone and also took a direct evacuation and support role during the Battle of the Border. On 31 May 2018, the 26th Separate Aviation Squadron celebrated its 25th anniversary. In January 2022, the squadron received two Airbus H125 aircraft. In 2024, H125 aircraft of the squadron were partaking in direct combat against Russian UAVs.

== Commanders ==
- Colonel Manmar Yuriy Alekseevich (1993-?)
- Colonel Vernydub Mykola Vyacheslavovich (?-?)
- Colonel Khilkovsky Oleg Vitalyevich (?-2010)
- Colonel Dmytro Volodymyrovych Khalyavka (2011-)

== Inventory ==
Aircraft	Origin	Type	Notes
Fixed Wing Aircraft
Diamond DA42 Twin Star	Austria	Reconnaissance and Utility aircraft	
Diamond DA40 Diamond Star	Austria	Reconnaissance Light aircraft	
Helicopters
Mil Mi-8	Soviet Union	Military transport aircraft	
Robinson R66	United States	Utility aircraft	
Airbus H125	France	Search and rescue / transport / utility	
