= State Border Guard Service of Ukraine =

Law enforcement agency in Ukraine

State Border Guard Service of Ukraine Державна прикордонна служба України
- Service emblem

- Service flag
- Abbreviation: SBGSU / ДПСУ

Agency overview
- Formed: July 31, 2003
- Preceding agency: State Committee for Protection of the State Border of Ukraine
- Employees: ~ 60 000 (2022)

Jurisdictional structure
- National agency: Ukraine
- Operations jurisdiction: Ukraine
- General nature: Gendarmerie
- Specialist jurisdiction: National border patrol, security, integrity

Operational structure
- Headquarters: 26, Volodymyrska st, Kyiv
- Agency executive: Valeriy Vavrynyuk, Head of the SBGSU
- Parent agency: Ministry of Internal Affairs
- Child agency: Ukrainian Sea Guard

Notables
- Significant operations: 2003 Tuzla Island conflict; Siege of the Luhansk Border Base; Snake Island campaign

Website
- dpsu.gov.ua

The State Border Guard Service of Ukraine (abbr. SBGSU; Ukrainian: Державна Прикордонна Служба України, romanized: Derzhavna Prykordonna Sluzhba Ukrainy, pronounced [derˈʒɑu̯nɐ prɪkorˈdɔnːɐ ˈsluʒbɐ ʊkrɐˈjinɪ]; abbr. ДПСУ, DPSU) is the border guard of Ukraine. It is an independent law enforcement agency, organized by the Constitution of Ukraine as a military formation, the head of which is subordinated to the President of Ukraine.

The Service was created on July 31, 2003, after the reorganization of the State Committee for Protection of the State Border. During wartime, units of the State Border Guard Service fall under the command of the Armed Forces of Ukraine. The State Border Guard Service includes the Ukrainian Sea Guard, which is the country's coast guard. It is also responsible for running Temporary Detention Centres, in which refugees are held.

== History ==
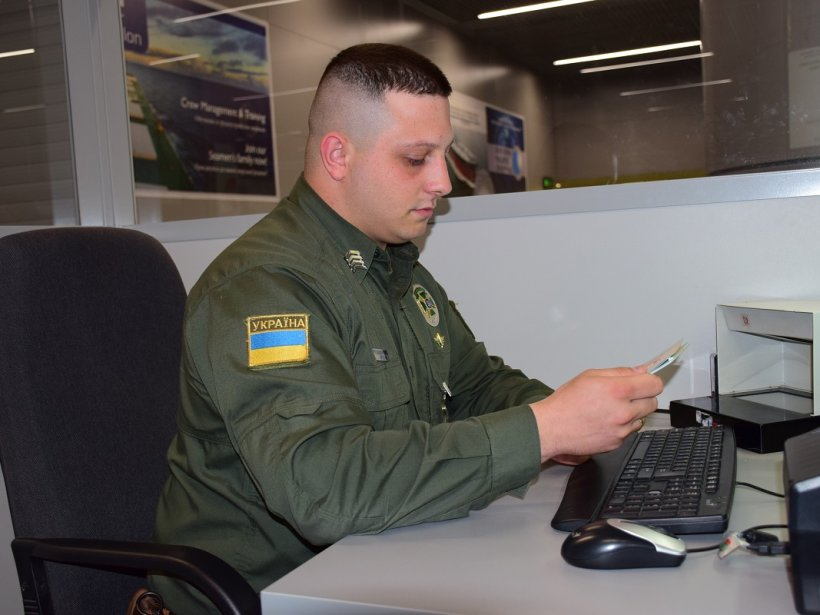
Ukrainian border guard officer checking documents at the Kharkiv International Airport

Ukrainian border guards are the national successors of the Soviet Border Troops. They were formed from the approximately 17,000 Border Troops located in Ukraine in 1991. The organization was first titled the "Ukrainian Border Troops", which was later subordinated to the "Ukraine's State Committee for State Border Guarding".

From 1991 to at least 1993, the new borders with Russia and Belarus were not guarded; the Border Troops were only deployed along the western borders (minus Moldova) and on the Black Sea. Another 9,000 personnel were added to the Border Troops at the expense of the Armed Forces of Ukraine, and, by the end of 1993, border posts were established in the north along the Russian and Belarusian borders. In 1999, the authorized strength of the force was again increased to 50,000.

In 2003, new legislation was adopted, and this somewhat changed the legal status of the institution. In March 2003, the Border Troops became the State Border Guard Service of Ukraine, and its status was legally changed from 'military formation' to 'special law-enforcement body.' The force was legally granted 50,000 personnel, including 8,000 civilian employees.

On 4 July 2012, a State Border Guard Service Diamond DA42 aircraft failed to make its scheduled radio contact with ground units. A Search and rescue mission revealed that the plane had crashed into a wooded mountainous area in Velykyi Bereznyi Raion, killing all 3 crew members on board. A further investigation was launched.

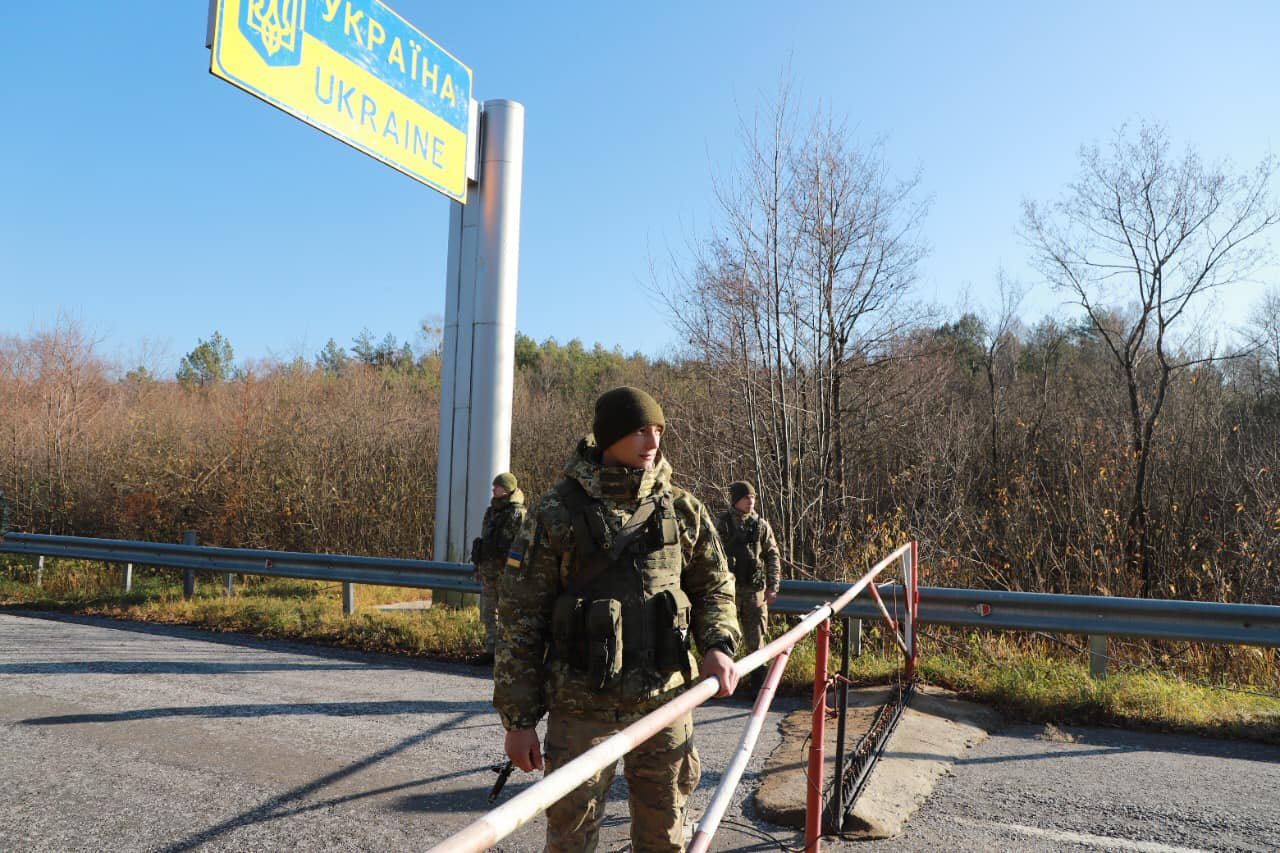
Border Guards at the Belarus–Ukraine border, 2021.

During The War in Donbas on August 31, 2014, two Sea Guard Zhuk class patrol boats were struck by land-based artillery. In June 2, a border base in the outskirts of Luhansk was besieged by a troop of Luhansk People's Republic separatists. The Siege of the Luhansk Border Base resulted in 10 wounded Border Guards until they surrendered and withdrew.

In 2020, the UAR-15 was adopted for use by the SBGSU for their special forces units.

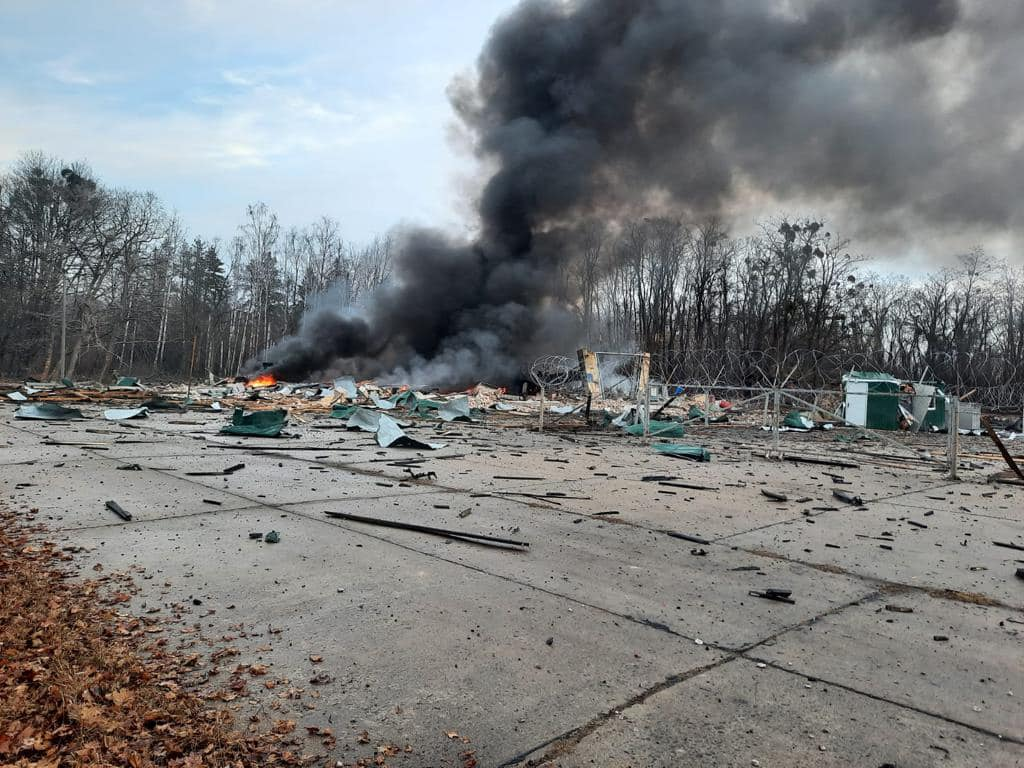
Ukrainian Border Guard post in Kyiv Oblast shelled by Russian missiles in the first day of the Russian invasion of Ukraine, 24 February 2022

In 2022, during the Battle of Snake Island 13 border troops were attacked and captured by Russian warships. A unit of border guards was stationed in Mariupol and fought during the Siege of Mariupol. In 20 April, the border guards were stranded in an encircled pocket at the Mariupol sea port together with National Police of Ukraine, until they were rescued by the Azov Regiment and retreated into the Azovstal Iron and Steel Works.

On 30 April 2024, Andriy Demchenko, spokesperson of the State Border Guard Service of Ukraine, said in an interview that 30 Ukrainians have died trying to leave since February 2024 when conscription was introduced. Since the implementation of martial law some 450 criminal gangs have been formed specialising in people smuggling.

In April 2024, was announced the creation of the third combat brigade in the State Border Guard Service. The brigade was named Hart and Colonel Volodymyr Chervonenko became its commander.

=== Involvement in abuse and murders of Ukrainian men fleeing the country ===
During the Russia-Ukraine war and war-related country exit ban for males, the Guard Service has been responsible for enforcing this ban by policing the border for conscription age men seeking to leave Ukraine through clandestine routes. There have been reports of captured individuals being beaten and tortured with several cases of shootings of fugitives to death also being reported, leading to the arrest of the guards responsible by the State Bureau of Investigation (Ukraine).

== Structure ==
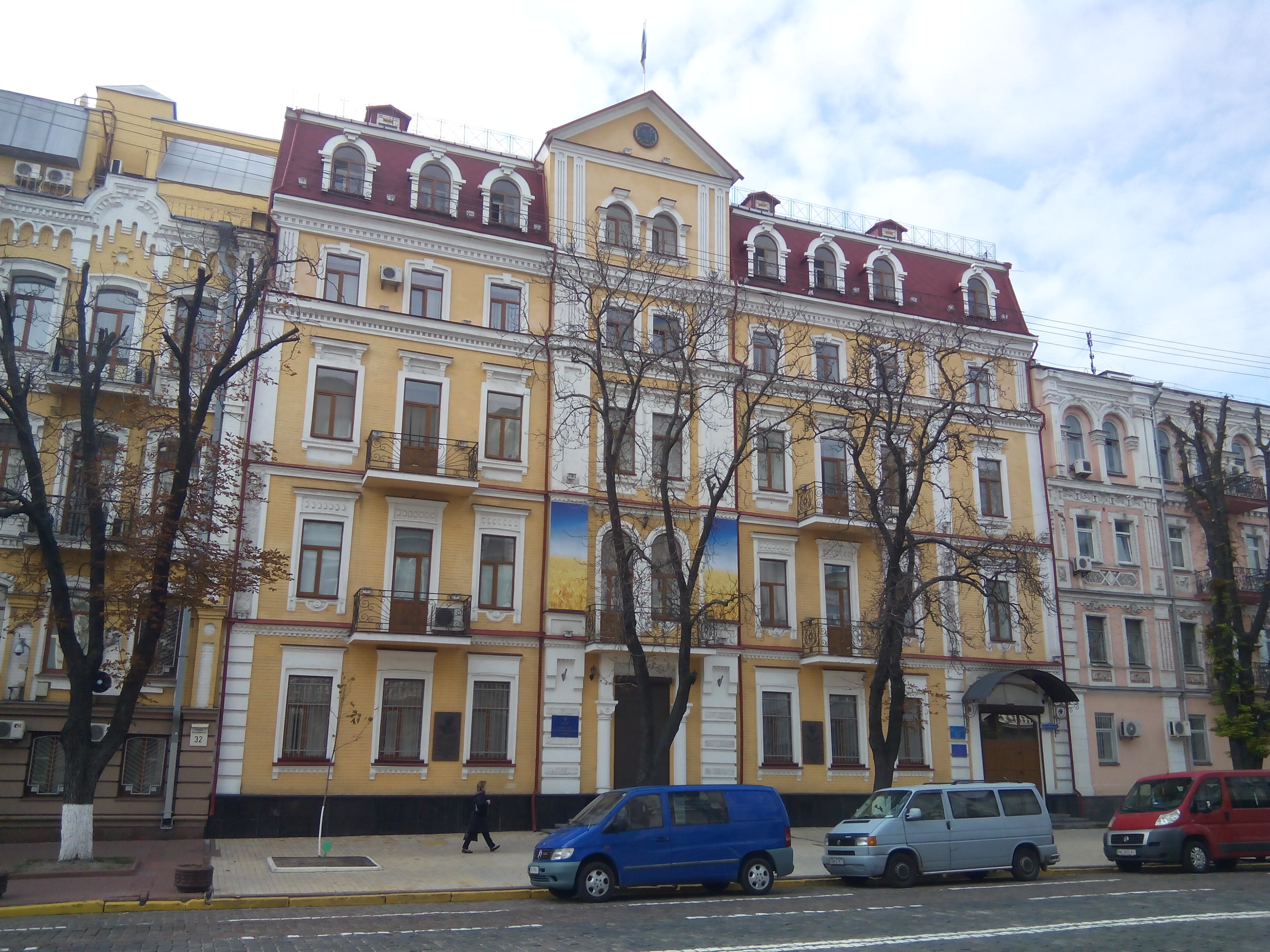
The State Border Guard Service's headquarters in Kyiv

State Border Guard Service of Ukraine is a special enforcement branch tasked with the protection of Ukrainian state border on land, sea or any other inland water obstacle. During wartime, the Border Guards units fall under the command of the Armed Forces of Ukraine. They were the first Ukrainian units to counter Russian invasion on February 24, 2022.

=== Mobile response units ===
- Dozor Detachment
- Pomsta Brigade (former Luhansk Detachment)
- Phoenix Regiment
- Stalevy Kordon Infantry Brigade
- Hart Brigade (former Donetsk Detachment)
- Forpost Brigade (former Kramatorsk Detachment)

=== Border detachments ===
- Berdyansk Detachment
- Bilhorod-Dnistrovskyi Detachment
- Chernihiv Detachment
- Chernivtsi Detachment
- Chop Detachment
- Izmail Detachment
- Kharkiv Detachment
- Kherson Detachment
- Lutsk Detachment
- Lviv Detachment
- Mohyliv-Podilskyi Detachment
- Mukachevo Detachment
- Odesa Detachment
- Podilsk Detachment
- Shostka Detachment
- Sumy Detachment
- Zhytomyr Detachment

=== Maritime Security ===
- Izmail Sea Guard Unit
- Mariupol Sea Guard Unit
- Odesa Sea Guard Unit

=== Aviation ===
- Lviv Aviation Squadron
- Kharkiv Aviation Squadron
- Odesa Aviation Squadron

=== Volunteer Units ===
- Cossack Regiment Shevchenko
- Special Purpose Battalion Sever

== Commanders ==
Directors (commanders) of the Border Guard Service (border troops):

- 1991–1994: Valeriy Hubenko
- 1994–1999: Viktor Bannykh
- 1999–2001: Borys Oleksiyenko
- 2001–2014: Mykola Lytvyn
- 2014–2017: Viktor Nazarenko
- 2017–2019: Petro Tsyhykal
- 2019–2026: Serhii Deineko
- 2026–present: Valeriy Vavrynyuk

== Military ranks ==
=== Uniform ===
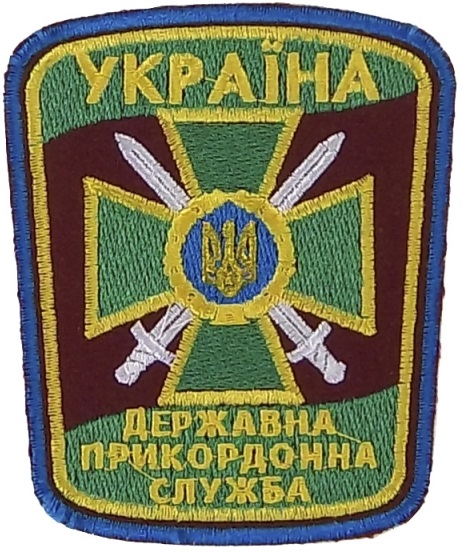
Patch

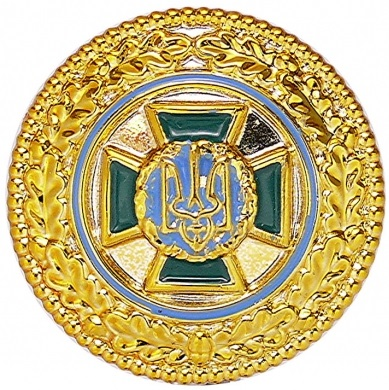
Cockade

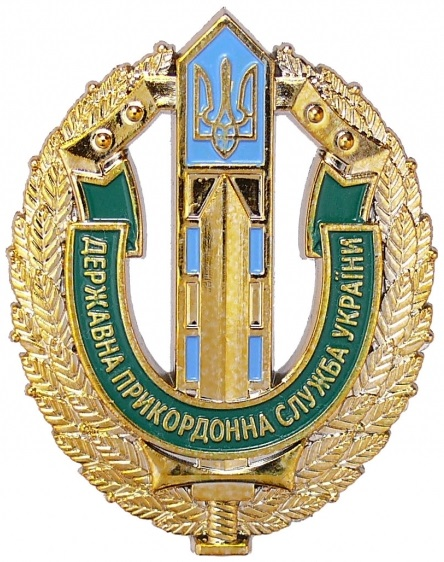
Officers cocarde

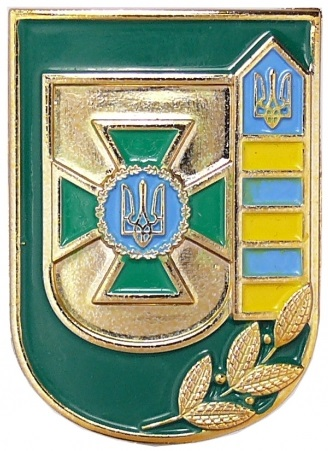
Privates cocarde

=== Long service medal ===
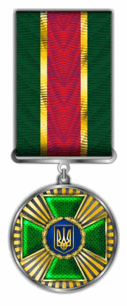
25 years in service

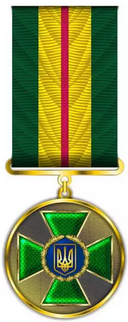
20 years in service

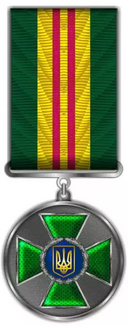
15 years in service

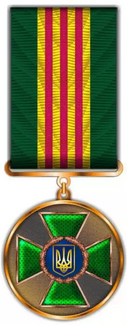
10 years in service

== Equipment ==
Model	Image	Origin	Variant	Number	Details
Anti-tank
Stugna-P		Ukraine			
NLAW		Sweden; United Kingdom		Several hundred	Used by the Luhansk border guards.
SPG-9		Soviet Union; Bulgaria	SPG-9M; ATGL-H		Bulgarian made rifles are also used.
Artillery
DITA		Czech Republic			First shown by the SBGS in January 2025
BS-3		Soviet Union			Reactivated after the 2022 Russian invasion.
RAK-12		Croatia	RAK-SA-12		
ZU-23-2		Soviet Union; Poland	ZU-23-2CP		Used on static positions or mounted on trucks.
Armoured personnel carrier
BM Triton		Ukraine		63	Only two examples delivered before the 2022 invasion.
Roshel Senator		Canada			Used by the Chernihiv border guards.
M113		United States		50	Purchased by the Ukrainian Ministry of Energy and energy sector companies.
MRAP
Kozak		Ukraine	Kozak-2	17	
KrAZ Cougar		Canada; Ukraine		3+	
Alvis 4		South Africa; United Kingdom		7	Donated by Estonia.
Logistics and utility vehicles
Ural-4320		Soviet Union	Medium truck		
ZiL-131		Soviet Union	Medium truck		
GAZ-66		Soviet Union	Medium truck (2 tonnes)		
KamAZ-5320		Soviet Union	Heavy truck (8 tonnes)		
KamAZ-4310		Soviet Union	Heavy truck (6 tonnes)		
KAMAZ-43114		Russia	Heavy truck (6 tonnes)		Purchased prior to the Russo-Ukrainian war.
KrAZ-257		Soviet Union	Heavy truck (12 tonnes)		
KrAZ-255B		Soviet Union	Heavy truck (12 tonnes)		
KrAZ-260		Soviet Union	Heavy truck		
KrAZ-6322		Ukraine	Heavy truck		
KrAZ-6510		Ukraine	Dump truck		
KrAZ-5233		Ukraine	Heavy truck (6 tonnes)		
IVECO Trakker		Italy	Dump truck		Donated by Germany.
Mercedes Benz Unimog		Germany	Truck		Donated by Germany.
UAZ-3163		Russia	Off-road vehicle		
Land Rover Defender		UK	Off-road vehicle	55	
Volkswagen Amarok		Germany	Off-road vehicle	20	
Toyota Land Cruiser 200		Japan	Off-road vehicle	20	
Dacia Duster		France; Romania	Off-road vehicle	10	
UAZ-3303		Russia	Off-road vehicle		
Mitsubishi L200		Japan	Off-road vehicle	40	Donated by the US in 2021.
UAZ-3962		Russia			
Volkswagen Transporter		Germany	Bus	10	
Ford Transit		USA	Bus	10	
Bogdan A092		Ukraine	Bus		
ЛАЗ-695		USSR	Bus		
Rosenbauer Panther		Austria	Airport crash tender	2	Donated by Germany.
Other vehicles
Bombardier Outlander 400 MAX		Canada		100	
Polaris 600 IQ Touring		Canada		50	
Caterpillar 336-08		United States		1	Donated by Germany.
Aircraft
Antonov An-8		Soviet Union			Used by the Sea Guard.
Antonov An-24		Soviet Union			Used by the Sea Guard.
Antonov An-26		Soviet Union			Used by the Sea Guard.
Antonov An-72		Soviet Union			Used by the Sea Guard.

== Gallery ==
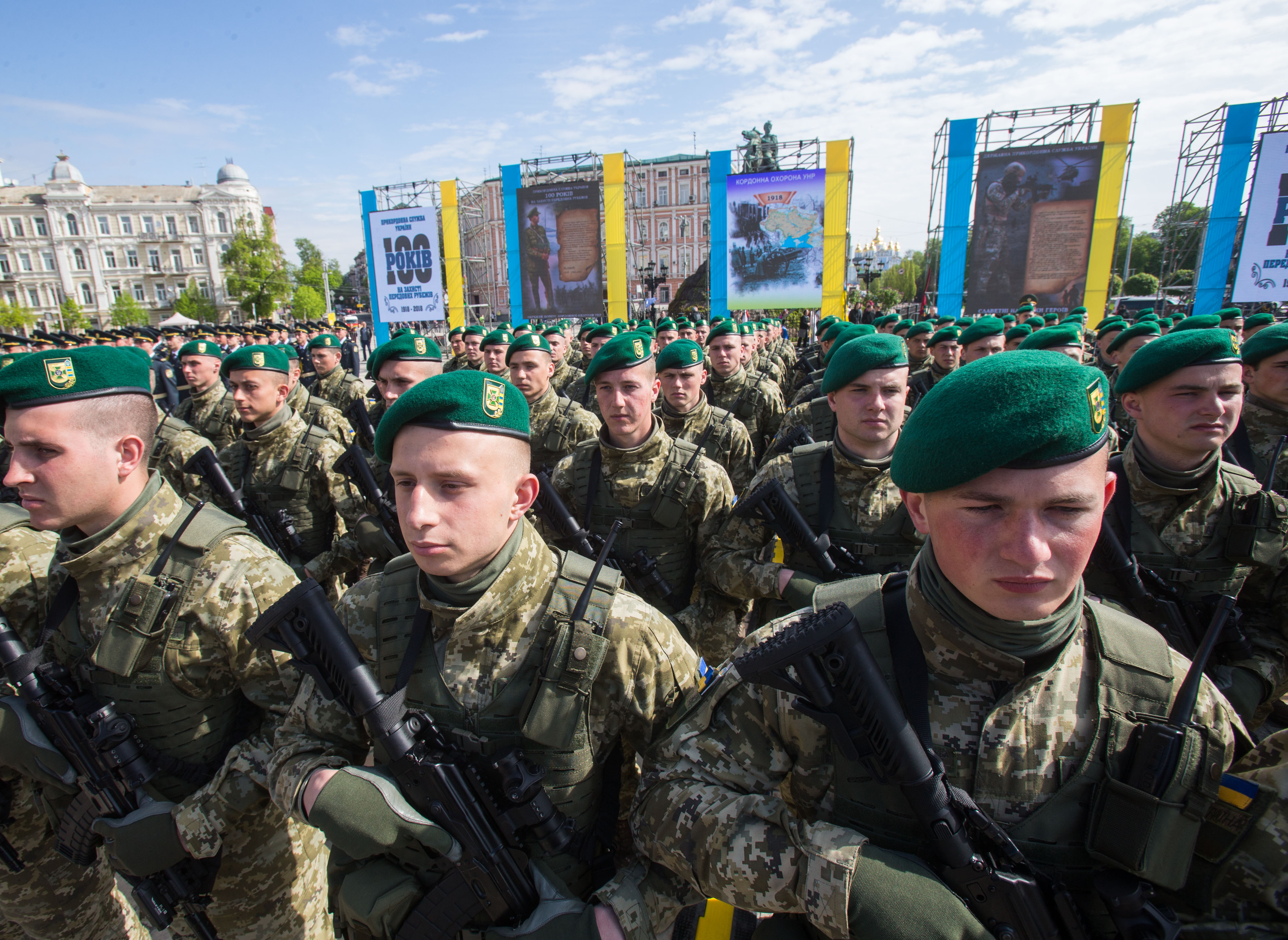
Ukrainian Border Guards in a parade, 2018

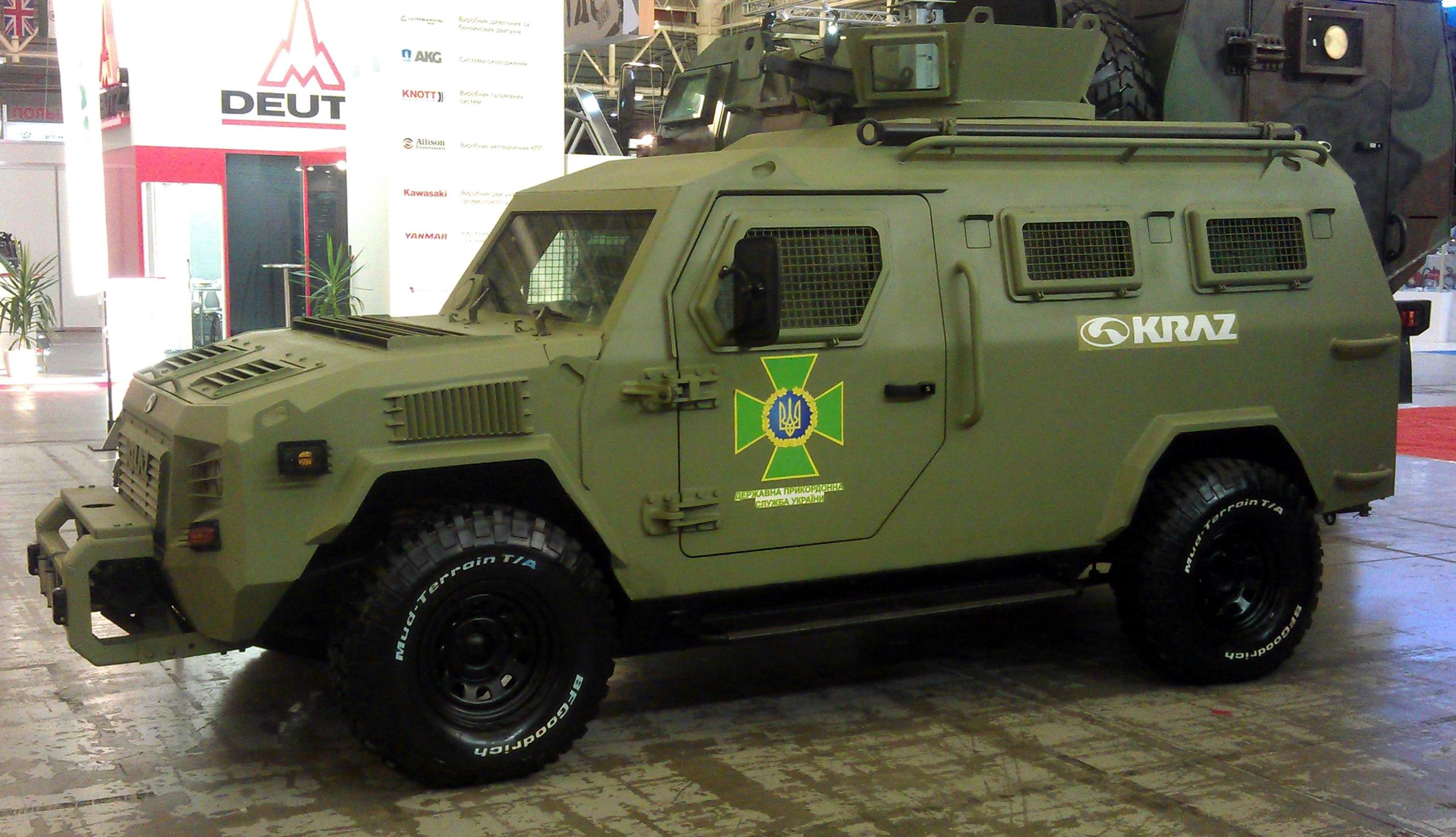
KrAZ Cobra of the Border Guard

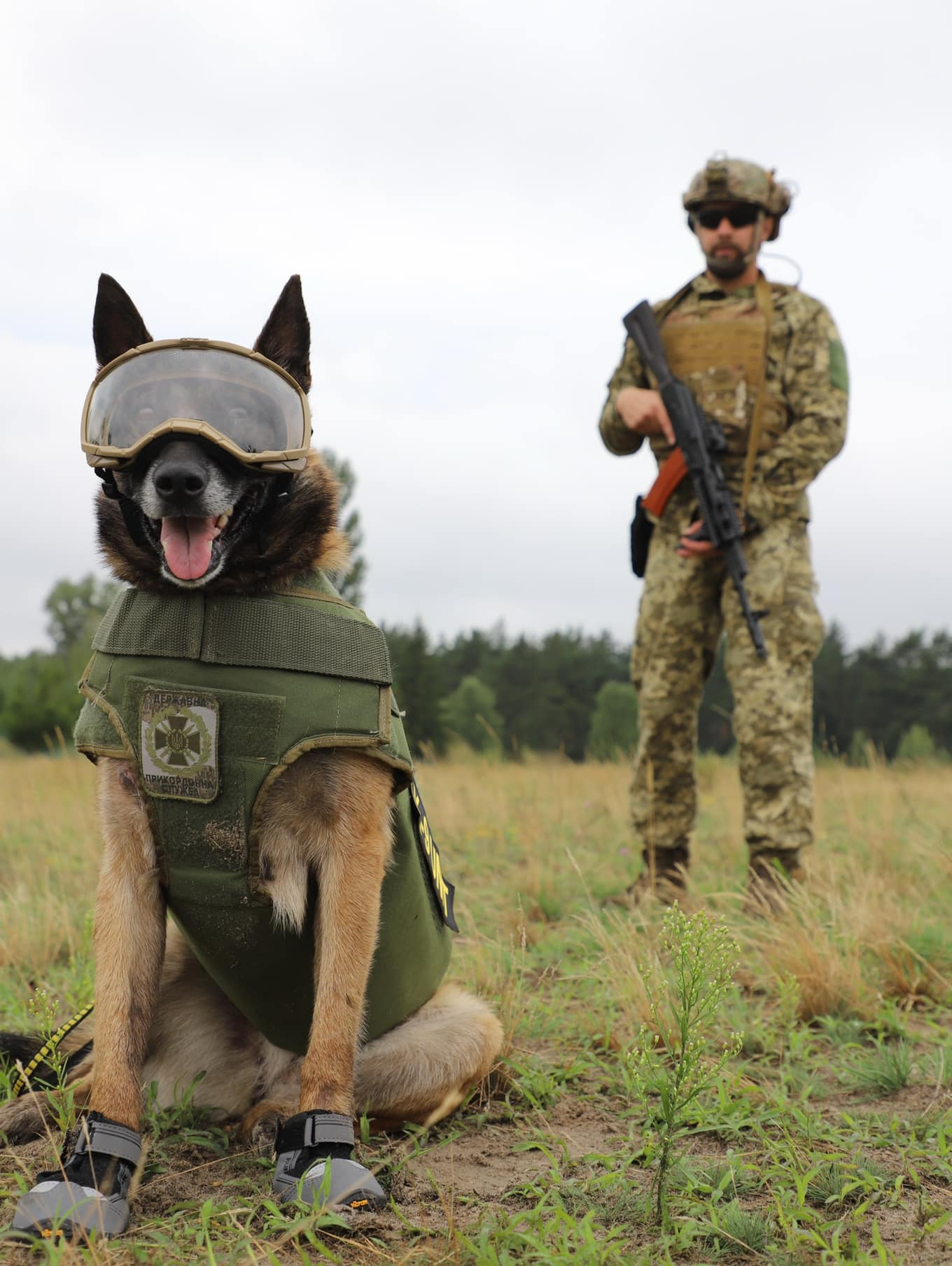
K-9 service dog and his handler

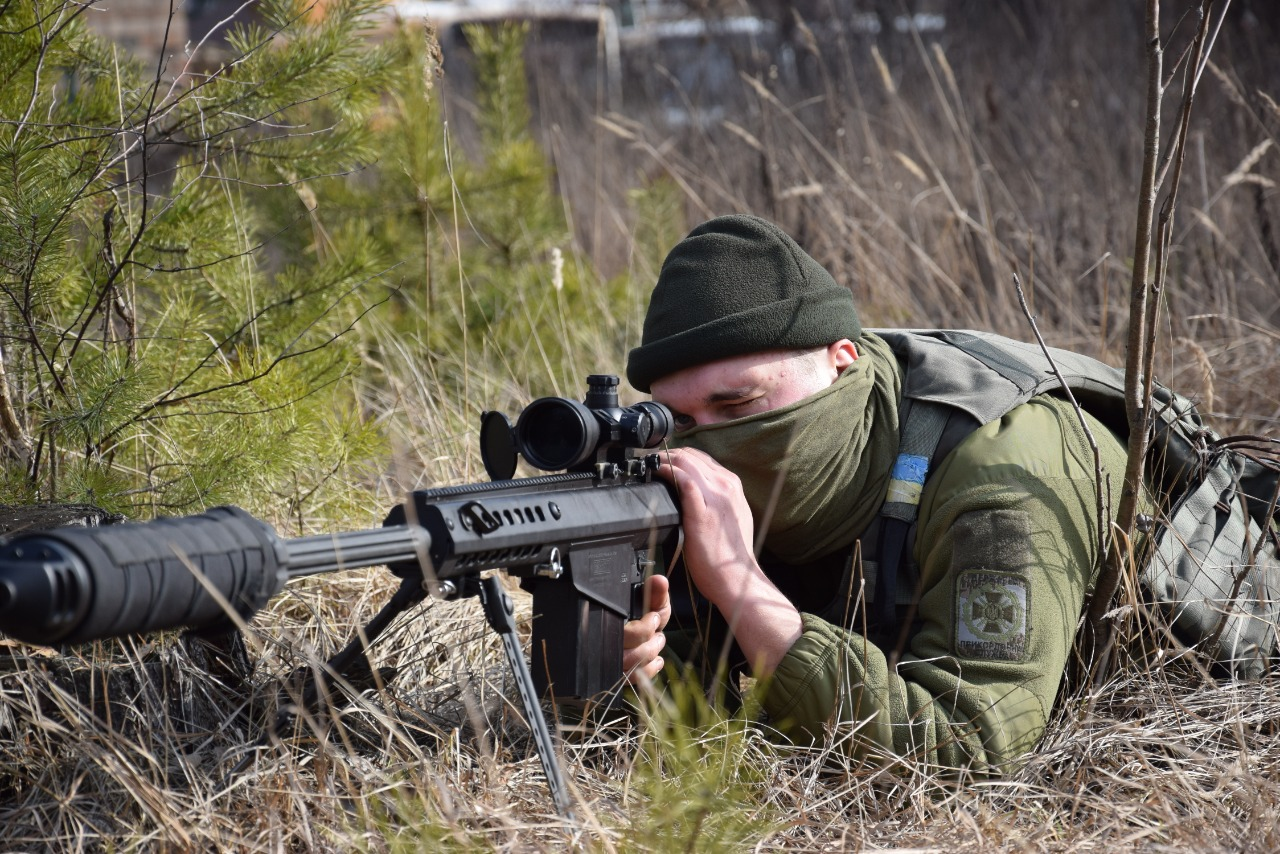
Border guard with Barrett M82 sniper rifle during the Russo-Ukrainian war

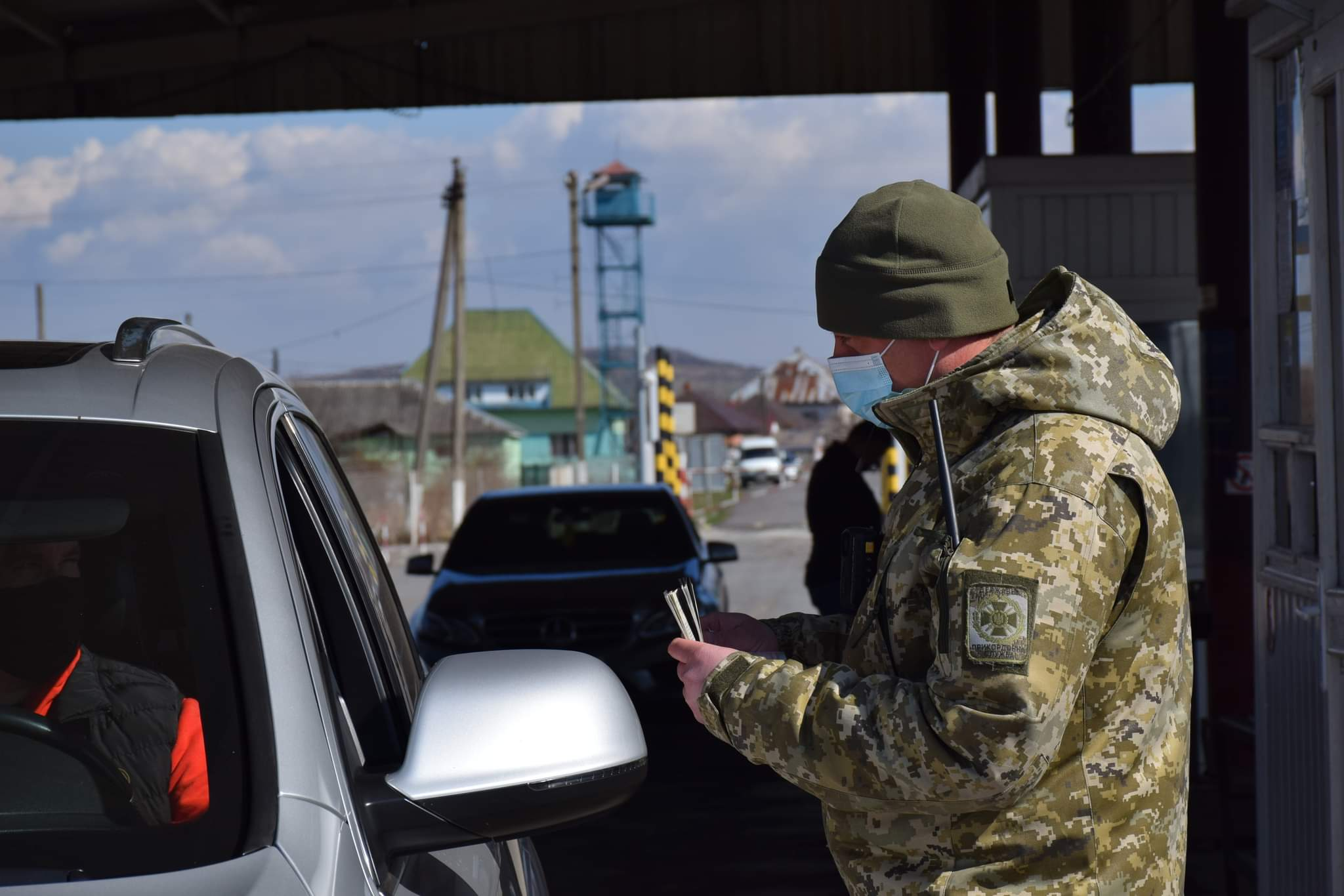
Ukrainian border guard checks documents at the border with Hungary

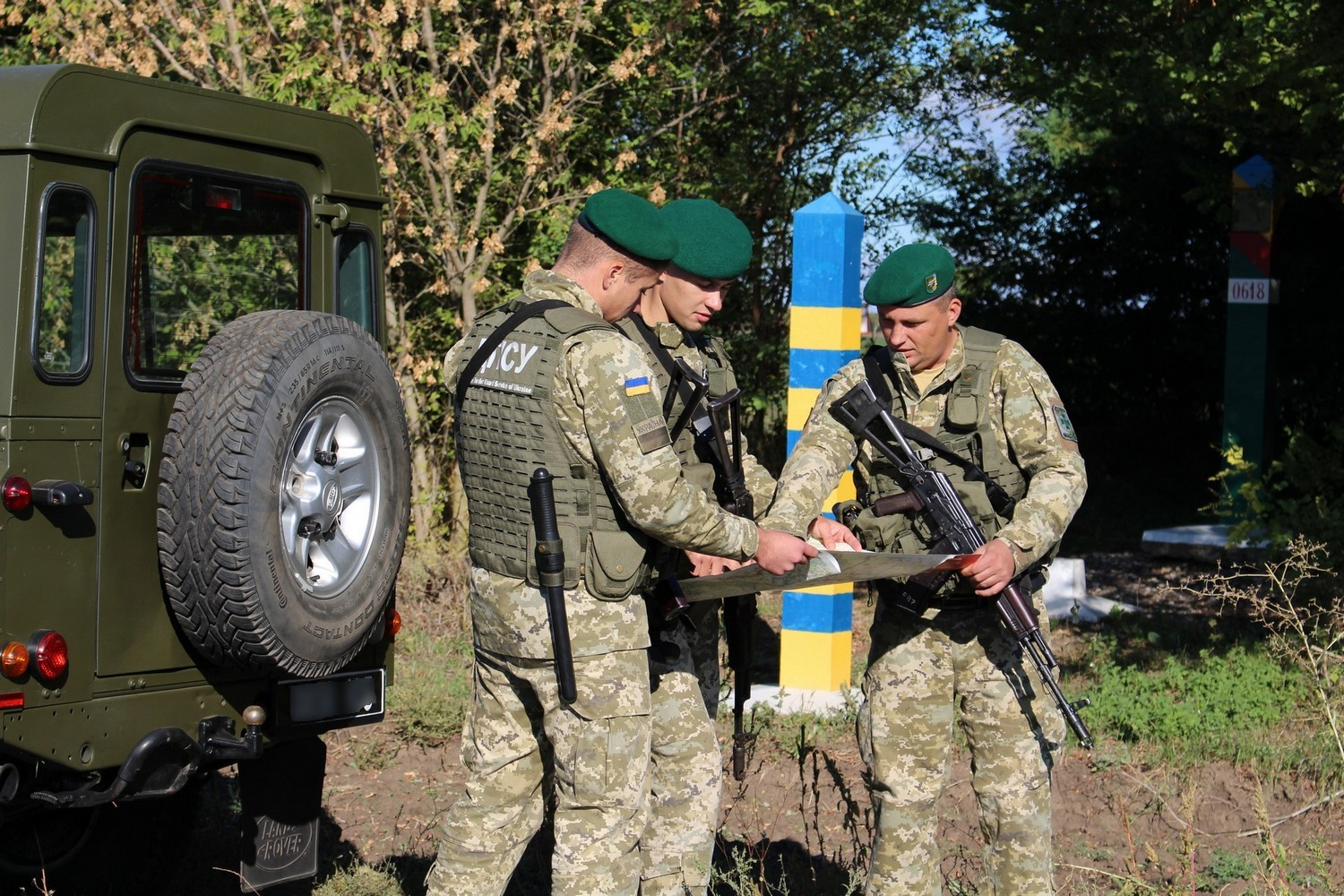
Ukrainian border guard field operatives patrolling the border with Moldova

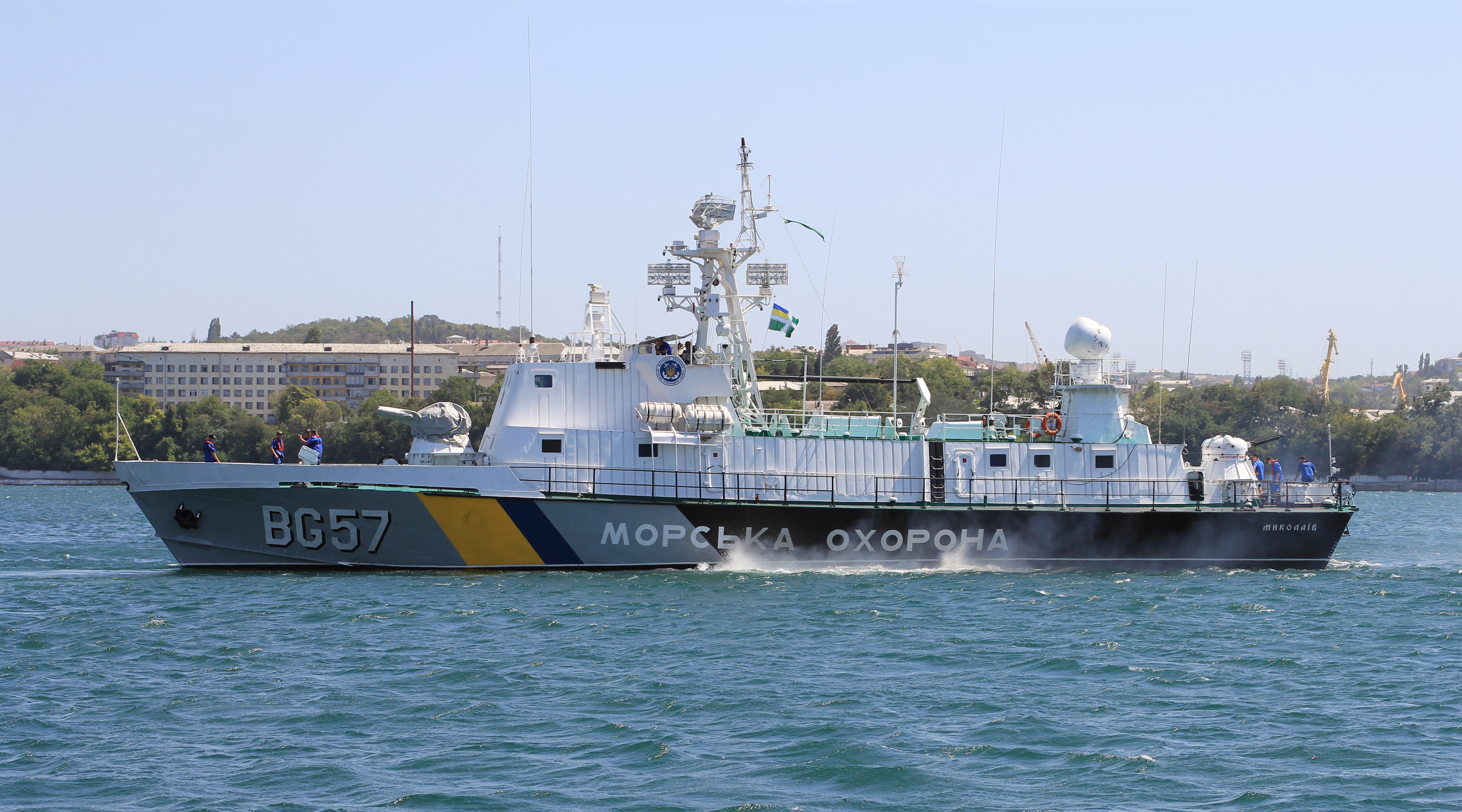
Stenka-class patrol boat BG57 Mykolaiv of the Ukrainian Sea Guard

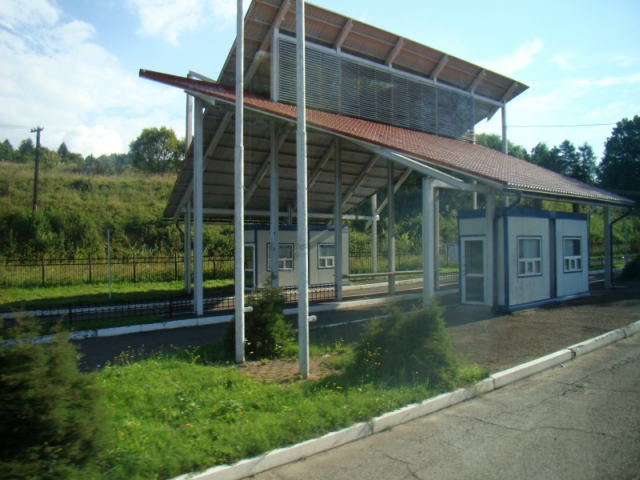
Border control post at the Poland–Ukraine border

== See also ==
- Border control
- State Border of Ukraine
- Security Service of Ukraine
- List of national border guard agencies
- Law enforcement in Ukraine
