= Mohyliv-Podilskyi Border Detachment =

Unit of the State Border Service of Ukraine

24th Mohyliv-Podilskyi Border Detachment
- 24 Могилів-Подільський прикордонний загін (Ukrainian)
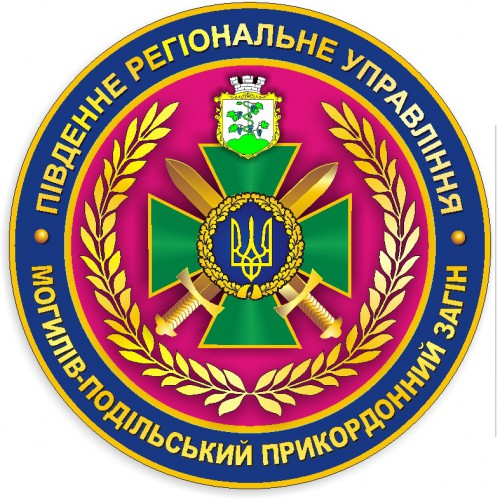
- Detachment Insignia
- Founded: 1992
- Country: Ukraine
- Allegiance: Ministry of Internal Affairs
- Branch: State Border Guard Service of Ukraine
- Type: Brigade
- Role: Border Guard
- Part of: State Border Guard Service of Ukraine
- Garrison/HQ: Mohyliv-Podilskyi
- Patron: Vyacheslav Semenov
- Engagements: Russo-Ukrainian war: War in Donbass; Russian invasion of Ukraine; Eastern Ukraine campaign

Commanders
- Current commander: Colonel Vasylyk Yury Borisovych

The Mohyliv-Podilskyi Border Detachment "Hero of Ukraine of Vyacheslav Semenov" (MUN 2193) is a brigade level detachment of the Western Department of the State Border Service of Ukraine. The detachment guards the Moldova-Ukraine border and the Transnistria border in two Raions (Mohyliv-Podilskyi Raion and Tulchyn Raion) of Vinnytsia Oblast. The detachment guards a border length of 141.2km along the Dniester with the Moldova and 49.5km with Transnistria.

== History ==
The detachment was established on 4 May 1992 in Mohyliv-Podilskyi composed of 13 outposts and support units and at the end of 1993. In 1998 , the Mohylev-Podilskyi border control unit was awarded a battle flag.

On 8 March 2014, the detachment in coordination with Moldovan border guard discovered and seized 6 canisters with 165 litres of alcohol. The detachment saw combat during the War in Donbass. Three guardsman of the detachment (Oleg Mykolayovych Hlushchak, Sokolovsky Viktor Ivanovich and Oleksandr Mykolayovych Dzyubelyuk) was killed on 27 July 2014 during the Zelenopillia rocket attack. A guardsman of the detachment (Volodymyr Oleksiyovych Blazhko) was killed on 27 July 2014 during the Battle of the Border. The deputy commander of Mohylev-Podilskyi border detachment (Semenov Vyacheslav Anatoliyovych) was killed in combat on 17 February 2015, when separatists reinforced by artillery and tanks, attacked the Fashchivka checkpoint near Debaltseve. A Russian tank fired at the positions of the border guards at close range wounding the deputy commander and while he was being evacuated, the BMP carrying him was hit by a shell and caught fire resulting in his death. On 23 August 2017, the detachment received the honorary name "Hero of Ukraine Vyacheslav Semenov", the fallen deputy commander of the detachment.

In June 2022, the detachment was involved in the construction of fortifications in Donetsk Oblast. On 1 November 2022 near Nevelske, a Guardsman of the Detachment (Strelkov Georgy Mykolayovych) was killed during Russian artillery fire while saving his comrades and was posthumously awarded the Hero of Ukraine. On 29 September 2023, the detachment received the honorary award "For Courage and Bravery". In August 2024, the detachment detained a Moldovan man who drunkenly crossed the border on a bet. On 12 November 2024, the detachment detained two draft dodgers trying to escape on inflatable boats.

== Structure ==
The structure of the Detachment is as follows:

- Management and Headquarters
- Border Service Department "Lyadova"
- Border Service Department "Mohyliv-Podilskyi"
- Border Service Department "Bronnytsia"
- Border Service Department "Yampil"
- Border Service Department "Velika Kisnytsia"
- Border Service Department "Bolhan"
- Border Service Department "Vinnytsia"
- Border Service Department "Tsekinivka"
- Border Service Department "Studena"
- Mobile Border Post "Mohyliv-Podilskyi"
- Guardian units

Following checkpoints are under detachment's operation:

- With the Republic of Moldova:
  - International Road Crossings:
    - "Mohyliv-Podilskyi-Otach"
    - "Bronnytsia-Ungry"
  - International Railway Checkpoints:
    - "Mohyliv-Podilskyi-Volchynets"
  - Local checkpoints
    - Oksanivka-Kureshnytsia
    - Mykhailivka-Kremenchug
    - Tsekinivka-Soroka
    - Velika Kisnytsia-Vasylkytsia
    - Yampil-Koseuts
  - International Ferry Crossing points:
    - "Yampil-Koseuts"
  - Highway checkpoints:
    - "Tsekinivka-Soroka"
- On the border with "Transnistria":
  - Road Crossings:
    - Bolgan-Hristova
    - Velika Kisnytsia-Khrushka *** "Studena-Rotar"
    - "Grabarivka-Oknytsia"
- Airport Checkpoints
  - "Vinnytsia International Airport"
  - "Khmelnytskyi Airport"

== Commanders ==
- Lieutenant Colonel Oleksandr Oleksandrovich Stepaniuk (May-October 1992)
- Lieutenant Colonel Mykola Hryhorovych Kolesnyk (1992-1995)
- Lieutenant Colonel Gresko Valery Petrovych (1995-2003)
- Colonel Oleg Ihorovych Valkiv (2003-2005)
- Lieutenant Colonel Kukhtei Oleg Rostislavovych (2005-2006)
- Lieutenant Colonel Vasylkivskyi Vladyslav Stanislavovych (2006-2007)
- Lieutenant Colonel Oleksandr Volodymyrovych Shamutilo (2007-2008)
- Lieutenant Colonel Ruslan Ivanovych Belei (2008-2009)
- Lieutenant Colonel Vavryniuk Valery Pavlovich (October 2009-?)
- Colonel Vasylyk Yury Borisovych (?-)

== Sources ==
- Могилів-Подільський прикордонний загін на сайті Державної прикордонної служби України
