= Serhii Deineko =

Ukrainian military officer (born 1975)

- Сергій Васильович Дейнеко
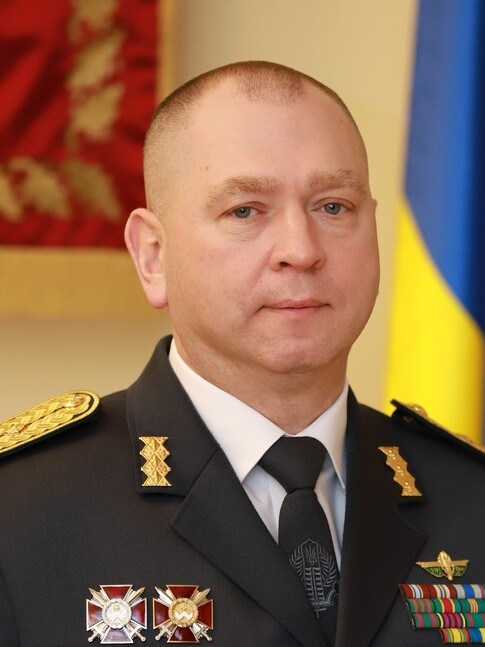

State Border Guard Service of Ukraine
- In office June 13, 2019 – January 4, 2026
- President: Volodymyr Zelenskyy
- Preceded by: Petro Tsyhikal
- Succeeded by: Valeriy Vavrynyuk

Personal details
- Born: Serhii Vasyliovych Deineko; 5 April 1975 (age 51)

Serhii Vasyliovych Deineko (Ukrainian: Сергій Васильович Дейнеко; born 5 April 1975) is a Ukrainian Lieutenant General who served as the head of Ukraine's State Border Guard Service (SBGS) from June 13, 2019 to January 4, 2026.

In 2014, at the start of the Russo-Ukrainian War, Deineko was in charge of the Luhansk Border Guard Detachment, fighting Russia in Luhansk Oblast. The detachment had to retreat, and Russia partially occupied the oblast. He later worked as deputy director of the Operational Department of the SBGS. In 2019, he was appointed head of the SBGS, replacing Petro Tsyhikal.

Deineko has served during the Russian invasion of Ukraine, which started in 2022. In the prelude to the invasion, he told Ukrainian President Volodymyr Zelenskyy that Russian troops would invade Ukraine from Belarus and through the Chernobyl exclusion zone, which was correct. The SBGS made plans to prepare for an invasion, which started on February 24, 2022. Deineko continued to serve in the SBGS, and was promoted from Major General to Lieutenant General in 2024.

== Career ==
=== Russo-Ukrainian War ===
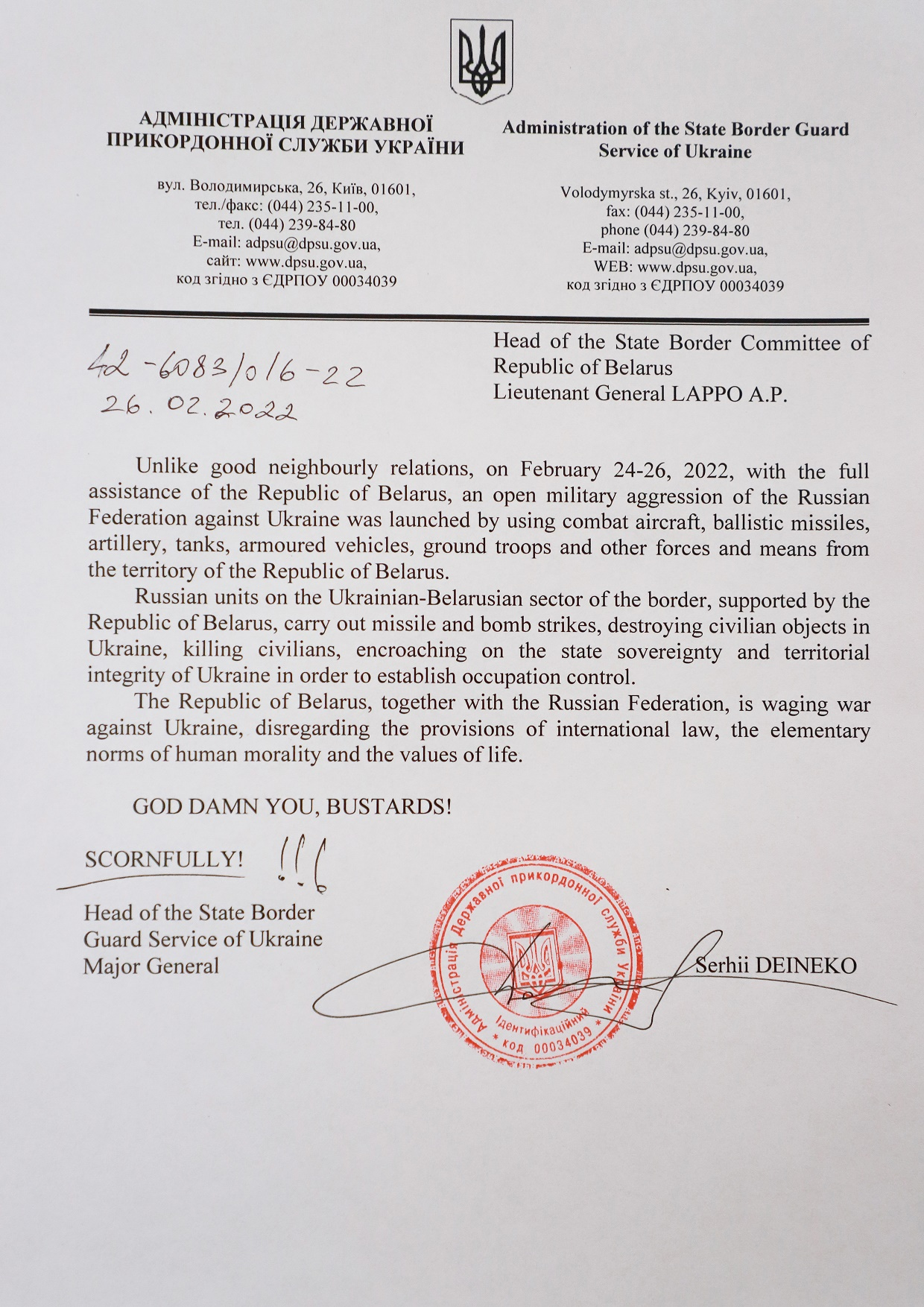
Letter from Serhii Deineko to the head of State Border Committee of Belarus, Anatoly Lappo, 26 February 2022

At the beginning of the Russo-Ukrainian War in 2014, Deineko was in charge of the Luhansk Border Guard Detachment, which started fighting Russian terrorists in June of that year in Luhansk Oblast. His troops had to retreat, and Russia partially occupied part of Luhansk Oblast in the subsequent years.

Deineko then worked for the deputy director of the Operational Department of the SBGS. On June 13, 2019, Ukrainian President Volodymyr Zelenskyy appointed him to head of the SBGS, replacing Petro Tsyhikal.

Starting in early 2021, Russia began a buildup of troops near Ukraine's border. There was second buildup later in the year. Using the SBGS' and other Western countries' intelligence, the SBGS concluded by 2022 that Russia was planning an invasion. In early February 2022, Deineko told Zelenskyy that Russia would go to war with Ukraine, and that Russia would attack Ukraine from Belarus (a Russian satellite state) and through the Chernobyl exclusion zone. The SBGS then "completely evacuated all secret documentation of personal and housing files of our staff" from multiple cities across the country, and prepared for a different Russian troop movement to surround Ukrainian soldiers currently fighting in Donetsk and Luhansk Oblasts. Despite Russian troops amassing in Crimea, Deineko did not believe Russia would invade from there, predicting it to be a false flag attack. On February 19, Deineko went to the head of the Belarusian Border Guard Service, Anatoly Lapo, and informed him of Ukraine's intelligence findings, asking him to pass the information onto Belarusian President Alexander Lukashenko. Lapo said this was not possible, which Deineko concluded was a lie; Deineko did not directly speak to him after this. On February 21, Deineko informed all Ukrainian higher authorities that there would be an invasion.

==== Russian invasion of Ukraine ====
On February 24, Russia invaded Ukraine. The invasion began at 3:40 a.m. in Luhansk Oblast. At 4:00, Deineko received reports of the invasion. He then told Minister of Foreign Affairs Denys Monastyrskyi that Ukraine was being fought on three fronts; Monastyrskyi, who had been reporting to Zelenskyy, delivered this information to him. Over the next hour, almost the entire Ukrainian border was being invaded. At 5:17, Deineko again notified Zelenskyy of the invasion via text:

Good morning, dear Mr President. Allow me to report. This is a full-scale military aggression on behalf of the Russian Federation. Several checkpoints on the border with Russia were shelled; rockets from Grads are being fired from their territory. Jet aircraft can be heard flying over the Chornobyl area. Grad rockets are also being fired from Crimea. There are five casualties so far. My units are taking positions.

As Deineko predicted, Russia invaded through Chernobyl. On February 26, Deineko sent a message to Anatoly Lapo through Deineko's Facebook page:

The Republic of Belarus, together with the Russian Federation, is waging war against Ukraine, ignoring the provisions of international law, basic norms of human morality and the value of life. WE WILL WIN! BE DAMNED, BASTARDS! WITH DISDAIN! Head of the State Border Guard Service of Ukraine, Major General Sergey Deyneko

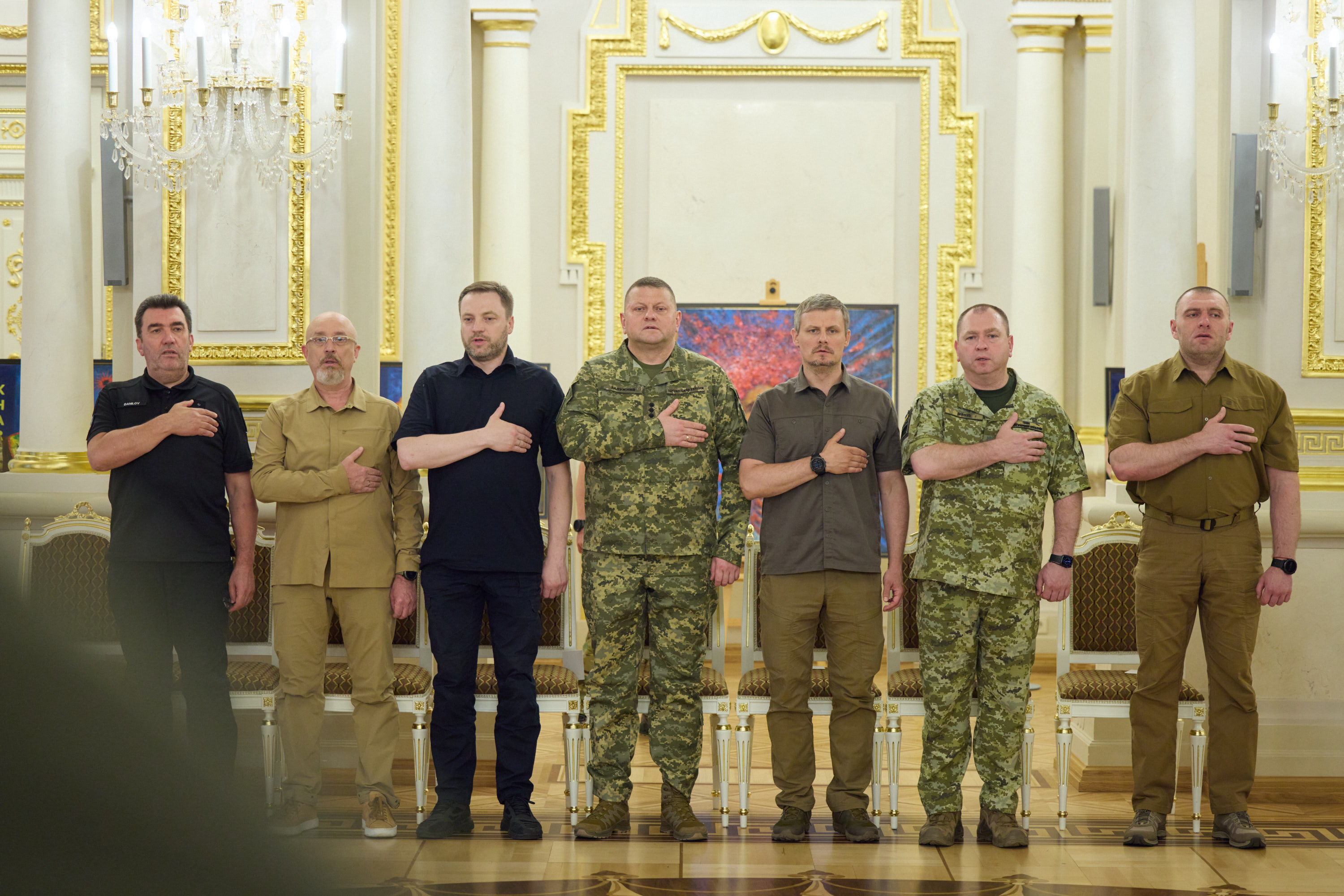
Deineko (second from the right) in a ceremony honoring Ukraine's troops in August 2022

After the invasion started, the SBGS fell under the Armed Forces of Ukraine's control. In July 2023, Zelenskyy held a meeting with Deineko and the rest of the president's Staff on the situation on the front lines, the security of nuclear power plants, and the pace of production of military equipment and ammunition. In December 2023, Deineko visited Kharkiv Oblast to inspect and discuss the positions of his troops on the front lines.

On April 30, 2024, Zelenskyy marked Border Guard Day by promoting three SBGS officials to higher ranks, including promoting Deineko from Major General to Lieutenant General. On May 23, Deineko sent an intelligence report on the situation in Chernihiv, Kharkiv, and Sumy Oblasts to Zelenskyy, who discussed the findings in a meeting Deineko and the rest of the president's Staff.

On January 4, 2026, Deineko was dismissed from office by Zelenskyy.
