= Zhytomyr Border Detachment =

Ukrainian military unit

9th Zhytomyr Border Detachment
- 9 Житомирський загін (Ukrainian)
- Detachment Insignia
- Founded: 2001
- Country: Ukraine
- Allegiance: Ministry of Internal Affairs
- Branch: State Border Guard Service of Ukraine
- Type: Brigade
- Role: Border Guard
- Part of: State Border Guard Service of Ukraine
- Garrison/HQ: Zhytomyr
- Patron: Sich Riflemen
- Engagements: Russo-Ukrainian war; War in Donbass; Russian invasion of Ukraine; Northern Ukraine campaign; Northern Ukraine border skirmishes; Eastern Ukraine campaign; Battle of Avdiivka
- Decorations: For Courage and Bravery

Commanders
- Current commander: Colonel Serhiy Melnyk

The Zhytomyr Border Detachment "Sich Riflemen" (MUN 1495) is a brigade level detachment of the Central Department of the State Border Service of Ukraine. The detachment guards the Belarus-Ukraine border in Korosten Raion of Zhytomyr Oblast and Vyshhorod Raion of Kyiv Oblast. The detachment guards a border length of 405 km: 395.5 km on land and 9.5 km on river as well as protected area of the exclusion zone and the zone of mandatory resettlement: 148.5 km along border and 142.7 km along rear.

== History ==
It was officially established on 18 January 2001, with the establishment being entrusted to Lieutenant General Yoltukhovskyi M. M. and was completed in December 2002, under Major General Myshakovskyi V. U. and started operations on 1 January 2003.

The detachment took part in the War in Donbass with 75% of its personnel being deployed to the ATO zone at various times. In 2020, the detachment neutralized illegal transfer system for smuggling of radioactive material across the border.

Following the Russian invasion of Ukraine, it was amongst the first to engage Russian troops. It took part in the Battle of Avdiivka. On 19 June 2023, the detachment was awarded the honorary award "For Courage and Bravery". Two guardsmen of the detachment (Timur Kiptenko and Ivan Shchygol) had been killed in combat in 2023. In July 2023, the detachment received FPV drones for combat operations. In June 2024, the Belarusian authorities alleged that the Zhytomyr detachment was working alongside the Russian Volunteer Corps and the Ukrainian Special Operations Forces armed with heavy weapons, multi-purpose tracked vehicles, IFVs, Bradleys, M142 HIMARSs, M777 howitzers and Flakpanzer Gepards. On 13 June 2024, the detachment recovered the stolen Jan Linsen's painting "Eliezer and Rebecca at the Well" wanted by Interpol. In November 2024, the detachment destroyed a Russian Kh-101 missile using MANPADs.

== Structure ==
The structure of the detachment is as follows:

- Management and Headquarters
- Border Service Department "Ivankiv"
- Border Service Department "Mlachivka"
- Border Service Department "Ovruch"
- Border Service Department "Luchanki"
- Border Service Department "Kopishche"
- Mobile Border Outpost "Zhytomyr"
- Guardian units

== Commanders ==
- Colonel Romaniuk I. N. (2001–2003)
- Colonel Snisar U. M. (2003–2007)
- Lieutenant Colonel Yehorov V. W. (2007–2008)
- Colonel Colgan K. P. (2007-?)
- Colonel Vavryniuk V. P. (2011–2014)
- Colonel Chernov U. M. (2016–2017)
- Colonel Koval B. M. (2017–2019)
- Lieutenant Colonel O. I. Tokovy (2019–2020)
- Colonel Kvyatkovskyi A. B. (2020–2024)
- Colonel Serhiy Melnyk (2024-)
