= Lutsk Border Detachment =

6th Lutsk Border Detachment
- 6 прикордонний Волинський загін (Ukrainian)
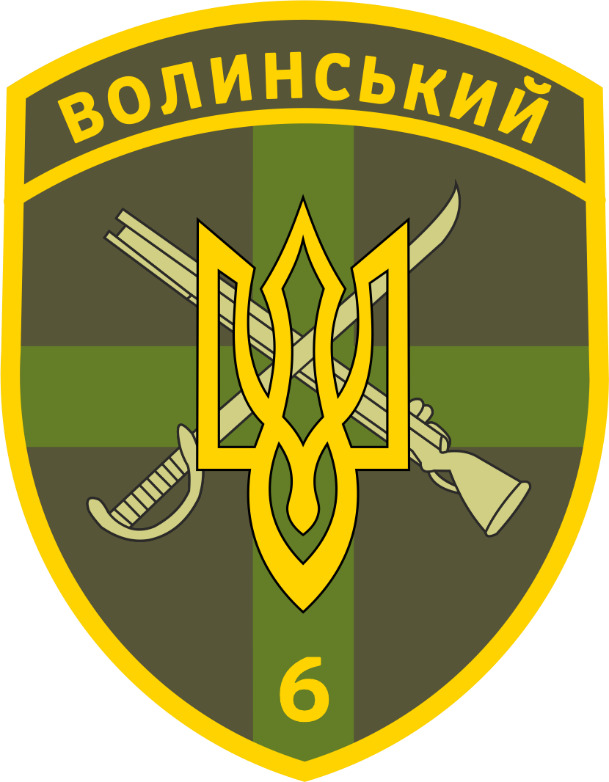
- Detachment Insignia
- Founded: 1992
- Country: Ukraine
- Allegiance: Ministry of Internal Affairs
- Branch: State Border Guard Service of Ukraine
- Type: Brigade
- Role: Border Guard
- Part of: State Border Guard Service of Ukraine
- Garrison/HQ: Lutsk
- Engagements: Russo-Ukrainian war; Russian invasion of Ukraine; Eastern Ukraine campaign; Battle of Marinka; Battle of Avdiivka

Commanders
- Current commander: Colonel Serhiy Mykolayovych Lozinsky

The Lutsk Border Detachment (MUN 9971) is a brigade level detachment of the Western Department of the State Border Service of Ukraine. The detachment guards the Poland-Ukraine border and the Ukraine-Belarus border in two Raions (Varash Raion and Sarny Raion) of Rivne Oblast and two Raions (Varash Raion and Kovel Raion) of Volyn Oblast. The detachment guards a total border length of 545.5 km, 395 km in Volyn Oblast including 190 km with Poland, including 128 km along the Western Bug River and 205 km with Belarus and 150.5 km in Rivne Oblast with Belarus.

== History ==
It was established on 20 October 1992 on the basis of the 1st border commandant's office of the Lviv border detachment and started operations on 1 January 1993 with Colonel Arkady Semenovych Yavorsky as its first commander. In 1994, a training center for 600 cadets was organized on the base of the detachment. On 20 October 1997, the Museum of Border Glory was established at the detachment's base. In 1997, the Lutsk border control unit was recognized as the best unit of Border Guards. On 23 November 2000, the Border Detachment was awarded the Battle Flag.

On 25 July 2014, a guardsman of the Lutsk Detachment (Serhii Volodymyrovych Kyrychuk) was killed during an attack by separatists at the Marynivka checkpoint and on 31 July 2014, in Vasylivka, separatists attacked the border guards mortars and grenade launchers in the Battle at the border, a soldier of the Lutsk Detachment (Serhii Mykolayovych Gulyuk) was killed. In December 2019, it became part of the Western regional administration. The detachment was equipped with 8 patrol vehicles, 3 thermographic complexes and 148 radio stations as part of the "Cross-border Cooperation Programme Poland-Belarus-Ukraine 2014-2020". On 4 May 2020, the detachment foiled smuggling attempt of 190,000 polyethylene gloves into Poland. On 19 January 2021 the detachment stopped the smuggling attempt of 210 packs of cigarettes in the air filter of a Renault truck. On 21 July 2021, the detachment seized 2,000 packs cigarettes in semi-cars being smuggled in loads of iron blooms via a freight train.

In 2023, the detachment took part in the Battle of Avdiivka. In 2023, a large contingent of the detachment took part in the Battle of Avdiivka and the Battle of Marinka. In early 2024 during a regular assault by Russian troops in Avdiivka, a large number of personnel of the detachment were injured however the group leader, Pryshnevsky Oleg Mykolayovych, coordinated their evacuation while himself counterattacking Russian troops with machine guns for which he was awarded the Hero of Ukraine. In October 2024, the detachment detained two Belorussians trying to smuggle US$2.4 Million into Belarus.

== Structure ==
The detachment is composed of:

- Management and Headquarters
- Border Service Department "Berezove"
- Border Service Department "Dubrovitsa"
- Border Service Department "Vychivka"
- Border Service Department "Rivne-airport"
- Border Service Department "Dolsk"
- Border Service Department "Samara"
- Border Service Department "Domanovo"
- Border Service Department "Tur"
- Border Service Department "Pishcha"
- Border Service Department "Hrabove"
- Border Service Department "Novogruzke"
- Border Service Department "Rivne"
- Border Service Department "Vysotsk"
- Mobile Border Post "Lutsk"
- Guardian units

Following checkpoints are under the detachment's control:

- International:
  - "Horodishche"
  - "Udrytsk"
  - "Dolsk"
  - "Domanove"
  - "Zabolottia"
  - "Pulemets"
  - "Yagodin-auto"
  - "Yagodin-z/st"
- Interstate:
  - "Prakladniki"
  - "Pishcha"
- Local:
  - "Perebrody"
  - "Vychivka"
  - "Samara"
  - "Tur"
  - "Huta

== Commanders ==
- Colonel Arkady Semenovych Yavorskyi (January 1993-September 1996)
- Lieutenant Colonel Volodymyr Petrovych Malakov (September 1996 – 1999)
- Lieutenant Colonel Mykola Yakovych Babachuk (1999–2002)
- Lieutenant Colonel Oleksandr Oleksandrovich Kalashnikov (2002–2004)
- Lieutenant Colonel Viktor Ivanovich Melnychenko (2004–2006)
- Colonel Bondar Volodymyr Anatoliyovych (October 2006 – 2008)
- Colonel Volodymyr Bondar (2008–2009)
- Lieutenant Colonel Oleksiy Shipilov (March 2010-December 211)
- Colonel Oleksandr Bilyuk (December 2011-August 2014)
- Lieutenant Colonel Oleksandr Meiko (December 2014-March 2016)
- Lieutenant Colonel Solovei Oleksandr Ivanovich (4 April-6 September 2016)
- Colonel Mykola Volodymyrovych Skarvinko (September 2016-September 2019)
- Colonel Ruslan Petrovych Rumilov (September 2019-January 2020)
- Colonel Vovk Oleg Omelyanovych (January 2020-July 2021)
- Colonel Serhiy Mykolayovych Lozinsky (July 2021-)
