= Lviv Border Detachment =

7th Lviv Border Detachment
- 7 Львівський прикордонний загін (Ukrainian)
- Detachment Insignia
- Founded: 1992
- Country: Ukraine
- Allegiance: Ministry of Internal Affairs
- Branch: State Border Guard Service of Ukraine
- Type: Brigade
- Role: Border Guard
- Part of: State Border Guard Service of Ukraine
- Garrison/HQ: Lviv
- Engagements: Russo-Ukrainian war; Russian invasion of Ukraine; Eastern Ukraine campaign; Battle of Vovchansk; Battle of Marinka; Battle of Bakhmut

Commanders
- Current commander: Colonel Anatoly Fedorchuk

The Lviv Border Detachment (MUN 2144) also known as the Carpathian Border Detachment is a brigade level detachment of the Western Department of the State Border Service of Ukraine. The detachment guards the Poland-Ukraine border in four Raions (Lviv Raion, Sambir Raion, Yavoriv Raion and Sheptytskyi Raion) of Lviv Oblast. The detachment guards a total border length of 279 km including 50 km riverine and 107 km mountainous.

== History ==
The detachment was established in 1993 to guard the western border of Ukraine.

On 29 December 2017, a guardsman of the detachment (Volodymyr Volodymyrovych Salivonchyk) was killed by separatists at a checkpoint near Volnovakha. In 2019, the detachment detained 5 Turkish citizens trying to illegally cross the border into EU. The detachment received 8 patrol vehicles, 3 mobile thermal vision complexes and 126 radio stations as part of the "Cross-border Cooperation Programme Poland-Belarus-Ukraine 2014-2020". In January 2021, the detachment seized 410 packs of cigarettes under the decorative trim of the ceiling of a Ford car being smuggled into Poland.

Following the start of the Russian invasion of Ukraine, the detachment intensified its duties on the western border as well as on the frontlines. From February to mid November 2022, the detachment detained 107 people trying to illegally cross the border to escape conscription. On 29 January 2023, a guardsman of the detachment (Mykhailo Fedorovych Chop) was killed in Blagodatne. In March 2023, the detachment stopped 3,000 people from crossing the border including 170 with falsified documents and foiled 68 smuggling attempts of items worth more than UAH 1 million as well as 200 ammunition units. Now the police are dealing with these cases, On 21 April 2023, a guardsman of the detachment was killed in Bakhmut. On 29 September 2023, the Detachment was awarded the honorary award "For Courage and Bravery". In early 2024, the detachment exposed a schemes to smuggle 130 vehicles into Ukraine without paying duties under the guise of military aid. In June 2024, the detachment struck Russian positions using FPV drones and ATGMs. On 21 June 2024, a guardsman of the detachment (Andriy Kurylo) was killed in action. In August 2024, the detachment received 50 DJI Mavic 3 Pro UAVs donated by volunteers. The Shkval unit of the detachment has seen extensive combat in the Battle of Bakhmut and the Battle of Vovchansk. The Shkval Special Unit of the detachment were operating in the Serebryansky forest in November 2024. Also in November 2024 the detachment seized food supplements, items labeled as CBD-cannabidiol and electronic cigarettes worth 700 thousand hryvnias being smuggled. On 13 November 2024, the "Shkval" unit of the detachment captured a Russian soldier, killed twelve Russian soldiers and wounded multiple more in Serebryansky forest. On 15 November 2024, the Shkval unit of the detachment again struck Russian positions using FPV drones.

== Structure ==
The detachment includes:

- Management and Headquarters
- Border Service Department "Nismychi"
- Border Service Department "Rava-Ruska"
- Border Service Department "Krakivets"
- Border Service Department "Sheghini"
- Border Service Department "Smilnytsia"
- Border Service Department "Syanky"
- Border Service Department "Lviv International Airport"
- Type-C Border Service Department
- Rapid Response Unit "Shkval"
- Guardian Units

The detachment has 10 checkpoints under its operations which includes 6 Automobile Checkpoints, 3 Railway Checkpoints and 1 Airport Checkpoint.

== Commanders ==
- Colonel V. A. Popov (-1993)
- Major General Rylkov V. AT. (1993–1998)
- Colonel Nishpor O. P. (1998–2003)
- Colonel Shchyr V. D. (2003–2004)
- Lieutenant Colonel Andrusyk I. Y. (2004)
- Colonel Ambros I. N. (2004–2008)
- Colonel Havyak V. R. (2008–2011)
- Lieutenant Colonel Adamchuk O. N. (October 2011-July 2014)
- Colonel V. M. Kravchuk (July 2014-May 2016)
- Lieutenant Colonel Serhii Oleksandrovych Melnyk (May 2016 – 2018)
- Lieutenant Colonel Cherny O. V. (2018-August 2019)
- Colonel I. I. Rymarchuk (August 2019-January 2021)
- Colonel Fedorchuk A. V. (January 2021-)
