= Berdyansk Border Detachment =

8th Berdyansk Border Detachment
- 8-й Бердянський прикордонний загін (Ukrainian)
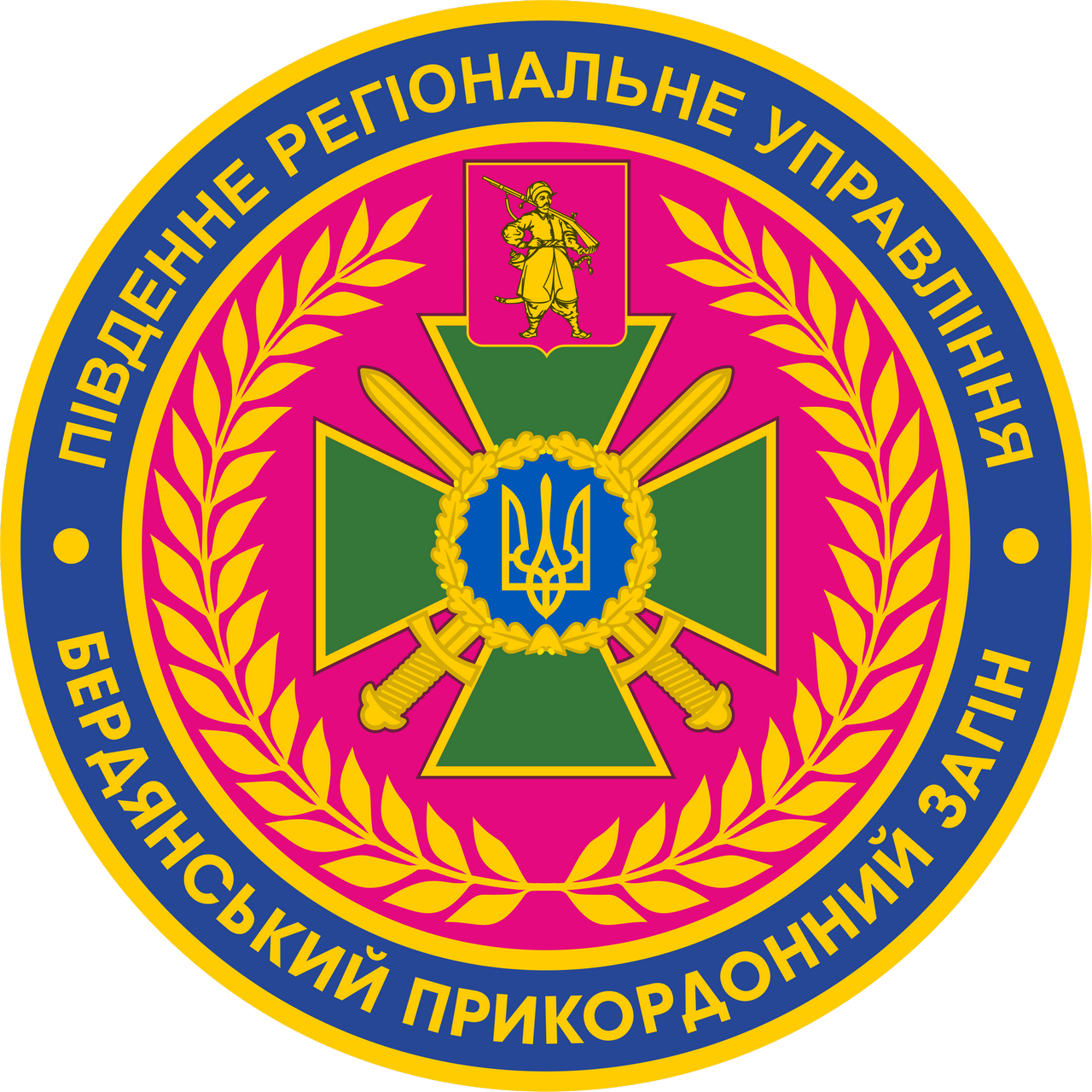
- Detachment Insignia
- Founded: 2001
- Country: Ukraine
- Allegiance: Ministry of Internal Affairs
- Branch: State Border Guard Service of Ukraine
- Type: Brigade
- Role: Border Guard
- Part of: State Border Guard Service of Ukraine
- Garrison/HQ: Berdiansk
- Engagements: Russo-Ukrainian war; War in Donbass; Battle of Mariupol (2014); Russian invasion of Ukraine; Southern Ukraine campaign
- Decorations: For Courage and Bravery

Commanders
- Current commander: Colonel Pavlyk Oleksandr Mykolayovych

Insignia
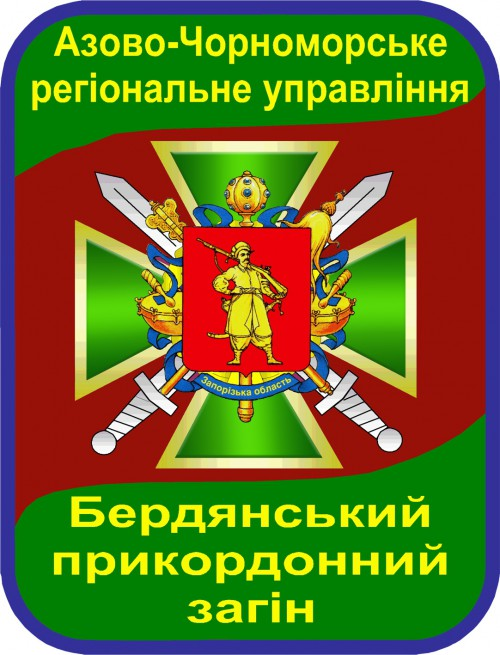
- Former Insignia

The Berdyansk Border Detachment (MUN 1491) is a brigade level detachment of the Southern Regional Department of the State Border Service of Ukraine. The detachment guards the Sea of Azov and the "border" with Crimea (occupied by Russia) in two raions (Melitopol Raion and Berdiansk Raion) of Zaporizhia Oblast as well as guarding the Port of Berdiansk and Zaporizhzhia International Airport with a total length of 395.5 km. Due to the Russian occupation of Zaporizhzhia Oblast, its operations along the coast are currently suspended and it currently operates against Russian forces on the frontlines.

== History ==
The detachment was established on 10 February 2001 following the presidential decree for its establishment on 16 November 2000 and started its operations on 15 April 2001. The detachment included five border outposts, two border control units and guardian units, which guarded a section along the coast of the Sea of Azov within Zaporizhzhia Oblast and Kherson Oblast. Colonel Anatoliy Serafimovych Podoplelov was appointed as its first commander and Colonel Serhii Gennadiyovych Fomenko was appointed as its chief of staff. In May 2008, its size and duties were expanded and again following the start of the Russo-Ukrainian war.

After the Russian invasion of Crimea, it started operations along the border with Crimea. Following the start of the War in Donbass, it saw combat against separatists. On 6 July 2014, the detachment captured a member of Donetsk People’s Republic armed forces at "Chonhar" Border Control post and his Chevrolet vehicle was captured. On 13 July 2014, a part of the detachment was deployed to fight in the Battle of Mariupol where two guardsmen temporarily attached to the detachment (Volodymyr Volodymyrovych Grechany and Epifanov Serhii Petrovych) were killed on 14 July. It continued to operate on checkpoints in Mariupol where the detachment accidentally killed a civilian in a vehicle that failed to stop at a checkpoint. In July 2015, it detained two people trying to illegally cross from Crimea.

On 16 April 2020, the detachment detected and detained two poachers fishing illegally. In November 2020, it received naval assistance from US. In July 2021, the detachment along with Azov police department conducted a raid, they discovered 25 cannabis plants weighing 40+ kg and about 1 kg cannabis in dried form and subsequently destroyed it. In January 2022, it detained 15 potential illegal migrants and an illegal fisherman.

On 24 February 2022, a part of the detachment was deployed to the front of the Russian invasion of Ukraine. The Detachment was tasked to track Russian movements in the Sea of Azov. On 27 February 2022, three days after the Russian invasion of Ukraine began, Berdiansk was captured by the Russian Army. In November 2022, while performing tasks on the frontlines they discovered and neutralized a 152 mm divisional self-propelled howitzer "Acacia". On 29 January 2023, two officers of the Berdyansk Detachment, Colonel Oleksandr Dotsenko and his wife Lieutenant Colonel Nelya Dotsenko died in Khmelnytskyi Oblast as a result of a strike while on a short leave to home. On 19 July 2023, it was awarded the honorary award "For Courage and Bravery". Following the Destruction of the Kakhovka Dam, the detachment was involved in rescue and relief operations of those affected by the flooding as well as Demining operations near the coast. In March 2024, the Berdyansk Detachment in coordination with Khortytsia Brigade destroyed a Russian Murom-M complex. On 8 November 2024, the detachment struck Russian positions in Kamianka-Dniprovska across from Nikopol.

== Structure ==
The detachment is composed of:

- Management and Headquarters
- Border Service Department "Kyrilovka"
- Border Service Department "Priazovsk"
- Border Service Department "Primorsk"
- Border Service Department "Berdyansk"
- Border Service Department "Zaporizhia"
- Border Service Department "Genichesk"
- Border Service Department "Chongar"
- Border Service Department "Blagovishchenka"
- Border Service Department "Blagovishchenka"
- Border Service Department Melitopol"
- Border Service Department "Novooleksiiivka"
- Mobile Border Outpost "Berdyansk"
- Aerial Division
  - Airport Outpost "Zaporizhzhia"
- Marine Division
  - Seaport Outpost "Berdiansk"
- Guardian units

== Commanders ==
- Colonel Anatoliy Serafimovych Podoplelov (April 2001-November 2002)
- Colonel Pluzhnyk Vasyl Petrovych (March 2003-November 2004)
- Colonel Mykola Pavlovich Zamelyuk (February 2005-September 2006)
- Colonel Radaev Anatoly Valeryovich (September 2006-September 2008)
- Colonel Veretilnyk Vitaly Viktorovych (September 2008-December 2011)
- Colonel Marchuk Volodymyr Mykolayovych (December 2011-February 2014)
- Colonel Yurii Mykhailovych Chernov (February 2014-December 2014)
- Colonel Britsky Vadim Vasyliovych (December 2014-July 2015)
- Lieutenant Colonel Popik Oleksandr Mykolayovych (July 2015–December 2015)
- Colonel Martynyuk Oleksandr Volodymyrovych (January 2016-May 2018)
- Colonel Yuriy Borisovich Kovalchuk (May 2018-December 2019)
- Colonel Tsymbal Ruslan Oleksandrovych (January 2020-August 2020)
- Colonel Oleg Volodymyrovych Chichanovsky (August 2020-September 2022)
- Colonel Gidzula Volodymyr Oleksandrovych (September 2022-December 2023)
- Colonel Pavlyk Oleksandr Mykolayovych (December 2023-)
