= Shostka Border Detachment =

- Шосткинський загін (Ukrainian)
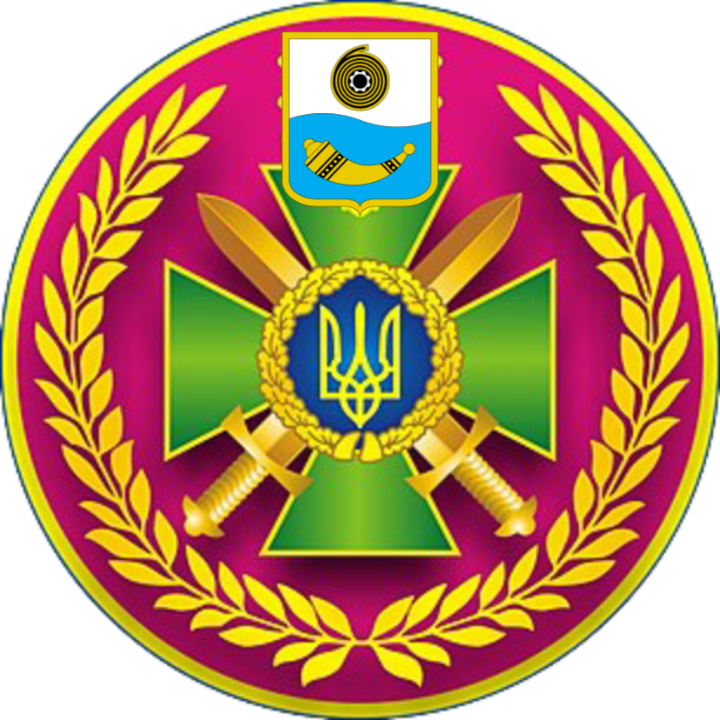
- Detachment Insignia
- Founded: 2018
- Country: Ukraine
- Allegiance: Ministry of Internal Affairs
- Branch: State Border Guard Service of Ukraine
- Type: Battalion
- Role: Border Guard
- Part of: State Border Guard Service of Ukraine
- Garrison/HQ: Shostka
- Engagements: Russo-Ukrainian war: War in Donbass; Russian invasion of Ukraine; Northern Ukraine campaign; Northern Ukraine border skirmishes
- Decorations: For Courage and Bravery

Commanders
- Current commander: Colonel Yuriy Sambor

The Shostka Border Detachment (MUN 1569) is a battalion level detachment of the Eastern Department of the State Border Service of Ukraine. The detachment guards the Russia-Ukraine border in the Shostka Raion of the Sumy Oblast and following the Russian invasion of Ukraine, it saw direct combat against Russian forces. The detachment guards a total border length of 250 km.

== History ==
It was established on 10 October 2018, in order to strengthen the Russia-Ukraine border in Sumy Oblast.

Following the Russian invasion of Ukraine, the detachment saw extensive combat. On 29 April 2022, more than 30 mortars were fired into the Sumy Oblast from the Russian settlement of Gorodishche. Explosions were reported in the Shostka Raion in the area of the detachment. The Russian military shelled Hlukhiv with rocket launchers on 8–9 May, damaging a Jewish cemetery. On 13 May 2022, Russia fired on a border village in the Shostka district using unguided air missiles. On 13 May 2022, Russia fired on a border village in the Shostka Raion using unguided air missiles. As shelling continued, Russian forces defeated a few elements of the Shostka detachment and entered Shostka district on 16 May. Fighting continued until 17 May 2022, when the Russian forces withdrew. On 18 May 2022, ten explosions were heard in Hlukhiv. Russian forces used flechettes on border villages in the Shostka district on 30 May 2022. Shalyhyne was struck by Russian forces on 26 June in Sumy Oblast. Russian forces shelled numerous border towns including Hlukhiv on 1 July 2022. On 3 July 2022, Russian forces fired at Shalyhyne in Shostka Raion with 12 strikes recorded. Russian troops then fired on Esman. Later that day, 14 mortar projectiles were launched again on Shalyhyne.

== Structure ==
The structure of the detachment is as follows:

- Management and Headquarters
- Border Service Department "Znob-Novgorodske"
- Border Service Department "Seredina-Buda"
- Border Service Department "Svesa"
- Border Service Department "Shostka"
- Rapid Response Border Command Unit "Shostka"
- Guardian units

== Commanders ==
- Colonel Yuriy Sambor (2019–)
