= Chop Border Detachment =

94th Chop Border Detachment
- 94 прикордонний загін (Ukrainian)
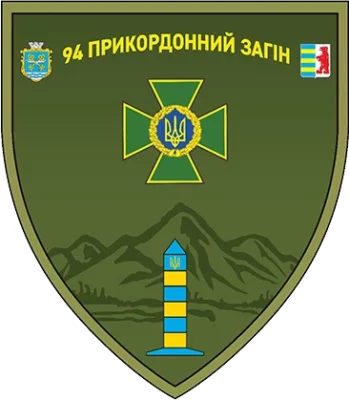
- Detachment Insignia
- Founded: 1993
- Country: Ukraine
- Allegiance: Ministry of Internal Affairs
- Branch: State Border Guard Service of Ukraine
- Type: Brigade
- Role: Border Guard
- Part of: State Border Guard Service of Ukraine
- Garrison/HQ: Chop
- Engagements: Russo-Ukrainian war; Russian invasion of Ukraine; Northern Ukraine campaign; Northern Ukraine border skirmishes; Eastern Ukraine campaign; Battle of Bakhmut

Commanders
- Current commander: Colonel Vitrovchak Vasyl Hryhorovych

Insignia
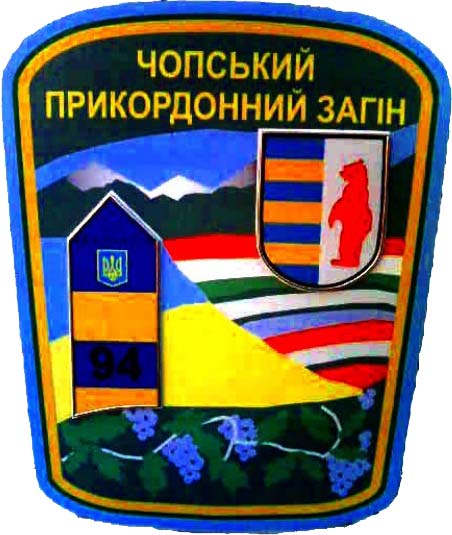
- Former Insignia

The Chop Border Detachment (MUN 1493) is a brigade level detachment of the Central Department of the State Border Service of Ukraine. The detachment guards the Poland-Ukraine border, Hungary-Ukraine border and the Ukraine-Romania border in Uzhhorod Raion of Zakarpattia Oblast as well as the Uzhhorod International Airport. The detachment guards border length 149.4 km, 83 km mountainous, 19.6 km riverine and 46.8 km in plains.

== History ==
On 1 March 1993, it was established as a separate checkpoint. On 1 August 2003, it became part of the Western Regional Administration State Border Service of Ukraine as the Chop Detachment established by the union the Zakarpattia checkpoint and 12 border outposts of the Mukachevo border detachment. It was reformed and organized in 2008.

It saw combat during the War in Donbass. On 10 October 2014, near Novotroitskyi, a convoy of the border guards was attacked with small arms resulting in the death of two guardsmen of the detachment (Kis Robert Petrovych and Viktor Mykolayovych Shepental) and wounding of five more. In September 2016, the detachment detained a female dual citizen of Ukraine and Hungary who was allegedly trying to illegally cross the border.

Following the Russian invasion of Ukraine, it saw combat against Russian forces. In October 2022, it conducted coordination activities with Slovakian personnel. On 17 November 2022, a guardsman of the detachment (Serhiy Churey) was killed during a skirmish with Russian forces in the Chernihiv Oblast. Сергій Чурей In December 2022, the detachment liquidated an illegal human transit network which smuggled people into Slovakia to avoid conscription. The detachment's personnel saw combat during the Battle of Bakhmut during which a conscripted guardsman of the detachment (Maxim Musienko) was captured by Russian force. and another guardsman of the detachment (Ostap Bohdanovich Brynskyi) was killed during the Battle of Bakhmut on 19 August 2023 In November 2023, a guardsman of the detachment (Maxim Mykolayovych Hlebov) was killed in combat. On 2 December 2023, the detachment detained 8 draft dodgers trying to illegally cross the border into Slovakia. On 10 March 2024, the detachment attacked and detained three people trying to avoid conscription illegally by fleeing to Slovakia near Novoselytsia and a fourth person was tracked by a FPV drone and captured. On 22 May 2024, the detachment detained five people trying to escape conscription. In September 2024, the detachment discovered a cache of WW1 era weaponry including 4,500 rounds of 7.62mm ammunition, 3 hand grenades, and 75 Mosin rifles while patrolling near the Polish border.

== Structure ==
The detachment includes:

- Management and Headquarters
- Border Service Department "Verkhovyna-Bystra"
- Border Service Department "Stuzhitsa"
- Border Service Department "Knyaginya"
- Border Service Department "Velikiy Bereznyi"
- Border Service Department "Novoselitsya"
- Border Service Department "Huta"
- Border Service Department "Uzhhorod"
- Border Service Department "Palad Komarivtsi"
- Border Service Department "Tysa"
- Border Service Department "Salovka"
- Border Service Department " Chop";
- P-type Department "Veliky Berezny"
- P-type Department "Uzhhorod"
- Mobile Border Outpost "Chop"
- Guardian units

10 checkpoints are under the detachment's operation

- 5 Railway Checkpoints
  - "Pavlovo"
  - "Straz"
  - "Druzhba"
  - "Chop"
  - "Salovka"
- 3 Automobile Checkpoints
  - "Malyy Berezny"
  - "Uzhhorod"
  - "Tysa"
- 1 Airport Checkpoint
  - "Uzhhorod International Airport"
- 1 Pedestrian Checkpoint
  - "Mali Selmentsi"

== Commanders ==
- Colonel Varnavsky O.F. (-1994)
- Colonel V. G. Panasenko (1994–1995)
- Colonel N. S. Khoruzhiy (1995–1998)
- Colonel Panchokha N. P. (1998–2002)
- Colonel Oleksandr Ivanovich Zyshchuk (2002–2004)
- Colonel Horbenko Artur Ivanovich (2004)
- Colonel Oleksandr Leontiyovych Lutskyi (2004–2005)
- Colonel Oleg Ihorovych Valkiv (2005–2006)
- Colonel Mykhailo Vasylyovych Khobta (2006–2008)
- Lieutenant Colonel Vitaliy Mykolayovych Verbytskyi (2008)
- Colonel Yury Oleksandrovych Sambor (2008–2012)
- Colonel Oleksiy Viktorovych Havel (2013–2014)
- Colonel Ivan Pavlovich Chaplinskyi (2015)
- Colonel Domenyuk Ihor Mykolayovych (2016)
- Colonel Bilyavets Serhiy Yakovych (2016–2017)
- Lieutenant Colonel Mykhailiuk Yurii Oleksandrovych (2017–2019)
- Colonel Ruslan Valeriyovych Tsapyuk (2019–2024)
- Colonel Vitrovchak Vasyl Hryhorovych (2024–)

== Sources ==
- Чопський прикордонний загін Державної прикордонної служби України
