= List of airports by ICAO code: U =

List of airports by ICAO code: A - B - C - D - EB-EG - EH-EY - FA-FM - FN-FZ - G - H - ~~I~~ - J - KA-KH - KI-KP - KR-KZ - LA-LJ - LK-LZ - M - N - O - P - Q - R - SA-SC - SD-SH - SI - SJ - SK-SM - SN-SP - SQ - SS-SU - SV-SY - T - U - V - W - ~~X~~ - YA-YG - YH-YQ - YR-YZ - Z

The prefix 'U' is used for Russia and all the former Soviet republics except Moldova (LU), Estonia (EE), Latvia (EV) and Lithuania (EY). Each former Soviet republic or group of them is assigned a 2-character (Ux) prefix and Russia has 10 prefixes. The only exception is the prefix UM, which, while used for Belarus airports, is also used for few aerodromes in Russia's Kaliningrad Oblast exclave, including Khrabrovo airport (UMKK).

Prior to breakup of the Soviet Union, Latvian SSR and Lithuanian SSR used prefix UM, Estonian SSR used UL and Moldavian SSR used UK (see Former Codes section for their historical codes).

== UA - Kazakhstan ==
Also see airport category and list.

ICAO	IATA	Airport name	Community	Coordinates	Notes
UAAA	ALA	Almaty International Airport	Almaty	43°21′19″N 077°02′41″E	
UAAH	BXH	Balkhash Airport	Balkhash	46°53′38″N 075°00′19″E	
UAAL	USJ	Usharal Airport	Usharal	46°11′25″N 080°49′53″E	
UAAR	BXJ	Boraldai Airport	Almaty	43°21′06″N 076°52′57″E	
UAAT	TDK	Taldykorgan Airport	Taldykorgan	45°07′21″N 078°26′34″E	
UACC	NQZ	Nursultan Nazarbayev International Airport	Nur-Sultan	51°01′19″N 071°28′01″E	
UACK	KOV	Kokshetau Airport	Kokshetau (Kokchetav)	53°19′48″N 069°35′48″E	
UACP	PPK	Petropavl Airport (Petropavlovsk Airport)	Petropavl	54°46′28″N 069°11′06″E	
UADD	DMB	Taraz Airport	Taraz	42°51′13″N 071°18′13″E	
UAII	CIT	Shymkent International Airport	Shymkent (Chimkent)	42°21′54″N 069°28′34″E	
UAIK		Bozhban Airport	Kok-Sary	42°44′44″N 067°28′51″E	
UAIT	HSA	Hazrat Sultan International Airport	Turkistan	43°18′40″N 068°33′01″E	
UAKD	DZN	Zhezkazgan Airport	Zhezkazgan	47°42′32″N 067°44′21″E	
UAKK	KGF	Sary-Arka Airport (Karaganda Airport)	Karaganda	49°40′17″N 073°20′11″E	
UAOL	BXY	Baikonur Krayniy Airport	Baikonur	45°37′25″N 063°12′50″E	
UAON		Yubileyniy Airport	Baikonur	46°03′00″N 063°14′00″E	
UAOO	KZO	Kyzylorda Airport	Kyzylorda	44°42′25″N 065°35′33″E	
UARR	URA	Oral Ak Zhol Airport (Uralsk Airport)	Oral (Uralsk)	51°09′03″N 051°32′35″E	
UASB	EKB	Ekibastuz Airport	Ekibastuz	51°35′36″N 075°13′23″E	
UASI		Satbay Airport	Satbay	47°36′54″N 084°34′14″E	
UASK	UKK	Oskemen Airport (Ust-Kamenogorsk Airport)	Oskemen (Ust Kamenogorsk)	50°02′10″N 082°29′39″E	
UASP	PWQ	Pavlodar Airport	Pavlodar	52°11′42″N 077°04′26″E	
UASS	PLX	Semey Airport (Semipalatinsk Airport)	Semey (Semipalatinsk)	50°21′05″N 080°14′04″E	
UASU	UZR	Urzhar Airport	Urzhar	47°05′32″N 081°39′27″E	
UASW		Katon-Karagay Airport	Oskamen	49°10′43″N 085°14′59″E	Not yet open
UASZ	SZI	Zaysan Airport	Zaysan	47°29′13″N 084°53′17″E	
UATB		Kenderali Airport	Kenderali Resort	42°56′06″N 052°32′54″E	
UATE	SCO	Aktau Airport	Aktau	43°51′36″N 051°05′31″E	
UATG	GUW	Atyrau Airport	Atyrau	47°07′19″N 051°49′17″E	
UATT	AKX	Aktobe Airport	Aktobe (Aktyubinsk)	50°14′45″N 057°12′24″E	
UATZ		Tengiz Airport	Kulsary	46°18′07″N 053°25′39″E	
UAUR	AYK	Arkalyk Airport	Arkalyk	50°19′30″N 066°57′36″E	
UAUU	KSN	Kostanay Airport	Kostanay	53°12′25″N 063°33′01″E	

== UB - Azerbaijan ==
Also see airport category and list.

ICAO	IATA	Airport name	Community	Coordinates	Notes
UBBA		Akstafa Airport	Agstafa	41°07′24″N 045°25′17″E	
UBBB	GYD	Heydar Aliyev International Airport	Baku	40°28′03″N 050°02′48″E	
UBBC		Çilov Heliport	Baku	40°32′04″N 050°32′08″E	
UBBF	FZL	Fuzuli International Airport	Fuzuli	39°59′44″N 047°19′06″E	
UBBG	GNJ	Ganja International Airport	Ganja	40°44′15″N 046°19′03″E	
UBBH		Khachmaz Airport	Khachmaz	41°45′16″N 048°26′01″E	
UBBI		Nasosnaya Air Base	Sumqayit	40°35′29″N 049°33′26″E	
UBBL	LLK	Lankaran International Airport	Lankaran	38°44′47″N 048°49′04″E	
UBBM		Hajiqabul Airport	Hajiqabul	40°02′07″N 048°54′36″E	
UBBN	NAJ	Nakhchivan International Airport	Nakhchivan	39°11′19″N 045°27′30″E	
UBBP		Parallahi Heliport	Baku	40°25′05″N 050°21′23″E	
UBBQ	GBB	Qabala International Airport	Qabala	40°49′36″N 047°42′45″E	
UBBS		Khocali Airport	Khocali	39°54′05″N 046°47′13″E	
UBBY	ZTU	Zaqatala International Airport	Zaqatala	41°33′44″N 046°40′02″E	
UBBZ	ZZE	Zangilan International Airport	Zangilan	39°05′40″N 046°44′03″E	
UBCH		Central Hospital Heliport	Baku	40°39′07″N 049°30′18″E	
UBEA		Agdam Airport	Agdam District	39°58′33″N 047°00′00″E	
UBEE	YLV	Yevlakh Airport	Yevlakh	40°37′57″N 047°08′28″E	
UBEI		Shaki Airport	Shaki	41°08′11″N 047°09′34″E	
UBEN		Naftalan Airport	Naftalan	40°30′57″N 046°49′46″E	
UBEY		Aghjabadi Airport	Aghjabadi	40°01′20″N 047°26′57″E	
UBLC	LHL	Lachin International Airport	Lachin District	39°53′11″N 046°21′15″E	
UBLL		Lokbatan Airport	Baku	40°20′59″N 049°40′11″E	Military
UBTT		Zabrat Airport	Baku	40°29′42″N 049°58′37″E	

== UC - Kyrgyzstan ==
Also see airport category and list.

ICAO	IATA	Airport name	Community	Coordinates
UCFA		Tamga Airport	Tamga	42°09′11″N 077°33′50″E
UCFB		Batken Airport	Batken	40°02′33″N 070°50′17″E
UCFE		Kerben Airport	Kerben	41°29′04″N 071°44′01″E
UCFF		Tokmok Airport	Tokmok	42°49′44″N 075°20′09″E
UCFG		Cholpon-Ata Airport	Cholpon-Ata	42°39′13″N 077°03′24″E
UCFJ		Jalal-Abad Airport	Jalal-Abad	40°56′39″N 072°58′40″E
UCFL		Tamchy Airport	Tamchy	42°35′18″N 076°42′48″E
UCFM	BSZ	Manas International Airport	Bishkek	43°03′40″N 074°28′39″E
UCFN		Naryn Airport	Naryn	41°26′29″N 076°07′50″E
UCFO	OSS	Osh Airport	Osh	40°36′32″N 072°47′35″E
UCFP		Karakol International Airport	Karakol	42°30′29″N 078°24′28″E
UCFR		Razzakov Airport	Isfana	39°49′29″N 069°34′08″E
UCFS		Kyzyl-Kiya Airport	Kyzyl-Kiya	40°16′18″N 072°02′49″E
UCFT		Talas Airport	Talas	42°30′21″N 072°15′47″E
UCFW		Kant Air Base	Kant	42°51′11″N 074°50′47″E
UCFX		Toktogul Airport	Toktogul	41°52′40″N 072°51′44″E
UCFZ		Kazarman Airport	Kazarman	41°24′37″N 074°02′39″E

== UD - Armenia ==
Also see airport category and list.

ICAO	IATA	Airport name	Community	Coordinates	Notes
UDCK	YUK	Syunik Airport	Kapan	39°12′08″N 046°27′15″E	
UDGS	OIS	Goris Airport	Goris	39°27′03″N 046°20′47″E	Closed
UDLS		Stepanavan Airport	Stepanavan	41°02′54″N 044°20′13″E	Closed
UDSG	LWN	Shirak Airport	Gyumri	40°45′01″N 043°51′33″E	
UDYE		Erebuni Airport	Yerevan	40°07′19″N 044°27′53″E	Military
UDYZ	EVN	Zvartnots International Airport	Zvartnots (near Yerevan)	40°08′50″N 044°23′45″E	

== UE - Russia (Sakha Republic) ==
Note: Only codes for Russian airports that are listed in this publication in the "International" column are listed here.

Also see airport category and list.

ICAO	IATA	Airport name	Community	Coordinates
UEBB	BQJ	Batagay Airport	Bagatay	67°38′52″N 134°41′37″E
UEEA	ADH	Aldan Airport	Aldan	58°36′11″N 125°24′26″E
UEEE	YKS	Platon Oyunsky Yakutsk International Airport	Yakutsk	62°05′36″N 129°46′14″E
UELL	NER	Chulman Neryungri Airport	Chulman / Neryungri	56°54′48″N 124°54′42″E
UEMH	KDY	Teply Klyuch Airport	Khandyga	62°47′10″N 136°50′32″E
UEMO	OLZ	Olyokminsk Airport	Olyokminsk	60°23′57″N 120°27′51″E
UENN	NYR	Nyurba Airport	Nyurba	63°17′50″N 118°20′49″E
UERL	ULK	Lensk Airport	Lensk	60°43′14″N 114°49′33″E
UERP	PYJ	Polyarny Airport	Polyarnyj	66°25′00″N 112°30′00″E
UERR	MJZ	Mirny Airport	Mirny	62°32′04″N 114°01′20″E
UESO	CKH	Chokurdakh Airport	Chokurdakh	70°37′30″N 147°53′48″E
UESS	CYX	Chersky Airport	Chersky	68°44′36″N 161°20′12″E
UEST	IKS	Tiksi Airport	Tiksi	71°41′51″N 128°54′10″E
UESU	ZKP	Zyryanka Airport	Zyryanka	65°44′56″N 150°53′18″E
UEVV	ZIX	Zhigansk Airport	Zhigansk	66°47′48″N 123°21′41″E

== UG - Georgia ==
Also see airport category and list.

ICAO	IATA	Airport name	Community	Coordinates	Notes
UGAM		Ambrolauri Airport	Ambrolauri	42°31′36″N 043°08′07″E	
UGGN		Tsnori Airport	Sighnaghi	41°38′04″N 046°00′46″E	
UGGT		Telavi Aerodrome	Telavi	41°57′12″N 045°30′29″E	
UGKO	KUT	Kutaisi International Airport	Kutaisi	42°10′35″N 042°28′57″E	
UGMM		Mukhrani Airport	Mukhrani	41°55′59″N 044°34′59″E	Closed
UGMS		Queen Tamar Airport	Mestia	43°03′16″N 042°45′00″E	
UGSA		Natakhtari Airfield	Natakhtari	41°55′16″N 044°42′50″E	
UGSB	BUS	Batumi Airport	Batumi	41°36′37″N 041°35′58″E	
UGSS	SUI	Sukhumi Dranda Airport	Sokhumi	42°51′29″N 041°07′41″E	
UGTB	TBS	Tbilisi International Airport	Tbilisi	41°40′09″N 044°57′17″E	

== UH - Russia (Far East) ==
ICAO	IATA	Airport name	Community	Coordinates	Notes
UHBB	BQS	Ignatyevo Airport	Blagoveshchensk	50°25′30″N 127°24′48″E	
UHBP		Ekimchan Airport	Ekimchan	53°04′34″N 132°57′04″E	
UHHH	KHV	Khabarovsk Novy Airport	Khabarovsk	48°31′41″N 135°11′18″E	
UHHO		Troitskoye Aerodrome	Troitskoye	49°26′41″N 136°34′16″E	
UHKK	KXK	Komsomolsk-on-Amur Airport	Komsomolsk-on-Amur	50°24′30″N 136°56′00″E	
UHKM	GVN	Sovetskaya Gavan Maygatka Airport	Sovetskaya Gavan	48°55′30″N 140°02′07″E	
UHMA	DYR	Ugolny Airport	Anadyr	64°44′06″N 177°44′30″E	
UHMD	PVS	Provideniya Bay Airport	Provideniya	64°22′42″N 173°14′36″W	
UHMI		Mys Shmidta Airport	Iultinsky District	68°52′06″N 179°22′32″W	Military
UHMK	KPW	Keperveyem Airport	Keperveyem	67°50′49″N 166°08′20″E	
UHML		Lavrentiya Airport	Lavrentiya	65°34′48″N 170°59′48″W	
UHMM	GDX	Sokol Airport	Magadan	59°54′40″N 150°43′14″E	
UHMN		Omolon Airport	Omolon	65°14′30″N 160°32′21″E	
UHMO	KVM	Markovo Airport	Markovo	64°39′55″N 170°24′51″E	
UHMP	PWE	Pevek Airport	Pevek	69°47′00″N 170°35′48″E	
UHMR		Beringovsky Airport	Beringovsky	63°01′15″N 179°17′36″E	
UHMS		Seymchan Airport	Seymchan	62°55′12″N 152°25′19″E	
UHNN	NLI	Nikolayevsk-on-Amur Airport	Nikolayevsk-on-Amur	53°09′15″N 140°39′04″E	
UHOO	OHO	Okhotsk Airport	Okhotsk	59°24′52″N 143°03′32″E	Also UHOP
UHPD		Ossora Airport	Ossora	59°13′25″N 163°04′13″E	
UHPK		Ust-Kamchatsk Airport	Ust-Kamchatsk	56°14′18″N 162°41′18″E	
UHPM		Milkovo Airport	Milkovo	54°40′42″N 158°32′42″E	
UHPP	PKC	Yelizovo Airport	Petropavlovsk-Kamchatsky	53°10′04″N 158°27′13″E	
UHPU		Ust-Khayryuzovo Aerodrome	Ust-Khayryuzovo	57°05′59″N 156°44′14″E	
UHSB	BVV	Burevestnik Airport	Iturup	44°55′12″N 147°37′18″E	Military
UHSK	EKS	Shakhtyorsk Airport	Shakhtyorsk	49°11′31″N 142°04′54″E	
UHSM	DEE	Yuzhno-Kurilsk Mendeleyevo Airport	Yuzhno-Kurilsk	43°57′40″N 145°41′04″E	
UHSO	ZZO	Zonalnoye Aerodrome	Zonalnoye	50°40′12″N 142°45′36″E	
UHSS	UUS	Yuzhno-Sakhalinsk Airport	Yuzhno-Sakhalinsk	46°53′13″N 142°43′19″E	
UHWW	VVO	Vladivostok International Airport	Vladivostok	43°23′57″N 132°09′05″E	

== UI - Russia (Eastern Siberia) ==
ICAO	IATA	Airport name	Community	Coordinates
UIAA	HTA	Kadala Airport	Chita	52°01′36″N 113°18′18″E
UIBB	BTK	Bratsk Airport	Bratsk	56°22′12″N 101°41′54″E
UIII	IKT	Irkutsk International Airport	Irkutsk	52°16′05″N 104°23′20″E
UINN		Nizhneudinsk Airport	Nizhneudinsk	54°53′24″N 099°03′58″E
UIUU	UUD	Baikal International Airport	Ulan-Ude	51°48′27″N 107°26′25″E

== UK - Ukraine ==
Also see airport category and list.

ICAO	IATA	Airport name	Community	Coordinates	Notes
UKBA		Oleksandriia Air Base	Oleksandriia	48°40′46″N 033°11′07″E	
UKBB	KBP	Boryspil International Airport	Boryspil (near Kyiv)	50°20′41″N 030°53′36″E	
UKBC		Bila Tserkva Air Base	Bila Tserkva	49°47′41″N 030°01′48″E	
UKBD		Kyiv-South Airfield	(near Hrebinky)	50°00′18″N 030°11′50″E	
UKBE		Pekari Heliport	Kaniv	49°41′49″N 031°33′44″E	
UKBF		Konotop Air Base	Konotop	51°14′36″N 033°08′54″E	
UKBH		Korsun-Shevchenkivskyi Airfield	Korsun-Shevchenkivskyi	49°25′30″N 031°13′49″E	
UKBM	MXR	Myrhorod Airport	Myrhorod	49°55′54″N 033°38′22″E	
UKBT		Kanatove Air Base	Kropyvnytskyi	48°33′47″N 032°23′25″E	
UKBW		Buzova Airport	Kyiv	50°23′55″N 030°03′34″E	
UKCC	DOK	Donetsk International Airport	Donetsk	48°04′30″N 037°43′32″E	Destroyed
UKCK	KRQ	Kramatorsk Airport	Kramatorsk	48°42′24″N 037°37′53″E	
UKCM	MPW	Mariupol Airport	Mariupol	47°04′21″N 037°27′23″E	Closed
UKCS	SEV	Sieverodonetsk Airport	Sieverodonetsk	48°54′05″N 038°32′38″E	
UKCW	VSG	Luhansk International Airport	Luhansk	48°25′05″N 039°22′26″E	Destroyed
UKDB	ERD	Berdiansk Airport	Berdiansk	46°48′53″N 036°45′29″E	
UKDD	DNK	Dnipro International Airport	Dnipro	48°21′26″N 035°06′02″E	Destroyed
UKDE	OZH	Zaporizhzhia International Airport	Zaporizhzhia	47°52′01″N 035°18′57″E	Destroyed
UKDM		Melitopol Air Base	Melitopol	46°52′50″N 035°18′08″E	
UKDP		Pidhorodne Airport	Pidhorodne	48°32′48″N 035°06′02″E	
UKDR	KWG	Kryvyi Rih International Airport	Kryvyi Rih	48°02′35″N 033°12′25″E	
UKFB	UKS	Sevastopol International Airport	Sevastopol	44°41′28″N 033°34′36″E	
UKFE		Yevpatoria Airport	Yevpatoria	45°13′32″N 033°22′36″E	
UKFF	SIP	Simferopol International Airport	Simferopol	45°03′08″N 033°58′31″E	
UKFG		Gvardeyskoye Air Base	Hvardiiske	45°06′58″N 033°58′36″E	
UKFI		Saki Air Base	Saky	45°05′35″N 033°35′42″E	
UKFK	KHC	Kerch Airport	Kerch	45°22′21″N 036°24′05″E	
UKFP		Yukharina Balka Airfield	Sevastopol	44°32′56″N 033°29′19″E	
UKFW		Zavodske Airfield	Simferopol	44°55′03″N 034°03′47″E	
UKFY		Dzhankoi Airport	Dzhankoi	45°42′03″N 034°25′02″E	
UKGW		Voroniv Airfield	Rivne	50°41′45″N 026°42′00″E	
UKHH	HRK	Kharkiv International Airport	Kharkiv	49°55′28″N 036°17′24″E	
UKHK	KHU	Kremenchuk Airport	Kremenchuk	49°07′51″N 033°28′31″E	
UKHD		Kharkiv North Airport	Kharkiv	50°01′30″N 036°16′00″E	
UKHL	MIO	Poltava Air Base	Poltava	49°37′38″N 034°29′18″E	
UKHP	PLV	Poltava Airport	Poltava	49°34′26″N 034°23′55″E	
UKHS	UMY	Sumy Airport	Sumy	50°51′30″N 034°45′45″E	
UKHW		Chuhuiv Air Base	Chuhuiv	49°50′18″N 036°38′28″E	
UKIN		Haisyn Airfield	Haisyn	48°49′33″N 029°20′04″E	
UKKA		Uman Air Base	Uman	48°47′41″N 030°12′29″E	
UKKB		Borodianka Airfield	Borodianka	50°39′57″N 029°55′26″E	
UKKE	CKC	Cherkasy Airport	Cherkasy	49°24′15″N 032°00′28″E	
UKKG	KGO	Kropyvnytskyi Airport	Kropyvnytskyi	48°32′41″N 032°16′56″E	
UKKH		Uzyn (Chepelevka) Air base (closed)	Uzyn	49°47′22″N 030°26′10″E	Closed
UKKJ		Kyiv Chaika Airfield	Kyiv	50°25′48″N 030°17′48″E	
UKKK	IEV	Kyiv International Airport	Kyiv	50°24′06″N 030°27′06″E	
UKKL	CEJ	Chernihiv Shestovitsa Airport	Chernihiv	51°24′12″N 031°09′36″E	Closed
UKKM		Hostomel Airport	Hostomel	50°36′13″N 030°11′31″E	
UKKN		Kalynivka Air Base	Kalynivka	49°29′04″N 028°32′22″E	
UKKO		Ozerne Air Base	Zhytomyr	50°09′30″N 028°44′18″E	
UKKP		Chernihiv Air Base	Chernihiv	51°32′55″N 031°18′48″E	
UKKT	NNN	Sviatoshyn Airfield	Kyiv	50°28′42″N 030°23′06″E	
UKKV	ZTR	Zhytomyr Airport	Zhytomyr	50°16′14″N 028°44′19″E	
UKKW		Vasylkiv Air Base	Kyiv	50°14′05″N 030°18′03″E	
UKLA		Novyi Kalyniv Air Base	Kalyniv	49°33′02″N 023°20′03″E	
UKLB		Brody Air Base	Brody	50°07′47″N 025°10′15″E	
UKLC	UCK	Lutsk Airport	Lutsk	50°47′23″N 025°20′56″E	
UKLF		Horodok Northwest Air Base	Horodok	49°49′16″N 023°41′17″E	
UKLH	HMJ	Khmelnytskyi Airport	Khmelnytskyi	49°21′36″N 026°56′00″E	
UKLI	IFO	Ivano-Frankivsk International Airport	Ivano-Frankivs'k	48°53′03″N 024°41′10″E	
UKLL	LWO	Lviv Danylo Halytskyi International Airport	Lviv	49°48′45″N 023°57′22″E	
UKLN	CWC	Chernivtsi Airport	Chernivtsi	48°15′35″N 025°58′54″E	
UKLO		Kornych Air Base	Kolomyia	48°31′48″N 025°07′38″E	
UKLP		Stryi Air Base	Stryi	49°14′40″N 023°47′23″E	Closed
UKLR	RWN	Rivne International Airport	Rivne	50°36′26″N 026°08′30″E	
UKLS		Starokostiantyniv (air base)	Starokostiantyniv	49°44′54″N 027°16′24″E	
UKLT	TNL	Ternopil Airport	Ternopil	49°31′29″N 025°42′07″E	
UKLU	UDJ	Uzhhorod International Airport	Uzhhorod	48°38′03″N 022°15′48″E	
UKMN		Kosino Spa Resort Airfield	Berehove	48°15′11″N 022°29′55″E	
UKNG		Hoholiv Airport	Hoholiv	50°30′55″N 031°02′48″E	
UKNT		Dnipro-1 Heliport	Kyiv	50°26′57″N 030°32′27″E	
UKOG		Genichesk Air Base	Henichesk	46°12′35″N 034°45′39″E	Closed
UKOH	KHE	Kherson International Airport	Kherson	46°40′05″N 032°30′07″E	Destroyed
UKOI		Izmail International Airport	Izmail	45°23′44″N 028°48′05″E	Closed
UKOM		Lymanske Airport	Lymanske	46°40′08″N 030°00′40″E	
UKON	NLV	Mykolaiv Airport	Mykolaiv	47°03′28″N 031°55′11″E	Closed
UKOO	ODS	Odesa International Airport	Odesa	46°25′26″N 030°40′35″E	
UKOR		Kulbakino Air Base	Mykolaiv	46°56′11″N 032°05′55″E	
UKOW		Voznesensk Air Base	Mykolaiv	47°30′42″N 031°15′32″E	
UKRN		Nizhyn Air Base	Nizhyn	51°05′20″N 031°52′08″E	
UKVE		Motor Heliport	Zaporizhzhia	47°51′43″N 035°19′00″E	
UKVN		Nalyvaikivka Airfield	Nalyvaikivka	50°28′45″N 029°44′09″E	
UKWW	VIN	Havryshivka Vinnytsia International Airport	Vinnytsia	49°14′22″N 028°36′50″E	

== UL - Russia (Northwest) ==
ICAO	IATA	Airport name	Community	Coordinates	Notes
ULAA	ARH	Talagi Airport	Arkhangelsk	64°36′00″N 040°43′00″E	
ULAL	LDG	Leshukonskoye Airport	Arkhangelsk	64°53′45″N 045°43′22″E	
ULAM	NNM	Naryan-Mar Airport	Naryan-Mar	67°38′24″N 053°07′30″E	
ULDD	AMV	Amderma Airport	Amderma	69°45′48″N 061°33′48″E	
ULKK	KSZ	Kotlas Airport	Kotlas	61°14′12″N 046°41′48″E	
ULLI	LED	Pulkovo Airport	Saint Petersburg	59°48′01″N 030°15′45″E	
ULMM	MMK	Murmansk Airport	Murmansk	68°47′02″N 032°45′21″E	
ULOL	VLU	Velikiye Luki Airport	Velikiye Luki	56°22′54″N 030°36′36″E	Closed
ULOO	PKV	Princess Olga Pskov International Airport	Pskov	57°47′06″N 028°23′54″E	
ULPB	PES	Petrozavodsk Airport	Besovets	61°53′06″N 034°09′24″E	
ULPP		Peski Airport	Petrozavodsk	61°49′55″N 034°17′44″E	
ULWC	CEE	Cherepovets Airport	Cherepovets	59°16′42″N 038°01′21″E	
ULWW	VGD	Vologda Airport	Vologda	59°16′59″N 039°56′38″E	

== UM - Belarus and Kaliningrad ==
Also see airport category and list.

ICAO	IATA	Airport name	Community	Coordinates	Notes
UMBB	BQT	Brest Airport	Brest	52°06′30″N 023°53′53″E	
UMBK		Borisovo Air Base	Kobryn	52°09′50″N 024°24′00″E	
UMGG	GME	Gomel Airport	Homel	52°31′37″N 031°01′00″E	
UMGI		Rogachev Airport	Rahachow	53°00′53″N 029°52′43″E	
UMII	VTB	Vitebsk Vostochny Airport	Vitebsk	55°07′35″N 030°20′58″E	
UMKK	KGD	Khrabrovo Airport	Kaliningrad	54°53′24″N 020°35′33″E	
UMLI		Machulishchy Air Base	Machulishchy	53°46′24″N 027°34′48″E	
UMMA		Baranovichi (air base)	Baranavichy	53°05′40″N 026°02′45″E	
UMMG	GNA	Hrodna Airport	Obukhovo	53°36′07″N 024°03′13″E	
UMMM	MHP	Minsk-1	Minsk	53°51′52″N 027°32′22″E	
UMMS	MSQ	Minsk National Airport	Minsk	53°52′56″N 028°01′50″E	
UMNB		Babruysk Air Base	Babruysk	53°06′17″N 029°12′21″E	
UMNL		Luninets Air Base	Luninets	52°16′30″N 026°46′30″E	
UMNM		Novo-Pashkovo Airfield	Mogilev	53°56′42″N 030°14′38″E	
UMNV		Pruzhany Air Base	Novyja Zasimavičy	52°35′00″N 024°22′45″E	Closed
UMOO	MVQ	Mahilyow Airport	Mogilev	53°57′17″N 030°05′42″E	

== UN - Russia (Western Siberia) ==
ICAO	IATA	Airport name	Community	Coordinates
UNAA	ABA	Abakan International Airport	Abakan	53°44′36″N 091°23′09″E
UNBB	BAX	Barnaul Airport	Barnaul	53°21′48″N 083°32′30″E
UNEE	KEJ	Kemorovo Airport	Kemerovo	55°16′18″N 086°06′36″E
UNII	EIE	Yeniseysk Airport	Yeniseysk	58°28′24″N 092°06′48″E
UNIT	GOY	Tura Airport	Tura	64°20′00″N 100°25′56″E
UNKL	KJA	Krasnoyarsk International Airport	Krasnoyarsk	56°10′18″N 092°29′36″E
UNKY	KYZ	Kyzyl Airport	Kyzyl	51°40′34″N 094°24′19″E
UNNT	OVB	Novosibirsk Tolmachevo Airport	Novosibirsk	55°00′45″N 082°39′02″E
UNOO	OMS	Omsk Central Airport	Omsk	54°58′00″N 073°18′30″E
UNSS	SWT	Strezhevoy Airport	Strezhevoy	60°42′36″N 077°39′36″E
UNTT	TOF	Tomsk Kamov Airport	Tomsk	56°23′12″N 085°12′38″E
UNWW	NOZ	Spichenkovo Airport	Novokuznetsk	53°48′36″N 086°52′42″E

== UO - Russia (Northern Siberia) ==
ICAO	IATA	Airport name	Community	Coordinates
UODD	DKS	Dikson Airport	Dikson	73°31′00″N 080°22′54″E
UODS		Sredny Ostrov Airfield	Near Severnaya Zemlya	79°31′42″N 091°04′30″E
UOHH	HTG	Khatanga Airport	Khatanga	71°58′06″N 102°29′12″E
UOOO	NSK	Norilsk Airport	Norilsk	69°18′36″N 087°20′00″E
UOTT	THX	Turukhansk Airport	Turukhansk	65°48′00″N 087°55′48″E

== UR - Russia (South) ==
ICAO	IATA	Airport name	Community	Coordinates	Notes
URKA	AAQ	Anapa International Airport	Anapa	45°00′08″N 037°20′50″E	
URKK	KRR	Krasnodar International Airport	Krasnodar	45°02′05″N 039°10′14″E	
URMG	GRV	Kadyrov Grozny International Airport	Grozny	43°23′18″N 045°41′59″E	
URML	MCX	Uytash Airport	Makhachkala	42°49′01″N 047°39′08″E	
URMM	MRV	Mineralnye Vody Airport	Mineralnye Vody	44°13′30″N 043°04′55″E	
URMN	NAL	Nalchik Airport	Nalchik	43°30′48″N 043°38′18″E	
URMO	OGZ	Beslan Airport	Vladikavkaz	43°12′18″N 044°36′24″E	
URMT	STW	Stavropol Shpakovskoye Airport	Stavropol	45°06′36″N 042°06′48″E	
URRP	ROV	Platov Airport	Rostov-on-Don	47°29′38″N 039°55′29″E	
URRR	RVI	Rostov-on-Don Airport	Rostov-on-Don	47°15′30″N 039°49′06″E	Closed
URSS	AER	Sochi International Airport	Sochi	43°27′00″N 039°57′24″E	
URWA	ASF	Narimanovo Airport	Astrakhan	46°17′00″N 048°00′23″E	
URWI	ESL	Elista Airport	Elista	46°22′26″N 044°19′51″E	
URWW	VOG	Volgograd International Airport	Volgograd	48°46′54″N 044°20′48″E	

== US - Russia (Urals) ==
ICAO	IATA	Airport name	Community	Coordinates
USCC	CEK	Kurchatov Chelyabinsk International Airport	Chelyabinsk	55°18′18″N 061°30′18″E
USCM	MQF	Magnitogorsk International Airport	Magnitogorsk	53°23′36″N 058°45′24″E
USDA	SBT	Sabetta International Airport	Sabetta	71°13′09″N 072°03′08″E
USDD	SLY	Salekhard Airport	Salekhard	66°35′21″N 066°35′44″E
USDH		Kharasavey Heliport	Kharasavey gas field	71°13′42″N 066°54′33″E
USDK	YMK	Mys Kamenny Airport	Mys-Kamenny	68°28′04″N 073°35′48″E
USDS	TQL	Tarko-Sale Airport	Tarko-Sale	64°55′50″N 077°48′41″E
USHH	HMA	Khanty-Mansiysk Airport	Khanty-Mansiysk	61°01′42″N 069°05′12″E
USHS	OVS	Sovetsky Airport	Sovetsky	61°19′30″N 063°36′18″E
USHU	URJ	Uray Airport	Uray	60°06′24″N 064°49′34″E
USII	IJK	Izhevsk Airport	Izhevsk	56°50′00″N 053°27′24″E
USKK	KVX	Pobedilovo Airport	Kirov	58°30′12″N 049°20′54″E
USMM	NYM	Nadym Airport	Nadym	65°28′48″N 072°42′12″E
USNN	NJC	Nizhnevartovsk Airport	Nizhnevartovsk	60°57′00″N 076°29′00″E
USPP	PEE	Perm International Airport	Perm	57°54′52″N 056°01′16″E
USRK	KGP	Kogalym International Airport	Kogalym	62°11′24″N 074°32′06″E
USRO	NOJ	Noyabrsk Airport	Noyabrsk	63°11′00″N 075°16′12″E
USRR	SGC	Farman Salmanov Surgut Airport	Surgut	61°20′36″N 073°24′12″E
USSS	SVX	Koltsovo International Airport	Yekaterinburg	56°44′29″N 060°48′13″E
USTR	TJM	Roschino International Airport	Tyumen	57°10′06″N 065°19′00″E
USUU	KRO	Kurgan Airport	Kurgan	55°28′30″N 065°25′00″E

== UT - Tajikistan and Turkmenistan ==
=== Turkmenistan ===
Also see airport category and list.

ICAO	IATA	Airport name	Community	Coordinates
UTAA	ASB	Ashgabat Airport (Ashkhabad Airport)	Ashgabat (Ashkhabad)	37°59′13″N 058°21′39″E
UTAE	KEA	Kerki Airport	Kerki (Atamyrat)	37°49′20″N 065°08′17″E
UTAK	KRW	Turkmenbashi Airport	Turkmenbashi	40°03′48″N 053°00′26″E
UTAM	MYP	Mary Airport	Mary	37°36′24″N 061°54′05″E
UTAN	BKN	Balkanabat International Airport	Jebel	39°40′42″N 054°12′28″E
UTAT	TAZ	Dashoguz Airport	Dashoguz	41°45′53″N 059°49′59″E
UTAV	CRZ	Turkmenabat Airport	Turkmenabat (Chardzhou)	39°05′00″N 063°36′08″E

=== Tajikistan ===
Also see airport category and list.

ICAO	IATA	Airport name	Community	Coordinates
UTDD	DYU	Dushanbe International Airport	Dushanbe	38°32′36″N 068°49′30″E
UTDK		Kulob Airport	Kulyab	37°59′00″N 069°48′00″E
UTDL	LBD	Khujand Airport	Khujand	40°12′55″N 069°41′40″E
UTDT		Bokhtar International Airport	Bokhtar	37°51′44″N 068°51′46″E
UTOD		Khorog Airport	Khorog	37°30′08″N 071°30′48″E

== UU - Russia (Central) ==
ICAO	IATA	Airport name	Community	Coordinates	Notes
UUBC	KLF	Kaluga (Grabtsevo) Airport	Kaluga	54°32′48″N 036°22′08″E	
UUBI	IWA	Ivanovo Yuzhny Airport	Ivanovo	56°56′30″N 040°56′00″E	
UUBP	BZK	Bryansk Airport	Bryansk	53°12′51″N 034°10′35″E	
UUBW	ZIA	Zhukovsky International Airport	Zhukovsky / Moscow	55°33′12″N 038°09′06″E	
UUDD	DME	Moscow Domodedovo Airport	Moscow	55°24′31″N 037°54′22″E	
UUDL	IAR	Golden Ring Yaroslavl International Airport	Yaroslavl	57°33′38″N 040°09′27″E	
UUEE	SVO	Sheremetyevo International Airport	Moscow	55°58′22″N 037°24′53″E	
UUEM	KLD	Migalovo Air Base	Tver	56°49′30″N 035°45′36″E	
UUMB		Kubinka Air Base	Kubinka	55°36′42″N 036°39′00″E	
UUMO	OSF	Ostafyevo International Business Airport	Podolsk	55°30′42″N 037°30′26″E	
UUOB	EGO	Belgorod Airport	Belgorod	50°38′36″N 036°35′24″E	
UUOK	URS	Kursk Vostochny Airport	Kursk	51°45′06″N 036°17′48″E	
UUOL	LPK	Lipetsk Airport	Lipetsk	52°42′12″N 039°32′18″E	
UUOO	VOZ	Voronezh International Airport	Voronezh	51°48′54″N 039°13′48″E	
UUWW	VKO	Vnukovo International Airport	Moscow	55°35′46″N 037°16′03″E	Also UUWI
UUYP	PBX	Pechora Airport	Pechora	65°07′18″N 057°07′48″E	
UUYW	VKT	Vorkuta Airport	Vorkuta	67°29′18″N 063°59′24″E	
UUYX		Ust-Tsilma Airport	Ust-Tsilma	65°26′00″N 052°11′56″E	
UUYY	SCW	Syktyvkar Airport	Syktyvkar	61°39′26″N 050°51′14″E	

== UW - Russia (Volga) ==
ICAO	IATA	Airport name	Community	Coordinates
UWGG	GOJ	Strigino International Airport	Nizhny Novgorod	56°13′48″N 043°47′12″E
UWKB	UUA	Bugulma Airport	Bugulma	54°38′24″N 052°48′06″E
UWKD	KZN	Kazan International Airport	Kazan	55°36′24″N 049°16′54″E
UWKE	NBC	Begishevo Airport	Nizhnekamsk	55°33′48″N 052°05′42″E
UWKS	CSY	Cheboksary International Airport	Cheboksary	56°05′24″N 047°20′50″E
UWLL	ULV	Ulyanovsk Baratayevka Airport	Ulyanovsk	54°16′32″N 048°14′35″E
UWLW	ULY	Ulyanovsk Vostochny Airport	Ulyanovsk	54°23′58″N 048°48′04″E
UWOO	REN	Orenburg Airport	Orenburg	51°47′45″N 055°27′24″E
UWOR	OSW	Orsk Airport	Orsk	51°04′18″N 058°35′48″E
UWPP	PEZ	Penza Airport	Penza	53°06′44″N 045°00′57″E
UWPS	SKX	Saransk Airport	Saransk	54°07′30″N 045°12′54″E
UWSG	GSV	Saratov Gagarin Airport	Saratov	51°42′46″N 046°10′16″E
UWUU	UFA	Ufa International Airport	Ufa	54°33′49″N 055°52′49″E
UWWS		Smyshlyayevka Aerodrome	Samara	53°14′19″N 050°22′41″E
UWWW	KUF	Kurumoch International Airport	Samara	53°30′18″N 050°09′18″E

== UZ - Uzbekistan ==
Also see airport category and list.

ICAO	IATA	Airport name	Community	Coordinates	Notes
UZFA	AZN	Andizhan Airport	Andizhan	40°43′40″N 072°17′38″E	
UZFF	FEG	Fergana International Airport	Fergana	40°21′32″N 071°44′42″E	
UZFN	NMA	Namangan Airport	Namangan	40°59′04″N 071°33′24″E	
UZKK	OQN	Kokand Airport	Kokand	40°26′58″N 070°59′49″E	
UZNM	MOK	Muynak Airport	Moynaq	43°45′19″N 059°01′51″E	
UZNN	NCU	Nukus Airport	Nukus	42°29′18″N 059°37′23″E	
UZNT		Turtkul Airport	Turtkul	41°34′30″N 060°58′00″E	Closed
UZNU	UGC	Urgench Airport	Urgench	41°35′03″N 060°38′30″E	
UZSA	NVI	Navoiy International Airport	Navoiy	40°07′04″N 065°10′30″E	
UZSB	BHK	Bukhara Airport	Bukhara	39°46′30″N 064°29′00″E	
UZSH	RZB	Shakhrisabz Airport	Shakhrisabz	39°01′48″N 066°46′32″E	
UZSK	KSQ	Karshi Airport	Qarshi/Karshi	38°48′14″N 065°46′14″E	
UZSL	KSQ	Karshi-Khanabad Air Base	near Qarshi/Karshi	38°50′01″N 065°55′17″E	
UZSM		Tandy Bulak Airport	Tamdybulak	41°45′44″N 064°36′01″E	
UZSN	AFS	Zarafshan Airport	Zarafshan	41°36′49″N 064°13′58″E	
UZSO		Sokh Airport	Sokh	39°58′08″N 071°07′31″E	
UZSR	IYO	Sariosiyo Airport	Sariosiyo	38°24′38″N 067°56′43″E	
UZSS	SKD	Samarkand Airport	Samarkand	39°42′02″N 066°59′02″E	
UZST	TMJ	Termez Airport	Termez	37°17′12″N 067°18′36″E	
UZSU		Uchkuduk Airport	Uchkuduk	42°04′59″N 063°26′57″E	
UZTC		Chirchik Air Base	Chirchik	41°30′39″N 069°34′33″E	
UZTP	TVT	Tashkent-Humo Airport	Tashkent	41°18′37″N 069°23′33″E	
UZTT	TAS	Tashkent International Airport	Tashkent	41°15′28″N 069°16′52″E	
UZTZ	OMN	Zomin Airport	Zomin	39°58′11″N 068°32′35″E	

== Former Codes ==
The codes below were assigned to airports of Latvia, Lithuania, Estonia and Moldova during Soviet rule. Upon the breakup of Soviet Union, those countries obtained new codes with E or L prefixes. Modern codes of listed airports, if exist, are given in parentheses; the lists are not complete.

=== UK – Moldavian SSR ===
Also see UK – Ukraine section above, for airports in Ukraine

- ~~UKIB~~ – Bălți Airport – Bălți (LUBL)
- ~~UKIE – Tighina Airport~~ – Bender (LUTG)
- ~~UKII~~ – Chișinău Airport – Chișinău (LUKK)
- ~~UKIK – Camenca Airport~~ – Camenca (LUCM)

=== UL – Estonian SSR ===
Also see UL (Northwest) section above, for airports in Russia northeast region

- ~~ULTD~~ – Tartu Airport – Tartu (EETU)
- ~~ULTH~~ – Kärdla Airport – Kärdla (EEKA)
- ~~ULTK~~ – Kuressaare Airport – Kuressaare (EEKE)
- ~~ULTN~~ – Narva Airfield – Narva (EENA)
- ~~ULTP~~ – Pärnu Airport – Pärnu (EEPU)
- ~~ULTT~~ – Tallinn Airport – Tallinn (EETN)
- ~~ULTV~~ – Viljandi Airfield – Viljandi (EEVI)

=== UM – Latvian and Lithuanian SSR ===
Also see UM – Belarus section above, for airports in Belarus or UM (Kaliningrad exclave) section above for Russia's Kaliningrad exclave

==== Latvian SSR ====
- ~~UMRA~~ – Rumbula Air Base – Riga (EVRC)
- ~~UMRD~~ – Daugavpils Air Base – Daugavpils (EVDA)
- ~~UMRE~~ – Rezekne Airport – Rezekne (EVNA)
- ~~UMRG – Ērgļi Airfield~~ – Ērgļi
- ~~UMRI – Preiļi Airfield~~ – Preiļi
- ~~UMRL~~ – Liepāja Airport – Liepāja (EVLA)
- ~~UMRM – Majori Landing Pad~~ – Majori
- ~~UMRR~~ – Riga Airport – Riga (EVRA)
- ~~UMRS~~ – Spilve Airport – Riga (EVRS)
- ~~UMRV~~ – Ventspils Airport – Ventspils (EVVA)

==== Lithuanian SSR ====
- ~~UMWA~~ – Panevėžys Air Base – Panevėžys (EYPP)
- ~~UMWD~~ – Klaipėda Airfield – Klaipėda (EYKL)
- ~~UMWI~~ – Šiauliai Air Base – Šiauliai (EYSA)
- ~~UMWK~~ – Kaunas Airport – Kaunas (EYKA)
- ~~UMWP~~ – Palanga Airport – Palanga (EYPA)
- ~~UMWR~~ – Druskininkai Airfield – Druskininkai (EYDR)
- ~~UMWS – Skaudvilė Airfield~~ – Skaudvilė
- ~~UMWW~~ – Vilnius Airport – Vilnius (EYVI)
