= List of airports in Ukraine =

Topographic map of Ukraine (with borders and towns)

This is a list of airports in Ukraine grouped by type and sorted by location. All aviation infrastructure of Ukraine is being supervised and regulated by the State Aviation Service of Ukraine (until 2010 the State Aviation Administration of Ukraine). The service issues certificates for all airports in the country and keeps a registry of all aircraft.

There are over 20 airports in Ukraine. Due to the 2014 Russian annexation of Crimea and the war in Donbas, Ukrainian aviation authorities were forced to revoke certificates for airports within the area of military operation as there are no positive control over airports in Crimea and eastern Ukraine's Donbas region.

Most airports and aerodromes of Ukraine were originally built for military purposes and some are still being used concurrently by the Ukrainian Armed Forces. Ukraine's central airport in Boryspil shares its airstrip with the Boryspil Air Base. In addition to airports, there are 11 airfields (aerodromes) and some 35 air strips (take off and landing strips) that are being operated separately. More information is available at the State Aviation Administration of Ukraine official website.

The Boryspil International Airport is the country's central and top rated airport. Other top rated airports include Lviv Danylo Halytskyi International Airport, Hostomel Airport (Antonov-1) and Ozerne Airport (near Zhytomyr), the last two being cargo-only airports. Among the busiest airports are Boryspil Airport, Lviv Danylo Halytskyi International Airport, Kyiv International Airport. Before the Russian annexation of Crimea and the outbreak of the war in Donbas there were also Simferopol International Airport and Donetsk International Airport.

On 24 February 2022, Ukraine closed its airspace to civilian flights due to the Russian invasion.

== International airports ==
Airport names shown in bold indicate the airport has scheduled service on commercial airlines. However, since 24 February 2022, scheduled services into Ukraine have been suspended.

City served	Oblast or municipality	ICAO	IATA	Airport name	Usage	Runway(s)	Coordinates
**International airports**
Kyiv	Kyiv (Oblast)	UKBB	KBP	**Boryspil International Airport**	Public/Mil.	18L/36R, 4000m, Concrete; 18R/36L 3500m, Concrete	50°20′41″N 30°53′36″E
Cherkasy	Cherkasy	UKKE	CKC	Cherkasy International Airport	Public	15/33, 2500m, Asphalt	49°24′15″N 32°0′28″E
Chernivtsi	Chernivtsi	UKLN	CWC	**Chernivtsi International Airport**	Public	15/33, 2200m, Asphalt	48°15′35″N 25°58′54″E
Ivano-Frankivsk	Ivano-Frankivsk	UKLI	IFO	**Ivano-Frankivsk International Airport**	Public/Mil.	10/28, 2507m, Concrete	48°53′3″N 24°41′10″E
Kharkiv	Kharkiv	UKHH	HRK	**Kharkiv International Airport**	Public	07/25, 2500m, Concrete	49°55′28″N 36°17′24″E
Kyiv	Kyiv (City)	UKKK	IEV	**Kyiv (Zhuliany) International Airport**	Public/Mil.	8/26, 2315m, Asphalt	50°24′6″N 30°27′6″E
Kryvyi Rih	Dnipropetrovsk	UKDR	KWG	Kryvyi Rih International Airport	Public	18/36, 2500m, Concrete	48°2′35″N 33°12′25″E
Lviv	Lviv	UKLL	LWO	**Lviv Danylo Halytskyi International Airport**	Public/Mil.	13/31, 3305, Concrete	49°48′45″N 23°57′22″E
Odesa	Odesa	UKOO	ODS	**Odesa International Airport**	Public/Mil.	07/25, 553m, Grass; 16/34, 2800m, Concrete	46°25′26″N 30°40′35″E
Rivne	Rivne	UKLR	RWN	Rivne International Airport	Public	12/30, 2626m, Concrete	50°36′26″N 26°8′30″E
Sumy	Sumy	UKHS	UMY	Sumy Airport	Public	08/26, 2500m, Asphalt	50°51′30″N 34°45′45″E
Ternopil	Ternopil	UKLT	TNL	Ternopil International Airport	Public	10/28, 2000m, Concrete; 12/30, 750m, Asphalt	49°31′29″N 25°42′7″E
Uzhhorod	Zakarpattia	UKLU	UDJ	**Uzhhorod International Airport**	Public	10/28, 2038m, Asphalt	48°38′3″N 22°15′48″E
Vinnytsia	Vinnytsia	UKWW	VIN	Vinnytsia Airport (Havryshivka)	Public/Mil.	13/31, 2500m, Concrete	49°14′22″N 28°36′50″E
**International airports with no SAA (Note: State Aviation Administration) certification as of 2017**
Mariupol	Donetsk	UKCM	MPW	Mariupol International Airport (Closed due to war in Donbas)	Public	02/20, 2550m, Asphalt; 02/20, 1400m, Grass; 11/29, 1400m, Grass	47°4′21″N 37°27′23″E
Mykolaiv	Mykolaiv	UKON	NLV	**Mykolaiv International Airport**		05/23, 2572m, Asphalt; 05L/23R, 1800m, Grass	47°3′28″N 31°55′11″E
**Airports destroyed or occupied during Russian invasion**
Sevastopol	Sevastopol	UKFB	UKS	Belbek Sevastopol International Airport (officially closed, de facto operated by Russia)	Public/Mil.	07/25, 3007m, Concrete	44°41′28″N 33°34′36″E
Donetsk	Donetsk	UKCC	DOK	Donetsk International Airport (Destroyed in war in Donbas)	Public	08/26, 4000m, Concrete	48°4′25″N 37°44′23″E
Luhansk	Luhansk	UKCW	VSG	Luhansk International Airport (Destroyed in war in Donbas)	Public	9/27, 2840m, Asphalt	48°25′4.8″N 39°22′26.4″E
Simferopol	Crimea	UKFF	SIP	**Simferopol International Airport** (officially closed, de facto operated by Russia)	Public (now Military)	01L/19R, 3701m, Concrete	45°3′8″N 33°58′31″E
Dnipro	Dnipropetrovsk	UKDD	DNK	**Dnipro International Airport** (destroyed during the 2022 Russian invasion of Ukraine)	Public	9/27, 2850m, Concrete	48°21′26″N 35°6′2″E
Kherson	Kherson	UKOH	KHE	**Kherson International Airport** (destroyed during the 2022 Russian invasion of Ukraine)	Public/Mil.	03/21, 2600m, Asphalt	46°40′5″N 32°30′7″E
Zaporizhzhia	Zaporizhzhia	UKDE	OZH	**Zaporizhzhia International Airport** (Destroyed on 26 May 2024)	Public/Mil.	02/20, 2502m, Concrete	47°52′1″N 35°18′57″E

== Other airports ==
City served	Oblast or municipality	ICAO	IATA	Airport name	Usage	Runway(s)	Coordinates
Berdiansk	Zaporizhzhia	UKDB	ERD	Berdiansk Airport (closed 2004)	Public/Military (since 2016)	09/27, 2500m, Concrete	46°48′53″N 36°45′29″E
Borodianka	Kyiv (Oblast)	UKKB		Borodianka Airfield	Public (sports only)	1400m, Grass	50°39′57″N 29°55′26″E
Chaplynka	Kherson - Kakhovka Raion			Chaplynka airfield (used by Russian military)	Civil/Military	600m, Concrete	46°20′47″N 33°32′31″E
Kyiv	Kyiv (City)	UKKJ*		Chayka Airfield	Public (sports only)	800m, Grass	50°25′52″N 030°18′01″E
Chernihiv	Chernihiv	UKKL	CEJ	Chernihiv Shestovytsia Airport (closed 2005)		09/27, 2200m, Asphalt; 01/19, 600m, Asphalt	51°24′12″N 031°9′36″E
Uzyn	Kyiv	UKKH		Chepelivka Airport		3430m, concrete	49°47′22″N 030°26′10″E
Drabiv	Cherkasy	UKKD*		Drabiv Airport?			
Kyiv	Kyiv (Oblast)	UKBW		Buzova Airport	Public (sports only)	900m, Grass	50°23′55″N 30°3′34″E
Henichesk	Kherson	UKOG		Henichesk Airport (closed)		3000m, Concrete	46°12′35″N 34°45′39″E
Lviv	Lviv			Horodok Air Base	Now civil	1100m, Concrete	49°44′18″N 023°40′6″E
Kyiv (Hostomel)	Kyiv (Oblast)	UKKM	GML	Hostomel Airport (Antonov-2)	Public (cargo only)	15/33, 3500m, Concrete	50°36′13″N 30°11′31″E
Izmail	Odesa	UKOI		Izmail International Airport (closed)	Public	1730m, Concrete	45°23′44″N 028°48′5″E
Kamianets-Podilskyi	Khmelnytskyi		KCP	Kamianets-Podilskyi Airport		600m, Grass	48°41′42″N 026°36′35″E
Kerch	Crimea	UKFK	KHC	Kerch Airport (officially closed, de facto operated by Russia)	Public	07/25, 1652m, Asphalt; 07/25, 2000m, Grass	45°22′21″N 036°24′05″E
Kharkiv	Kharkiv	UKHD		Kharkiv North Airport (Sokolniki)	Public	03/21, 1804m, Concrete	50°1′30″N 36°16′0″E
Khmelnytskyi	Khmelnytskyi	UKLH	HMJ	Khmelnytskyi Airport	Public	16/34, 2220m, Concrete	49°21′36″N 026°56′0″E
Kolomyia	Ivano-Frankivsk	UKLO		Kolomyia Airport		2530, Concrete	48.53000°N 25.12732°E
Kramatorsk	Donetsk	UKCK	KRQ	Kramatorsk Airport	Military	2500m, Concrete	48.70675°N 37.63125°E
Kremenchuk	Poltava	UKHK	KHU	Kremenchuk Airport (Velyka Kokhnivka)	Public	1600m, Grass	49°7′51″N 33°28′31″E
Kropyvnytskyi	Kirovohrad	UKKG	KGO	Kropyvnytskyi Airport	Public	12/30, 1538m, Asphalt; 16/34, 1300m, Asphalt	48°32′41″N 32°16′56″E
Kyiv	Kyiv (City)	UKBD		Kyiv-South Airfield	Public	1, 650m, Asphalt	50°0′13″N 30°11′48″E
Lutsk	Volyn	UKLC	UCK	Lutsk Airport		07/25, 1660m, Asphalt	50.78972°N 25.34880°E
Stryi	Lviv	UKLP		Lviv Stryi Airport	Public/Military	2400m Concrete	49°14′40″N 023°47′23″E
Lymanske	Odesa	UKOM		Lymanske International Airport	Public	18/36, 2503m, Concrete	46°40′8″N 030°0′40″E
Nizhyn	Chernihiv	UKRN		Nizhyn Airport	Emergency services	3000m, Concrete	51.08882°N 31.86890°E
Petrovske	Luhansk	UKHE		Petrovske Airport?			
Pidhorodne	Dnipropetrovsk	UKDP*		Pidhorodne Airport (closed)		500m, Concrete	48°32′48″N 35°06′02″E
Poltava	Poltava	UKHP	PLV	Poltava Airport (Suprunivka)	Public	13/31, 2600m, Concrete	49°34′26″N 34°23′55″E
Semenivka	Chernihiv	UKKS		Semenivka Airport?			
Sieverodonetsk	Luhansk	UKCS	SEV	Sievierodonetsk Airport	Public	1420m, Concrete	48°54′5″N 38°32′38″E
Kyiv	Kyiv (City)	UKKT	NNN	Sviatoshyn Airfield (Antonov-1)	Industrial	14/32, 1800m, Concrete	50°28′42″N 30°23′6″E
Tsuniv	Lviv	UKLF*		Tsuniv Airport	Public	1300m, Grass	49°49′16″N 23°41′17″E
Simferopol	Crimea	UKFW		Zavodskoe Airport (officially closed, de facto operated by Russia)	Public	Grass	44°55′3″N 34°3′47″E
Zhytomyr	Zhytomyr	UKKV	ZTR	Zhytomyr Airport	Public/Industrial	1500m, Asphalt	50°16′14″N 28°44′19″E
Yalta	Crimea			Yalta Heliport (officially closed, de facto operated by Russia)	Public	Concrete	44°29′06″N 34°08′12″E

== Military air bases ==
City served	Oblast or municipality	ICAO	IATA	Airport name	Usage	Runway(s)	Coordinates	Notes
Baherove	Crimea			Baherove Air Base	Military	6/24, 3500m Concrete	45°24′25″N 036°14′41″E	Closed 1996
Bila Tserkva	Kyiv (Oblast)	UKBC*		Bila Tserkva Air Base	Military	Concrete	49°47′41″N 30°1′48″E	Reserve - 1333 Reserve and Scrap Aviation Base
Brody	Lviv	UKLB		Brody Air Base	Military	1967m, Concrete	50.12970°N 25.17075°E	16th Separate Army Aviation Regiment
Chernihiv	Chernihiv Oblast	UKKP		Chernihiv Air Base	Military	2500m, Concrete	51.54852°N 31.31345°E	Closed
Chuhuiv	Kharkiv	UKHW		Chuhuiv Air Base	Military	2500m, Concrete	49.83827°N 36.64115°E	203rd Training Aviation Brigade
Dzhankoi	Crimea	UKFY		Dzhankoi Air Base (officially closed, de facto operated by Russia)	Public/Mil.	05/23, 2500m, Concrete	45°42′03″N 034°25′02″E	Russian 39th Helicopter Regiment
Kalynivka	Vinnytsia	UKKN		Kalynivka Air Base	Military	1860m, Concrete	49°29′04″N 28°32′22″E	Reserve
Kropyvnytskyi	Kirovohrad	UKBT		Kanatove Air Base	Military	2465m, Concrete	48°33′47″N 032°23′25″E	Reserve
Konotop	Sumy	UKBF		Konotop Air Base	Military	2003m, Concrete	51.24305°N 33.14832°E	Reserve
Mykolaiv	Mykolaiv	UKOR		Kulbakino Air Base	Military	3250m, Concrete	46°56.191′N 32°5.924′E	299th Tactical Aviation Brigade
Melitopol	Zaporizhzhia	UKDM	OOX	Melitopol Air Base (officially closed, de facto operated by Russia)	Military	2508m, Concrete	46.88067°N 35.30228°E	25th Transport Aviation Brigade
Myrhorod	Poltava	UKBM	MXR	Myrhorod Air Base	Military	2500m, Concrete	49.93090°N 33.64393°E	831st Tactical Aviation Brigade
Kalyniv	Lviv	UKLA		Novyi Kalyniv Air Base	Military	2217m, Concrete	49.55057°N 23.33405°E	7th Separate Army Aviation Regiment
Oleksandriia	Kirovohrad	UKBA		Oleksandriia Air Base	Military	330m, Concrete	48.67932°N 33.18520°E	Helicopter base
Zhytomyr	Zhytomyr	UKKO		Ozerne Air Base	Public/Mil.	Concrete	50°9′30″N 28°44′18″E	39th Tactical Aviation Brigade
Poltava	Poltava	UKHL	MIO	Poltava Air Base	Military	09/27, 2500m, Concrete; 09/27, 2500m, Grass	49.62722°N 34.48828°E	18th Separate Army Aviation Brigade
Saky	Crimea	UKFI*		Saky Air Base (officially closed, de facto operated by Russia)	Military	Concrete	45°5′35″N 33°35′42″E	Russian 43rd Independent Naval Assault Aviation Regiment
Starokostiantyniv	Khmelnytskyi	UKLS*		Starokostiantyniv Air Base		2400m, Concrete	49°44.894′N 27°16.399′E	7th Tactical Aviation Brigade
Uman	Uman	UKKA		Uman Air Base	Military	2500m, Concrete	48.79485°N 30.20800°E	Reserve
Kyiv	Kyiv (Oblast)	UKKW		Vasylkiv Air Base	Military	2465m, Concrete	50.23468°N 30.30090°E	40th Tactical Aviation Brigade
Mykolaiv	Mykolaiv	UKOW		Voznesensk Air Base	Military	2470m, Concrete	47.51168°N 31.25877°E	Reserve
Yevpatoria	Crimea	UKFE		Yevpatoria Airport (officially closed, de facto operated by Russia)	Military	8/24, 2011m, Concrete	45°13′32″N 33°22′36″E	Repair Plant

== Registered Heliports ==
Heliport	ICAO Code	Location	Coordinates	Size of pad	References
Pekari; Ukrainian: Пекарі	UKBE	Kaniv, Cherkasy Oblast	49°41′49″N 31°33′44″E	30×30m, Concrete	
Dnipro-1; Ukrainian: Дніпро-1	UKNT	Kyiv	50°26′57″N 30°32′27″E	120×50m, Concrete	
Motor; Ukrainian: Мотор	UKVE	Zaporizhzhia, Zaporizhzhia Oblast	47°51′43″N 35°19′0″E	Concrete	
Sopka-1		Novi Petrivtsi, Kyiv Oblast	50°37′17″N 30°27′38″E		
Yarylhach		Chornomorske, Crimea			

== See also ==
- Transport in Ukraine
- List of the busiest airports in Ukraine
- List of the busiest airports in Europe
- List of the busiest airports in the former USSR
- List of airports by ICAO code: U#UK - Ukraine
- Wikipedia: WikiProject Aviation/Airline destination lists: Europe#Ukraine
