= KHU =

KHU or khu may refer to:

- Kyung Hee University, a private research university in South Korea
- KHU, the IATA code for Kremenchuk Airport, Poltava Oblast, Ukraine
- khu, the ISO 639-3 code for Nkumbi language, Angola
