= Borodianka (disambiguation) =

Borodianka is a suburb of Bucha, Kyiv Oblast, Ukraine.

Borodianka or Borodyanka or Borodzianka may also refer to:

== Places ==
- Borodianka Raion, a former raion of Kyiv Oblast, Ukraine
- Borodyanka (4577), an telephone area code in Bucha, Kyiv, Ukraine; see List of dialling codes in Ukraine
- Borodianka (air base), Borodianka, Kyiv, Ukraine; a former Cold War air base
- Borodianka rail station; see List of railway stations in Ukraine

== Other uses ==
- Battle of Borodzianka (1920), during the Polish-Soviet War
- Occupation of Borodianka (2022), during the Russian invasion of Ukraine; see War crimes in the 2022 Russian invasion of Ukraine

== See also ==
- 1995 Borodianka mid-air collision, between an An-70 and An-72 during a flight test
- Flag of Borodianka; see Flags of populated places of Ukraine
