= TNL =

TNL may refer to:

- Lenakel language, spoken in Vanuatu
- National Liberal Youth (Romania) (Romanian: Tineretul Național Liberal), the youth organisation of the National Liberal Party of Romania
- Ternopil Airport, serving Ternopil, Ukraine
- TNL TV, a television channel in Sri Lanka
- Toronto Northern Lights, a Toronto, Ontario-based men's chorus
- Tramway de Nice et du Littoral, a public transportation system in Nice, France
- TNL (political party), a political party in Australia
- The National Lottery, a lottery company in the United Kingdom
- Transform and lighting, a graphics card feature
