= Yanair =

Ukrainian airline

Yanair Янейр

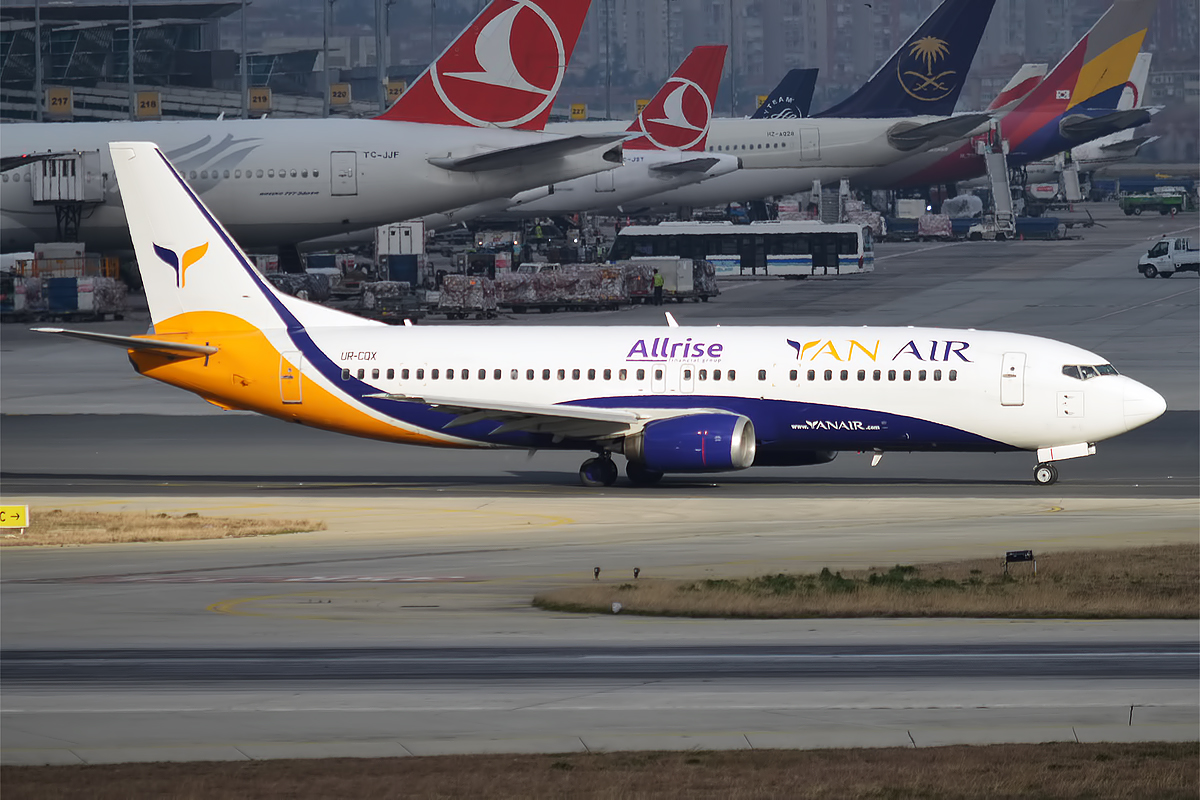
- Yanair Boeing 737-400
IATA	ICAO	Call sign
YE	ANR	YANAIR
- Founded: 2012
- Operating bases: Kyiv International Airport (Zhuliany)
- Fleet size: 1
- Headquarters: Kyiv, Ukraine

Yanair (Ukrainian: Авіакомпанія «ЯнЕйр») is an airline headquartered in Kyiv, Ukraine and based at Kyiv International Airport (Zhuliany). Maintenance for the company's fleet is provided at Zhytomyr Airport.

== History ==
Yanair's Air Operator's Certificate was suspended effective 7 June 2019 by Ukraine's CAA after a comprehensive inspection following an incident on 19 April 2019 involving flight 9U-746 from Istanbul to Chișinău. The airline resumed flights on 18 June 2019 following restoration of its air operator certificate.

== Destinations ==
In June 2018, Yanair served the following scheduled destinations with additional charter services being on offer not shown here.

Armenia

- Yerevan – Zvartnots International Airport

Georgia

- Batumi – Batumi International Airport
- Tbilisi – Tbilisi International Airport

Israel

- Tel Aviv – Ben Gurion International Airport

Poland

- Kraków – John Paul II International Airport Kraków–Balice seasonal

Ukraine

- Kyiv – Kyiv International Airport (Zhuliany) base
- Odesa – Odesa International Airport focus city

As of June 2021, Yanair serves the following scheduled destinations:

Georgia

- Batumi – Batumi International Airport

== Fleet ==
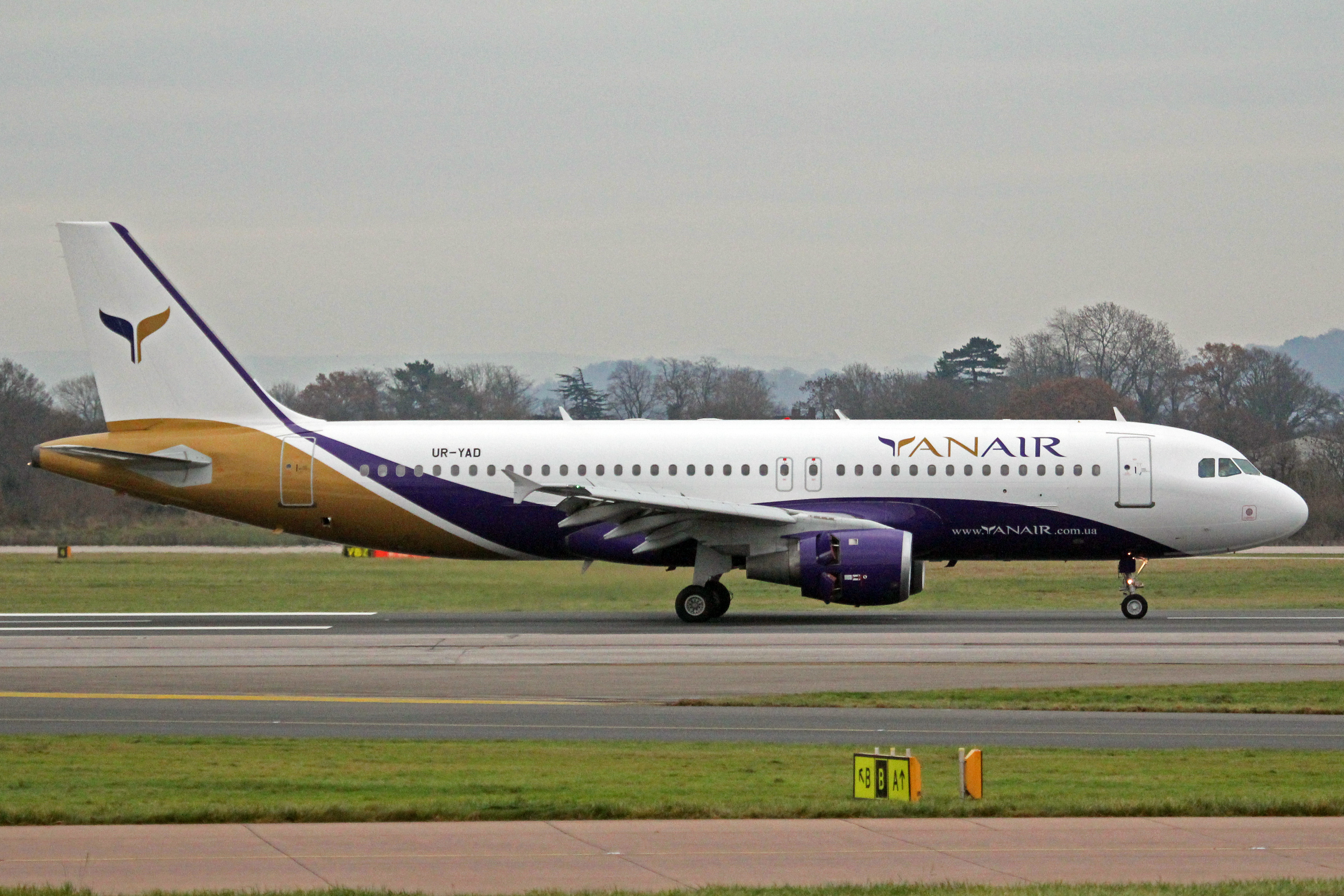
A former Yanair Airbus A320-200

As of July 2026, Yanair operates the following aircraft:

Yanair fleet
Aircraft	In service	Orders	Passengers	Notes
Boeing 737-400	1 (Note: +1 aircraft stored in non operational condition at Zhytomyr International Airport)	—		Wet leased to Mont Gabaon Airlines.
Total	1	—		

Past fleet
Aircraft	Year introduced	Year retired
Airbus A320-200	2013	2016
Airbus A321-100	2017	2019
Boeing 737-300	2015	2022
Boeing 737-500	2019	2020
Saab 340	2013	2017
