= Cherkasy International Airport =

Cherkasy International Airport "Міжнародний аеропорт Черкаси"
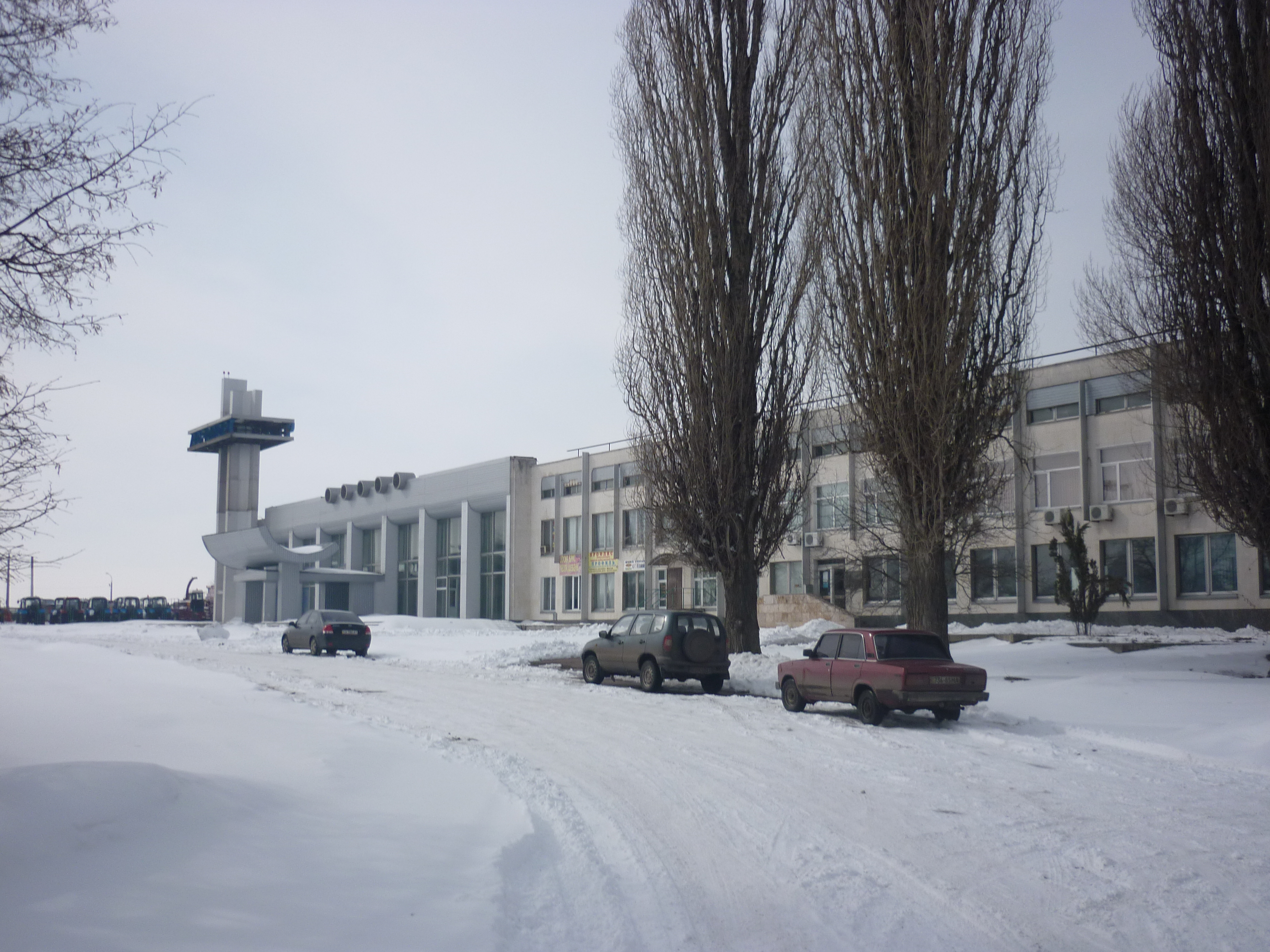
- IATA: CKC; ICAO: UKKE

Summary
- Airport type: Public
- Owner: Cherkassy City Council
- Operator: KP Cherkasy Airport
- Serves: Cherkasy
- Location: Cherkasy, Cherkasy Oblast, Ukraine
- Elevation AMSL: 374 ft / 114 m
- Coordinates: 49°24′56″N 031°59′43″E

Maps
- Location of Cherkasy Airport in Ukraine
- Interactive map of Cherkasy International Airport

Runways
Direction	Length		Surface
Direction	m	ft	Surface
15/33	2,493	8,180	Asphalt concrete

Cherkasy International Airport (Ukrainian: Міжнародний аеропорт "Черкаси") (IATA: CKC, ICAO: UKKE) is located 5.5 km from the city center. The airport is owned by Cherkasy City Council.

== History ==
In 1984, Cherkasy Airport was one of the largest airports in the USSR and had an international status, and received aircraft weighing up to 185.5 tons, serving up to 80 flights a day. After the fall of USSR airport had struggles maintaining airline services, and in 1992 the airport lost its international status and ceased to take international flights. More than 1,500 employees left the workplace, only staff that was serving the charter flight and emergency landings stayed. In 1997 the airport lost most of its charter flights, and was finally closed in 2002 due to economic struggles, and problems with the property.

On 29 March 2007, the work of the airport was renewed. A Cabinet of Ministers of Ukraine has received an application for assignment of the airport's international status. From 2007 to 2009, until the application for international status was in consideration of the Government of Ukraine, the airport has been carefully reconstructed, in particular runway and airport terminal was upgraded significantly. Finally on 22 May 2009, the Cabinet of Ministers of Ukraine appropriated international status to "Cherkasy Airport", allowing the airport for cargo and passenger airlines to make charter, and international flights.

In late 2009, work was in progress on the creation and opening of border crossing points for assigning the status of international airport. Also signed was a cooperation agreement with the Ukrainian airline "Air Urga", which provides air transportation to Western Europe, Commonwealth of Independent States, Syria, Egypt and other countries.

Since 2018, repair work has been ongoing on the reconstruction of the runway, as well as the reconstruction of the passenger terminal. The Ukrainian airline SkyUp is interested in Cherkasy airport in terms of flights to Ukraine and abroad in the future.

== Facilities ==
Cherkasy Airport has the airport complex, which includes: air terminal throughput capacity of 400 passengers per hour, which provides for passage of customs, cargo terminal for storing 1,000 tons of cargo, administration building with dining area, fuel storage, a warehouse for technical equipment and materials, and a building for the aircraft maintenance base.

The airport is Class "B" with an artificial runway with maximum takeoff weight of up to 185.5 tons.

At the moment Cherkasy airport serves only charter flights around Ukraine, the reason being its relative nearness to Boryspil International Airport in Kyiv, which handles most of Ukraine's International flights. In addition, Cherkasy airport is considered as alternative airport for Boryspil in case of unforeseen situations and adverse weather conditions.

== See also ==
- List of airports in Ukraine
- List of the busiest airports in Ukraine
