= Aeroflot Flight N-528 =

1987 aviation accident

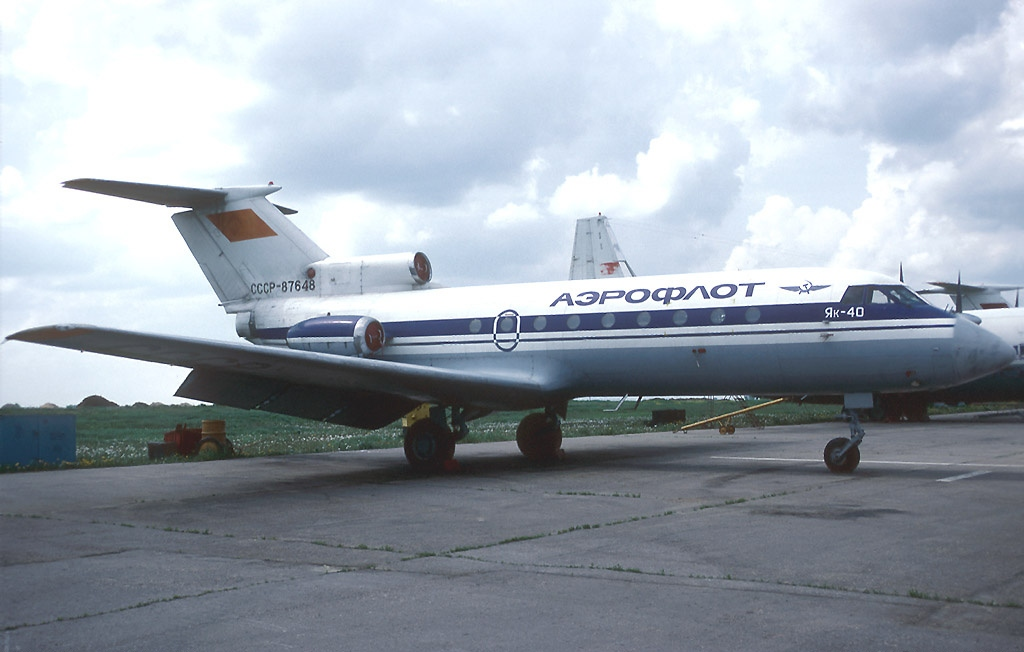
- An Aeroflot Yak-40, similar to the one involved.

Accident
- Date: 19 June 1987
- Summary: Runway overrun on landing, followed by attempted and then aborted go-around, pilot error
- Site: Berdyansk Airport; 46.8144°N 36.7875°E

Aircraft
- Aircraft type: Yakovlev Yak-40
- Operator: Aeroflot
- Registration: CCCP-87826
- Flight origin: Odesa International Airport
- Destination: Berdyansk Airport
- Occupants: 29
- Passengers: 24
- Crew: 5
- Fatalities: 8
- Survivors: 21

Aeroflot Flight N-528 was a regular commercial flight from Odesa to Berdyansk that crashed at 11:22 local time while attempting to land in poor weather conditions.

== Aircraft ==
The aircraft involved in the accident was a Yakovlev Yak-40 registered to Aeroflot. The aircraft rolled off the assembly line at Saratov factory in November 1972 and delivered to Aeroflot's Ukrainian division on 17 November 1972.

== Timeline and summary ==
At the time of takeoff, cumulonimbus clouds were present at 700 metres (2,300 ft), visibility was limited to six kilometres (3.7 mi; 3.2 nmi); wind was 6 km/h (3.2 kn; 3.7 mph) at 20° with gusts up to 14.5 km/h (7.8 kn; 9.0 mph). At 11:16:37 weather observers recommended a storm warning to the manager, to which he said: "busy." In violation of the law, the information was not passed along the chain of command. At 11:16:47 the crew asked the controller about the radar visibility. The manager reported visibility at 2,000 metres (6,600 ft) and stated that they were visible on radar. After receiving this information, the crew decided to go through the system. At 11:18:15 at a distance of 20 kilometres (12 mi; 11 nmi) from the airport, the manager passed the crew go to the dispatcher for landing. At a distance of 15 kilometres (9.3 mi; 8.1 nmi) from the airport at an altitude of 400 metres (1,300 ft), the crew was instructed to take a course of 95° (due to the deviation to the left 300 metres (980 ft)) and were warned about the absence of radar monitoring in the area of 6 kilometres (3.7 mi; 3.2 nmi) of the runway. After receiving this information, the crew decided not to do a go-around. On approach to Berdyansk at 11:20:15, the crew reported entering the glide path at 8,600 metres (28,200 ft), then were instructed to drop 400 metres (1,300 ft). At 11:20:24 they were given permission to land at Berdyansk. At 11:20:25 weather observers at the request of the dispatcher gave weather information about the storm, downpour, windspeed, and visibility. Scud and cumulonimbus clouds were observed at a height of 210 metres (690 ft) and wind was 280° at 8 km/h (4.3 kn; 5.0 mph) with gusts up to 11 kilometres per hour (5.9 kn; 6.8 mph). Visibility was reported to be limited to 500 metres (1,600 ft). At 11:21 the pilot, questioning the visibility of 500 meters, attempted to assess visibility using his instruments, but in violation of flight procedures did not disclose this to the controller.

The plane landed about 5,000 feet (1,500 m) down the 8,200-foot (2,500 m) runway while being too fast on the touchdown, and then hydroplaned. The pilot, not being quite sure about the plane's whereabouts on the runway, then attempted to take off again (while having less than 1,000 feet (300 m) of runway remaining), rolled off the departure end of the runway, and aborted the take-off attempt. The plane hit several trees, broke apart, then caught fire. Five passengers died at the scene, with one more passenger and two flight attendants dying later from their injuries.

== Causes ==
Cited among the multiple causes of the crash was the decision to land at Berdyansk Airport despite the weather conditions and poor visibility. The committee also cited poor human resource management at the control tower and weather station. The lack of accurate weather data given to the crew was cited as a contributing factor.

== See also ==
- Aeroflot accidents and incidents
- Aeroflot accidents and incidents in the 1980s
- China Airlines Flight 140, an Airbus A300 that crashed during an attempted go around due to pilot errors.
