= Poltava International Airport =

Airport in Poltava Oblast, Ukraine

Poltava International Airport Аеропорт «Полтава»
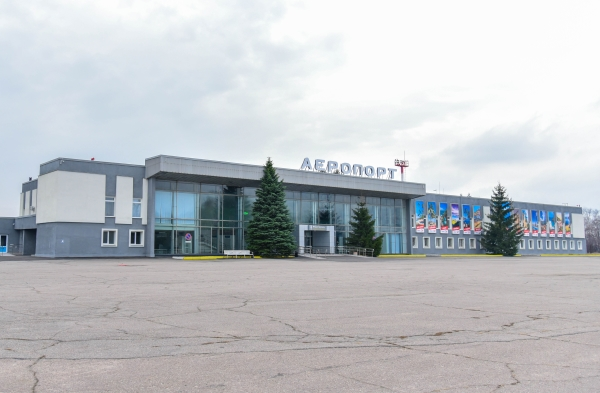
- IATA: PLV; ICAO: UKHP

Summary
- Airport type: Public
- Serves: Poltava
- Location: Suprunivka, Poltava Oblast, Ukraine
- Coordinates: 49°34′26″N 034°23′55″E

Maps
- Location of Poltava International Airport in Ukraine
- Interactive map of Poltava International Airport

Runways
Direction	Length		Surface
Direction	m	ft	Surface
09/27	2,600	8,530	Concrete

Poltava International Airport (Ukrainian: Аеропорт «Полтава» (Супрунівка)) (IATA: PLV, ICAO: UKHP) is a public airport located approximately 7 kilometres (4.3 mi) west of Poltava, Ukraine. It is one of two airfields near Poltava, the other being Poltava Airbase. The airport is located near the villages Ivashky (Ukrainian: Івашки) and Suprunivka (Ukrainian: Супрунівка). Since 2020 the airport is closed due to reconstruction.

== History ==
Built in 1924, Poltava International airport was once able to process 200 passengers per hour. It took 2 years to build a new terminal, which was opened in 1974. In its best times from 40 to 60 planes used to land here. Back then it employed around 900 people.

== Airlines and destinations ==
Since 2020 the airport is closed due to reconstruction.

== See also ==
- List of airports in Ukraine
- List of the busiest airports in Ukraine
