= Khmelnytskyi Airport =

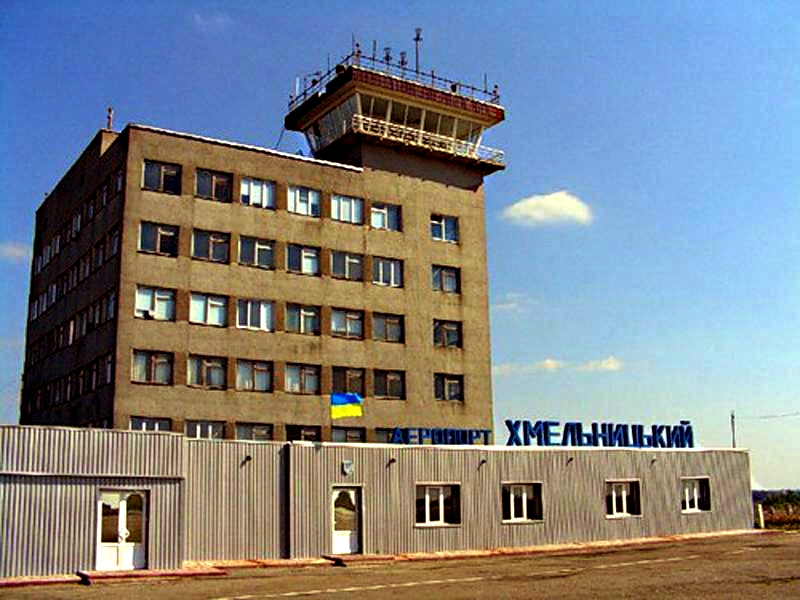
- Passenger terminal
- IATA: HMJ; ICAO: UKLH

Summary
- Airport type: Public
- Owner: Khmelnytskyi City Council
- Operator: KP Khmelnytskyi Airport
- Serves: Khmelnytskyi
- Location: Khmelnytskyi, Khmelnytskyi Oblast, Ukraine
- Elevation AMSL: 1,152 ft / 351 m
- Coordinates: 49°21′36″N 026°56′0″E
- Website: www.podilliaavia.com.ua

Maps
- Location of Khmelnytskyi Airport in Ukraine
- Interactive map of Khmelnytskyi Airport

Runways
Direction	Length		Surface
Direction	ft	m	Surface
16/34		1,230	Concrete

Khmelnytskyi Airport (Міжнародний аеропорт "Хмельницький) (IATA: HMJ, ICAO: UKLH) is an airport in Ukraine located 7 km southwest of Khmelnytskyi. It services general aviation.

== See also ==
- List of airports in Ukraine
- List of the busiest airports in Ukraine
