= Berdiansk Airport =

Airport in Berdiansk, Ukraine

Berdiansk Airport "Бердянськ Аеропорт"
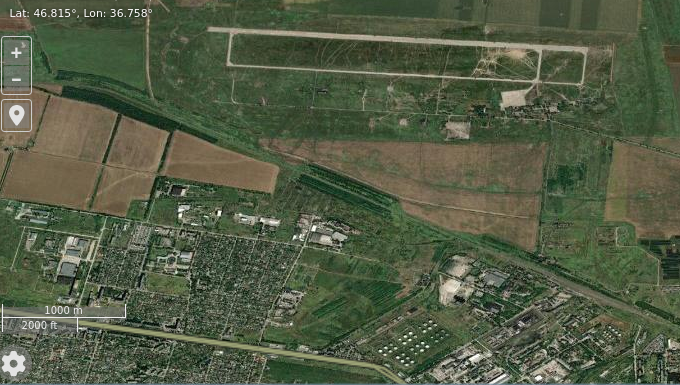
- Satellite imagery of Berdiansk airport
- IATA: ERD; ICAO: UKDB

Summary
- Airport type: Public/Military
- Location: Berdiansk, Ukraine
- Elevation AMSL: 171 ft / 52 m
- Coordinates: 46°48′53″N 36°45′29″E

Maps
- Location of Berdiansk Airport in Ukraine ERD (Zaporizhzhia Oblast)
- Interactive map of Berdiansk Airport

Runways
Direction	Length		Surface
Direction	m	ft	Surface
09/27	2,500	8,202	Concrete

Berdiansk Airport (Ukrainian: Аеропорт Бердянськ, Russian: Аэропорт Бердянск) (IATA: ERD, ICAO: UKDB) is an airport in Berdiansk, Ukraine. The airport is located 1.5 km (0.9 mi) north of the city.

== History ==
The airport is a former Soviet airbase and was home to the:

- 292nd Independent Helicopter Squadron for Electronic Warfare between 1979 and 1981 with the Mil Mi-8
- 336th Independent Helicopter Regiment in 1978-79 with the Mil Mi-8 before being moved to join the Group of Soviet Forces in Germany.
- 29th Instructor Bomber Aviation Regiment (previously called the 29th Independent Training Aviation Regiment) between 1979 and 1992 with the Sukhoi Su-17, Mikoyan-Gurevich MiG-21 and Sukhoi Su-24
- 163rd Training Aviation Regiment between 1971 and 1977 with the Beriev Be-12, part of the Voroshilovgrad Higher Military Aviation School of Navigators.

As of 26 February 2022, the airport is under Russian occupation. The airport has been used by the Russian Armed Forces ever since being taken.

On October 17, 2023, as part of Operation Dragonfly, the Ukrainian Armed Forces struck logistical points that the Russian military used. It mainly targeted the Luhansk International Airport in the east and Berdiansk Airport in the south. During the operation, the Ukrainians used U.S.-supplied MGM-140 ATACMS tactical ballistic missiles, which led to the heavy losses of helicopters of the Russian Air Force. The Ukrainians also succeeded in destroying the airport runways, numerous supply depots, and even some air defense systems. The Ukrainians also claimed to have caused manpower losses, but it cannot be confirmed.

Reportedly the attack destroyed nine Russian helicopters, an antiaircraft missile launcher, an ammunition warehouse and various special equipment.

As of 2024 Google Maps satellite imagery indicates that runway 09/27 is unusable and that no aircraft is present.

== Incidents and accidents ==
- On 19 June 1987, Aeroflot Flight 528, a Yakovlev Yak-40 (CCCP-87826) approached the airport with a tailwind in a heavy rain shower and touched down at high speed. A go-around was initiated, then aborted. The aircraft overran the runway, struck obstacles and caught fire, killing eight aboard. The aircraft was written off.
- On 24 March 2022, Ukrainian forces struck the occupied airfield using OTR-21 Tochka ballistic missiles, which allegedly destroyed four Russian military aircraft (Two Su-30SM fighter jets, One Su-25 attack jet, One Il-76 transport aircraft)
- On 17 October 2023, the Ukrainian Armed Forces conducted a special operation and targeted the airport with a salvo of MGM-140 ATACMS rockets, which left multiple Russian helicopters and a nearby ammunition warehouse destroyed.

== See also ==
- List of airports in Ukraine
