= Nizhneudinsk Airport =

Nizhneudinsk Airport Аэропорт «Нижнеудинск»
- IATA: none; ICAO: UINN (УИНН)

Summary
- Airport type: Public
- Serves: Nizhneudinsk
- Location: Russia, Irkutsk Oblast, Nizhneudinsk
- Elevation AMSL: 1,339 ft / 408 m
- Coordinates: 54°53′38″N 99°4′11″E

Map

Runways
Direction	Length		Surface
Direction	ft	m	Surface
13/31		1,150

Nizhneudinsk Airport (Russian: Аэропорт «Нижнеудинск») (ICAO: UINN) is a regional airport located on the south-east of Nizhneudinsk in the Irkutsk Oblast.

== Passenger ==
Airlines	Destinations
PANH	Irkutsk, Ulan-Ude
