= Yevpatoria Airport =

Yevpatoria aircraft repair plant Evpatoria Aviation Repair Plant Євпаторійський авіаційний ремонтний завод
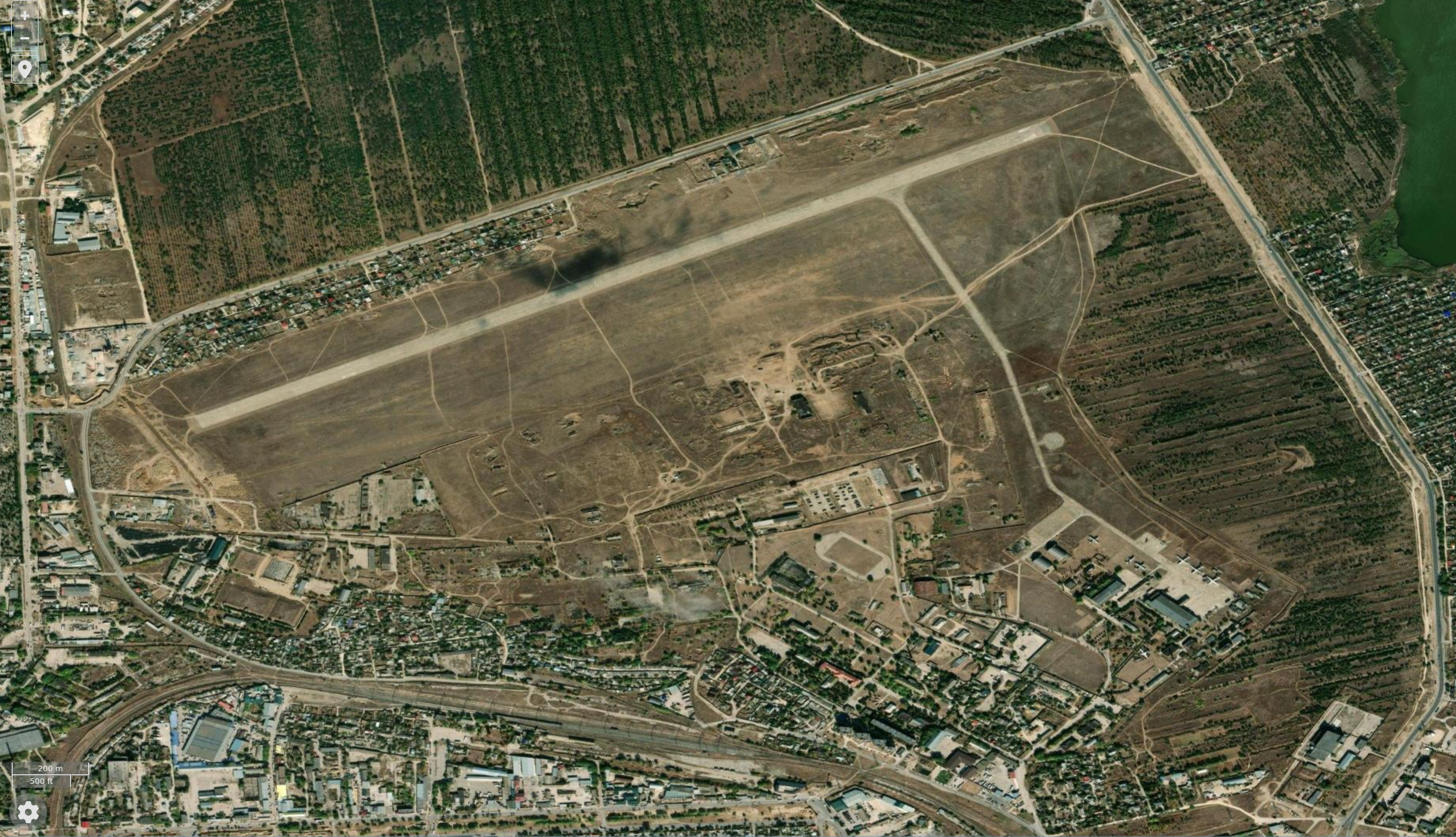
- Satellite imagery of Yevpatoria Airport
- IATA: none; ICAO: UKFE

Summary
- Airport type: Military
- Location: Yevpatoria, Crimea
- Elevation AMSL: 33 ft / 10 m
- Coordinates: 45°13′32″N 33°22′36″E
- Website: http://www.earz.narod.ru/main.html

Map
- Location of Yevpatoria Airport in Crimea

Runways
Direction	Length		Surface
Direction	ft	m	Surface
06/24	6,600	2,011	Concrete

Yevpatoria Airport "Yevpatoria aircraft repair plant" (Ukrainian: Євпаторійський авіаційний ремонтний завод, Russian: Евпаторийский авиационный ремонтный завод) (ICAO: UKFE) is an airport in Yevpatoria, Crimea. The airport is located just east of the city.

== Military use ==
The airport has been used by the:

- 53rd Fighter Aviation Regiment PVO between 1952 and 1960.
- 355th Fighter Aviation Regiment PVO between 1954 and 1958.
- 925th Fighter Aviation Regiment PVO between 1954 and 1960.

== History and development ==
The State enterprise of the Ministry of Defense of Ukraine "Evpatoria aircraft repair plant" (Also known as EARZ) was founded on November 25, 1939 (took roots in 1926). On November 12, 1991 passenger aircraft Yak-42 landed at the aerodrome "Evpatoria". From that moment the plant became the first military enterprise that was allowed to repair civil aircraft.

The plant has relations with India, Angola, Bulgaria, Mexico, Columbia and various air companies of the world.

Since 1995 the plant has maintained relations with the Antonov Design Bureau. One result of such a cooperation was mastering of An-12 maintenance by EARZ specialists. Then, in 1999, the plant began the mastering of periodic maintenance and works on maintenance certification of aircraft An-24, An-26 and An-32. Volume of production in 1999 increased in comparison with 1998 by 3.2 times.

Evpatoria aircraft repair plant has appropriate certificates for performing works on civil aircraft.

In 2002 Quality Management System was applied on the plant in accordance with national and international standards ISO 9000, AS 9000, national and international Aviation Regulations.

=== Plans ===
To implement the General Plan of city of Evpatoria, as well as the Strategic Plan for Economic and Social Development of Evpatoria for the period up to 2015, state-owned enterprise of the Ministry of Defence of Ukraine Evpatoria aircraft repair plant in conjunction with the Directorate of Investment Policy and Foreign Economic Relations of Evpatoria city council developed the concept of business project plan to build in Evpatoria Airport.

Executive Committee in accordance with the decision of the City Council sent a letter to the Minister of Defence with the request to transfer to communal ownership of the territorial community of the city of Evpatoria runway with the adjacent military airfield taxiway grade 2.

The aim of this project is to create high-tech enterprise, which in the long term can serve multimodule passenger and freight node Western Crimea.

== See also ==
- List of airports in Ukraine
- Yevpatoria
- Євпаторійський авіаційний ремонтний завод
