= Zhytomyr International Airport =

- IATA: ZTR; ICAO: UKKV

Summary
- Airport type: Public
- Serves: Zhytomyr
- Location: Zhytomyr, Zhytomyr Oblast, Ukraine
- Hub for: Yanair
- Coordinates: 50°16′14″N 28°44′19″E
- Website: ztr.zt.ua

Maps
- Location of Zhytomyr Airport in Ukraine UKKV (Ukraine)
- Interactive map of Zhytomyr International Airport

Runways
Direction	Length		Surface
Direction	ft	m	Surface
13/31	5,413	1,650	Asphalt, 20/f/d/y/t

Zhytomyr International Airport (Ukrainian: Міжнародний аеропорт «Житомир») (IATA: ZTR, ICAO: UKKV) is an airport in Zhytomyr, Ukraine.

== History ==
The airport started operating in 1939. But in November 2011, it was stripped from its registration as civil airport because it had not received any airplanes since 1990. On 30 December 2015, the airport again received an airport certificate and reopened on 29 January 2016, with the (technical) flight of a Saab 340. Maintenance for the fleet of Yanair is provided at Zhytomyr Airport.

On 30 June 2021 the Cabinet of Ministers of Ukraine adopted an order to open a border checkpoint at Zhytomyr Airport, to allow it to accept international flights. The following August 12 the checkpoint registered its first plane; an airplane from the United States with two citizens of Ukraine on board.

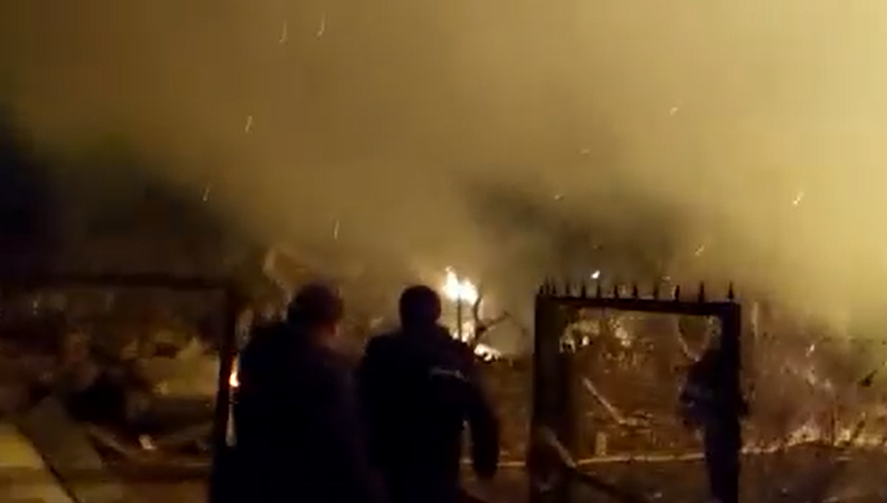
Zhytomyr Airport attack, 27 February 2022

On 27 February 2022, during the Russian invasion of Ukraine, Zhytomyr Airport was hit by 2 Iskander missiles launched from Belarus.

== See also ==
- List of airports in Ukraine
- List of the busiest airports in Ukraine
