= Zavodske Airport =

Zavodske Airport Аеропорт "Заводське" Аэропорт "Заводское"
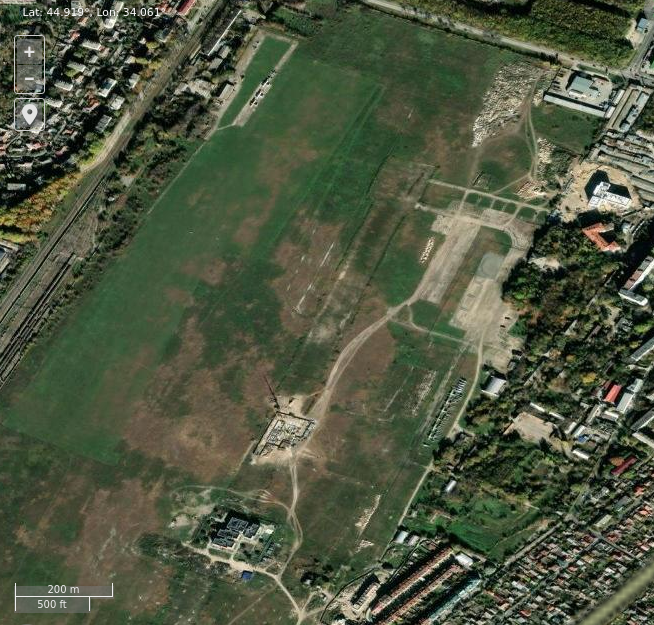
- Satellite imagery of Zavodske Airport
- IATA: none; ICAO: UKFW

Summary
- Airport type: Public
- Owner/Operator: "Universal-Avia" (Crimea state aviation enterprise)
- Serves: Simferopol, Crimea
- Elevation AMSL: 291 m / 955 ft
- Coordinates: 44°55′08″N 34°3′40″E
- Interactive map of Zavodske Airport

Runways
Direction	Length		Surface
Direction	m	ft	Surface
1	1,200	3,937	Grass
2	1,800	5,906	Grass
3	1,200	3,937	Grass

Helipads
Number	Length		Surface
Number	m	ft	Surface
5 helipads			Asphalt

Zavodske Airport (Ukrainian: Аеропорт "Заводське"; Russian: Аэропорт "Заводское") (ICAO: UKFW) is located 5 kilometres (2.7 NM) southwest of Simferopol, the capital of the Autonomous Republic of Crimea. Established in 1914 as part of the aircraft factory "Anatra," it is classified as a Class D unpaved airdrome and operates during daylight hours.

== History ==
Zavodske Airport has a rich history, tracing its origins back to the Soviet Union era. During this time, it housed an airline club and a school for civil pilots, with many graduates being honored as Heroes of the Soviet Union.

In March 1941, an aviation enterprise was inaugurated to perform specialized types of aviation works. Until the 1990s, the airport facilitated scheduled air transportation of passengers and cargo within Crimea and its neighboring areas.

During Ukraine's independence, "Universal-Avia," the primary enterprise operating at the airport, engaged in United Nations and NATO contracts, operating extensively in Central Africa and Asia. The skilled engineers and technicians at the airport, proficient in various aircraft maintenance tasks, have experience working globally, capable of performing any type of maintenance without requiring an inspector's check or presence. Numerous specialists are authorized to maintain Mil helicopters including models Mi-8AMT, Mi-17, Mi-171, Mi-172, and Mi-26.

The airport currently offers sightseeing flights to various tourist destinations within Crimea.

During the annexation of Crimea by the Russian Federation, the airport hosted military helicopters.

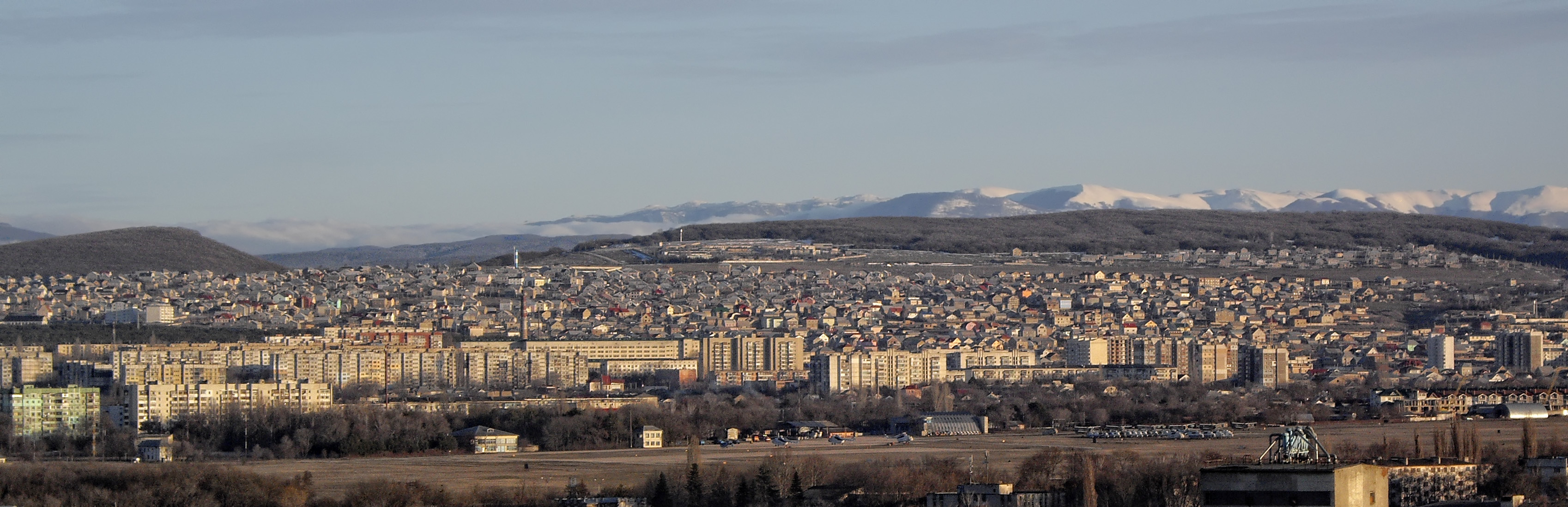

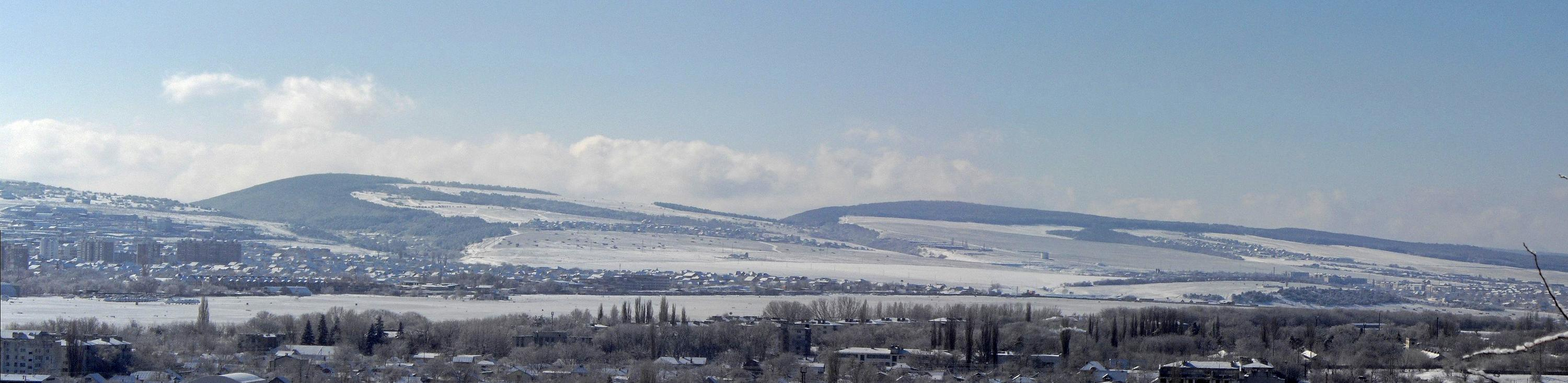
Zavodskoye airfield, south-west of Simferopol, Crimea

== See also ==
- List of airports in Ukraine
