= State Aviation Administration of Ukraine =

Ukrainian civil aviation agency

- Agency emblem

Agency overview
- Formed: November 2, 2006
- Jurisdiction: Ukraine, Kyiv
- Agency executive: Oleksandr Bilchuk
- Parent agency: Ukrainian Ministry of Infrastructure
- Website: Official website

The State Aviation Administration of Ukraine (Ukrainian: Державна авіаційна служба України, romanized: Derzhavna aviatsiina sluzhba Ukrainy) is an agency of the Ukrainian government under the Ministry of Infrastructure responsible for civil aviation.

The head office is in Kyiv (14 Peremogy Avenue, Kyiv, 01135, Ukraine).

== See also ==
- Ukraine National Bureau for Civilian Aircraft Events and Accidents Investigations
- List of airports in Ukraine
