= Izmail International Airport =

Izmail Airport Аеропорт «Ізмаїл»
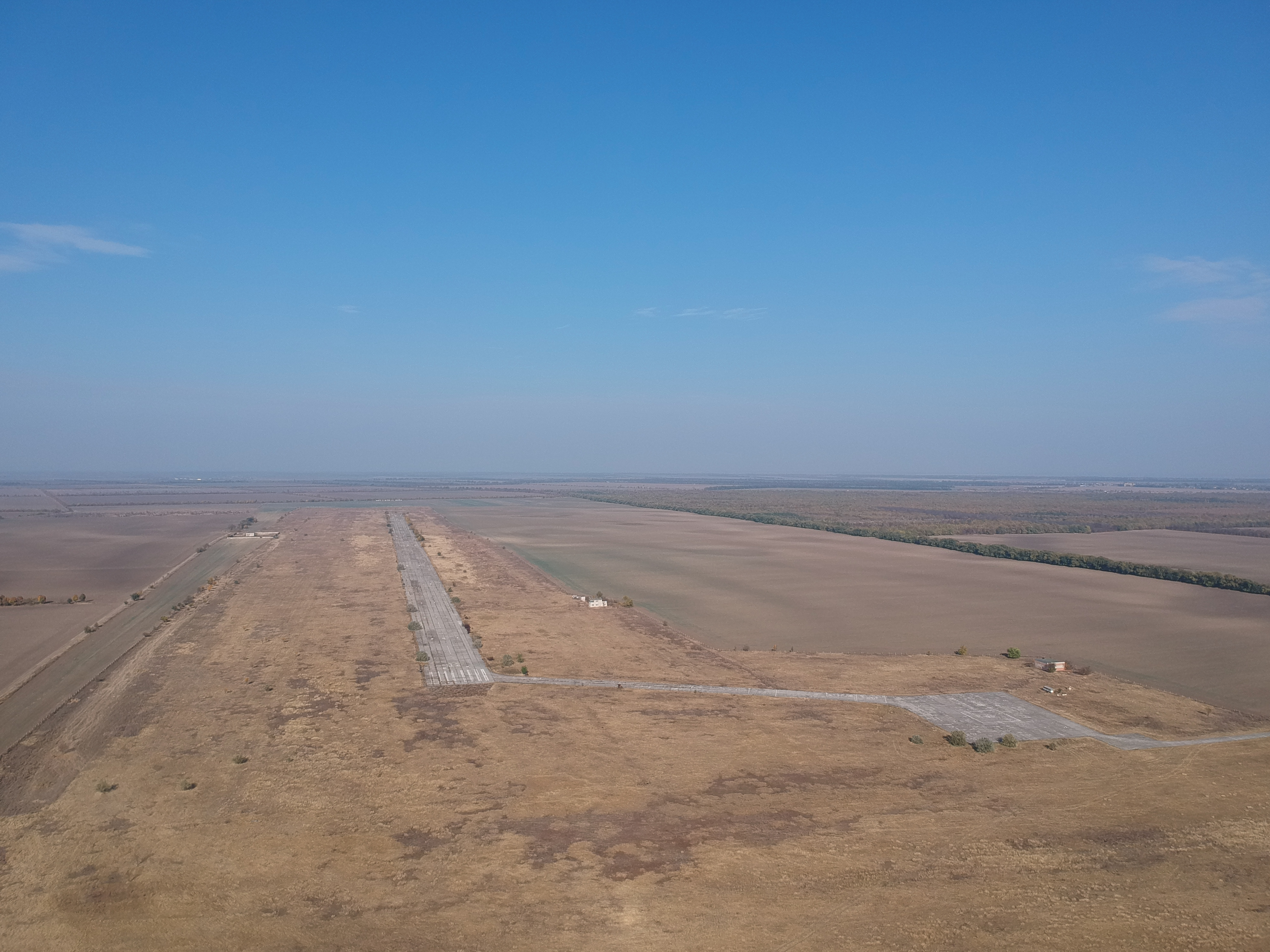
- IATA: IZL; ICAO: UKOI

Summary
- Airport type: Public/military
- Serves: Izmail
- Location: Odesa Oblast, Ukraine
- Coordinates: 45°23′44″N 028°48′5″E

Maps
- Location of Izmail Airport in Ukraine
- Interactive map of Izmail Airport

Runways
Direction	Length		Surface
Direction	ft	m	Surface
02/20	5,906	1,800	Concrete

Izmail Airport (Ukrainian: Аеропорт «Ізмаїл») (ICAO: UKOI) is a closed airport in the Odesa Oblast, Ukraine. It is located 4.5 km North of the city of Izmail. The airport operated from 2007 to 2009, but was closed and has not renewed its certification with the State Aviation Administration of Ukraine since being suspended for three years in 2010.
