= Chernihiv Shestovytsia Airport =

Airport in Chernihiv, Ukraine

Chernihiv Airport
- IATA: CEJ; ICAO: UKKL

Summary
- Airport type: Public
- Location: Chernihiv
- Elevation AMSL: 446 ft (136 m)
- Coordinates: 51°24′12″N 031°9′36″E

Maps
- Location in Ukraine UKKL (Ukraine)
- Interactive map of Chernihiv Airport

Runways
Direction	Length		Surface
Direction	ft	m	Surface
09/27	7,218	2,200	Asphalt

Chernihiv Airport (also given as Chernihiv Shestovytsia) (IATA: CEJ, ICAO: UKKL) is an airport in Ukraine located 15 km southwest of Chernihiv. Previously it had ICAO code UKRR. Parts of the 2017 Ukrainian blockbuster Cyborgs: Heroes Never Die were shot in the airport.

== History ==
The airport was built in the 80s, near the village of Shestovytsia. Shestovitsa Airport was a modern facility with a solid runway sandwiched between two main roads; in addition, there was also a modern airport terminal, which in times of prosperity was used only at half its capacity. After the collapse of the USSR and the Chernihiv's airport started to deteriorate.

Until 1994, the airport had domestic flights to Lviv, Odessa, Donetsk and Crimea, as well as international flights to Moscow, Tula and Minsk.

Unfortunately, the airport has been closed betwee 2002 and 2003. The staff was fired, the planes were sold and the premises began to be rented. Some buildings and runways have been demolished. There is still a checkpoint of the state enterprise Ukraerorukh, which serves the air corridors.

During the full-scale war of Russia against Ukraine, which began on February 24, 2022. During the offensive of Russian troops, the Chernihiv region became a constant target for bombing. The airport building was destroyed, and with it six of the eight unique mosaic panels.

== Gallery ==
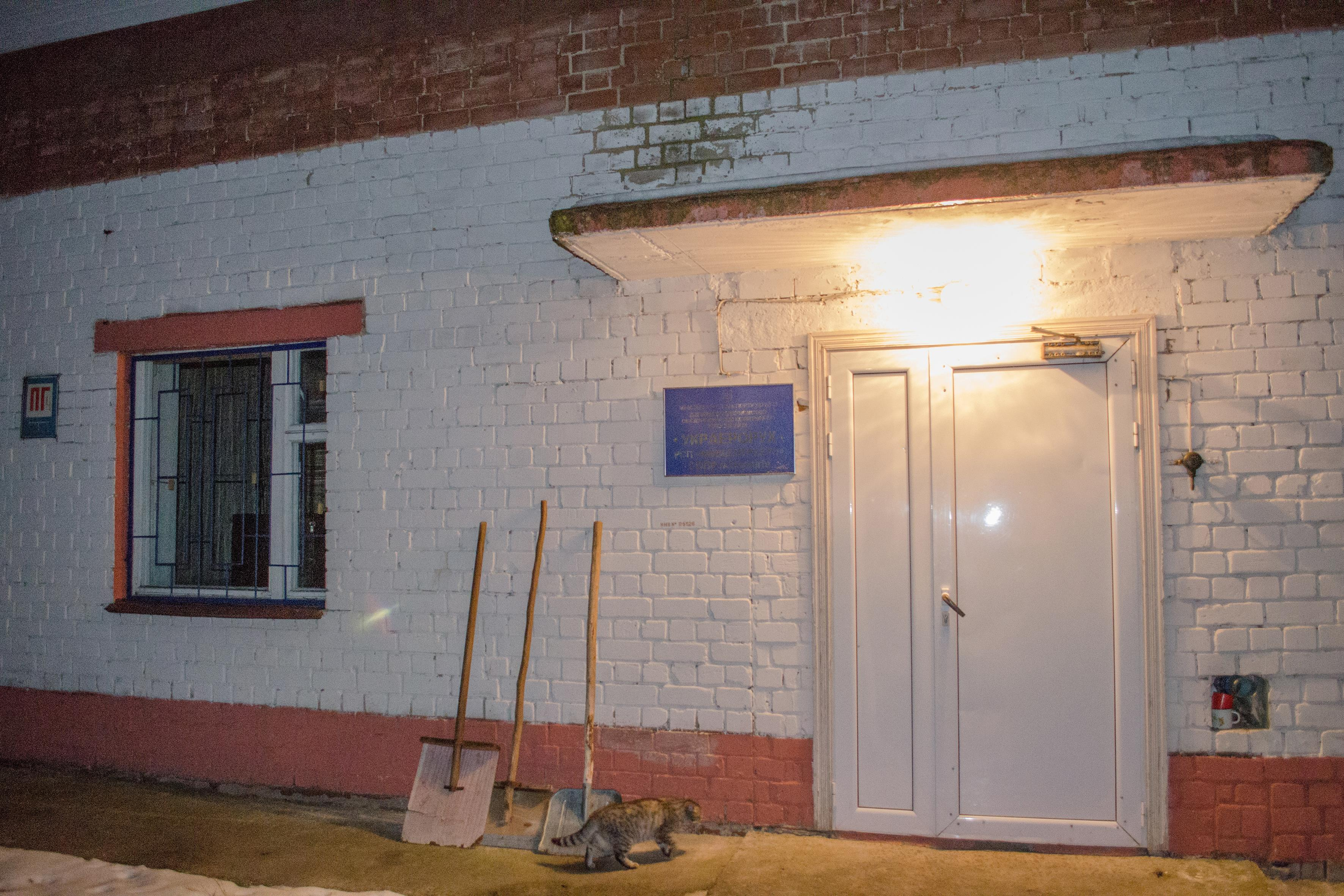

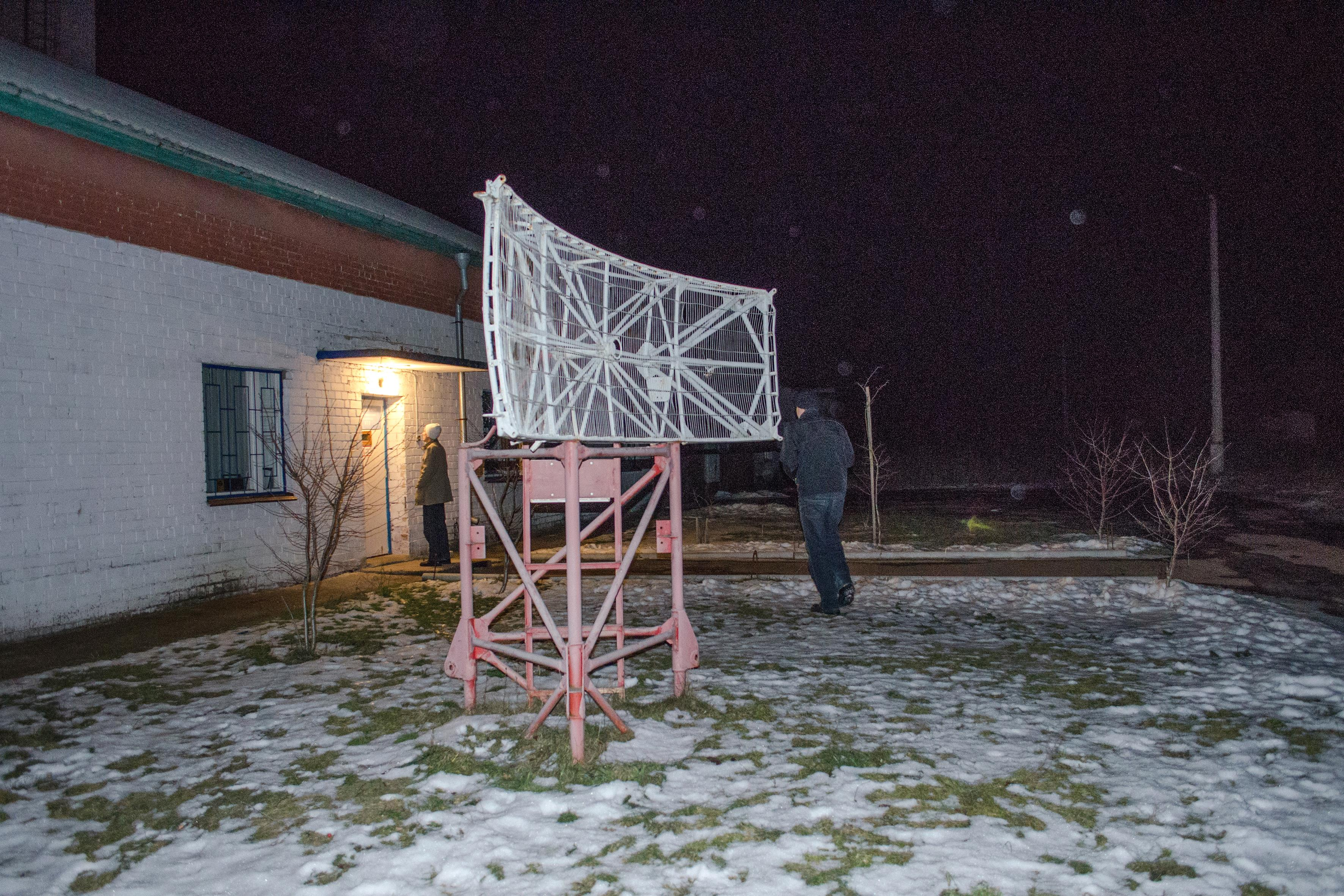

== See also ==
- List of airports in Ukraine
