= Kharkiv North Airport =

Kharkiv North
- IATA: none; ICAO: UKHV

Summary
- Airport type: Public
- Location: Kharkiv
- Elevation AMSL: 591 ft / 180 m
- Coordinates: 50°1′30″N 036°16′0″E

Maps
- Interactive map of Kharkiv North

Runways
Direction	Length		Surface
Direction	ft	m	Surface
03/21	5,919	1,804	Concrete

Kharkiv North Airport (ICAO: UKHV), also known as Kharkiv Sokilnyky Airport, is an airport in Ukraine located 4 km north of Kharkiv. It is owned by the Kharkiv State Aircraft Manufacturing Company. Early Tupolev jetliners were built here, and later the Antonov An-72 and An-74.
