= Lutsk Airport =

Airport

- IATA: UCK; ICAO: UKLC

Summary
- Airport type: Public
- Location: Lutsk
- Elevation AMSL: 774 ft / 236 m
- Coordinates: 50°41′0″N 025°29′0″E
- Interactive map of Lutsk Airport

Runways
Direction	Length		Surface
Direction	ft	m	Surface
07/25	5,446	1,660	Asphalt

Lutsk Airport (also given as Lutsk Southeast) (IATA: UCK, ICAO: UKLC) is a functioning airport in Volyn Oblast, Ukraine located 14 km southeast of Lutsk. Built in 1986. Out of military commission from 1996.
