= Ternopil Airport =

Ternopil Airport Аеропорт Тернопіль
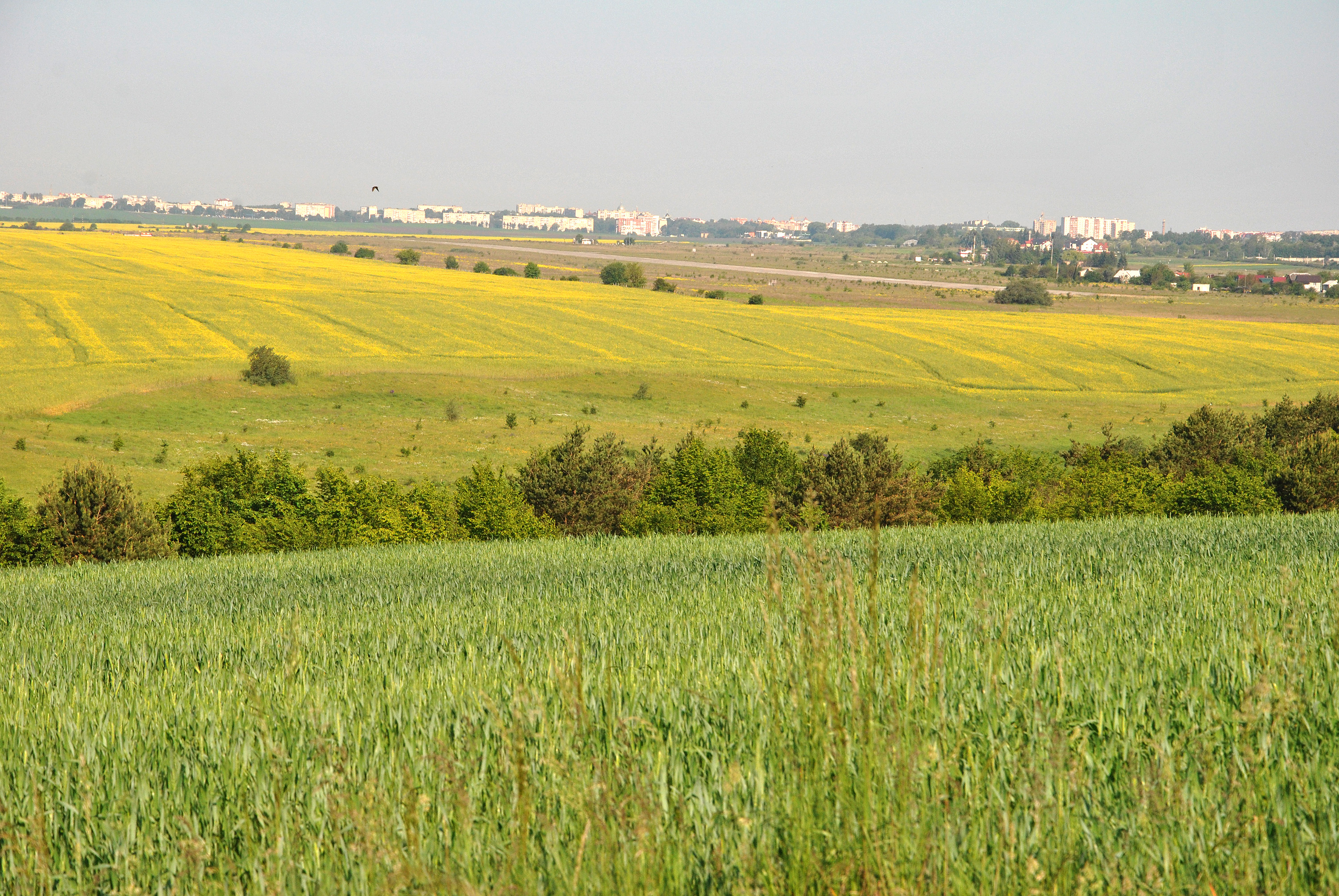
- View of Ternopil airport
- IATA: TNL; ICAO: UKLT

Summary
- Airport type: Public
- Operator: KP "Ternopilaviaavtotrans"
- Serves: Ternopil
- Location: Ternopil, Ternopil Oblast, Ukraine
- Elevation AMSL: 1,073 ft / 327 m
- Coordinates: 49°31′30″N 025°42′0″E
- Website: aeroport.te.ua

Maps
- Location of Ternopil Airport in Ukraine UKLT (Ukraine)
- Interactive map of Ternopil Airport

Runways
Direction	Length		Surface
Direction	ft	m	Surface
10/28	7,546	2,300	Concrete
12/30	2,461	750	Asphalt

Ternopil International Airport (Ukrainian: Міжнародний аеропорт «Тернопіль») (IATA: TNL, ICAO: UKLT) is an airport in Ukraine located 8 km southeast of Ternopil. It serves medium-sized airliners. The airport is relatively small and has a simple taxiway/tarmac layout owing to its size.

The airport does not currently [when?] have any scheduled flights, the last one being a Ternopil-Kyiv-Zhuliany route operated by Motor Sich Airlines from 31 May until 2 July 2010.

== History ==
The airport began operating in 1947. Since 1960, the airport has been located at its modern location and has a dirt runway. In 1969, the airport terminal was reconstructed, and in 1985, an artificial runway, taxiways and aprons were built.

After the new runway went into operation in May 1985, the operation of the modern air terminal began. Since then, Ternopil has been connected by air with many major cities of Ukraine. Airliners Yak-42, Yak-40, An-24 and An-2 flew to Kyiv, Moscow, Simferopol, Lviv, Donetsk, Zhytomir, Odesa, Chernivtsi, Uzhhorod, Rivne and Ivano-Frankivsk. There were also local connections with the cities of Borshchiv, Kremenets and the urban-type settlement Melnytsia-Podilska. Peak passenger traffic occurred in the early 1990s. During this period, in particular on Sundays, at the Ternopil airport one could simultaneously see the Yak-42 (Moscow), An-24 (Kyiv), An-24 (Simferopol), An-2 (Lviv), An-2 (Kremenets) aircraft. Since the early 1990s, there has been a gradual decrease in passenger traffic.

In 2001, the airport ceased to fully function. For some time, the facility did not play an important role - only a few flights per week were carried out.

In 2004, Ternopil airport received international airport status.

== See also ==
- List of airports in Ukraine
- List of the busiest airports in Ukraine
