= Konotop Air Base =

Konotop
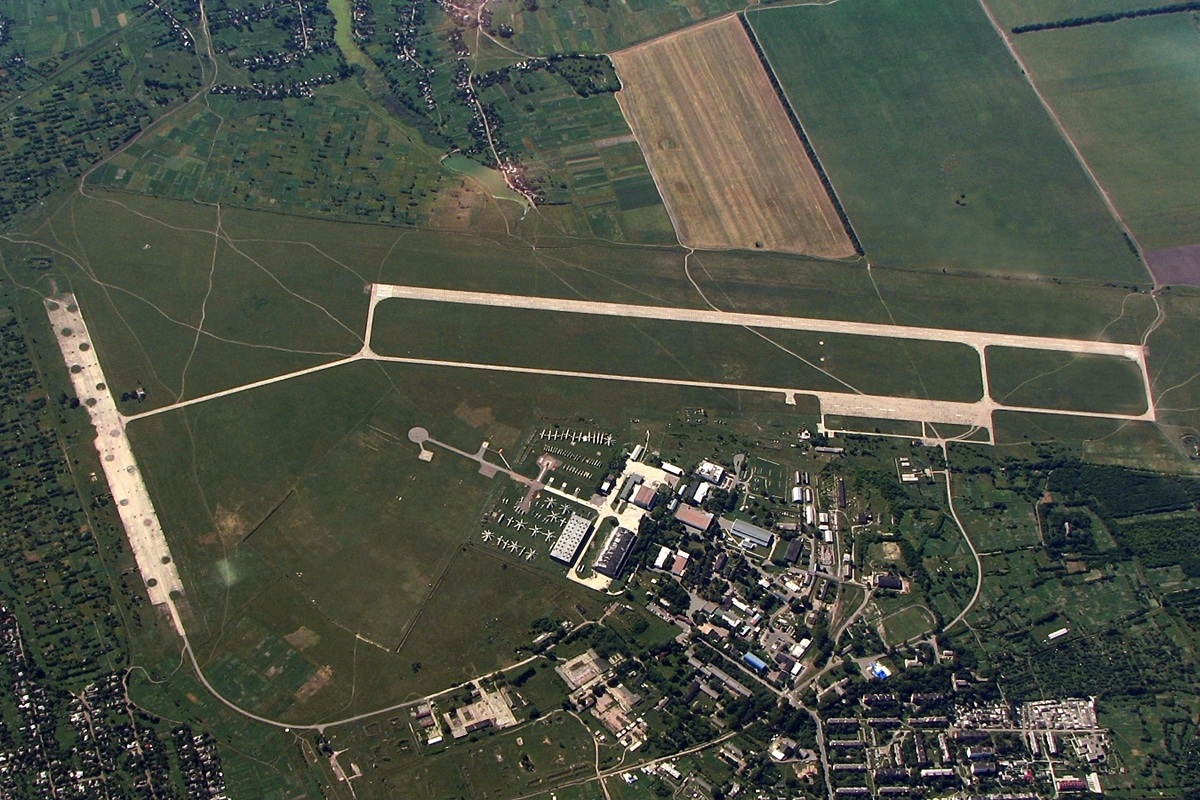
- IATA: none; ICAO: UKBF

Summary
- Airport type: Military
- Operator: Ukrainian Air Force
- Location: Konotop
- Elevation AMSL: 476 ft / 145 m
- Coordinates: 51°14′36″N 033°08′54″E
- Interactive map of Konotop

Runways
Direction	Length		Surface
Direction	ft	m	Surface
	6,562	2,000	Concrete

Konotop (ICAO: UKBF) is an air base in Ukraine located 4 km west of Konotop. It is a training base. During the end of the Cold War years, it was home to 105 UAP (105th Aviation Training Regiment) flying 101 Aero L-39 training jets.

Many helicopters and jet trainers are parked on a grassy area, and appear unused.

The base became a part of the territory taken in the 2022 Russian invasion of Ukraine. It is uncertain whether the base is in use, being approximately 25 km from the frontline.

== See also ==
- Brody Air Base
- Hostomel Airport
