= Bila Tserkva Air Base =

Military airport in Bila Tserkva, Ukraine

Bila Tserkva
- Bila Tserkva, Kyiv Oblast in Ukraine

Site information
- Type: Air Base
- Owner: Ministry of Defence
- Operator: Ukrainian Air Force

Location
- Shown within Kyiv Oblast Bila Tserkva (Ukraine)
- Coordinates: 49°47′46″N 30°01′28″E

Site history
- Built: 1951
- In use: 1951 - present

Airfield information
- Identifiers: ICAO: UKBC
- Elevation: 10 metres (33 ft) AMSL
Runways
Direction	Length and surface
18/36	2,500 metres (8,202 ft) Concrete

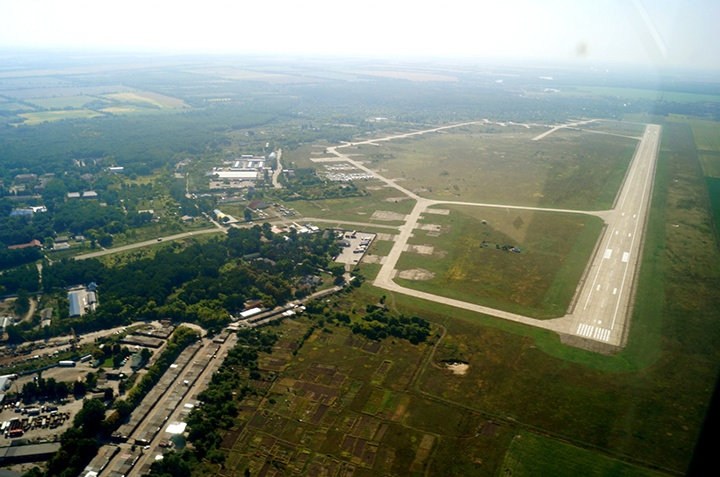
Bila Tserkva Air Base, aerial view of

Bila Tserkva is an airbase of the Ukrainian Air Force located near Bila Tserkva, Kyiv Oblast, Ukraine.

The base is home to the 1333rd Reserve and Scrap Aviation Base.

The base was home to the 251st Guards Heavy Bomber Aviation Regiment of the Soviet Air Forces between 1951 and 1992 with the Tupolev Tu-16N (ASCC: Badger-A).
