= Kanatove (air base) =

Air base in Kirovohrad Oblast, Ukraine

Kanatove
- Kropyvnytskyi, Kirovohrad Oblast in Ukraine

Site information
- Owner: Ministry of Defence
- Operator: Ukrainian Air Force

Location
- Shown within Kirovohrad Oblast Kanatove (Ukraine)
- Coordinates: 48°33′47″N 032°23′25″E

Site history
- In use: Unknown - present

Airfield information
- Elevation: 266 metres (873 ft) AMSL
Runways
| Direction | Length and surface |
|---|---|
| 09/27 | 2,465 metres (8,087 ft) Concrete |

Kanatove (Ukrainian: Канатове) is a reserve air base of the Ukrainian Air Force located near Kropyvnytskyi, Kirovohrad Oblast, Ukraine.

== History ==
The base was previously used by the Soviet Air Forces:

- 88th Fighter-Bomber Aviation Regiment between 1984 and 1987 as part of the 17th Air Army
- 190th Fighter Aviation Regiment between 1960 and 1990 as part of the 138th Fighter Aviation Division.
- 727th Guards Bomber Aviation Regiment between July 1987 and January 1992 as part of the 32nd Bomber Aviation Division

== 2022 invasion ==
On 6 May, during the 2022 Russian invasion of Ukraine, the Russian Defence Ministry said that its missiles destroyed aviation equipment at the Kanatove airfield. Three Ukrainian Su-27, bort numbers Blue 26, 46 and 48 were damaged.

On 23 July, three Su-27s and one Su-24 were destroyed during a Russian missile strike on the Air Base, one official died and 17 other servicemen were injured.
