= Kremenchuk Airport =

Kremenchuk (Velyka Kokhnivka) Airport Аеропорт «Кременчук» Аэропорт «Кременчуг»
- IATA: KHU; ICAO: UKHK

Summary
- Airport type: Public/military
- Serves: Kremenchuk, Poltava Oblast, Ukraine
- Coordinates: 49°07′51″N 033°28′31″E

Maps
- Location of the airport in Ukraine KHU (Ukraine)
- Interactive map of Kremenchuk (Velyka Kokhnivka) Airport
- Sources: GCM, ASN STV; Statistics: State Aviation Service of Ukraine; Source: Avianews.com

Kremenchuk (Velyka Kokhnivka) Airport (Ukrainian: Аеропорт «Кременчук», Russian: Аэропорт «Кременчуг») (IATA: KHU, ICAO: UKHK) is an airport in the Poltava Oblast, Ukraine. It is located at 5 km in the North-East of the Kremenchuk city.

In the 1990s, part of the airfield was transferred to a private company. Now it is used as a fuel and lubricants warehouse. Today, the airfield in Velyka Kokhnivka accepts helicopters and small airplanes An-24 and Yak-40."
