= Borodianka (air base) =

Borodianka Бородянка
- IATA: none; ICAO: UKKB

Summary
- Airport type: Sporting
- Operator: ASAIR
- Location: Borodianka
- Elevation AMSL: 463 ft / 141 m
- Coordinates: 50°40′0″N 029°54′0″E
- Website: http://asair.com.ua/en/borodyanka/

Maps
- Location in Kyiv Oblast UKKB (Ukraine)
- Interactive map of Borodianka

Runways
Direction	Length		Surface
Direction	ft	m	Surface
	9,842	3,000

Borodianka is a former military air base in Ukraine located 3 km northwest of Borodianka in Kyiv Oblast. Since the end of the Cold War, all except a small area has been converted to agricultural use. Since 2019 Borodianka has been used as a sporting aerodrome, hosting parachute jumping, sky-diving and model aeroplane flying.
