= Yevhenii Dykhne =

Ukrainian airline executive

- Євгеній Григорович Дихне
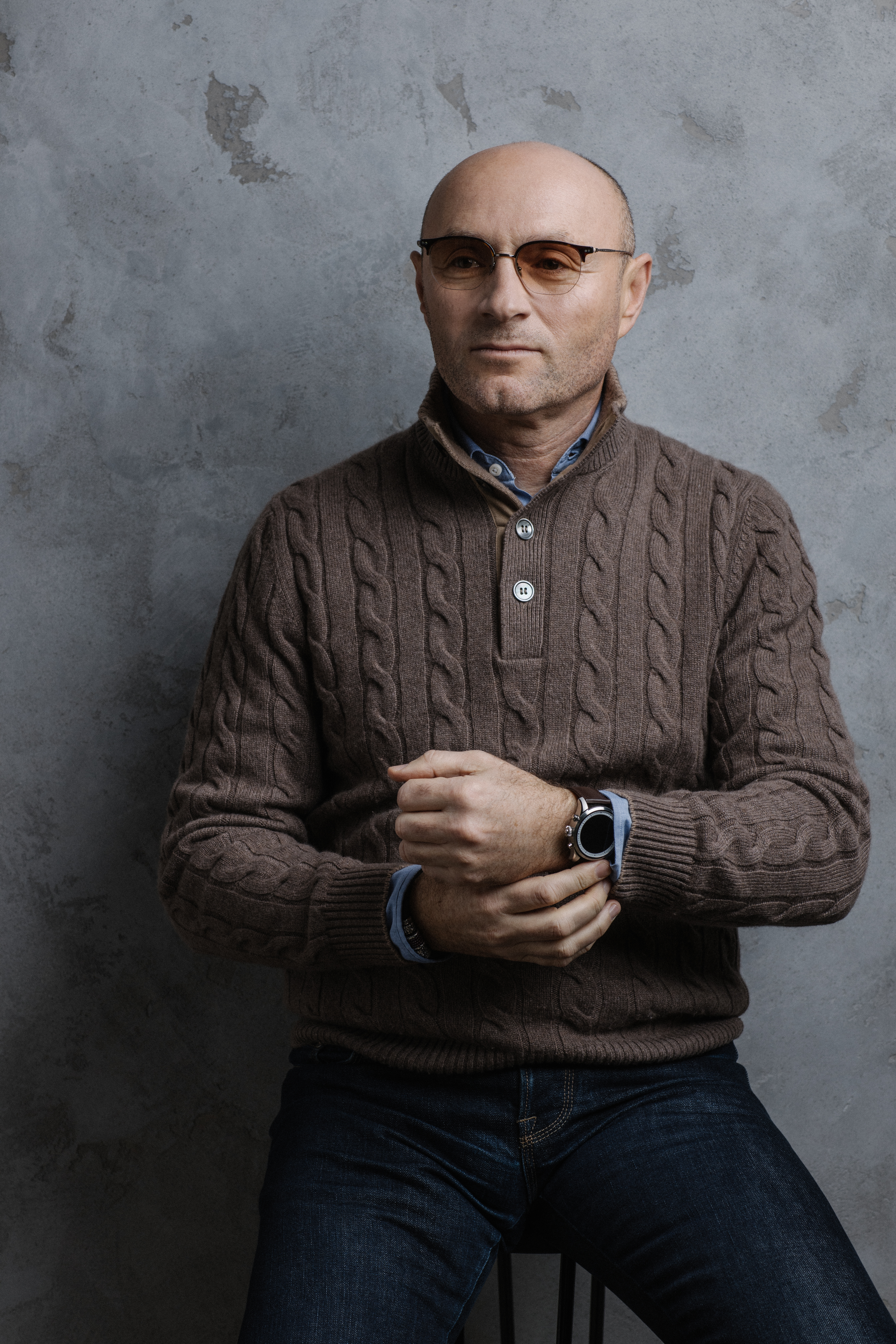
- Born: Yevhenii Hryhorovych Dykhne; October 12, 1963 (age 63); Chernivtsi, Ukrainian SSR
- Education: National Aviation University
- Occupation: airline executive
- Known for: Former President of Ukraine International Airlines

Yevhenii Dykhne (Ukrainian: Євгеній Григорович Дихне; 12 October 1963, Chernivtsi, Ukrainian SSR) is a Ukrainian airline executive. From 2019 to 2022 he was the president and chief executive officer (CEO) of Ukraine International Airlines. In 2023 he was sentenced to five years in prison for abuse of power.

== Education ==
Yevhenii Dykhne having completed the second education of the “Organization of transportation and management on the daily transport” at the National Aviation University (Kyiv) and secured a diploma on the topic “Optimization of throughput capacity”. The first education of the “Carriage and Carriage Gentlement” was taken from the Institute of Engineers for Railway Transport (Dnipropetrovsk) in 1988.

== Career ==
Dykhne is Member of the Aviation Committee at Ukrainian Chamber of Commerce and Industry, member of the supervisory board of the National Aviation University.

Prior to his appointment as CEO of UIA on September 18, 2019, Yevhenii Dykhne was the Senior Manager of Boryspil International Airport State Enterprise.

In 2014–2017, he is acting Director General of Boryspil International Airport State Enterprise. Operated under his direction Boryspil International Airport achieved record profit which raised the amount of payments to the budget in two times, performed all loan obligations timelyand has reached profound understanding with the basic airline. From 2017 worked as the First DeputyDirector General of the airport. Before joining Boryspil International Airport he held managerial positions in PJSC Ukrzaliznytsia.

In 2013–2014, Yevhenii Dykhne used to be the Director of Passengers Carriage Service at Ukrzaliznytsia, actively reforming the enterprise, contributing to strategy development and management of passenger services.

In 2008–2009 he worked as deputy director of the State Enterprise Settlement Center of the Ministry of Transportation and Communication of Ukraine.

In 2007–2008, Dykhne worked at Lviv Airlines as Deputy General Director, and later as General Director.

In 2023, Dykhne was sentenced to five years in prison for abuse of power for leasing out entrepreneurial property at below market value. He was also barred from holding business management or administrative positions for three years along with a fine of 8,500 Ukrainian hryvnia.

== Recognition ==
In December 2019, he was recognized as one of the 100 most influential Ukrainians in the rating by Focus magazine. At the end of 2019, together with the top management team, UIA initiated the optimization of the airline's route network in order to reduce excess costs and bring the company to break-even in 2020 with further stable development.

== Social activities ==
From October 2016 to October 2019, he was the chairman of the Aviation Committee at the Ukrainian Chamber of Commerce and Industry.

In March 2017, as the chairman of the Aviation Committee, he was elected a member of the Public Council at the State Aviation Administration of Ukraine to represent the interests of members of the committee and the aviation industry from the Chamber of Commerce and Industry of Ukraine.

In December 2017, he joined the activities of the Air Transport Committee under the Expert Council at the Ministry of Infrastructure of Ukraine.
