= Malév Flight 110 =

1971 aviation accident in Ukraine

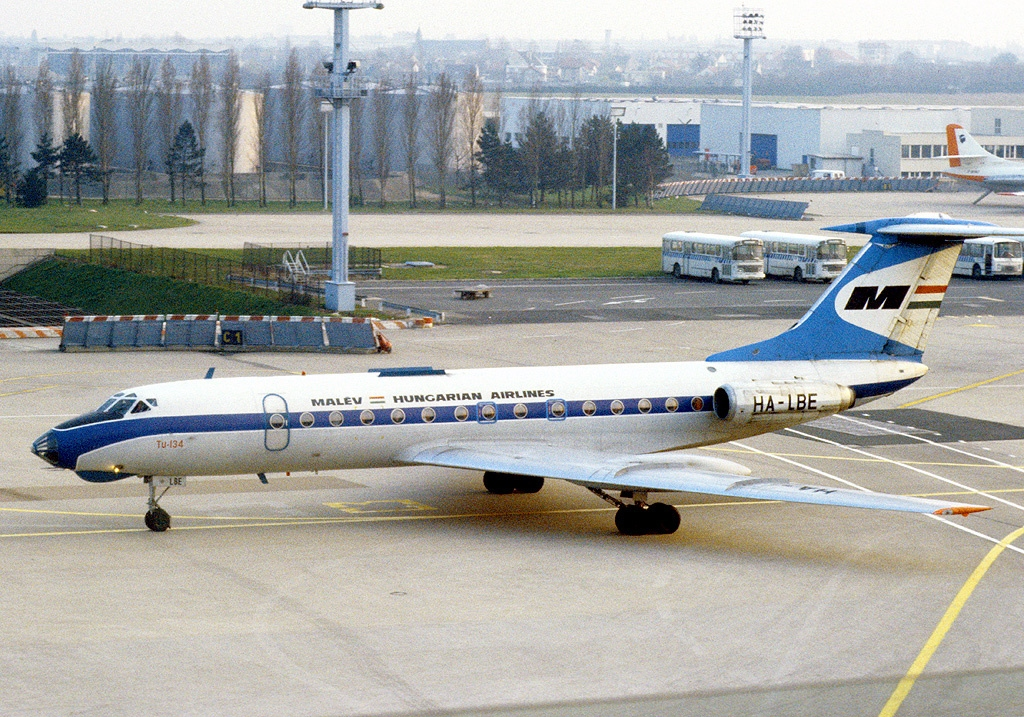
- An aircraft similar to the one involved in the accident

Accident
- Date: 16 September 1971
- Summary: Generator failure and foggy weather
- Site: Kyiv-Boryspil Airport, Ukraine SSR, Soviet Union

Aircraft
- Aircraft type: Tupolev Tu-134
- Operator: Malev Hungarian Airlines
- Registration: HA-LBD
- Flight origin: Budapest-Ferihegy Airport (now Budapest Ferenc Liszt International Airport), Hungary
- Destination: Kyiv-Boryspil Airport, Ukraine
- Passengers: 41
- Crew: 8
- Fatalities: 49
- Survivors: 0

Malév Flight 110 was a scheduled flight from Budapest-Ferihegy Airport to Boryspil Airport. On 16 September 1971, the Tupolev Tu-134 (HA-LBD) crashed near Kyiv-Boryspil Airport, Ukraine SSR, Soviet Union, due to poor visibility conditions, killing all 41 passengers and 8 crew on board (49 people in total). The crash of Flight 110 was Ukraine's third most deadliest airplane crash at the time, and as of 2022, the 10th deadliest in Ukraine.

== Accident ==
The flight from Budapest, Hungary had been delayed by more than an hour after the intended departure due to poor weather conditions. The flight eventually took off; however weather conditions created heavy fog leading to visibility of only roughly 1,800 metres (5,900 ft). These conditions made the crew unable to land on their first attempt. The plane could have returned to land at Budapest or another nearby airport, however the pilot chose to keep circling and try to land at Kyiv-Boryspil Airport. The airplane also signaled that the plane's generator had failed and had forced the crew to switch to the battery's auxiliary power, however, subsequent investigation found that this was a false signal which could have been (but was not) rectified. The crew informed ground control of this situation but did not report that it was an emergency according to protocol. In the event of such an emergency, it was recommended for crew to shut down excessive energy consumers like refrigerators, kitchen heaters or cabin lighting in order to allow the airplane to operate on battery power for longer, however this did not occur and battery life was halved as a consequence. Protocol was followed to safely lower the aircraft for a final attempt at descent but visibility had reduced even more, to 700 metres (2,300 ft), and the pilot was told incorrect yet crucial information about the conditions.

The plane deviated significantly from the advised flight-path and flew over the airport, losing integral radio and radar connection with ground-control. Battery power would have been significantly depleted, likely causing instrument malfunctions and leaving the crew unaware of critical information for a safe landing in the weather conditions. Investigation revealed that the plane sank too low to avoid collision and the right wing tip impacted the ground at a speed of about 550–580 kilometres per hour (300–310 kn; 340–360 mph), causing the aircraft to break into multiple pieces, killing the 8 crew members and 41 passengers aboard instantly. It was impossible to identify the victims from the wreckage. After an investigation, officials determined that the crash was caused by a series of events involving pilot error, mismanagement of the situation by ground crew, aircraft malfunctions, and poor conditions.
