= Ukraine International Airlines =

Ukraine's national airline

Ukraine International Airlines (UIA) Міжнародні Авіалінії України (МАУ)

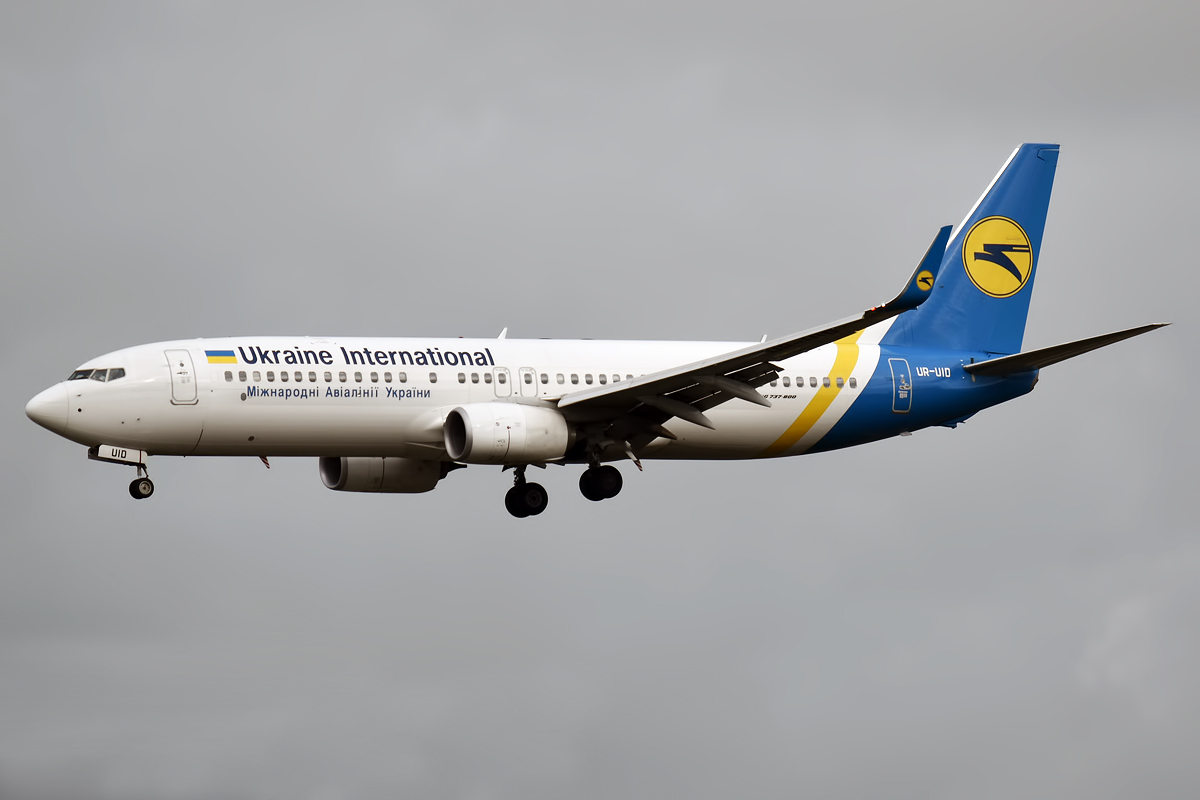
- Ukraine International Airlines Boeing 737-800
IATA	ICAO	Call sign
PS	AUI	UKRAINE INTERNATIONAL
- Founded: 29 October 1992
- Commenced operations: 1994
- Ceased operations: 22 November 2023 (bankrupt)
- Hubs: Kyiv–Boryspil
- Frequent-flyer program: Panorama Club
- Fleet size: 25 as of 2021
- Destinations: 80+ as of 2021
- Headquarters: Kyiv, Ukraine

Ukraine International Airlines PJSC, (Note: Ukrainian: Авіакомпанія Міжнародні Авіалінії України, romanized: Aviakompaniya Mizhnarodni Avialiniyi Ukrayiny, IPA: [ˌɑwijɐkomˈpɑn⁽ʲ⁾ijɐ miʒnɐˈrɔd⁽ʲ⁾n⁽ʲ⁾i ˌɑwijɐˈl⁽ʲ⁾in⁽ʲ⁾iji ʊkrɐˈjinɪ].) often shortened to UIA, (Note: Ukrainian: МАУ.) was the flag carrier and the largest airline of Ukraine, with its head office in Kyiv and its main hub at Kyiv's Boryspil International Airport. It operated domestic and international passenger flights and cargo services to Europe, the Middle East, the United States, Canada, and Asia.

The airline was significantly affected by the Russo-Ukrainian war, due to the closure of Ukrainian airspace to civil air traffic. A number of limited flights continued to operate until conflicts arose between stakeholder factions backed by Aron Mayberg and Ihor Kolomoiskyi, resulting in the company suspending operations in late 2022. By this time UIA had amassed significant debts, resulting in the company being placed in bankruptcy administration on 22 November 2023.

== History ==
=== Early history ===
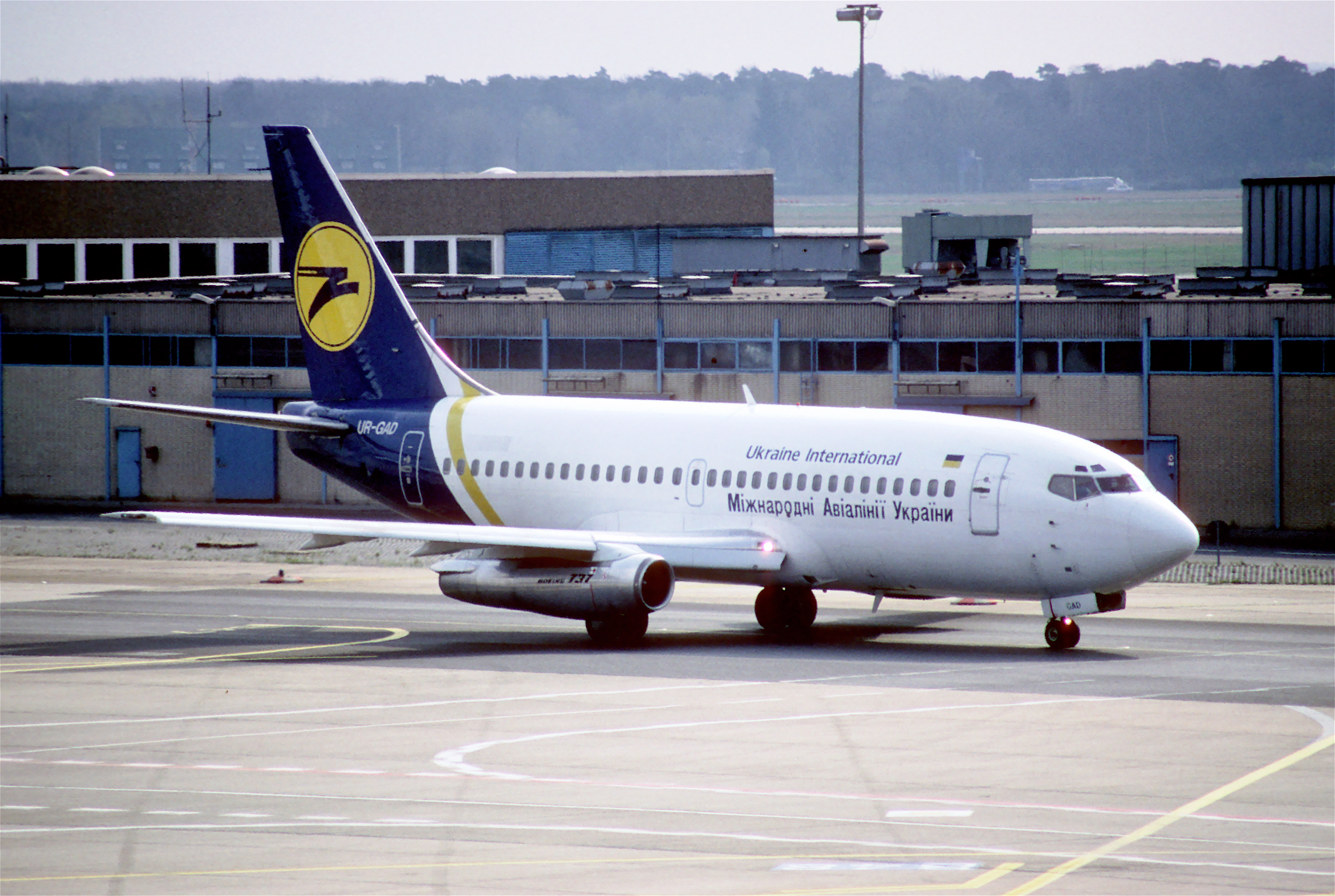
Ukraine International Airlines Boeing 737-200 in 1998

Ukraine International Airlines was established as an alternative to Ukraine Airlines, a remnant of the Soviet Era in which each country had an operating airline under financial and commercial control of Aeroflot's main office in Moscow until the Soviet Union broke up and the airliners on the ground at each airport became the property of the state in which they were grounded. In early 1992, the then Minister for Aviation in Ukraine reached an agreement on the lease of 2 Boeing 737-400s from Guinness Peat Aviation (GPA), an Irish aircraft-leasing company, and the establishment of a new airline to operate at "internationally acceptable standards of Safety, Reliability, and Service between Ukraine and Europe."

In September 1992, GPA and the new airline appointed Dublin-based International Aviation consultancy Avia International to lead the establishment and launch of the airline. Working closely with selected ex-staff of Ukraine Airlines, the joint team succeeded in launching flights to multiple destinations on schedule, beginning with a Kyiv-London flight on 25 November 1992. Other routes inaugurated in this period connected Kyiv with Berlin, Paris, Frankfurt, Vienna, and Amsterdam.

It became one of the first "joint ventures with foreign capital" in Ukraine and the first airline in the former Soviet Union to use then-new Boeing 737-400. The founding shareholders were the Ukrainian Association of Civil Aviation and GPA.

The airline began cargo operations with a Boeing 737-200 on 13 November 1994 to London and Amsterdam.

In 1996, Austrian Airlines and Swissair became shareholders, investing US$9 million in new equity.

In 2000, the European Bank for Reconstruction and Development became a shareholder by investing US$5.4 million. In 2006, UIA adopted a new classification system for freight operations which allowed the airline to carry a wider range of goods, ranging from live animals to fresh food and valuable objects. Additionally, an express service was introduced to meet the needs of customers wishing to use expedited cargo-delivery services.

=== Developments since 2013 ===
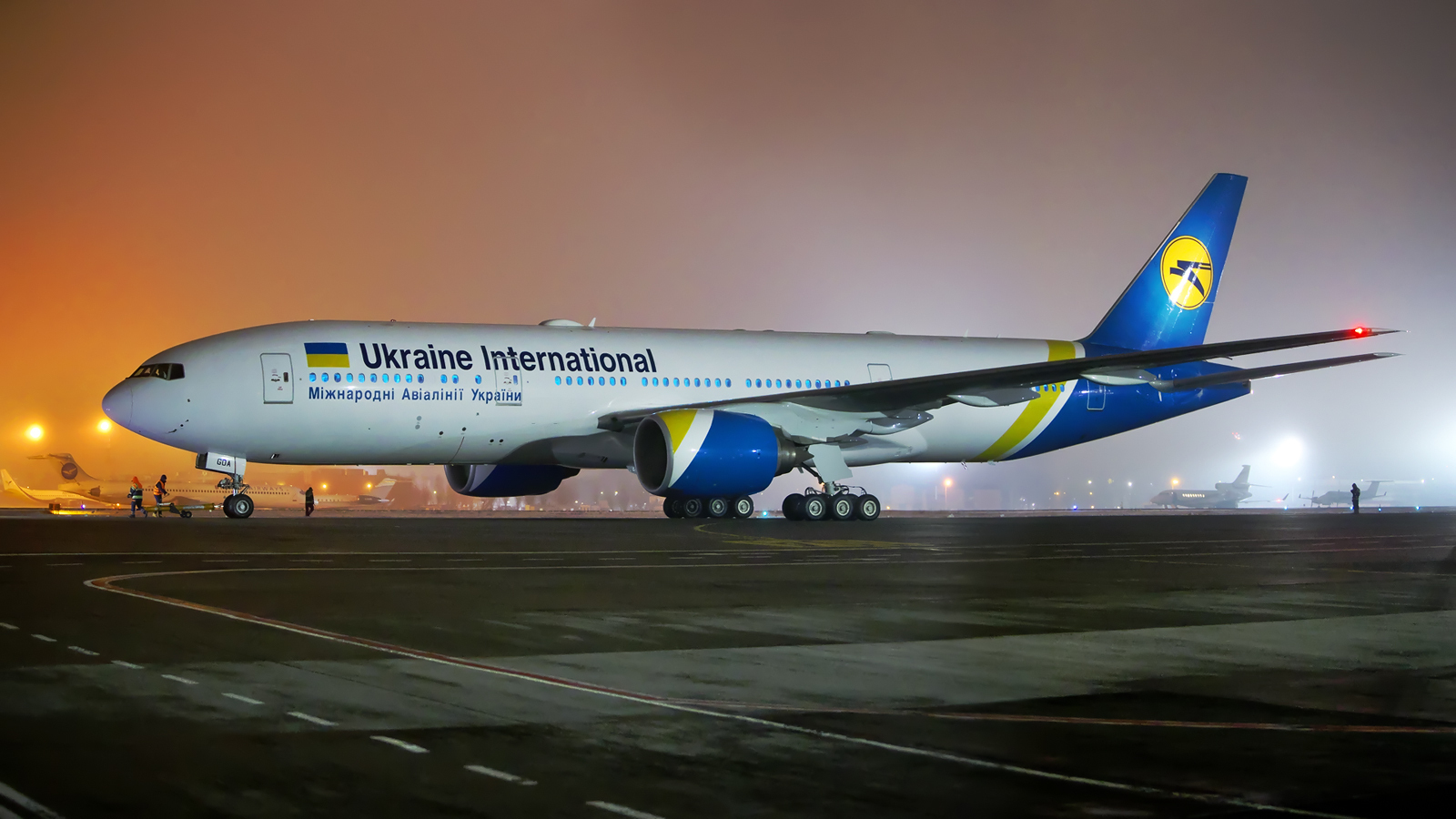
Ukraine International Airlines' first Boeing 777-200ER delivered in February 2018

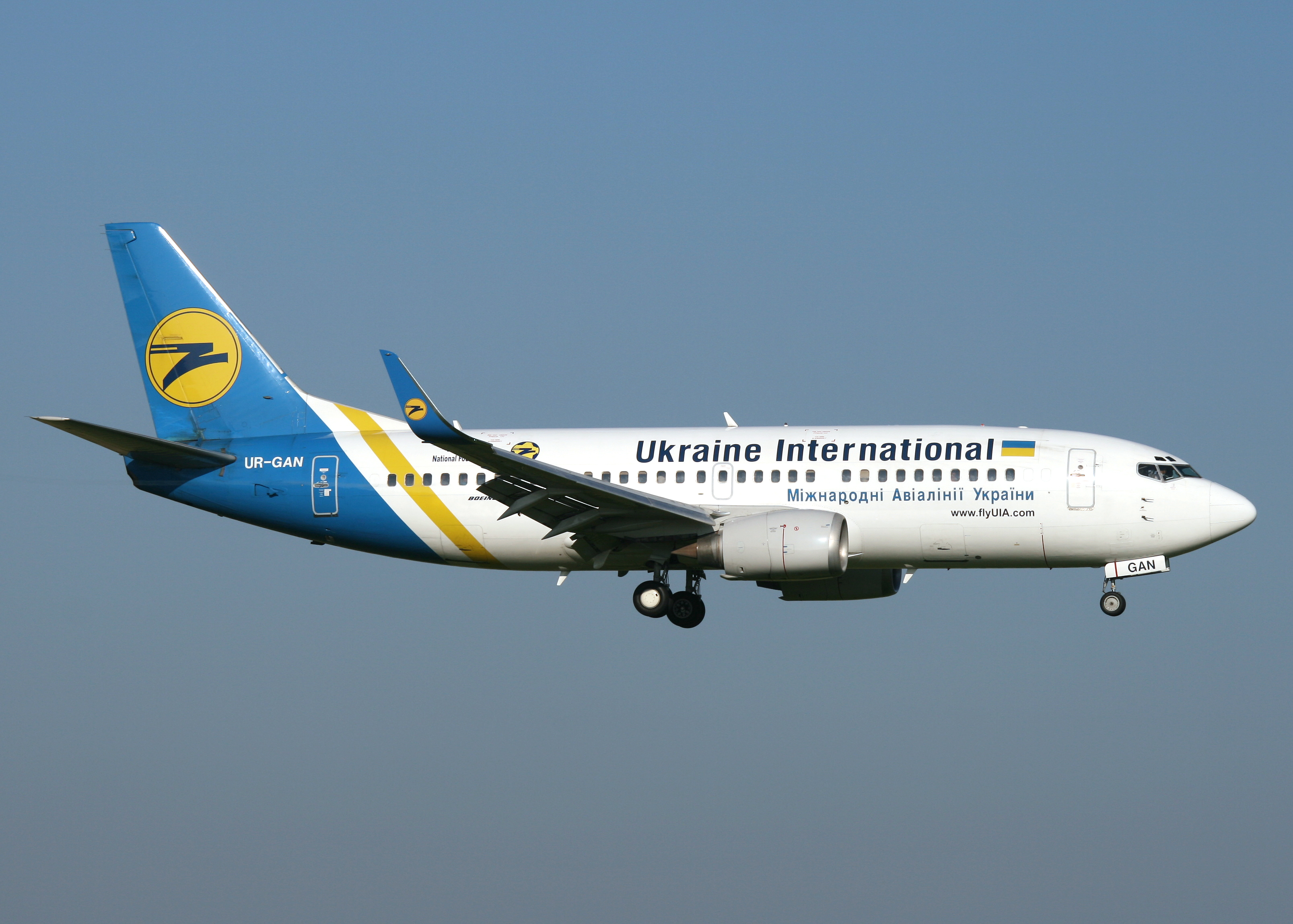
A former Ukraine International Airlines Boeing 737-300 which was retired in 2019

In the first half of 2013, the airline's patronage rose by 60% to 2,200,000 passengers. According to the company's president, Yuri Miroshnikov, UIA planned to achieve the same 2013 yearly results (i.e. to reach annual patronage of 4,400,000). Also in 2013, due to the demise of competitor Aerosvit, UIA launched new flights from Ukraine to Baku, Azerbaijan; Yerevan, Armenia; Larnaca, Cyprus; Munich, Germany; Warsaw, Poland; Vilnius, Lithuania; Prague, Czech Republic; Athens, Greece; Batumi, Georgia; Moscow (Sheremetyevo Airport), Yekaterinburg, Saint Petersburg, Kaliningrad, Nizhnevartovsk, Novosibirsk, Rostov-on-Don, and Sochi in Russia; and Bishkek, Kyrgyzstan. On 25 April 2014, UIA began non-stop flights from Kyiv to John F. Kennedy International Airport in New York City, United States.

In October 2015, the Russian government banned UIA from flying to Russian destinations as a response to a ban by the Ukrainian government on Russian airlines flying into Ukraine. Russia had annexed Crimea in 2014.

Since June 2016, most of UIA's international flights are sold with the basic "hand luggage-only tariff." If passengers booking this tariff want to check-in luggage, the airline charges fees up to US$60 per flight. Also, since the northern-hemisphere summer of 2016, UIA wet-leased an Embraer ERJ-145 from Dniproavia (also part of the Privat Group) for daily services to Chernivtsi (because the condition of the airport there doesn't allow E190 and 737 operations).

On 14 June 2016, the National Anti-Corruption Bureau of Ukraine had the offices of UIA searched because of an investigation by the Bureau into passenger fees not paid to the State Aviation Fund.

In March 2018, Ukraine International announced a fleet modernization plan. While the first of three pre-owned Boeing 777-200ER aircraft had already been delivered, the airline expected several new Boeing 737 and Embraer E195 aircraft during the year to replace its last Boeing 737 Classics.

Ukraine International ceased its membership of the Flying Blue rewards program on 1 January 2019. UIA expected losses of approximately US$50 million for 2019 and implemented cost-saving measures, according to the new CEO.

In September 2021, UIA announced plans to add two Boeing 777-300s to their fleet, primarily for charter operations.

=== Suspension of operations ===
The operations of the airline were severely limited following the escalation of the Russo-Ukrainian war in February 2022. As a result of the conflict, Ukrainian airspace was closed to civil aircraft. The airline suspended flights from 24 February of that year, hoping to restart them by 23 March, before extending the suspension until the end of May 2022. Castellón–Costa Azahar Airport in Spain became a storage facility for their fleet of six Boeing 737 aircraft.

Further suspension extensions were periodically announced, with the current extension announced on 10 April 2023. As of July 20, 2023, the suspension notice states that flights to and from Ukraine will be suspended "until martial law in Ukraine is lifted, and Ukrainian airspace is reopened".

The operation of several aircraft that had been located outside Ukrainian airspace continued, with flights taking place to destinations within Europe. However, operations would be halted completely in October 2022 as a result of conflict between the shareholders of the airline, namely Aron Mayberg and Ihor Kolomoiskyi.

=== Bankruptcy ===
In December 2022, Hanna Borysonnik, a close associate of Ihor Kolomoyskyi, was elected as the president of UIA. Under a shareholder agreement, Aron Mayberg historically chose the airline's president while Kolomoisky's group chose the CFO, meaning Borysonnik's rise marked a transfer of top executive control. In early 2023, Mayberg, as well as Oleksandra Nikitina were removed from the companies board. Following this, several of the airlines former aircraft were transferred to Windrose Airlines.

In 2023, the assets of the company were sold in an auction where Okealos Company LLC acquired the trademarks of the airline. On 31 October 2023, Ukreximbank filed a lawsuit to the Commercial Court of the City of Kyiv, with the companies financial obligations amounting to more than 20 billion hryvnia. On 22 November 2023, the Commercial Court of Kyiv City placed the company into bankruptcy administration due to debt owed to Ukreximbank.

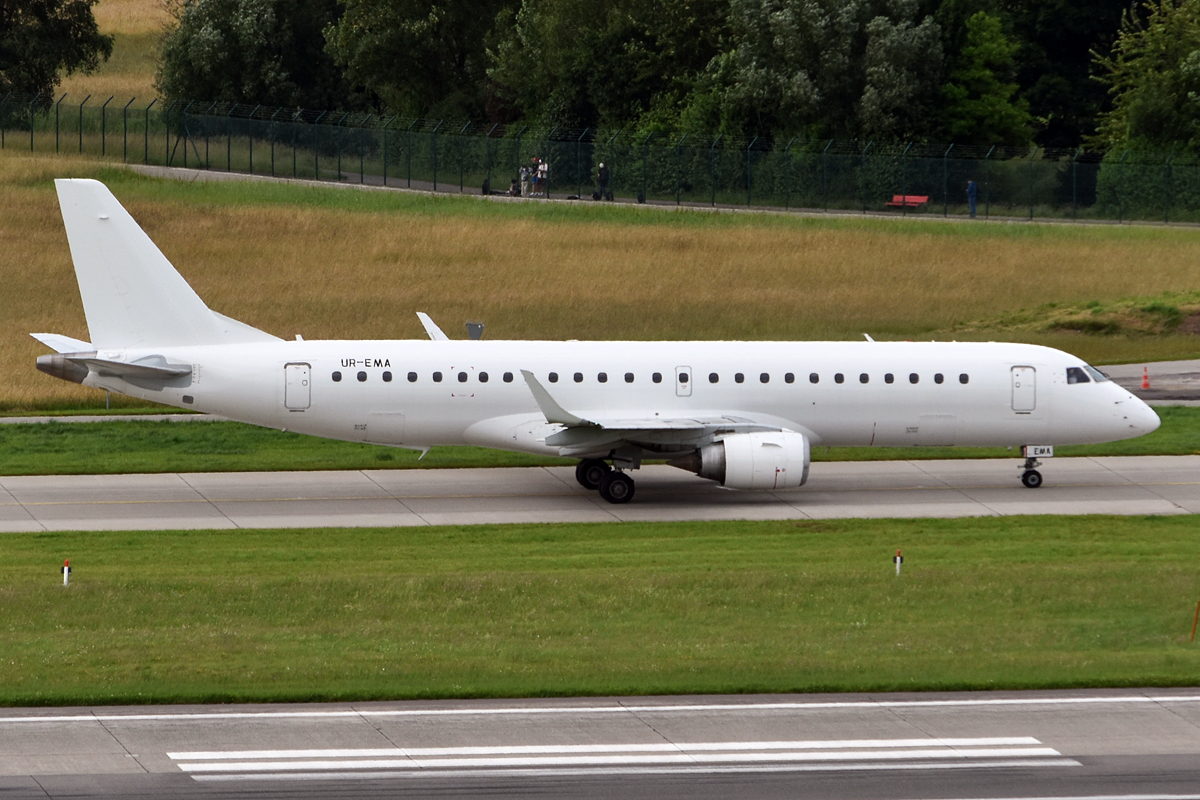
A former Ukraine International Airlines ERJ 190, transferred to Windrose Airlines in 2023.

In late 2024, the Security Service of Ukraine seized a number of aircraft formerly operated by UIA on the grounds of links to tax evasion. The decision was connected with the earlier arrest of Ihor Kolomoyskyi in 2023 and the transfer of several of the airlines aircraft to Windrose Airlines via the oligarchs Cyprus-based leasing entity

In February 2025, Ukrainian President Volodymyr Zelenskyy imposed sanctions on a number of prominent oligarchs, including Ihor Kolomoyskyi, formerly a close associate of the president. In July 2025, several former executives of the airline, including Yevhenii Dykhne were suspected of tax evasion exceeding 344 million UAH. Dykhne had been separately sentenced in 2023 to 5 years in prison in an abuse-of-office case involving Boryspil International Airport. An Ontario Court of Appeal upheld a ruling that the airline was legally responsible to pay full compensation to the families of the passengers of Ukraine International Airlines Flight 752, after it was mistakenly shot down by the Iranian Revolutionary Guard Corps in 2020.

In 2026 a number of claims from Boryspil International Airport were upheld by the Commercial Court of Kyiv against UIA as a result of a sizable number of unpaid fees. Additionally, it was discovered that several aircraft that had been stored at the airport as mortgaged collateral were missing key components, including the disappearance of several CFM International CFM56 engines. Similar incidents had occurred with two Boeing 737 aircraft of Trans Air Congo that had been parked at Hostomel Airport, with the engines being sold under falsified documents to the airline Libyan Express, and installed on former UIA aircraft operated by the North African carrier.

The reconstitution of Ukraine International Airlines through state intervention remains unlikely. In 2021, Ukrainian President Volodymr Zelensky had proposed the creation of a new national carrier named Ukraine National Airlines. While initially envisaged to begin operations in 2022, the project remains indefinitely on hold due to the closure of Ukrainian airspace. Subsequently, the private low-cost SkyUp Airlines remains the de-facto flag carrier of Ukraine.

== Corporate affairs ==
=== Ownership ===
In February 2011, the Ukrainian government sold its 61.6% stake in UIA to three existing minority shareholders for ₴287 million (US$36.2 million). As of 26 July 2013, the airline was owned by Ukraine-based Capital Investment Project LLC (74%) and Cyprus-based Ontobet Promotions Limited (26%). Capital Investment Process, in turn, is owned by Ontobet. The owners are represented by Aron Mayberg, a business partner of Igor Kolomoyskyi and the former CEO of the bankrupt AeroSvit Airlines, from which partially licences and planes were transferred to Ukraine International Airlines.

Yuri Miroshnikov stepped down as president of Ukraine International Airlines (UIA) on 12 September 2019 after 15 years of managing Ukraine's national carrier and working for UIA since 1993. Yevhenii Dykhne took on the leadership role at UIA on 18 September 2019.

=== Business figures ===
As of 22 June 2016, the ownership structure is registered as the following: 74.1627% Capital Investment Project, Ukraine and 15.9108% Ontobet Promotions Ltd, Cyprus. 2016 was the second year in a row that the company made a loss, despite seeing growth in passengers. According to a February statement by company head Yuri Miroshnikov, UIA was struggling to stay profitable in the face of growing competition from budget airlines. In 2017, the company recorded a ₴304 million loss. Ukraine International Airlines posted a net loss of almost ₴2.7 billion (about $100 million) in 2018, or about nine times more than it lost in 2017, Ukrainian media reported on 25 March, citing a UIA investor report. As of 2019, Ukraine International Airlines (UIA) was to slow down its expansion plans to stabilise its financial performance and climb out of the red. The head of the state air traffic regulator of Ukraine stated at 8 November 2019 that UIA owes them ₴1 billion of unpaid fees and penalties.

== Destinations ==
Before suspending operations, UIA connected Ukraine to over 80 destinations in Europe, Asia, Middle East and North America from its base at Boryspil Airport in Kyiv, and also operated domestic flights. UIA served over 1000 flights per week.

UIA was forced to make some involuntary changes to its summer 2019 flight schedules, with reduced frequencies and capacity on some selected routes. Although not officially a budget airline, many of UIA's worldwide flights are popular with travellers because of its low fares, who use Boryspil International Airport as a transport hub.

Due to ongoing losses, the airline suspended flights to Amman, Riga, Beijing and Minsk in November 2019. From 2020, flights to Bangkok and Krakow were also suspended. Following the 2022 Russian invasion of Ukraine, the airline ceased operations temporarily and suspended all flights to all destinations.

=== Codeshare agreements ===
Prior to the Russian invasion of Ukraine, Ukraine International Airlines had codeshare agreements with the following airlines:

- Air Astana
- Air France
- Air Moldova
- airBaltic
- Austrian Airlines
- Azerbaijan Airlines
- EgyptAir
- Iberia
- KLM
- TAP Air Portugal
- Turkish Airlines

== Fleet ==
=== Fleet in 2021 ===
In its final full year of operations, Ukraine International Airlines consisted of the following aircraft:

Aircraft	In service	Orders	Passengers				Notes
Aircraft	In service	Orders	B	E+	E	Total	Notes
Boeing 737-800	12	0	—	—	186	186	
Boeing 737-900ER	4	0	—	—	189	189	
Boeing 737-900ER	4	0	—	—	215	215	
Boeing 767-300ER	2	0	12	38	211	261	
Boeing 777-300	2	2	12	14	400	426	
Embraer ERJ-190	5	0	8	—	96	104	
Embraer ERJ-195	2	1	—	—	118	118	
Total	25	3					

=== Fleet history ===
All the aircraft ever operated by Ukraine International Airlines:

Aircraft	Total	Introduced	Retired	Notes
Airbus A330-200	1	2016	2017	Leased from Windrose Airlines.
Antonov An-148-100B	3	2011	2013	
Boeing 737-200	3	1994	2005	First aircraft type in the fleet back in 1992.
Boeing 737-300	9	1995	2018	
Boeing 737-300BDSF	1	2008	2017	
Boeing 737-400	7	1993	2015	
Boeing 737-500	13	2001	2018	
Boeing 737-800	26	2009	2022	
Boeing 737-900ER	4	2013	2022	
Boeing 737 MAX 8	-	2019	2026	Never entered service due to the Boeing 737 MAX groundings. Leased from the Industrial and Commercial Bank of China.
Boeing 767-300	4	2013	2021	
Boeing 777-200ER	4	2018	2020	Leased from AerCap.
Embraer ERJ-190	5	2013	2022	
Embraer ERJ-195	2	2019	2022	Leased from AerCap.

=== Gallery ===
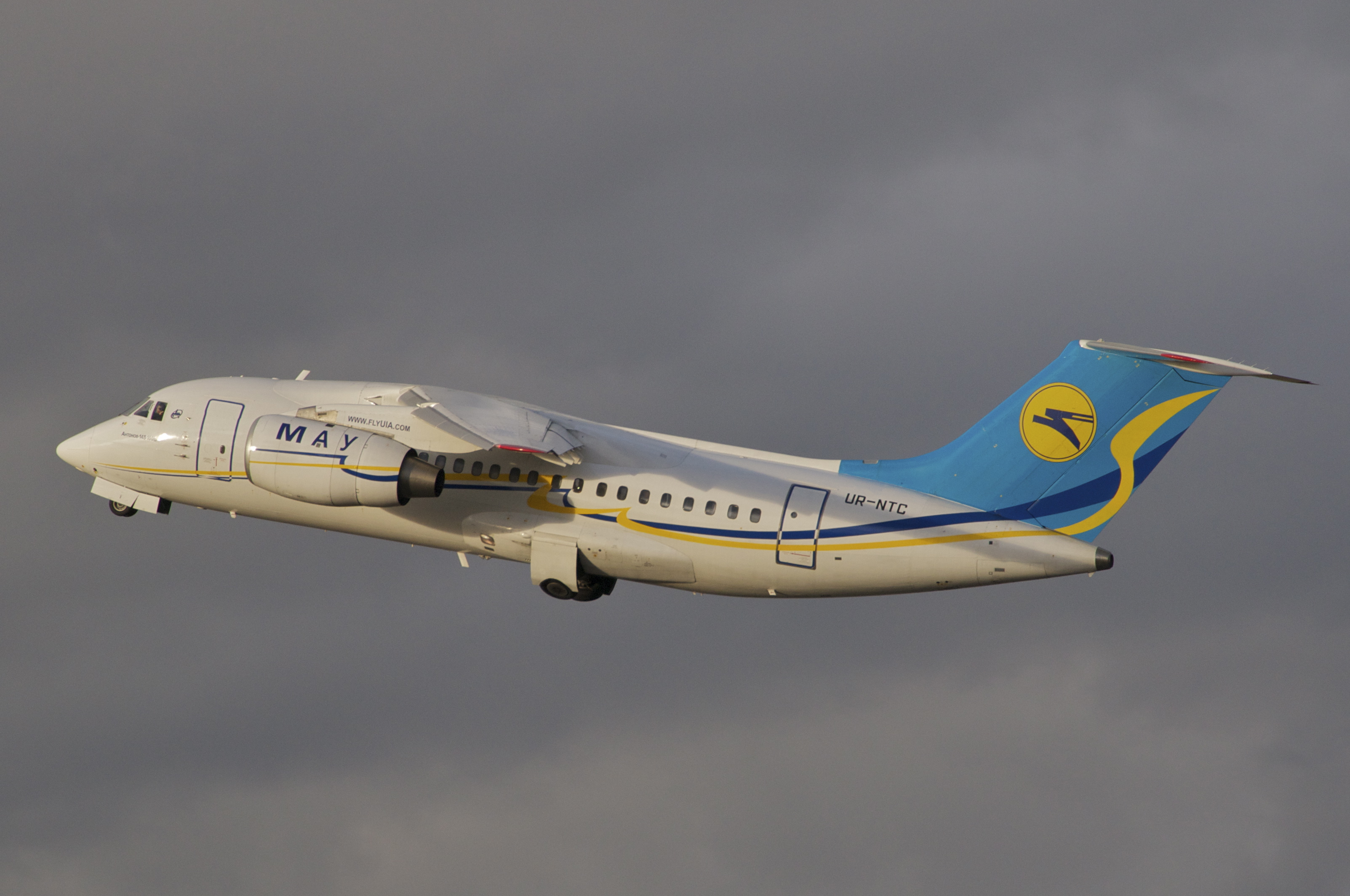
Antonov An-148

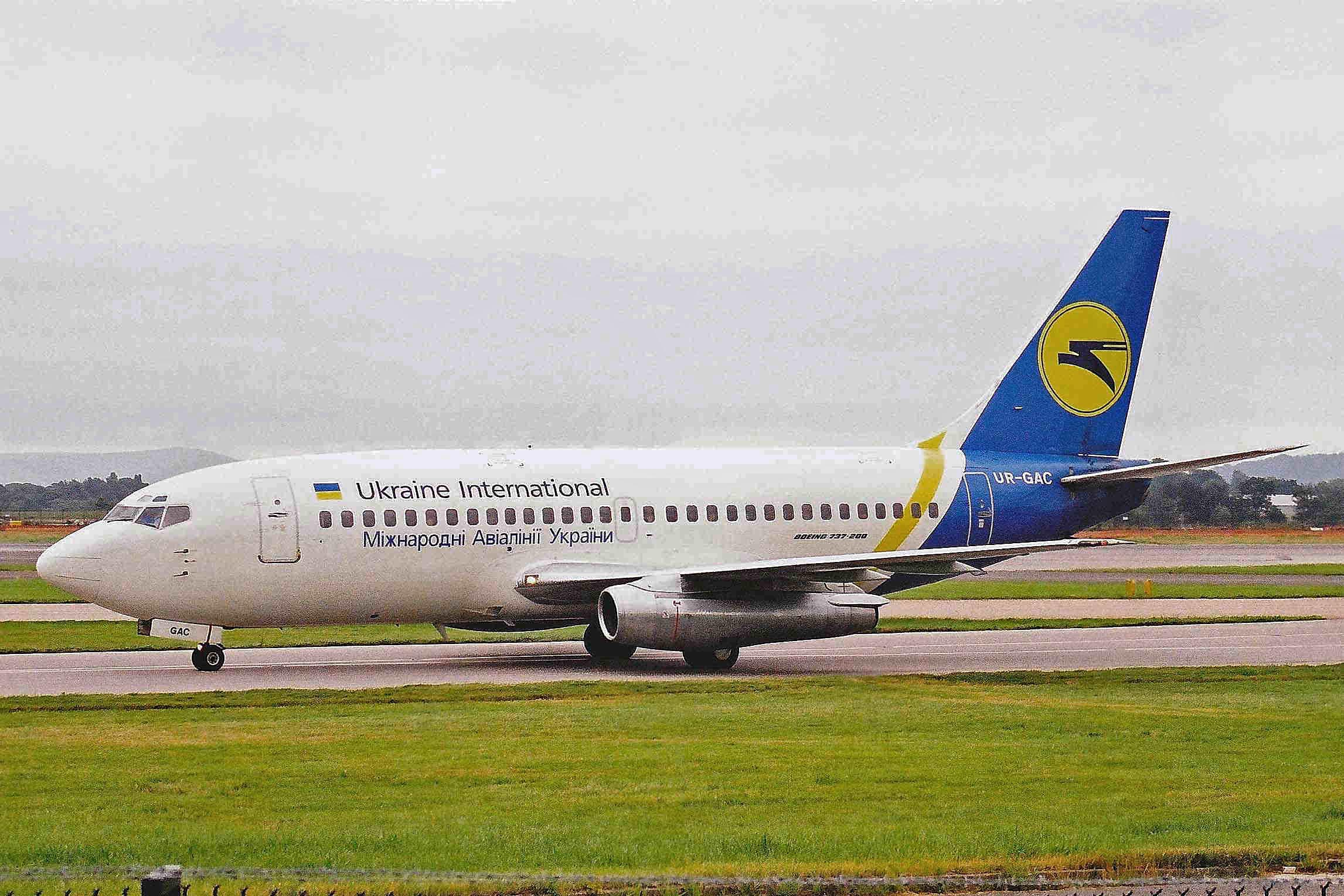
Boeing 737-200

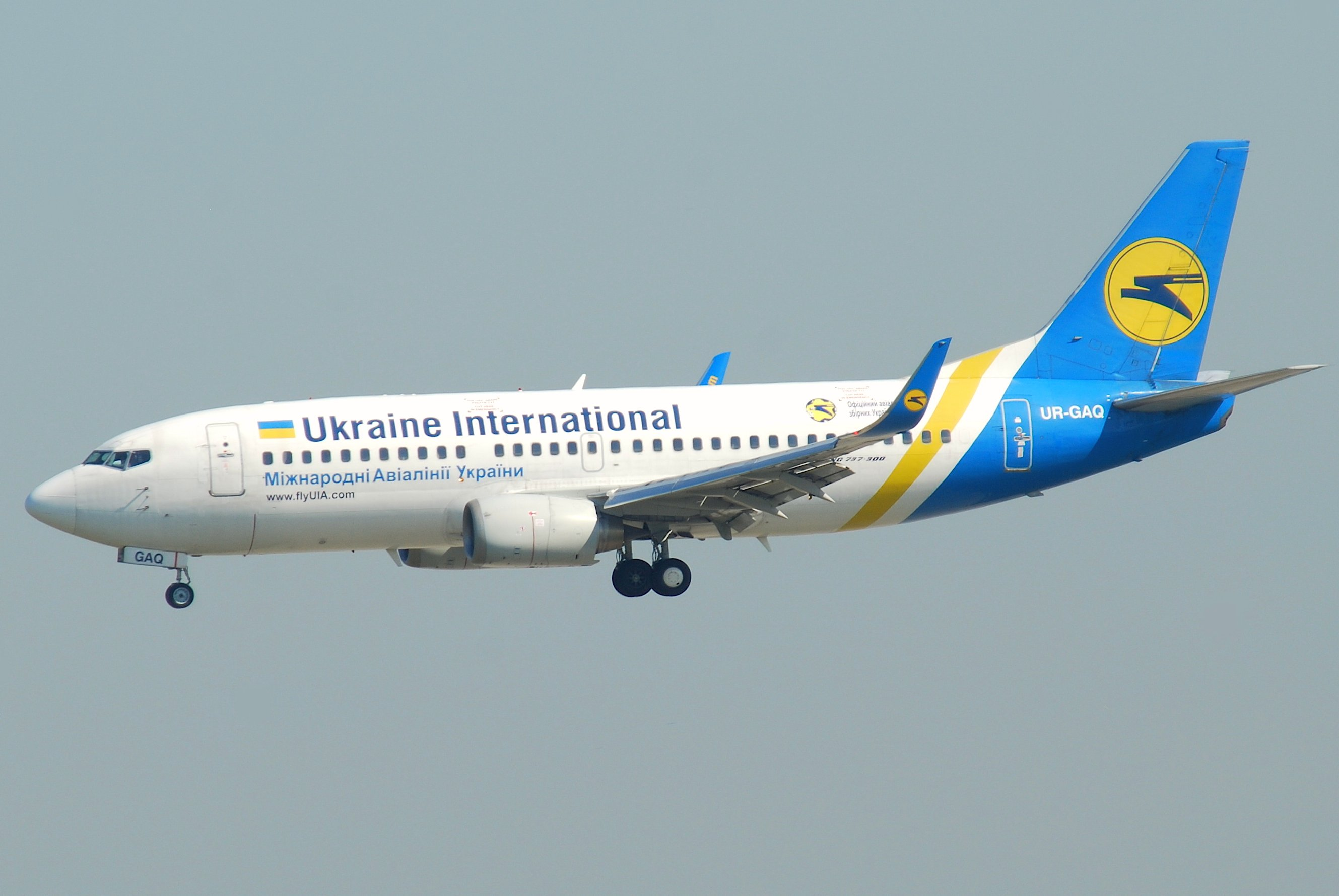
Boeing 737-300

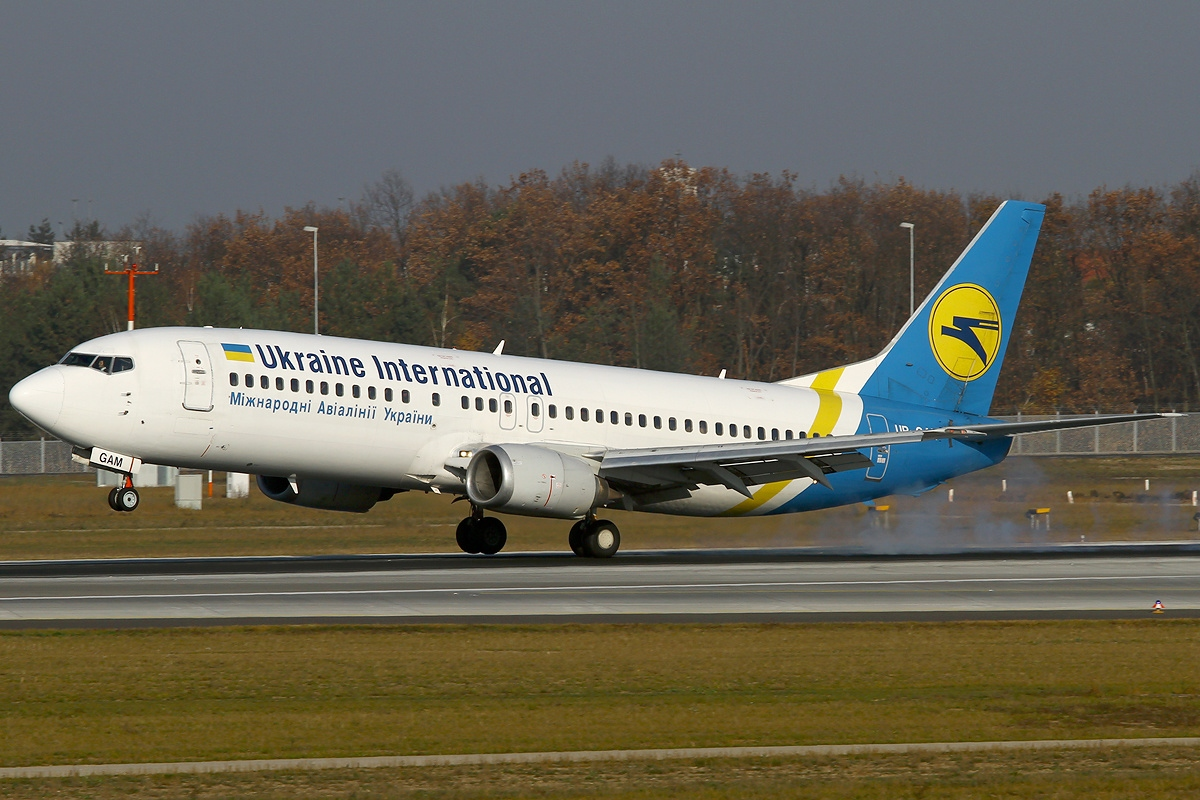
Boeing 737-400

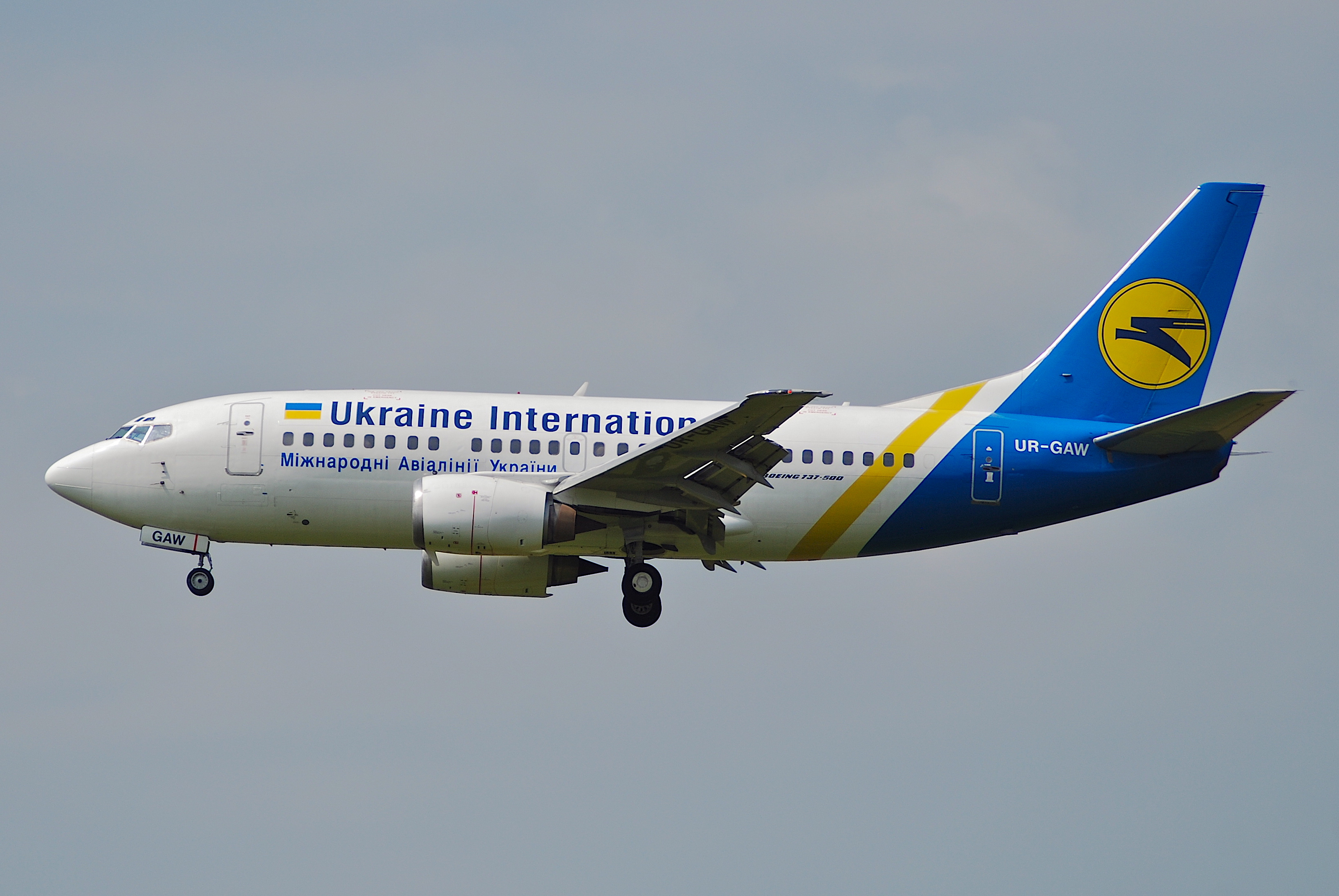
Boeing 737-500

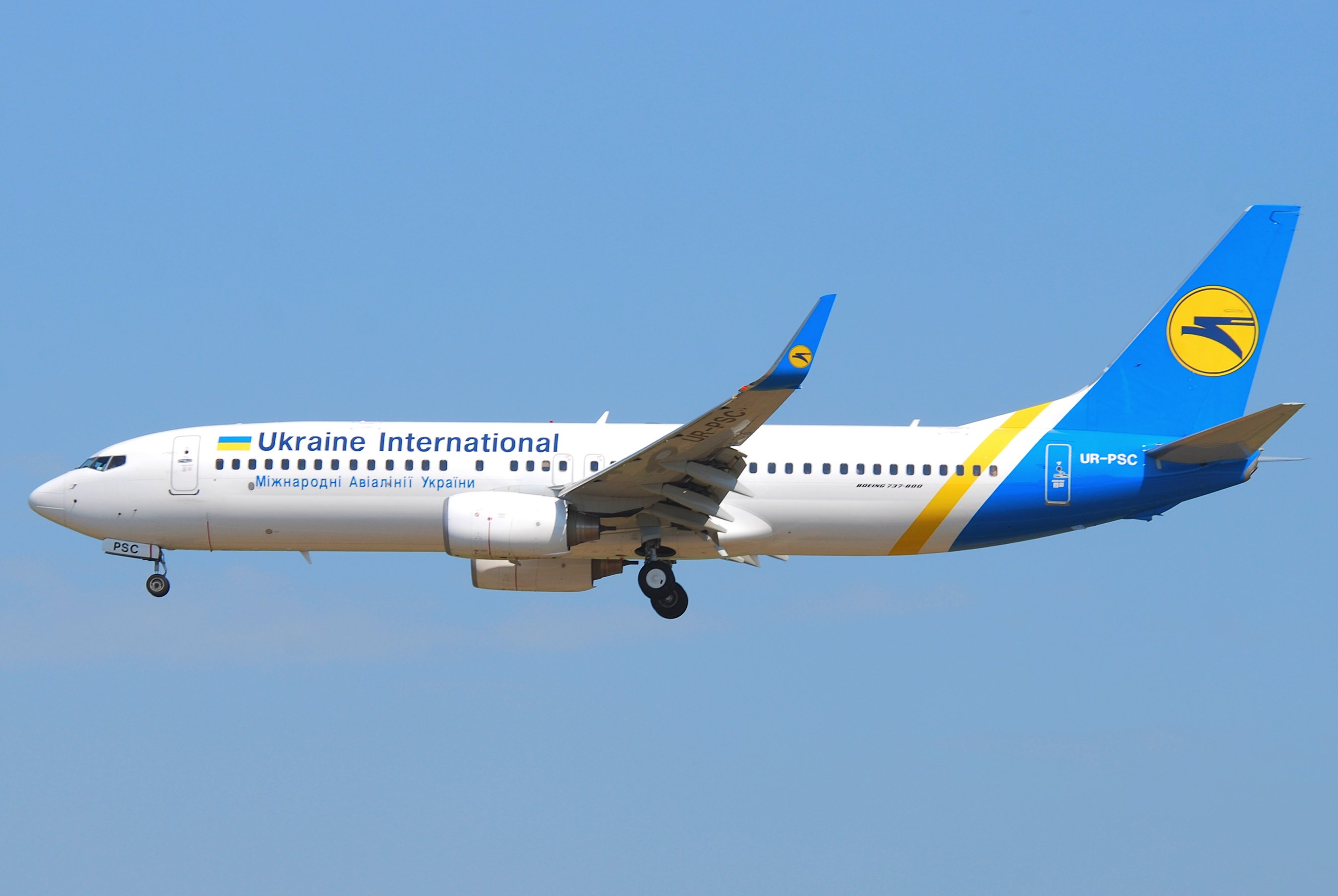
Boeing 737-800

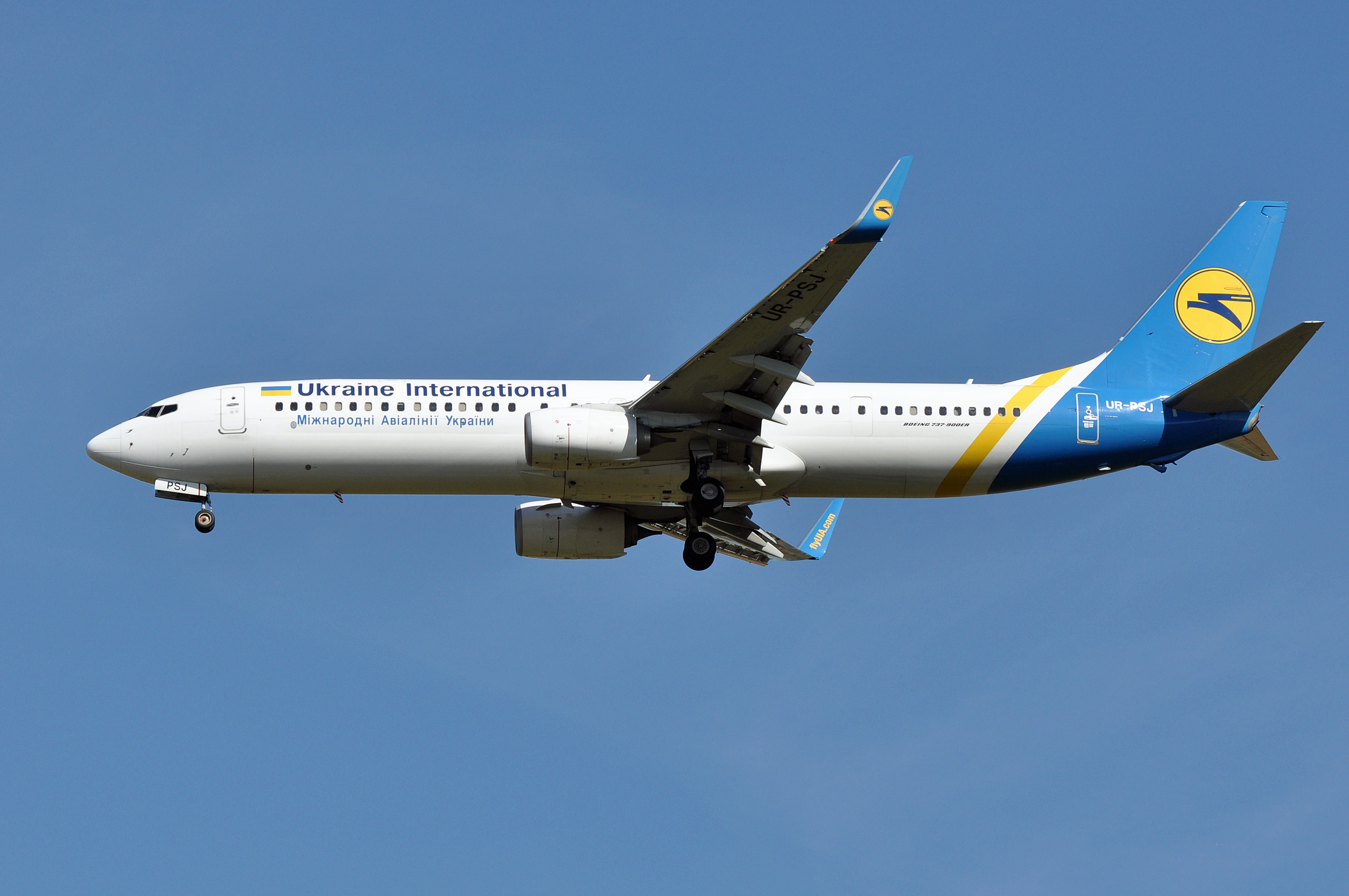
Boeing 737-900ER

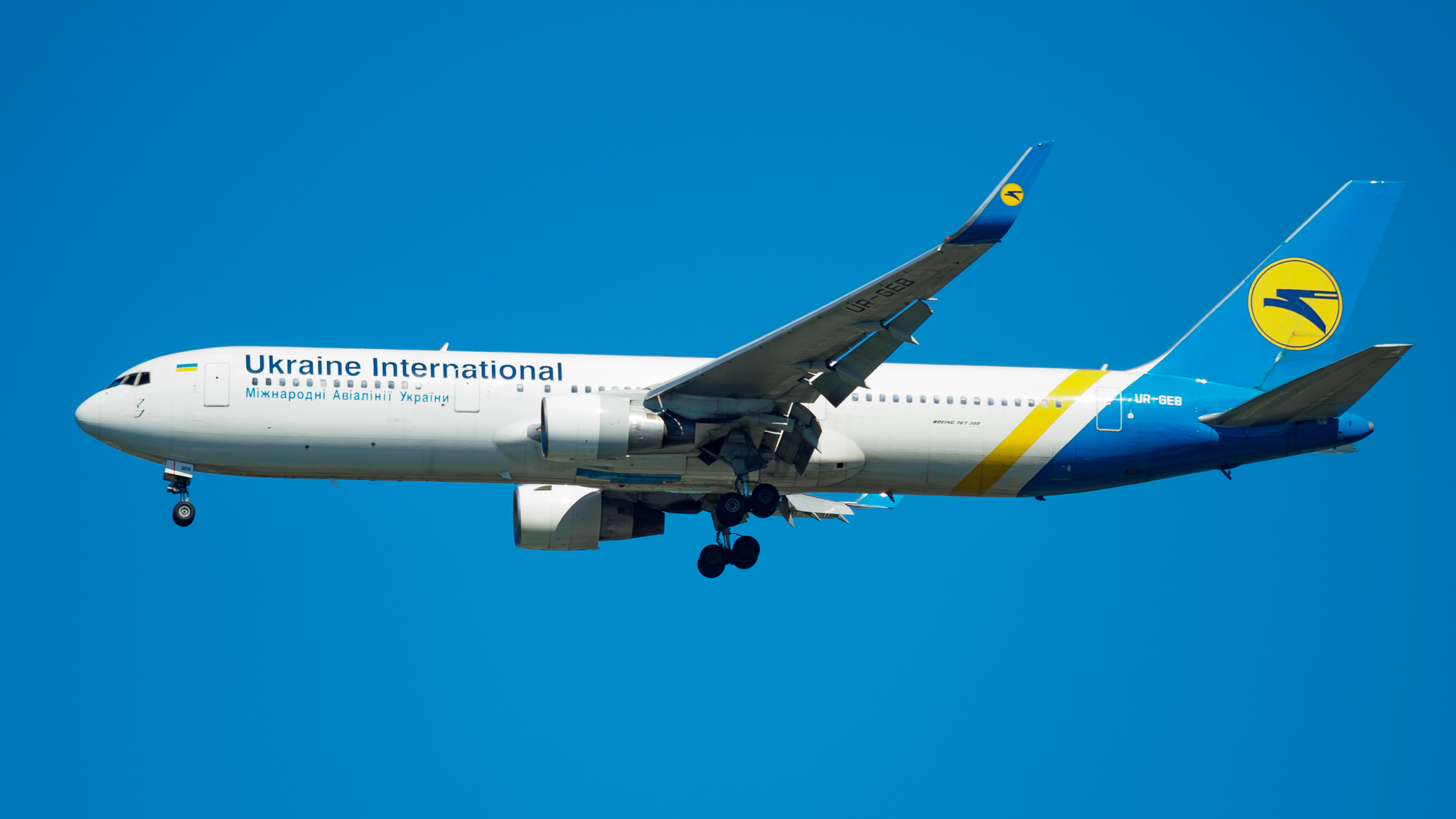
Boeing 767-300

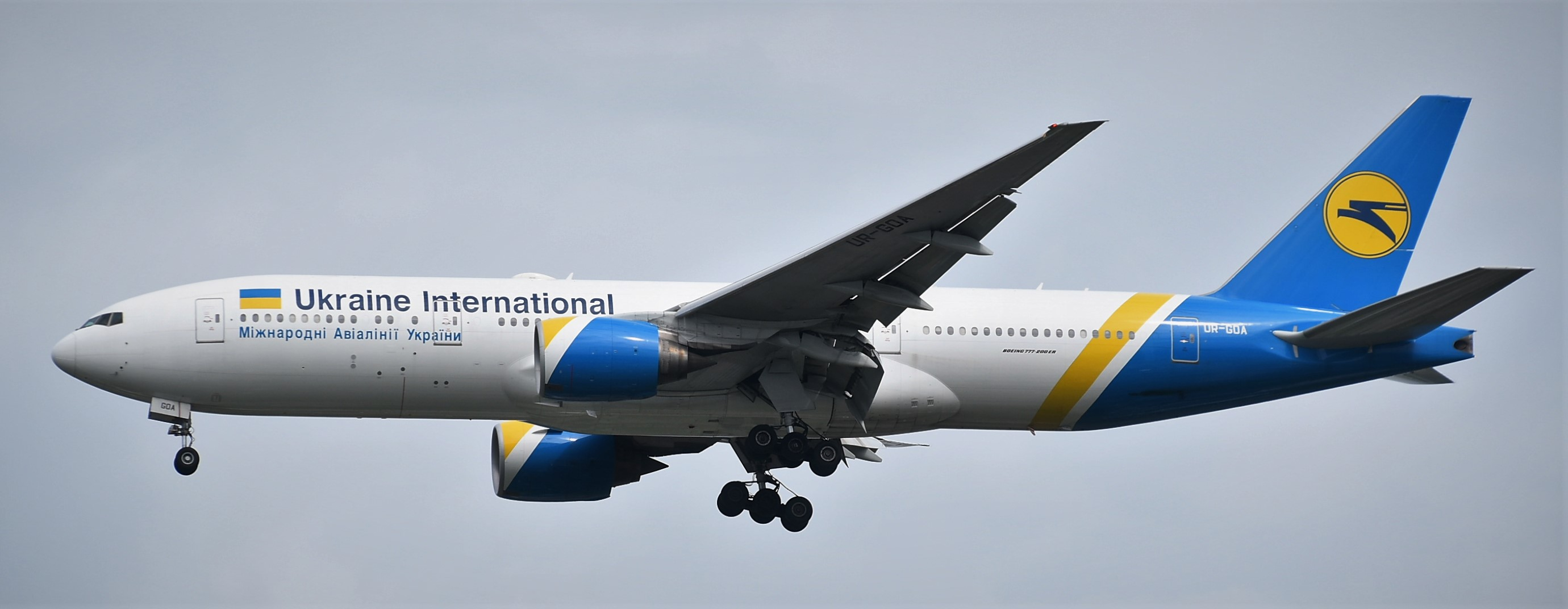
Boeing 777-200ER

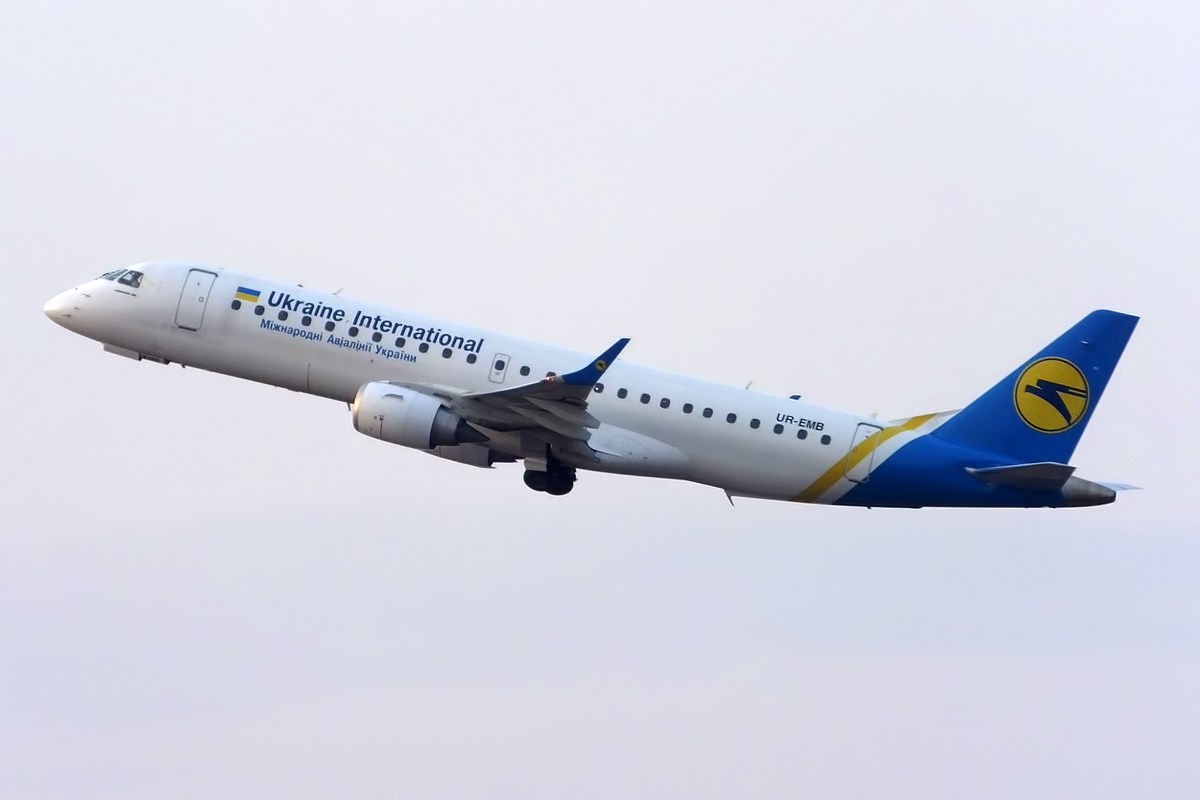
Embraer ERJ-190

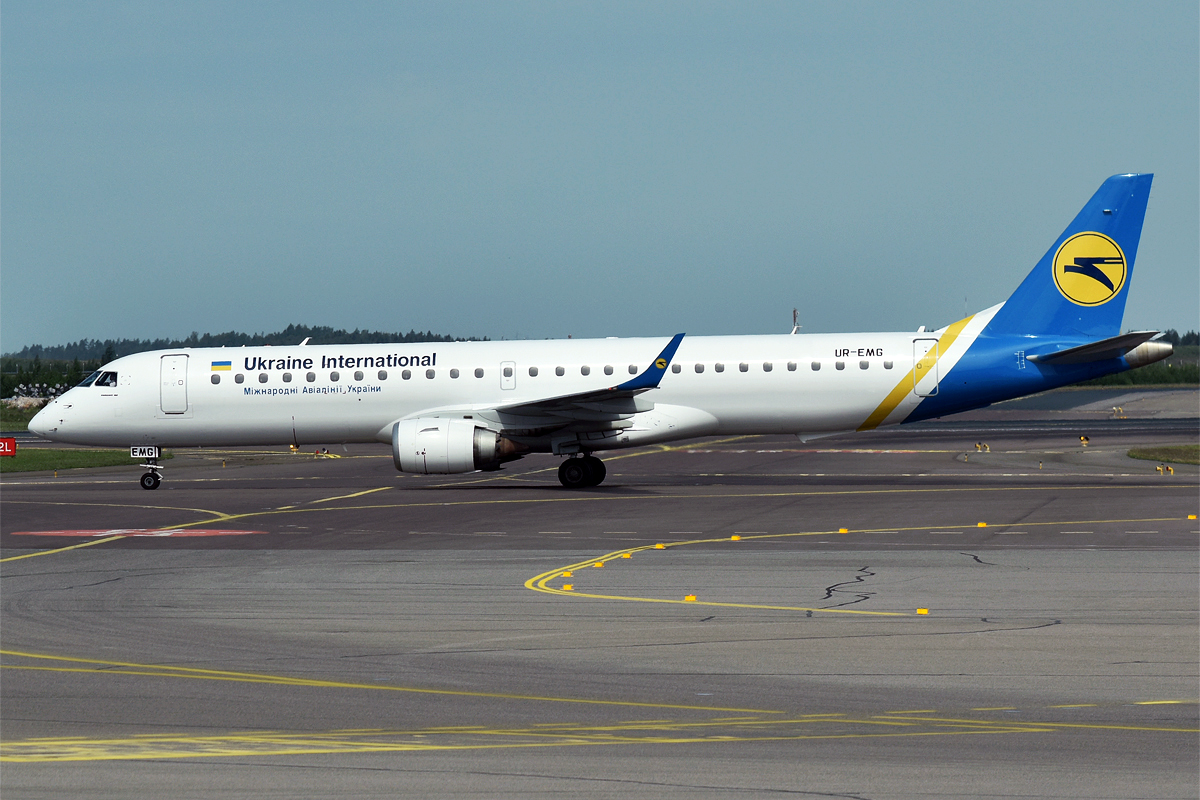
Embraer ERJ-195

== Accidents and incidents ==
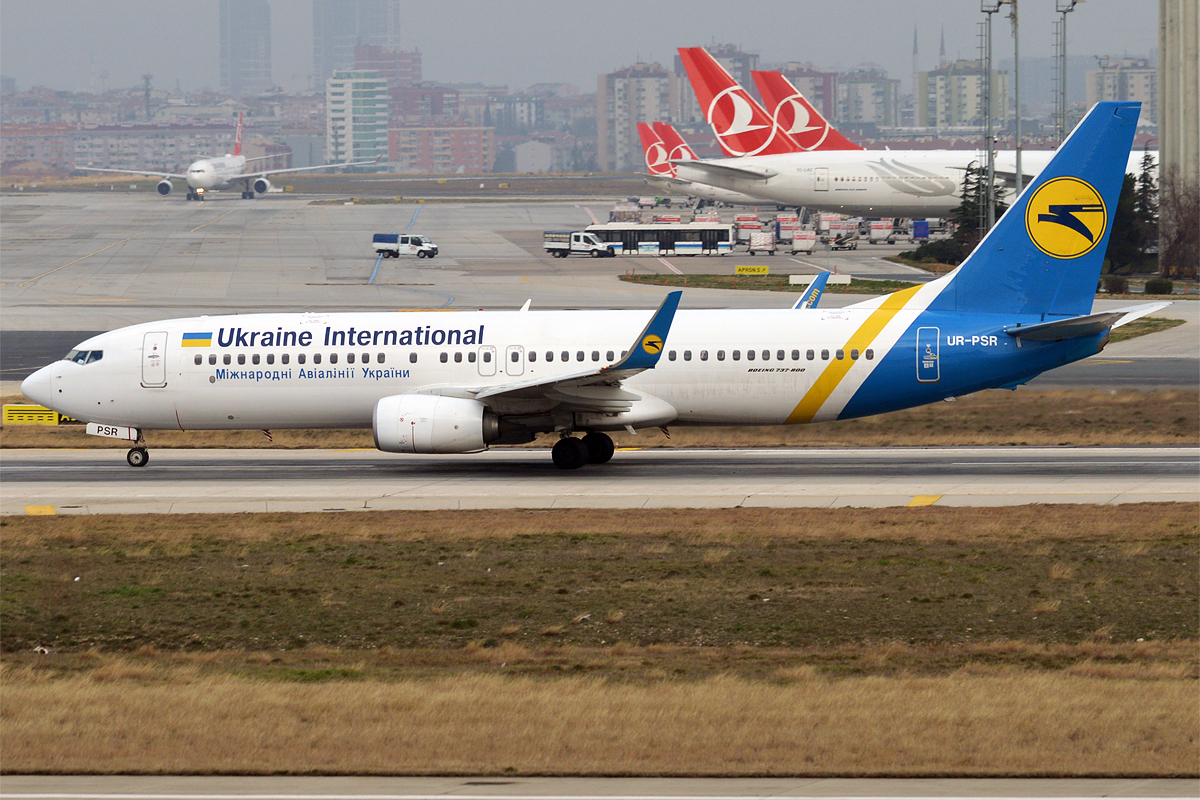
UR-PSR, the aircraft that was shot down as Flight 752

On 8 January 2020, Ukraine International Airlines Flight 752 was shot down by the Islamic Revolutionary Guard Corps (IRGC) of Iran shortly after takeoff from Tehran Imam Khomeini International Airport. The IRGC attributed it to human error. The aircraft involved, UR-PSR, was a three-year-old Boeing 737-800. All 167 passengers and 9 crew members on board died. The crash was the first and only fatal crash in the history of Ukraine International Airlines.

== See also ==
- List of airlines of Ukraine
- Transport in Ukraine
