= Bravo Airways =

Ukrainian airline

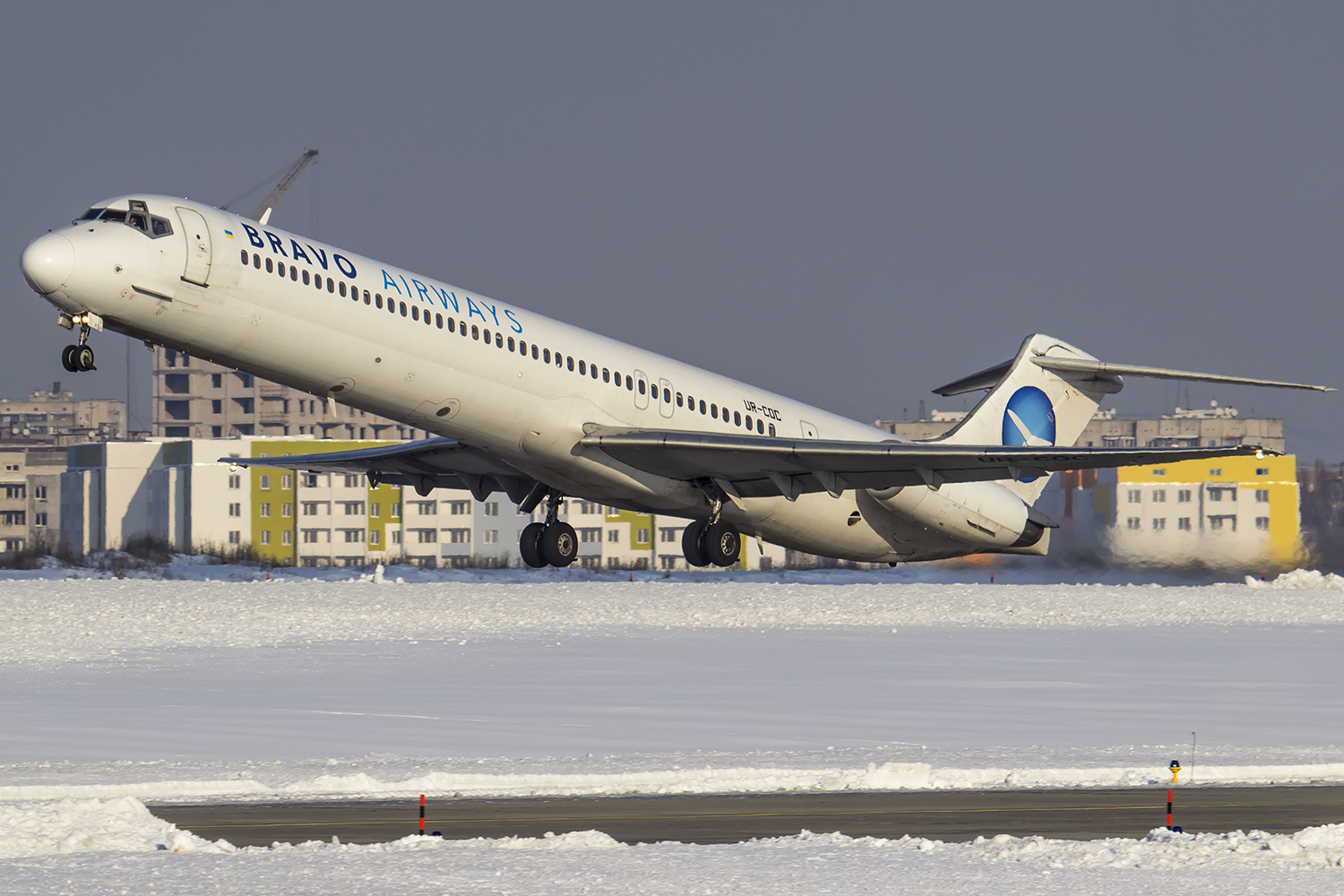
- A Bravo Airways MD-83 at Kharkiv International Airport
| IATA | ICAO | Call sign |
|---|---|---|
| - | BAY | - |
- Founded: April 2012
- Ceased operations: May 15, 2024
- Hubs: Kyiv-Boryspil Airport
- Fleet size: 1
- Destinations: 5
- Headquarters: Ukraine
- Website: bravoairways.kiev.ua

Bravo Airways was a Ukrainian charter airline based at Kyiv Zhuliany International Airport.

== History ==
In May 2019, the airline announced the end of all charter operations. A Bravo Airways Boeing 737-500 and one of their McDonnell Douglas MD-83s were seized in Kyiv and put on auction in July 2021.

In 2015, the FlyErbil brand was launched, with its aim to connect Iraqi Kurdistan to Europe via Ukraine. The airline was founded in 2015, but there was a three-year delay before its first launch due to the ISIL offensive in northern Iraq. Flights were operated by two Boeing 737 aircraft with FlyErbil branding, but remained registered in Ukraine.

In May 2019 Bravo Airways ended all charter flights.

From 2021 to 2022, the assets of the company was auctioned off. On 15 May 2024, Bravo Airways was declared bankrupt and liquidated by the Kyiv City Commercial Court.

== Destinations ==
Iran

- Tehran - Tehran Imam Khomeini International Airport

Jordan

- Amman - Queen Alia International Airport

Lebanon

- Beirut - Beirut–Rafic Hariri International Airport

Ukraine

- Kharkiv - Kharkiv International Airport seasonal
- Kyiv - Boryspil International Airport base

== Fleet ==
=== Current fleet ===
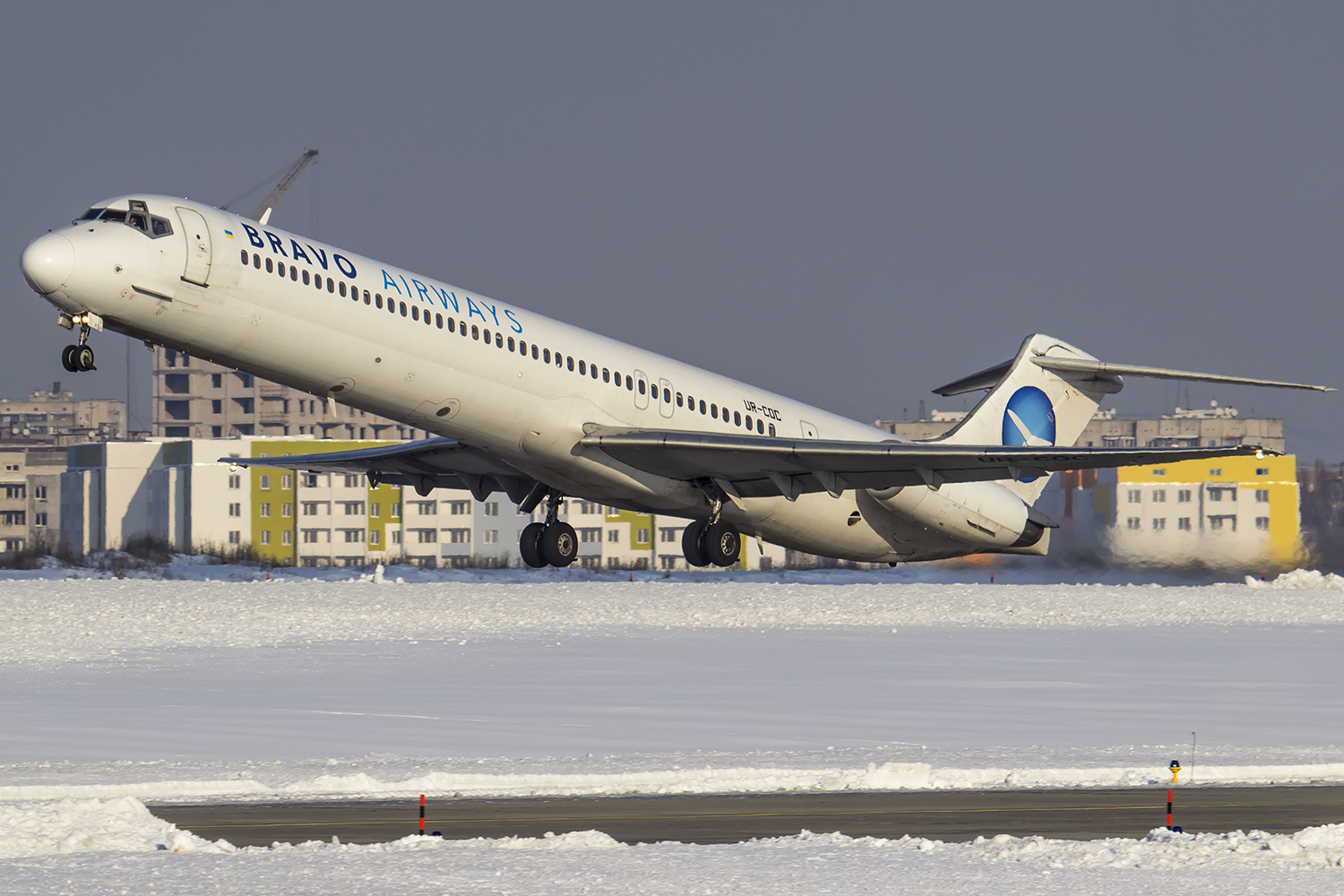
Bravo Airways McDonnell Douglas MD-83. This aircraft was seized in Kyiv and put on auction in July 2021.

As of August 2025, Bravo Airways operates the following aircraft:

Bravo Airways fleet
| Aircraft | In service | Orders | Passengers | Notes |
|---|---|---|---|---|
| Boeing 737-500 | 1 | — | | |
| Total | 1 | — | | |

=== Former fleet ===
- Boeing 737-300
- Boeing 737-500
- 1 McDonnell Douglas MD-82
- McDonnell Douglas MD-83

== Incidents and accidents ==
- On 14 June 2018, Bravo Airways Flight 4406, a McDonnell Douglas MD-83 (UR-CPR), incoming from Antalya Airport skidded off the runway after touchdown at Kyiv International Airport (Zhuliany) during difficult weather conditions. All 169 passengers and crew on board were evacuated safely; however, the aircraft sustained severe damage and was written off as beyond economical repair.

== See also ==
- List of airlines of Ukraine
