= Boryspil International Airport =

International airport in Ukraine

Boryspil International Airport Міжнародний аеропорт «Бориспіль»

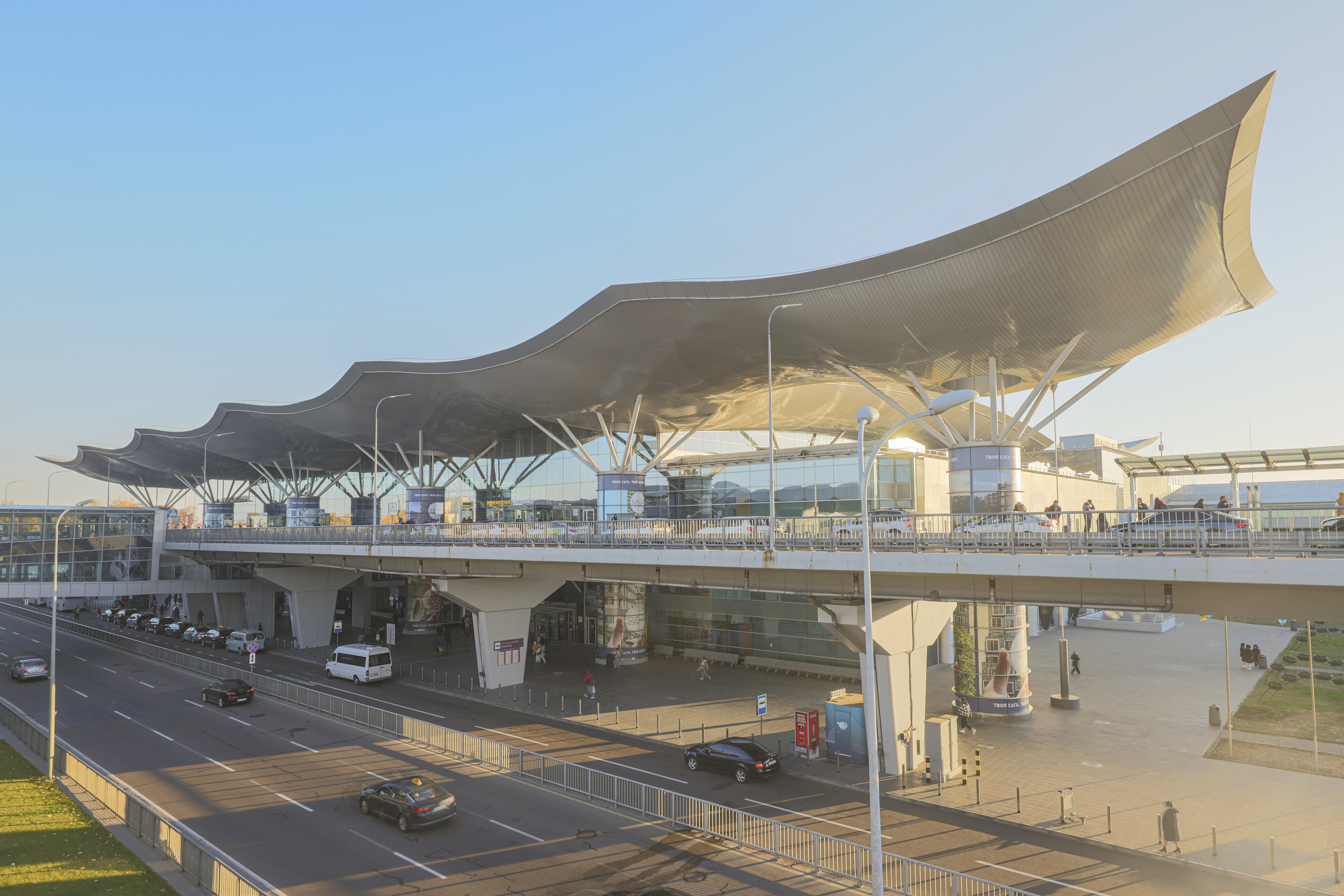
- IATA: KBP; ICAO: UKBB

Summary
- Airport type: Public/Military
- Operator: Civil Government
- Serves: Kyiv, Ukraine
- Location: Boryspil
- Hub for: SkyUp; Ukraine International Airlines
- Focus city for: Windrose Airlines
- Elevation AMSL: 130 m (430 ft)
- Coordinates: 50°20′41″N 30°53′36″E
- Website: kbp.aero

Maps
- Location in Kyiv Oblast KBP (Ukraine)
- Interactive map of Boryspil International Airport

Runways
Direction	Length		Surface
Direction	m	ft	Surface
18L/36R	4,000	13,123	Concrete
18R/36L	3,500	11,483	Concrete

Statistics (2019)
- Passengers: ▲15,260,300
- Flights: ▲110,000
- Source: Official website Ukrainian AIP at EUROCONTROL; Statistics: Airport Press

Boryspil International Airport (Ukrainian: Міжнародний аеропорт «Бориспіль») (IATA: KBP, ICAO: UKBB), also known as Kyiv Boryspil Airport, is an international airport in Boryspil, 29 km (18 mi) east of Kyiv, the capital of Ukraine. It is Ukraine's largest airport, which served 65% of its passenger air traffic before the Russian invasion began, including all its intercontinental flights and a majority of international flights. It is one of two passenger airports that serve Kyiv along with the smaller Zhuliany Airport. Boryspil International Airport was a member of Airports Council International. Since 24 February 2022, the airport has not operated any scheduled, charter or cargo flights due to the Russian invasion.

== History ==
=== Early years ===
On 22 June 1959, the Council of Ministers of the Ukrainian SSR ordered the establishment of regular civil air traffic to the then military airfield near Boryspil. On 7 July 1959, the new airport (named Kyiv-Tsentralnyi) received its first scheduled flight. It was Aeroflot's Tupolev Tu-104 en route from Moscow, carrying 100 passengers and about 1,600 kilograms (3,500 lb) of cargo. The first routes served were Moscow–Kyiv-Moscow and Leningrad–Kyiv–Leningrad.

In November 1960, the first permanent air group, consisting of Tu-104 and Antonov An-10 planes, was assigned to the airport. Until then it had been served only by aircraft based in Moscow and other cities of the Soviet Union. A new passenger terminal was opened in 1965. Later that year, an automatic landing assistance system was installed.

In 1963, the Ukrainian Territorial Administration of Civil Aviation formed its Boryspil subdivision consisting of the airport and its air group. The air group grew significantly in the 1960s and 1970s. In 1974 it consisted of four fleets of turbojet aircraft (Tu-104 planes), turbofan aircraft (Tu-134, Tu-154 planes) and two fleets of turboprop aircraft (Ilyushin Il-18 planes).

Toward the final decades of the Cold War, the Soviet Air Force maintained a presence at Boryspil Airport with 1 VTAP (1st Military Aviation Transportation Regiment) flying Ilyushin Il-76 cargo jets.

By the 1980s, Boryspil had begun receiving limited international flights. Additional passenger services and customs/border control groups were established for that purpose. However, ordinary Soviet citizens were not allowed to depart abroad from Kyiv, being restricted to fly only from Moscow airports.

=== Development since the 1990s ===
Aeroflot added direct service to New York in 1991. Two years later, the Ministry of Transportation of the newly independent Ukraine reorganized the airport into the Boryspil State International Airport and created a local subdivision of Air Ukraine to serve it. The airport was subject to a $15 million facelift by a construction consortium led by MDA – A Dublin-based contractor headed by Ronnie Petrie – with designs by UK consultants Mark Homer Design and opened for domestic and international passengers and flights. The number of air and passenger traffic has been growing ever since.

Early in the 2000s, Boryspil became a hub airport serving destined and transit flights of foreign airlines. Its development strategy stresses the hub role since domestic passenger demand is growing insufficiently compared to the possible transit traffic. In 2001, a new runway was completed, and the airport carried 1.5 million passengers. It is certified for Category III A ILS approaches. In 2002, Boryspil airport was certified under the ISO 9001 quality management system.

It is one of Eastern Europe's largest airports with over 6 million passengers traveling in 2008. It consistently accounted for between 60% and 70% of Ukraine's air travel demand and, despite a drop of 13% in 2009, it handled 5.8 million passengers, more than it handled in 2007.

The airport survived the 2012 European cold wave without major flight delays or cancellations. According to the media and industry experts, in 2013 once underdog in-city Zhuliany Airport has rapidly grown into a major, and more efficient, competitor to the still-leading Boryspil Airport.

Boryspil International Airport handles most of Ukraine's international traffic. Terminal B, with only eleven gates, two of which were air bridges, was not enough to handle all international flights. This was the reason for the expansion of that terminal, which started in 2005. The first-stage expansion of Terminal B was opened on 27 January 2006. In 2008, passport control within Terminal B Departures was moved further east (along with the entrance to the main duty-free shop so that it remains airside).

There are plans to expand the airport further by building several new terminals. The government has been having meetings with the owners of nearby land, trying to buy more land for expansion. The construction of Terminal D was approved on 28 July 2008 and was completed in 2012 at a cost of ₴1.661 billion (US$208 million). The terminal will have a capacity of 1,500 passengers per hour and cover an area of 44.9 hectares. Platform M, which is connected to Terminal B, was to be reconstructed in 2009–2010. The reason for the delay in its reconstruction was that Terminal B needs to be fully operational first. After Terminal D opened (building began on 24 October 2008), platform M can be reconstructed without having a major impact on traffic.

The construction of Terminal D was completed in 2012, with the terminal opening to passengers on 28 May 2012, increasing passenger handling facilities significantly. Terminal A, B, and F were taken out of operation in 2016. Expansion plans were estimated to handle a capacity of 18 million passengers per year.

=== Suspension of operations (2022–present) ===
On 24 February 2022, Ukraine closed its airspace to civilian flights due to the Russian invasion of Ukraine, thus closing the airport. Shortly afterward, the airport was hit by Russian missiles targeting Ukrainian infrastructure. As of August 2025, the airspace is still closed, and commercial air travel across Ukraine remains suspended.

== Terminals and infrastructure ==
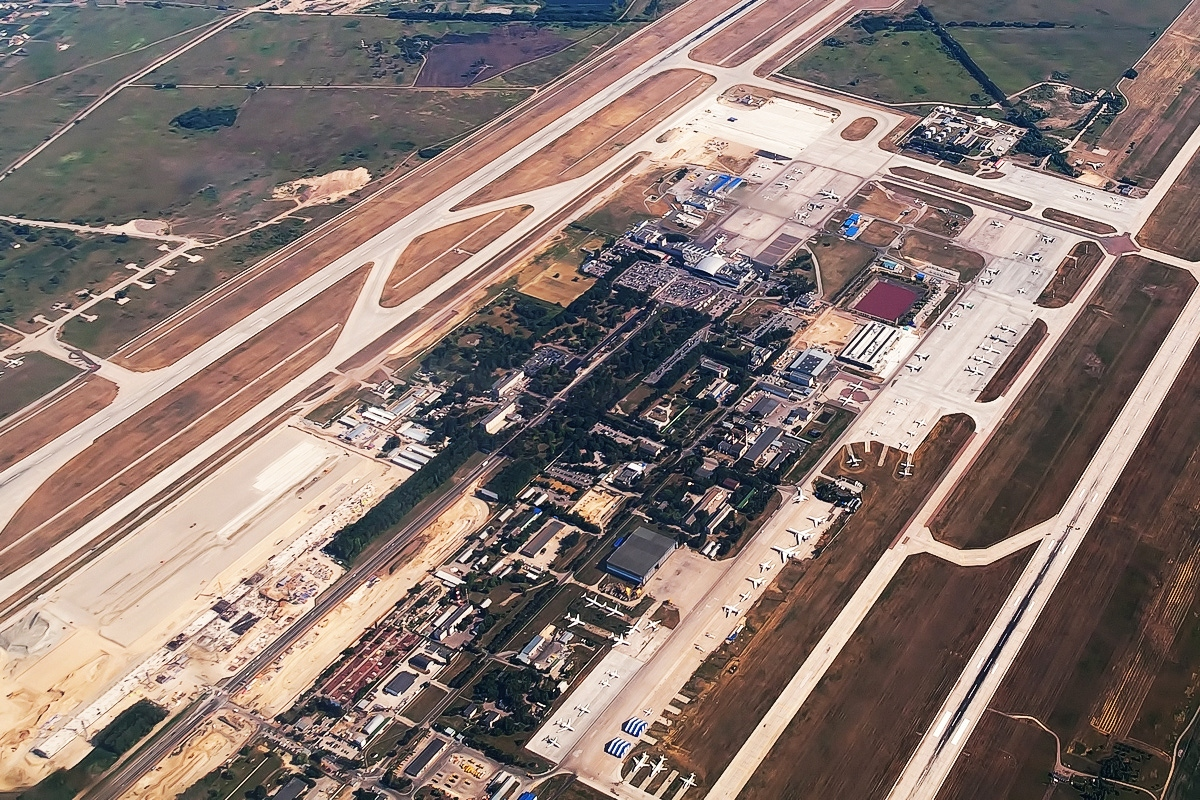
Aerial overview of the airport's grounds

=== Terminals ===
Boryspil International Airport has two operational passenger terminals (D) and (F), one cargo terminal, and a VIP terminal. The largely overcrowded former domestic Terminal A was closed on 15 September 2011, in favor of transferring all domestic operations to nearby Terminal B. In 2013, all domestic and international operations were transferred from Terminal B to Terminal D.

Terminal A

Terminal "A" specialized in servicing air passengers traveling through the territory of Ukraine. There was a waiting room (2nd floor), toilet (ground floor), currency exchange offices and air tickets. The terminal also housed representative offices of domestic airlines. There were cafes and guarded car parks near Terminal A, as well as airport lockers.

Most flights were operated by AeroSvit and Dniproavia, and Terminal A also served domestic flights of passengers of Ukraine International Airlines and Motor-Sich.

From 15 September 2011, all domestic flights from Boryspil are operated from Terminal B, and Terminal A is closed. Minister of Transport and Communications of Ukraine Kostiantyn Yefimenko said that in 2018, terminals "A" and "B" of Boryspil Airport are planned to be demolished to build a new terminal.

==== Terminal B ====
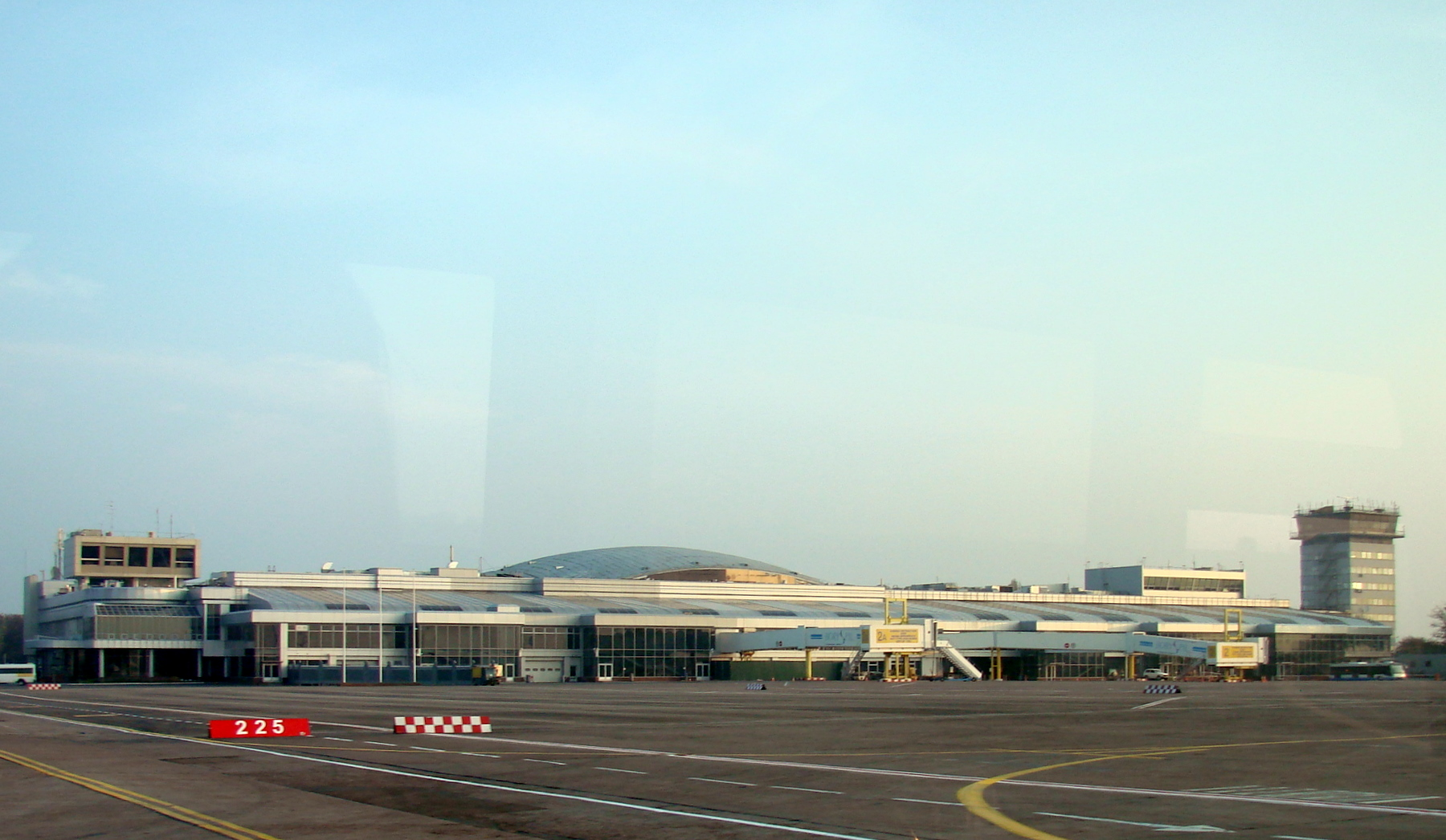
Terminal B

Terminal B, the original Soviet-constructed building, used to serve domestic and international flights. It has undergone extensive, long-term reconstruction. The terminal hosted shops, cafes, travel agencies and banks, as well as offices of airlines and a business center. The ground floor features luggage storage, waiting-area, and check-in desks, whilst security and passport (immigration) control, the main departure lounge and the terminal's boarding gates are on the second floor.

After passport control, passengers wait in the departure lounge where there is a business lounge, a number of cafes, restaurants and duty-free shops. There is free Wi-Fi access in the building. The terminal has two jetbridges and several bus-boarding stands. It is now used for charter flights for Hasidic Pilgrims participating in Rosh Hashanah kibbutz in Ukraine.

==== Terminal D ====
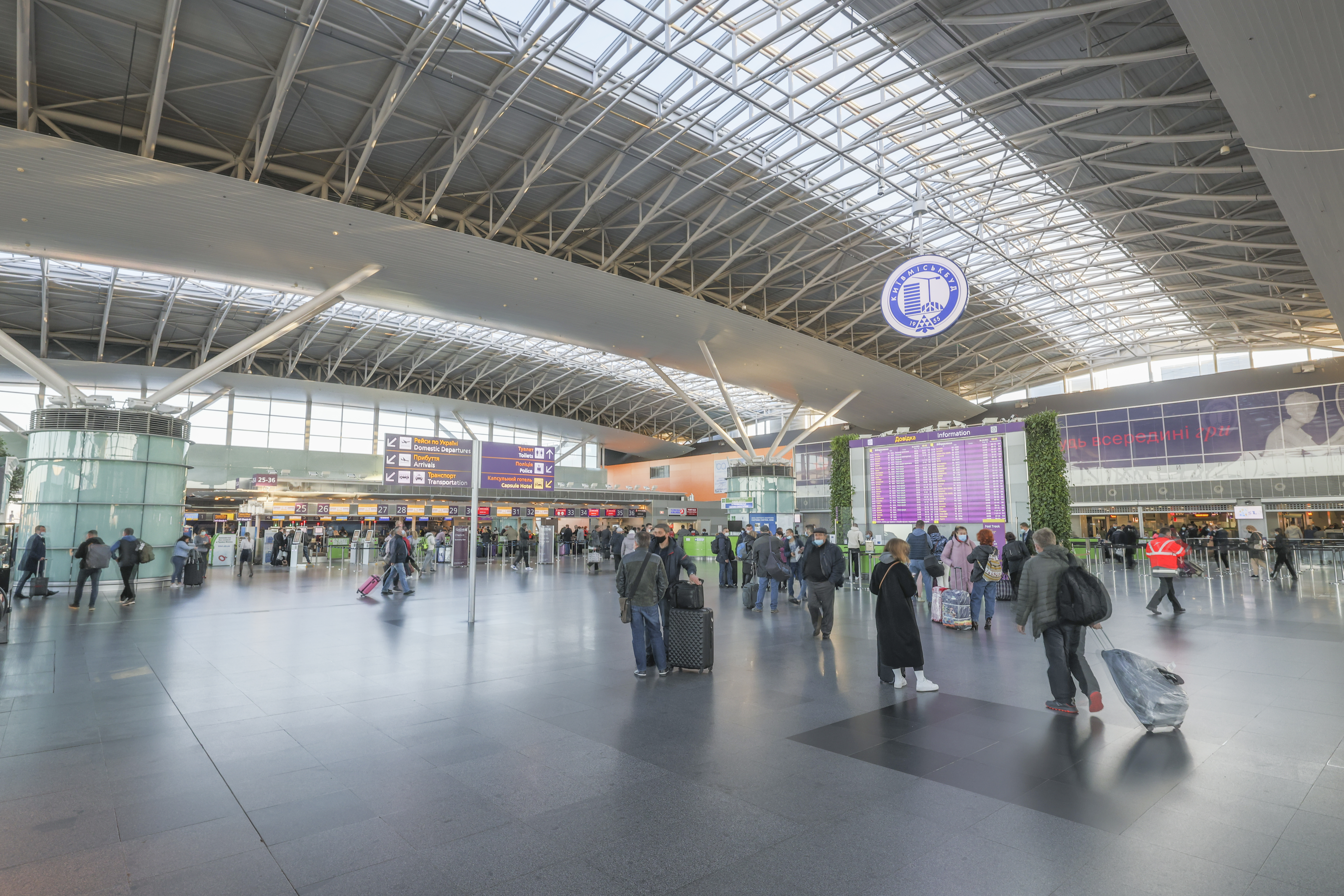
The interior of Terminal D

Terminal D, construction of which began on 24 March 2008, was opened on 28 May 2012 with an initial capacity of 3,100 passengers per hour. It received its first arrivals passengers on 29 May 2012.

Terminal D serves domestic and international flights. It is also a hub and a home base of Ukraine International Airlines. It has been designed to support an integrated system for monitoring and directing arriving and departing passengers. This has been ensured by implementing a scheme of movement based on the principle of multi-level zoning — departing passengers use the airport's upper floors, whilst those arriving and yet to pass through immigration are processed on a lower level. The ground and first floors are used for airside service and the sorting of baggage.

Airside, the first floor is used for arrivals zone and baggage hall. The fourth floor is reserved for airlines' lounges. The terminal can be accessed from the airport's central access road for arrivals and in the same way but via a ramp for departures level. The building features both jetbridges and bus boarding stands and is equipped to handle wide-body aircraft such as Ukraine International Airlines' Boeing 777-200ERs.

The Ukrainian Border Guard and State Customs Service maintain control points for arriving and departing passengers (40 passport booths for arrivals and 28 for departures). The terminal has 11 gates equipped with jetways and additional 'bus gates'.

Terminal D regularly features Ukrainian art exhibitions by such notables as Maria Prymachenko and Yuriy Khimich, organised by the art fund "Artaniya".

==== Terminal F ====
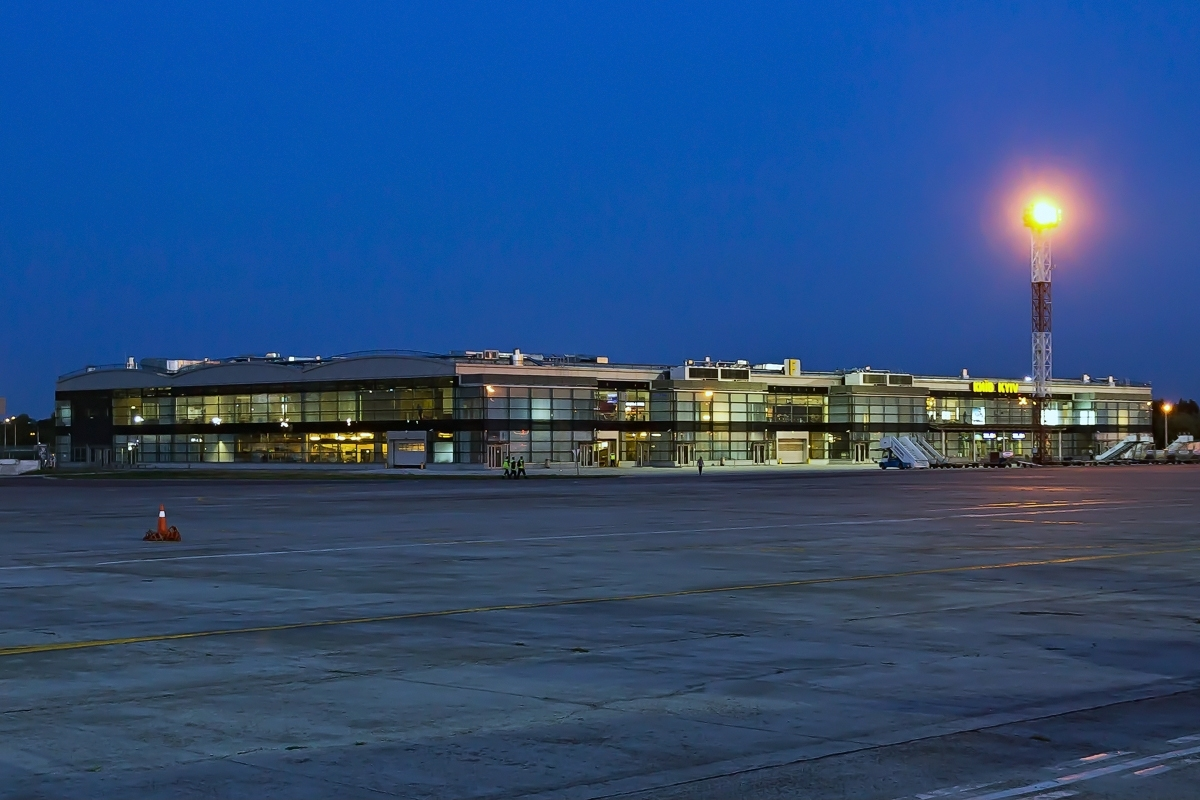
Terminal F

Terminal F is a passenger terminal mostly used by low-cost carriers and was opened on 21 September 2010 as a home base for Ukraine International Airlines. Terminal F started handling regular flights as of 31 October 2010, with an initial capacity of 900 passengers/hour. The terminal is not equipped with jetways as it was originally meant to serve low-cost airlines. However, the higher level of service offered led to the transfer of many scheduled European and Asian carriers to the terminal.

The opening of Terminal F greatly reduced the overcrowding at Terminal B, which had previously been Boryspil's only operating international terminal. Upon opening of Terminal F and expansion/reconfiguration of Terminal B's airside departures to serve domestic flights, the airport was able to close the largely outdated domestic Terminal A.

This terminal served UTair-Ukraine, airBaltic, Armavia, Austrian Airlines, Belavia, British Airways, LOT Polish Airlines, Georgian Airways, Libyan Airlines, Lufthansa, Finnair, KLM, S7 Airlines, Turkish Airlines and others. All of them were transferred to Terminal D. Ukraine International Airlines transferred all of its regular flights to Terminal D on 30 May 2013 but UIA's charter flights stayed in Terminal F. It was expected that Terminal F would be also used for low-cost carriers.

In October 2013, the terminal was used for charter flights and low-cost airlines. It serviced three or four, sometimes eight, flights a day. On 15 October 2013, airport management decided that terminal F will be used as a cargo terminal in the future. On 27 October 2013, all flights were transferred from terminal F to terminal D.

Terminal F was reopened on 31 March 2019, and is used as a passenger facility for low-cost carriers, especially Ryanair. The following airlines have confirmed their move to Terminal F: Ryanair, Yanair, Bravo Airways, Iraqi Airways, SkyUp, Aigle Azur and Air Serbia.

=== Infrastructure ===
Boryspil airport has two runways, with the terminals occupying a center-field location.

- The eastern No. 1 runway (36R-18L) built in 2001 serves majority of flights.
- The western No. 2 runway (36L-18R).

In the long term, there are plans to build a third crosswind runway.

Short-stay car parking facilities at are provided in the immediate vicinity of terminals B and F, whilst long term parking facilities are in the vicinity of the airport's access road and 'station square'. In addition to these facilities, the airport is, in connection with the construction of Terminal D, building its first multi-storey car park; this will be a combined long- and short-stay car park.

== Airlines and destinations ==
=== Passenger ===
Since 24 February 2022, all passenger flights have been suspended indefinitely due to the Russian invasion of Ukraine. Before that date, the following airlines offered regular scheduled and charter services to and from Boryspil International Airport.

Airlines	Destinations
Air Arabia	Sharjah
Air Astana	Almaty, Astana
Air France	Paris–Charles de Gaulle
AirBaltic	Riga, Vilnius
AJet	Ankara
Austrian Airlines	Vienna
Azerbaijan Airlines	Baku
Bravo Airways	Amman–Queen Alia, Beirut
El Al	Tel Aviv
Eurowings	Düsseldorf
Flydubai	Dubai–International
FlyOne	Seasonal: Chișinău
KLM	Amsterdam
Lufthansa	Frankfurt, Munich
Pegasus Airlines	Ankara; Seasonal: Bodrum, Izmir
Qatar Airways	Doha
Ryanair	Athens, Barcelona, Bergamo, Berlin, Bologna, Bratislava, Bydgoszcz, Catania, Cologne/Bonn, Dublin, Gdańsk, Hahn, Katowice, Kraków, London–Stansted, Madrid, Malta, Manchester, Naples, Paphos, Poznań, Riga, Rome–Fiumicino, Sofia, Treviso, Turin, Valencia, Vienna, Vilnius, Warsaw–Modlin, Weeze, Wrocław; Seasonal: Chania
Scandinavian Airlines	Oslo
Skyline Express	Seasonal: Barcelona; Charter: Hurghada, Sharm El Sheikh; Seasonal charter: Antalya, Bodrum, Burgas, Dalaman, Enfidha, La Romana, Nha Trang, Punta Cana
SkyUp	Alicante, Almaty, Athens, Barcelona, Batumi, Beauvais, Berlin, Dammam, Dubai–International, Funchal, Istanbul, Jeddah, Larnaca, Lisbon, Łódź, Madrid, Munich, Nice, Prague, Riyadh, Tbilisi, Tel Aviv, Valencia, Yerevan; Seasonal: Bahrain, Bergamo, Bodrum, Burgas, Catania, Colombo–Bandaranaike, Dalaman, Dubrovnik, Faro, Hambantota–Mattala, Heraklion, Izmir, Kos, Kuwait City, Lamezia Terme, Lyon, Málaga, Malta, Marseille, Monastir, Muscat, Naples, Pula, Rhodes, Rimini, Rome–Ciampino, Salzburg, Sofia, Split, Tashkent, Tenerife–South, Tirana, Tivat, Varna, Zakynthos, Zanzibar; Seasonal charter: Antalya, Hurghada, Marsa Alam, Sharm El Sheikh
Swiss International Air Lines	Zürich
Turkish Airlines	Istanbul
Ukraine International Airlines	Amsterdam, Ankara, Athens, Baku, Barcelona, Bergamo, Berlin, Brussels, Budapest, Cairo, Chișinău, Copenhagen, Delhi, Dnipro, Dubai–International, Düsseldorf, Geneva, Helsinki, Istanbul, Ivano-Frankivsk, Kharkiv, Kherson, Larnaca, London–Gatwick, Lviv, Madrid, Milan–Malpensa, Munich, New York–JFK, Odesa, Oslo, Paris–Charles de Gaulle, Prague, Ras Al Khaimah, Rome–Fiumicino, Sofia, Stockholm–Arlanda, Tbilisi, Tel Aviv, Toronto–Pearson, Venice, Yerevan, Zaporizhzhia, Zürich; Seasonal: Alicante, Izmir, Pula, Split, Tirana; Seasonal charter: Antalya, Bodrum, Cancún, Dalaman, Hambantota–Mattala, Kayseri, La Romana, Malé, Marsa Alam, Rhodes, Sharm El Sheikh,
Vueling	Paris–Orly
Windrose Airlines	Belgrade, Dnipro, Ivano-Frankivsk, Kharkiv, Ljubljana, Lviv, Odesa, Sofia, Uzhhorod, Zagreb, Zaporizhzhia; Seasonal: Bodrum, Burgas, Dubrovnik, Mykolaiv, Pula, Rhodes, Split

=== Cargo ===
Airlines	Destinations
Turkish Cargo	Budapest, Istanbul

== Statistics ==
Year	Passengers	Change on previous year	Boryspil International Airport Passenger Totals
2004	3,168,000	▲35.0%	
2005	3,930,000	▲24.1%	
2006	4,618,000	▲17.6%	
2007	5,671,300	▲22.7%	
2008	6,700,000	▲17.4%	
2009	5,793,000	▼13.0%	
2010	6,692,382	▲15.5%	
2011	8,029,400	▲20.0%	
2012	8,478,000	▲5.0%	
2013	7,930,000	▼6.5%	
2014	6,890,443	▼13.1%	
2015	7,277,135	▲5.6%	
2016	8,650,000	▲18.9%	
2017	10,554,757	▲22.1%	
2018	12,603,271	▲19.4%	
2019	15,260,300	▲21.1%	
2020	5,157,848	▼66.2%	
2021	9,433,000	▲82.9%	

== Other facilities ==
=== VIP and governmental facilities ===
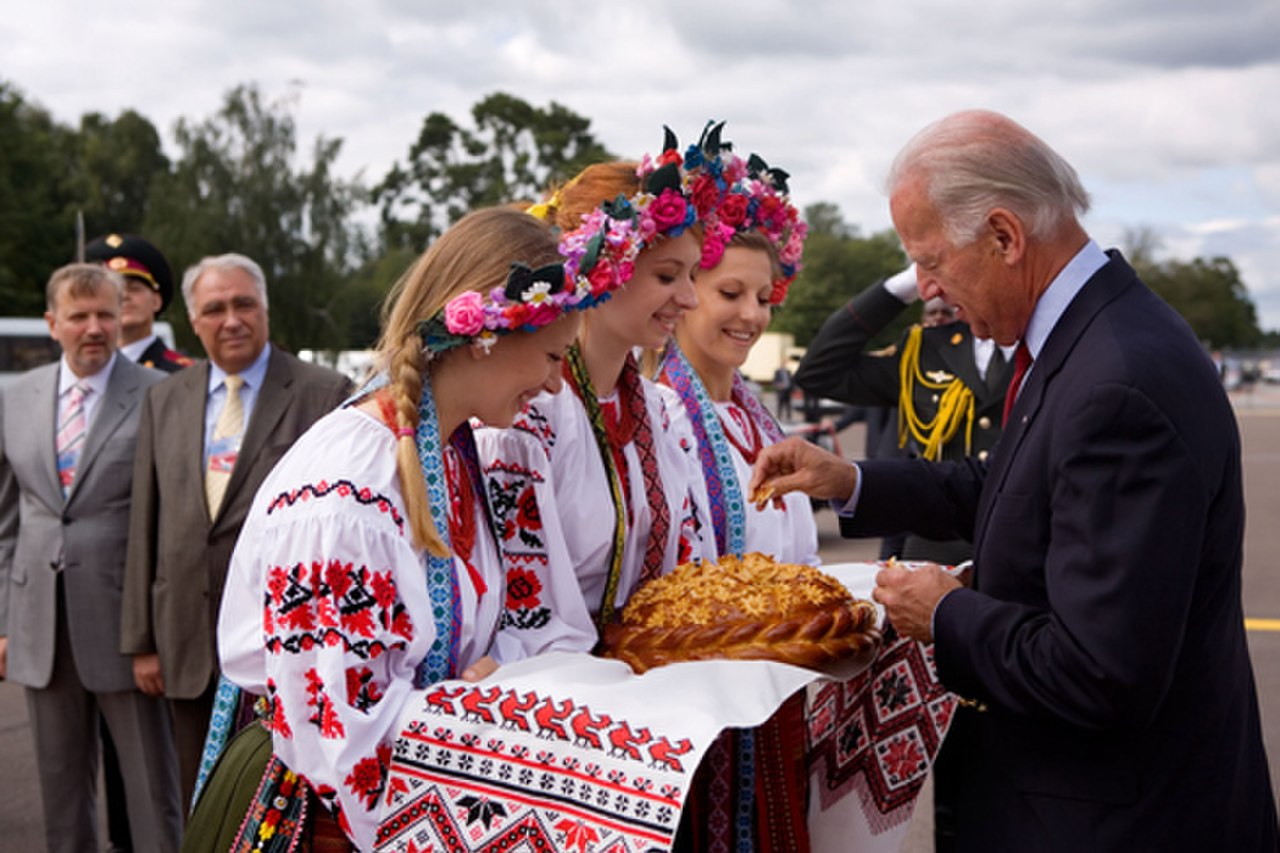
Then-US Vice President Joe Biden on an official visit to Kyiv in 2009. Foreign officials typically land at Boryspil.

A new VIP facility (named 'Boryspil 2') is under construction at the northern end of the east runway. This facility is expected to serve deputes (Members of Parliament) of the Verkhovna Rada, the Ukrainian president, high-ranking members of the Ukrainian government and other domestic and foreign officials and delegates. The terminal will serve Ukrainian officials at a rate of ₴180 per person, whilst others wishing to use its facilities will be expected to pay a minimum of ₴1100.

Plans for the new VIP terminal show that it will cost around ₴350 million and will have the capacity to serve around 150 passengers an hour. Unlike Boryspil's other terminals, the new government/VIP facility will not be accessible from the airport's centre-field access road. Instead, it will have controlled access from the town of Boryspil which will thus allow access to the Boryspil-Kyiv highway.

Terminal D is equipped to cater for other non-government VIP passengers, for whom it provides a separate check-in area, departure lounge, and boarding area.

The Ukrainian government's air fleet (Ukraine Air Enterprise) is based at Boryspil. This fleet compromises one Airbus A319 for the use of the President of Ukraine, two long-haul Ilyushin Il-62 aircraft and a number of smaller aircraft and helicopters for general government use. Currently, these aircraft are based near the covered hangars to the north of Terminal F. With the completion of Boryspil 2, it is expected that the government's dedicated aircraft will move to that facility's apron, thus allowing officials to board/disembark their aircraft with minimum adverse effects on other civil operations.

=== Catering and cargo facilities ===
At Boryspil Airport, for almost 20 years, operates company Aero Catering Services Ukraine and its airline catering facility is a part of the regional and global catering services network LSG Sky Chefs.

On 16 May 2012, a greatly expanded, modern catering facility was opened at the airport. The complex, which is managed by Kyiv Catering, cost around US$25 million to build and is capable of producing up to 25,000 flight-packaged meals a day. The new catering centre was built entirely with private funds supplied by investors, thus making it one of the first investments at Boryspil not part-funded by the state.

Cargo facilities are available at Boryspil airport and located close by is a large logistics center operated by DHL and housing other logistics providers. The Ukrainian Post (Ukrposhta) is a major company operating at Boryspil, whilst the airport can provide cold storage and standard cargo transport.

=== Military facilities ===
The airport also houses the 15th Transport Aviation Brigade.

== Ground transportation ==
=== Rail ===
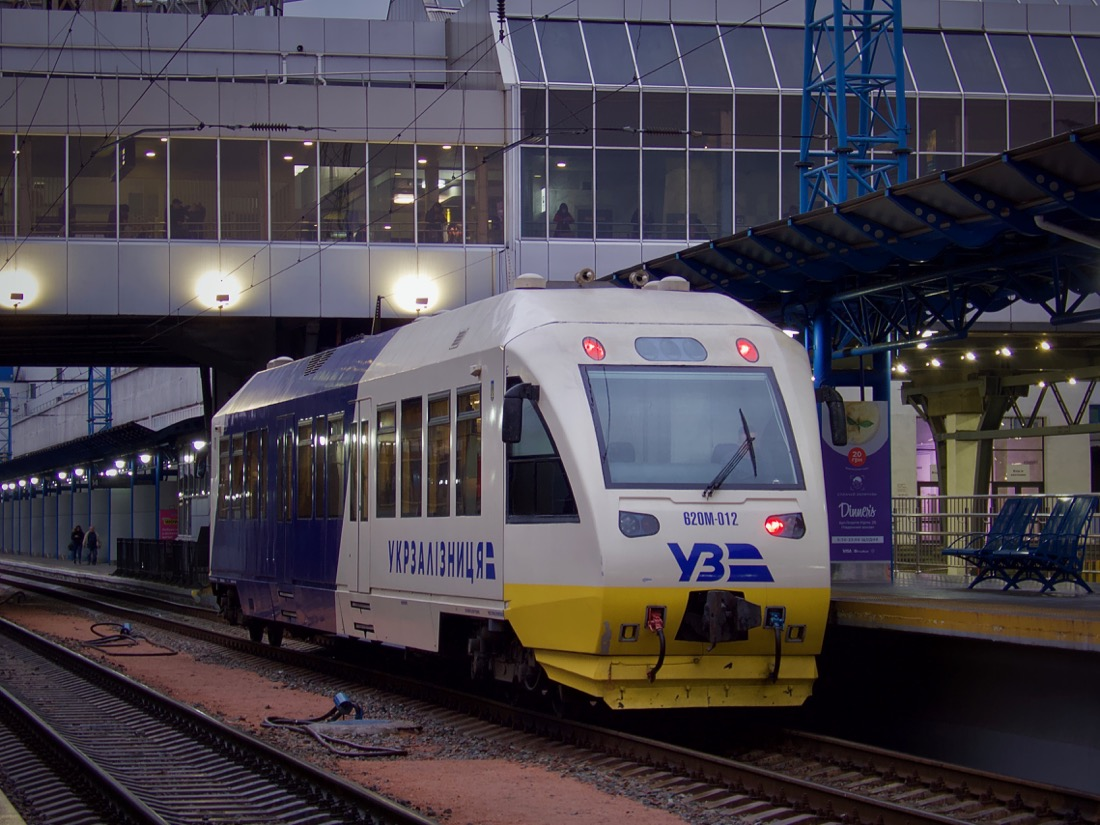
A Kyiv Boryspil Express train at Kyiv Railway Station

On 30 November 2018, Ukrzaliznytsia (Ukrainian Railways) launched an express train from the Kyiv-Pasazhyrskyi Railway Station to Boryspil airport via Darnytsia. Trains run every hour (non-peak) and about every 30 minutes (peak). Journey time one way is about 40 minutes.

=== Road ===
Boryspil airport is connected to Kyiv and its wider metropolitan area through the road network. Its entrance is at the dedicated branch of the M03.

Several bus and minibus lines serve the airport, connecting it to the closest stations of the Syretsko–Pecherska line and the central railway station. The Sky Bus (No. 322) provides regular shuttle services between Kyiv's main railway station and Terminal D of the airport.

Many intercity bus routes to or from Kyiv make dedicated stopovers to cater for airline passengers from other cities. E.g., a Kyiv-Mariupol (southeast-bound) bus would travel from Kyiv Central Bus Station through the airport, while a Kyiv-Lviv (southwest-bound) bus would start in the airport and then proceed to Lviv through the Central Bus Station in Kyiv. Overall, at least 35 intercity bus routes transit Boryspil Airport. All long-distance and Kyiv-bound buses arrive at the airport's bus station near the "B" terminal.

Boryspil has a number of long-stay guarded car parks as well as designated drop-off points and taxi stands. Taxis can be booked for a set price at counters inside the terminal buildings. Uber operates in Ukraine since 2016.

== Accidents and incidents ==
- On 16 September 1971, a Tu-134 of Malev on approach to Kyiv suffered a generator failure that forced the crew to switch to batteries for power supply. The foggy weather then forced the crew to abort two approaches. Upon landing, the Tupolev crashed and broke up. There were 41 passenger fatalities and 8 amongst the crew, with no survivors.
- In 1976, a Tu-154 of Aeroflot sustained structural damage during a heavy landing. The aircraft was withdrawn and is now preserved at the Ukraine State Aviation Museum. There were no fatalities.
- In 1976, a Tu-104 of Aeroflot overshot the runway after its engines had been turned off in flight. There were no fatalities although the aircraft was damaged beyond repair and written off.
- On 5 September 1992, an Air Ukraine Tu-154 had taken-off from Kyiv when its undercarriage failed to retract properly. The crew decided to return. However, on the approach, the left-hand main gear failed to extend. An emergency landing was carried out. There were no fatalities amongst the 147 passengers or crew. The aircraft was written off.
- On 5 September 2004, an An-12 of the Antonov Design Bureau ran off the runway, causing the undercarriage to collapse. The aircraft was then written off as damaged beyond repair. There were no fatalities.
- On 31 August 2020, a female passenger onboard Ukraine International Airlines Flight 6212 illegally opened the aircraft's emergency exit door and began walking on the wing of the aircraft while it was taxiing to cool off. The woman was later banned from flying with the airline.
- During the 2022 Russian invasion of Ukraine, the airport was attacked on the first day of hostilities.

== See also ==
- List of airports in Ukraine
- List of the busiest airports in Ukraine
- List of the busiest airports in Europe
- List of the busiest airports in the former USSR
