= List of Uzbekistan Airways destinations =

As of March 2023, Uzbekistan Airways flies to the following list of destinations. Terminated destinations are also listed.

== List ==
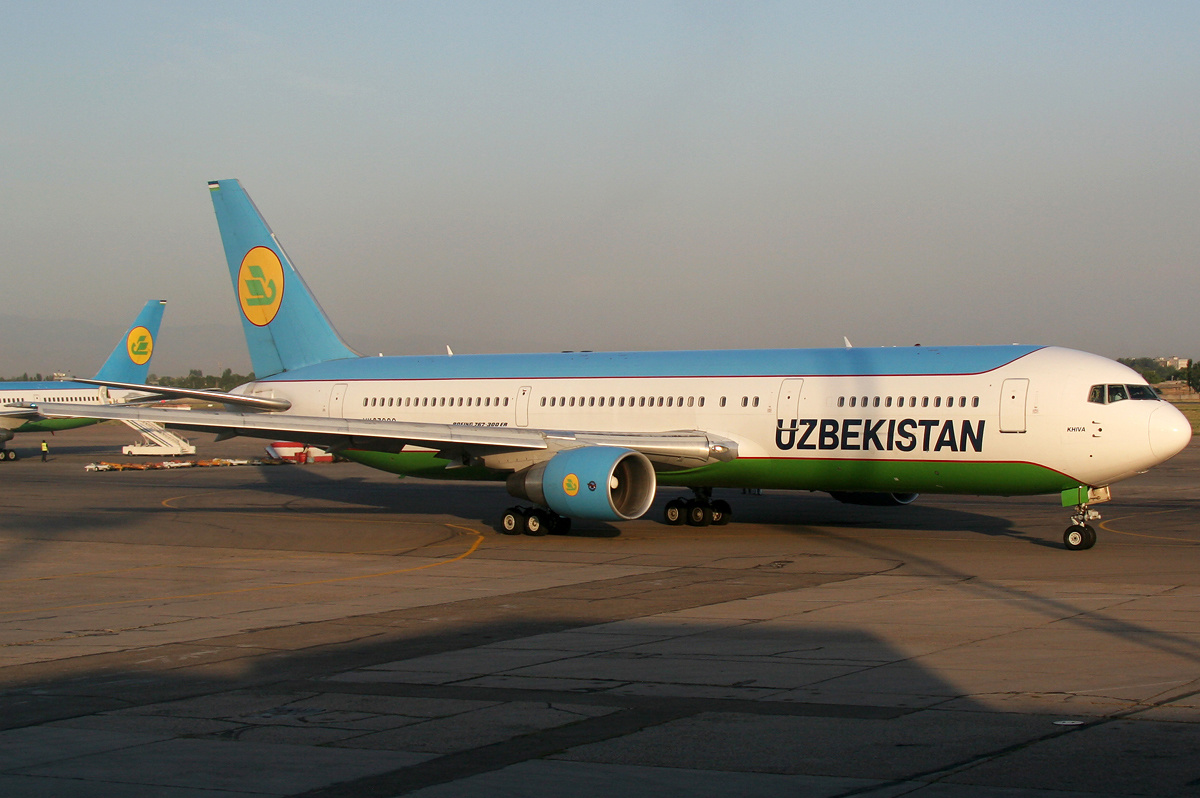
A Uzbekistan Airways Boeing 767-300ER at Tashkent International Airport, the airline's hub

| Country | City | Airport | Notes | Ref(s) |
|---|---|---|---|---|
| Azerbaijan | Baku | Heydar Aliyev International Airport | Passenger | |
| Bahrain | Manama | Bahrain International Airport | Terminated | |
| Bangladesh | Dhaka | Hazrat Shahjalal International Airport | Terminated | |
| Belarus | Minsk | Minsk National Airport | Passenger | |
| Bulgaria | Burgas | Burgas Airport | Seasonal Charter | |
| China | Beijing | Beijing Capital International Airport | Passenger | |
| China | Guangzhou | Guangzhou Baiyun International Airport | Passenger | |
| China | Hangzhou | Hangzhou Xiaoshan International Airport | Passenger | |
| China | Sanya | Sanya Phoenix International Airport | Passenger | |
| China | Shanghai | Shanghai Pudong International Airport | Cargo | |
| China | Tianjin | Tianjin Binhai International Airport | Cargo | |
| China | Ürümqi | Ürümqi Tianshan International Airport | Passenger | |
| Czech Republic | Karlovy Vary | Karlovy Vary Airport | Seasonal charter | |
| Egypt | Cairo | Cairo International Airport | Terminated | |
| Egypt | Hurghada | Hurghada International Airport | Passenger | |
| France | Paris | Charles de Gaulle Airport | Passenger | |
| Georgia | Tbilisi | Shota Rustaveli Tbilisi International Airport | Passenger | |
| Germany | Frankfurt | Frankfurt Airport | Passenger | |
| Germany | Munich | Munich Airport | Passenger | |
| Greece | Athens | Athens International Airport | Terminated | |
| India | Amritsar | Sri Guru Ram Das Ji International Airport | Terminated | |
| India | Delhi | Indira Gandhi International Airport | Passenger | |
| India | Goa | Manohar International Airport | Passenger | |
| India | Mumbai | Chhatrapati Shivaji Maharaj International Airport | Passenger | |
| Indonesia | Jakarta | Soekarno–Hatta International Airport | Terminated | |
| Iran | Tehran | Imam Khomeini International Airport | Terminated | |
| Israel | Tel Aviv | Ben Gurion Airport | Passenger | |
| Italy | Milan | Milan Malpensa Airport | Passenger | |
| Italy | Rome | Rome Fiumicino Airport | Passenger | |
| Japan | Osaka | Kansai International Airport | Terminated | |
| Japan | Tokyo | Narita International Airport | Passenger | |
| Kazakhstan | Almaty | Almaty International Airport | Passenger | |
| Kazakhstan | Astana | Nursultan Nazarbayev International Airport | Passenger | |
| Kazakhstan | Atyrau | Atyrau Airport | Begins 29 March 2026 | |
| Kyrgyzstan | Bishkek | Manas International Airport | Passenger | |
| Kyrgyzstan | Issyk-Kul | Issyk-Kul International Airport | Seasonal Charter | |
| Latvia | Riga | Riga International Airport | Passenger | |
| Malaysia | Kuala Lumpur | Kuala Lumpur International Airport | Passenger | |
| Maldives | Malé | Velana International Airport | Seasonal Charter | |
| Netherlands | Amsterdam | Amsterdam Airport Schiphol | Terminated | |
| Pakistan | Islamabad | Benazir Bhutto International Airport | Airport Closed | |
| Pakistan | Islamabad | Islamabad International Airport | Passenger | |
| Pakistan | Karachi | Jinnah International Airport | Terminated | |
| Pakistan | Lahore | Allama Iqbal International Airport | Passenger | |
| Poland | Warsaw | Warsaw Chopin Airport | Begins 5 April 2027 | |
| Russia | Blagoveshchensk | Ignatyevo Airport | Passenger | |
| Russia | Chelyabinsk | Chelyabinsk Airport | Terminated | |
| Russia | Grozny | Kadyrov Grozny International Airport | Passenger | |
| Russia | Irkutsk | International Airport Irkutsk | Passenger | |
| Russia | Kaliningrad | Khrabrovo Airport | Passenger | |
| Russia | Kazan | Ğabdulla Tuqay Kazan International Airport | Passenger | |
| Russia | Khabarovsk | Khabarovsk Novy Airport | Passenger | |
| Russia | Krasnodar | Krasnodar International Airport | Passenger | |
| Russia | Krasnoyarsk | Krasnoyarsk International Airport | Passenger | |
| Russia | Makhachkala | Uytash Airport | Passenger | |
| Russia | Mineralnye Vody | Mineralnye Vody Airport | Passenger | |
| Russia | Moscow | Moscow Domodedovo Airport | Passenger | |
| Russia | Moscow | Vnukovo International Airport | Passenger | |
| Russia | Nizhnevartovsk | Nizhnevartovsk Airport | Passenger | |
| Russia | Nizhny Novgorod | Strigino International Airport | Passenger | |
| Russia | Novosibirsk | Tolmachevo Airport | Passenger | |
| Russia | Omsk | Omsk Tsentralny Airport | Terminated | |
| Russia | Rostov-on-Don | Platov International Airport | Terminated | |
| Russia | Rostov-on-Don | Rostov-on-Don Airport | Airport Closed | |
| Russia | Samara | Kurumoch International Airport | Passenger | |
| Russia | Sochi | Adler-Sochi International Airport | Passenger | |
| Russia | Saint Petersburg | Pulkovo Airport | Passenger | |
| Russia | Tyumen | Roshchino International Airport | Terminated | |
| Russia | Ufa | Mustai Karim Ufa International Airport | Passenger | |
| Russia | Vladivostok | Vladivostok International Airport | Passenger | |
| Russia | Volgograd | Volgograd International Airport | Terminated | |
| Russia | Yekaterinburg | Koltsovo International Airport | Passenger | |
| Saudi Arabia | Jeddah | King Abdulaziz International Airport | Passenger | |
| Saudi Arabia | Riyadh | King Khalid International Airport | Terminated | |
| Singapore | Singapore | Changi Airport | Terminated | |
| South Korea | Busan | Gimhae International Airport | Terminated | |
| South Korea | Seoul | Incheon International Airport | Passenger | |
| Spain | Madrid | Madrid–Barajas Airport | Passenger | |
| Switzerland | Geneva | Geneva Airport | Terminated | |
| Tajikistan | Dushanbe | Dushanbe International Airport | Passenger | |
| Thailand | Bangkok | Suvarnabhumi Airport | Passenger | |
| Thailand | Phuket | Phuket International Airport | Passenger | |
| Turkey | Istanbul | Atatürk Airport | Airport closed | |
| Turkey | Istanbul | Istanbul Airport | Passenger | |
| Turkey | Istanbul | Istanbul Sabiha Gökçen International Airport | Passenger | |
| Turkmenistan | Aşgabat | Aşgabat International Airport | Terminated | |
| Ukraine | Kyiv | Boryspil International Airport | Terminated | |
| Ukraine | Kyiv | Igor Sikorsky Kyiv International Airport (Zhuliany) | Terminated | |
| Ukraine | Simferopol | Simferopol International Airport | Terminated | |
| United Arab Emirates | Dubai | Dubai International Airport | Passenger | |
| United Arab Emirates | Sharjah | Sharjah International Airport | Passenger | |
| United Kingdom | Birmingham | Birmingham Airport | Terminated | |
| United Kingdom | London | Gatwick Airport | Passenger | |
| United Kingdom | London | Heathrow Airport | Passenger | |
| United Kingdom | Manchester | Manchester Airport | Terminated | |
| United States | New York City | John F. Kennedy International Airport | Passenger | |
| Uzbekistan | Andijan | Andizhan Airport | Passenger | |
| Uzbekistan | Bukhara | Bukhara International Airport | Passenger | |
| Uzbekistan | Fergana | Fergana International Airport | Passenger | |
| Uzbekistan | Namangan | Namangan Airport | Passenger | |
| Uzbekistan | Navoi | Navoi International Airport | Passenger | |
| Uzbekistan | Nukus | Nukus Airport | Passenger | |
| Uzbekistan | Qarshi | Qarshi Airport | Passenger | |
| Uzbekistan | Samarqand | Samarqand International Airport | Passenger | |
| Uzbekistan | Tashkent | Tashkent International Airport | Hub | |
| Uzbekistan | Termez | Termez Airport | Passenger | |
| Uzbekistan | Urgench | Urgench International Airport | Passenger | |
| Uzbekistan | Zaamin | Zaamin Airport | Passenger | |
| Uzbekistan | Zarafshan | Zarafshan Airport | Terminated | |
| Vietnam | Hanoi | Noi Bai International Airport | Terminated | |
| Vietnam | Ho Chi Minh City | Tan Son Nhat International Airport | Terminated | |
| Vietnam | Nha Trang | Cam Ranh International Airport | Passenger | |
| Vietnam | Phu Quoc | Phu Quoc International Airport | Passenger | |

== See also ==
- Transport in Uzbekistan
