= List of airports in Uzbekistan =

Map of Uzbekistan Regions

This is a list of airports in Uzbekistan, sorted by location.

Uzbekistan, officially the Republic of Uzbekistan (Uzbek: O‘zbekiston Respublikasi, Ўзбекистон Республикаси) is a country in Central Asia; before 1991 it was part of the Soviet Union. It shares borders with Kazakhstan to the west and to the north, Kyrgyzstan and Tajikistan to the east, and Afghanistan and Turkmenistan to the south.

Uzbekistan is divided into 12 regions, one autonomous republic, and one independent city. The provinces in turn are divided into 160 districts.

== Airports ==
Airport names shown in bold have scheduled passenger service on commercial airlines.

Location served	ICAO	IATA	Airport name	Usage	Coordinates
Andijan Region
Andijan	UZFA	AZN	**Andizhan Airport**	Public	40°43′40″N 072°17′38″E
Marhamat	UZ-0028		Kuva Southeast Airport	Private	40°29′00″N 072°16′54″E
Bukhara Region
Bukhara	UZSB	BHK	**Bukhara International Airport**	Public	39°46′30″N 064°29′00″E
Kagan	UT1P		Kagan South Air Base	Military	39°41′17″N 064°32′41″E
Fergana Region
Fergana	UZFF	FEG	**Fergana International Airport**	Public	40°21′32″N 071°44′42″E
Kokand	UZFK	OQN	**Kokand Airport**	Public	40°26′58″N 070°59′49″E
Sokh	UZSO		**Sokh airport**	Public	39°58′08″N 071°07′31″E
Ramadan	UZ-0029		Kuva West Airport	Private	40°30′17″N 071°54′08″E
Jizzakh Region
Arnasoy	TBD	TBD	Arnasoy Airport	Public	40°35′30″N 067°37′35″E
Paxtakor	UT1Q		Pakhtakor Air Base	Military	40°15′10″N 067°54′38″E
Zomin	UZTZ	OMN	**Zomin Airport**	Public	39°58′11″N 068°32′35″E
Karakalpakstan Republic
Jasliq	UZ-0003		Jasliq Air Base	Military	44°1′48″N 057°31′45″E
Kungrad	UT77		Kungrad Airport	Private	43°04′59″N 058°53′3″E
Moynaq	UZNM	MOK	**Muynak Airport**	Public	43°45′19″N 059°01′51″E
Nukus	UZNN	NCU	**Nukus Airport**	Public	42°29′18″N 059°37′23″E
Kantubek	UZ-0037		Barkhan Airfield	Military	45°09′33″N 059°18′07″E
Khorezm Region
Urgench	UZNU	UGC	**Urgench International Airport**	Public	41°35′03″N 060°38′30″E
Namangan Region
Kara-Kalpak	UZ-0022		Kara-Kalpak Airfield	Private	40°48′12″N 071°11′21″E
Namangan	UZFN	NMA	**Namangan Airport**	Public	40°59′04″N 071°33′24″E
Navoiy Region
Navoiy	UZSA	NVI	**Navoiy International Airport**	Public	40°07′04″N 065°10′30″E
Tamdybulak	UZSM		Tandy Bulak Airport	Private	41°45′44″N 064°36′01″E
Uchkuduk	UZSU		Uchkuduk Airport	Private	42°04′59″N 063°26′57″E
Zarafshan	UZSN	AFS	**Zarafshan Airport**	Public	41°36′49″N 064°13′58″E
Qashqadaryo Region
Maymanak	UT73		Maymanak Airport	Private	39°08′16″N 065°09′55″E
Qarshi	UZSK	KSQ	**Karshi Airport**	Public	38°48′14″N 065°46′14″E
Qarshi	UZSL		Karshi-Khanabad	Military	38°50′01″N 065°55′17″E
Shakhrisabz	UZSH	RZB	**Shakhrisabz Airport**	Public	39°01′48″N 066°46′32″E
Samarkand Region
Samarkand	UZSS	SKD	**Samarkand International Airport**	Public	39°42′02″N 066°59′02″E
Surxondaryo Region
Kakaydi	UT1M		Kakaydy Air Base	Military	37°37′30″N 067°31′2″E
Sariosiyo	UZSR	IYO	**Sariosiyo Airport**	Public	38°24′38″N 067°56′43″E
Termez	UZST	TMJ	**Termez Airport**	Public	37°17′12″N 067°18′36″E
Sirdaryo Region
Sirdaryo	UZ-0047		Sirdaryo Airfield	Private	40°48′27″N 068°41′11″E
Tashkent City
Tashkent	UZTT	TAS	**Tashkent International Airport**	Public	41°15′28″N 069°16′52″E
Tashkent	UZTP	TVT	Tashkent-Humo Airport	Private	41°18′37″N 069°23′33″E
Tashkent Region
Chirchik	UZTC		Chirchik Air Base	Military	41°30′39″N 069°34′33″E

== See also ==
- Transport in Uzbekistan
- List of airports by ICAO code: U#UT - Tajikistan, Turkmenistan, Uzbekistan
- Wikipedia: WikiProject Aviation/Airline destination lists: Asia#Uzbekistan
