= Fergana International Airport =

Fergana International Airport Farg'ona xalqaro aeroporti (Uzbek)
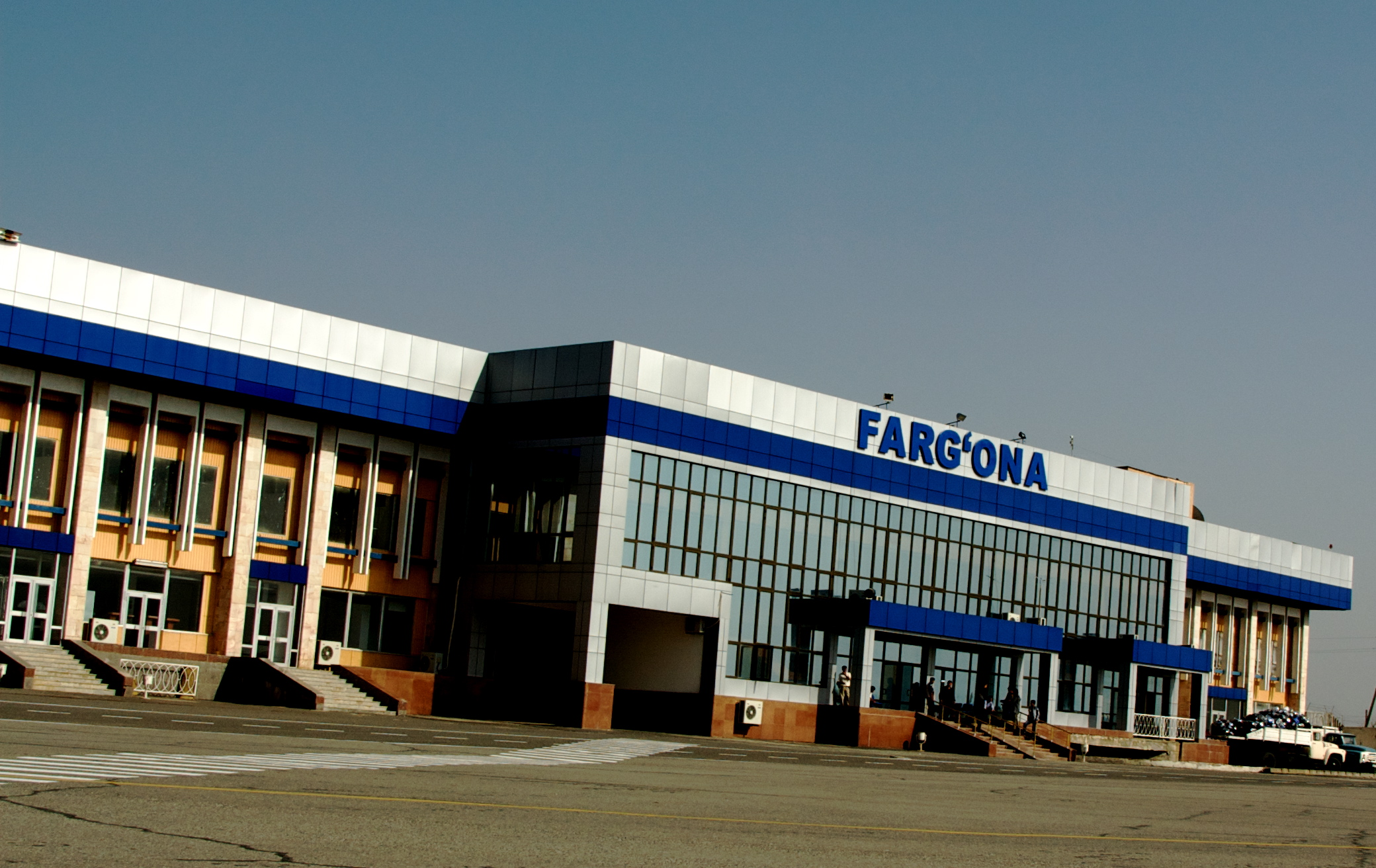
- Fergana Airport, Uzbekistan
- IATA: FEG; ICAO: UZFF

Summary
- Airport type: Public
- Owner: Government of Uzbekistan
- Operator: International Airport Fergana LLC
- Serves: Fergana
- Location: Fergana, Uzbekistan
- Elevation AMSL: 625 m (2,051 ft)
- Coordinates: 40°21′32″N 071°44′42″E
- Website: http://ferganaairport.uz/

Map
- Location of air base in Uzbekistan

Runways
Direction	Length		Surface
Direction	m	ft	Surface
18/36	2,862	9,390	Asphalt
- Sources: Airport diagram DAFIF

Fergana International Airport (IATA: FEG, ICAO: UZFF (old UTFF)) is a small airport serving the city of Fergana, the capital city of Fergana Region in Uzbekistan. It is one of the biggest airports in Uzbekistan after Tashkent International Airport, Samarkand International Airport and Namangan International Airport

From 1960 the 194th Guards Military-Transport Aviation Regiment of Military Transport Aviation was based at the airport, arriving from Sredne-Belaya in the Far East. In early 1992 the unit came under Uzbek / Uzbek Air Force control.

== Facilities ==
The airport is at an elevation of 625 metres (2,051 ft) above mean sea level. It has one runway designated 18/36 with an asphalt surface measuring 2,860 by 50 metres (9,383 ft × 164 ft).

The airport is capable of handling aircraft such as the Ilyushin Il-76, Antonov An-124, Tupolev Tu-134, Airbus (A310, A320, A330), and Boeing (737, 757, 767), as well as other Class 3 and Class 4 aircraft and all types of helicopters.

== Airlines and destinations ==
Airlines	Destinations
Centrum Air	Tashkent, Istanbul
Nordwind Airlines	Kazan (begins 25 November 2026)
Qanot Sharq	Moscow–Domodedovo
S7 Airlines	Irkutsk, Novosibirsk
Silk Avia	Urgench, Bukhara, Navoi, Samarqand, Tashkent
Turkish Airlines	Istanbul (suspended)
Ural Airlines	Moscow–Domodedovo, Moscow–Zhukovsky
Utair	Moscow–Vnukovo, Surgut
Uzbekistan Airways	Istanbul, Kazan, Moscow–Vnukovo, Novosibirsk, Saint Petersburg, Tashkent
Nordwind Airlines	Kazan (begins 25 November 2026)

== See also ==
- List of the busiest airports in the former USSR
- Transportation in Uzbekistan
