= Muynak Airport =

Airport in Muynak, Uzbekistan

Muynak Airport Moynaq aeroportı Moʻynoq aeroporti
- IATA: MOK; ICAO: UZNM

Summary
- Serves: Moʻynoq
- Location: Karakalpakstan, Uzbekistan
- Opened: 1947
- Elevation AMSL: 177 ft (54 m)
- Coordinates: 43°45′18″N 59°1′51″E

Map
- Location of airport in Uzbekistan

Runways
Direction	Length		Surface
Direction	m	ft	Surface
04/22	1,513	4,964

Muynak Airport (Karakalpak: Moynaq aeroportı; Uzbek: Moʻynoq aeroporti) (IATA: MOK, ICAO: UZNM) is an airport located in the city of Moynak, Karakalpakstan, Uzbekistan. It is considered as small type airport in terms of its capacity to transport passengers.

== History ==
In 1947, Muynak Airport was built, and was classified as a 3rd class airport. It was capable of handling An-24, Yak-40 and additional light aircraft, as well as helicopters and so on. From the 1960s until the early 1990s, an An-2 aircraft link was based at the aerodrome; up to 19 passenger flights per day were made on local air lines (in particular, to Kungrad, Nukus, Urgench, Takhtakupyr, Kazakhdarya, Aspantay, Tuley) points. Since the 1990s, it has been used as a landing platform for aerial work (in particular, for agrochemical measures to combat locust foci in the southern Aral Sea region).

=== Present ===
In 2019, the reconstruction of Muynak Airport began under a government program aimed at improving the social-economic development of the region. The total cost of the project amounted to 300 billion soums, one third of which was allocated to the construction of a new 2.3 km long runway. In August 2020, the reconstruction was completed, with the first aircraft to land being an Airbus A320.

== Airlines and destinations ==
Airlines	Destinations
Silk Avia	Nukus
Uzbekistan Airways	Nukus

== See also ==
- Tashkent International Airport
- Termez Airport
- Bukhara International Airport
