= Silk Avia =

Uzbekistan airline

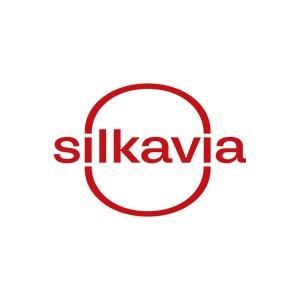
IATA	ICAO	Call sign
US	USA	SILK
- Founded: July 6, 2021
- Commenced operations: April 25, 2023
- Hubs: Tashkent International Airport
- Fleet size: 8
- Destinations: 15
- Parent company: Uzbekistan Helicopters
- Headquarters: Tashkent, Uzbekistan
- Key people: Sardor Irmukhamedov (Chairman)
- Website: Official website

Silk Avia LCC, better known as Silk Avia or Silkavia, is a regional airline based in Uzbekistan with its hub at Tashkent International Airport. The airline was established as a low-cost carrier and is a partner of Uzbekistan Airways. Silk Avia is owned by Uzbekistan Helicopters. Currently, Silk Avia operates flights to 15 destinations, with plans to expand its network to 40 destinations. Silk Avia has adopted the IATA and ICAO codes of "US" and "USA".

== History ==
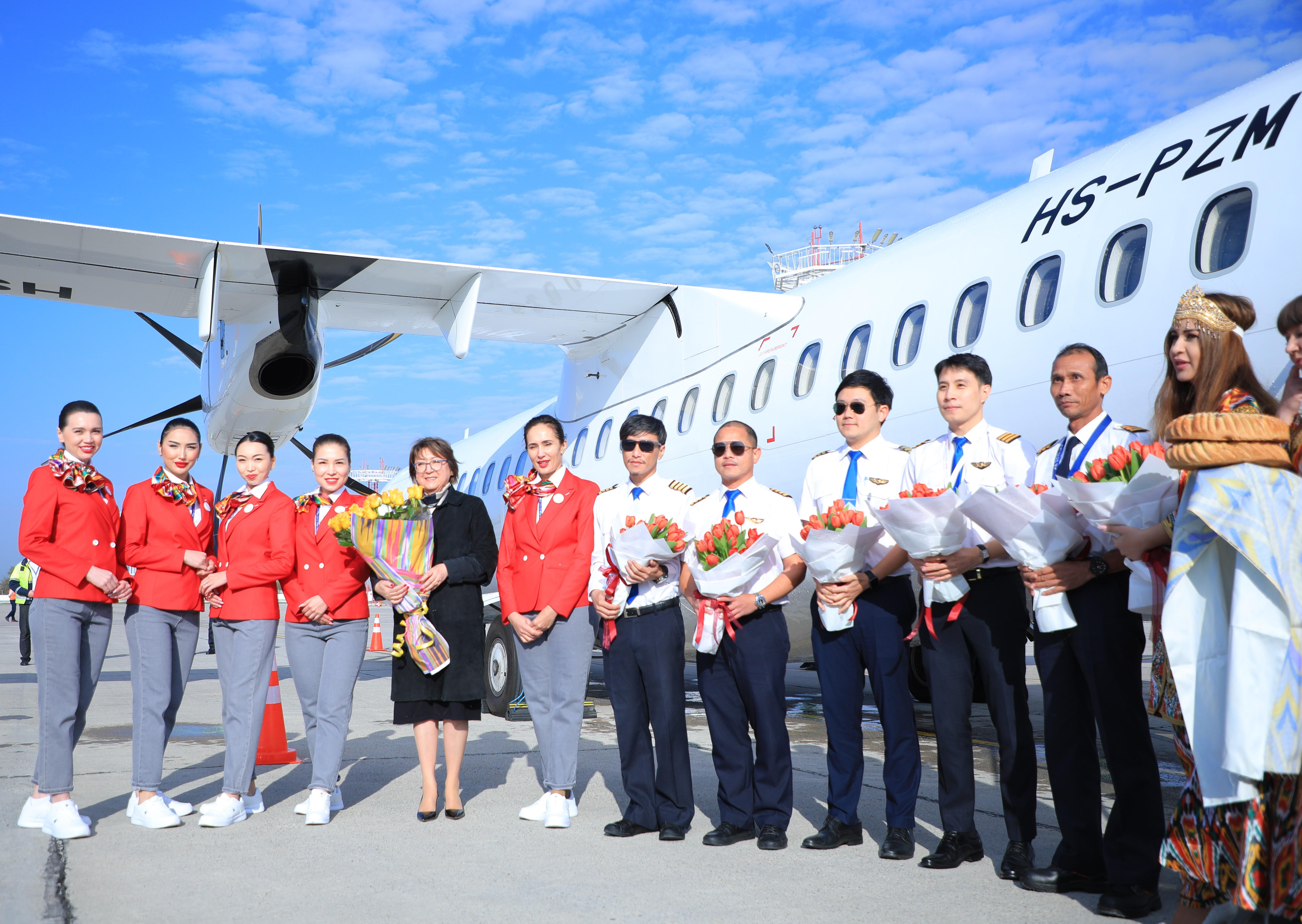
Ceremonial welcome of the first Silk Avia aircraft along with its crew

Silk Avia was founded on July 6, 2021, under the initiative of Uzbekistan's Ministry of Transport. The goal was to promote domestic tourism and business activities. The airline's establishment was officially announced in November 2021 at the Dubai Airshow. Silk Avia became the first operator of ATR 72 aircraft in Central Asia. Initially, the airline began operations with three aircraft previously operated by Bangkok Airways. On March 18, 2023, its first aircraft departed from Bangkok and arrived in Tashkent on March 21, 2023, after six stopovers. Following test flights, commercial operations began on April 25, 2023.

On November 23, 2022, the airline placed an order for five new ATR aircraft with Avions de Transport Régional GIE. Three aircraft were sourced directly from the manufacturer and two through a leasing agreement with Nordic Aviation Capital. The lease arrangement was announced at the Paris Air Show on June 20, 2023. The first aircraft under this lease agreement was delivered in February 2024.

In August 2024, the airline operated its first international flight to the Issyk-Kul region of Kyrgyzstan. In the same month, regular flights from Samarkand to the city of Turkestan in Kazakhstan are planned to begin.

=== Structural changes ===
In October 2023, in accordance with the decision of the President of the Republic of Uzbekistan regarding additional measures to organize aviation activities effectively, a number of changes were made within the national airline "Uzbekistan Airways" (Uzbekistan Airways).

According to the decision:

- 100% of Silk Avia's capital was transferred to the charter capital of Uzbekistan Helicopters.
- Three ATR 72-600 aircraft purchased by "Uzbekistan Airports" were transferred to the possession of Uzbekistan Helicopters.
- Uzbekistan Helicopters was tasked with increasing its fleet of ATR 72-600 aircraft.

These changes were made with the goal of developing and improving the efficiency of Uzbekistan's aviation sector.

== Fleet ==
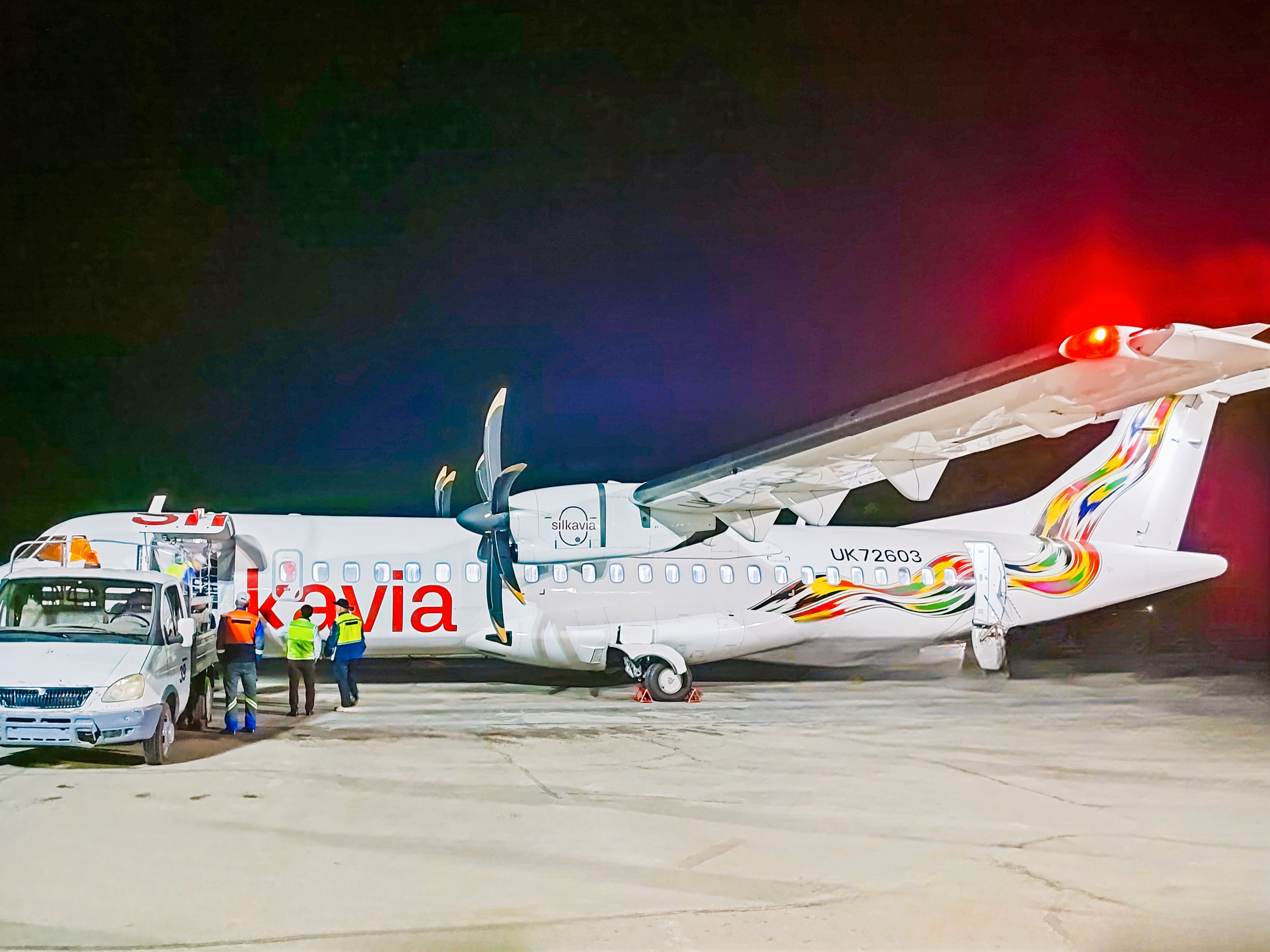
Silk Avia's ATR 72-600 aircraft is preparing for flight US-903 to Tashkent at Urgench International Airport

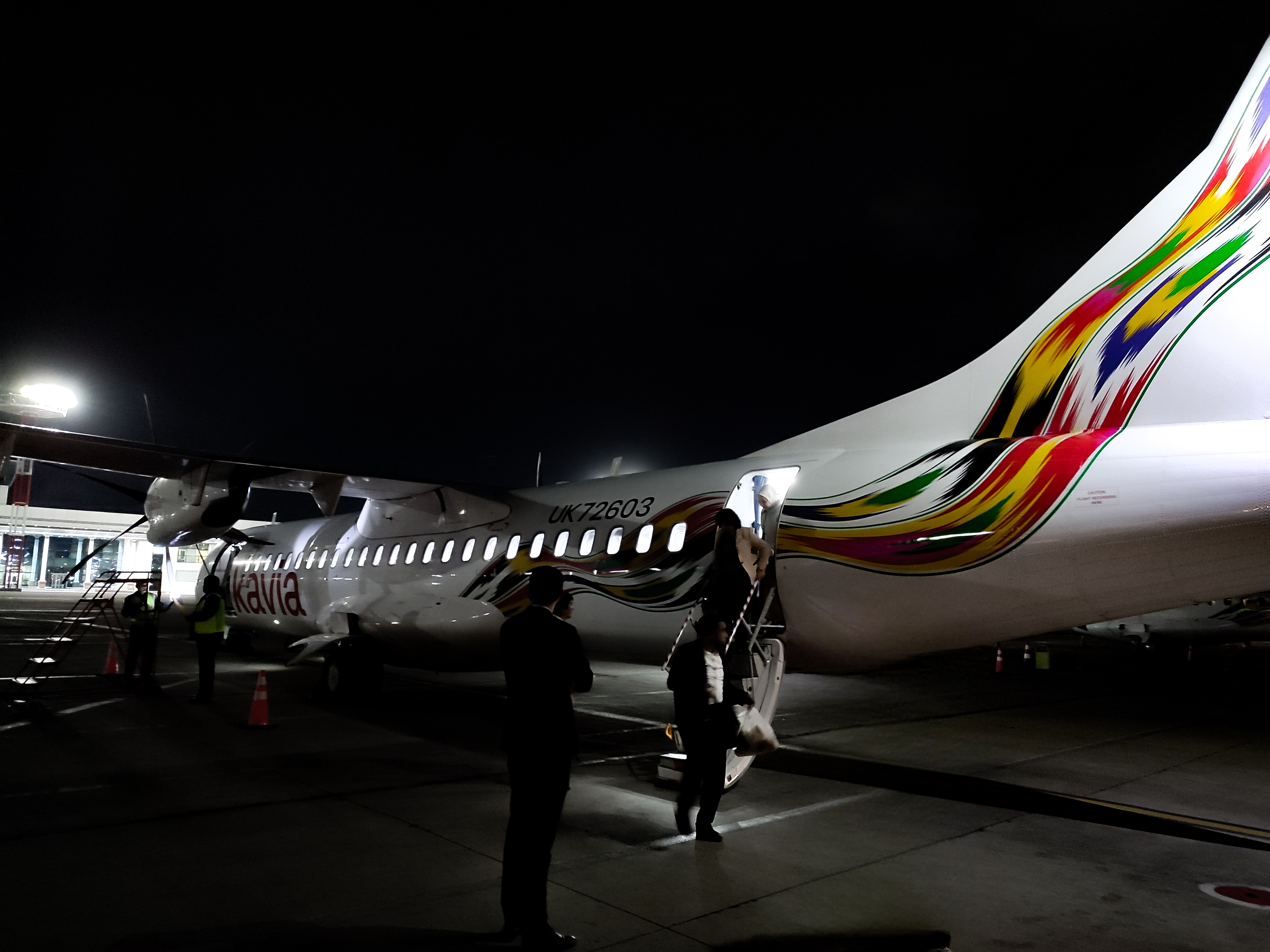
Passengers disembarking from Silk Avia's ATR 72-600 aircraft at Tashkent International Airport

As of December 2024, the Silk Avia fleet consists of the following aircraft types:

- ATR 42-600: 2 on order.
- ATR 72-600: 5 in service, 3 on order. Three of these aircraft were acquired from Bangkok Airways.
- Let L-410 Turbolet: 4 in service. These are operated on behalf of Uzbekistan Airways.

In total, Silk Avia operates 9 aircraft and has 5 additional units on order.

=== Livery ===
The Silk Avia livery takes inspiration from its name, "silk." It features a satin fabric design that extends from the nose to the middle of the fuselage. The colors reflect traditional tones found in Central Asian satin fabric, notably seen in the patterns of a tubeteika (traditional cap). The airline plans to introduce multiple variations of the design in the future.

== Destinations ==
As of October 2024, Silk Avia operates flights to the following destinations:

Silk Avia Destinations
Country	City	Airport	Notes
Kazakhstan	Türkistan	Äziret Sūltan International Airport	
Kyrgyzstan	Tamchy	Issyk-Kul International Airport	Seasonal
Uzbekistan	Bukhara	Bukhara International Airport	
Uzbekistan	Fergana	Fergana International Airport	
Uzbekistan	Kokand	Kokand Airport	
Uzbekistan	Muynak	Muynak Airport	
Uzbekistan	Namangan	Namangan Airport	
Uzbekistan	Navoiy	Navoiy International Airport	
Uzbekistan	Nukus	Nukus Airport	
Uzbekistan	Qarshi	Qarshi Airport	
Uzbekistan	Samarqand	Samarqand International Airport	Focus city
Uzbekistan	Sariasia	Sariasia Airport	
Uzbekistan	Shahrisabz	Shahrisabz Airport	
Uzbekistan	Tashkent	Islam Karimov Tashkent International Airport	Hub
Uzbekistan	Termez	Termez Airport	
Uzbekistan	Urgench	Urgench International Airport	
Uzbekistan	Zomin	Zomin Airport	

== See also ==
- List of airlines of Uzbekistan
- Transport in Uzbekistan
