= Zomin Airport =

Airport in Uzbekistan

Zomin Airport Zomin aeroporti
- IATA: OMN; ICAO: UZTZ

Summary
- Airport type: Public
- Owner: Government of Uzbekistan
- Operator: Uzbekistan Airways
- Serves: Zomin
- Location: Zomin, Zomin District, Jizzakh Region, Uzbekistan
- Opened: 2023
- Time zone: UZB (UTC+05:00)
- Elevation AMSL: 1,760 ft / 536 m
- Coordinates: 40°00′54.459″N 68°24′35.127″E
- Interactive map of Zomin Airport

Runways
Direction	Length		Surface
Direction	m	ft	Surface
07/25	1,200	3,937	Asphalt

Zomin Airport or Zaamin Airport (IATA: OMN, ICAO: UZTZ) is a regional airport located in the Zomin District of Jizzakh Region, Uzbekistan. The airport serves as an important transportation hub for both passengers and freight within the southeastern part of Uzbekistan.

== Development ==
Uzbekistan Airways began construction of the facility in the city of Zamin, Jizzakh Region, on July 27, 2023, and successfully completed the major construction works by September 1, 2023. The airport was constructed by the Tres 001 construction organization. The airport covers an area of 60 hectares. The terminal is designed to accommodate 30 passengers. The ceremony was officially opened by Ergash Saliyev, the Governor of Jizzakh Region.

On September 1, 2023, Uzbekistan Airways announced the launch of air services to the city of Zamin in the Jizzakh Region. On September 1, it welcomed the arrival of LET L-410 and Pilatus PC-24 aircraft. On September 7, Uzbekistan Airways launched daily flights between Samarkand, Tashkent and Zamin.

In June 2024, reconstruction work was carried out at the airport, including the paving of the runway, taxiways, and apron.

On June 22, 2024, Uzbekistan Airways performed its first technical flight from Tashkent to Zomin on an Airbus A320neo. To accommodate this flight, the runway was reconstructed. On June 24, the regional airline Silk Avia announced the relaunch of flights between Tashkent and Zamin. On June 26, an Uzbekistan Airways Airbus A320 landed at Zamin Airport, marking its first international flight from Urumqi.

== Specification ==
The airport complex is equipped with a 1,200-meter asphalt runway, a parking area for two aircraft, a control tower, and a passenger terminal that houses ground services. The spacious hall allows passengers to comfortably wait for their flights. A parking zone for cars is also provided, and there are plans for the construction of a helicopter landing pad in the future.

== Airlines and destinations ==
Zamin Airport currently operates domestic flights to Tashkent and Samarkand. The primary destinations served include:

Airlines	Destinations
Silk Avia	Tashkent
Uzbekistan Airways	Samarqand, Tashkent

== See also ==
- Transportation in Uzbekistan
- List of airports in Uzbekistan
- Jizzakh Region
