= Nukus Airport =

Airport in Nukus, Karakalpakstan, Uzbekistan

Nukus Airport Nókis xalıqaralıq aeroportı (Karakalpak)
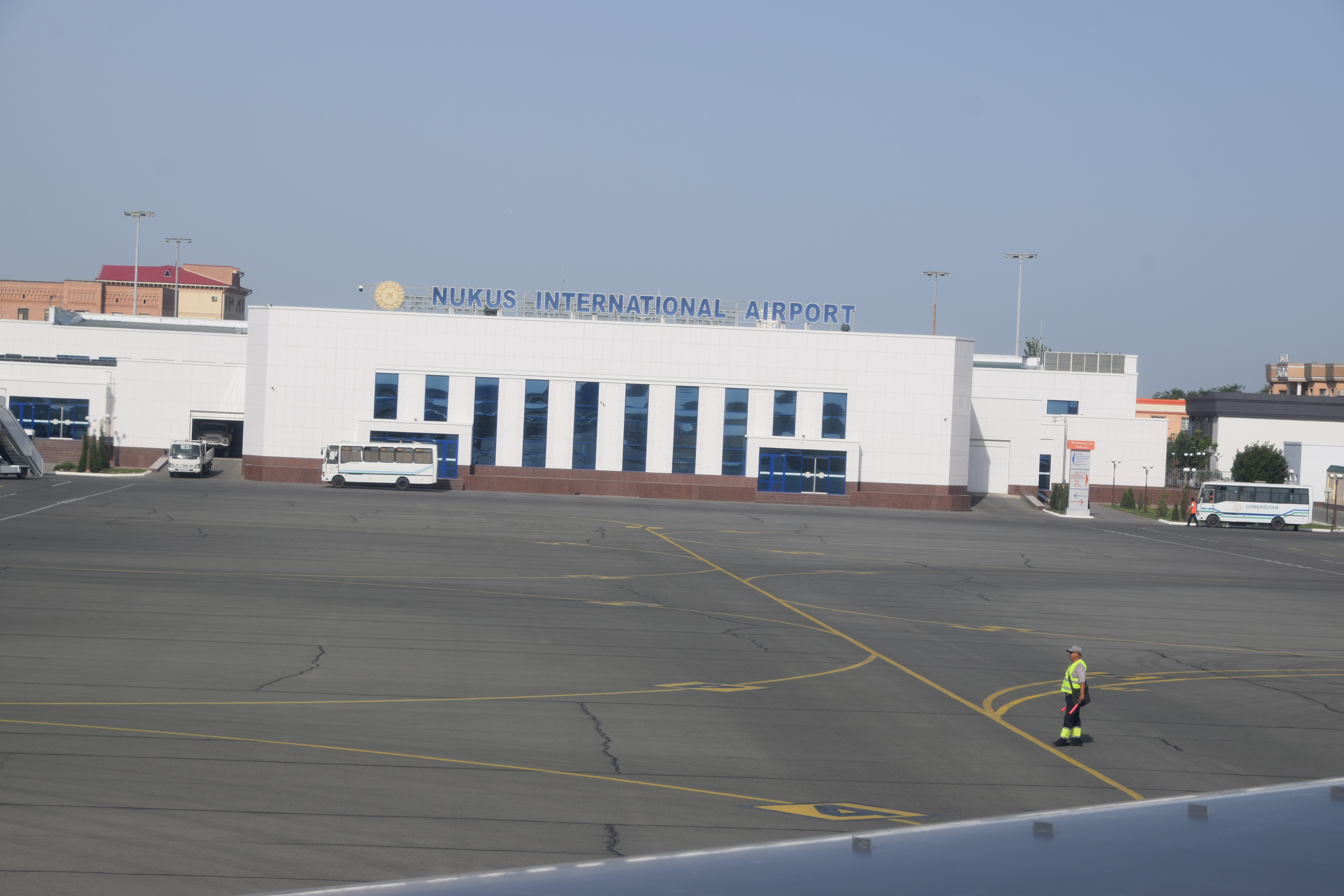
- IATA: NCU; ICAO: UZNN

Summary
- Airport type: Public
- Owner: Government of Uzbekistan
- Operator: Uzbekistan Airways
- Serves: Nukus, Karakalpakstan, Uzbekistan
- Elevation AMSL: 76 m (249 ft)
- Coordinates: 42°29′18″N 59°37′24″E
- Website: https://www.uzairways.com/en/flights/international-airport-nukus

Map
- Location of airport in Uzbekistan

Runways
Direction	Length		Surface
Direction	m	ft	Surface
15/33	3,000	9,843	Concrete
07/25	600	1,969	Concrete

Nukus Airport (Karakalpak: Nókis xalıqaralıq aeroportı / Нөкис халықаралық аэропорты; Uzbek: Nukus xalqaro aeroporti / Нукус халқаро аэропорти) (IATA: NCU, ICAO: UZNN) is an airport serving Nukus, the capital city of Karakalpakstan, an autonomous republic within Uzbekistan. The airport services more than twenty passenger flights to other cities in Uzbekistan and CIS weekly.

During the Soviet period, it was home to a separate aviation test squadron supporting chemical weapons development, which flew flights to Zhaslyk airfield adjoining the Zhaslyk chemical weapons site.

== Facilities ==
The airport resides at an elevation of 76 metres (249 ft) above mean sea level. It has two runways, 15/33 measuring 3,000 by 48 metres (9,843 ft × 157 ft) and 07/25 measuring 600 by 25 metres (1,969 ft × 82 ft).

== Airlines and destinations ==
Airlines	Destinations
Centrum Air	Almaty, Aqtau, Atyrau, Tashkent
FlyArystan	Almaty
Pobeda	Moscow–Vnukovo
SCAT Airlines	Aqtau
Silk Avia	Tashkent
Uzbekistan Airways	Almaty, Aqtau, Atyrau (begins 22 November 2026), Istanbul, Moscow–Vnukovo, Muynak, Tashkent

== See also ==
- Transportation in Uzbekistan
