= Qarshi Airport =

Qarshi Airport Qarshi Aeroporti
- IATA: KSQ; ICAO: UTSK

Summary
- Airport type: Civil
- Owner: Government of Uzbekistan
- Operator: Uzbekistan Airways
- Serves: Qarshi
- Location: Qarshi, Uzbekistan
- Elevation AMSL: 1,230 ft (370 m)
- Coordinates: 38°48′14″N 065°46′21″E
- Website: https://www.uzairways.com/en/flights/international-airport-karshi

Map
- Location of air base in Uzbekistan

Runways
Direction	Length		Surface
Direction	m	ft	Surface
16/34	2,700	8,860	Concrete
- SkyVector

Qarshi Airport (IATA: KSQ, ICAO: UTSK) is an airport in south eastern Uzbekistan, south-west of Qarshi.

== Airlines and destinations ==
Airlines	Destinations
Qanot Sharq	Istanbul
Silk Avia	Tashkent
Ural Airlines	Moscow–Domodedovo, Moscow–Zhukovsky
Uzbekistan Airways	Moscow–Vnukovo, Saint Petersburg

== See also ==
- Karshi-Khanabad Air Base
- List of the busiest airports in the former USSR
- Transportation in Uzbekistan
