= Zarafshan Airport =

Zarafshan Airport Zarafshon Aeroporti
- IATA: AFS; ICAO: UZSN

Summary
- Airport type: Public
- Owner: Government of Uzbekistan
- Operator: Uzbekistan Airways
- Serves: Zarafshon
- Location: Tomdi District, Uzbekistan
- Coordinates: 41°36′49″N 064°13′58″E

Map
- Location of airport in Uzbekistan

Runways
Direction	Length		Surface
Direction	m	ft	Surface
18/36	1,820	5,971	Concrete

Zarafshan Airport (IATA: AFS, ICAO: UZSN) is an airport of entry in Zarafshon, Navoiy Region, Uzbekistan.

== Facilities ==
The airport has one concrete runway which is 1,820 metres (5,971 ft) in length.

== See also ==
- List of the busiest airports in the former USSR
- Transport in Uzbekistan
