= Urgench International Airport =

Urgench International Airport Urganch Xalqaro Aeroporti
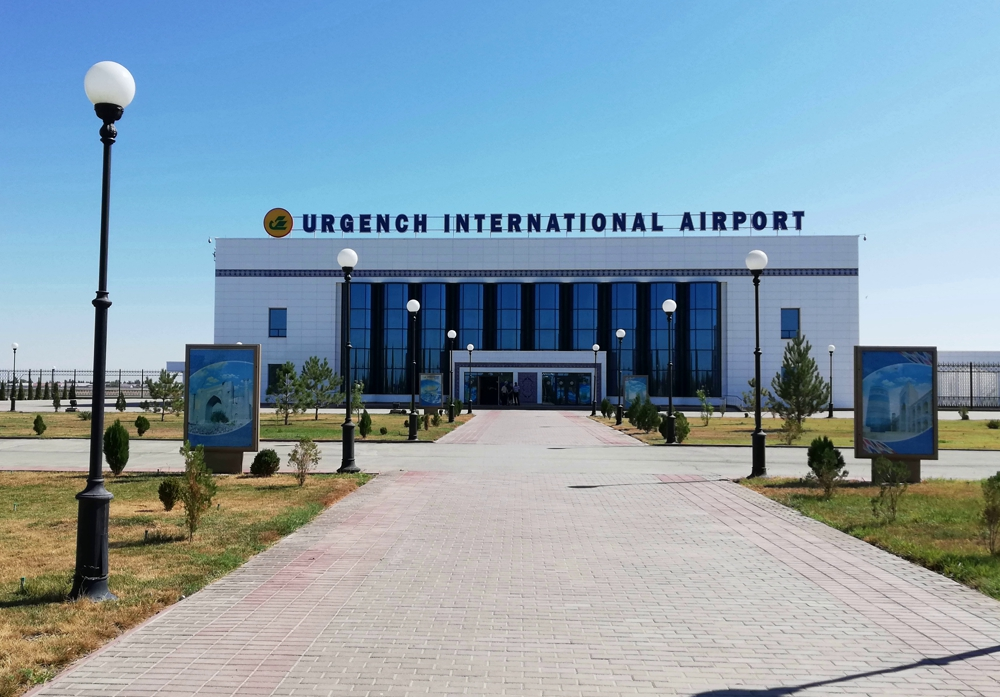
- IATA: UGC; ICAO: UZNU

Summary
- Airport type: Public
- Owner: Government of Uzbekistan
- Operator: Uzbekistan Airways
- Serves: Urgench, Khiva
- Location: Urgench, Uzbekistan
- Elevation AMSL: 320 ft (98 m)
- Coordinates: 41°35′03″N 060°38′30″E
- Website: Airport page on Uzbekistan Airports website

Map
- Location of air base in Uzbekistan

Runways
Direction	Length		Surface
Direction	m	ft	Surface
13/31	3,373	11,065	Asphalt
- Source: DAFIF

Urgench International Airport (IATA: UGC, ICAO: UZNU) is an international airport in Urgench, Uzbekistan. The airport is located 3 km from the center of Urgench and 30 km from Khiva.

== Facilities ==
Urgench International Airport was founded in 1932, and in 1975 its colonnaded terminal building was constructed.

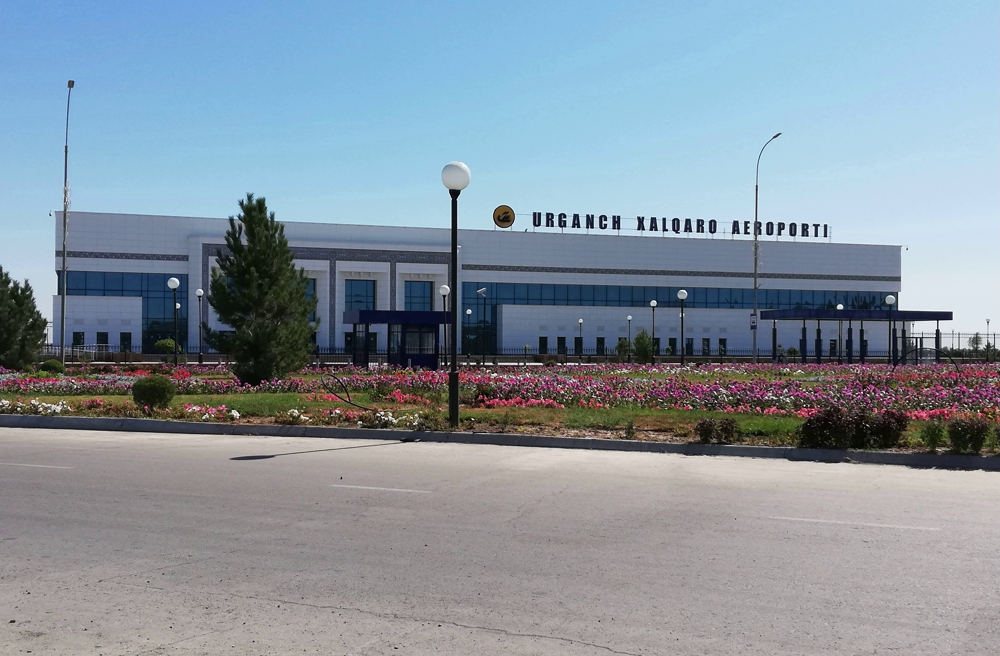
Domestic flight terminal

In 2006, a new terminal building was constructed with a capacity of 300 passengers per hour. The airport operates daily flights to Tashkent, along with regular services to Moscow, Saint Petersburg, and Mineralnye Vody. Charter flights to various domestic and international destinations are also operated on demand for travel agencies. In September 2008, a trial flight from Paris to Urgench was conducted using a Boeing 757.

In 2014, the airport underwent a major two-stage modernization of its passenger infrastructure as part of a regional program to boost tourism in the Khorezm Region. On May 22, 2014, a new arrival terminal was launched within the fully reconstructed 1975 building, designed by Uzshaharsozlik LITI and rebuilt by JSC 93-Mahsustrest. This was followed on December 15, 2014, by the opening of a separate departure terminal, with each facility capable of handling over 300 passengers per hour. The expanded complex features a 200-passenger transit lounge, dedicated VIP and CIP halls, a mother-and-child room, a medical station, duty-free shops, cafeterias, and a tourist information desk providing hotel and transport guidance. The forecourt was also redeveloped with parking areas for cars and tour buses to support growing passenger volume, which reached 143,370 people in 2013, including nearly 46,000 foreign tourists.

== Runway and airfield ==
The airport's single runway has a PCN of 59/F/B/X/T, accommodating aircraft up to a maximum takeoff weight of 310 tonnes. It is equipped to handle aircraft such as the An-12, An-24, An-26, An-28, An-32, An-72, An-74, An-124 (on request), Il-62, Il-76, Il-86, Il-96, L-410, Tu-134, Tu-154, Tu-204, Tu-214, Yak-40, Yak-42, Airbus A310, Airbus A319, Airbus A320, Airbus A321, ATR 42, ATR 72, Boeing 737, Boeing 747, Boeing 757, Boeing 767, Bombardier CRJ 100/200, Embraer EMB 120 Brasilia, Sukhoi Superjet 100, and all types of helicopters.

In October 2026, a comprehensive airfield reconstruction project was initiated, including extending the runway from 3,000 meters to 3,300 meters and resurfacing it with concrete. The taxiway layout is being upgraded from a single taxiway to four, including a high-speed exit taxiway, while aircraft parking stands are being expanded from 6 to 18. These improvements will upgrade the airport's reference code from Class E to Class F, enabling it to accommodate large aircraft such as the Boeing 747-8 and Airbus A380. Additionally, the lighting system, originally installed in 1997 and operating well past its 10-year design life, is being replaced with modern ICAO-compliant equipment to upgrade the airfield's approach lighting standard from Category I to Category II. This upgrade will allow aircraft to land in visibility as low as 300 meters, down from the previous 750-meter threshold, addressing frequent winter fog conditions that historically disrupted flight operations

== Reconstruction and Expansion ==
In April 2025, South Korea's Incheon International Airport Corporation won an international tender for the comprehensive modernization and management of Urgench International Airport. The project is implemented as a public–private partnership (PPP) under a Build-Operate-Transfer (BOT) model covering a total period of 22 years, including a 3-year construction phase.

The project structure was finalized in December 2025 with the signing of the PPP agreement between Uzbekistan Airports, Urgench Airport, and the special purpose vehicle ICN-Urgench Airport Services. Total project investment is estimated at US$242 million, split between US$134 million from the private partner and US$108 million in state-funded infrastructure improvements.

- Passenger Terminal: Construction of a new 39,200 m² passenger terminal began in late 2026. Designed by Kirin Design and built by BoMi Engineering & Construction with Samsung providing technical supervision, the terminal is designed for a peak capacity of 1,000 passengers per hour (approx. 3 million annually).
- Temporary Facilities: Following the demolition of the original 1970s terminal building, a temporary arrival terminal was erected to maintain uninterrupted flight operations during construction.
- Airside and Auxiliary Infrastructure: The scope includes a new cargo terminal, catering facilities, and state-funded reconstruction of the runway, taxiways, and apron areas.

Construction is scheduled for completion by the end of 2028. Starting in 2029, Incheon International Airport Corporation will assume operational management of the passenger terminal for a 19-year concession period.

== Airlines and destinations ==
=== Passenger ===
Airlines	Destinations
Aeroflot	Moscow–Sheremetyevo
Azerbaijan Airlines	Baku
azimuth	Moscow-Vnukovo
Qanot Sharq	Milan–Bergamo
Centrum Air	Tashkent, Moscow–Domodedovo, Saint Petersburg, Samarqand
Fly Khiva	Medina, Tashkent
FlyArystan	Almaty
FlyOne	Jeddah
Red Wings Airlines	Makhachkala, Samara
S7 Airlines	Moscow–Domodedovo
SCAT Airlines	Türkistan
Silk Avia	Tashkent
Turkish Airlines	Istanbul
Ural Airlines	Moscow–Zhukovsky
Uzbekistan Airways	Bukhara, Frankfurt, Istanbul, Madrid, Milan–Malpensa, Moscow–Vnukovo, Rome–Fiumicino, Saint Petersburg, Tashkent

=== Cargo ===
Airlines	Destinations
My Freighter Airlines	Ürümqi

== Ground transportation ==
In September 2026, Uzbekistan Railways launched an electric train service directly connecting Urgench International Airport with the historic city of Khiva via Urgench railway station. Constructed at a cost of 225 billion UZS, the project marked the first instance in Uzbekistan of a direct railway line integrated with an airport. The 42-minute rail journey serves both domestic travelers and international tourists visiting Khiva's UNESCO World Heritage sites.

== See also ==
- List of the busiest airports in the former USSR
- Transportation in Uzbekistan
