= Namangan Airport =

International Airport Namangan Namangan Aeroporti
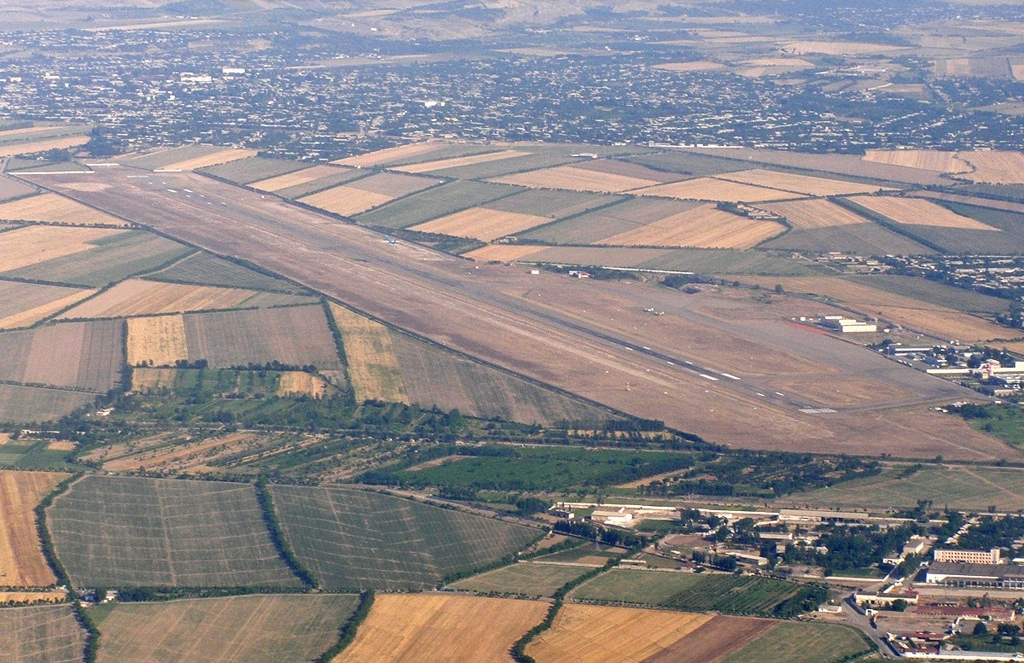
- IATA: NMA; ICAO: UZFN

Summary
- Airport type: Public
- Owner: Government of Uzbekistan
- Operator: Uzbekistan Airways
- Serves: Namangan
- Location: Namangan, Uzbekistan
- Elevation AMSL: 1,706 ft (520 m)
- Coordinates: 40°59′04″N 071°33′24″E
- Website: https://www.uzairways.com/en/flights/international-airport-namangan

Map
- Location of airport in Uzbekistan

Runways
Direction	Length		Surface
Direction	ft	m	Surface
10/28	10,698	3,261	Asphalt
- Source: World Aero Data

International Airport Namangan (IATA: NMA, ICAO: UZFN) is an airport in the western part of the city of Namangan in Uzbekistan.

== Airlines and destinations ==
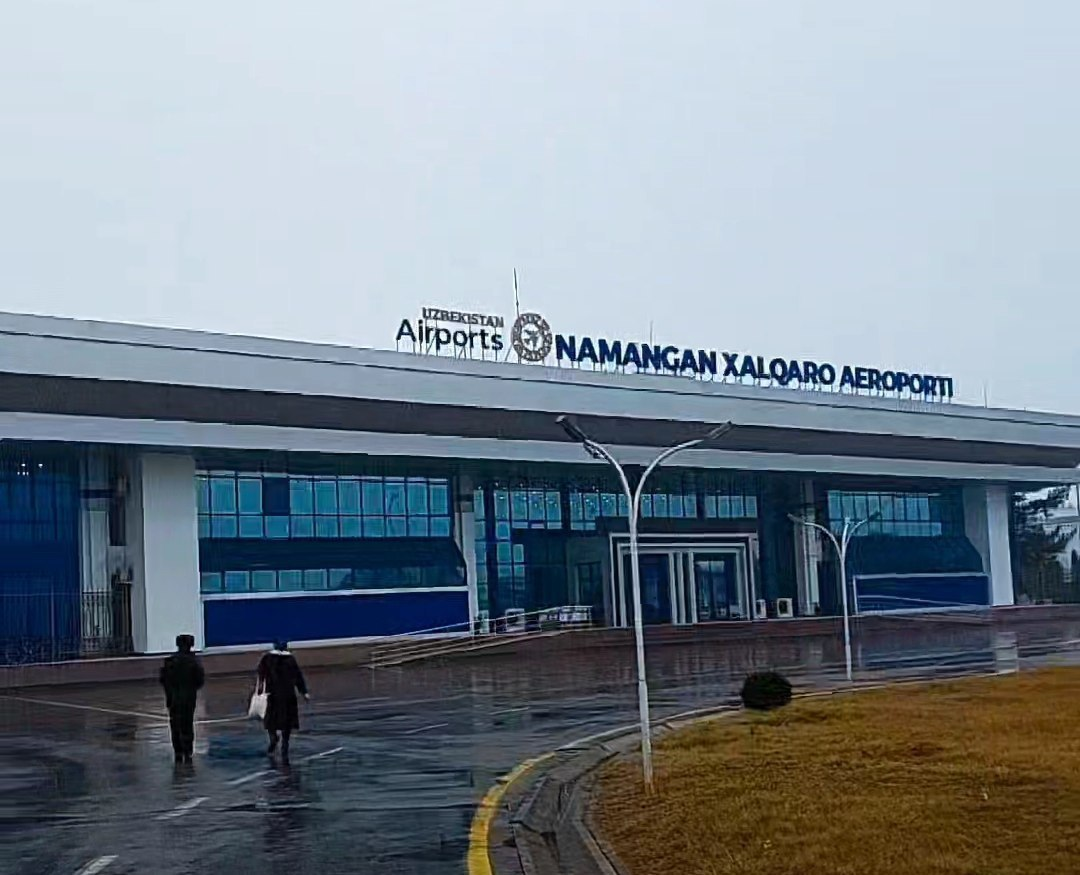

Airlines	Destinations
Centrum Air	Istanbul, Moscow–Domodedovo, Novosibirsk, Saint Petersburg
flyadeal	Medina
Flynas	Jeddah, Medina
Jazeera Airways	Kuwait City
Nordwind Airlines	Kazan
Qanot Sharq	Istanbul, Moscow–Domodedovo, Saint Petersburg
Red Wings Airlines	Makhachkala
Silk Avia	Tashkent
Ural Airlines	Moscow–Domodedovo, Moscow–Zhukovsky, Sochi, Yekaterinburg
Uzbekistan Airways	Delhi, Irkutsk. Krasnodar, Kransnoyarsk, Moscow–Vnukovo, Nizhnevartovsk, Perm, Saint Petersburg, Samara, Sochi, Tashkent, Ufa, Yekaterinburg

== See also ==
- List of the busiest airports in the former USSR
- Transportation in Uzbekistan
