= Tashkent International Airport =

Main airport in Uzbekistan

Islam Karimov Tashkent International Airport Islom Karimov nomidagi Toshkent xalqaro aeroporti (Uzbek)

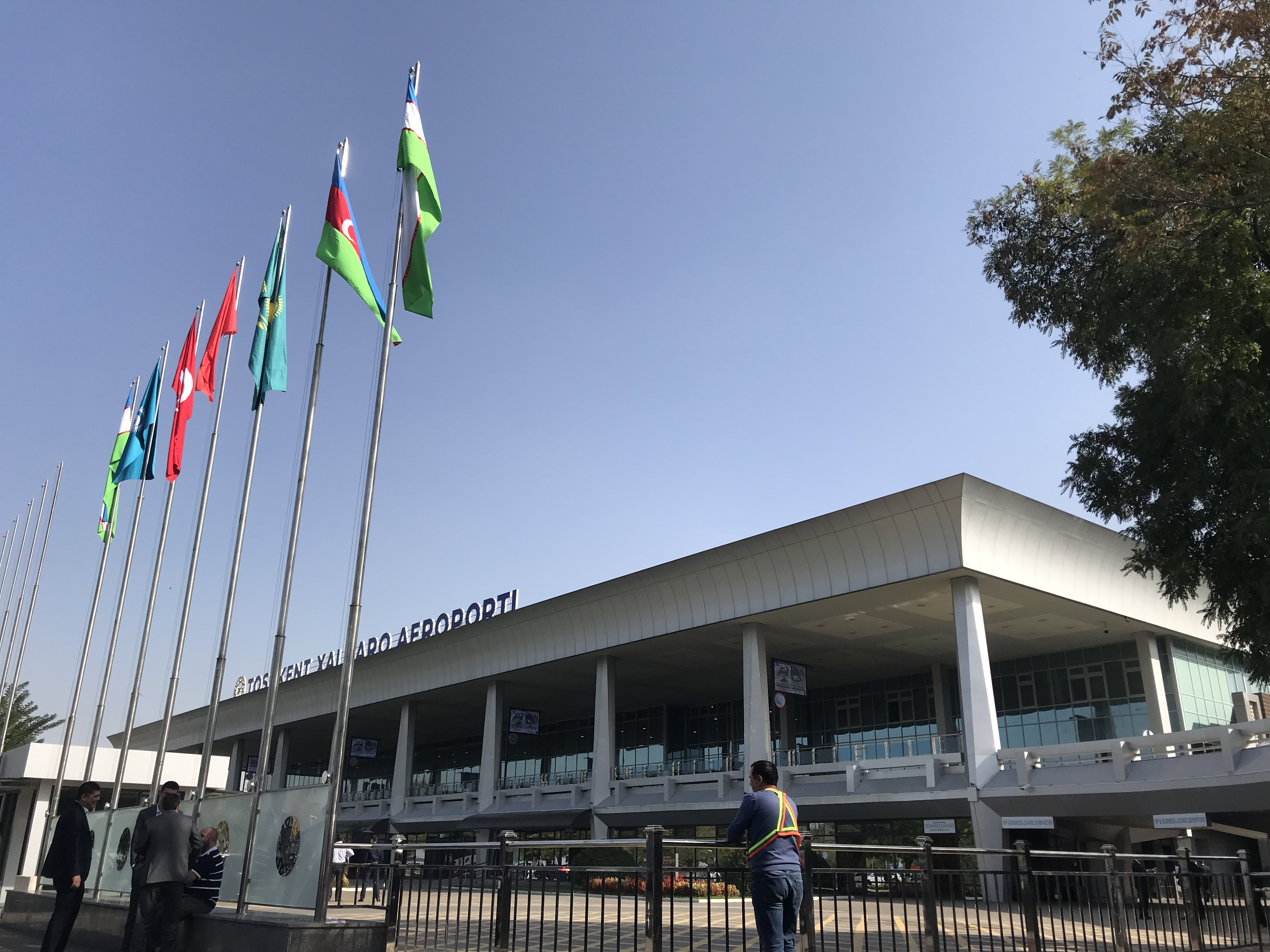
- IATA: TAS; ICAO: UZTT

Summary
- Airport type: Public
- Owner: Government of Uzbekistan
- Serves: Tashkent
- Location: Tashkent, Uzbekistan
- Hub for: Centrum Air; FlyOne Asia; My Freighter Airlines; Qanot Sharq; Uzbekistan Airways; Silk Avia
- Focus city for: Ural Airlines; Turkish Airlines
- Elevation AMSL: 1,417 ft (432 m)
- Coordinates: 41°15′28″N 69°16′52″E
- Website: https://tashkent-airport.uz/

Map
- Location of airport in Uzbekistan

Runways
Direction	Length		Surface
Direction	ft	m	Surface
08L/26R	13,123	4,000	Concrete
08R/26L	12,812	3,905	Asphalt

Statistics (2025)
- Number of passengers: ▲9,986,445
- Uzbek Aeronautical Information Publication

Islam Karimov Tashkent International Airport (Note: Uzbek: Islom Karimov nomidagi Toshkent xalqaro aeroporti, cyrillized: Ислом Каримов номидаги Тошкент халқаро аэропорти) (IATA: TAS, ICAO: UZTT) is the main international airport in Uzbekistan, the second busiest airport in Central Asia (after Almaty International Airport in Kazakhstan), and the 7th busiest airport in the former Soviet Union. It is located within the city, about 6 kilometres (3.7 miles) south of the center of Tashkent. It was named after Islam Karimov, the first president of independent Uzbekistan from 1991 to 2016.

Construction of a New Tashkent International Airport is currently underway in the Oʻrtachirchiq and Quyichirchiq districts of the Tashkent Region, 7 km from Yangiyoʻl. A groundbreaking ceremony was held in October 2025, and the airport is scheduled to open in late 2030. The current airport was designed for 11 million passengers a year, cannot expand because it is surrounded by the city, and is expected to reach capacity by 2029. Following its completion, the existing Islam Karimov Tashkent International Airport is slated to close.

== History ==
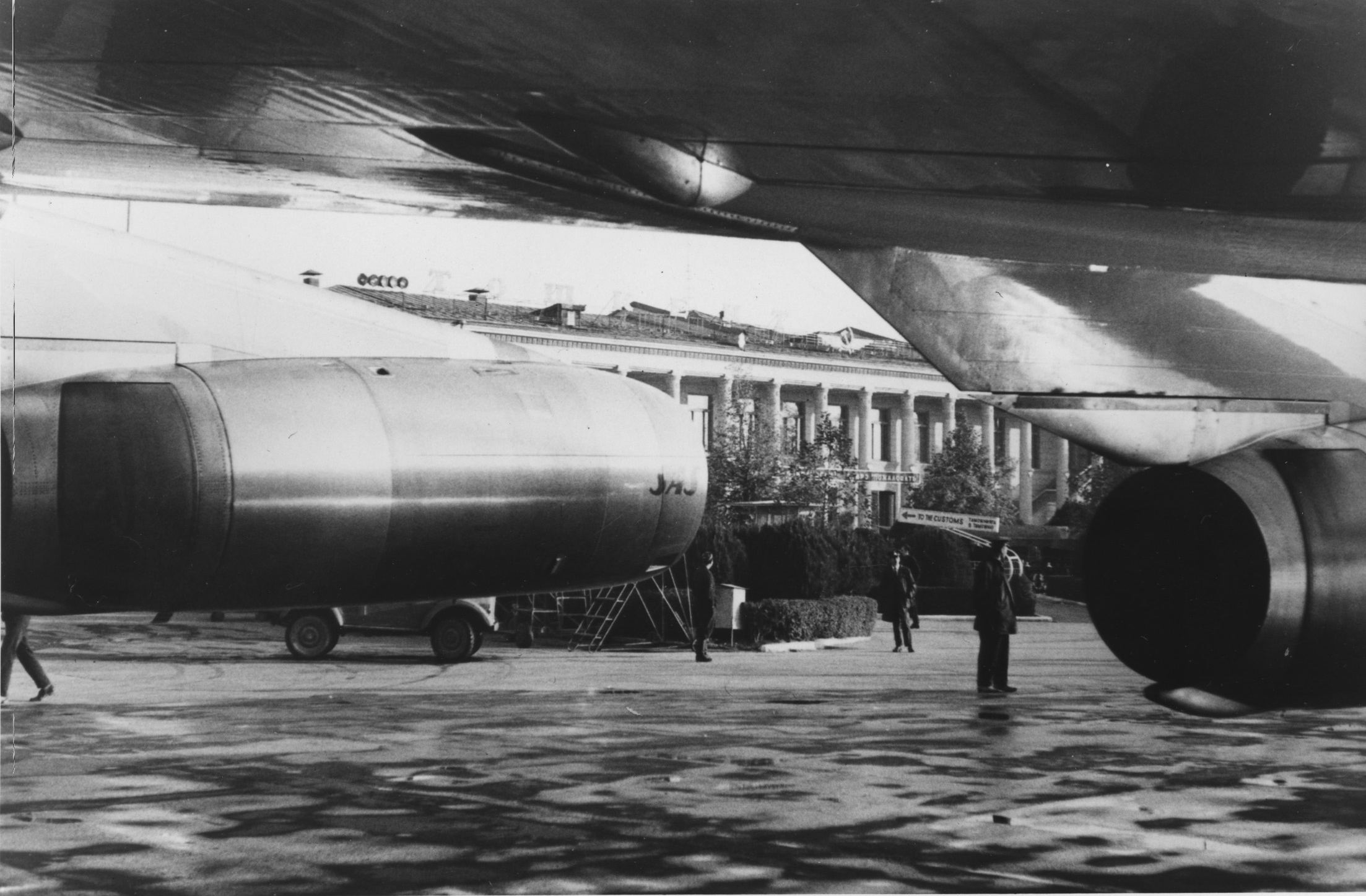
Douglas DC-8 of Scandinavian Airlines pictured during a stopover in Tashkent in the Uzbek SSR

The history of Tashkent Airport dates back to the early 20th century. On 12 May 1924, the first passenger flight was completed on a Junkers aircraft along the Tashkent–Pishpek–Alma-Ata route.

On 8 August 1930, the first airlift connected Moscow with Tashkent. The first Moscow-Tashkent-Moscow flight was operated on a K-4 aircraft.

In 1957, the Tu-104 jet aircraft began operating on the Moscow-Tashkent-Moscow route. This was preceded by a radical upgrade of the radar and communication services. New landing systems, RSP-4, were introduced in Tashkent. Then, the Romashka radar system was deployed.

In 1958, Tashkent Airport was granted the status of an international airport of Class I.

In 1967, the Yakovlev Yak-40 and Tupolev Tu-134 aircraft were introduced. The capital of Uzbekistan was connected by direct air links with Leningrad, Novosibirsk, Sverdlovsk, Chelyabinsk, Simferopol, cities of the Baltic states, the Caucasus, and the Far East.

On 20 September 1972, the supersonic Tu-144 aircraft made its first flight on the Moscow-Tashkent-Moscow route. The cruising speed of the airliner reached 2,500 km/h (1,600 mph), and it covered the distance from Moscow to Tashkent in 1 hour and 50 minutes.

In 1976, a new terminal complex opened at the airport.

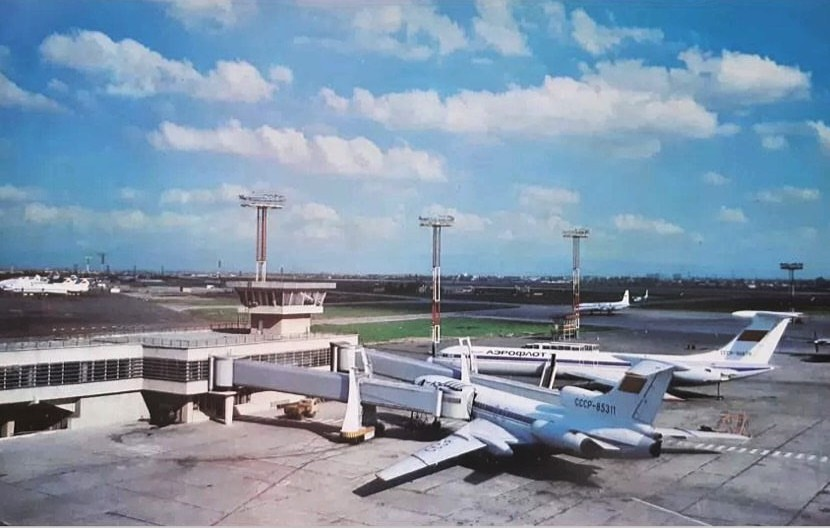
A picture of Tashkent Airport in the 1980s. The TU-154 registered as CCCP-85311 in the bottom right of the picture, crashed as Aeroflot Flight 5143.

=== Independent Uzbekistan ===
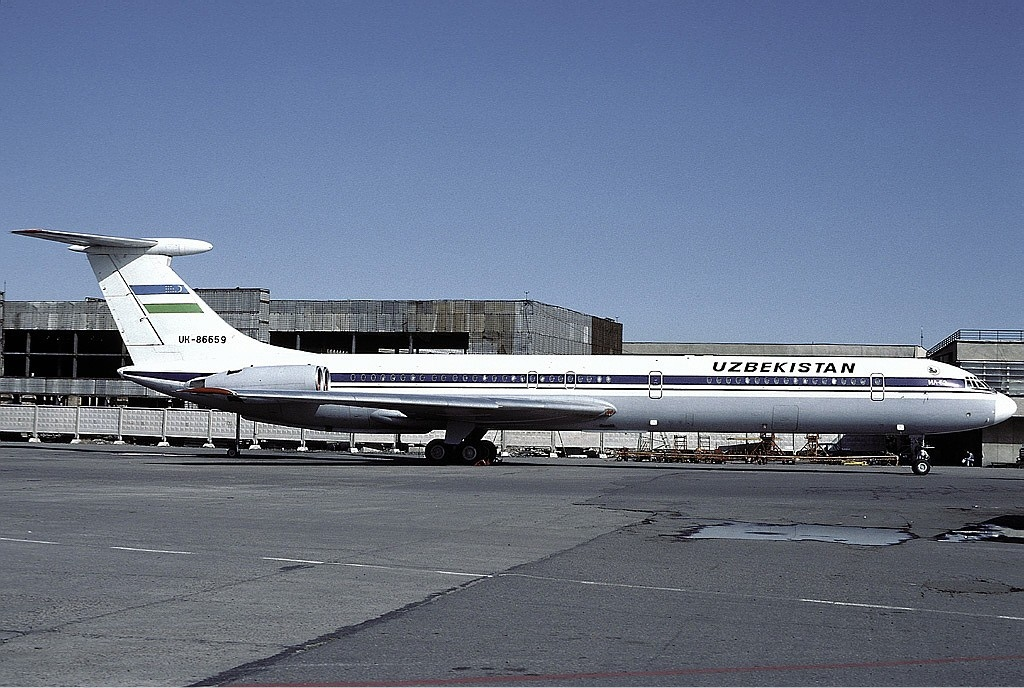
Uzbekistan Airways Ilyushin Il-62M aircraft at Tashkent International Airport

On 28 January 1992, Uzbekistan Airways was established. In the same year, the airline, under its code HY, operated its first international flight from Tashkent to London on an Il-62 aircraft.

In 1993, the airport served 1,409,900 passengers. During the mid-1990s, significant renovations were carried out with the help of Western construction companies.

This ICAO Category II airport is the primary hub of Uzbekistan Airways, and the largest international airport in Uzbekistan. The airport comprises two terminals: Terminal 2 receives international flights, and Terminal 3 is for domestic traffic.

In March 1995, Uzbekistan Airways started flights from Tashkent to New York City via Riga. It used Airbus A310s on the route. Terminal 2 was rebuilt in 2001, giving it a capacity of 1,000 passengers per hour. A further reconstruction, completed by April 2022, doubled its capacity. Facilities include waiting lounges, CIP and VIP halls, restaurants and bars, currency exchange offices, duty-free shops, airlines ticket counters and sales offices, and a 24-hour pharmacy.

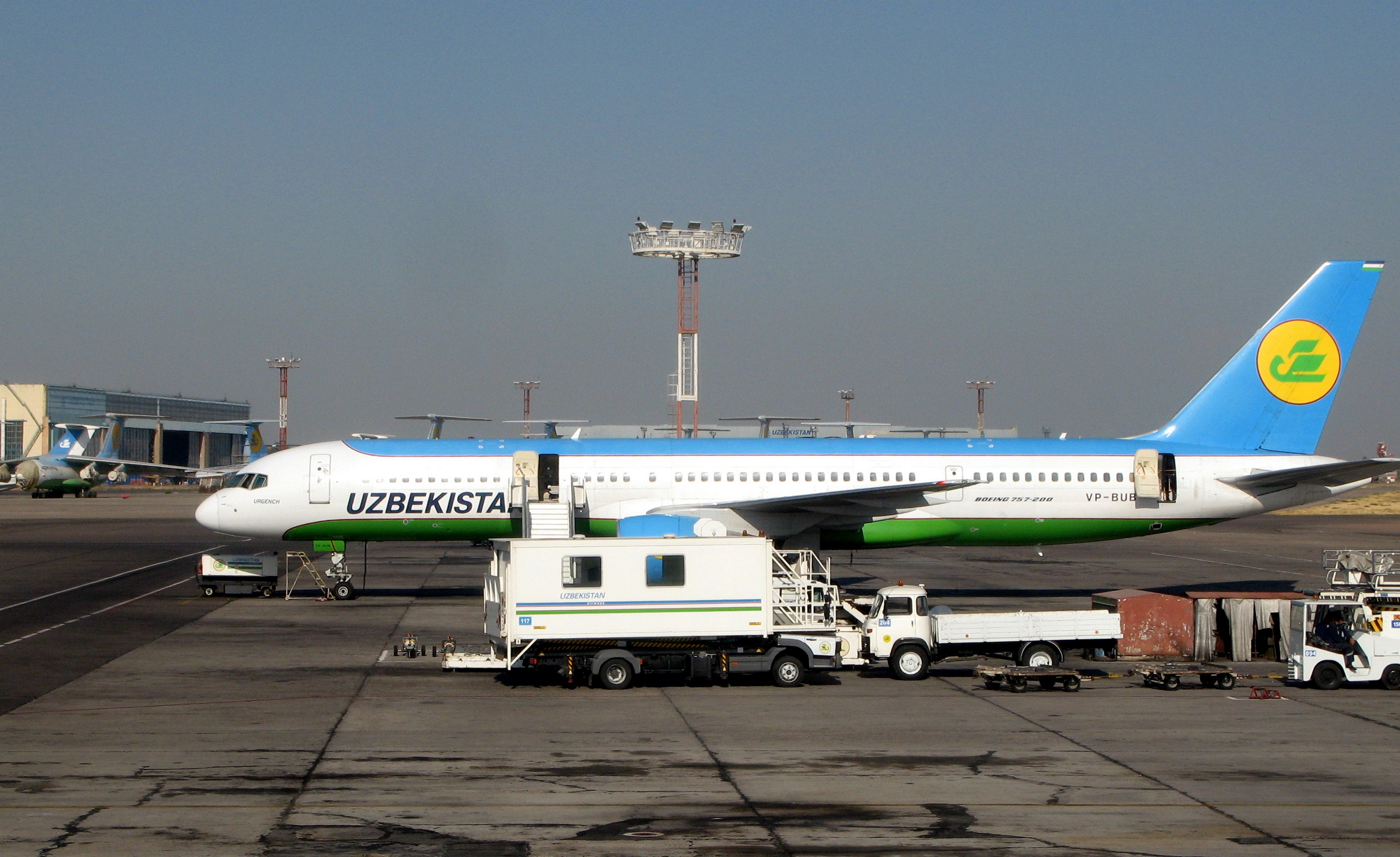
Uzbekistan Airways Boeing 757-200 at Tashkent International Airport

Terminal 3 opened in 2011 with a capacity of 400 passengers per hour. The two terminals are separated by the runways and lie about 4 km (2.5 mi) apart by road, requiring passengers transiting from international to domestic flights and vice versa to exit the airport in order to transfer between them; a free shuttle bus between the terminals was introduced in 2022. In July 2017, Uzbekistan Airways began offering nonstop service to New York using its Boeing 787 fleet.

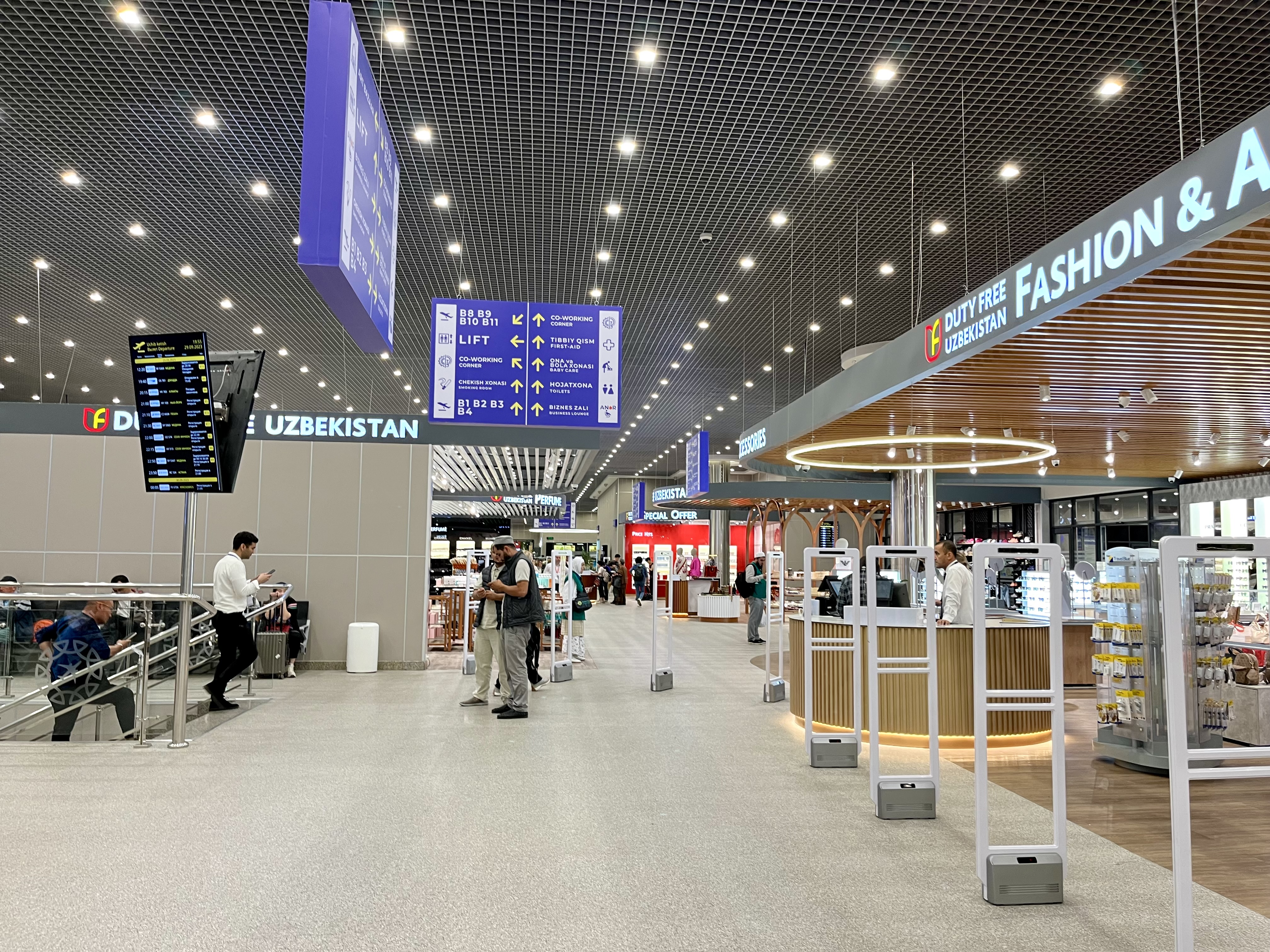
Tashkent International Airport duty-free shops

On 25 January 2017, the airport was named after Uzbekistan's First President, Islam Karimov.

On 2 October 2025, the airport's ICAO code changed from UTTT to UZTT, as Uzbekistan replaced its Soviet-era "UT" prefix with "UZ".

=== Expansion ===
Since 2021, the area of the international terminal at Tashkent International Airport has expanded by nearly 50%, growing from 45,000 to 65,000 square metres (484,376 to 699,654 sq ft).

In August 2024, another stage of building expansion was completed at Tashkent International Airport's terminal. Large-scale reconstruction works included the renovation of the facade, the departure hall, and the waiting areas for passengers and visitors. A drop-off zone for passengers was added near the entrance, allowing vehicles to approach the first floor. A new hall for passengers and those seeing them off was also introduced, along with a small green recreation area equipped with benches. The airport also began testing a passenger monitoring system called Pax Track.

In November 2024, Tashkent International Airport began an expansion of its arrival hall. The terminal's façade will be extended forward, increasing the area nearly twofold. The expansion will allow for the addition of two baggage carousels and a new area for meet-and-greet services inside the building. The arrival hall's area is set to increase by 2,500 square metres (26,910 sq ft), expanding from the original 5,300 square metres (57,049 sq ft). The final phase involves the merger of the departure and arrival terminals. This will create a unified airport complex with a capacity to handle 2,400 passengers per hour. The first stage opened in June 2025: the hall grew by 2,100 square metres (22,604 sq ft) and gained an extra baggage carousel, a 120-seat meeting area and a 120-space car park. A second stage was planned for the end of 2025.

In 2024, the airport served 8.7 million passengers, which is 28% more than the previous year's results. In 2025 it handled 9,986,445 passengers and 79,958 flights; more than 86% of passengers travelled on international routes. It is the busiest airport in Uzbekistan as well as the 7th busiest in the former Soviet Union.

As of 2024, the airport planned to merge its arrival and departure terminals by 2026.

== Facilities ==
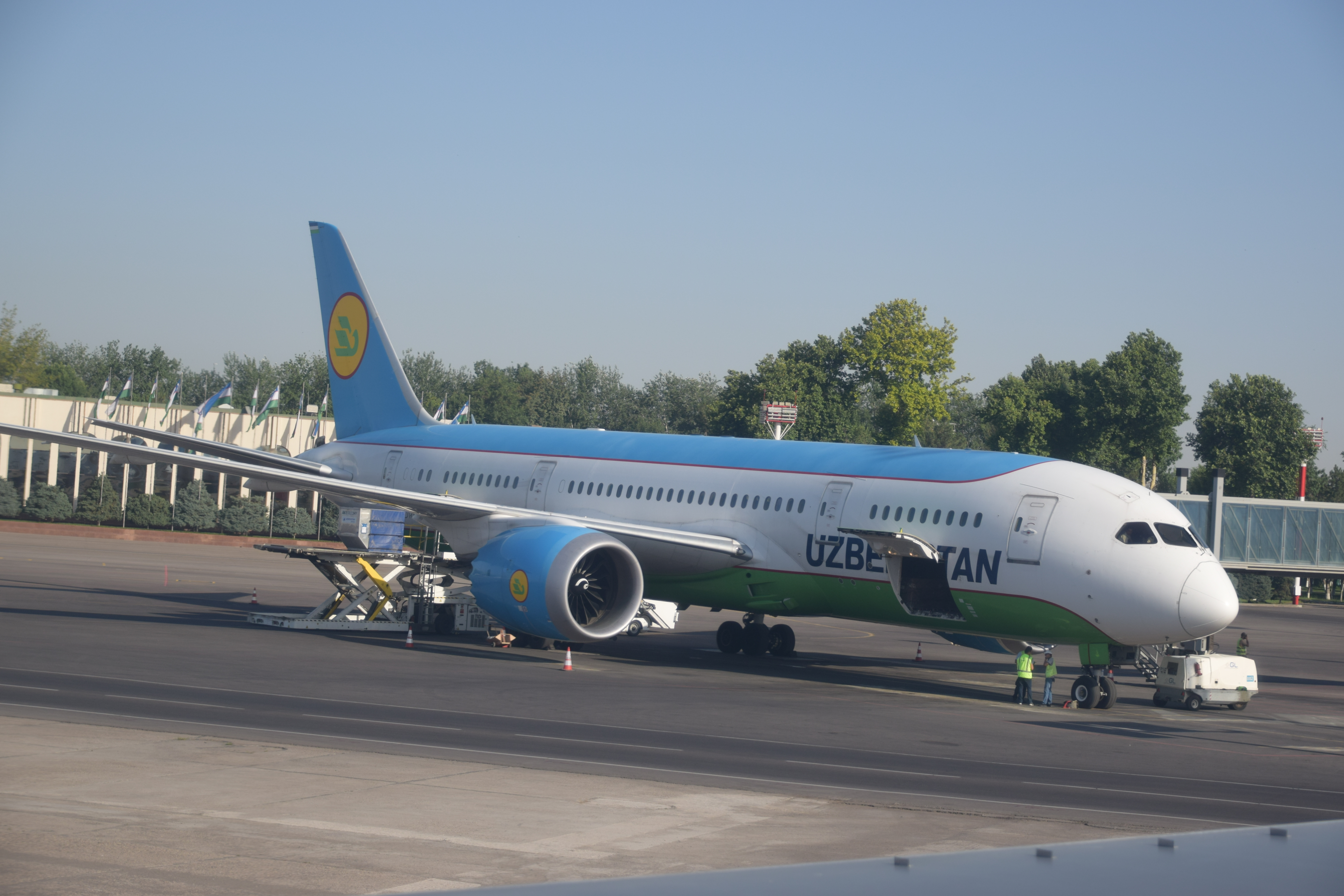
Boeing 787 of Uzbekistan Airways in Tashkent International Airport

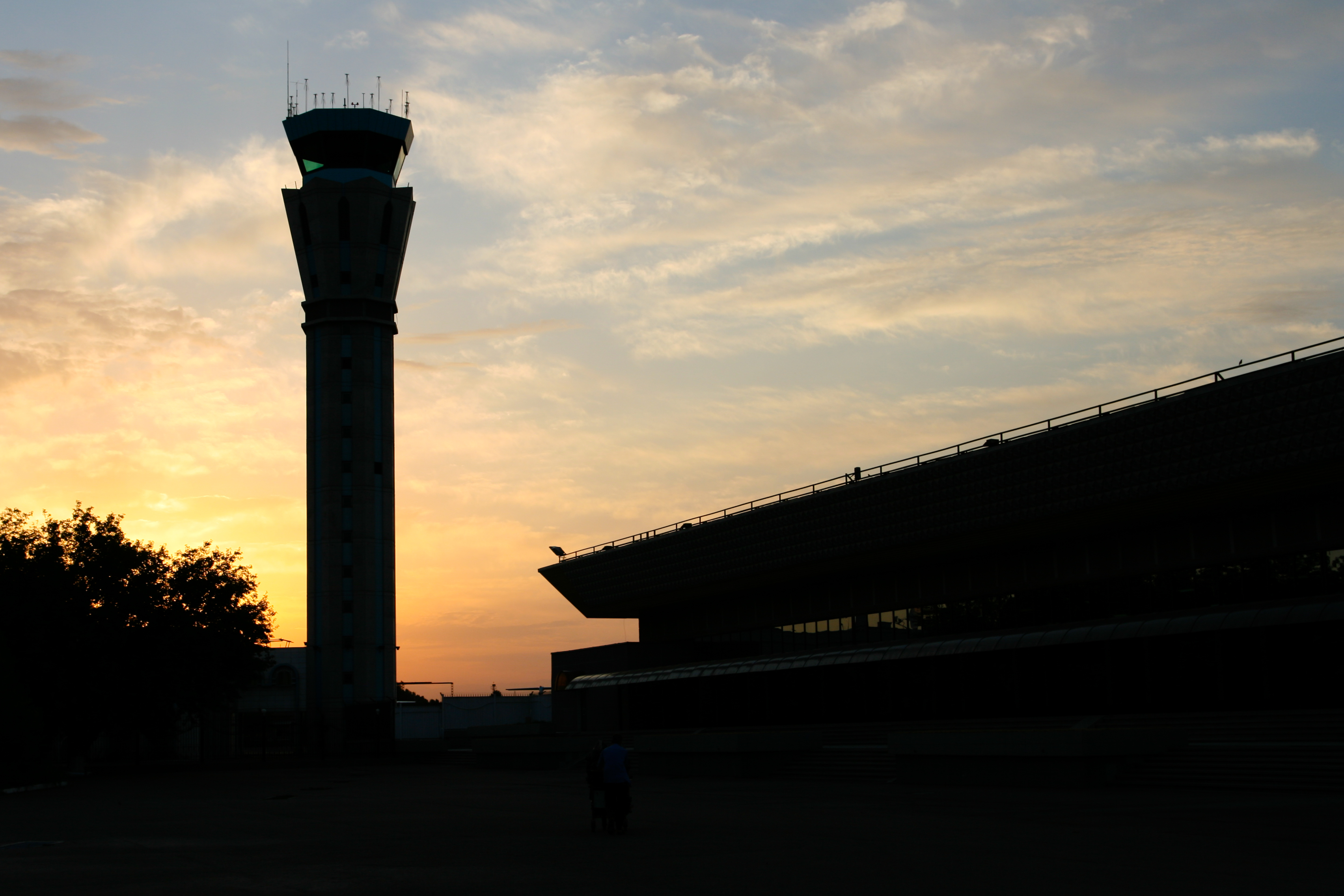
Tashkent International Airport control tower

=== Airfield ===
Covering an area of 100 ha (250 acres), the airfield includes 110 parking spaces for aircraft. It has two parallel runways, northern and southern, each about 4,000 m (13,123 ft) long, which allow it to receive any long-haul aircraft without restrictions, including the Boeing 787. Runway 08L/26R measures 4,000 metres (13,123 ft) in length and 60 metres (197 ft) in width. Runway 08R/26L is 3,905 metres (12,812 ft) long and 60 metres (197 ft) wide.

Runway 08L/26R was reinforced and re-equipped in 2021 and is certified to ICAO Category II, allowing landings with a runway visual range of at least 300 m (984 ft). Runway 08R/26L, last rebuilt in 1996, was closed for reconstruction from August 2022 to April 2023 at a cost of 120 billion soums (about US$10 million). It reopened with a pavement classification number of 69, allowing loads of up to 285 tonnes, and a Category I landing system; the first aircraft to land on it was an Uzbekistan Airways Boeing 787 arriving from Dubai. In October 2023, the airport began an overhaul of part of its apron and taxiway B, covering 92,000 m^{2} (990,280 sq ft) of pavement last repaired in the 2000s.

=== Terminal ===
As of 2015, 56 monitors displayed passenger information in the terminal, and an electronic ticketing system was in place.

In February 2023, a 2,640 m^{2} (28,417 sq ft) section of the international terminal's airside "sterile" zone opened, with an additional duty-free shop, an "Art Bazaar" of shops selling handicrafts, national foods, electronics and SIM cards, a pharmacy, a café-bar and a coworking corner.

Since 2024, a 24-room hotel for passengers has been operational at Tashkent International Airport.

The international terminal has three premium lounges. An upgraded CIP lounge for arriving passengers opened in September 2022, with dedicated passport control booths, express baggage delivery, 75 seats and its own duty-free shop. The Anjir Business Lounge, the third after the CIP lounge and the Anor lounge, opened in the departure area's sterile zone in February 2025. Operated by Azerbaijan's VIP Services Group, it covers 427 m^{2} (4,596 sq ft) over two floors, seats 116 passengers and is open around the clock.

== Services ==
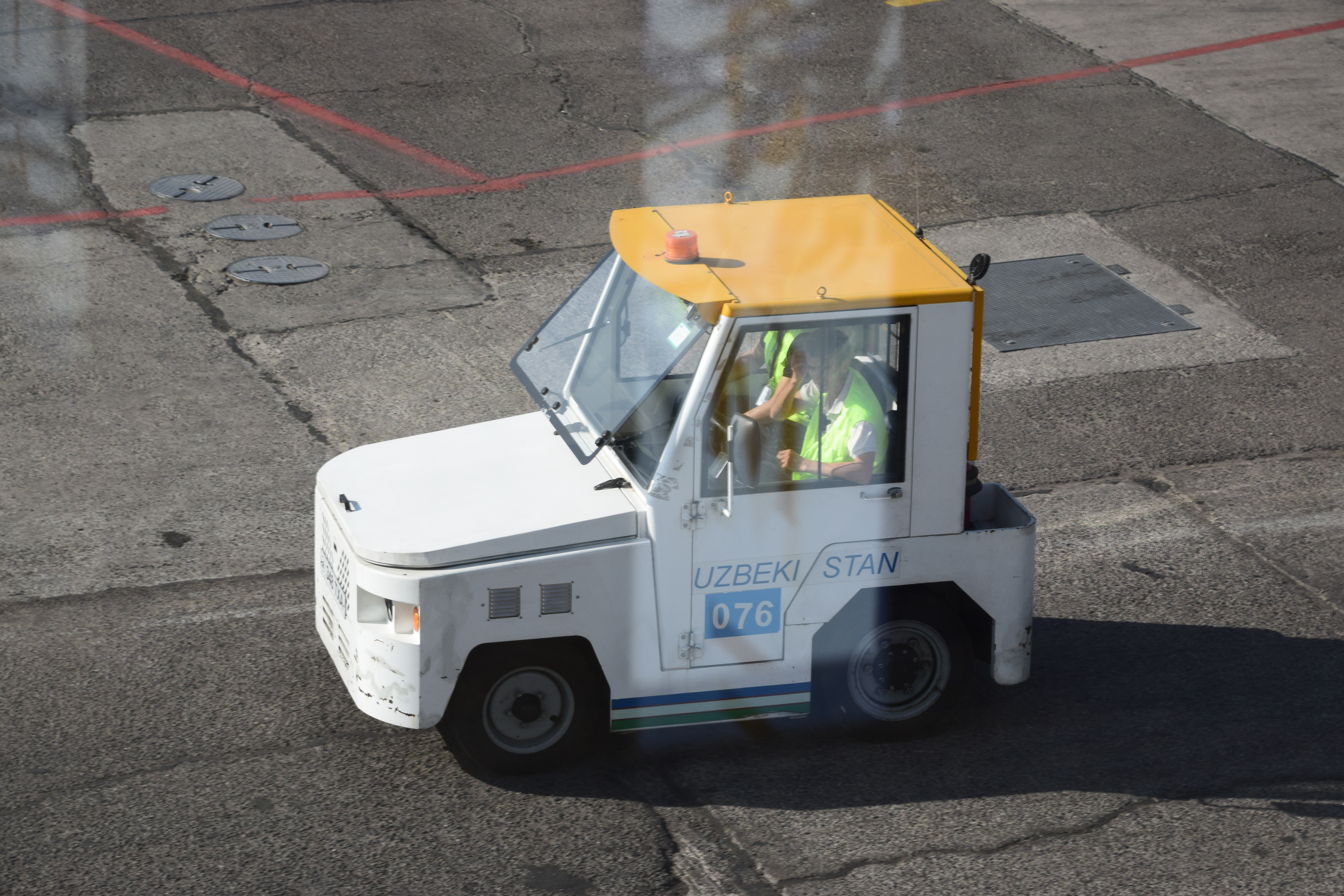
Towing tractors at Tashkent International Airport

The airport is equipped with a variety of vehicles for technical services, including Mulag Comet and Nissan towing tractors, Hunnert Gmbh water dispensers, Mitsubishi Fuso Rosa passenger buses, and Alfons Cak fuel dispensers.

== Airlines and destinations ==
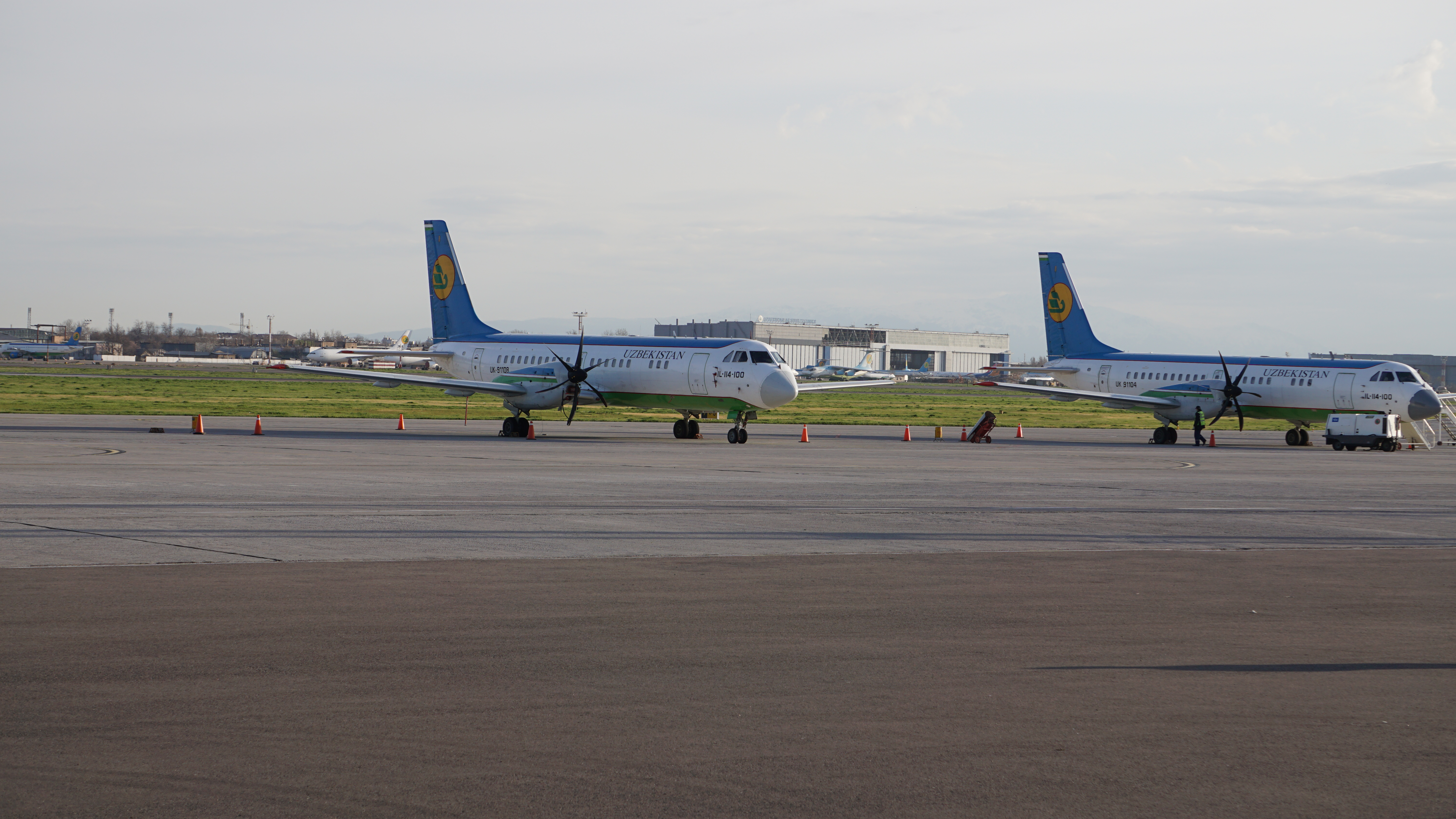
Ilyushin Il-114 of Uzbekistan Airways at Tashkent International Airport

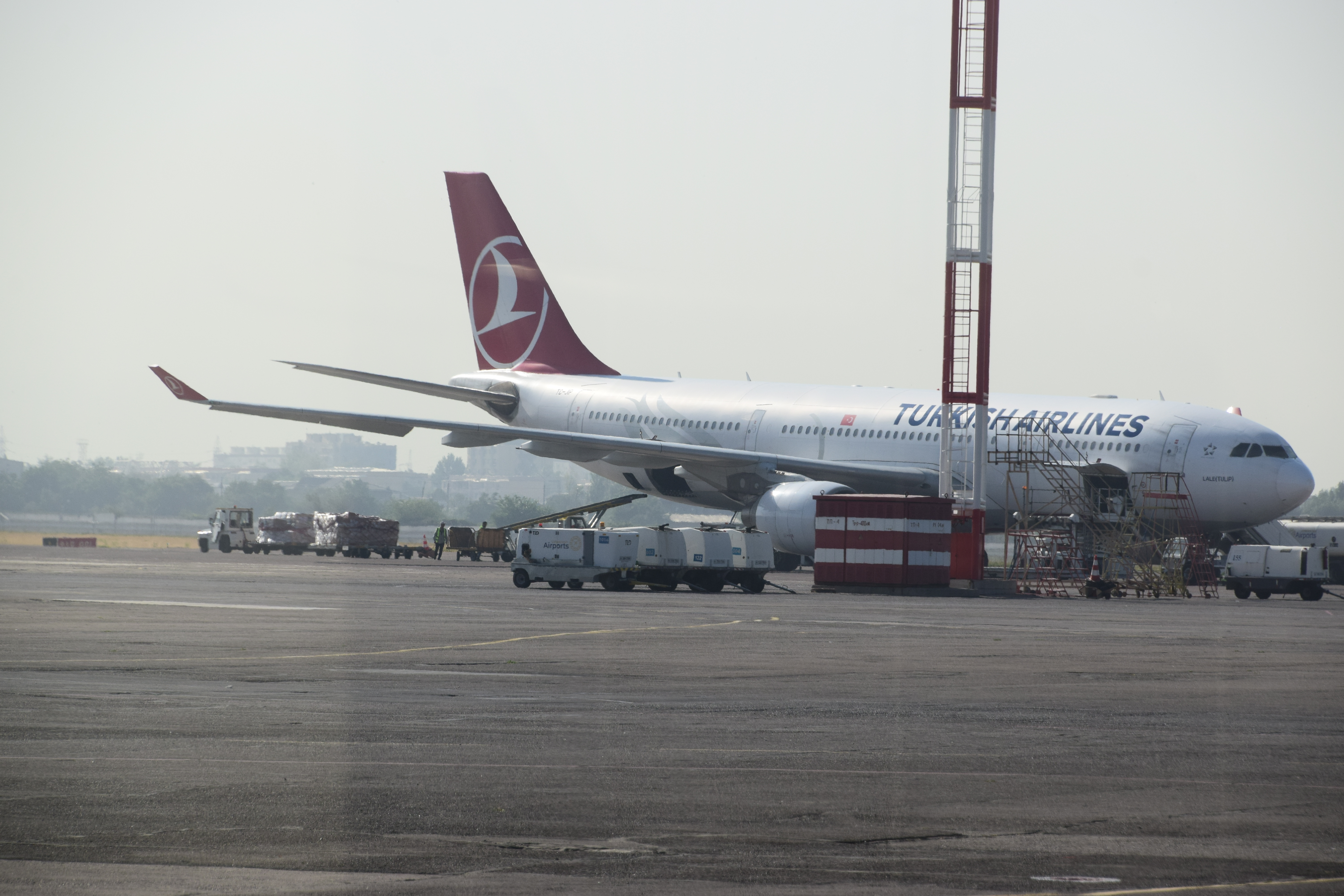
Turkish Airlines Airbus A330-200 at Tashkent International Airport

The airport is considered one of the largest and most modern airports in Central Asia. It has flights to Europe, Southeast Asia and the United States.

Tashkent International Airport is the hub for Uzbekistan Airways, the national carrier of Uzbekistan, which operates an extensive network of direct flights to numerous destinations. The airport serves several other international airlines that connect Tashkent with destinations primarily in the CIS region. Turkish Airlines also has a significant presence at the airport, increasing its Istanbul service to 28 weekly flights in March 2026, with plans for 35 weekly flights from June 2026.

=== Passenger ===
Airlines	Destinations
Aero Nomad Airlines	Bishkek
Aeroflot	Moscow–Sheremetyevo, Saint Petersburg
Air Arabia	Abu Dhabi, Ras Al Khaimah, Sharjah
Air Astana	Almaty, Astana
Air Cairo	Seasonal charter: Sharm El Sheikh
Air China	Beijing–Capital, Chongqing, Ürümqi
Air Samarkand	Seasonal charter: Doha, İzmir, Sharm El Sheikh
AirAsia X	Kuala Lumpur–International
AJet	Ankara
Asiana Airlines	Seoul–Incheon
Asman Airlines	Tamchy
AZAL	Baku
azimuth	Krasnodar, Mineralnye Vody
Batik Air Malaysia	Kuala Lumpur–International, Langkawi
Belavia	Minsk
Centrum Air	Almaty, Antalya, Aqtöbe, Astana, Baku, Bangkok–Suvarnabhumi, Bishkek, Bukhara, Chelyabinsk (begins 4 December 2026), Delhi–Indira Gandhi, Dubai–International, Fergana, Grozny, Guangzhou, Hyderabad, Istanbul, Karachi, Kazan, Krasnodar, Krasnoyarsk–International, Lahore, Malé, Mineralnye Vody, Moscow–Sheremetyevo, Nha Trang, Novosibirsk, Nukus, Omsk, Oral, Osh, Perm, Phuket, Qostanai, Saint Petersburg, Salalah, Samara, Seoul–Incheon, Sochi, Tbilisi, Tel Aviv, Tyumen (begins 3 January 2027), Ufa, Ulan-Ude, Urgench, Vladivostok, Yekaterinburg; Seasonal: Frankfurt, Hambantota–Mattala
China Eastern Airlines	Shanghai–Pudong, Xi'an
China Southern Airlines	Beijing–Daxing, Guangzhou, Ürümqi
Etihad Airways	Abu Dhabi
Flyadeal	Jeddah
FlyArystan	Astana, Atyrau
flydubai	Dubai–International
Flykhiva	Batumi, Podgorica, Tbilisi
Flynas	Jeddah, Riyadh
FlyOne	Baku, Chișinău, Delhi–Indira Gandhi, Grozny, Kazan, Mineralnye Vody, Moscow–Vnukovo, Novosibirsk, Riga, Yekaterinburg, Yerevan
IndiGo	Mumbai–Shivaji
Jazeera Airways	Seasonal: Kuwait City
Kam Air	Kabul
Loong Air	Chengdu–Tianfu
LOT Polish Airlines	Warsaw–Chopin
Malaysia Airlines	Seasonal charter: Langkawi (begins 5 December 2026)
Nordwind Airlines	Kazan
Oman Air	Muscat
Pobeda	Moscow-Vnukovo
Qanot Sharq	Almaty, Beijing–Daxing, Bishkek, Guangzhou, Hangzhou, Istanbul, London–Gatwick, Milan–Malpensa, Moscow–Domodedovo, New York–JFK, Nha Trang, Sanya, Seoul–Incheon, Tel Aviv, Trabzon; Seasonal: Prague; Seasonal charter: Denpasar, Phuket
Qatar Airways	Doha
Red Sea Airlines	Seasonal charter: Sharm El Sheikh
Red Wings Airlines	Makhachkala
Rossiya Airlines	Saint Peterburg
Royal Jordanian	Amman–Queen Alia
S7 Airlines	Novosibirsk
Shirak Avia	Yerevan
Silk Avia	Andizhan, Bukhara, Fergana, Namangan, Navoi, Qarshi, Qoʻqon, Samarqand, Termez, Urgench, Zaamin
Somon Air	Dushanbe
SunExpress	İzmir
Turkish Airlines	Istanbul
Ural Airlines	Irkutsk, Moscow-Zhukovsky, Sochi, Yekaterinburg
Utair	Moscow-Vnukovo, Surgut, Tyumen, Ufa
UVT Aero	Kazan, Nizhnekamsk, Perm
Uzbekistan Airways	Almaty, Andizhan, Ankara, Astana, Atyrau, Bangkok–Suvarnabhumi, Beijing–Daxing, Bishkek, Bukhara, Delhi–Indira Gandhi, Dubai–International, Fergana, Grozny, Guangzhou, Hangzhou, Heydar, Irkutsk, Islamabad, Istanbul, Jeddah, Kazan, Khabarovsk, Krasnodar, Kuala Lumpur–International, Lahore, London–Gatwick, London–Heathrow, Madrid, Makhachkala, Milan–Malpensa, Mineralnye Vody, Minsk, Moscow–Domodedovo, Moscow–Vnukovo, Mumbai–Shivaji, Munich, Nha Trang, Namangan, New York–JFK, Nizhnevartovsk, Nizhny Novgorod, Paris–Charles de Gaulle, Phuket, Riga, Rome–Fiumicino, Saint Petersburg, Samarqand, Sanya, Seoul–Incheon, Sochi, Tbilisi, Tel Aviv, Termez, Tokyo–Narita, Ufa, Urgench, Ürümqi, Warsaw–Chopin (begins 5 April 2027), Yekaterinburg, Zaamin; Seasonal: Phu Quoc, Sharm El Sheikh; Seasonal charter: Mauritius (begins 26 December 2026)

=== Cargo ===
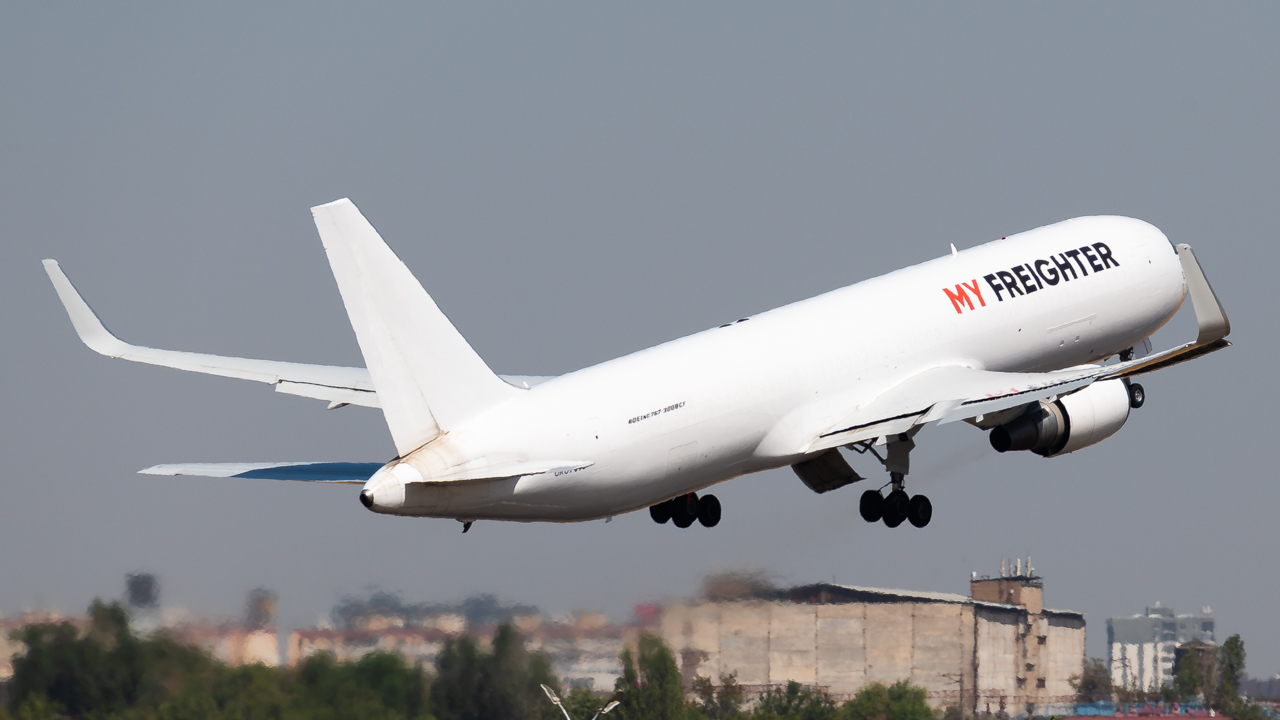
My Freighter Airlines Boeing 767-300F taking off from Tashkent Airport

Airlines	Destinations
My Freighter	Amsterdam, Astana, Batumi, Bishkek, Budapest, Dhaka, Dubai–International, Dushanbe, Hangzhou, Istanbul, Jeddah, Madrid, Nairobi, Shanghai–Pudong, Tbilisi, Turkmenabat, Wenzhou, Zhengzhou
YTO Cargo Airlines	Hangzhou, Yining

== Statistics ==
Annual passenger traffic at Tashkent International Airport
Year	Passengers	Change	Ref.
2023	c. 6,800,000	—	
2024	8,725,521	▲28%	
2025	9,986,445	▲14.5%	

== Transportation ==
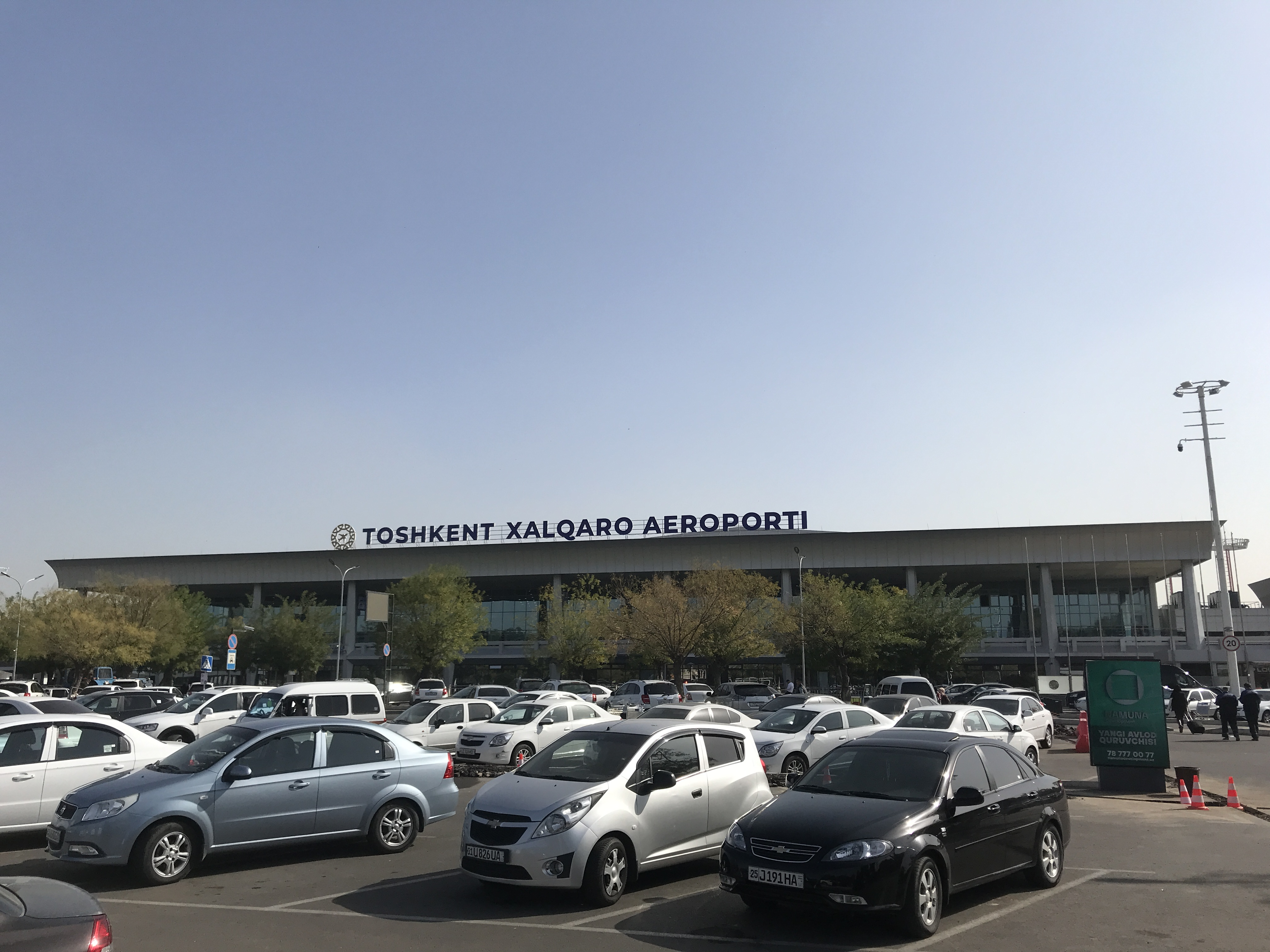
Parking

At Tashkent International Airport, vehicles are permitted to approach the first floor for passenger drop-offs. Short-term parking is allowed for up to 10 minutes. After this time, integrated cameras with the traffic control system will automatically issue a fine notification to the driver.

=== Taxi ===
There are local Uzbek companies Bobur Diyor, MyTaxi and Russian Yandex Taxi offering services at Tashkent International Airport.

== Incidents ==
On 28 September 2023, an explosion and fire at a warehouse near the airport killed one person and injured 162.

== See also ==
- List of the busiest airports in the former USSR
- Transportation in Uzbekistan
