= Bukhara International Airport =

Airport in Uzbekistan

Bukhara International Airport Buxoro Xalqaro Aeroporti
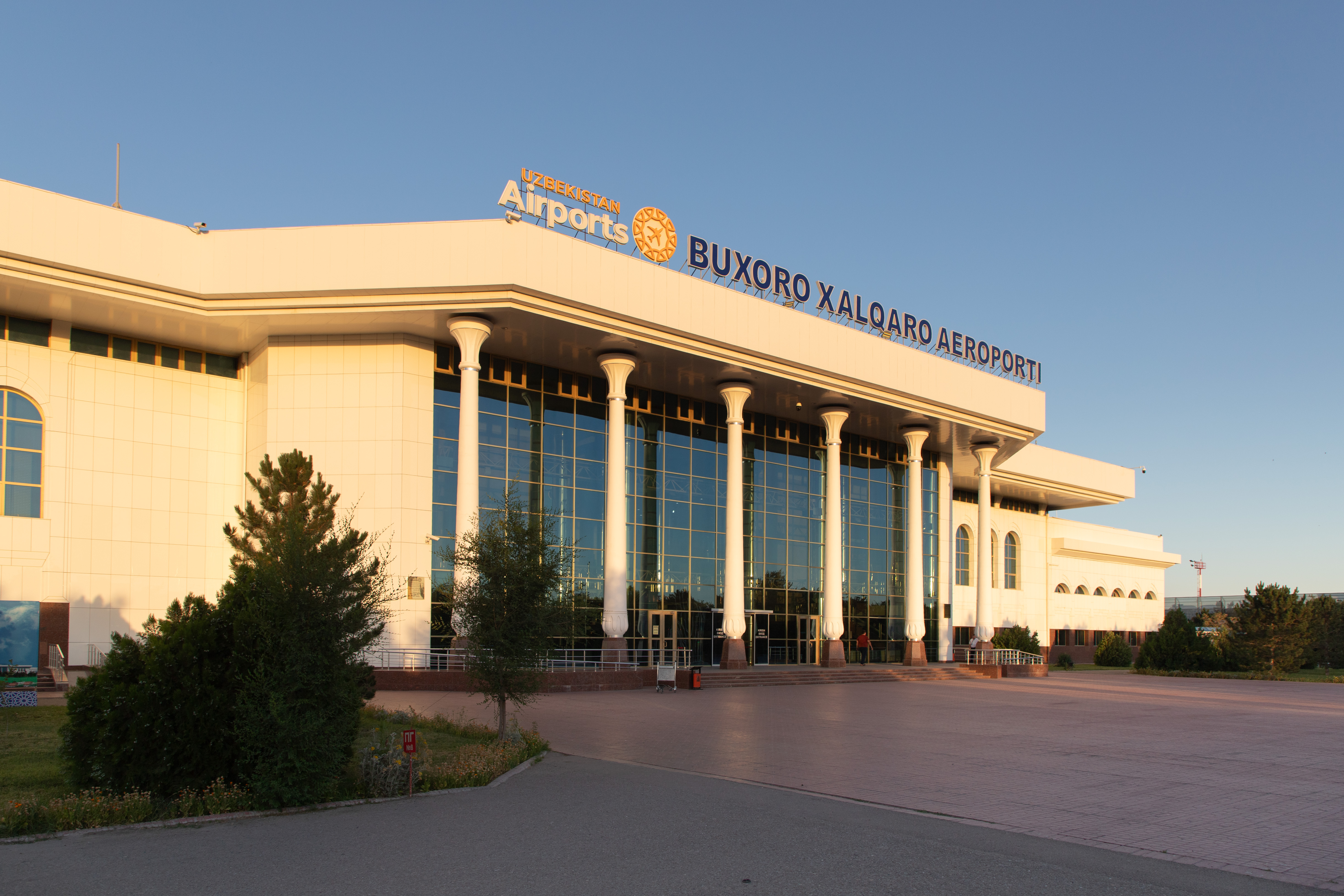
- IATA: BHK; ICAO: UZSB

Summary
- Airport type: Public
- Owner: Government of Uzbekistan
- Operator: JSC "Uzbekistan Airports"
- Serves: Bukhara
- Location: Bukhara, Uzbekistan
- Elevation AMSL: 229 m (751 ft)
- Coordinates: 39°46′30″N 064°29′00″E
- Website: https://uzairports.com/page/17

Map
- Location of airport in Uzbekistan

Runways
Direction	Length		Surface
Direction	m	ft	Surface
01/19	3,000	9,843	Asphalt
- Sources: Airport diagram, DAFIF

Bukhara International Airport (IATA: BHK, ICAO: UZSB) is an airport serving Bukhara, the capital city of the Bukhara Region in Uzbekistan.

== Facilities ==
The airport is at an elevation of 229 metres (751 ft) above mean sea level. It has one runway designated 01/19 with an asphalt surface measuring 3,000 by 45 metres (9,843 ft × 148 ft).

== Airlines and destinations ==
Airlines	Destinations
Aeroflot	Moscow–Sheremetyevo
Centrum Air	Samarqand, Tashkent, Urgench, Vladivostok
Pegasus Airlines	Istanbul-Sabiha Gökçen (begins 14 December 2026)
Qanot Sharq	Moscow–Domodedovo
Red Wings	Yekaterinburg
SCAT Airlines	Türkistan
Silk Avia	Urgench, Sariosiyo Tashkent
Turkish Airlines	Istanbul
Utair	Moscow-Vnukovo
Uzbekistan Airways	Moscow–Vnukovo, Saint Petersburg, Tashkent

== See also ==
- List of the busiest airports in the former USSR
- Transportation in Uzbekistan
