= Transport in Uzbekistan =

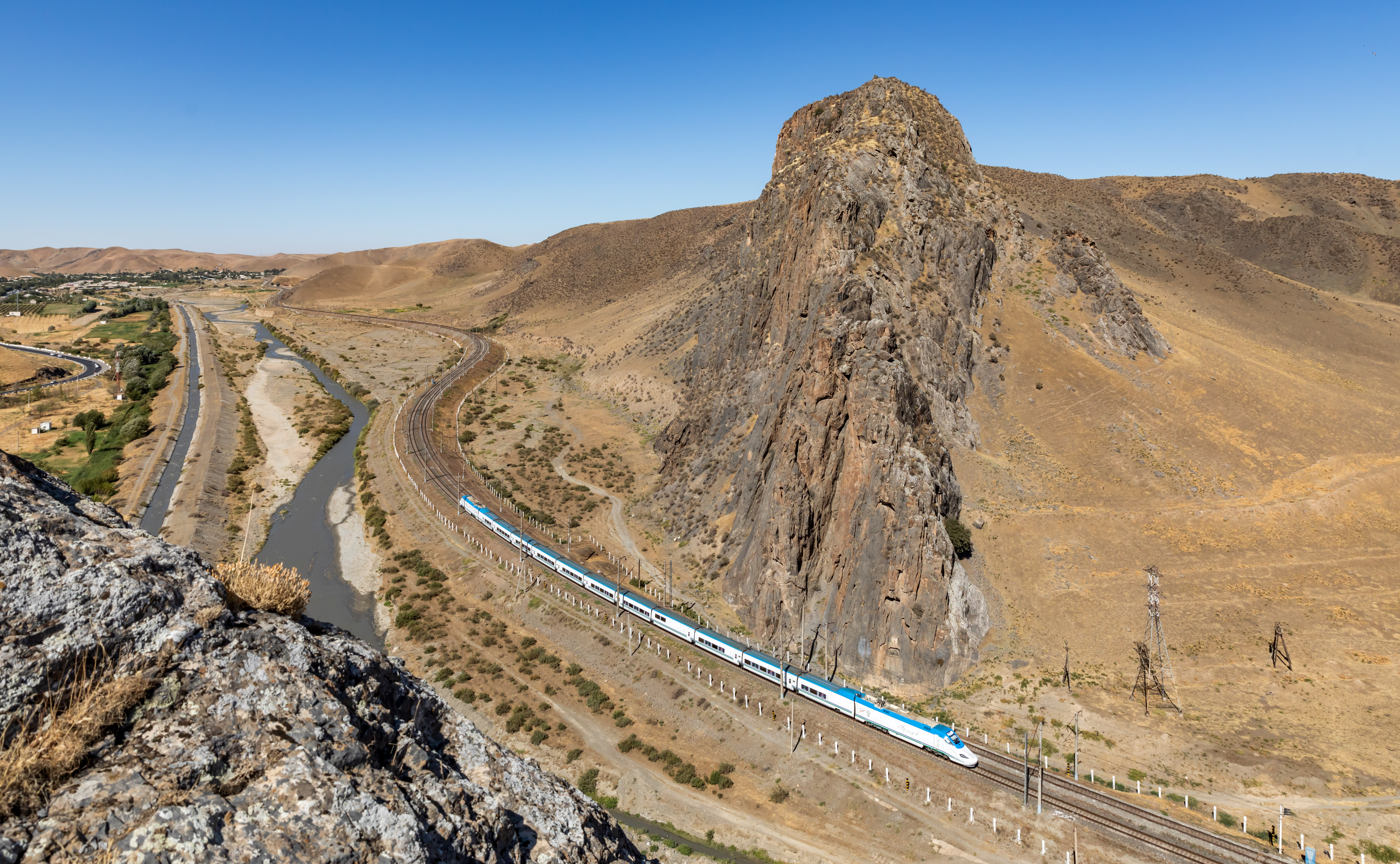
Afrosiyob train near Jizzax

Uzbekistan's overland transportation infrastructure declined in the post-Soviet era but Air transport received substantial government investment in the early 2000s as airport modernization projects were undertaken. Improvements have since been made to the surface transport network including the construction of the Tashkent–Samarkand high-speed rail line.

== Railways ==
As of March 2017, the total length of Uzbekistan's main railway network is 4,669 kilometres (2,901 mi), of which 2,446 km (1,520 mi) is electrified.

=== Trams and trolleybuses ===
Uzbekistan's one active tramway system is the Samarkand tram, and there are also trolleybuses in Urgench, both opened after the independence.

There were several other light rail and trolleybus systems in Uzbekistan, including the Tashkent Tram, which was the biggest tram system in Asia in 1990s, and the Tashkent Trolleybus.

=== Metro ===
The Tashkent Metro is the only rapid transit system in Uzbekistan. It was the only such system in Central Asia, until the opening of the Almaty Metro.

== Highways ==
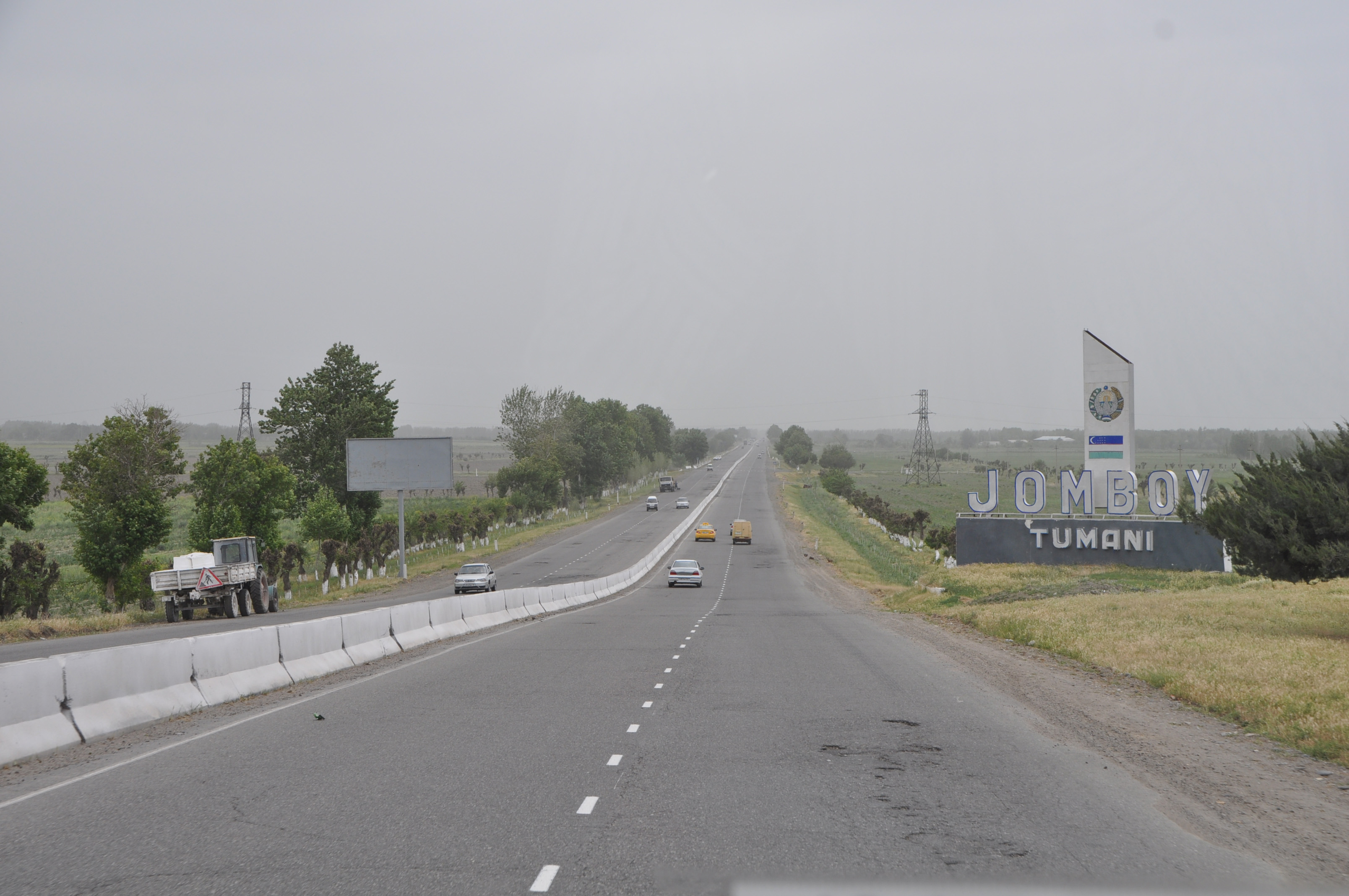
M39 Highway in Uzbekistan, near Jomboy

As of 2005, Uzbekistan had 84,400 km (52,400 mi) of roads, about 72,000 km (45,000 mi) of which were paved. The road infrastructure is deteriorating, particularly outside of Tashkent. No significant highway projects were underway in 2006. In the early 2000s, U.S. engineers improved some roads around the port of Termez to facilitate movement of humanitarian supplies to Afghanistan. Uzbekistan is a member country of the United Nations’ Asian Highway Network, and several national roads are designated as part of the network.

The M39 Highway, connecting Tashkent and Samarkand is a 4-laned road in some 300 km (190 mi) of its length, although poorly maintained and without carriageway separation in most of its length. In January, 2017, the Kazakhstan and Uzbekistan governments made an agreement to reopen the 65 km (40 mi) section of this highway which passed through Kazakhstan that had been closed for ten years, avoiding the detour via Guliston. The M37 Highway starts from Samarkand, reaching west to the Turkmen border, via Navoiy and Bukhara. The A373 Highway starts from Tashkent, going east through Kokand of Fergana Region, and ends at the Kyrgyz border.

In September 2019, The Asian Infrastructure Investment Bank proposed the Bukhara Road Network Improvement Project to improve the multiple assets of cross-border roads in Bukhara and the road networks in Karakalpakstan and Khorezm regions. The project finances were approved in June of 2020 and were estimated to take 214.7 million USD.

=== Highway classification ===
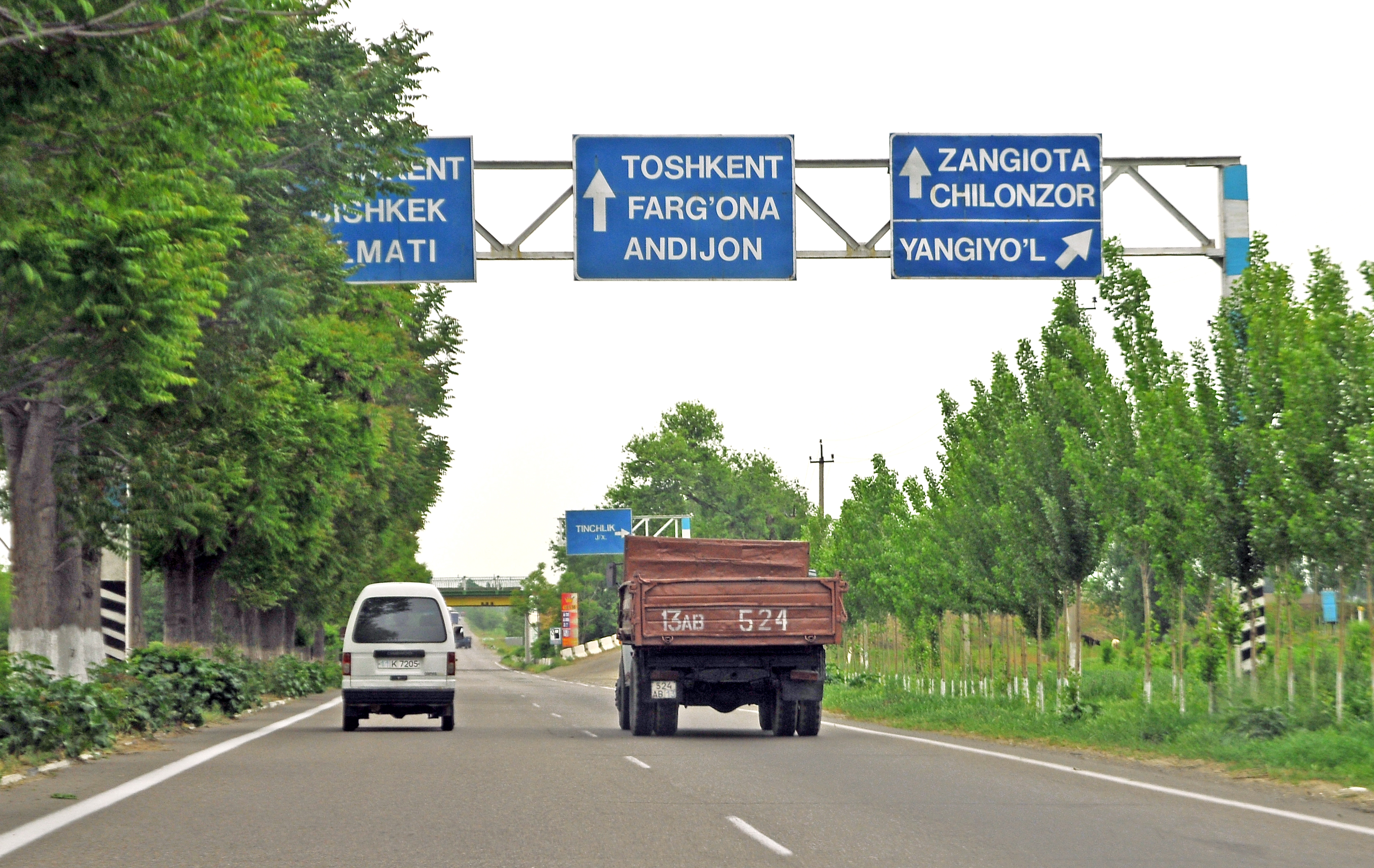
Road signs near Tashkent

The highways in Uzbekistan are divided into three groups based on the level of their significance whose names differ by a prefix on their code. On July 2024, in a cabinet ruling, the Soviet-era highway numbers were retained for "roads of international significance", but the road numbering was overhauled for "roads of state significance" and "roads of local significance".

This superseded and annulled an earlier cabinet ruling from August 2010, which affirmed and documented the same 3 levels of roadway, but retaining the codes from the Soviet era.

Below are the "highways of international significance", with a prefix "M" or "A", inheritted from the Soviet road network.

Road	Direction	Length
M34	Toshkent — Yangiyoʻl — Chinoz — Sirdaryo — Guliston — Xovos — Tajik international border ( РБ15 )	153 km
M37	Samarqand — Ishtixon — Kattaqoʻrgʻon — Karmana — Buxoro — Olot — Turkmen international border	367 km
M37a	Samarqand Ring Road	46 km
M39	Kazakh international border ( KZ13-03 ) — Gʻishtkoʻprik — Toshkent — Chinoz — Jizzax — Samarqand — Shahrisabz — Gʻuzor — Termiz	628 km
M39a	Termiz Bypass — Hayraton — Afghan international border ( NH89 )	30 km
M41	Tajik international border ( РБ02 ) — Denov — Jarqoʻrgʻon — Termiz	188 km
A373	Toshkent — Ohangaron — Angern — Qoʻqon — Shahrixon — Andijon — Kyrgyz international border ( ЭМ-15 )	379 km
A373a	Ohangaron — Guliston — Sardoba	129 km
A373b	192nd km of A373 — Qoʻqon	66 km
A376	Qoʻqon — Beshariq — Tajik international border ( РБ14 ) a break in the itinerary of this route Tajik international border ( РҶ077 ) — Bekobod — Xovos — Jizzax	153 km
A377	Samarqand — Tajik international border ( РБ13 )	37 km
A378	Samarqand — Gʻuzor	152 km
A379	Navoiy — Uchquduq	289 km
A380	Gʻuzor — Qarshi — Muborak — Buxoro — Tuproqqalʼa — Beruniy — Nukus — Xoʻjayli — Qoʻngʻirot — Kazakh international border ( KZ12-02 )	1,204 km
A381	Xoʻjayli — Turkmen international border	12 km

The total length of these roads is 3,833 km.

The next level of roadways in Uzbekistan are "roads of state significance" (davlat ahamiyatiga molik avtomobil yoʻllari), their codes consisting of 3 digints, and being designated with a prefix "D" (for davlat, meaning "state"). These roads are designated from D001 to D240, with branches and variants being labelled using minuscule latin letters, e.g. "D025e" (862nd km of M39 — Chinoz). The total length of these roads is 14,316 km.

The next level of roadways are "roads of local significance", numbered at a region (viloyat) level. For these types of roads, their codes consist of 3 digits, and they're designated with a prefix "##V" (a two digit number designating the region, same codes as those for Uzbek license plates, followed by "V" for viloyat). For example "70V001" is located in Qashqadaryo Region, and designates Qashqadaryo Ring Road. (license plates of Qashqadaryo Region have codes 70 to 74). Branches and variants are also labelled using minuscule latin letters, e.g. "70V078a" (3rd km of D148 — Shahrisabz). The total length of these roads is 24,222 km.

== Ports and waterways ==
Double landlocked Uzbekistan has no seaports. Its main river port is Termez on the Amu Darya river. Although Termez lacks modern facilities and has a shortage of spare parts, activity there has increased as conditions in neighboring Afghanistan have stabilized. Termez has been an important transfer point for humanitarian supplies entering Afghanistan.

Uzbekistan has 1,100 km (680 mi) of inland waterways. Since the mid-1990s, commercial travel on Uzbekistan's portion of the Amu Darya has been reduced because of low water levels.

== Pipelines ==
As of 2010, Uzbekistan had 10,253 km (6,371 mi) of natural gas pipelines, 868 km (539 mi) of oil pipelines, and 33 km (21 mi) of pipelines for refined products.

== Airports ==
As of 2012, Uzbekistan has 53 airports. 33 of them have paved runways, six of which had runways longer than 3,000 m (9,800 ft). The largest of them, Tashkent International Airport, is linked with European and Middle Eastern cities by direct flights of Aeroflot, Lufthansa, and Turkish Airlines. The national airline, Uzbek Havo Yollari (Uzbekistan Airlines), flies mainly within the former Soviet Union. In August 2010, Hanjin Group, the parent of Korean Airlines, opened a new cargo terminal at Navoi, which will become a cargo hub with regular Incheon-Navoi-Milan flights.

== See also ==
- North-South Transport Corridor
- Ashgabat Agreement, a Multimodal transport agreement signed by India, Oman, Iran, Turkmenistan, Uzbekistan and Kazakhstan, for creating an international transport and transit corridor facilitating transportation of goods between Central Asia and the Persian Gulf.
