= Ayimkhan Shamuratova =

- Born: Shamuratova Ayimxan Turymbetovna; 10 June 1917; Qanlykōl, Karakalpakstan
- Origin: Karakalpakstan
- Died: 29 May 1993 (aged 75)
- Genres: Mezzo-Soprano
- Occupations: Actress, singer, public figure
- Website: Official website

Ayimkhan Turymbetovna Shamuratova (Karakalpak: Айымхан Турымбет қызы Шамуратова, 1917–1993) was a Karakalpak theater actress, singer (mezzo-soprano) and public figure. She was the only Karakalpak woman to be awarded the title People's Artist of the USSR (1968).

== Early life ==
Ayimkhan Shamuratova was born on 10 June (or 5 June or 10 October) 1917 in Kanlykol (now the center of Kanlykol district in Karakalpakstan) (or Kungrad) in a poor family.

== Career ==
Starting in 1932, she performed in the troupe of Kungrad and later in Turtkul theater, where she debuted in one-act plays of the pioneers of Karakalpak theater, Abdiraman Otepov and Seyfulgabit Mazhitov.

From 1934 to 1939, 1949 to 1951, and 1955 to 1988 she was an actress at Karakalpak Theater of Musical Drama and Comedy. К. С. Stanislavsky (now named after Berdakh) in Nukus. She played more than 100 leading roles in plays of Karakalpak, Kazakh, Kyrgyz, Russian, Uzbek, Azerbaijani and other dramatists.

In 1939 she enrolled at Moscow Conservatory.

From 1939 to 1949 and 1951 to 1955, Ayimkhan was a soloist at the Karakalpak Philharmony named after Berdakh and worked at radio.

Ayimkhan also performed as a concert singer. Her repertoire included folk, ritual, folklore, lyrical and modern songs, musical arrangements of folk tunes "Bozatau", "Ariuhan", "Sorghol", "Aksungul" by her mentors bakhsy E. Kospulatov, composers A. Halimov, J. Shamuratov, A. Sultanovat and many others.

She participated in concert groups at the fronts of World War II.

Ayimkhan wrote a memoir called My Life Is Theater.

She became a member of the CPSU in 1957. She served as Deputy of the Supreme Soviet of Karakalpak ASSR of the 4th and 7th convocations.

She died on 29 May, 1993 (31 May) in Nukus.

The classic Karakalpak poet Ibrayim Yusupov dedicated to her the poem "The Fate of an Actress".

== Personal life ==
Ayimkhan married famous Karakalpak writer and translator Amet Shamuratov. They had seven children: six daughters Gulistan, Gulzhahan, Zoya, Zulfiya, Ayimgul, Ziyada and one son Berdakh. She was widowed soon.

== Recognition ==
- People's Artist of the Karakalpak ASSR (1940)
- People's Artist of the Uzbek SSR (1950)
- People's Artist of the USSR (1968)
- Two Order of the Red Banner of Labor (including 18 March 1959)
- Order of the Badge of Honor (6 December 1951)
- Order of Outstanding Merit (23 August 2004)
- medals
- Certificates of Merit of the Supreme Soviets of Uzbekistan and Karakalpakstan.
