= Qanlıkól district =

Coordinates: 42.742°N 59.163°E

Qanlıkól district Qanlıkól rayonı, Қанлыкөл районы Qonlikoʻl Tumani, Қонликўл Тумани
- District
- Qanlıkól district
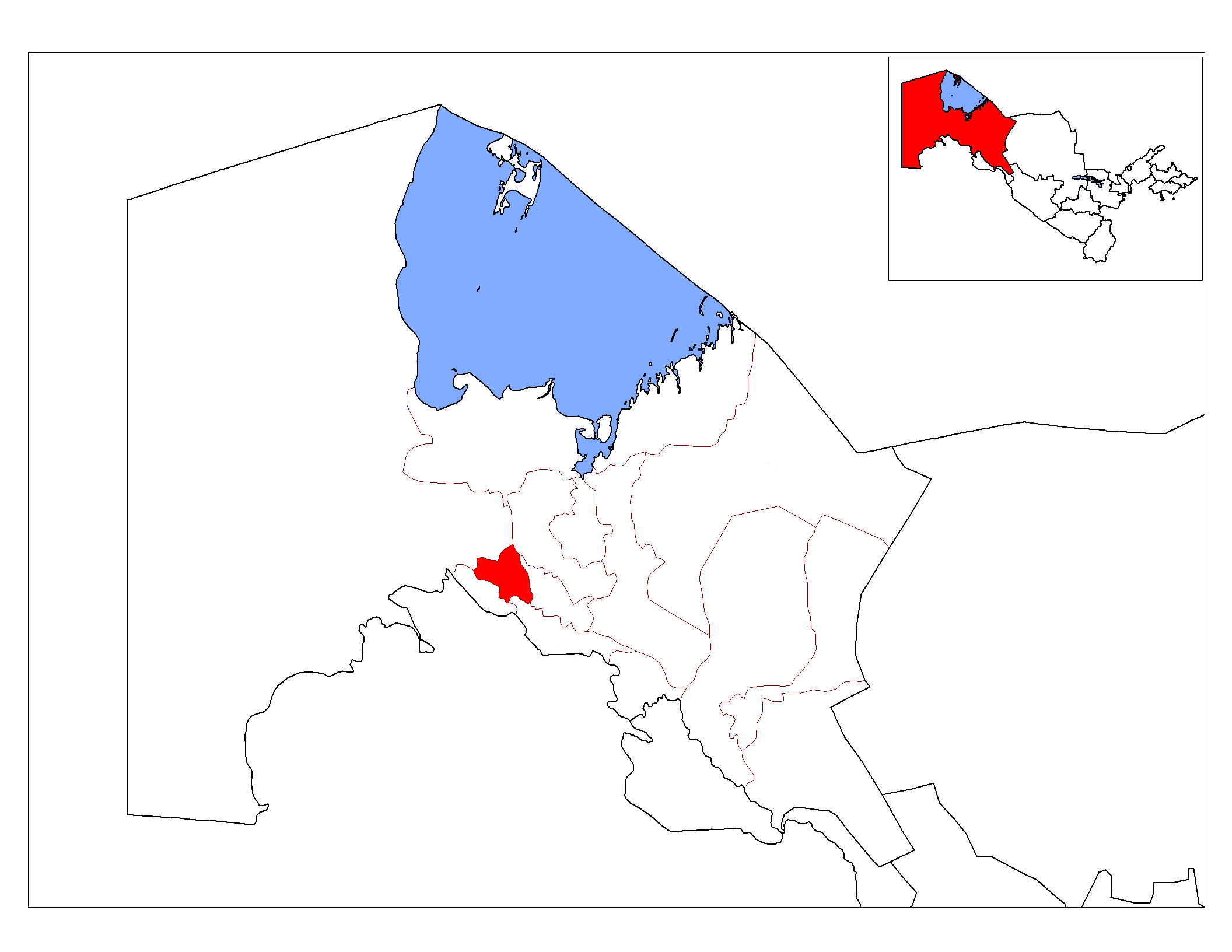
- Country: Uzbekistan
- Autonomous Republic: Karakalpakstan
- Capital: Qanlıkól
- Established: 1970

Area
  - Total: 740 km^{2} (290 sq mi)
- Elevation: 63 m (207 ft)

Population (2022)
  - Total: 52,400
  - Density: 71/km^{2} (180/sq mi)
- Time zone: UTC+5 (UZT)

Qanlıkól district (Karakalpak: Qanlıkól rayonı)(Uzbek: Qanlikoʻl Tumani) is a district in the Republic of Karakalpakstan. The seat lies at the urban-type settlement Qanlıkól. Its area is 740 km^{2} (290 sq mi) and it had 52,400 inhabitants in 2022.

The district consists of one town Qanlıkól and seven rural councils Arzimbet qum, Beskópir, Jańa qala, Bostan, Kosjap, Nawriz, Qanlıkól.
