= Vera Mireeva =

Soviet philologist (1931–2004)

Vera Arsenivna Mireeva (22 August 1931 - 6 July 2004) was a philologist, turkologist, and Russian scholar, teacher, and methodologist of the Russian language, poet and prose writer, journalist. She gave 45 years for enlightenment and russification of the Turkic peoples of Central Asia, Honorary student of education of the USSR and an excellent student of national education of the Uzbek SSR.

== Early life and education ==
Mireeva's father Arseniy Pavlovich Mykhaylov was a military officer. Mother - Vera Vladimirovna Mykhaylova (née Karasyova) was a housewife. In 1935, her parents divorced, and later Vera lived in her mother's new family with her stepfather Fyodor Yukhimovych Anufriev and two sisters. She managed to meet her father only after 20 years. Mireeva went to primary school in her hometown in 1939, but her studies were interrupted by the war and the fierce battles for Kalinin in the winter of 1941–1942.

Since 1943, she lived in Ukraine. She graduated from high school in Yavoriv (Lviv region).

In 1949, Mireeva entered the Ivan Franko Lviv State University, and in 1954 she completed the full course of this university, majoring in Russian language and literature, and received diploma according to which the decision of the State Examination Commission of June 28, 1954, awarded her the qualification of a philologist.

== Career ==
According to the distribution, Mireeva was sent to the city of Nukus (Karakalpakia, Uzbekistan). In 1954–1967, Mireeva worked as a teacher, and then as a senior lecturer at the Department of Russian Linguistics of the Karakalpak State Pedagogical Institute, in 1967-1989 as a senior researcher, then as the head of the Russian language teaching methodology sector at the Karakalpak branch of the Uzbek Research Institute of Pedagogical Sciences named after T. N. Kary-Niyazova. During this time, she trained thousands of teachers of the Russian language, wrote dozens of textbooks and methodical guides, and about one and a half hundred scientific articles.

In 1989, Mireeva retired, and in 1998 she returned to Ukraine, to Crimea. Over the years, Mireeva's literary gift revealed. She wrote dozens of stories, poems, essays, and essays in Russian and Ukrainian, most of which were published in periodicals in Ukraine, Uzbekistan, and Russia. Her poetry and prose are diverse, distinguished by deep lyricism, a philosophical component, optimism, and sincere love for life, people, and nature. Many of her works are biographical in nature. The central place in them is occupied by memories of the horrors of war, which she had to witness in her childhood. They depict the savagery of the German invaders and the nobility of the Soviet soldiers.

== Awards and honors ==
- The "Veteran of Labor" medal is awarded for years of conscientious work on behalf of the Presidium of the Supreme Soviet of the USSR and by the Decree of the Presidium of the Supreme Soviet of the Karakalpak ASSR dated July 24, 1985.
- Badge "Excellent in Education of the USSR" - awarded for the great success achieved in the field of public education and active participation in social and political life by a joint decision of the Minister of Education of the USSR and the Chairman of the Central Committee of the Trade Union of Education, Higher Education and Scientific Institutions No. 63-16z dated March 20, 1987
- Badge "Excellent of public education of the Uzbek SSR" - awarded by the decision of the Minister of Education of the Uzbek SSR No. 16/10 dated August 24, 1984.

== Selected books ==
- V. A. Mireeva. Method of working with a tape recorder in Russian language lessons at a Karakalpak school = Method of working with a tape recorder in Russian language lessons at a Karakalpak school. - Nukus: Karakalpakstan, 1981. — 50 p.
- V.A. Mireeva. We study the Russian language. Guide for optional Russian language classes in grades 7-8 of the Karakalpak school [methodical guide for teachers] = Изучаем русский язык. Manual for optional classes in Russian in the 7th-8th grades of the Karakalpak school [Methodical manual for teachers]. - Nukus: Karakalpakstan, 1983. — 74 p.
- V. A. Mireeva. Learning Russian pronunciation in the Karakalpak school = Learning Russian pronunciation in the Karakalpak school. - Nukus: Karakalpakstan, 1988. — 92 p.
