= Erkin Qaraqalpaqstan =

Еркин Қарақалпақстан
- Type: general broadsheet
- Founded: 1924
- Language: Karakalpak
- Headquarters: Karakalpakstan st., 9 Nukus
- Circulation: c. 2700

Erkin Qaraqalpaqstan (Karakalpak: Еркин Қарақалпақстан, Free Karakalpakstan) is a major Karakalpak language newspaper and online news outlet, published in Uzbekistan. As of 2007, it printed 2700 copies three times a week, down from 66,000 five times a week in 1975.

Former names:

- 1924: ٴىيركىن قاراغالفاق (Erkin qaraqalpaq, Free Karakalpak)
- 1929: مينەتكەش قاراقالپاق (Miynetkesh qaraqalpaq, Working Karapalpak)
- 1932: Qьzьl Qaraqalpaƣьstan (Qızıl Qaraqalpaqstan, Red Karakalpakstan)
- 1950: Совет Қарақалпақстаны (Soviet Karakalpakstan)
- 1990: Еркин Қарақалпақстан (Free Karakalpakstan)
