= Tokmak (disambiguation) =

Tokmak is a city in Zaporizhzhia Oblast, Ukraine.

Tokmak may also refer to one of the following:

- Tokmak Raion, a former raion in Zaporizhzhia Oblast, Ukraine
- Tokmak urban hromada, a hromada of Ukraine
- Tokmak, Uzbekistan, a city in Uzbekistan
- Tokmok, a city in Kyrgyzstan, often also spelt Tokmak
- Molochna, a river in Ukraine known as Tokmak by the Nogais people
- Seher Tokmak (born 1999), Turkish female sports shooter

== See also ==
- Tokamak (disambiguation)
