= Nukus =

Capital of Karakalpakstan, Uzbekistan

Nukus: Nókis / Нөкис (Karakalpak); Nukus / Нукус (Uzbek)
- District-level city
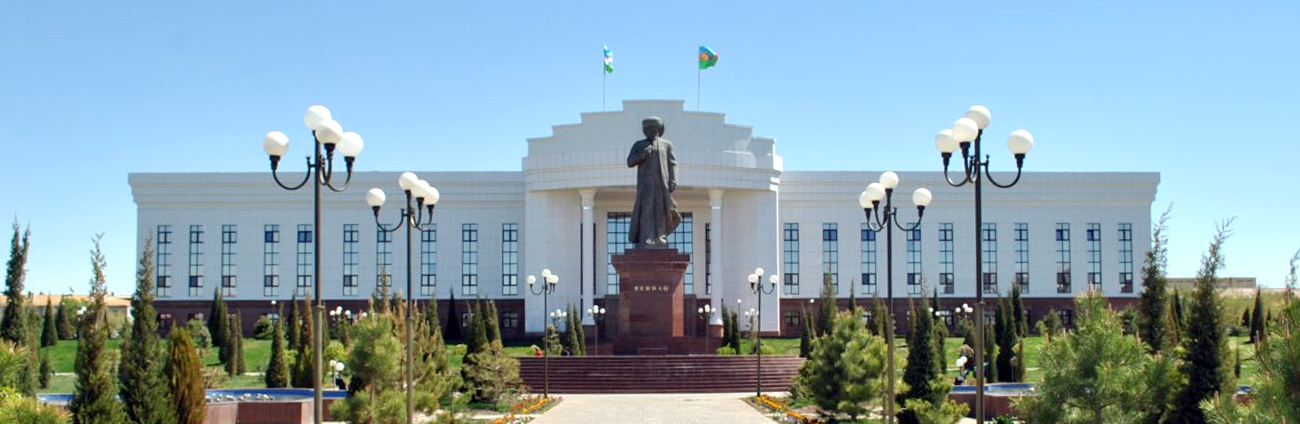
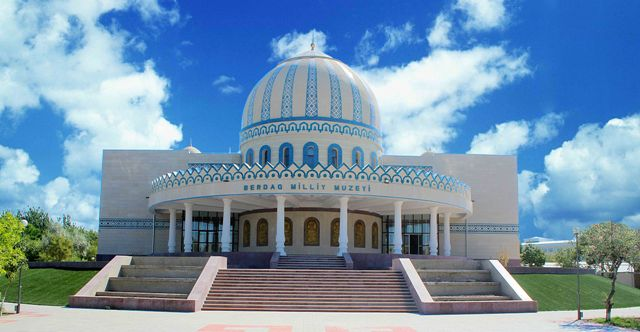
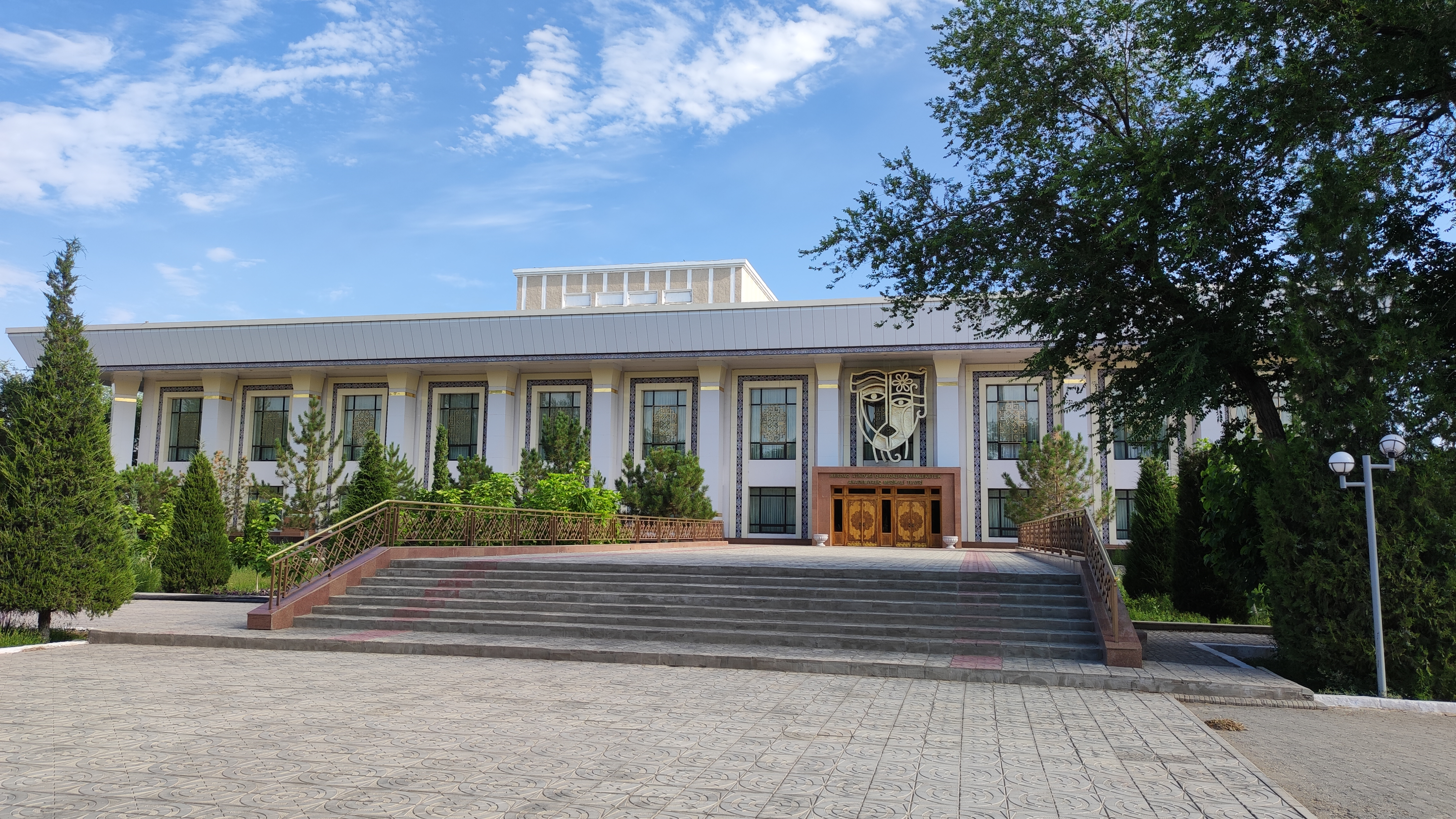
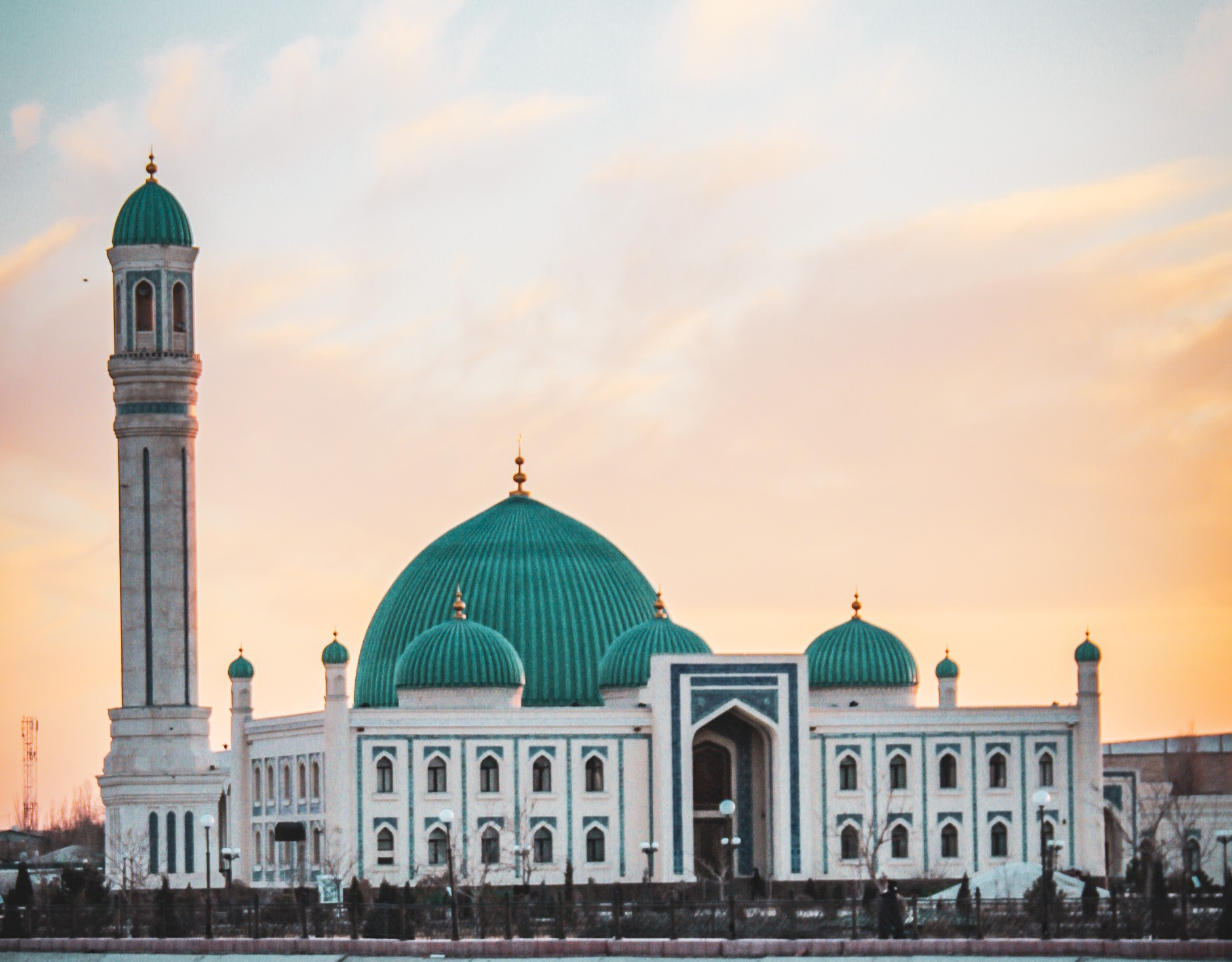
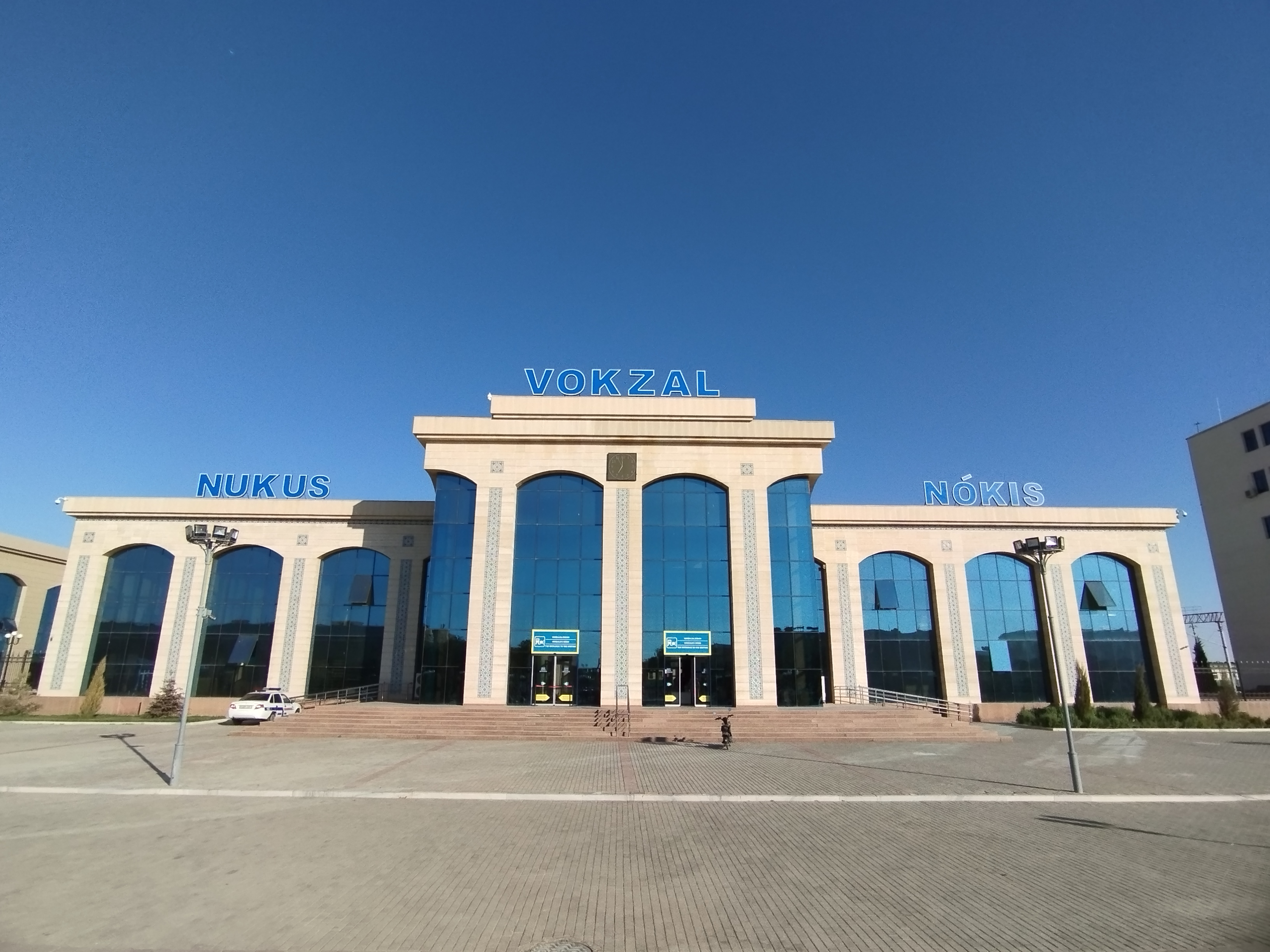
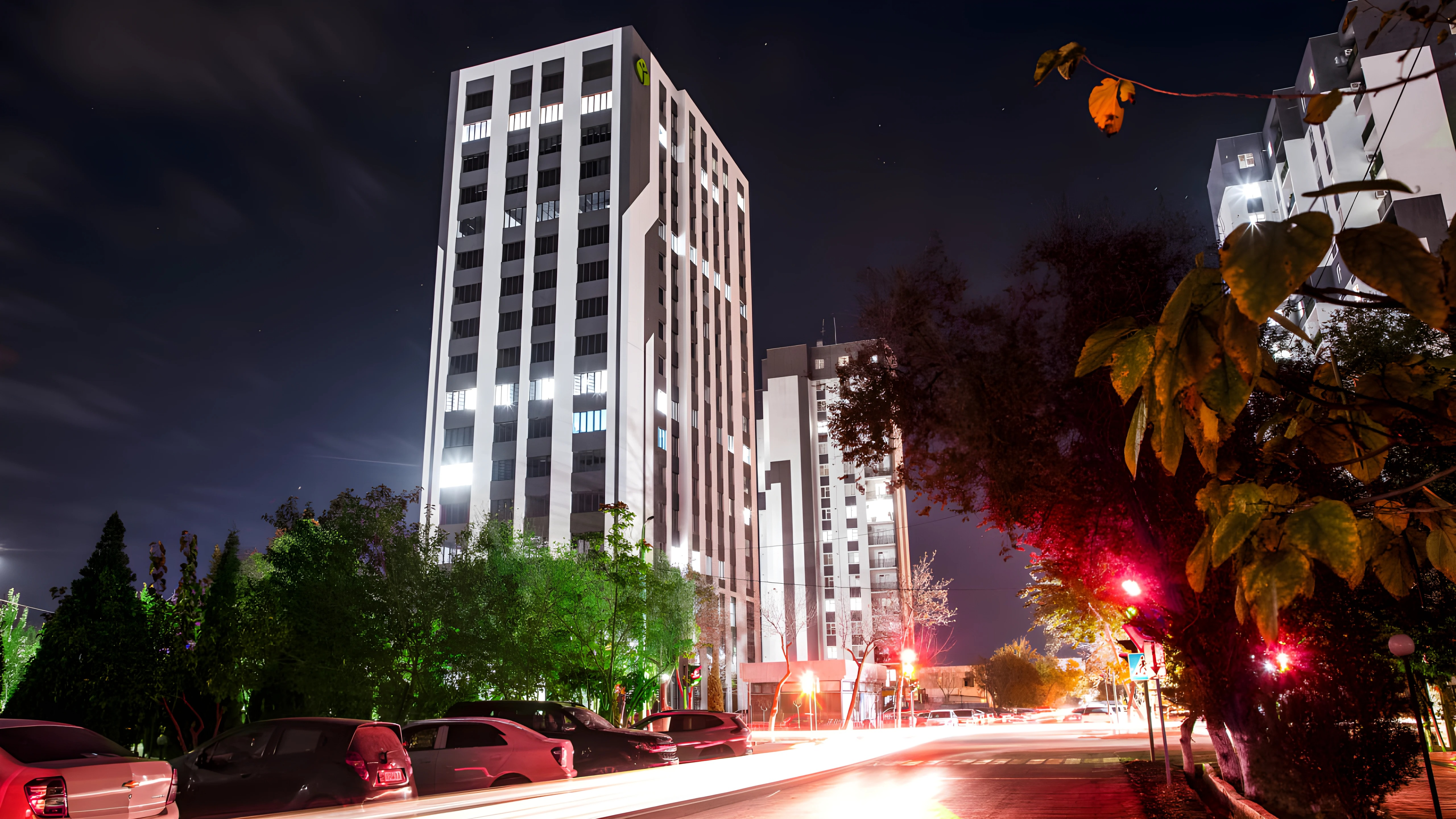
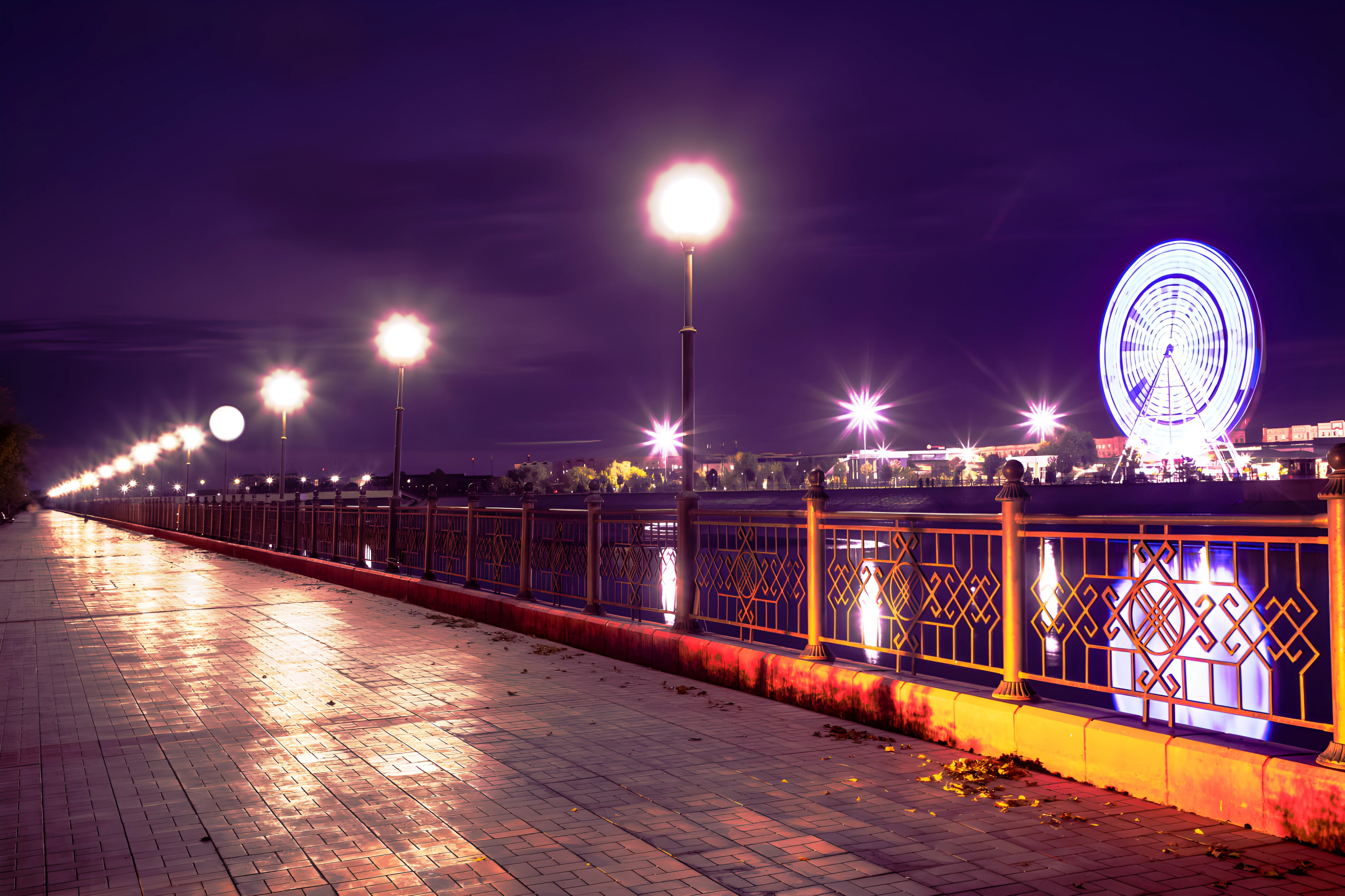
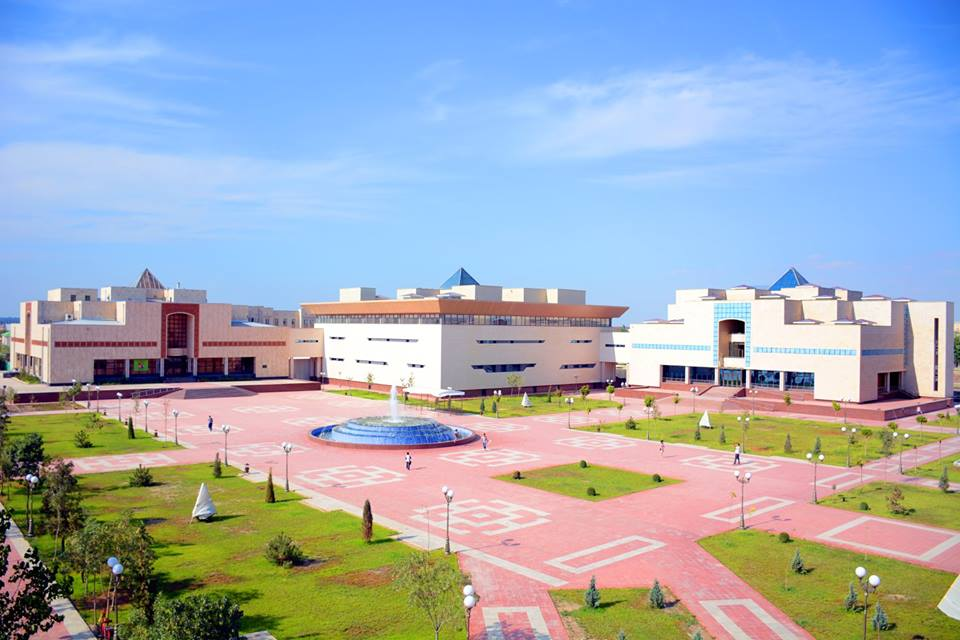
- Ájiniyaz Monument and Joqarǵı Keńes Parliament Building Berdakh National Museum Karakalpak State Musical Theater Mosque of Imam Ishan Muhammad Nukus Railway Station IT Park Towers Qizketgan Channel Aerial view of Nukus City Square and the Savitsky State Museum of Art

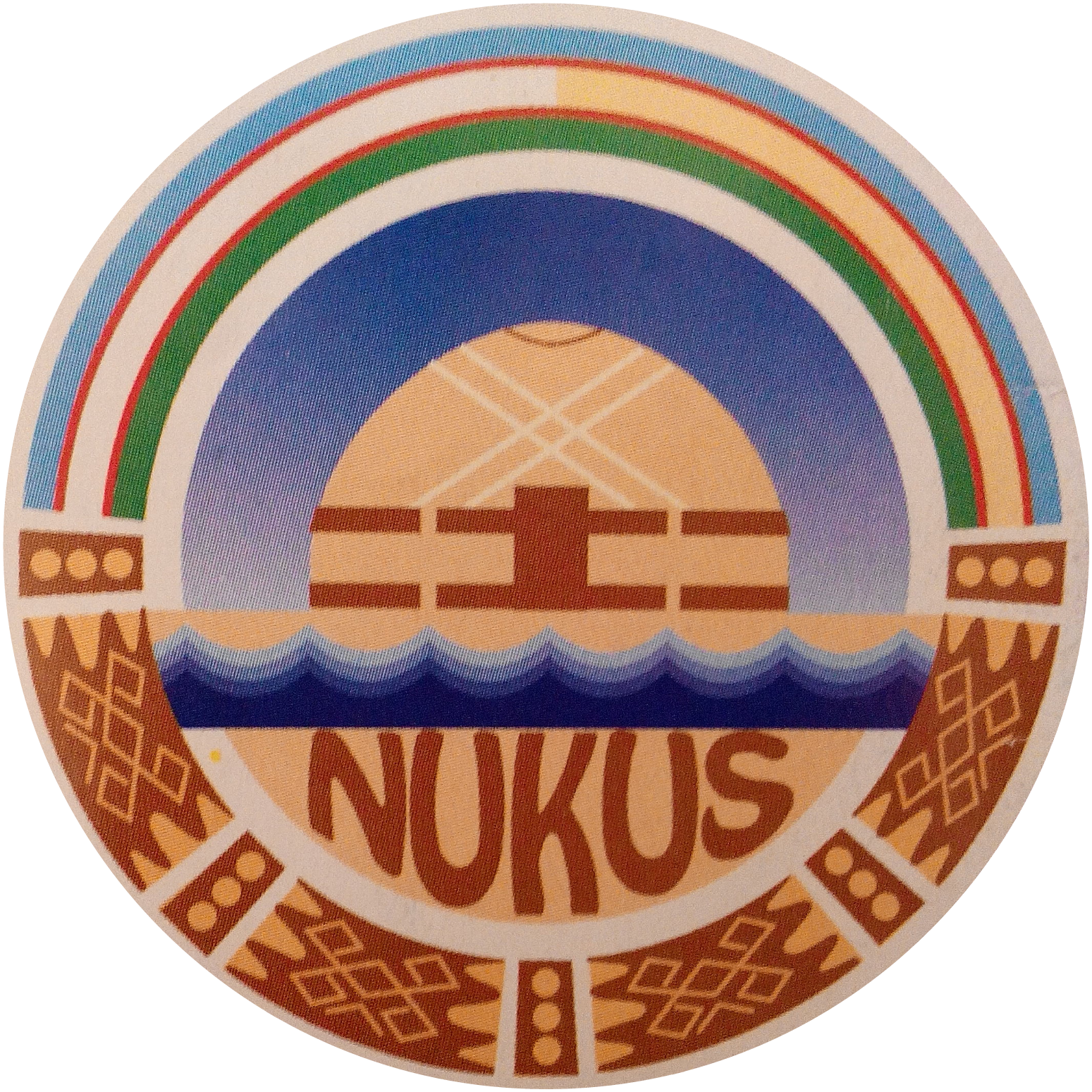
- Seal

- Location in Karakalpakstan Nukus (Uzbekistan) Nukus (West and Central Asia)
- Coordinates: 42°28′N 59°36′E
- Country: Uzbekistan
- Sovereign Republic: Karakalpakstan
- Established: 1860

Government
  - Type: City Administration
  - Hokim (Mayor): Abatbay Daniyarov

Area
  - Total: 222 km^{2} (86 sq mi)
- Elevation: 76 m (249 ft)

Population (2026)
  - Total: 349,400
  - Density: 1,570/km^{2} (4,080/sq mi)
- Demonym(s): Nókisli (Karakalpak); Nukuslik (Uzbek); Nukusian
- Time zone: UTC+05:00 (UZT)
  - Summer (DST): UZT
- Postal code: 2301xx
- Area code: (+998) 61
- HDI (2024): 0.745 · 3rd high
- Website: gov.uz/nokis

Nukus (Karakalpak: Nókis, Нөкис; Uzbek: Nukus, Нукус) is the capital and largest city of the autonomous Republic of Karakalpakstan and the sixth-largest city in Uzbekistan. In 2026, the population of Nukus was 349,400 people. The Amu Darya river passes west of the city. Administratively, Nukus is a district-level city, that includes the urban-type settlement Karatau.

Nukus is the center of Karakalpakstan's economy, government, politics and culture. The city is best known for its Nukus Museum of Art.

== Etymology ==
The name "Nukus" comes from the tribal name of the Karakalpaks, lit. 'New Kath', in Persian: نوکاث, Nūkās. "Kus", the root of the city's name, derives from Kath, the name of the past capital of Khwarazm, now named Beruniy.

== History ==
Nukus, in its modern location, started as a fortress that was built in the 17th century. Slowly growing within the Khivan Khanate, and later the Russian Empire, it was a mid-sized city, before the Soviet era.

When the Karakalpak Autonomous Oblast was established, Toʻrtkoʻl became its administrative center. However, in the 1920s, Toʻrtkoʻl was under the threat of the flooding of the Amu Darya river, the banks of which were about 12 km from the city. This caused most of the institutions of Karakalpakstan to move towards Nukus, and in 1932 the city was officially founded, eventually receiving capital status. After further development and industrialization, it became a city with broad avenues and big public buildings by the 1950s.

The city's isolation made it host to the Red Army's Chemical Research Institute, a major research and testing center for chemical weapons. In 2002 the United States Department of Defense dismantled the Chemical Research Institute, a major research and testing site for the Novichok agent, under a $6 million Cooperative Threat Reduction program.

== Sights ==
Nukus is host to the Nukus Museum of Art (also known as the State Art Museum of the Republic of Karakalpakstan, named after Igor Savitsky) and State Museum. The State Museum houses the usual collection of artifacts recovered from archaeological investigations, traditional jewelry, costumes and musical instruments, displays of the area's now vanished or endangered flora and fauna, and on the Aral Sea issue. The Art Museum is noted for its collection of modern Russian and Uzbek art from 1918 to 1935. Both Savitsky himself and the collection at Nukus survived because the city's remoteness limited the influence and reach of Soviet authorities. The documentary film The Desert of Forbidden Art is all about the collection and its history.

Nukus is also home to the Amet and Ayimkhan Shamuratovs house museum, a center for Karakalpak music and oral culture. The museum's collection represents personal belongings of the Shamuratovs including stage clothes, photographs, manuscripts, books, letters.

== Climate ==
Nukus experiences a cold desert climate (Köppen BWk, Trewartha BWho) with summers that are long, dry and very hot, and winters that are short, though quite cold and snowy, having a very dry type of a continental climate. Because the Aral Sea and Amu Darya have dried up, the climate has become much hotter and drier since 1960, and health conditions resulting from salt and other chemicals in the air have become more common.

Climate data for Nukus (1991–2020)
Month	Jan	Feb	Mar	Apr	May	Jun	Jul	Aug	Sep	Oct	Nov	Dec	Year
Mean daily maximum °C (°F)	0.9 (33.6)	4.2 (39.6)	13.0 (55.4)	22.0 (71.6)	29.5 (85.1)	34.8 (94.6)	36.4 (97.5)	34.6 (94.3)	28.0 (82.4)	19.8 (67.6)	9.6 (49.3)	2.7 (36.9)	19.6 (67.3)
Daily mean °C (°F)	−3.7 (25.3)	−1.4 (29.5)	6.4 (43.5)	15.1 (59.2)	22.3 (72.1)	27.7 (81.9)	29.4 (84.9)	27.1 (80.8)	20.1 (68.2)	12.0 (53.6)	3.6 (38.5)	−2.0 (28.4)	13.1 (55.6)
Mean daily minimum °C (°F)	−7.5 (18.5)	−6.0 (21.2)	0.8 (33.4)	8.6 (47.5)	14.8 (58.6)	19.5 (67.1)	21.4 (70.5)	19.0 (66.2)	12.3 (54.1)	5.1 (41.2)	−1.4 (29.5)	−6.0 (21.2)	6.7 (44.1)
Average precipitation mm (inches)	9.6 (0.38)	9.2 (0.36)	16.3 (0.64)	16.6 (0.65)	11.5 (0.45)	3.4 (0.13)	2.5 (0.10)	1.7 (0.07)	2.8 (0.11)	7.1 (0.28)	12.8 (0.50)	10.6 (0.42)	104.1 (4.10)
Average precipitation days (≥ 1.0 mm)	11	9	9	8	8	5	3	2	3	5	8	10	81
Source: NOAA

== Population ==
Year	1933	1939	1959	1974	1987	1989	1991	1998	1999	2006	2010	2014	2016	2017	2018	2019	2020	2021	2023
Population, thousand people	11	10	39	88	152	170,3	180	197	199	257,8	271,4	295,2	303,8	309,9	312,1	316,3	319,8	325,1	335,4

== Attractions ==
The I. V. Savitsky State Museum of Art. The I.V.Savitsky State Museum of Art is located in Nukus, which is the best art collection in the Asian region, having the second largest and largest collection of Russian avant-garde works. The English newspaper The Guardian called the museum "one of the most beautiful museums in the world" (Amelia Gentleman "Savitsky's secret Hoard". The Guardian, January 1, 2001). The collection of the Nukus Museum is said to "shed light on the history of Russian art" and "gives a true picture of the artistic life of 1920–1930" (Prof. Hansen-Levet, J.K.Marcade).

The I.V.Savitsky State Museum of Arts of the Republic of Karakalpakstan traces the cultural segment from the III century BC to the present. There are objects of the material and artistic culture of ancient Khorezm, folk and applied art of the Karakalpaks, a small semi-nomadic ethnic group living in the north—west of Uzbekistan and having an ancient history and original culture. The department of fine arts focuses not only the national art school of Karakalpakstan, but also the works of the founders of the picturesque culture of Uzbekistan — a multinational team of artists who worked in Central Asia at the beginning of the 20th century.

The Museum of Local Lore of Karakalpakstan

The Museum of Local Lore of Karakalpakstan, located in the city of Nukus, is one of the oldest museums in Central Asia, with a history spanning approximately 80 years.

As of today, the museum houses a collection of over 56,000 artifacts, including a taxidermy specimen of the extinct Turanian tiger. The holdings continue to expand through ongoing archaeological excavations and academic partnerships with universities and research institutions.

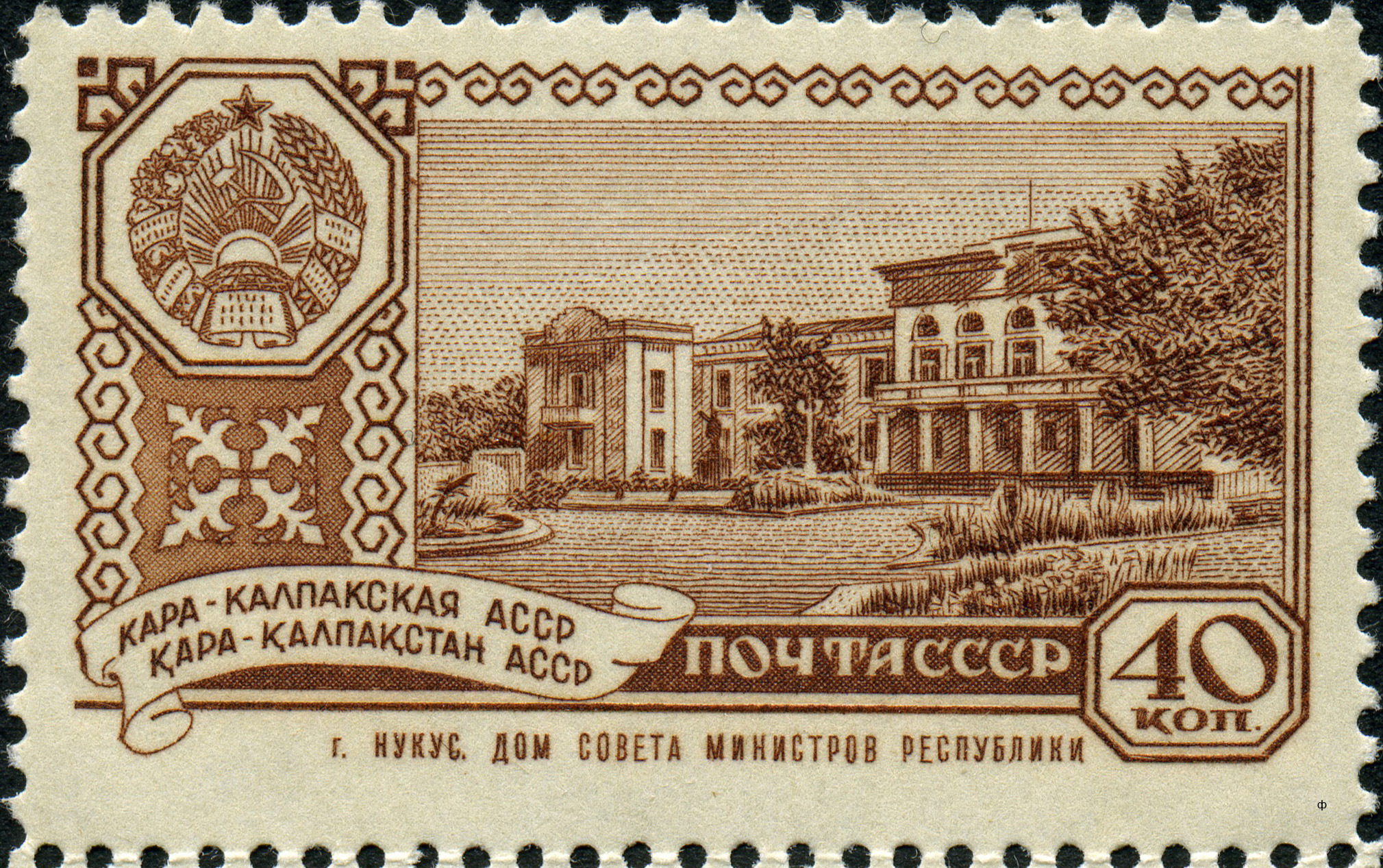
Postage stamp of the USSR 1960 Nukus. The House of the Council of Ministers of the Republic.

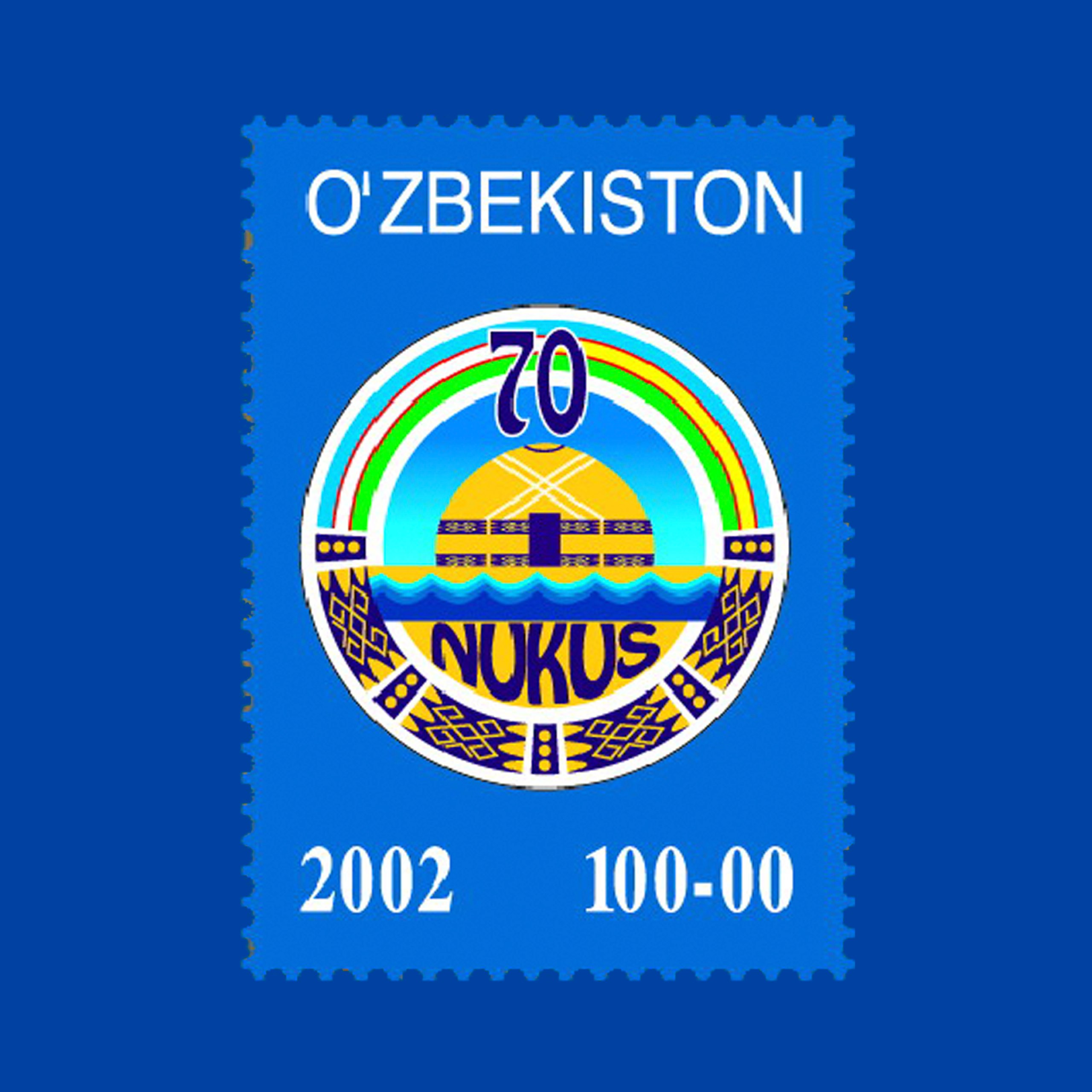
Postage stamp of Uzbekistan 2002.

In total, the museum has 21 halls, all of them are divided into themes: nature, archeology, ethnography and modern history of the region. Nature halls are very interesting, which are especially popular with children and give an idea of the flora and fauna of the republic. The Department of Archaeology contains models of ancient settlements and objects found at excavations. An interesting exposition of folk craftsmen, with embroideries, woven carpets, jewelry and musical instruments. The traditional dwelling of the local population, the Karakalpak yurt, is also represented here.

Karakalpak State Museum named after Berdakh

In 1997, in connection with the 170th anniversary of the great Karakalpak poet-thinker Berdakh, it was decided to create a museum named after him. The museum building was built in 1998 next to the Karakalpak State University.

The total area of the museum is 1.26 thousand m2. It is a three-storey building with one large and six small domes. The author is a well-known architect in the republic, winner of the Berdakh State Prize Orynbai Toreniyazov.

The museum is a treasure trove of the cultural heritage of the people, a mirror of history, which reflects the entire historical path traversed by the people from ancient times to the present day. The Berdakh Museum, justifying its vocation, decorates the city with its original architecture.

Studying the poet's work, Berdakh can be called the first historian of the Karakalpak people. His work "Shezhire" ("Genealogy") is truly a genealogy of an entire people (not only the Karakalpaks), as it contains information about the Turkic peoples as a whole. The poem contains the names of about 300 characters, historical figures who have made a significant contribution to the history of the people. Berdakh has poems dedicated to national heroes, such as "Amangeldi", "Ernazar Biy" and others; the images of these heroes are still preserved in the national memory.

In addition to his poetic gift, Berdakh also possessed the talent of bakhsa (a kind of musical art). He was famous for this not only among the Karakalpaks, but also among neighboring peoples: Uzbeks of Khorezm and Turkmens.

Taking into account the breadth of the poet's interests and the versatility of his work, the museum has expositions reflecting the history, ethnography and culture of the Karakalpaks. Of particular interest is the hall of ancient manuscripts, where written monuments in Arabic, Persian and Turkic languages are preserved to this day. It is also planned to organize special thematic halls of archeology, art and history.

It is planned that in the future the museum will become a center for the restoration, conservation and study of written monuments in Karakalpakstan and thereby assume a scientific and educational function.

The expositions also provide knowledge about the history of education and upbringing in Karakalpakstan, about spiritual educational institutions of the past and present (madrassas and mektebahs), about the first Soviet educational institutions, about the history of the formation of higher and secondary education in Karakalpakstan.

The Karakalpak State Musical Theatre named after Berdakh (formerly named after Stanislavsky) is located in Nukus.

There are monuments to Berdakh, Ulugbek, Azhiniyaz and others in the city.

There are archaeological sites in the vicinity of the city: Shylpyk — the Zoroastrian dakhma — and the necropolis of ancient Mizdakhkan.

Shylpyk

The ring-shaped structure of Shylpyk is located on the highway 43 km from Nukus in the direction to the south (to Khiva, Samarkand, Tashkent), on top of a conical hill with a height of 35–40 m.

In plan, it has the shape of an open, slightly flattened circle with a diameter of 65–79 m. The walls reach a height of 15 m.

Shylpyk was erected in the II—IV centuries as a Zoroastrian dakhma. In the IX—XI centuries, it was used by local residents of the district as a signal tower.

Tok-kala (Darsan)

The settlement of Tok-kala (Darsan) is located 14 km west of Nukus, on a small natural hill of Toktau. The total area is 8 hectares. The monument consists of three parts — antique, early medieval and burial ground.

The most recent study was conducted in 1998 during the educational field archaeological practice of the Department of History of the NGPI named after Azhiniyaza. The topography of the settlement was studied, and an 18 m2 room was excavated in the early medieval part. A human burial was opened, and bones were found inside a small ceramic molded vessel of the humcha type. It was covered with a brick, possibly taken from the ancient wall of the settlement.

== Science and education, medicine, culture and sports ==
The city is home to the Karakalpak branch of the Academy of Sciences of the Republic of Uzbekistan, several research institutes (including the Institute of History, Archeology and Ethnography, a branch of the Uzbek Scientific Research Institute of Pedagogical Sciences named after T. N. Kara-Niyazov (UzNIIPN), Karakalpak State University, Nukus State Pedagogical Institute named after Azhiniyaz, Karakalpak medical institute, branch of the Tashkent State Agrarian University, Karalpak state Technologies university, Nukus branch of the Institute of Sports and Culture of the Republic of Uzbekistan, Nukus branch of the Tashkent State Dental Institute), 51 secondary schools, colleges, academic lyceums, 5 boarding schools, 52 preschool institutions and 2 libraries. There are 9 family clinics.

There are the Berdakh Karakalpak State Museum, Karakalpak Art museum named Savitskiy, the Berdakh Drama Theater, the Karakalpak State Puppet Theater, and the Karakalpak State Theater for Young Spectators.

There are about 200 sports halls and playgrounds in the city, including the Turan city stadium, a racetrack, a swimming pool, a rowing school, etc.

=== Football ===
Aral is a local football club whose home arena is Turan Stadium.

== Economy ==
In 2019, the Nukus free economic zone (FEZ) was established to "attract direct foreign and domestic investments for the production of import-substituting products that are in demand on foreign markets". This FEZ will be in place for 30 years.

== Transport ==
=== Air ===
Nukus Airport is Karakalpakstan's busiest, and only international airport. It lies 2.5 kilometers (1.5 mi) from the city center, and has regular planes to Tashkent, Moynaq, Moscow, and Istanbul.

=== Buses ===
A city bus service in Nukus was established in 2020, and significantly expanded in 2026, however marshrutkas still dominate travel within the city. Nukus is set to receive 100, through a contract with a Chinese manufacturer.

== Politics ==
Nukus is the capital of the sovereign Republic of Karakalpakstan within Uzbekistan. There has been concern raised over a lack of due process in legal trials in the city. In July 2022, thousands of people protested in the city over a proposed constitutional amendment that would make Karakalpakstan no longer autonomous. 19 people were killed by security forces.

== Notable people ==
- Salijon Abdurahmanov (born 1950) journalist and former prisoner of conscience.
- Dauletmurat Tazhimuratov (born c. 1979) – lawyer, journalist and human rights activist

== See also ==
- Nukus Museum of Art
- Nukus Airport
- Karakalpak Autonomous Soviet Socialist Republic
- Russian irredentism
- Andijan massacre
- Separatism in Russia
- Separatism in Uzbekistan
- Separatism in Kazakhstan
- Fauziya Bayramova
- Russia–Uzbekistan relations
- Kazakh–Russian ethnic conflicts
- Ethnic conflicts in Kazakhstan
- 2010 South Kyrgyzstan ethnic clashes
- 2020 Dungan–Kazakh ethnic clashes
- 2022 Karakalpak protests
- Kazakh invasion of Northern Bukhara
- Kazakh War of Independence
