= Qanlıkól =

Qanlıkól Qanlıkól, Қанлыкөл Qanlikoʻl, Қанликўл
- 'Town'
- Qanlıkól qalashası Qanlikoʻl shahrchasi
- Location in Uzbekistan
- Coordinates: 42°50′N 59°00′E
- Country: Uzbekistan
- Autonomous Republic: Karakalpakstan
- District: Qanlıkól district

Population (2006)
  - Total: 10,303
- Time zone: UTC+5 (UZT)

Qanlıkól (Karakalpak: Qanlıkól, Қанлыкөл; Uzbek: Qanlikoʻl, Қанликўл, قانلی‌کۉل) is a town and seat of Qanlıkól district in Karakalpakstan. The town population in 1989 was 7,303 people.

The name of this town, in both Karakalpak and Uzbek, means "blook-like lake". In the Soviet times, the name of this town was Leninabad (Karakalpak: Ленинабад; Uzbek: Leninobod, Ленинобод, لنین‌آباد).

The famous Karakalpak musical artist and singer Ayimkhan Shamuratova was born in Qanlıkól.
