= Ájiniyaz =

Karakalpak poet

- Ájiniyaz Qosıbay ulı
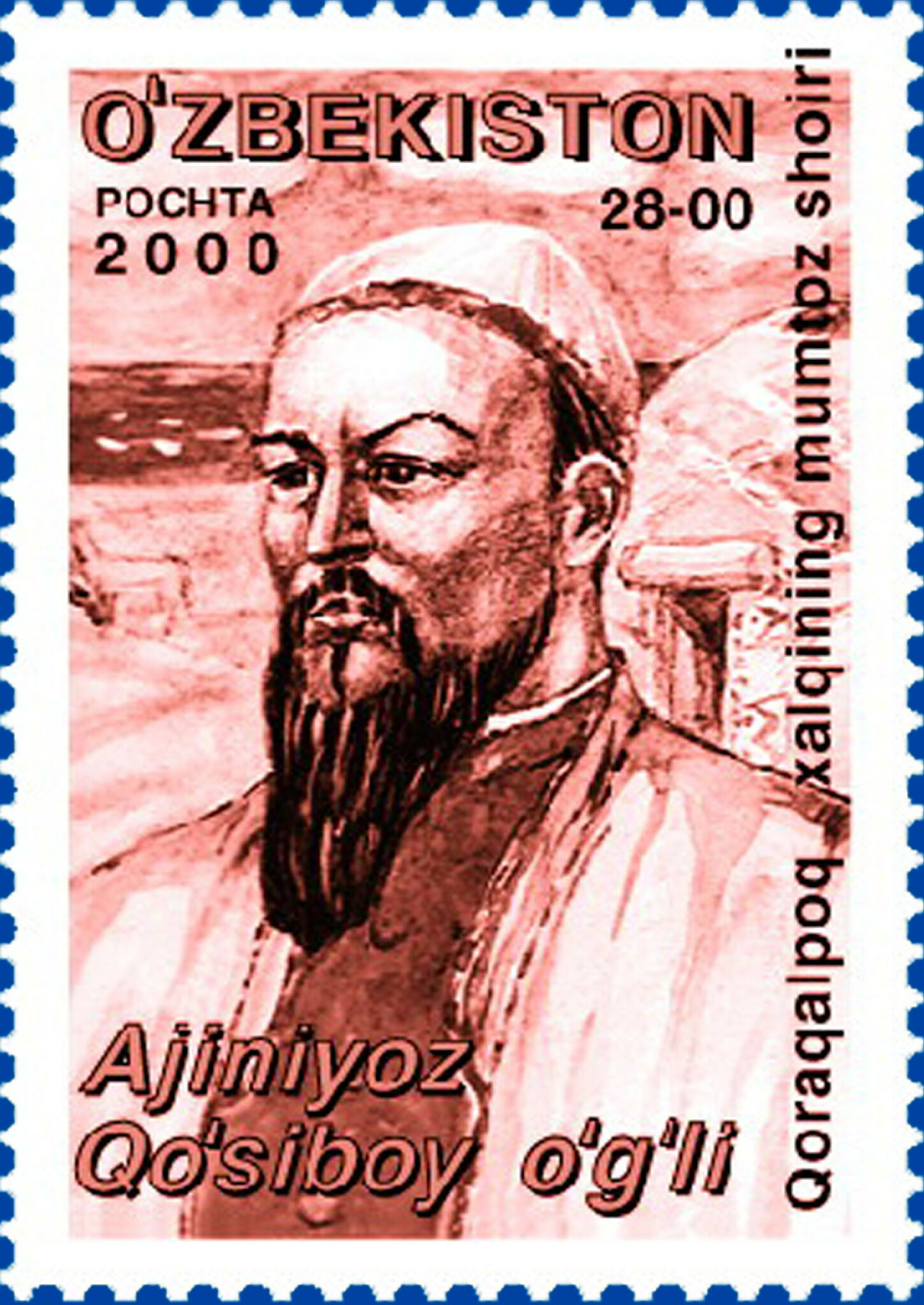
- On 2000 Uzbekistan stamp
- Born: 1824; Khanate of Khiva
- Died: 1878 (aged 53–54)
- Writing career
- Pen name: Ziywar
- Notable work: Bozataw

Azhiniyaz Qosybay Uly (Karakalpak: Әжинияз Қосыбай улы, 1824–1878) was a Karakalpak poet, who is also known by his pen name Ziywar.

== Origins ==
Ajiniyaz was born in 1824 at the southern coast of the Aral Sea, in the village of Qamısh buǵat of the Muynak district, at the mouth of the river Amu Darya, where the Karakalpak tribes (ruw) as ashamayli and kiyat used to live. The area was at the time part of the Khanate of Khiva. Ajiniyaz's father was named Qosıbay, and he had two brothers - Baltabek and Aqzhigit. His mother was named Nazira.

== Education ==
Since his childhood, Ajiniyaz had been interested in academia. He first attended the madrasa of Xozhamurat-imam, then, after his mother's death, took classes from his uncle Elmurat. Apart from attending classes, the future poet was engaged in rewriting books, which made him well-known. By the age of 16 he had rewritten some poems by Alisher Navoi. Ajiniyaz continued his education in Khiva. In the cultural center of ancient Khorezm he attended first the madrasa of Sher-Gozi where the classic Turkmen poet Maktumkuli had studied before, and then joined the madrasa of Kutlimurat-Inak. Today, at the entrance of this madrasa, one can see written: "Here in 1840–1845 a poet Ájiniyaz Qosıbay Ulı used to study". In addition to spiritual disciplines, Ajiniyaz studied the poetry of Oriental classical poets such as Navoi, Khafiz, Saadi, and Fizuli in the madrasa of Kutlimurat-Inak, which greatly influenced his progressive lyric poetry.

After graduation from the madrasa of Kutlimurat-Inak, Ajiniyaz returned to his native village but soon left again for Kazakhstan, where he remained for a year. Upon his return, he married a girl named Khamra from the tribe of Ashamayli, who bore two sons and a daughter for him. His descendants presently live in the Kungrad, Qanlikōl, and Shomanay regions, and in the city of Nukus.

== The Kungrad rebellion ==
The Kungrad rebellion of 1858−1859, one of the important events in the history of the people inhabiting the Khorezm oasis, had a large influence on Ajiniyaz's poetry. Ajiniyaz chose to take part in the rebellion. He was subsequently deported to Turkmenistan by the authorities of Khiva as one of the leaders of the rebellion. During the deportation period the poet translated many poems by Maktumkuli into the Karakalpak language.

== Life in Kazakhstan ==
Three years later, Ajiniyaz came back home, where he was persecuted. Under these circumstances he left for Kazakhstan. In 1864, during his trip to Kazakhstan, he took part in aytis, a lyrical competition with a Kazakh poet called Kyz-Menesh. Compared with other contemporary folk genres of the region, aytis was particularly popular. In 1878, it was described in the Tashkent newspaper Turkistan walayati. According to the contents of one of Ajiniyaz's poems, he was 40 years old at that time:

... When there is wedding, you’ll wear red chapan,
And burn from love in the fire of your beloved.
I was born in a year of a sheep, now I am 40, Kiz-menesh,
Will you marry me, clarifying the age!

The years spent in Kazakhstan refer to the golden age of the poetic activity of Ajiniyaz. During this period, he created a large number of his famous poems. Ajiniyaz opened schools in the villages of Bozataw, Kamis Buget, and Jetim Uzak for the children from poor families where he taught them grammar. Until his death in 1874, he continued to write poems.

== Bozataw tragedy ==
Ajiniyaz was an active participant in the Bozataw tragedy which affected the Karakalpak people. The trial suffered by the native people resulted in Ajiniyaz's famous poem Bozataw:

Century of Land with nation, nation is with land,
Grief is awaiting us, landless in exile.
We won’t forget the pain, tribe will disappear
You were our bread-winner, dear Bozataw.

Heard, firing started out before sunrise,
Slept as free before-woke up as a slaver,
Hands were tied up-where is the struggle…
Your son was captured suddenly, Bozataw.

== Honours ==
- Nukus State Pedagogical Institute named after Ajiniyaz
- A monument of Ajiniyaz holding Karakalpak national instrument "duwtar" is established in Nukus, near the Savitsky Museum
