= 1951 anti-Chechen pogrom in Kazakhstan =

Pogrom

- Part of the Ethnic conflicts in Kazakhstan
- Location: Kazakhstan
- Date: 10 April 1951 – 18 June 1951
- Target: Chechen civilians
- Attack type: Pogrom
- Deaths: 41

The anti-Chechen pogrom in Kazakhstan took place in spring and summer, 1951, in Kazakhstan (part of the Soviet Union at the time), upon ethnic tensions between mainly ethnic Russians and deported Chechens. A blood libel rumor, according to which the Chechens allegedly use "Christian blood in their rituals" may also have contributed to the escalation of events. The riots occurred in 3 cities - Leninogorsk, Ust-Kamenogorsk and Zyryanovsk.

The main riots took place on April 10, 1951, in the Chechen-city neighbourhood of Leninogorsk. The riots, led by groups of amnestied criminals, targeted Chechen civilians and led to the deaths of 40-41 people, mainly of North Caucasian origins. Arrests were later made by Soviet authorities and 50 people from among the criminals were prosecuted, though no leaders were identified.

== See also ==
- Aardakh
- Ethnic violence
- Racism in Russia
- 1958 Grozny riots
- Blood libel
