= Karatau, Karakalpakstan =

Karatau
- urban-type settlement
- Location in Uzbekistan
- Coordinates: 42°05′23″N 60°16′39″E
- Country: Uzbekistan
- Autonomous Republic: Karakalpakstan
- City: Nukus

Population (1989)
  - Total: 2,094
- Time zone: UTC+5 (UZT)

Karatau (Uzbek: Karatau/Каратау, Russian: Каратау) is an urban-type settlement of Karakalpakstan in Uzbekistan. Administratively, it is part of the city of Nukus.
