= Tokamak (disambiguation) =

A tokamak is a fusion reactor device.

Tokamak may also refer to:

- Tokamak de Fontenay aux Roses, the first French tokamak
- Tokamak (DC Comics), a supervillain in DC Comics

== See also ==
- Tokmak (disambiguation)
