= Moynaq district =

District in Karakalpakstan, Uzbekistan

Coordinates: 43°46′N 59°02′E

Muynak district Мойнақ районы, Moynaq rayoni
- District
- Moynaq district
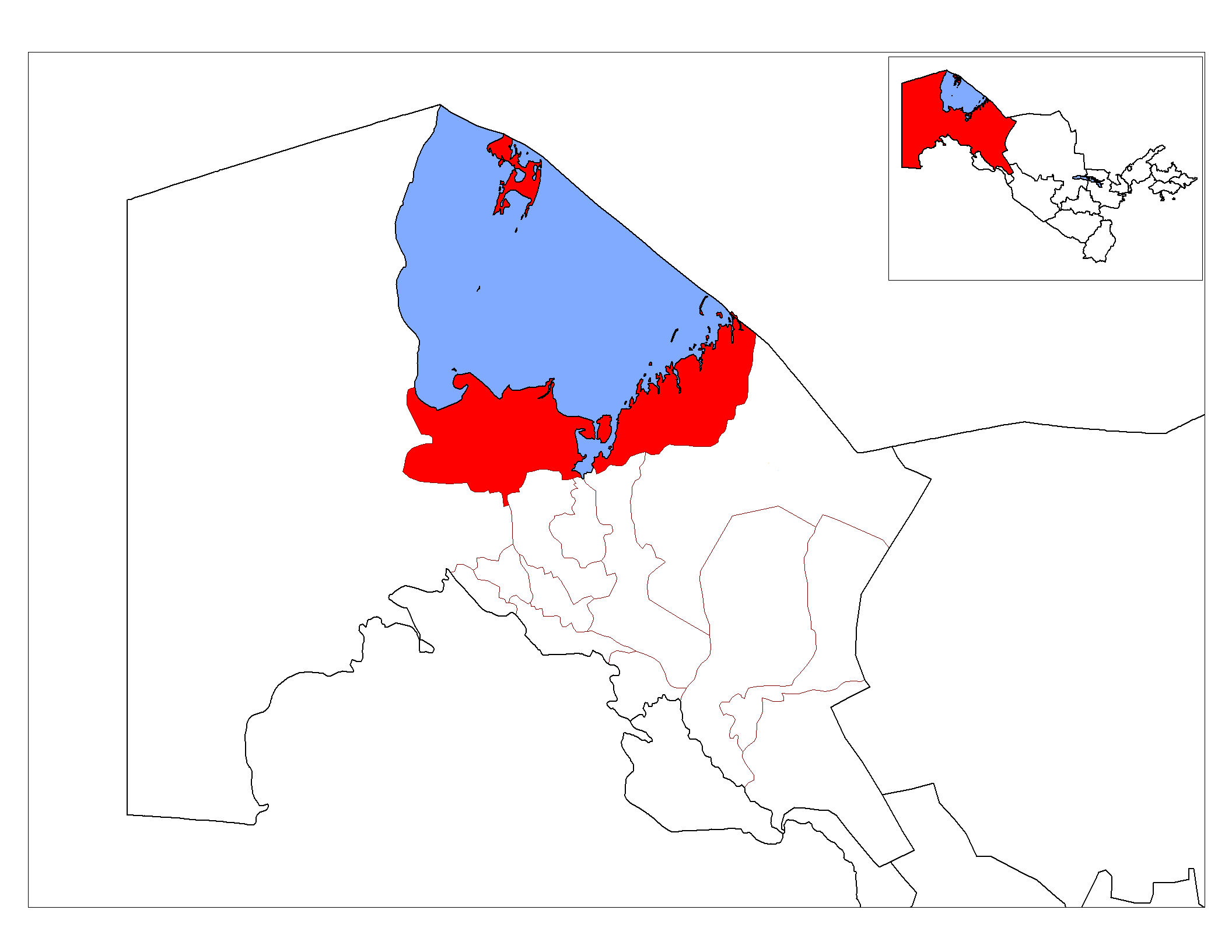
- Country: Uzbekistan
- Souvereign Republic: Karakalpakstan
- Capital: Moynaq, Muynak
- Founded: 19 September 1931

Area
  - Total: 37,880 km^{2} (14,630 sq mi)
- Elevation: 41 m (135 ft)

Population
  - Total: 33,000
  - Density: 0.87/km^{2} (2.3/sq mi)
- Time zone: UTC+5 (UZT)

Moynaq or also Muynak district (Karakalpak: Мойнақ районы/Moynaq rayonı) is a district of Karakalpakstan in Uzbekistan. The capital lies at the city Moynaq. Its area is 37,880 km^{2} (14,630 sq mi) and it had 33,000 inhabitants in 2022.

There is one city Moynaq and seven rural communities: Bozataw, Qazaqdárya, Mádeli, Tikózek, Ushsay, Hákim-ata, Qizil jar.
