= Moynaq =

Moynaq / Muynak Moynaq Moʻynoq
- Town

Мойнақ, Moynaq, Muynak transcription(s)
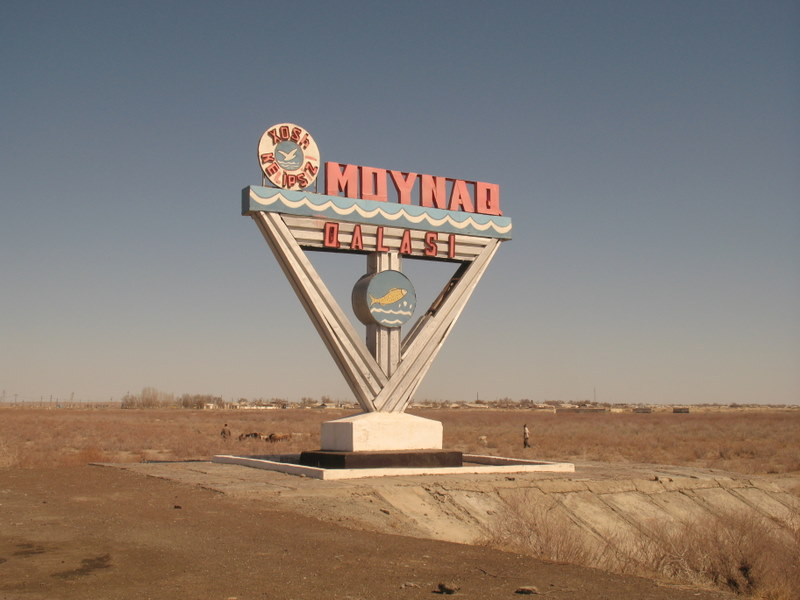
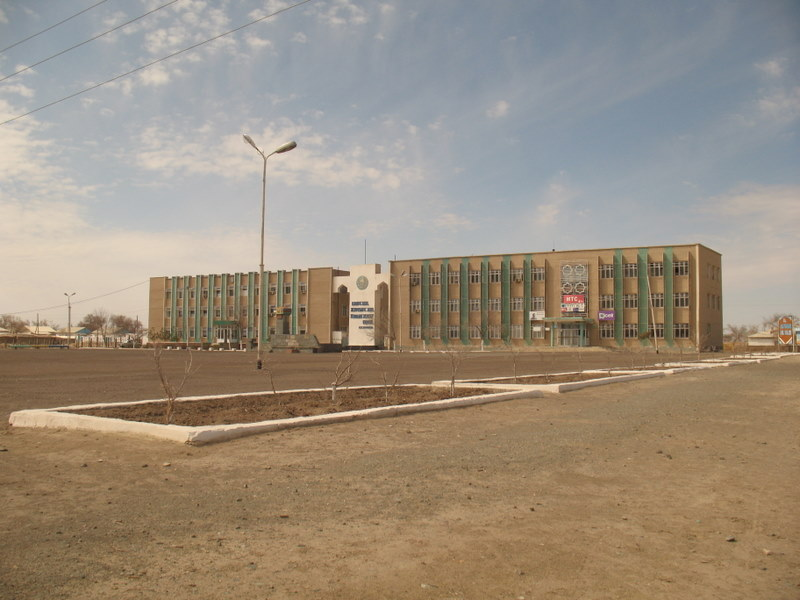
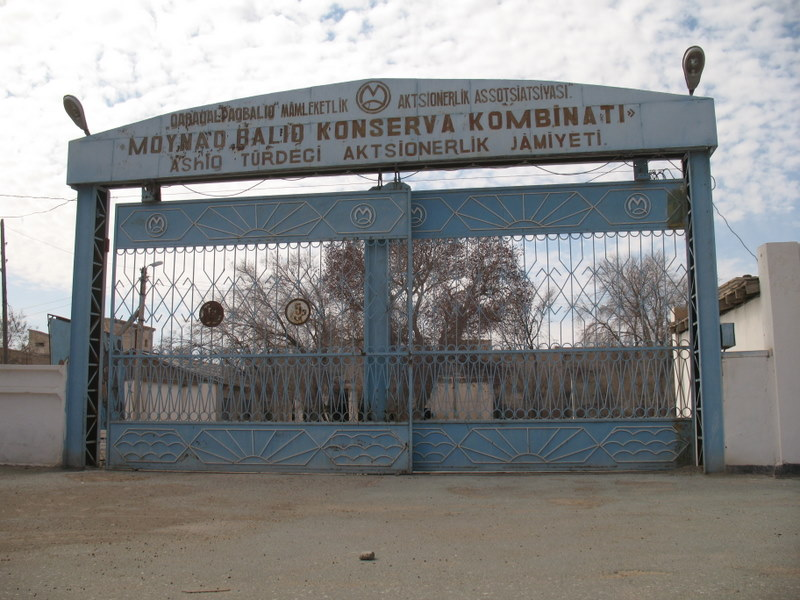
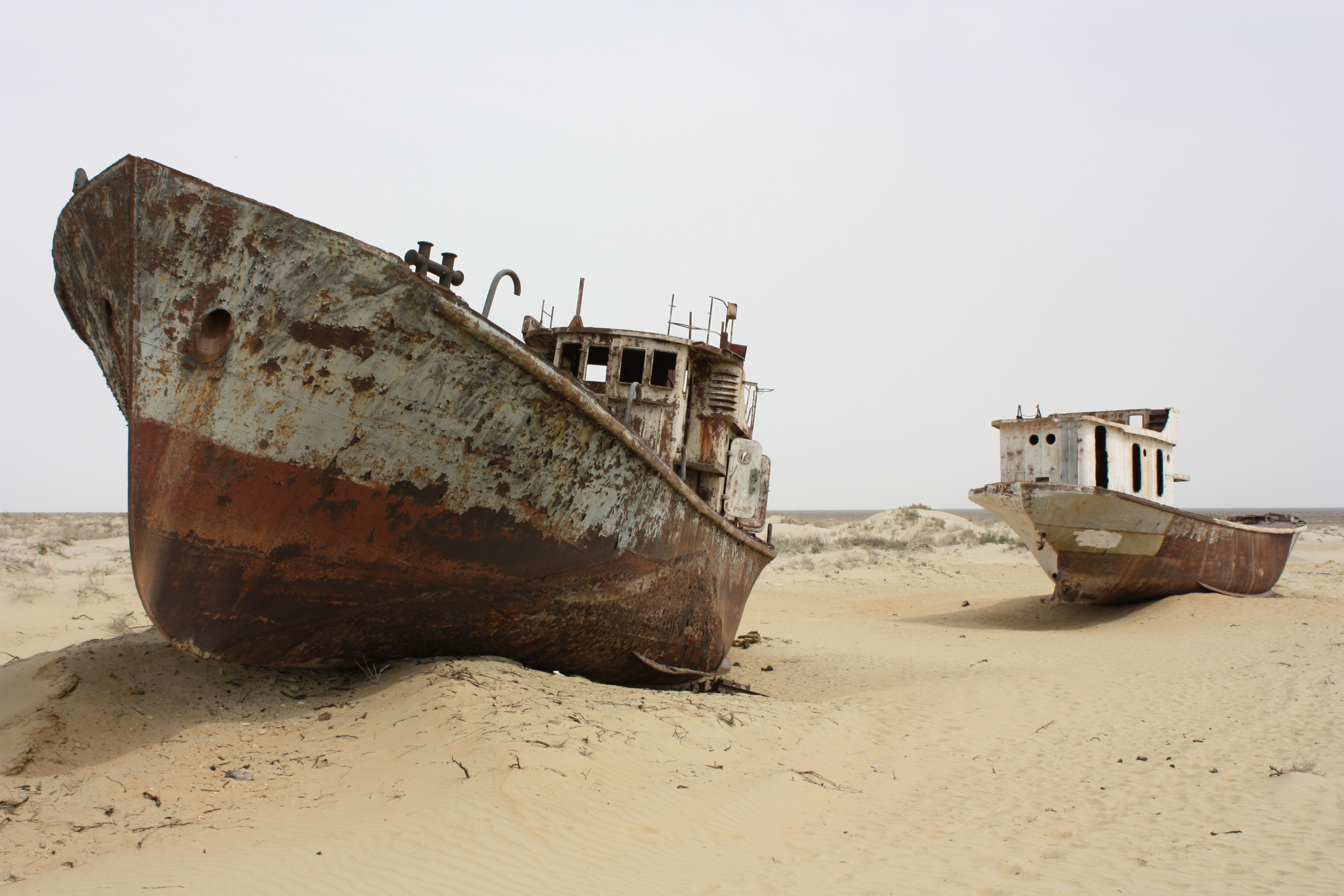
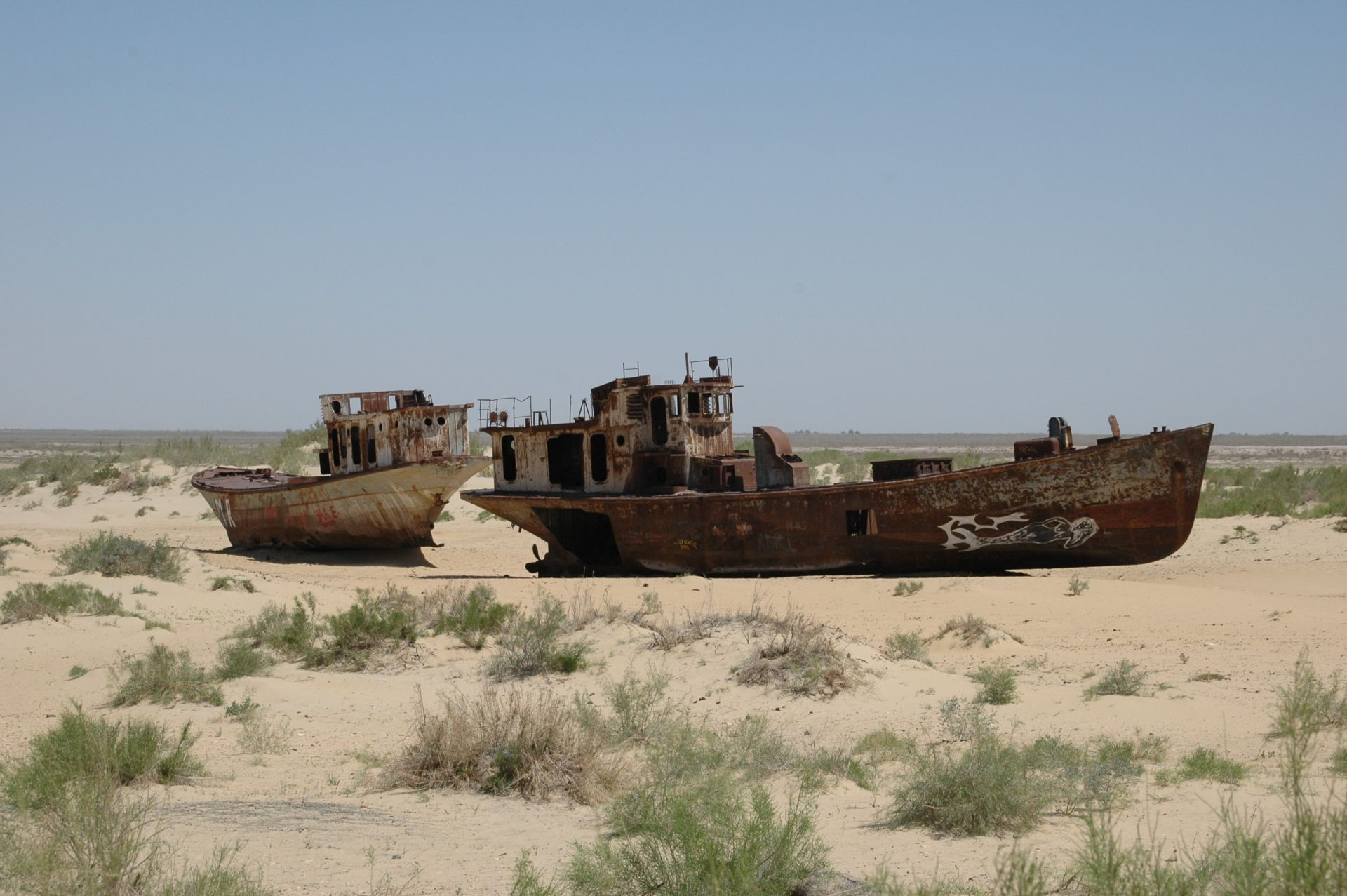
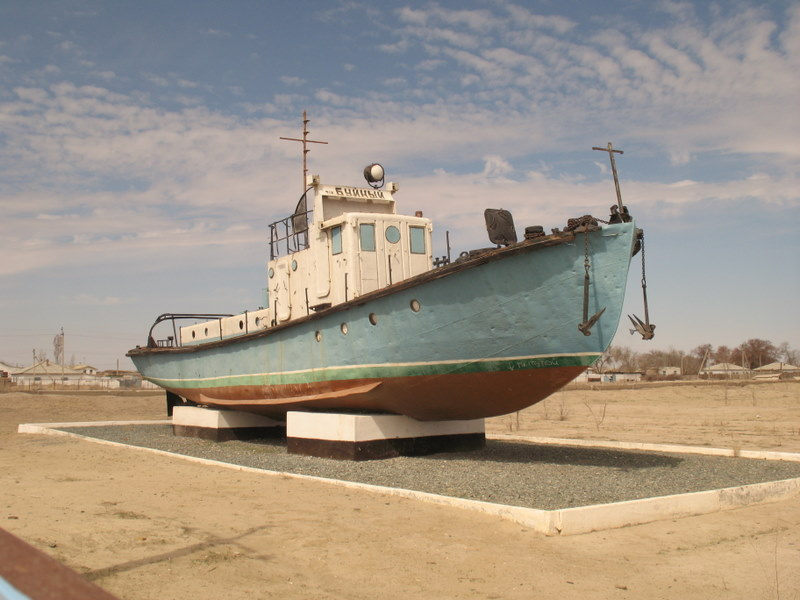

- Location in Karakalpakstan Moynaq (Uzbekistan)
- Coordinates: 43°46′N 59°02′E
- Country: Uzbekistan
- Autonomous Republic: Karakalpakstan
- District: Moynaq district
- Elevation: 55 m (180 ft)

Population (2018)
  - Total: 13,500

Moynaq, also spelled as Muynak (Karakalpak: Мойнақ, romanized: Moynaq; Uzbek: Moʻynoq; Russian: Муйнак, romanized: Muynak), is a city in northern Karakalpakstan, an autonomous republic in Uzbekistan. It is the seat of the Moynaq district. Formerly a sea port on the Aral Sea, it is now 150 km from the water in the Aralkum Desert and thus is a disaster tourism destination. It is also the location for the biggest electronic music festival in Central Asia.

== History ==
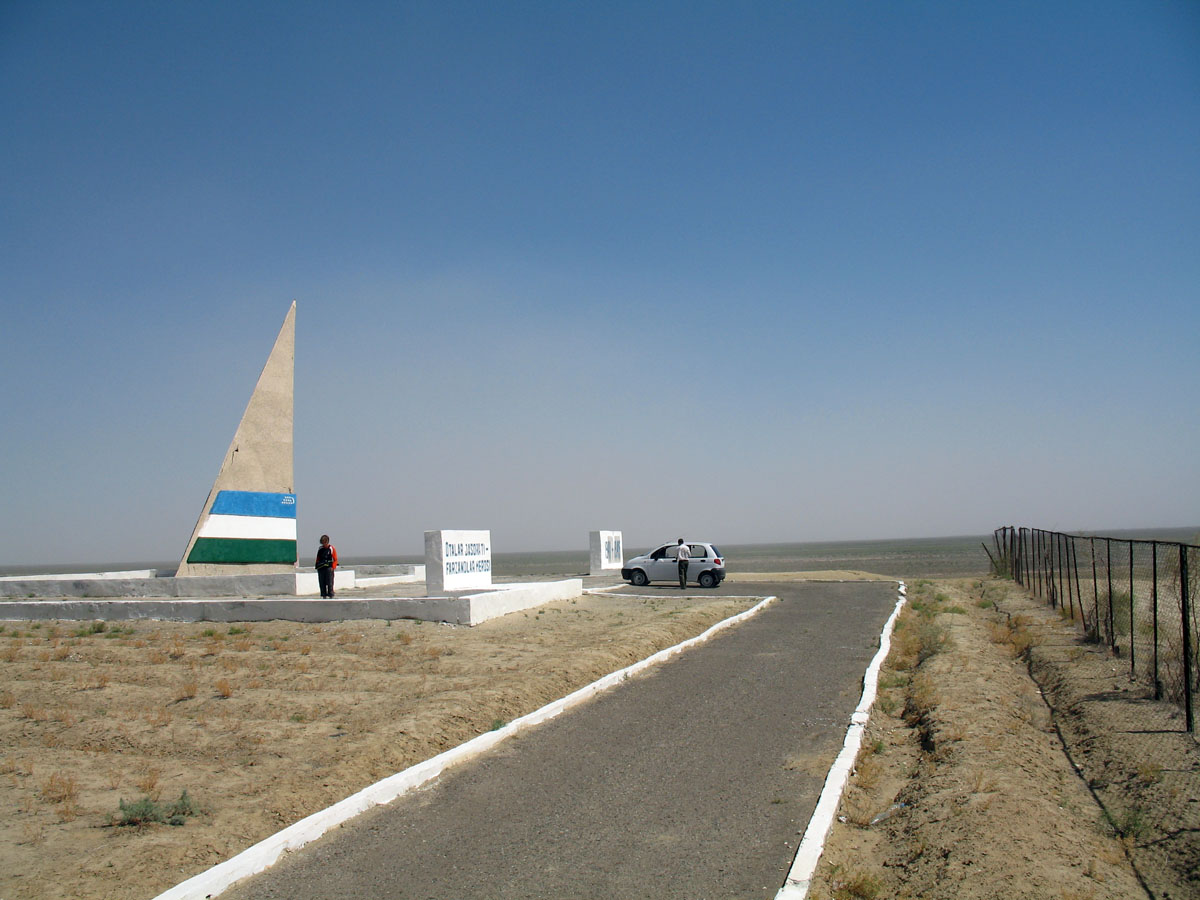
The Memorial above the former shore of the Aral Sea, now dried.

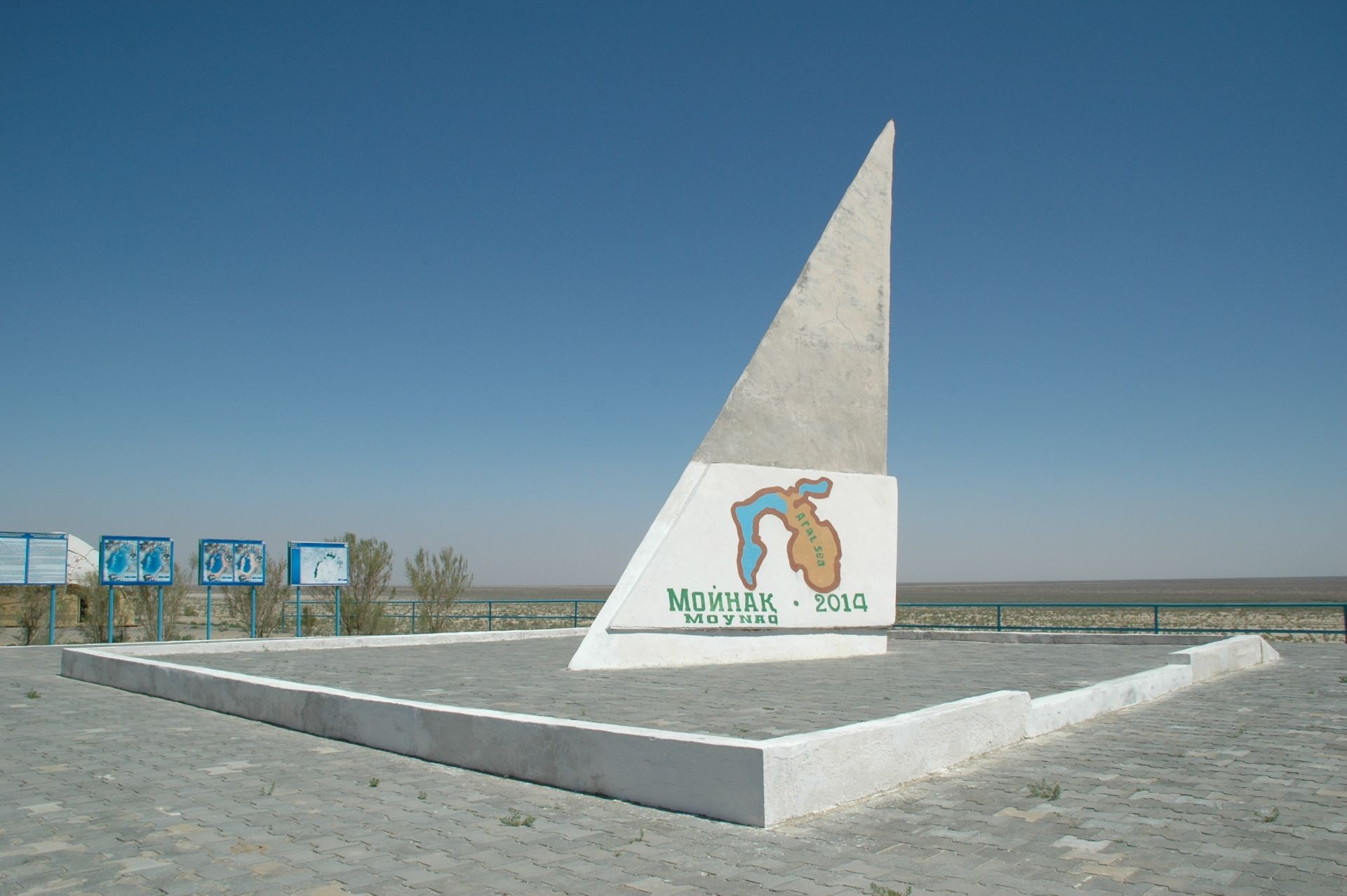

Once a bustling fishing community and Uzbekistan's only port city with tens of thousands of residents, Moynaq is now dozens of kilometers from the rapidly receding shoreline of the Aral Sea. Fishing had always been part of the economy of the region, and Moynaq became a center of industrial fishing and canning. However, a 1960s Soviet government diversion of the Amu Darya and Syr Darya rivers sapped the Aral Sea of its inflows, causing much of the lake to dry up and thus leaving the area susceptible to economic collapse. The regional Soviet-led agricultural monoculture dominated by cotton production diverted water from the aforementioned tributary rivers of the sea into irrigation, which resulted in severe pollution caused by agricultural chemical runoff. This, in turn, caused the sea to evaporate and left the remaining water with extremely high levels of salinity, which made it toxic and led to the ecological disaster that is destroying the sea and killing the residents of the towns in its vicinity, including Moynaq.

Moynaq's major attractions are the armada of rusting hulks that once made up its fishing fleet during the Soviet era, and a one-room museum devoted to Moynaq's heritage as a center of the fishing industry. Poisonous dust storms kicked up by strong winds across the dried and polluted seabed give rise to a multitude of chronic and acute illnesses among the few residents who have chosen to remain, most of them ethnic Karakalpaks, and weather unmoderated by the sea now buffets the town with hotter-than-normal summers and colder-than-normal winters.

== Culture ==
Stihia Festival, the largest electronic music festival in Central Asia, has been held in Moynaq annually since 2018. Described by Vice Media as “a techno rave in an abandoned ship graveyard,” the 2019 event attracted 10,000 people, as well as some of the best DJs in Uzbekistan and Europe. In 2022, the event was very successful, despite sandstorms.

Stihia means "an unstoppable force of nature" and it is a reference to both the Aral Sea environmental disaster and the power of music to bring people together. The festival is a collaboration of musicians, artists, scientists, engineers, and entrepreneurs, and Stihia N+1, a series of talks about arts, science, and technology, runs alongside the music event.

The Aral Sea Memorial is in the north end of Moynaq, amongst the rusting skeletons of the former fishing fleet. This ships’ graveyard is a reminder of the economic impact of the shrinking of the Aral Sea, which is often overlooked in discussion about the environmental disaster.

Moynaq Museum has paintings and photographs of the town in its more prosperous days. The exhibits demonstrate the wealth and importance of the place, not only due to fishing but also other industries such as fur farming and rush mat manufacturing.

== Wildlife ==
Saiga antelope can still be found in the wild around Moynaq. Although they migrate in large numbers, the saiga are vulnerable as they are hunted for their meat, and the males’ translucent horns are valuable in traditional Chinese medicine.

Moynaq is on a migration corridor for birds flying to and from Siberia, and the brackish pools between Moynaq and the Aral Sea are good spots for birdwatching. It is possible to see approximately 230 species of birds in the region, around half of which breed in the Sudochye Wetland, an internationally recognised Important Bird Area (IBA). 24 of these species are rare or vulnerable, and 13 of them are in the IUCN Red List. These included the now extinct slender-billed curlew.

== Population ==
The population was: 13,000 inhabitants in 1991 and 18,196 in 2012. Unlike most cities in Uzbekistan, Moynaq has a stable trend of population increase. The main part of the city's population is made up of Karakalpaks. There are also quite a large number of Uzbeks and Kazakhs living in the city. Among the national minorities there are also Tatars, Turkmens and others.

== Languages ==
As in the rest of Karakalpakstan, Uzbek and Karakalpak languages have official status in Moynaq. The Russian language actually has the status of a language of interethnic communication. English is also widespread among tourism and service workers in the city due to the popularity of the city among foreign tourists.

== Transport ==
Water transportation is currently absent. Moynaq port is not functioning. To the south-east of the city there is a small airfield operating irregularly. Public transportation is represented by rare Daewoo Damas shuttle buses, as well as private cabbies and cab drivers in passenger cars.

== Festival "Стихия" ("Element") ==
The annual non-commercial festival of electronic music, art and science "Стихия" ("Element") is held in Moynaq. The festival's mission is to help the Aral Sea region and raise awareness about the Aral Sea catastrophe. Today, "Стихия"("Element") is a mix of several projects involving musicians, DJs, producers, artists and scientists. They are all united by the common goal of creating a powerful attraction in a very unusual place on earth. Since the drying up of the sea, the festival is the most high-profile event. The festival usually lasts 2 days directly at the ship graveyard and has gained a lot of popularity among fans of the electronic music genre over the years. The festival ends with the ceremonial burning of a 10-meter high installation of the letters "SEA".

== See also ==
- Tokmak, Uzbekistan
