= Kazakh–Russian ethnic conflicts =

- Part of Ethnic conflicts in Kazakhstan
- Date: August 27, 1990 — present (35 years, 11 months, 2 weeks and 1 day)
- Location: Kazakhstan and Russia
- Methods: Protests, demonstrations, persecution, uprisings, riots, employment discrimination (particularly in public sector jobs), hostility and harassment in everyday interactions
- Status: Ongoing

Parties
Government of Kazakhstan: Azat Civil Movement of Kazakhstan; Kazakh nationalists	National Bolshevik Party; Russian separatists Russian rebels

Lead figures
Jasaral Quanyşälin; Aisulu Kadyrbaeva; Oral Saulebaev	Alexander Martynov; Nikolai Gunkin (POW); Yuri Antoshko (POW); Victor Antoshko (POW); Eduard Limonov (surrendered); Victor Kazimirchuk (POW)

Number
113–10,000	4,000

Casualties and losses
Unknown	Unknown
- 2,000,000—3,000,000 Voluntarily left from Kazakhstan

Casualties
- Death: ~200+
- Injuries: 20+
- Arrested: 86+ arrested

Kazakh–Russian ethnic conflicts refers to the ethnic clashes between Kazakhs and Russians that occurred from the late 20th to early 21st century.

== Separatism ==
Map of North Kazakhstan

North Kazakhstan Region and other ethnic Russian parts of Kazakhstan

- ethnic group: Russians in Kazakhstan
  - proposed: independence for the Russians in Kazakhstan

Mangystau Region

- Ethnic group: Kazakhs
  - Proposed state: Adaistan

Kyzylorda Region

- Ethnic group: Koryo-saram
  - Proposed: autonomy for the Koryo-saram

== Events ==
=== Kazakh–Cossack conflict of 1990 ===
In 1990, tensions escalated between local Cossacks and Kazakh nationalists in Uralsk. On August 27, the Cossacks held a rally in the city center, where a resolution was passed demanding the invalidation of the transfer of the Ural Oblast to Kazakhstan in 1920. The organizers of the rally were fined, but the Cossacks persisted in their demands. On September 4 of the same year, the Uralsk City Council declared the Russian language the local official language.

=== Ural events of 1991 ===
On September 15, 1991, the Cossacks celebrated the 400th anniversary of their service to the Russian crown in Uralsk. It was essentially the first and now the last large-scale event of the revived Ural Cossacks in 1990. Despite objections from the local administration and the mobilization of the Kazakh nationalist-patriotic organization "Azat," the Cossack leaders persisted in their preparations for the celebration, inviting hundreds of Cossacks from the Russian Federation. In response, the Kazakh authorities deployed hundreds of nationalist demonstrators to Uralsk, including thousands of students and young Kazakhs from the entire Uralsk region.

On that day, thousands of Kazakhs continued their protests in the square in front of the city hall, while a picket of young Kazakhs was sent to the cultural center. However, when the Cossacks began their assembly, thousands of demonstrators from the square broke through to the cultural center. According to the Cossack researcher Nikolai Fokin in his book "The Final Tragedy: Urals Cossacks in the 20th Century," thousands of Russian workers and Cossacks at the Voroshilov Plant were ready to resist the "Azat" activists.

The leaders of the Cossacks present at the cultural center that day denied any proclamations of separatist slogans, stating that it was a festive concert. They mentioned that representatives of the authorities interrupted the meeting several times, expressing concerns about their ability to restrain the "Azat" supporters. Ultimately, the crowded hall of 700 seats was quickly evacuated through the fire exit by the Cossacks, numerous observers, journalists from Russia, and local officials.

=== Uprising in Öskemen of 1994 ===
In 1994 some 10,000 people gathered for a rally in Öskemen, organized by the local Slavic Culture Society, demanding the establishment of a Russian autonomy in Eastern Kazakhstan, the elevation of the Russian language to the status of a state language, and the implementation of dual citizenship. In response, the presidential decree "On Measures to Regulate the Activities of Free Economic Zones" was issued, effectively revoking the resolution on the establishment of the Eastern Kazakhstan and other free economic zones. This move effectively curbed the economic foundation for separatist sentiments.

=== Almaty conflict of 1994–1995 ===
During this period certain representatives of the Cossack community made statements about their "readiness to use force." The speeches of Cossack activists in November and December 1994 heightened tensions in Almaty and Eastern Kazakhstan. In the same month, the activities of the "Society for the Assistance of the Semirechye Cossacks" were suspended. The escalation of relations between the Cossacks and the Kazakhstani authorities ultimately led to the arrest of the ataman of the Semirechye Cossacks, Nikolai Gunkin, in the autumn of 1995.

=== Kökşetau uprising of 1996–1997 ===
In spring 1996, the leaders of the "Kokchetav Division of the Siberian Cossack Host," brothers Yuri and Viktor Antoshko, attempted to organize an uprising in the Kokshetau Oblast, with the aim of establishing a "state" similar to Transnistria or Abkhazia. Viktor Antoshko traveled to cities in Russia to recruit supporters who would become the striking force of the future uprising.

"In March 1997, the Semirechye Cossacks came to Moscow and asked us for help, either in terms of money or manpower. We lacked funds, so we formed a unit and went there. On May 2, a Cossack assembly was planned in Kokshetau, during which the independence of the Kokshetau region was to be declared. Subsequently, the local maslikhat was supposed to vote on this declaration. In the event of a failed peaceful resolution, an armed uprising was planned. The Kazakhstani authorities made serious preparations to counter the Russian Cossack uprising. All roads, railways, and the airport were blocked. A joint operation of Russian and Kazakhstani special services was conducted to suppress the uprising. Russian special services dismantled two rebel bases in the Kurgan and Omsk Oblasts."

=== Pugachev's Rebellion of 1999 ===
At the end of the last century, Öskemen was in turmoil. Thousands of outraged people took to the square due to massive debts in wages, pensions, and social benefits. Some even attempted to leverage this situation for their own political gains, almost plunging the region into a civil confrontation. These events remain in the history of modern Kazakhstan as the "Pugachev Rebellion."

In the summer of 1998, Pugachev, also known as Kazimyrchuk, first appeared in Eastern Kazakhstan. He brought with him two letters of recommendation from Chernyshov to a well-known regional political figure and a radically inclined deputy of the oblast's maslikhat, Ivanov, and a certain Dashkov, associated with the radical wing of the Cossack community.

In the summer of 1999, Pugachev and Chernyshov together traveled to Eastern Kazakhstan. As later established by the employees of the Department of the National Security Committee in East Kazakhstan, in coordination with the central apparatus of the agency, the leader of the "Rus" Public Opinion Organization had a plan to secede the region from Kazakhstan. However, he had not yet figured out how to implement it. During the period of Kazimyrchuk and Chernyshov's stay in Ust-Kamenogorsk, a public appeal from the East Kazakhstan region to the "Rus" Public Opinion Organization and the State Duma of the Russian Federation was prepared, primarily addressing the negative aspects of the socio-economic and political situation in the region. Requests for assistance were also included in this appeal. When Kazimyrchuk arrived in Moscow, he finally concluded that it was necessary to seize power in the East Kazakhstan region by force, for which he formed a group.

The backbone of this group consisted of Russian citizens, with one individual from Moldova. Several of Chernyshov's associates also joined them in Ust-Kamenogorsk. Weapons were purchased in Omsk: 270 rounds of 5.45 mm caliber, 4 AK-47 magazines, and an F-1 grenade–such data is preserved in the case materials.

Meanwhile, Pugachev's group made its way to Öskemen. By this time, the leader had clearly outlined to his team the specific goal of seizing power in Eastern Kazakhstan by force and establishing the autonomous formation of Russian Altai. Pugachev approached the achievement of his goal with utmost seriousness, introducing military elements into the group's management, issuing orders, reports, assigning roles internally, appointing himself as the commander, and designating his deputy and chief of staff. After the arrest, the National Security Committee conducted a search in the OPG headquarters and was surprised by the level of ideological and theoretical preparation for the coup. Among the confiscated items were books on the history and practice of anarchism, works by researchers of opposition political forces, "Declarative Positions of the Rus Public Opinion Organization," "Russian Nationalism and the National Question in Russia," "Declaration of the National Bloc," and others.

On June 8, 2000, the Öskemen court sentenced 13 people, 11 Russians and 2 Kazakhs, convicted of planning to overthrow the local government and of illegal possession of weapons. The court sentenced the leader of the group, Vladimir Kazimirchuk, to 18-years imprisonment.

=== North Kazakhstan crisis of 2000–2001 ===
In 2000–2001, Eduard Limonov was accused of preparing an armed invasion in Kazakhstan to protect the Russian-speaking population.

In April 2001, he was imprisoned in the Lefortovo FSB investigative isolation facility on charges of possession of weapons and the creation of illegal armed formations (the charges were later dropped). On April 15, 2003, he was sentenced to 4 years of imprisonment.

=== Relations after the annexation of Crimea by the Russian Federation ===
Alexander Chebotaryov notes that "the situation in Ukraine has intensified the assessments from national-patriotic forces regarding the extent of the Russian-speaking population's loyalty to the Kazakhstan state." The lack of support for the idea of the "Russian world" from Russia can be explained by Astana's generally pro-Russian policy. Russia and Kazakhstan are united by their membership in organizations such as the CIS, CSTO, SCO, and the EAEU. The preservation of positive Kazakhstan-Russia relations is explained by Russia's desire to become an energy superpower.

==== Russian emigration ====
In September–October 2022, following Vladimir Putin's mobilization announcement in Russia, over 406,000 Russians entered Kazakhstan. While the average daily immigration of Russians had been around 8,000–9,000 per day, during these days, the average daily influx of Russians reached 30,000 individuals. Despite the significant flow of incoming Russians in the last decade of September, the border and migration services ensured uninterrupted operations. Since October 1, the average daily number of incoming Russians has stabilized and does not exceed 6,000–7,000 per day. As of September 21, 3578 applications for permanent residence and 965 for citizenship have been processed.

=== Petropavlovsk People's Soviet ===
On March 23, 2023, a group of Petropavl residents formed the "People’s Council of Workers of Petropavlovsk" and declared the independence of the Kazakh Soviet Socialist Republic, consisting of Petropavl and North Kazakhstan, rejecting Kazakhstan's 1991 declaration of independence from the Soviet Union. Vyacheslav Zuderman, the author of the proclamation, was elected chairman at the same meeting. The event was held in one of the halls of the North Kazakhstan State University, and was attended by 19 people. Almost unanimously, everyone voted for the formation of the council, with one man abstaining from voting.

By the evening of March 30, the North Kazakhstan Regional Police Department launched an investigation into the incident.

On April 2, two of the group's members explained that they had not intended to declare independence from Kazakhstan itself, but instead, were objected to "the oligarchs who had captured the country through their underhanded, corrupt means."

On November 28, the Petropavl City Court issued a sentence to four members. The organizer, Vyacheslav Zuderman, was sentenced to 9 years in prison, while three other associates participating were sentenced to 7 years each.

=== Statements by Russian politicians about Kazakhstan ===
On February 27, 2024, Russian Minister of Defense Sergei Shoigu stated that non-governmental organizations in Central Asia have escalated anti-Russian activities amid Russian invasion of Ukraine. The Minister also stated that there are over 100 "large pro-Western non-governmental organizations" operating in Central Asia, with more than 16,000 branches and offices.

Against the backdrop of the special military operation, these NGOs have significantly increased their anti-Russian activities aimed at undermining military-technical, economic, and cultural cooperation between the states of Central Asia and Russia. We are taking preemptive measures.

Between March 14 and 20, State Duma deputy Andrey Lugovoy released several documentary projects related to Kazakhstan. The originals of the projects were posted on Rutube under the title 'Kazakhstan's Turn' — a total of two parts were presented. In his projects, A. Lugovoy noted the increase in Russophobia in Kazakhstan and British interference in the politics of the Republic of Kazakhstan.

==== Events after Crocus attack ====
After the terrorist attack on Crocus City Hall, which occurred on March 22, raids and sweeps by Russian security forces against migrants from Central Asia began in Russia. Following the detention of suspects in the attack, Russian ultranationalist and pro-war Telegram channels started calling for violence against migrants from Central Asia, suggesting deporting them along with their families.

== See also ==
- Jeltoqsan
- Dissolution of the Soviet Union
