= Karl Heinrich Menges =

German linguist (1908–1999)

Karl Heinrich Menges (April 22, 1908 – September 20, 1999) was a German linguist known for his advocacy of the Altaic hypothesis. He was a faculty member at Columbia University in New York and subsequently at the University of Vienna.

== Biography ==
Menges was born in Frankfurt, where he was educated at the Lessing Gymnasium. He studied at the University of Frankfurt am Main and the Ludwig-Maximilians-Universität München, and earned his doctorate at the Friedrich Wilhelm University of Berlin in 1932. Politically identifying as a Catholic centrist, he resisted the Nazi regime, distributing leaflets. In 1936, he was arrested by the Gestapo and interrogated for five hours; on a tip-off from a classmate, after being released pending trial he fled to Czechoslovakia, after the annexation of the Sudetenland moving on to Turkey.

Menges taught at Columbia University in New York for 36 years, from 1940 to 1976. He had been invited to teach Slavic languages; the university discovered only after his arrival that he was a scholar of the then little-studied Altaic languages. After his retirement from Columbia University, he taught at the University of Vienna until shortly before his death in Vienna at the age of 91. Over his career, he taught at a total of 13 institutions in seven countries.

At the age of 19, Menges was one of the first Westerners to visit the Volga region and the Caucasus within the Soviet Union. He was quoted variously as saying he spoke between 24 and "over 50" languages, and said that when he came to the United States he was the only person in the country who could speak Uzbek. He won a Guggenheim Fellowship in 1972. He published numerous articles and 15 books; a revised edition of his The Turkic Languages and Peoples, first published in 1968, appeared in 1995. His articles, as well as his teaching, were characteristically interdisciplinary, and in addition to Altaic, he made important contributions to Slavic, Turkic, Tungusic, and Dravidian language studies. A complete thematically organized index of his publications appeared in 2006.
