= Ethnic conflicts in Kazakhstan =

The conflicts in Kazakhstan refer to a series of insurgencies in Kazakhstan that date back to when the country was part of the Soviet Union, then known as the Kazakh Soviet Socialist Republic. These conflicts have largely been ethnic-based, although in recent years they have decreased in numbers. Some of these conflicts have called for the independence, or the increased autonomy of the group in the country.

== General prerequisites for conflicts ==
The first post-war inter-ethnic clashes and conflicts occurred with the deported communities of ethnic minorities which were settled on Kazakh lands during the Second World War. The first ethnic conflicts that occurred in the post-war years were also associated with Nikita Khrushchev's Virgin Lands campaign of the late 1950s. During this period, about six million Russians and Ukrainians from the RSFSR and the Ukrainian SSR moved into the Kazakh SSR to work in the vast agricultural collective farmlands. This created a significant demographic imbalance of the population. Many conflicts were classified by local law enforcement agencies as criminal offenses by a large group of people, and the authorities tried to hide such events from the public. After the dissolution of the Soviet Union, all small-scale conflicts were mainly against representatives of small groups such as Kurds, Chechens, Lezgins, Avars, Dargins, and Uyghurs. Most of these conflicts took place between Kazakhs and representatives of the Caucasian peoples, as well as the Uyghurs. The absence of serious mass interethnic conflicts of Kazakhs with larger ethnic groups have often been attributed to the multinational nature of the country, as well as a large percentage of Kazakhs who speak a second language besides their native Kazakh language.

== List of ethnic conflicts in Kazakhstan ==
- 1951 anti-Chechen pogrom in Kazakhstan
- 1989 Noviy Uzen conflict – Also known as the Novouzenskaya massacre, it took place on 17–28 June 1989 between groups of Kazakhs and people from the North Caucasus. The riot combined elements of strong social discontent, anti-Soviet ideas and inter-communal clashes, directed primarily against people from the Caucasus. The riot was suppressed by special forces. The exact number of deaths is unknown (figures from 4 to 200 people are called).
- 1989—present Kazakh–Russian ethnic conflicts.
- 1992 Ust-Kamenogorsk clashes between Kazakhs and Chechens
- On 20 August 2006, anti-Caucasian demonstrations took place in the city of Aktau. Later that October, an interethnic conflict took place, with a mass brawl taking place between Turkish and Kazakh workers at the Tengiz Field located in the Zhylyoi District of the Atyrau Region.
- In November 2006, a Kazakh-Uyghur conflict took place in Shelek.
- In March 2007, a Kazakh-Chechen conflict took place in the Almaty Region.
- In October–November 2007, an anti-Kurdish conflict took place in the village of Mayatas, located in the Tole Bi District of the Turkistan Region between Kurds and Kazakhs.
- In February 2015, pogroms of the local Tajik population took place in the village of Bostandyk.
- Interethnic clashes between Kazakhs and Turks took place in February 2016, in the village of Buryl, Jambyl Region, when a 17-year-old Turkish teenager broke into a house where he killed a 5-year-old Kazakh boy. As a result, the houses of the Turks in the village were attacked by people throwing stones.
- On New Year's Eve and New Year's Day in 2018/2019, a fight broke out at a Karaganda restaurant, which although was not of an interethnic nature, spurred anti-Armenian hostilities since a 23-year old Kazakh was killed and the restaurant owner was Armenian. Several Armenian families, fearing reprisals, left the city. Anti-Armenian unrest has spread to other cities across the country, with a mob attacking a coffee shop named Cafe Baku in Semey, confusing Armenia with Azerbaijan.
- 2020 Dungan–Kazakh ethnic clashes
- 2021 – Street clashes have agitated Pidzimè, a Kazakh town in the province of Panfilovo. The local authorities spoke of a "fight between young people" that began on the night of October 28 with verbal clashes and ended in a brawl with the use of sticks and improvised weapons. At a meeting of the municipal assembly, however, it became clear that this was a real inter-ethnic conflict. An injured boy comes from a Kazakh family, which is said to have provoked a reaction from other ethnic Uyghur locals. The group of attackers soon dispersed, but during the night there were several acts of vandalism and a fire was set in a private house in Pidžim, although the police say the fire 'has nothing to do with the previous beating'.

== See also ==
- Russian irredentism
- East Turkistan Government in Exile
- Tibetan independence movement
