= Tokmak, Uzbekistan =

Tokmak
- Location within Continental Asia Location within Uzbekistan
- Coordinates: 43°49′N 58°58′E
- Country: Uzbekistan

Tokmak is a settlement in Uzbekistan located on the south of the Aral Sea, near the town of Moynaq. The area has a population of around 3,000. The town used to be on the coast, but because of the shrinking Aral Sea, it is now over 70 kilometers (43 miles) from the coast of the sea.

In Moynaq, there is a mosque and mausoleum in honor of Tokmak Ata, a holy man from the 7th century.
