= Karakalpak language =

Kipchak Turkic language

Karakalpak
- Qaraqalpaq tili, Қарақалпақ тили, قاراغالفاق ٴتىلى
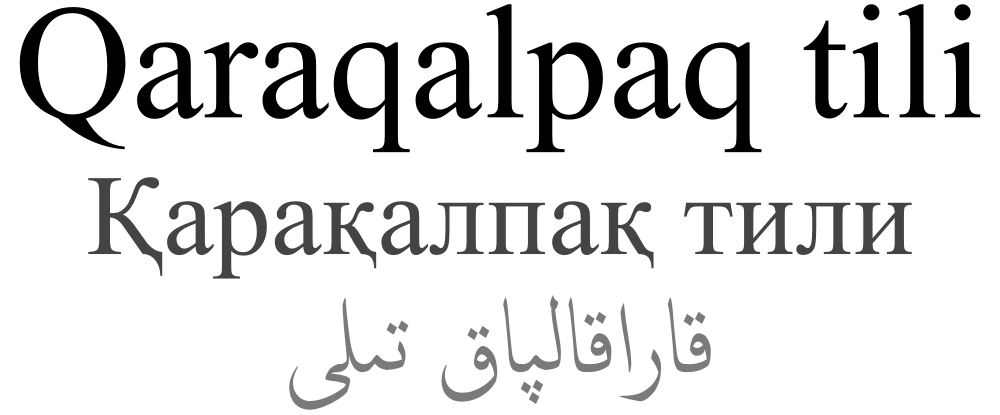
- Karakalpak written in Latin, Cyrillic, and Perso-Arabic scripts
- Native to: Central Asia
- Region: Karakalpakstan
- Ethnicity: Karakalpaks
- Native speakers: 871,970 (2023)
- Language family: Turkic: Common Turkic; Kipchak; Kipchak–Nogai; Karakalpak
- Writing system: Karakalpak alphabet (Latin, Cyrillic, Arabic script)

Official status
- Official language in: Karakalpakstan (Uzbekistan)

Language codes
- ISO 639-2: kaa
- ISO 639-3: kaa
- Glottolog: kara1467
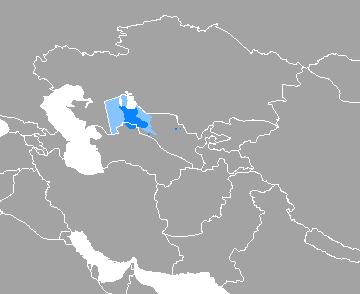
- Map showing the spread of Karakalpak (blue) within Central Asia

- Karakalpak is classified as Vulnerable by the UNESCO Atlas of the World's Languages in Danger

Karakalpak (Qaraqalpaq tili) is a Turkic language spoken by Karakalpaks in Karakalpakstan. It is divided into two dialects, Northeastern Karakalpak and Southwestern Karakalpak. It developed alongside Nogai and neighbouring Kazakh languages, being markedly influenced by both. Typologically, Karakalpak belongs to the Kipchak branch of the Turkic languages, thus being closely related to and highly mutually intelligible with Kazakh and Nogai.

== Classification ==
Karakalpak is a member of the Kipchak branch of Turkic languages, which includes Kazakh, Bashkir, Tatar, Kumyk, Karachay-Balkar, Nogai and Kyrgyz. Due to its proximity to Turkmen and Uzbek, some of Karakalpak's vocabulary and grammar has been influenced by Uzbek and Turkmen. Like the vast majority of Turkic languages, Karakalpak has vowel harmony, is agglutinative and has no grammatical gender. Word order is usually subject–object–verb.

== Geographic distribution ==
Karakalpak is spoken mainly in the Karakalpakstan Autonomous Republic of Uzbekistan. Approximately 2,000 people in Iran and Afghanistan, as well as smaller diaspora in parts of Russia, Kazakhstan, Turkey and other parts of the world speak Karakalpak.

=== Official status ===
Karakalpak has official status in the Karakalpakstan Autonomous Republic.

=== Dialects ===
Ethnologue identifies two dialects of Karakalpak: Northeastern and Southwestern. Menges mentions a third possible dialect spoken in the Fergana Valley. The Southwestern dialect has /tʃ/ for the Northeastern /ʃ/.

== Phonology ==
Karakalpak has 25 native consonant phonemes and regularly uses four non-native phonemes in loan words. Non-native sounds are shown in parentheses.

Karakalpak vowels, from Menges (1947:?)

=== Consonants ===
		Labials	Alveolar	Post-alv./ Palatal	Velar	Uvular	Glottal
Nasal		m ⟨m/м⟩	n ⟨n/н⟩		ŋ ⟨ń/ң⟩		
Stop	voiceless	p ⟨p/п⟩	t ⟨t/т⟩		k ⟨k/к⟩	q ⟨q/қ⟩	
Stop	voiced	b ⟨b/б⟩	d ⟨d/д⟩		ɡ ⟨g/г⟩		
Affricate			(t͡s) ⟨c/ц⟩	(t͡ʃ) ⟨ch/ч⟩			
Fricative	voiceless	(f) ⟨f/ф⟩	s ⟨s/с⟩	ʃ ⟨sh/ш⟩	x ⟨x/х⟩		h ⟨h/ҳ⟩
Fricative	voiced	(v) ⟨v/в⟩	z ⟨z/з⟩	ʒ ⟨j/ж⟩	ɣ ⟨ǵ/ғ⟩		
Approximant			l ⟨l/л⟩	j ⟨y/й⟩	w ⟨w/ў⟩		
Rhotic			r ⟨r/р⟩				

=== Vowels ===
	Front		Back	
	spread	rounded	spread	rounded
Close	i ⟨i/и⟩	y ⟨ú/ү⟩	ɯ ⟨ı/ы⟩	u ⟨u/у⟩
Mid	e ⟨e/е⟩	œ ⟨ó/ө⟩		o ⟨o/о⟩
Open	æ ⟨á/ә⟩		a ⟨a/а⟩	

==== Vowel harmony ====
Vowel harmony functions in Karakalpak much as it does in other Turkic languages. Words borrowed from Russian or other languages may not observe rules of vowel harmony, but the following rules usually apply:

Vowel	May be followed by:
a	a, ɯ
æ	e, i
e	e, i
i	e, i
o	a, o, u, ɯ
œ	e, i, œ, y
u	a, o, u
y	e, œ, y
ɯ	a, ɯ

== Vocabulary ==
=== Personal pronouns ===
	Singular	Plural
1st person	мен/men 'I'	бизлер/bizler 'we'
2nd person	сен/sen 'you'	сизлер/sizler 'you (pl.)'
3rd person	ол/ol 'he/she/it'	олар/olar 'they'

=== Numbers ===
1. бир – bir – 1
2. еки – eki – 2
3. үш – úsh – 3
4. төрт – tórt – 4
5. бес – bes – 5
6. алты – altı – 6
7. жети – jeti – 7
8. сегиз – segiz – 8
9. тоғыз – toǵız – 9
10. он – on – 10
- жүз – júz – 100
- мың – mıń – 1000
- миллион – million – 1000000

== Orthography ==
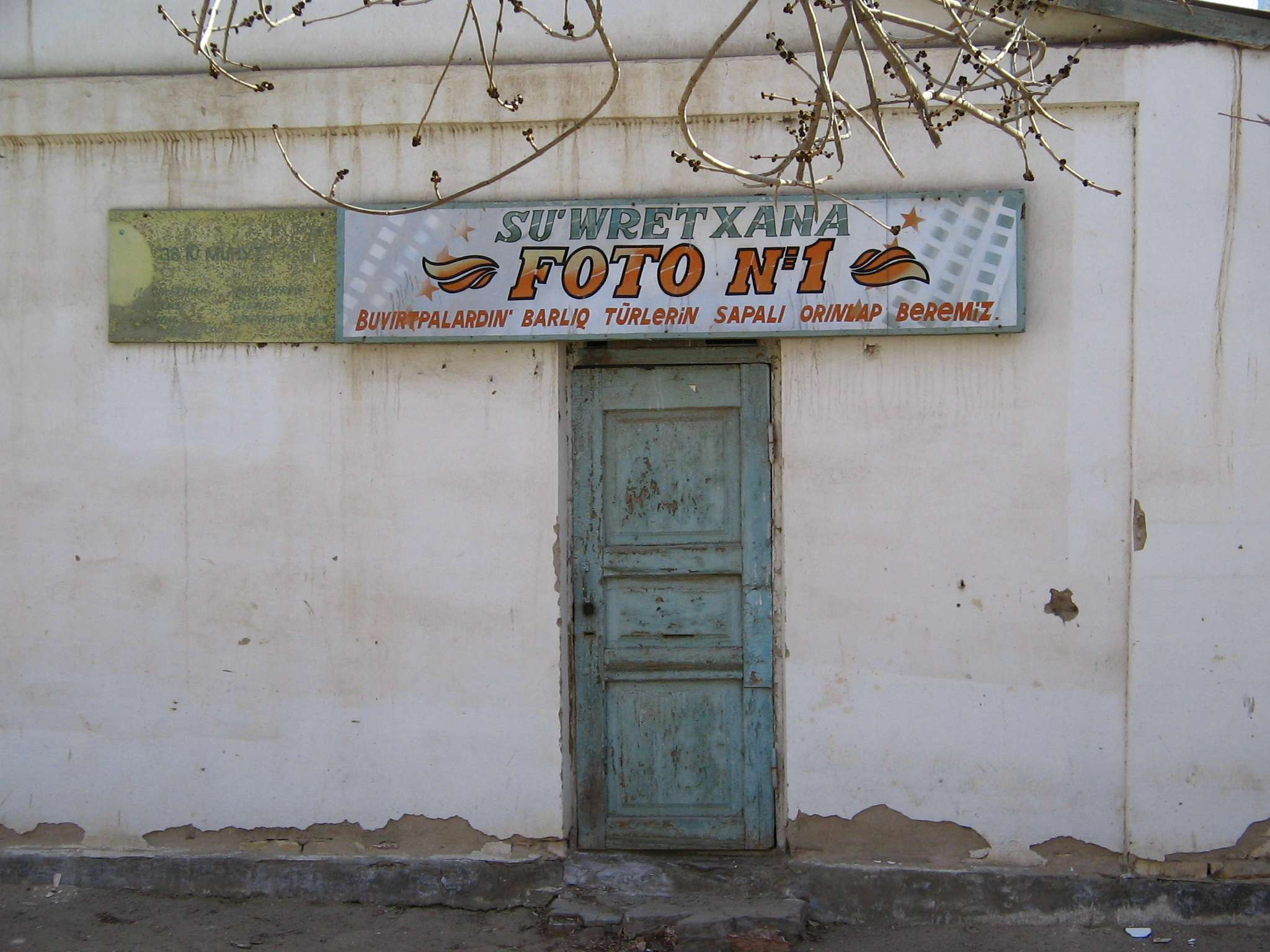
March 2006. A photo laboratory in Nukus – with the signboard written in Karakalpak language using the Latin alphabet

=== History ===
Karakalpak was written in the Perso-Arabic script until 1932, in the Latin script from 1928 to 1940, after which Cyrillic was introduced. Following Uzbekistan's independence in 1991, the decision was made to drop Cyrillic and revert to the Latin alphabet. Whilst the use of Latin script is now widespread in Tashkent, its introduction into Karakalpakstan remains gradual.

=== Arabic script ===
The original Arabic alphabet on its own has a number of significant shortcomings: it lacks letters to indicate a number of specific Karakalpak sounds. However, in line with developments in other Turkic-speaking communities of the Soviet Union—specifically the development of the Yaña imlâ alphabet in Tatarstan and Bashkortostan, and processes of standardization of the Arabic script in the Kazakh SSR and the Kirghiz SSR—the Karakalpak Arabic alphabet also underwent modifications and introduction of letters and conventions to represent the language more consistently.

A small uppercase hamza is used for indicating front vowels when vowel sounds cannot be perceived from other vowels or consonants in a word, very similar to the use of hamza in the Kazakh Arabic alphabet.

In November 1924, the first Karakalpak-language newspaper, Erkin Qaraqalpaq (ٴىيركىن قاراغالفاق; lit. 'Free Karakalpak'), was printed written in the Arabic script. In 1925 the first textbooks in Karakalpak were published written in the Arabic script. Writer and educator Seyfulǵábit Májitov played a major role in the creation of the alphabet and the release of the first primers.

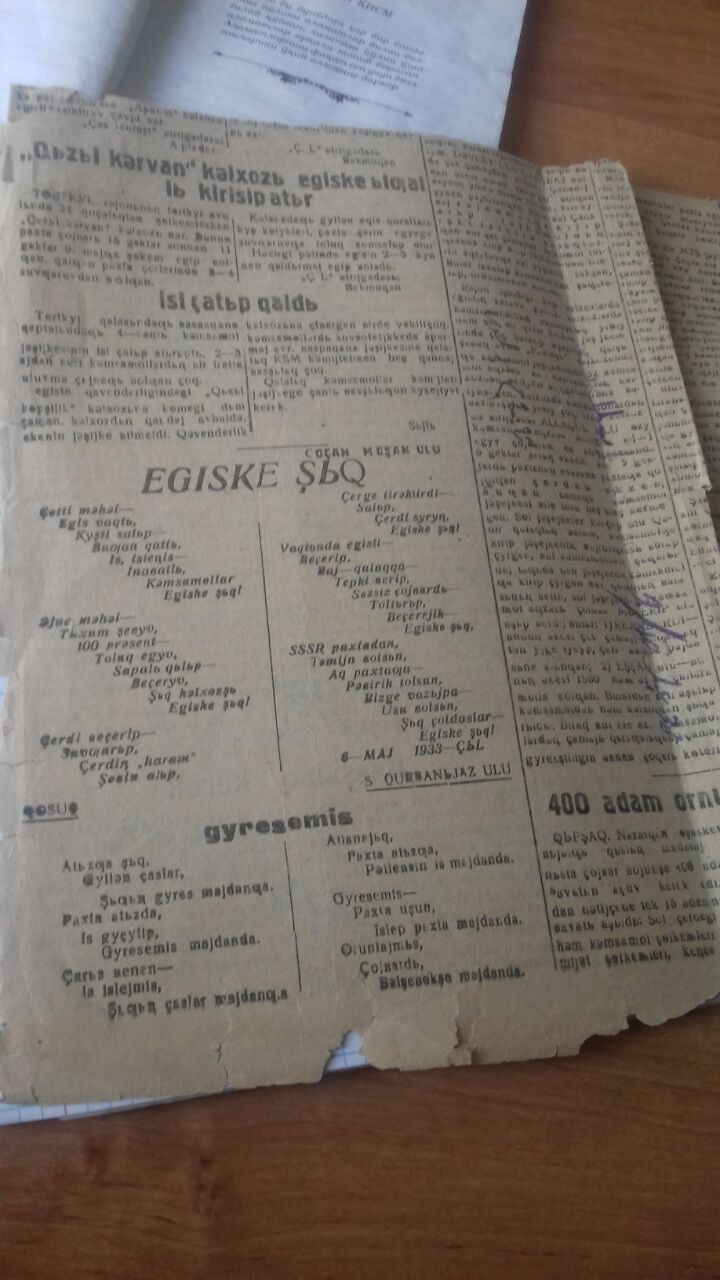
The newspaper Qızıl Qaraqalpaqstan in the Latin alphabet, 1935

=== Yañalif ===
In the 1920s, a campaign was launched in the Soviet Union to romanize the writing systems of various languages within the country. This campaign gained particular scope after the First Turkic Congress, held in 1926 in Baku, at which all Turkic peoples of the USSR were recommended to switch to a new alphabet (Çaꞑəlip). In July 1927, by the decision of the Karakalpak regional committee of the All-Union Communist Party of Bolsheviks, the regional committee of the new alphabet was created. On 30 July 1928, a new alphabet, developed under the leadership of K. Avezov and S. Madzhitov, was submitted for consideration to the Government of the Karakalpak Autonomous Okrug.

In late 1928, after taking into account a number of comments put forward by specialists and intellectuals, this alphabet was approved. It had 32 letters: a, ʙ, с, ç, d, e, ə, f, g, h, x, i, ь, j, k, l, m, n, ꞑ, o, ɵ, p, q, ƣ, r, s, t, u, v, y, z, ş. There were no capital letters in this alphabet. At the beginning of 1929, newspapers and books began to be published in this alphabet. By 1930, printing and education in Karakalpakstan had completely switched from the Arabic alphabet to the Latinized one.

In 1930, on the initiative of the Karakalpak intelligentsia, a meeting was held at the editorial office of the newspaper Miynetkesh qaraqalpaq on issues of the alphabet and spelling. As a result, it was decided to exclude the letter c from the alphabet and write ş instead. By that time, the question arose about establishing firm rules for Karakalpak spelling. In 1932, the Ethno-linguistic section of the Karakalpak Comprehensive Research Institute and the Educational and Methodological Council of the People's Commissariat for Education presented two projects for the Karakalpak orthography and alphabet. During the discussion, both projects were combined into one and in September 1932, at the First Karakalpak Spelling Conference, it was approved. The main change was the introduction of capital letters, as well as a change in the order of letters in the alphabet. Now it was arranged thusly: Aa, Bʙ, Vv, Gg, Dd, Ee, Çç, Zz, Ii, Jj, Kk, Ll, Mm, Nn, Oo, Pp, Rr, Ss, Tt, Uu, Ff, Xx, Şş, Hh, Əə, Qq, Ƣƣ, Ꞑꞑ, Ɵɵ, Yy, Ьь.

In June 1935, the Second Linguistic Conference was held in Turtkul. In addition to spelling issues, it also touched upon the issue of alphabet reform. It was proposed to exclude the letters Əə, Ɵɵ and Yy from it. However, during the discussion, this proposal was rejected, and the need for further elaboration of this issue was noted.

The third spelling conference was held in Turtkul in October 1938. The issue of alphabet reform was raised again. As a result, the letter Ŭŭ was introduced into the alphabet, the phonetic meaning of a number of letters was changed, and the order of their arrangement in the alphabet was slightly adjusted. As a result, the alphabet approved by the Presidium of the Supreme Council of the Karakalpak Autonomous Soviet Socialist Republic looked like this: Aa, Bʙ, Vv, Gg, Dd, Ee, Çç, Zz, Ii, Kk, Ll, Mm, Nn, Oo, Pp, Rr, Ss, Tt, Uu, Ff, Xx, Şş, Ꞑꞑ, Əə, Ɵɵ, Hh, Qq, Ƣƣ, Yy, Ŭŭ, Jj, Ьь.

=== Cyrillic script ===
In the late 1930s, the process of transferring scripts to a Cyrillic basis began in the Soviet Union. In 1940, K. Ubaydullaev, K. Aimbetov and N. Davkaraev developed an alphabet and spelling rules for the Karakalpak language based on the Cyrillic alphabet. This alphabet was introduced by decree of the Presidium of the Supreme Council of the Karakalpak Autonomous Soviet Socialist Republic on July 18, 1940. This decree also established a deadline of January 1, 1942 for the transition of the press, education and institutions to the new alphabet.

The new alphabet had 35 letters: Аа, Бб, Вв, Гг, Дд, Ее, Жж, Зз, Ии, Йй, Кк, Лл, Мм, Нн, Оо, Пп, Рр, Сс, Тт, Уу, Фф, Хх, Цц, Чч, Шш, Щщ, Ъъ, Ыы, Ьь, Ээ, Юю, Яя, Ғғ, Ққ, Ҳҳ. This alphabet had a number of significant shortcomings: it lacked signs to indicate the sounds /æ/, /œ/, /y/, /ŋ/ and /w/. To convey the sounds /æ/, /œ/, /y/, the letters а, о, у were used with the addition of a soft sign after the consonant letter located behind them (for example, тань (bread) instead of тәnн, созь (word) instead of сөз, жунь (wool) instead of жүн, etc.). To denote the sound /ŋ/, the нг digraph was used.

These shortcomings forced the Karakalpak Institute of Economics and Culture to develop a new alphabet and spelling rules for the Karakalpak language. In September 1954, a scientific and theoretical conference was held in Nukus, at which scientists from Karakalpakstan, Moscow, Tashkent and Frunze discussed the project of a new alphabet. The decisions of the conference were finalized taking into account the recommendations of the Institute of Language and Literature of the Academy of Sciences of the Uzbek SSR and the Institute of Linguistics of the Academy of Sciences of the Soviet Union. As a result, the current alphabet was clarified and a new set of spelling rules was compiled. On February 28, 1957, the new alphabet and spelling were approved by decree of the Presidium of the Supreme Council of the Karakalpak Autonomous Soviet Socialist Republic. This alphabet came into effect in 1960. Compared to the previous version, the letters Ә ә, Ё ё, Ң ң, Ө ө, Ү ү, Ў ў were introduced into the alphabet, and the order of the letters in the alphabet was also changed. As a result, the Karakalpak alphabet began to look like this:

А а	Ә ә	Б б	В в	Г г	Ғ ғ	Д д
Е е	Ё ё	Ж ж	З з	И и	Й й	К к
Қ қ	Л л	М м	Н н	Ң ң	О о	Ө ө
П п	Р р	С с	Т т	У у	Ү ү	Ў ў
Ф ф	Х х	Ҳ ҳ	Ц ц	Ч ч	Ш ш	Щ щ
Ъ ъ	Ы ы	Ь ь	Э э	Ю ю	Я я

In 1963 and 1964, the issue of improving the Karakalpak alphabet was again raised in the pages of the local press. On this basis, in 1964, a special commission was created from employees of the Institute of History, Language and Literature of the Karakalpak branch of the Academy of Sciences of the Uzbek Autonomous Soviet Socialist Republic, as well as teachers from the department of the Karakalpak language of the Karakalpak Pedagogical Institute and employees of the Institute for Advanced Training of Teachers of the Karakalpak Autonomous Soviet Socialist Republic. This commission developed a new draft alphabet and spelling. The project proposed the abolition of the letters ў and ң. However, this project caused objections among teachers and was not adopted as a result.

Despite the reforms of the 1990s and the 2000s, the Cyrillic alphabet of the 1957 model is still widely used. For instance, the largest newspaper in Karakalpakstan—Erkin Qaraqalpaqstan (Еркин Қарақалпақстан)—is still printed in the Cyrillic script, and document flow is carried out in government institutions.

=== Latin script ===
In the early 1990s, work began in independent Uzbekistan to translate the scripts of the peoples of this country onto a Latin basis. At the end of 1993, a project for a Latinized Uzbek alphabet was approved. Following this, in February 1994, a new alphabet was approved for the Karakalpak language. This alphabet was based on the General Turkic Alphabet and had the following form: Aa, Ää, Bb, Dd, Ee, Ff, Gg, Ḡḡ, Hh, Xx, Iı, İi, Jj, Kk, Qq, Ll, Mm, Nn, N̄n̄, Oo, Öö, Pp, Rr, Ss, Şş, Tt, Uu, Üü, Vv, Ww, Yy, Zz.

However, in 1995, the Uzbek and Karakalpak alphabets were revised. All letters with diacritics were excluded from them, and digraphs and post-letter apostrophes were introduced instead. The transition to a new script was to be carried out by 2005. The alphabet in the 1995 version looked like this: Aa, Aʻaʻ, Bb, Dd, Ee, Ff, Gg, Gʻgʻ, Hh, Xx, Iı, İi, Jj, Kk, Qq, Ll, Mm, Nn, Nʻnʻ, Oo, Oʻoʻ, Pp, Rr, Ss, Tt, Uu, Uʻuʻ, Vv, Ww, Yy, Zz, Sh sh.

In 2009, changes were made to this alphabet again. According to the law of the Republic of Karakalpakstan dated October 8, 2009, the letter combination ts was replaced by c. The letters e, o and oʻ at the beginning of the original Karakalpak words began to be written as ye, wo and woʻ, respectively. The letter I ı has been replaced by Iʻ iʻ. The digraph ch has been introduced. After the reform, the Karakalpak alphabet received the following form: A a, B b, C c, D d, E e, F f, G g, H h, I i, J j, K k, L l, M m, N n, O o, P p, Q q, R r, S s, T t, U u, V v, W w, X x, Y y, Z z, Aʻ aʻ, Oʻ oʻ, Iʻ iʻ, Uʻ uʻ, Gʻ gʻ, Nʻ nʻ, Sh sh, Ch ch.

The last changes to the new Karakalpak alphabet were made in 2016: instead of letters with apostrophes (Aʻ aʻ, Oʻ oʻ, Iʻ iʻ, Uʻ uʻ, Gʻ gʻ, Nʻ nʻ), letters with acutes were introduced (Á á, Ó ó, Í ı, Ú ú, Ǵ ǵ, Ń ń). This is the seventh version of the Latin alphabet in Karakalpak writing since 1928.

The current Latin alphabet is as follows:

A a	Á á	B b	D d	E e	F f	G g
Ǵ ɡ́	H h	X x	Í ı	I i	J j	K k
Q q	L l	M m	N n	Ń ń	O o	Ó ó
P p	R r	S s	T t	U u	Ú ú	V v
W w	Y y	Z z	Sh sh	C c	Ch ch

The Cyrillic, Latin, and Arabic alphabets are shown below with their equivalent representations in the IPA. Cyrillic letters with no direct equivalent in the Latin alphabet are shown in grey.

Latin					Cyrillic	Arabic	IPA
2016–	2009–2016	1995–2009	1994–1995	Çaꞑəlip	Cyrillic	Arabic	IPA
A a	A a				А а	ا / ‍ـا	/a/
Á á	Aʻ aʻ		Ä ä	Ə ə	Ә ә	ٴا / ‍ٴـا	/æ/
B b	B b			B ʙ	Б б	ب	/b/
D d	D d				Д д	د	/d/
E e	E e, Ye ye	E e			Е е	ٴىيـ / ە / ـە	/e/
F f	F f				Ф ф	ف	‌/f/
G g	G g				Г г	گ	‌ /ɡ/
Ǵ ǵ	Gʻ gʻ		Ğ ğ	Ƣ ƣ	Ғ ғ	غ	/ɣ/
H h	H h				Ҳ ҳ	ھ	‌ /h/
X x	X x				Х х	ح	‌/x/
Í ı	Iʻ iʻ	I ı		Ь ь	Ы ы	ىـ / ـىـ / ـ / ى	/ɯ/
I i	I i	İ i		I i	И и	ٴىـ / ٴـىـ / ٴـ / ٴى	/i/
J j	J j			Ç ç	Ж ж	ج	/ʒ/
K k	K k				К к	ك	/k/
Q q	Q q				Қ қ	ق	/q/
L l	L l				Л л	ل	/l/
M m	M m				М м	م	/m/
N n	N n				Н н	ن	/n/
Ń ń	Nʻ nʻ		Ñ ñ	Ꞑ ꞑ	Ң ң	ڭ	/ŋ/
O o	O o, Wo wo	O o			О о	ـو / و	/o/
Ó ó	Oʻ oʻ, Woʻ woʻ	Oʻ oʻ	Ö ö	Ɵ ɵ	Ө ө	ٴـو / ٴو	‌/œ/
P p	P p				П п	پ / ف	‌/p/
R r	R r				Р р	ر	‌/r/
S s	S s				С с	س	/s/
T t	T t				Т т	ت	/t/
U u	U u				У у	ـۇ / ۇ	/u/
Ú ú	Uʻ uʻ		Ü ü	Y y	Ү ү	ٴـۇ / ٴۇ	‌ /y/
V v	V v				В в	ۋ	/v/
W w	W w			V v	Ў ў	ۋ	/w/
Y y	Y y			J j	Й й	ي	/j/
Z z	Z z				З з	ز	/z/
Sh sh	Sh sh		Ş ş		Ш ш	ش	/ʃ/
C c	C c	Ts ts			Ц ц	تس	/ts/
Ch ch	Ch ch	Sh sh	Ş ş		Ч ч	چ	/tʃ/
yo	yo			jo	Ё ё	یو	/jo/
Sh sh	Sh sh		Ş ş		Щ щ	شش	/ʃtʃ/
—	—				Ъ ъ	—	—
—	—				Ь ь	—	—
E e	E e				Э э	ٴىيـ / ە / ـە	/e/
yu	yu			ju	Ю ю	يۇ	/ju/
ya	ya			ja	Я я	يا	‌/ja/

Before 2009, C was written as TS; I and Í were written as dotted and dotless I; and the letters with apostrophe are now letters with acute.

== Sample text ==
Article 1 of the Universal Declaration of Human Rights

Cyrillic text	Latin text	English translation
Барлық адамлар өз қәдир-қымбаты және ҳуқықларында еркин ҳәм тең болып туўылады. Оларға ақыл ҳәм ҳүждан берилген болып, бир-бирине туўысқанлық руўхындағы қатнаста болыўы тийис.	Barlıq adamlar óz qádir-qımbatı jáne huqıqlarında erkin hám teń bolıp tuwıladı. Olarǵa aqıl hám hújdan berilgen bolıp, bir-birine tuwısqanlıq ruwxındaǵı qatnasta bolıwı tiyis.	All human beings are born free and equal in dignity and rights. They are endowed with reason and conscience and should act towards one another in a spirit of brotherhood.

== Poets ==
- Ájiniyaz
- Berdaq Ǵarǵabay ulı
- Kúnxoja
- Ibrayim Yusupov

== See also ==
- Uzbekisation

== Bibliography ==
- Johanson, Lars; Csató, Éva Ágnes, eds. (1998), The Turkic Languages, London: Routledge, ISBN 9780415082006, OCLC 40980286
- Menges, Karl H. (1947), Qaraqałpaq Grammar, Translated from German by Leora P. Cunningham, New York: King's Crown Press, OCLC 3615928
