= List of geographic names of Iranian origin =

Countries that have English names, and settlement names, of Iranian origin Countries that have settlements with names of Iranian origin Countries that may have an Iranian root for their name

This is a list of geographic names of Iranian origin. This list also includes geographic names which are in part derived from Iranian languages.

== Africa ==
=== Somalia ===
Mogadishu
Bandar Beyla
Bandar Qaasim

=== Tanzania ===
Zanzibar

=== Tunisia ===
Kairouan
The name (ٱلْقَيْرُوَان Al-Qairuwân) is an Arabic deformation of the Persian word کاروان kârvân, meaning "military/civilian camp".

== Central Asia ==
Amudarya
Syrdarya
Khwarezm
Pamir Mountains
Turkistan
Formed with the Persian suffix -istan, literally meaning "land of the Turks" in Persian.

=== Afghanistan ===
Afghanistan

Formed with the Old Persian suffix -stan, cognate with sthāna from Sanskrit, meaning 'land', it literally means "Land of Afghans".

==== Cities ====
Herat
Jalalabad
Mazar-i Sharif

=== Kazakhstan ===
Formed with the Persian suffix -istan, literally meaning "land of the Kazakh or Ghazagh" in Persian.

==== Cities ====
Astana
Shymkent
Taraz
Lenger
Shardara

=== Kyrgyzstan ===
Formed with the Persian suffix -istan.

==== Cities ====
Jalal-Abad
Osh
Batken
Isfana
Uzgen
Aravan
Khaidarkan
Kadamjay
Nooken District

=== Tajikistan ===
Tajikistan
Tajik combined with Persian suffix -stan. Literally meaning "Land of Tajiks" in Persian.

==== Cities and regions ====
Dushanbe
The name is derived from the Persian word for "Monday" (du two + shamba or shanbe day, lit. "day two") and refers to the fact that it was a popular Monday marketplace.
Garm
The name is derived from the Gharmi people, and Iranian people.
Kofarnihon
The name comes from the Persian کافر نهان, literally meaning "place where unbelievers hide".
Murghab
Derived from the Persian word مرغاب meaning "river of the birds".
Panjakent
Persian پنج‌کند which means Five Cities. Its older name was Panj-deh (Five Villages). Kent or Kand is Iranian city or fortress. like Samarkand and Tashkand.
Qurghonteppa
Derived from the Persian word گرگان تپه meaning "Hills of Gurgan".

=== Turkmenistan ===
Ashgabat
The name is believed to derive from the Persian Ashk-ābād meaning "the City of Arsaces." Another explanation is that the name comes from the Arabic عشق (ishq, meaning "love") and the Persian آباد (ābād meaning "cultivated place" or "city"), and hence loosely translates as "the city of love."

==== Cities ====
Abadan
Chardzhou
Mary
Merv
Türkmenabat

=== Uzbekistan ===
Uzbekistan
Uzbek combined with Persian suffix -stan, originally from Sanskrit 'sthan' meaning 'land'. Literally meaning "Land of Uzbeks" in Persian.

==== Cities and regions ====
Afrasiab
Derived from the Persian afrāsiyāb (Persian: افراسياب; Avestan: Fraŋrasyan; Pahlavi: Frāsiyāv, Frāsiyāk and Freangrāsyāk), the name of the mythical King and hero of Turan and an archenemy of Iran.
Bukhara
Encyclopædia Iranica mentions that the name Bukhara is possibly derived from the Soghdian βuxārak. Another possible source of the name Bukhara may be from "a Turkic (Uighur) transfer of the Sanskrit word 'Vihara'" (monastery), and may be linked to the pre-Islamic presence of Buddhism (especially strong at the time of the Kushan empire) originating from the Indian sub-continent, and to the presence of some Turkish rulers in the 6th Century.
Dehkanabad
Formed with Persian suffix -abad.
Guliston
Formed with the Persian suffix -istan.
Jizzakh
The name "Jizzahk", derives from the Sogdian word for "small fort" and the present city is built of the site of the Sogdian town of Usrushana.
Karakalpakstan
Formed with the Persian suffix -istan.
Namangan and Namangan Province
Derived from the local salt mines (in Persian: نمک‌کان namak kan).
Panjakent
In Sogdian, the native local Iranian language in pre-Islamic times, kanθ means town, which is derived from Old Persian kanda, meaning a town or a region. In this case, Khanda has been manipulated into "kent".
Samarkand
The name Samarkand is derived from Persian meaning "Stone Town". In Greek it was known as Marakanda. In Sogdian, the native local Iranian language in pre-Islamic times, kanθ means town, which is derived from Old Persian kanda, meaning a town or a region.
Shahrisabz
Its name (شهر سبز/Šahr e Sabz) means "green city" in Persian.
Surxondaryo
Tashkent
In medieval times the town and the province were known as "Chach". Later, the town came to be known as Chachkand/Chashkand, meaning "Chach City." (Kand, qand, kent, kad, kath, kud—all meaning a city, are derived from the Old Iranian, kanda, meaning a town or a city.
Xorazm
Yarkand
In Sogdian, the native local Iranian language in pre-Islamic times, kanθ means town, which is derived from Old Persian kanda, meaning a town or a region.
Zeravshan
From the Persian word زر افشان, meaning "the sprayer of Gold".

==== Geographical features ====
Zeravshan mountains
From the Persian word زر افشان, meaning "the sprayer of Gold".

== East Asia ==
China
The English name of China comes from the Qin dynasty, possibly in a Sanskrit form; the pronunciation "China" came to the western languages through the Persian word چین "Chin".
Korea (both north and south)

After the Goryeo dynasty, the first Korean dynasty visited by Persian merchants who referred to Koryŏ (Goryeo) as Korea.

=== Brunei ===
Bandar Seri Begawan

=== Indonesia ===
Banda Aceh
The first part of its name comes from the Persian bandar (بندر) and means "port" or "haven". It is also proudly referred to as the "port to Meccah", as Islam first arrived in Aceh and spread throughout Southeast Asia.
Bandar Lampung
Bandar (in Persian بندر) is a Persian word meaning "port" and "haven". Etymologically it combines Persian بند Band (enclosed) and در dar (gate, door) meaning "an enclosed area" (i.e. protected from the sea). The word travelled with Persian sailors over a wide area leading to several coastal places in Iran and elsewhere having Bandar (haven) as part of their names.

=== Malaysia ===
Bandar Sri Damansara
Bandar Seri Putra
Bandar Baru Bangi
Bandar Samariang

== Southern Asia ==
=== Bangladesh ===
Bandar Upazila
Bandar Thana

=== India ===
India

The name India is derived from Indus, which is derived from the Old Persian word Hind. This is the name of the Indus River in Old Persian. The word Hindu also originates from the Old Persian, meaning people who live beyond the Indus River, and it originally referred to the people, not the religion.

Furthermore, the name "Hindustan", a name for historical India, is Persian derived.

Punjab

=== Pakistan ===
Pakistan
Formed from the Persian meaning "Land of the Pure"; "Pāk-" meaning "pure" and the Persian suffix "-istān" meaning "land"
Punjab
formed from Persian meaning "land of the five streams"; "Panj-" meaning "five" and "-āb" meaning "waters"

==== Cities ====
Keti Bandar
town in Pakistan formed by Persian word "Bandar"
Shamal Bandar
town in Pakistan formed by Persian word "Bandar"
Islamabad
capital of Pakistan formed by Persian word "-abad" meaning "city of Islam"
Peshawar
city in Pakistan formed from Old Persian "Pārāshavār" meaning "forward city"
Multan
city in Pakistan formed from Old Persian "mulastāna" meaning "frontier land"
Ziarat
town in Pakistan formed by Persian word "Ziarat" meaning "pilgrimage"
Hyderabad
city in Pakistan formed from Persian meaning "Lion city" referring to Ali
Muzaffarabad
city in Pakistan formed by Persian words meaning "city of the Victorious"
Bagh
town in Pakistan formed by the Persian word meaning "garden"
Mardan
city in Pakistan derived from Persian meaning "city of Men"
Khuzdar
town in Pakistan derived from Persian

Various cities and towns of South Asia ending in the Persian suffix -ābād (آباد).

== Europe ==
Caucasus
Danube River
Comes from the ancient Danuvius, Iranian *dānu, meaning "river" or "stream".
Dnieper
Sarmatian *danu apara "river to the rear"
Dniester
Sarmatian *danu nazdya "river to the front.
Don River (Russia)
Donetsk
Dnipro
Mount Elbrus
a metathesis of Alborz
Tiraspol
from an ancient name of the river, Tyras, derived from Scythian *tūra

=== Russia ===
Bashkortostan
Formed with the Persian suffix -istan.
Dagestan
Formed with the Persian suffix -istan.
Tatarstan
Formed with the Persian suffix -istan, literally meaning "Land of the Tartars" in Persian.
Mordovia
The name Mordva is thought to originate from an Iranian (Scythian) word, mard, meaning "man". The Mordvin word mirde denoting a husband or spouse is traced to the same origin. This word is also probably related to the final syllable of "Udmurt", and also in Komi: mort and perhaps even in Mari: marij.
Udmurtia
The name Udmurt comes from odo-mort ('meadow people'), where the first part represents the Permic root od or odo ('meadow, glade, turf, greenery'). This is supported by a document dated 1557, in which the Udmurts are referred to as lugovye lyudi ('meadow people'), alongside the traditional Russian name otyaki.

The second part murt means 'person' (cf. Komi mort, Mari mari). It is probably an early borrowing from a Scythian language: mertä or martiya ('person, man'; Sanskrit: Manus or Manushya), which is thought to have been borrowed from the Indo-Aryan term maryá- ('man, mortal, one who is bound to die'. cf. Old Indic márya ('young warrior') and marut ('chariot warrior'), both connected specifically with horses and chariots. The Indo-Europeanists T. Gamkrelidze and V. Ivanov associate this word with horse-riding Altaic tribes in the Bronze Age.

==== Cities ====
Derbent
The name is a Persian word (دربند Darband) meaning "barred gate", which came into use in the end of the 5th or the beginning of the 6th century AD, when the city was refounded by Kavadh I of the Sassanid dynasty of Persia.
Turan (town)
Samara
Named after the Samara River, which probably means "summer water" (signifying that it froze in winter) in the Indo-Iranian language which was spoken there around the third millennium BC. The Samara city gives its name to the Samara culture, a Neolithic culture of the fifth millennium BC, and the Kurgan hypothesis associates the region with the original homeland (urheimat) of the Proto-Indo-European language.

=== Bulgaria ===
Razgrad Province
Pazardzhik Province
Persian bāzār, "market" + the Turkic diminutive suffix -cık, "small".
Varna
possible Iranian etymology: var ("camp", "fortress")

=== Bosnia and Herzegovina ===
Sarajevo
from Persian سرای sarāy, "house, palace"

=== Romania ===
Iași
from the name of the Sarmatian tribe of Iazyges

=== Hungary ===
Jászság, Jászberény
(after the Jasz people from Sarmatia)

=== Serbia ===
Novi Pazar
Persian بازار (bāzār) 'market'

=== North Macedonia ===
Saraj, Skopje
Persian سرای (sarāy) 'house'

=== Croatia ===
Croatia
The name is most probably from Proto-Ossetian / Alanian *xurvæt- or *xurvāt-, in the meaning of "one who guards" ("guardian, protector").

== Caucasus ==
Arran
Caucasus
Kura River
The name Kura is taken from the name Kurosh which is the Persian pronunciation of the name of the Persian king Cyrus the Great.

=== Armenia ===
Armenia

The exonym Armenia is attested in the Old Persian Behistun inscription as Armina, and introduced into Greek by Herodotus as Ἀρμένιοι "Armenians", who in his review of the troops opposing the Greeks wrote that "the Armenians were armed like the Phrygians, being Phrygian colonists.". Armenia Ἀρμενία as the name for the country of the Armenians is in use since Strabo. The ultimate origin of the exonym is also uncertain, but it may well be connected to an Assyrian toponym Armanî or Armânum, first recorded by Naram-Sin in the 23rd century BC as the name of an Akkadian colony in the Diyarbakır region.

Artavaz

==== Cities and regions ====
Dvin
The word is of Persian origin, and means hill.
Hrazdan
The name Hrazdan is derived from the Middle-Persian name Frazdan. Farzdan is connected to the Zoroastrian mythology.
Sardarabad
Spitak
Zangezur

=== Azerbaijan ===
Azerbaijan

The Republic of Azerbaijan gets its name from the Iranian region known as Azerbaijan. The name Azerbaijan is thought to be derived from Atropates, the Satrap (governor) of Media in the Achaemenid empire, who ruled a region found in modern Iranian Azarbaijan called Atropatene. Atropates name is believed to be derived from the Old Persian roots meaning "protected by fire." The name is also mentioned in the Avestan Frawardin Yasht: âterepâtahe ashaonô fravashîm ýazamaide which translates literally to: We worship the Fravashi of the holy Atare-pata.

==== Cities and regions ====
Absheron Rayon
Astara and Astara (rayon)
There are two main theories for the etymology of the city's name. One is that it is derived from the Persian or Talysh word آهسته رو (Aste-ro or Aheste-ro), meaning "the place where the travel gets slower" (given the marshlands that surrounded the region before). . The oldest theory comes from Vedic songs and writings which explains Astara as a place where the rays of lights shine from behind to light the pathways ahead.
Babək rayon
Named after the Iranian hero Babak Khorramdin
Baku
The name Baku is widely believed to be derived from the old Persian names of the city Bad-kube, meaning "city where the wind blows", or Baghkuh, meaning "Mount of God". Arabic sources refer the city as Baku, Bakukh, Bakuya, and Bakuye, all of which seem to come from the original Persian name. Other theories suggest that the name dates back to Zoroastrianism and comes from the word Baga meaning "the god" in Avestan and Sanskrit.
Barda
The name of the town derives from Old Armenian Partaw (Պարտաւ), itself from Iranian *pari-tāva- 'rampart', from *pari- 'around' and *tā̆v- 'to throw; to heap up'.
Beylagan
The 5th century Armenian historian Moses of Chorene states that this name is from the Persian name Payda-gharan (پایداقاران), that its meaning is not clear, but that "-an" in the last section means "place of" in Persian.
Bilasuvar
It has been said that the ancient name was Pileh-Swar that in Persian means "the elephant-riding person ", named after one of the Buyid dynasty amirs.
Ganja
The name comes from the New Persian ganj (گنج: "treasure, treasury"), which itself is from the Middle Persian Ganjak of the same meaning.
Hadrut
Kalbajar
Karabakh
The word "Karabakh" originated from Turkic and Persian, literally meaning "black garden." The name first appears in Georgian and Persian sources in the 13th and 14th centuries. The term Nagorno-Karabakh is a derivative that refers to the mountainous part of Karabakh (the Russian word нагорный – nagorny means "mountainous", "upland").
Nakhchivan Autonomous Republic and Nakhchivan City
According to some, the name Nakhchivan derived from the Persian Nagsh-e-Jahan ("Image of the World"), a reference to the beauty of the area.
Nardaran
from the Persian Nar (Pomegranate)نار + Daran (trees) داران "Place with Pomegranate trees".
Ordubad
Sadarak
Shaki and Shaki (rayon)
According to the Azerbaijan Development Gateway, the name of the town goes back to the ethnonym of the Sakas, who reached the territory of modern-day Azerbaijan in the 7th century B.C. and populated it for several centuries. In the medieval sources, the name of the town is found in various forms such as Sheke, Sheki, Shaka, Shakki, Shakne, Shaken, Shakkan, Shekin.
Shirvan
Literally meaning "Land of the Lions" in Persian.
Shusha
Literally means "glass" and derives from New Persian Shīsha ("glass, vessel, bottle, flask").
Siazan
The word Siyazan derives from the Tat words siya ("black") and zan ("woman").
Surakhani
Xirdalan
Zangilan
Zardab
Zardab is a Persian word (زردآب Zardab) meaning "yellow water".
Zərgəran
Zərnava

==== Geographic features ====
Absheron
The name Abşeron is Persian and comes from the Persian word Abshuran (آبشوران) meaning "The place of the Salty Waters".

=== Georgia ===
Georgia
The word "Georgia" ultimately derives from the Persian word gurğ/gurğān ("wolf").

==== Cities ====
Gardabani
Gurjaani
Baghdati

== Middle East ==
Persian Gulf
Derived from Persia.
Strait of Hormuz
There are two opinions about the etymology of this name. In popular belief the derivation is from the name of the Persian God هرمز Hormoz (a variant of Ahura Mazda). Compare the Pillars of Hercules at the entrance to the Mediterranean. Scholars, historians and linguists derive the name "Ormuz" from the local Persian word هورمغ Hur-mogh meaning datepalm. In the local dialects of Hurmoz and Minab this strait is still called Hurmogh and has the aforementioned meaning.
Arvandrud
The Iranian name of the Shatt al-Arab, from the Persian اروندرود, literally Arvand River.

=== Iran ===
Iran

==== Cities ====
Abadan
An Iranian etymology of the name (from the Persian word "ab" (water) and the root "pā" (guard, watch) thus "coastguard station"), was suggested by B. Farahvashi. Supporting evidence is the name "Apphana" which Ptolemy applies to an island off the mouth of the Tigris. The Persian version of the name had begun to come into general use before it was adopted by official decree in 1935. The geographer Marcian also renders the name "Apphadana" in his writings.
Ahvaz
The word Ahvaz is a Persianized form of the local Arabic Ahwaz, which in turn itself is derived from a Persian word. The Dehkhoda Dictionary specifically defines the Arabic "Suq-al-Ahwaz" as "Market of the Khuzis", where "Suq" is Arabic for market, and "Ahwaz" is a plural (اسم جمع) of the form "af'āl" (افعال) of the word "Huz", or more precisely, the Arabic root "ha wa za" (ه و ز), which itself comes from the Persian Huz, from Achaemenid inscriptions from where the term first appears. Thus, "Ahwaz" in Arabic means "the Huz-i people", which refers to the non-Arabic original inhabitants of Khūzestān.
Aligoodarz
The city of Aligoodarz was once called Al-e Goodarz meaning "sons or tribe of Goodarz", a mythical Iranian hero from the Persian national epic Shahnameh.
Amol
Many scholars believe that the city's name is rooted in the word Amard (Amui in Pahlavi).
Ardabil
The name Ardabil comes from the Zoroastrian name of "Artavil" (mentioned in Avesta) which means a holy place.
Ardakan
The word "Ardakan" in Persian means "holy place" or "clean place" (Modern Persian: ardak+an / Middle Persian: artak+an)
Astara
The city's name is derived from the Persian word آهسته‌رو (Aste-ro or Aheste-ro), meaning "the place where the travel gets slower" (given the marshlands that surrounded the region before). .

==== Islands ====
Farsi Island
Arabized name derived from Parsi (Persian).
Greater and Lesser Tunbs
The name of the islands comes from Persian tunb 'hilly place'.
Hendurabi
Derived from the Persian word اندرآبی Andar-abi meaning "Inside the waters".
Hormuz Island
Name of Shah Hormuz
Shetor Island
Shetor or Shotor (Persian: شتور) in Persian means Camel.

=== Iraq ===
Iraq
Possibly derived from the Middle Persian word Erak, meaning "lowlands". The natives of the southwestern part of today's Iran called their land the "Persian Iraq" (Iraq Ajami) for many centuries. Before the constitution of the state of Iraq, the term "Arab Iraq" (Iraq Arabi) referred to the region around Baghdad and Basra.

==== Cities and regions ====
Anbar
Baghdad
Bahdinan
Barzan
Basra
Ctesiphon
Al Diwaniyah
Dohuk
Khanaqin
Salman Pak

=== Lebanon ===
Kisrawan

=== Oman ===
Bandar Khayran
Bandar Jissah

=== Turkey ===
Adapazarı
Aksaray
Akşehir
Alaşehir
Cappadocia
Eceabat
Erzincan
Eskişehir
Galatasaray {Istanbul}
Gümüşhane
Kahramanmaraş
Nevşehir
Pazar

=== United Arab Emirates ===
Ajman
Dubai
Some believe that the name of the city as Persian roots, possibly from the Persian words do (two) and baradar brother), referring to Diera and Bur Dubai.
Sharjah

=== Yemen ===
Zinjibar

== North America ==
Persia, Iowa, Persia, New York, and Persia, California
Persia derives from the ancient Greek name for Iran's maritime province, called Fars in the modern Persian language, Pars in Middle Persian and Pārsa (𐎱𐎠𐎼𐎿) in Old Persian. Persis is the Hellenized form of Pars, and through that came the Latinized word Persia.

== See also ==
- List of country name etymologies
- List of English words of Persian origin
- Iranian languages
- Iranian peoples

== Sources ==
- Chaumont, M. L. (1986). "ARMENIA AND IRAN ii. The pre-Islamic period". Encyclopaedia Iranica, Vol. II, Fasc. 4. pp. 418–438.
