= 1991 Navoiy Aeroflot Antonov An-24 crash =

1991 aviation accident in the Soviet Union

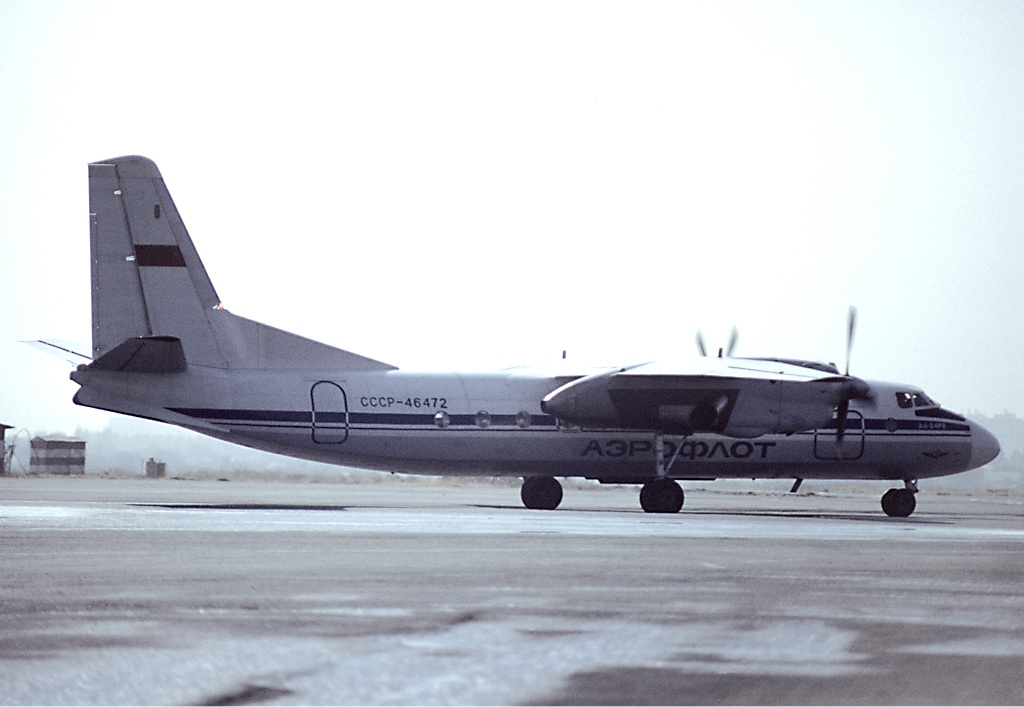
- CCCP-46472, aircraft involved the accident, pictured in 1988

Accident
- Date: 23 March 1991
- Summary: Runway overrun
- Site: Navoiy International Airport, Navoiy, Uzbek SSR, Soviet Union

Aircraft
- Aircraft type: Antonov An-24RV
- Operator: Aeroflot
- Registration: CCCP-46472
- Flight origin: Tashkent-Yuzhny Airport, Tashkent, Uzbekistan, USSR
- Destination: Navoiy International Airport, Navoiy, Uzbekistan, USSR
- Occupants: 63
- Passengers: 59
- Crew: 4
- Fatalities: 34
- Survivors: 29

On 23 March, 1991, an An-24RV belonging to Aeroflot crashed during landing at Navoiy Airport in Tashkent, Uzbekistan. A total of 34 people died.

== Airplane ==
The An-24 aircraft with serial number 27307910 was produced in July 1972 by Antonov plant under serial number 079-10. It was handed over to the Ministry of Civil Aviation of the USSR under registration number CCCP-46472. It was sent to the Samarkand United Detachment of the Civil Aviation Administration of Uzbekistan until August 18.

== Crash ==
The plane was flying from Tashkent to Navoiy with 4 crew members and 59 passengers.

On approach, the crew did not follow the landing pattern and gave false information to the controller, stating that they were following the controller's orders. As a result, the aircraft was at an altitude of 3,000 meters when it was 19 kilometers from the runway. The crew reported that it was at an altitude of 2,100 meters, 23 kilometers from the runway. Unaware of the actual situation, the controller allowed them to descend to 1,500 meters, after which the pilot brought the aircraft into a steep descent at a vertical speed of 20 m/s, while airspeed increased up to 450 km / h. At 2,400 meters, 18 kilometers from the runway, the pilots reported that they were at 1,500 meters and were making an approach. In response, the controller cleared them to descend to 600 meters in the third turn, so the crew turned 29° to the right, then left, entering a 252° landing course. Following a wrong approach configuration, the crew passed over the runway threshold at a height of 30 meters and an excessive speed of 350 km/h. Rather than initiating a go-around procedure, the pilot-in-command continued and the aircraft landed 710 meters past the runway threshold. Unable to stop within the remaining distance, the aircraft overran at a speed of 225 km/h, lost its undercarriage then slid for about 317 meters and eventually collided with concrete blocks (2 meters high), bursting into flames. 29 passengers were injured while 34 other occupants were killed, among them all four crew members.
