= Tinchlik =

Tinchlik may refer to the following places in Uzbekistan:

- Tinchlik, Fergana Region, a city in Fergana Region
- Tinchlik, Navoiy, a town in Navoiy Region
- Tinchlik (Tashkent Metro), a metro station in Tashkent
