= List of cities in Uzbekistan =

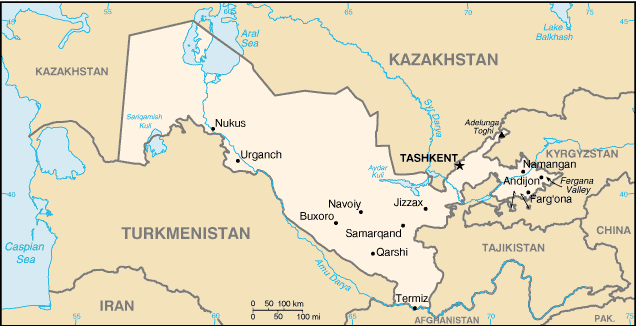
Map of Uzbekistan

As of 2021, Uzbekistan has 120 cities (shahar) and 1,067 urban-type settlements (shaharcha).

== List ==
List of cities with population more than 100,000 in 2025.

Rank	City	Population (2024)	Reference	Image
1	Tashkent	3,120,000		
2	Samarkand	882,000		
3	Namangan	713,500		
4	Andijan	492,190		
5	Nukus	345,000		
6	Fergana	328,000		
7	Kokand	314,000		
8	Qarshi	301,000		
9	Bukhara	300,000		
10	Margilan	258,000		
11	Termez	207,000		
12	Jizzakh	200,600		
13	Angren	185,000		
14	Chirchiq	175,000		
15	Navoiy	166,900		
16	Urgench	156,000		
17	Olmaliq	150,000		
18	Shahrisabz	149,000		
19	Bekobod	106,000		

== See also ==
- Category:Cities in Uzbekistan
- List of renamed cities in Uzbekistan
- List of geographic names of Iranian origin
- Lists of cities
