= Müşkəmir =

- Location within Azerbaijan
- Coordinates: 40°49′N 48°20′E
- Country: Azerbaijan
- Rayon: Ismailli
- Municipality: Zərnava
- Time zone: UTC+4 (AZT)
  - Summer (DST): UTC+5 (AZT)

Müşkəmir (also, Mushkemir and Myushkyamir) is a village in the Ismailli Rayon of Azerbaijan. The village forms part of the municipality of Zərnava.
