= Aşağı Zərnav =

Coordinates: 40.6205°N 48.15367°E

Aşağı Zərnav is a village in the municipality of Zərnava in the Ismailli Rayon of Azerbaijan.
