= Adventist Church (Navoiy) =

Church in Navoiy Region, Uzbekistan

- Seventh-day Adventist Christian Church
- Христианская церковь адвентистов седьмого дня
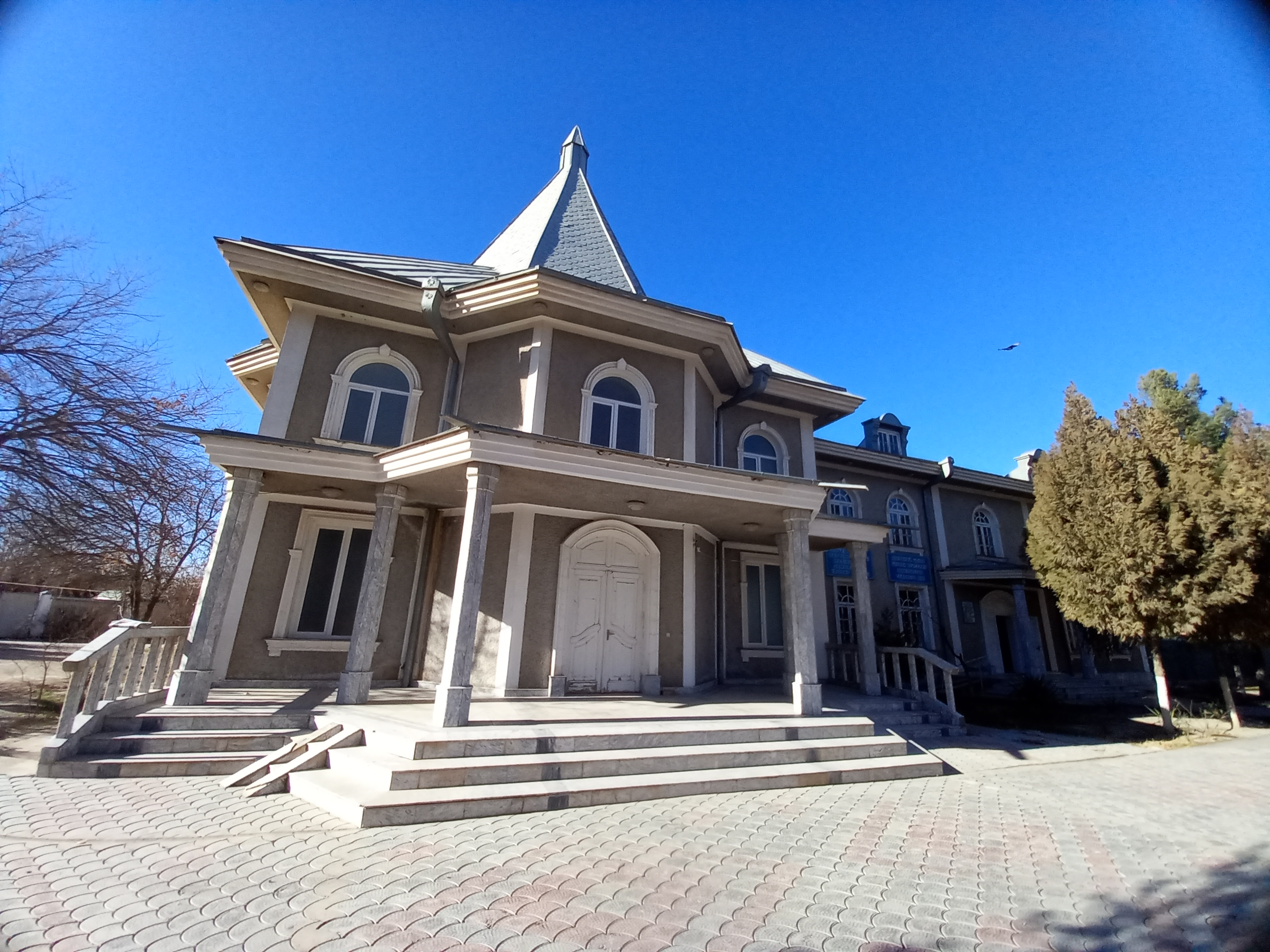
- Seventh-day Adventist Christian Church in Navoi
- Adventist Church
- Location: Navoi region, Navoi city, DUSTLIGI STREET, HOUSE 46, APARTMENT 29
- Country: Uzbekistan
- Denomination: Christian church

History
- Status: Church

Architecture
- Years built: 1996-2001

Adventist Church (other names: Seventh-day Adventist Church, in Russian, Христианская церковь адвентистов седьмого дня) is the first and only Seventh-day Adventist church in the city of Navoi. It was built between 1996 and 2001 and is located on Navoi Street in the city of Navoiy.

== History ==
In 1995, a plot of land measuring 0.4 hectares was allocated from the southern-western part of the suburban area of Navoi city, where the construction of a church for the Seventh-day Adventist Christian community was planned.

The construction of the church began in 1996. The project for the Adventist Church was prepared by the Samarkand architect Ali Sodiqov, and he personally led the construction. The first Adventist community in Tashkent was organized in 1910. There are a total of 10 Seventh-day Adventist churches in Uzbekistan. On August 26, 1976, the Adventist community in Tashkent was officially registered for the first time.

The construction was completed in 2001, and it was commissioned for use during the celebration of the 10th anniversary of Uzbekistan's independence.

== Architecture ==
The building is a comprehensive complex, including a worship hall, library, classrooms, meeting rooms, auditoriums, and a courtyard with a sacred water reservoir capable of accommodating 150 to 200 people.

== Gallery ==
Gallery

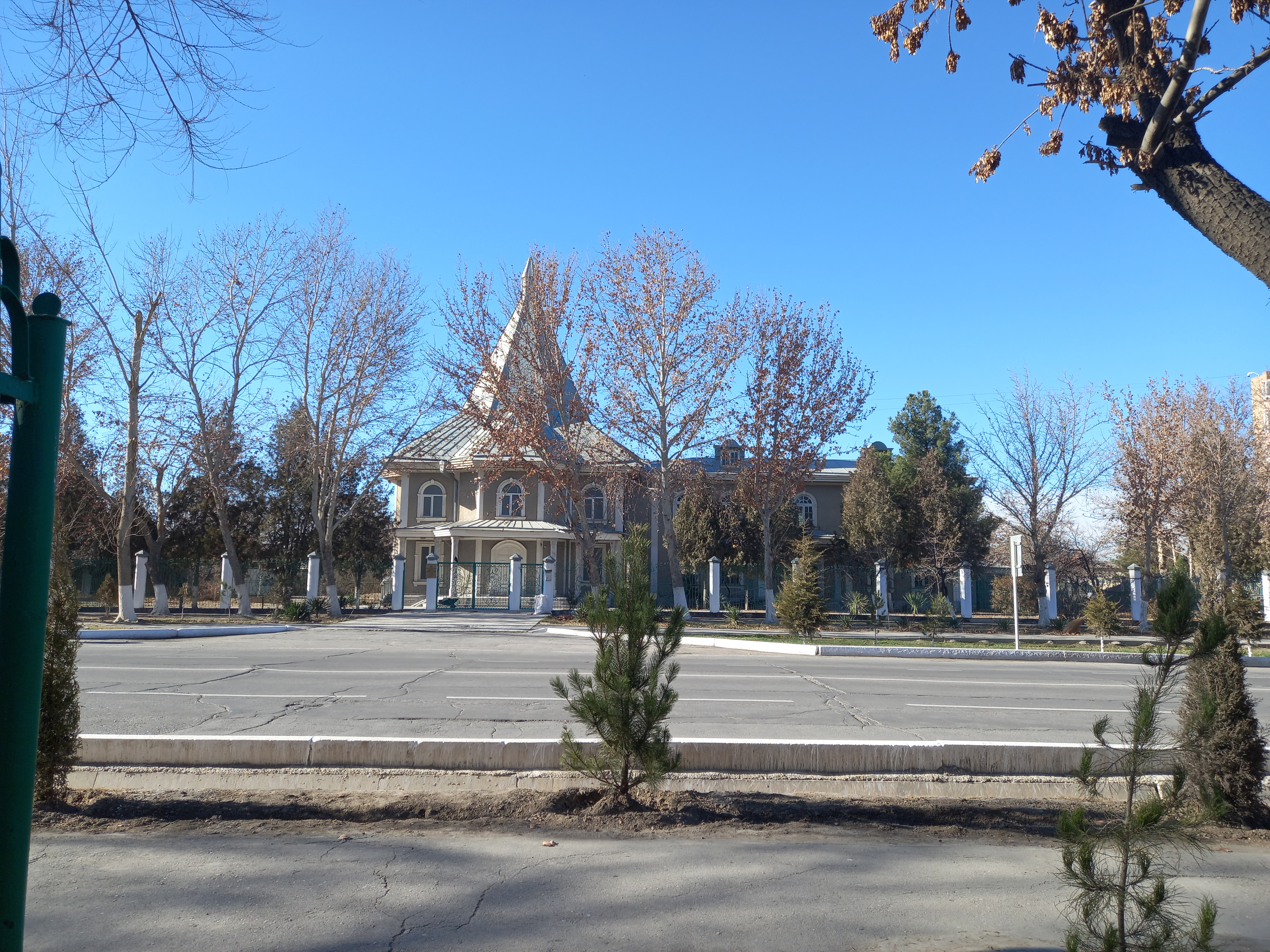
Seventh-day Adventist Christian Church in Navoi.

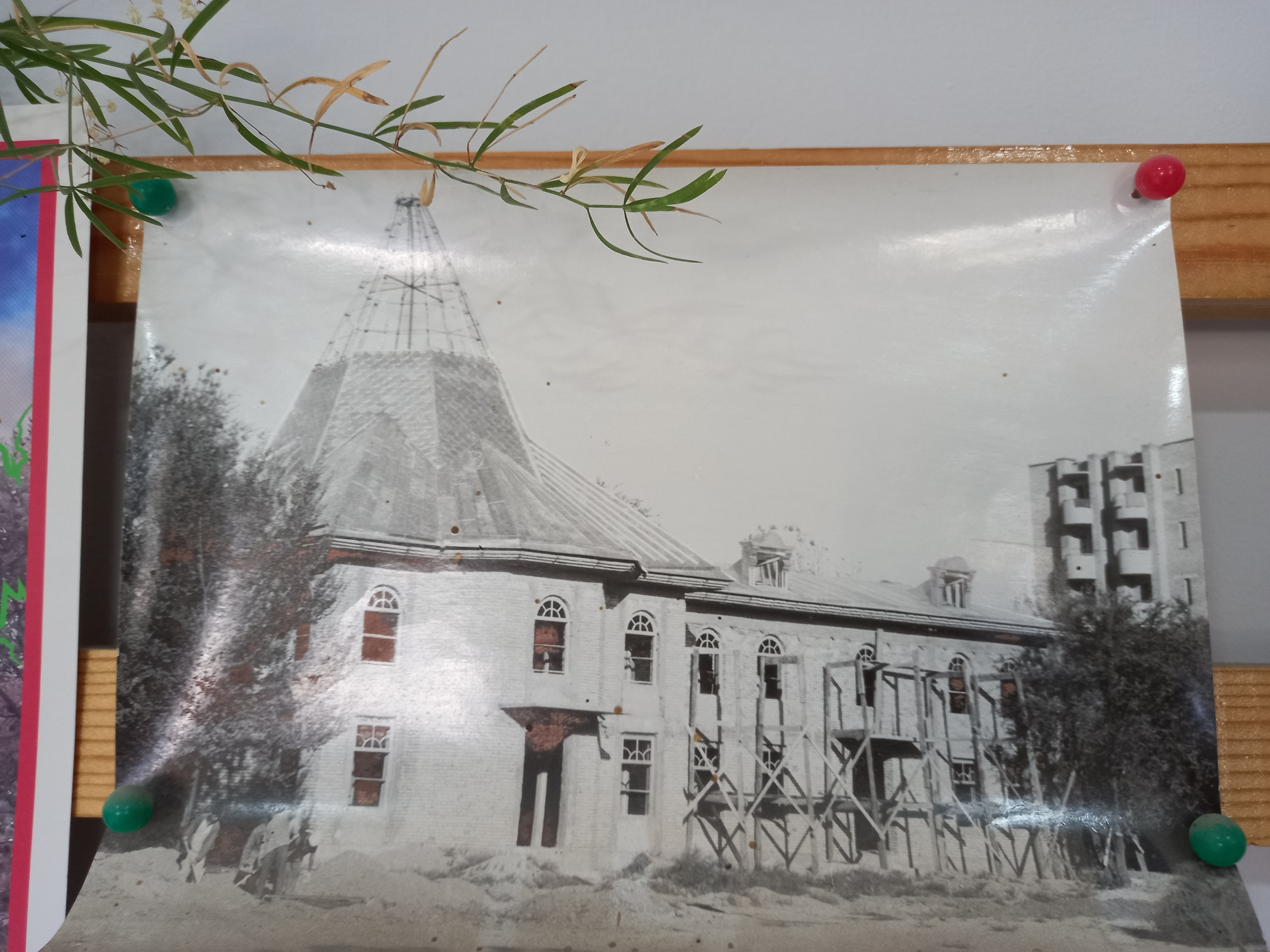
Seventh-day Adventist Christian Church in Navoi.

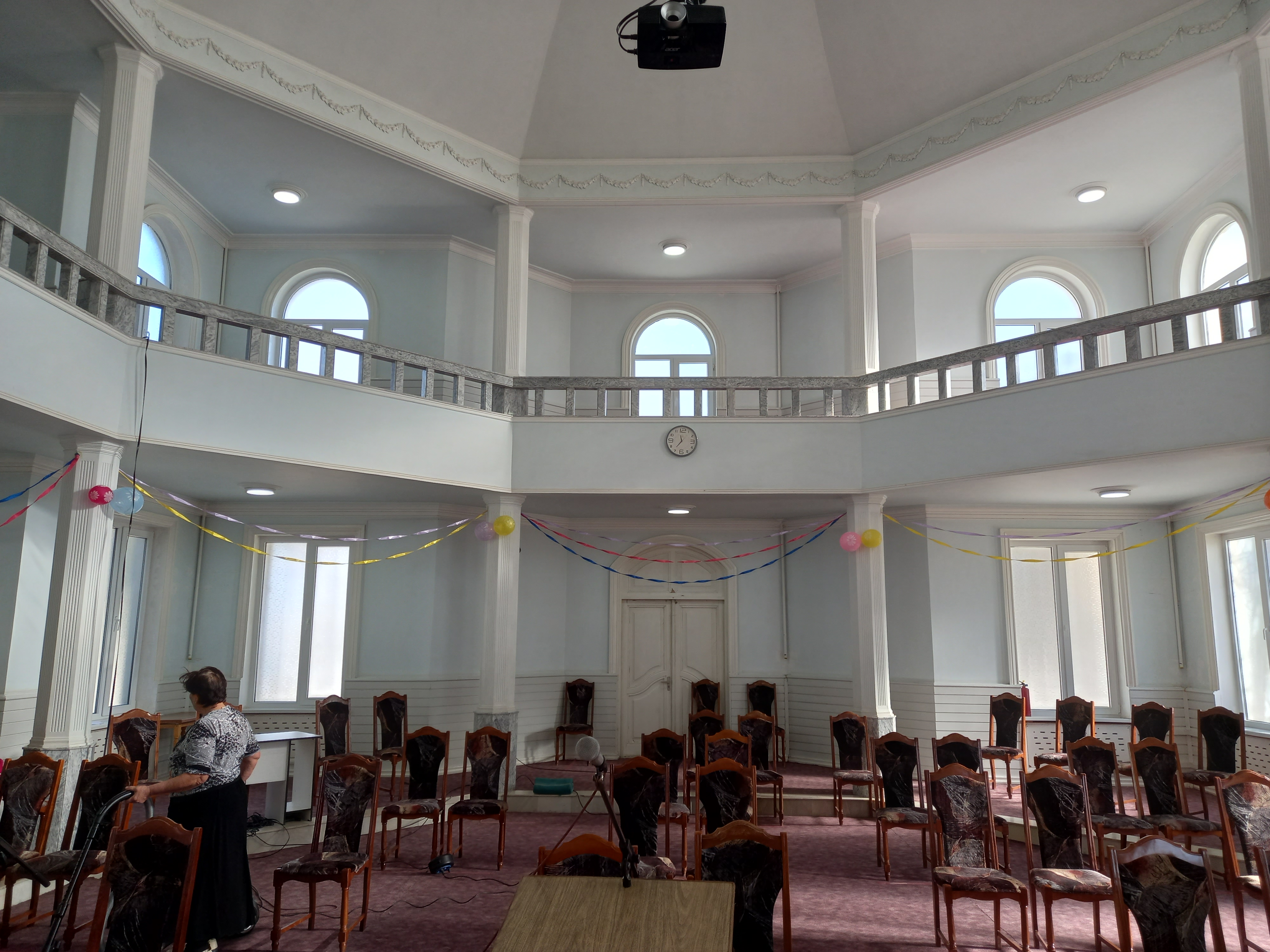
Interior view of the church

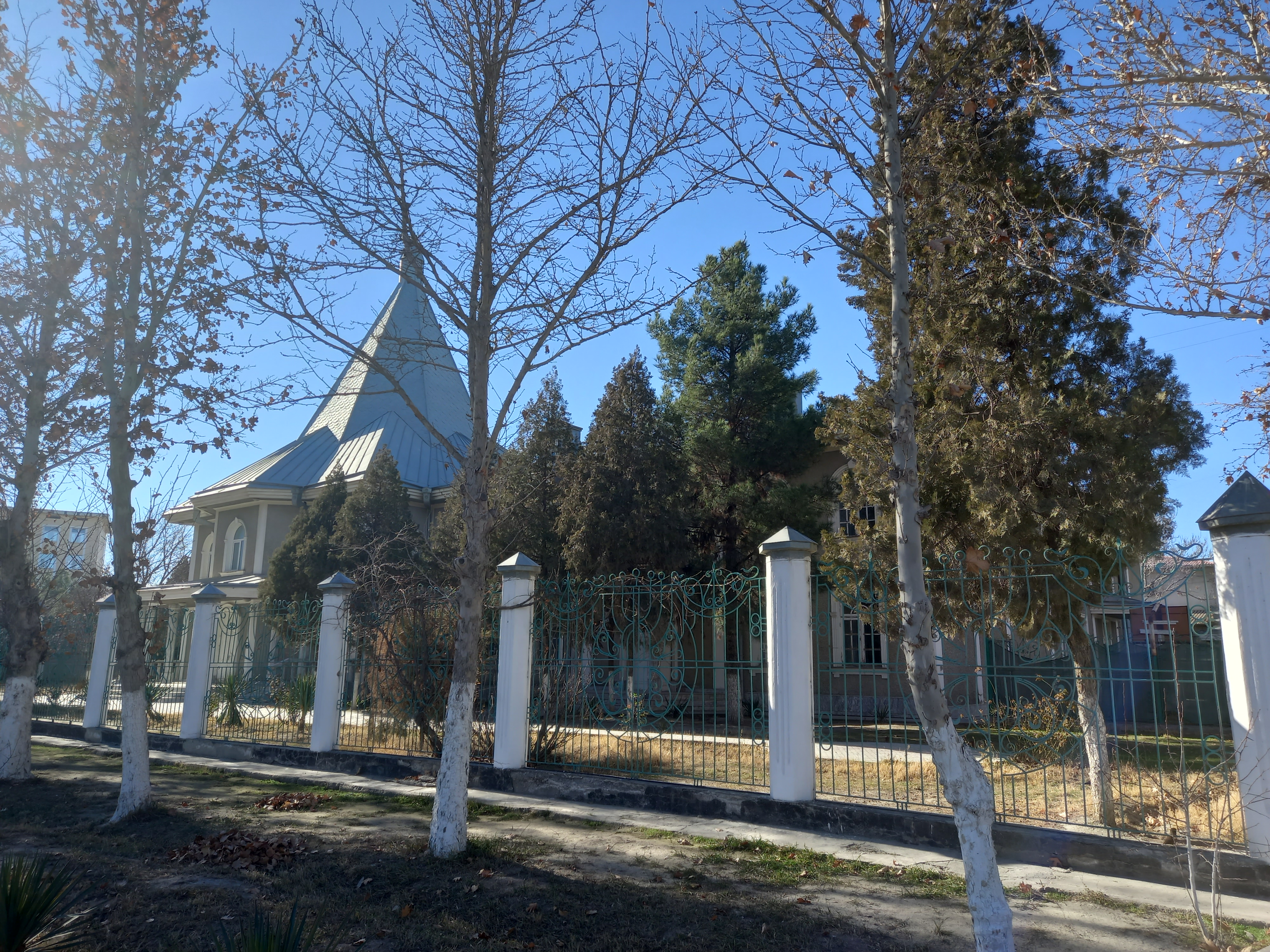
Seventh-day Adventist Church in Navoi

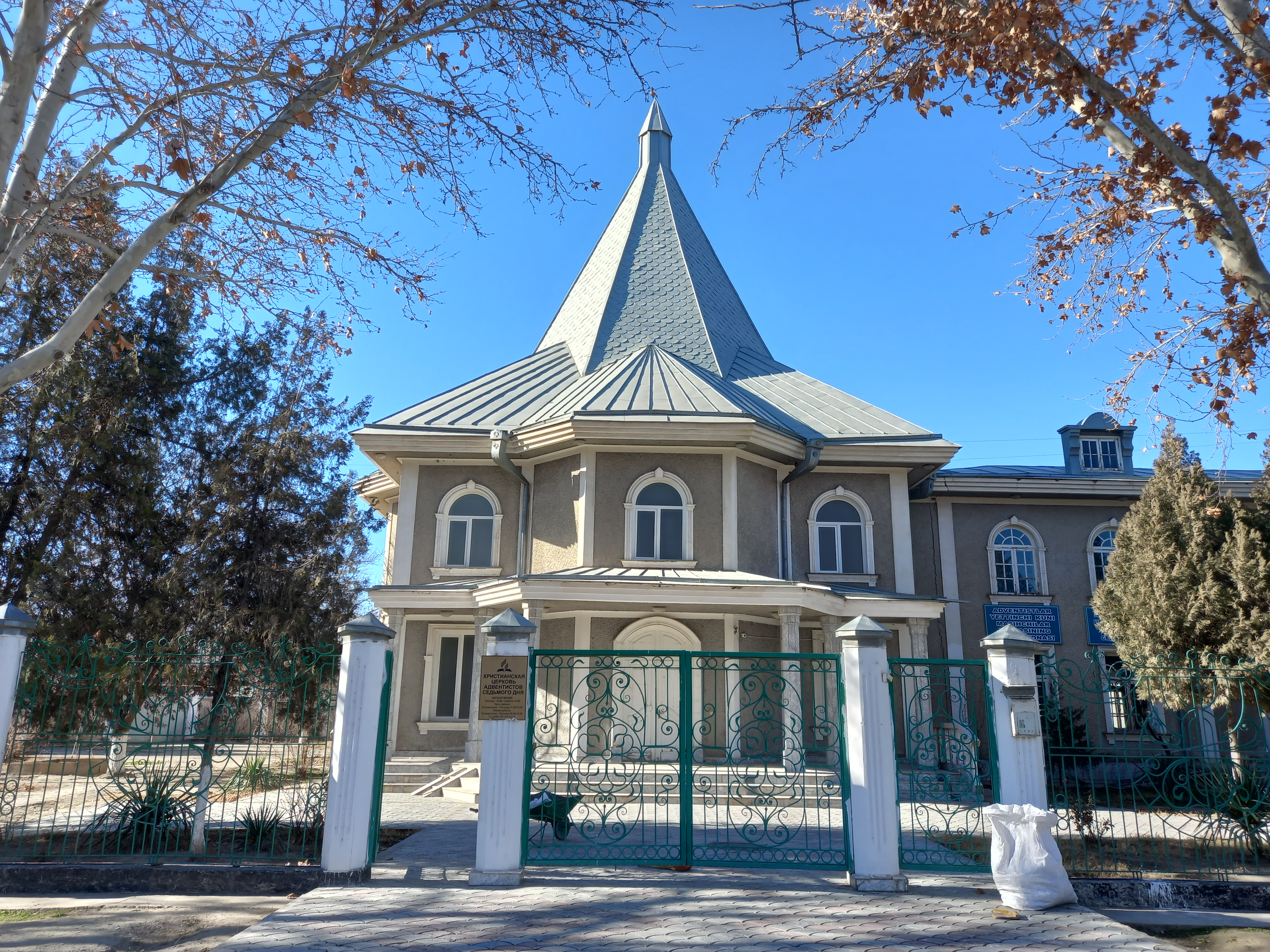
View of the church from the entrance

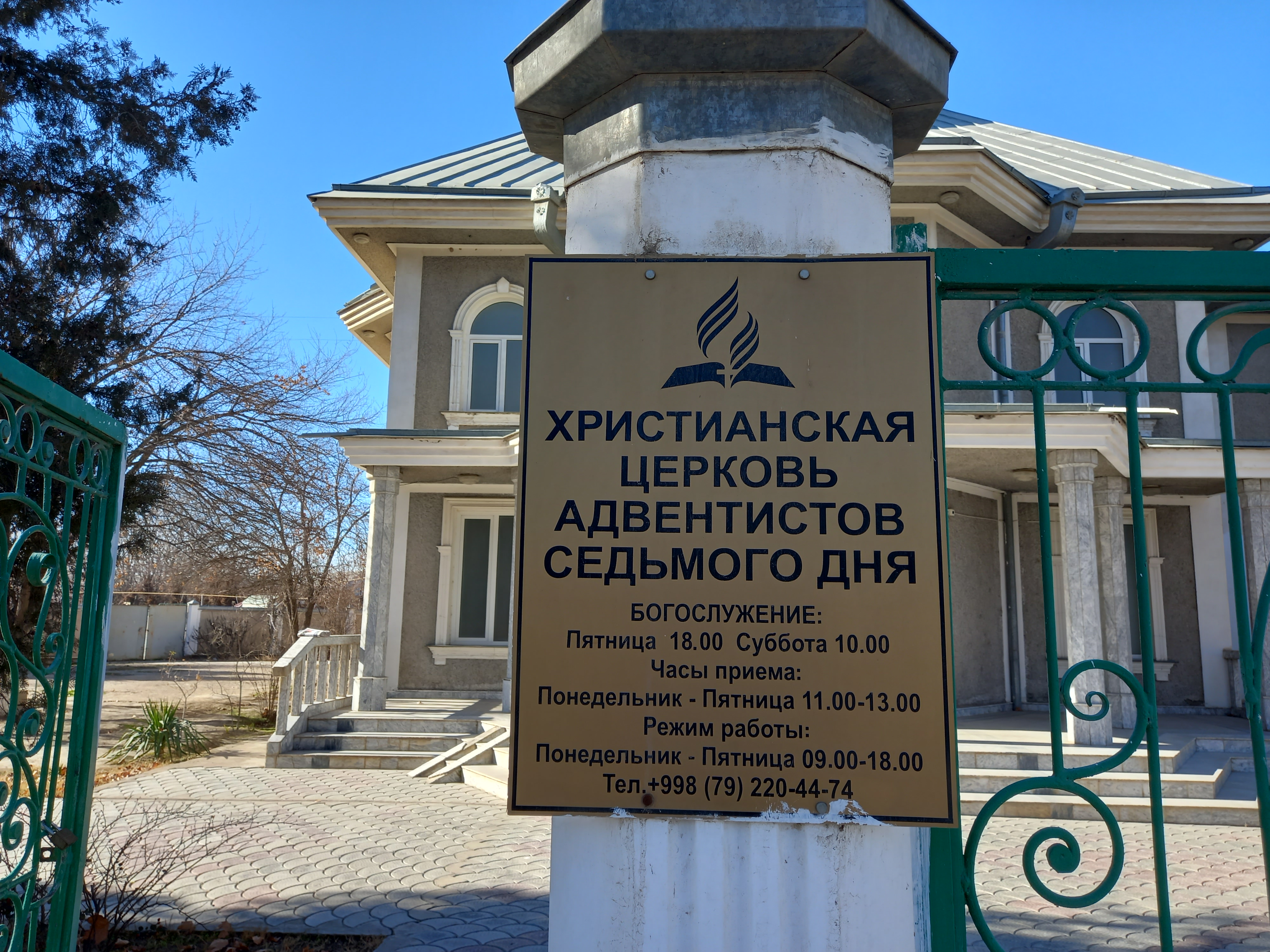
Information board at the entrance of the church

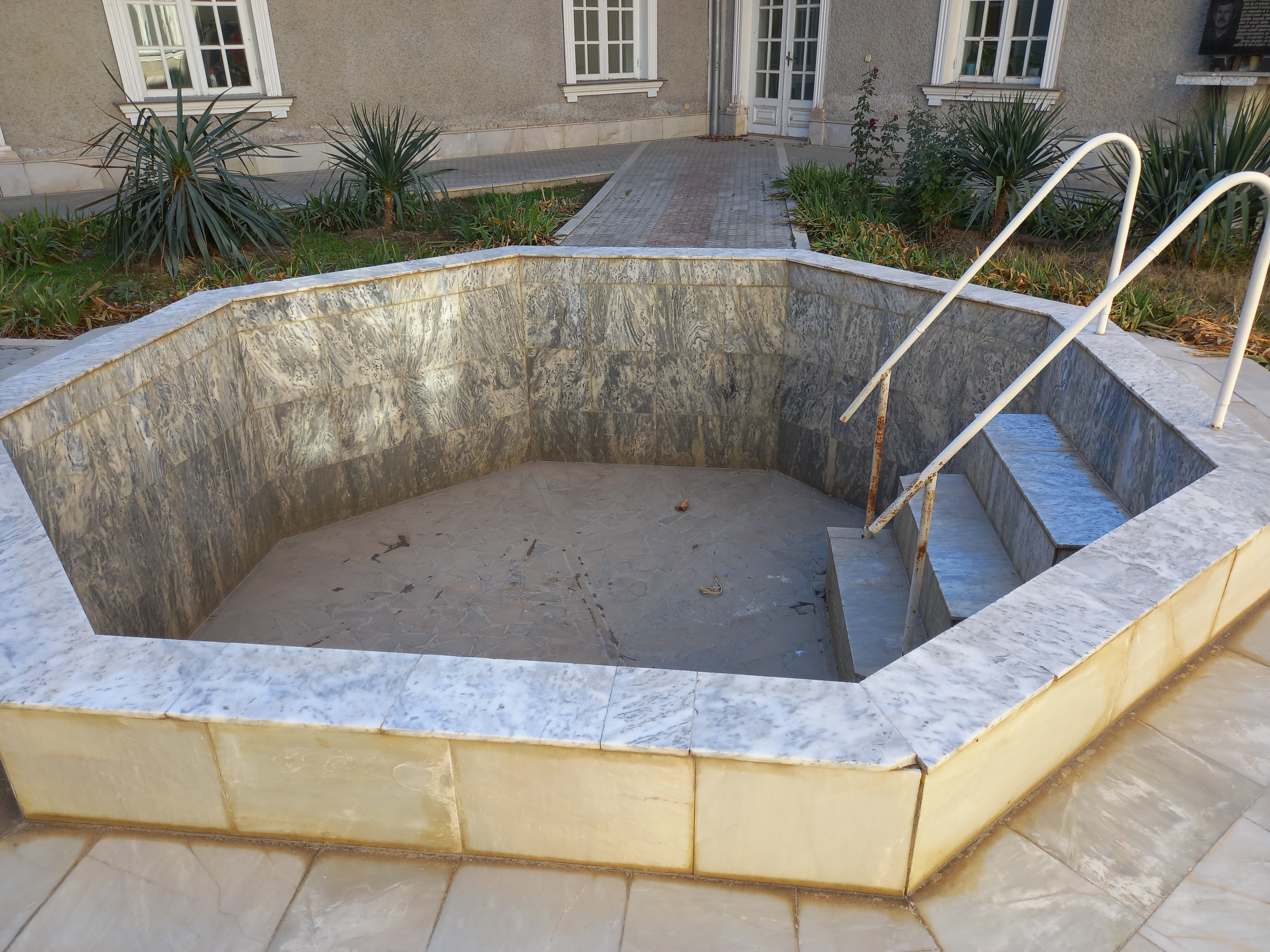
A pool of holy water in the center of the inner courtyard of the church

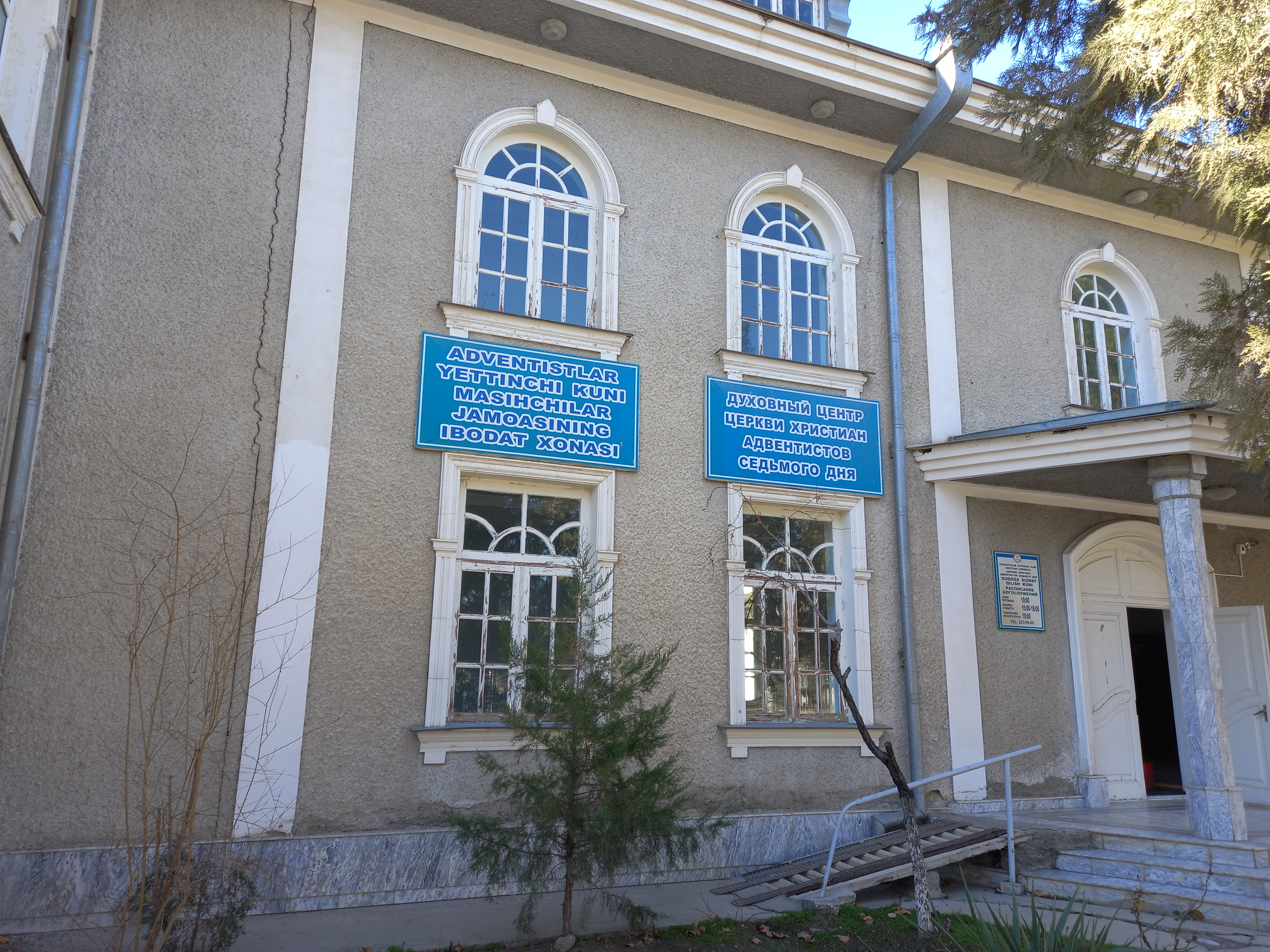
Reference books in Uzbek and Russian languages hung on the church wall

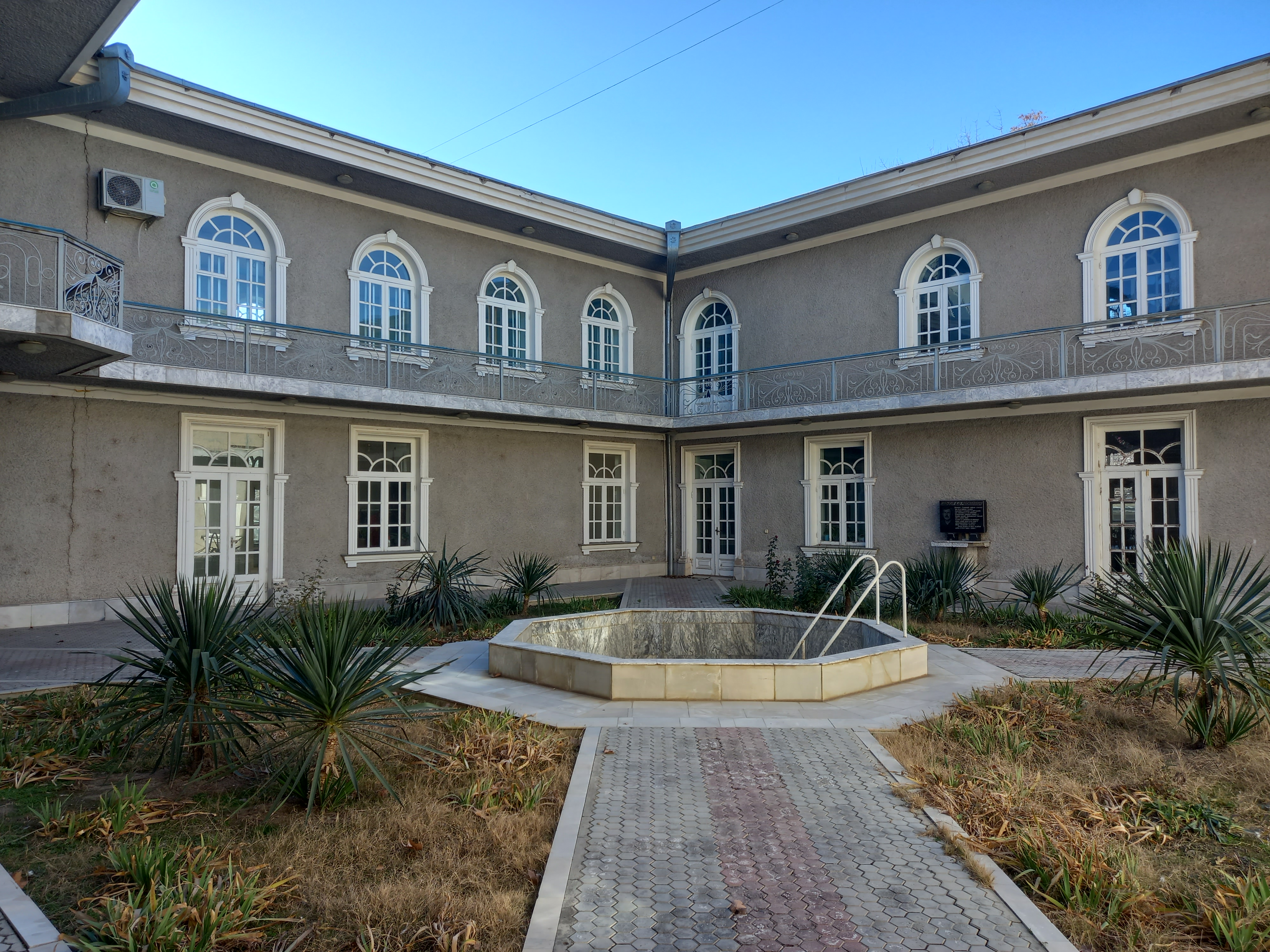
Inner courtyard of the church
