= Suraxanı =

Suraxanı or Surakhany may refer to:

- Suraxanı raion, an administrative district in Baku, Azerbaijan
  - Suraxanı (town), the administrative center of the raion
- Suraxanı, Agsu, a village and municipality in Agsu Rayon, Azerbaijan
