= Navoi International Airport =

Navoiy International Airport Navoiy Xalqaro Aeroporti
- IATA: NVI; ICAO: UZSA

Summary
- Airport type: Public
- Owner: Government of Uzbekistan
- Operator: Uzbekistan Airways
- Serves: Navoiy
- Location: Navoiy, Uzbekistan
- Elevation AMSL: 1,140 ft (350 m)
- Coordinates: 40°07′04″N 065°10′30″E

Map
- Location of air base in Uzbekistan

Runways
Direction	Length		Surface
Direction	m	ft	Surface
07/25	4,000	13,123	Concrete

Navoiy International Airport (IATA: NVI, ICAO: UZSA) is an airport of entry in Navoiy, Uzbekistan.

== History ==
Uzbekistan Airways started cargo operation based in Navoiy hub in May 2009 and now operates 18 weekly flights to Bangkok, Delhi, Mumbai and Frankfurt. Navoiy Airport now serves 3 airlines flying to 9 cities in 8 countries including passenger flights and the work is underway to create business links with new airlines and set up new routes.

== Airlines and destinations ==
=== Passenger ===
Airlines	Destinations
azimuth	Moscow-Vnukovo
Silk Avia	Fergana, Tashkent
Uzbekistan Airways	Moscow–Vnukovo

== See also ==
- List of the busiest airports in the former USSR
- Transportation in Uzbekistan
