= Tinchlik, Navoiy =

Tinchlik
- urban-type settlement
- Location in Uzbekistan
- Coordinates: 40°05′20″N 65°19′12″E
- Country: Uzbekistan
- Region: Navoiy Region
- City: Navoiy
- Urban-type settlement status: 1978

Population (1989)
  - Total: 2,424
- Time zone: UTC+5 (UZT)

Tinchlik (Uzbek: Tinchlik/Тинчлик, Russian: Тинчлик) is an urban-type settlement in Navoiy Region, Uzbekistan. Administratively, it is part of the city Navoiy. The population in 1989 was 2424 people.
