= Surxondaryo =

Surxondaryo or Surkhandarya may refer to:

- Surxondaryo (river), a river in Uzbekistan
- Surxondaryo Region, an administrative region of Uzbekistan
