= Zərnava =

- Municipality
- Location within Azerbaijan
- Coordinates: 40°48′10″N 48°20′55″E
- Country: Azerbaijan
- Rayon: Ismailli
- Elevation: 1,327 m (4,354 ft)

Population
  - Total: 872
- Time zone: UTC+4 (AZT)
  - Summer (DST): UTC+5 (AZT)

Zərnava (also, Zarnova) is a village and municipality in the Ismailli Rayon of Azerbaijan. It has a population of 872. The municipality consists of the villages of Zərnava, Aşağı Zərnav, and Müşkəmir.
