= Sadarak =

Sadarak may refer to:

- Sadarak District, Azerbaijan
- Sadarak (town), Azerbaijan, small town, municipal centre of the Sadarak District
