= Suraxanı, Agsu =

Suraxanı
- Municipality
- Location within Azerbaijan
- Coordinates: 40°42′48″N 48°28′21″E
- Country: Azerbaijan
- Rayon: Agsu

Population
  - Total: 151
- Time zone: UTC+4 (AZT)
  - Summer (DST): UTC+5 (AZT)

Suraxanı (also, Surakhany) is a village and municipality in the Agsu Rayon of Azerbaijan. It has a population of 151.
