= Zangezur (disambiguation) =

Zangezur is a historical and geographical region in Eastern Armenia. Zangezur may also refer to:

== Places ==
- Zangezur Mountains, a mountain range in Armenia and Azerbaijan
- Zangezur uezd, an historical administrative unit of the Elizavetpol Governorate of the Russian Empire

== Other uses ==
- Zangezur (film), a 1938 Soviet Armenian film

== See also ==
- East Zangezur Economic Region, an administrative division of Azerbaijan
