= Navoiy =

- District-level city
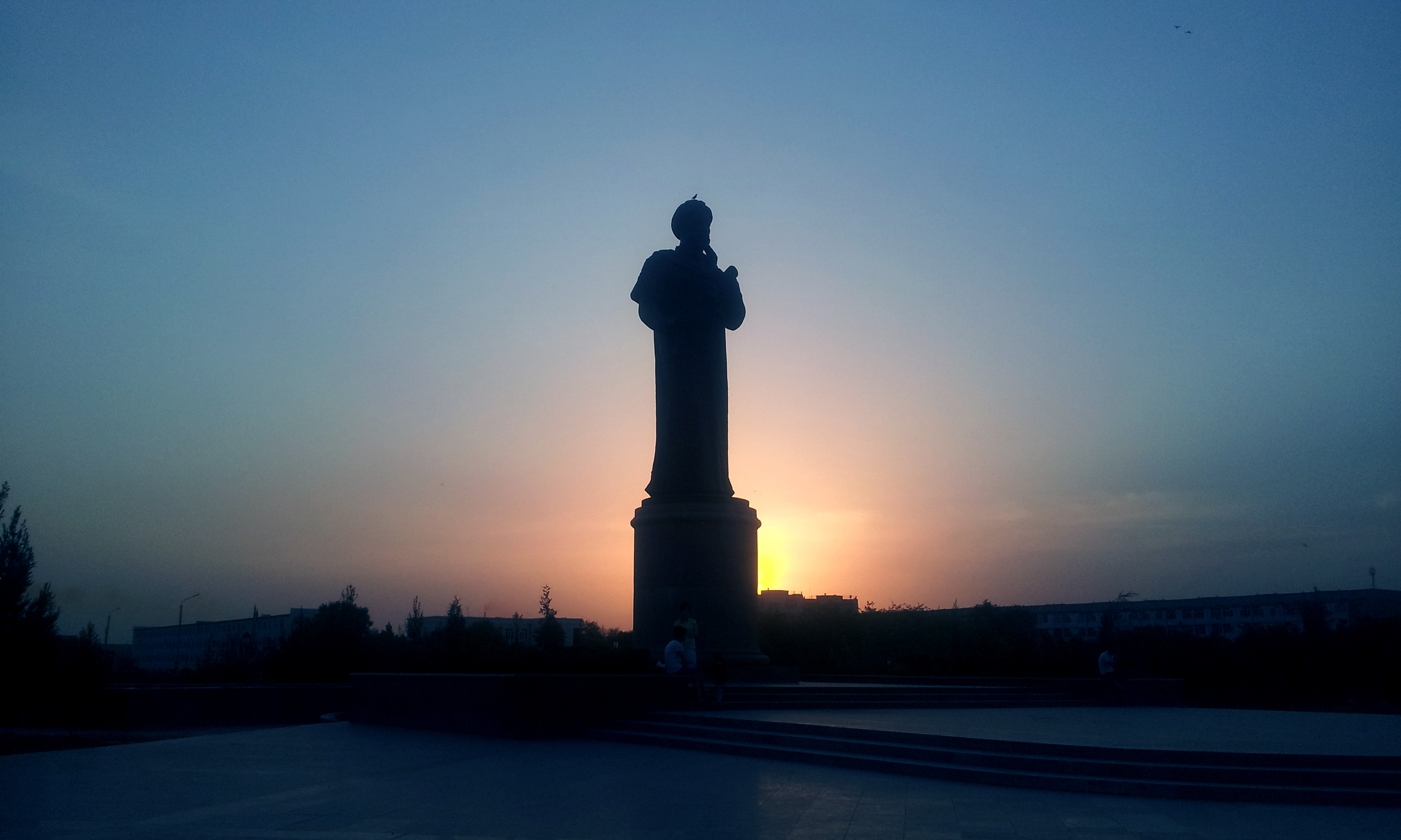
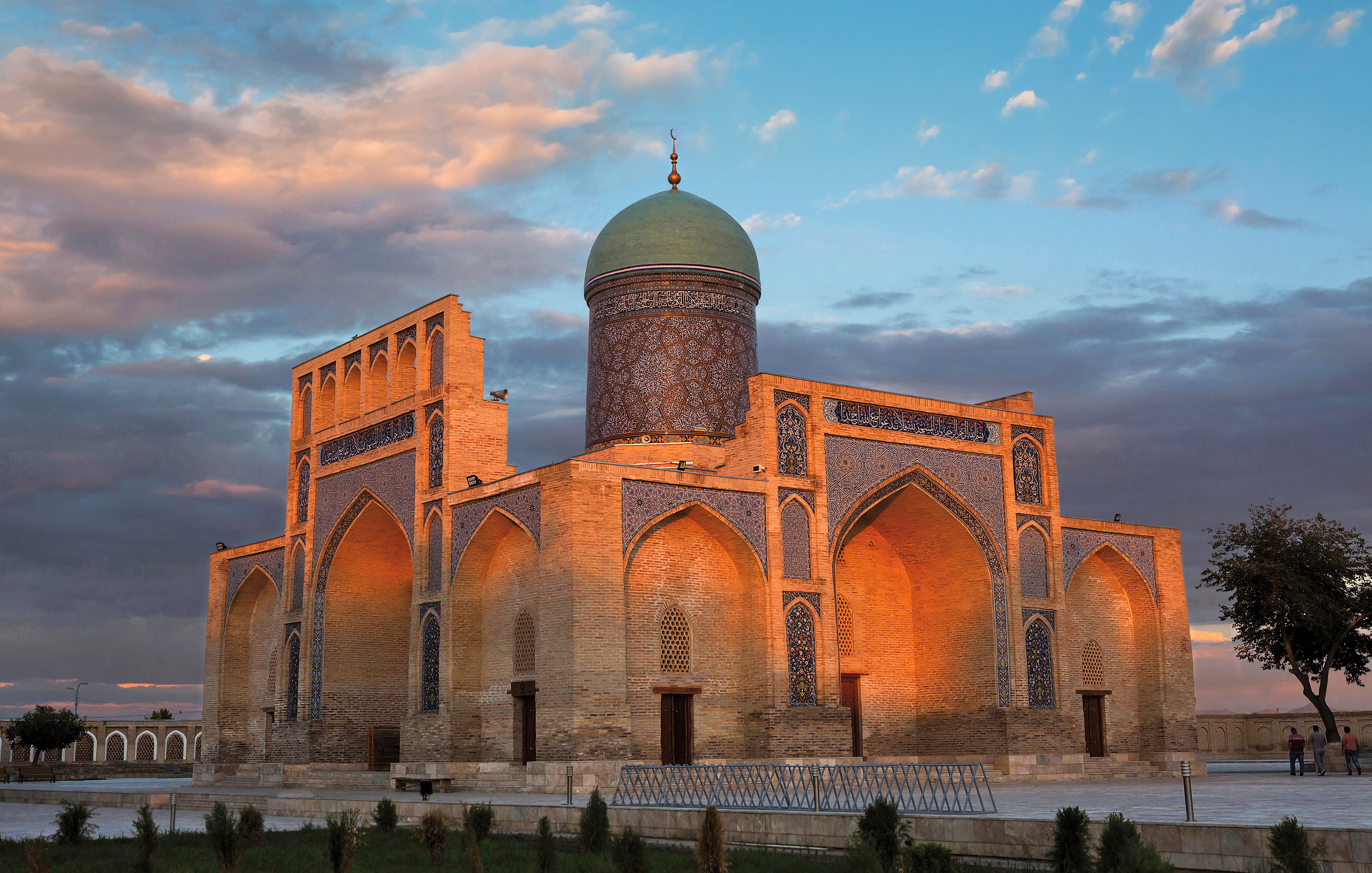
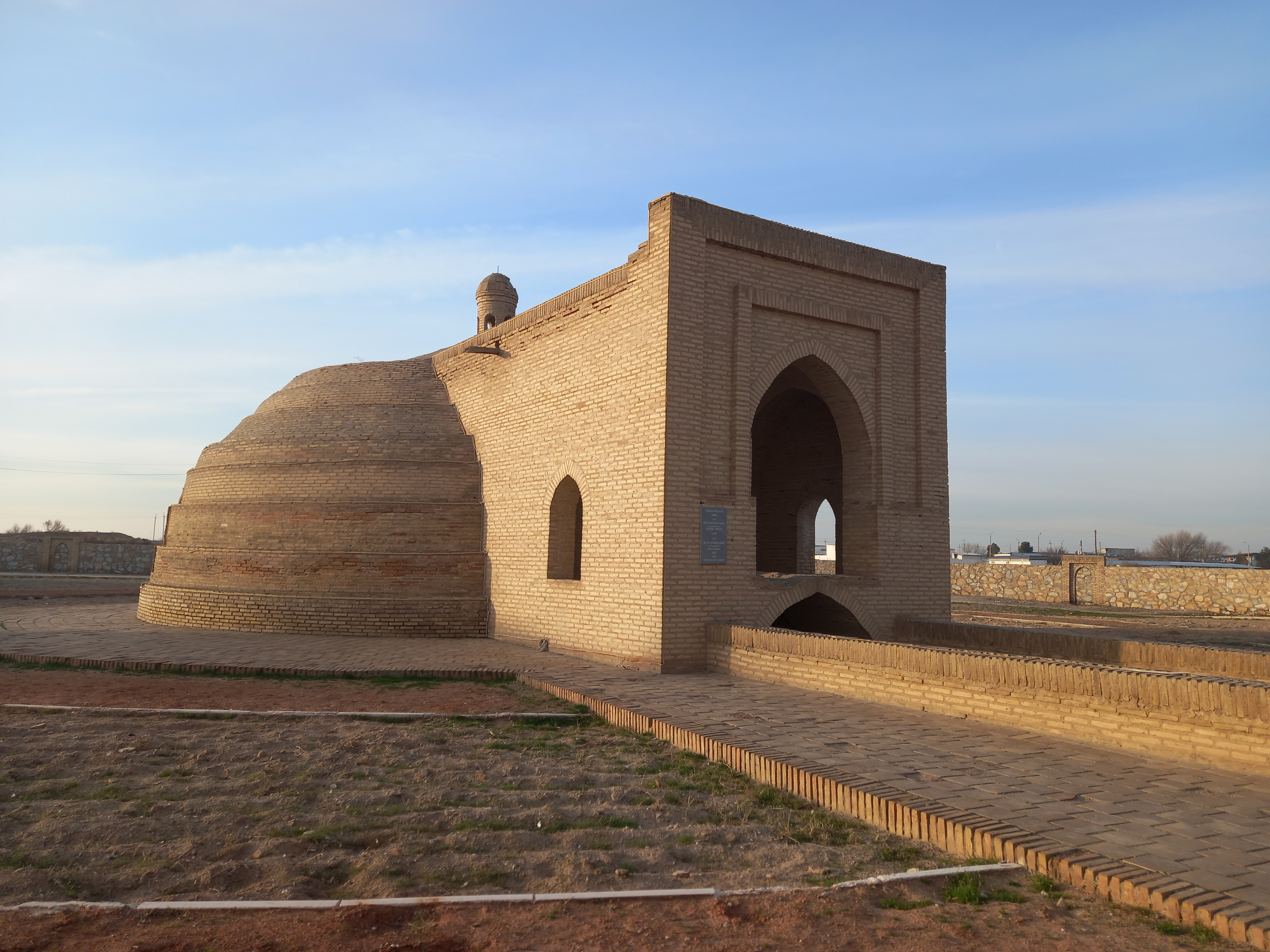
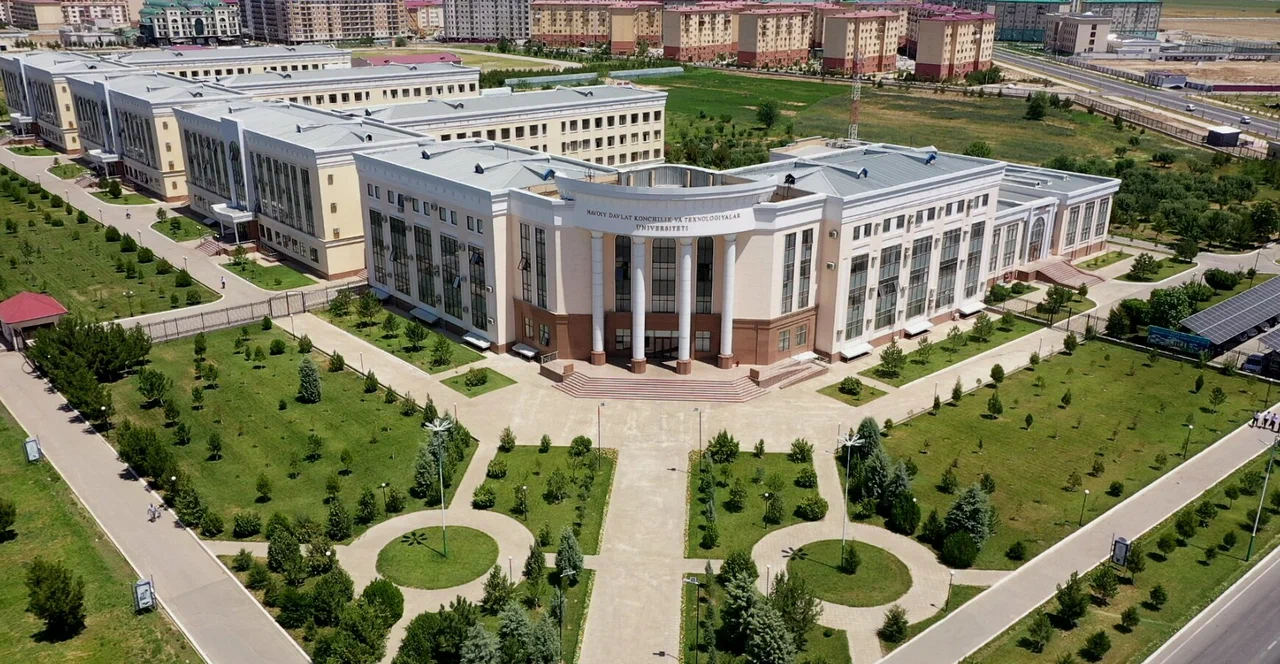
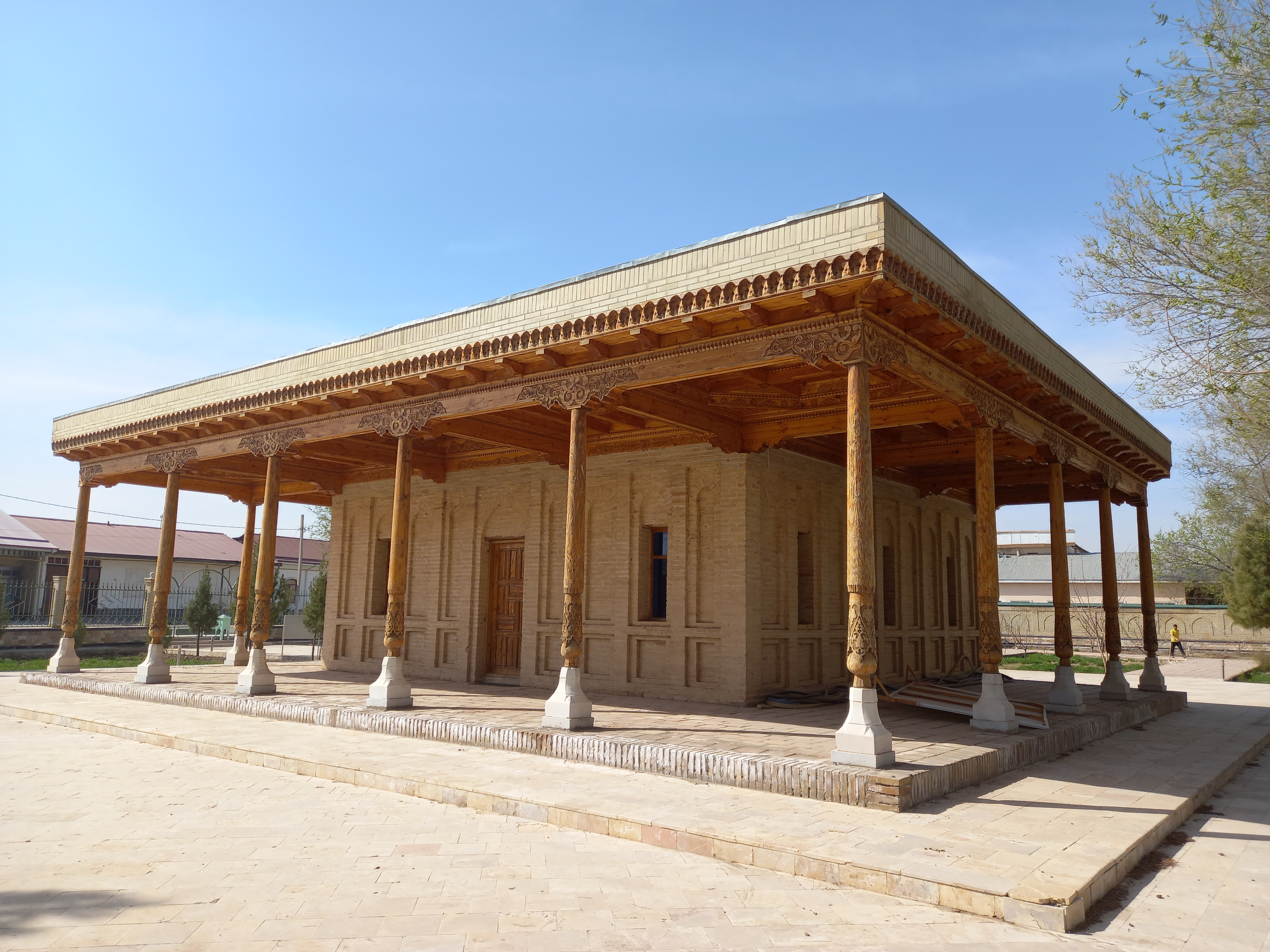
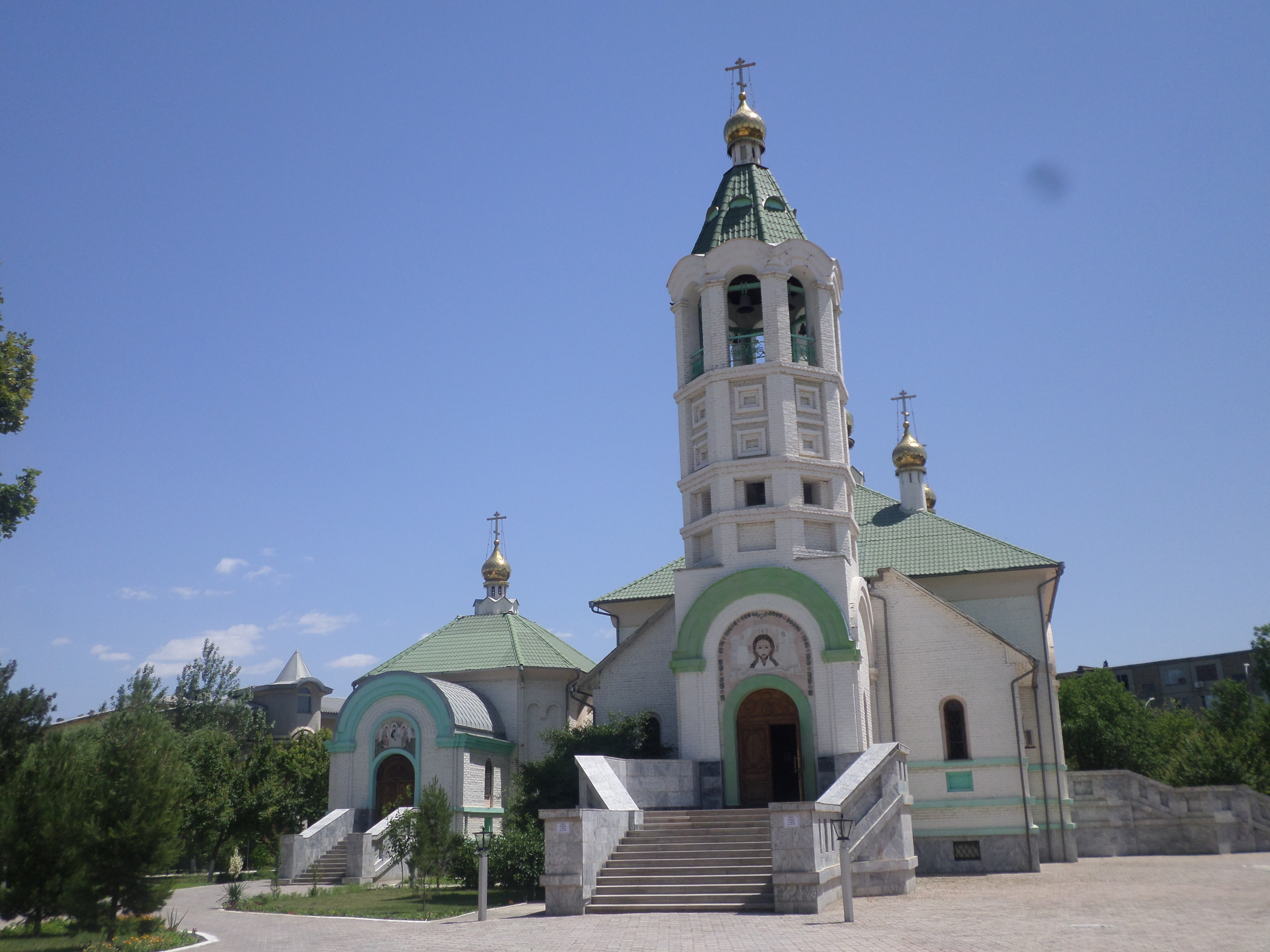
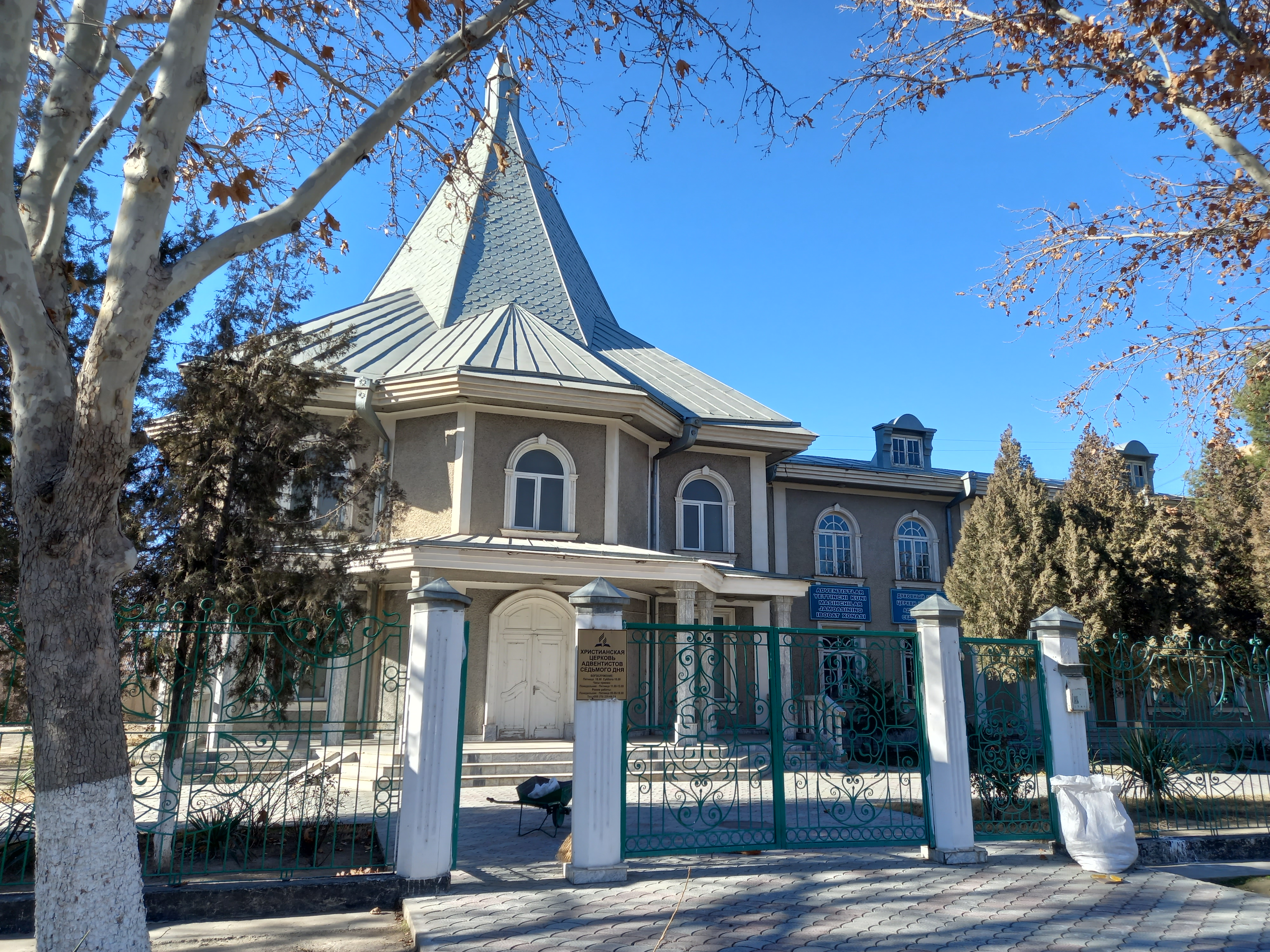
- Alisher Navoiy Monument Qosim Sheikh Complex Sardoba Malik Navoi State University of Mining and Technologies Mir-Sayid Bakhrom Mausoleum St. Sergius of Radonezh Church Seventh-day Adventist Church

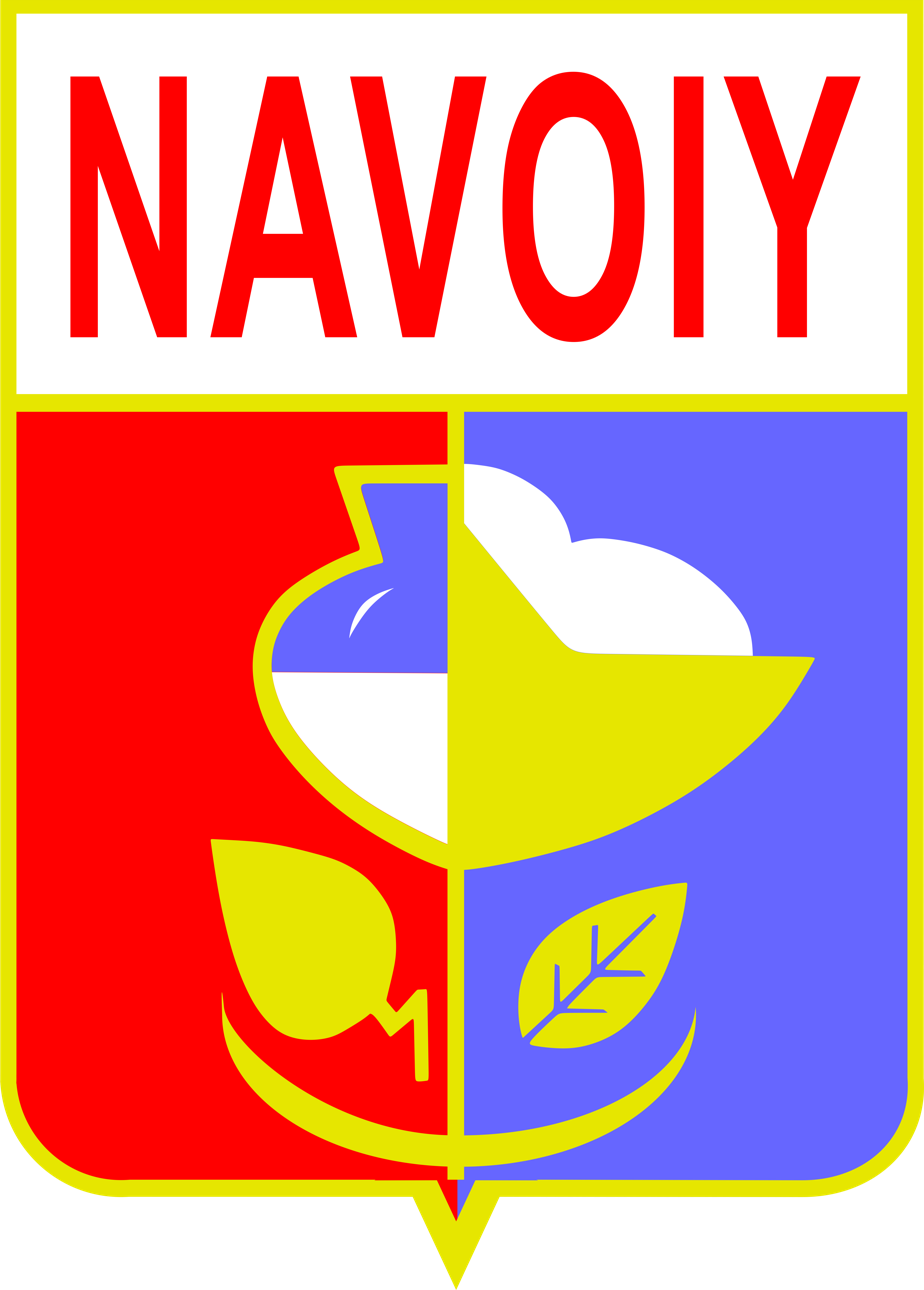
- Emblem

- Location in Uzbekistan Navoiy (West and Central Asia)
- Coordinates: 40°05′04″N 65°22′45″E
- Country: Uzbekistan
- Region: Navoiy
- City status: 1958

Government
  - Hokim (Mayor): Ergashev Dilmurod

Area
  - Total: 35 km^{2} (14 sq mi)
- Elevation: 382 m (1,253 ft)

Population (2026)
  - Total: 171,496
  - Density: 4,900/km^{2} (13,000/sq mi)
- Demonym(s): Navoiylik (Uzbek); Navoiyan
- Time zone: UTC+05:00
  - Summer (DST): UZT
- Postal Code: 210100
- Area code: (+998) 79
- Website: gov.uz/navoiy

Navoiy (/nævɑːˈiː/ na-vah-EE; Uzbek: [næʋɔˈij]) is a city and the capital of Navoiy Region in the central part of Uzbekistan. Administratively, it is a district-level city, that includes the urban-type settlement Tinchlik. The city is named after Alisher Navoiy. As of 2026, its population was 171,496 inhabitants.

== History ==
The city was founded in 1958, near the "Old city" originally known as Karmana under the Emirate of Bukhara, under the name of the great poet and statesman Alisher Navoiy, who wrote in Persian and Chaghatai at the court of Emir Husein Boykara (or Husayn Bayqaro) in Herat.

Even though the town is very young, it has rich history in this area and its surroundings. The Great Silk Road went through the region in ancient times. Archeological research in the area has also produced findings of numerous traces of Ancient Saki, Khwarazmian and Bactrian cultures.

== Government ==
List of hokims (governors) of Navoiy City
No.	Hokim	Took office	Left office	Ref.
1	Bahodir Joʻrayev	2009	2013	
2	Neʼmatillo Axatov	2013	2017	
3	Umarbek Xalilov	2017	2020	
4	Muxiddin Bazarov	2020	2023	
5	Dilmurod Ergashev	2023	Incumbent	

== Population ==
Historical population

Year	Pop.	±% p.a.
2001	138,082	—
2005	125,500	−2.36%
2007	125,800	+0.12%
2015	133,540	+0.75%
2016	133,526	−0.01%
2017	134,113	+0.44%
2018	135,548	+1.07%

Year	Pop.	±% p.a.
2019	136,374	+0.61%
2020	144,158	+5.71%
2021	146,865	+1.88%
2022	150,611	+2.55%
2023	156,000	+3.58%
2024	161,300	+3.40%

Source: Aznations.com

== Main sites ==
- The Rabati Malik is a heavily fortified 11th century caravanserai built by the Karakhanid ruler Abu’l Hasan Shams al Mulk Nasr to protect Silk Road merchants, their animals, and trade goods at night. The building is on UNESCO’s Tentative List for World Heritage Site status, along with Sardoba Malik, the domed reservoir which supplied the caravanserai with water. Rabati Malik is largely in ruins due to an earthquake in 1968, but the 12m high portal still stands and has been partially restored, as has the reservoir dome. The portal is decorated with carved terracotta, including eight-pointed stars and Arabic calligraphy.
- The Deggaroniy Mausoleum is the burial place of the theologian Mavlono Orif Deggaroniy (1313–76), teacher of Khoja Bahauddin Naqshbandi. It is a simple mud brick building with low domes, and is a place of pilgrimage for Naqshbandi Sufis.
- The Mir Said Bakhrom Mausoleum is a simple brick built mausoleum dating from the 11th century. The building is an important architectural prototype, with certain similarities to the Samanid Mausoleum in Bukhara. The portal is decorated with a Kufic inscription made from raised bricks, and the saint’s grave is covered with marble. The building is on UNESCO’s Tentative List for World Heritage Site status.
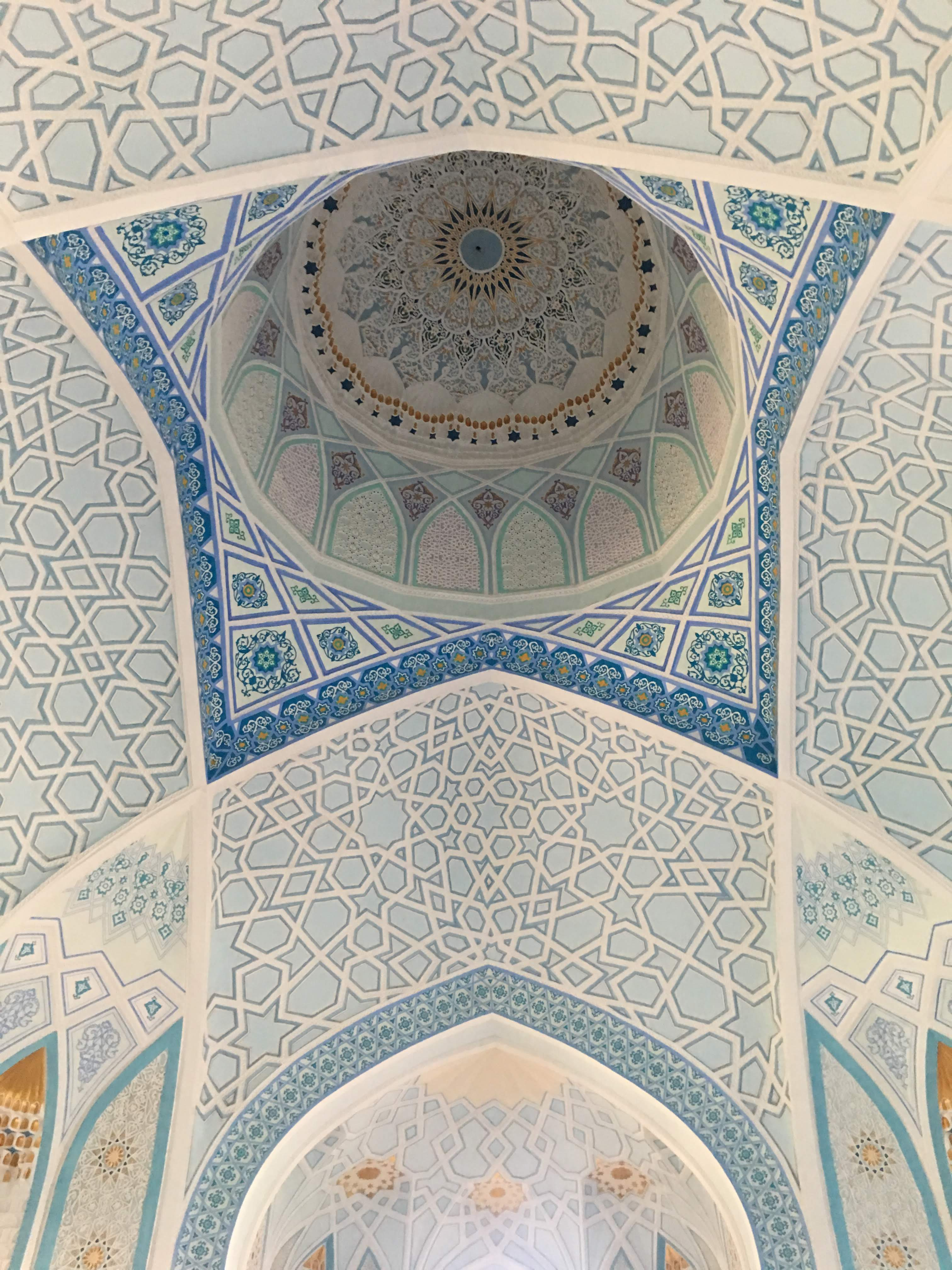
- Interior of the Kosim Sheikh Mausoleum in Navoiy, Uzbekistan
  The Kasim Sheikh complex was built in the 16th century by Abdulla Khan, Emir of Bukhara, as a khanagha, a hostel for wandering Sufi holy men. The mosque at the khanagha is now used as Navoi’s main mosque, but it is open to the public. There is an attractive turquoise dome and majolica tile work on the exterior of the building, and the interior is painted in geometric patterns in shades of blue.
- Adventist Church is the first and only Seventh-day Adventist church in the city of Navoi and it was built between 1996 and 2001.

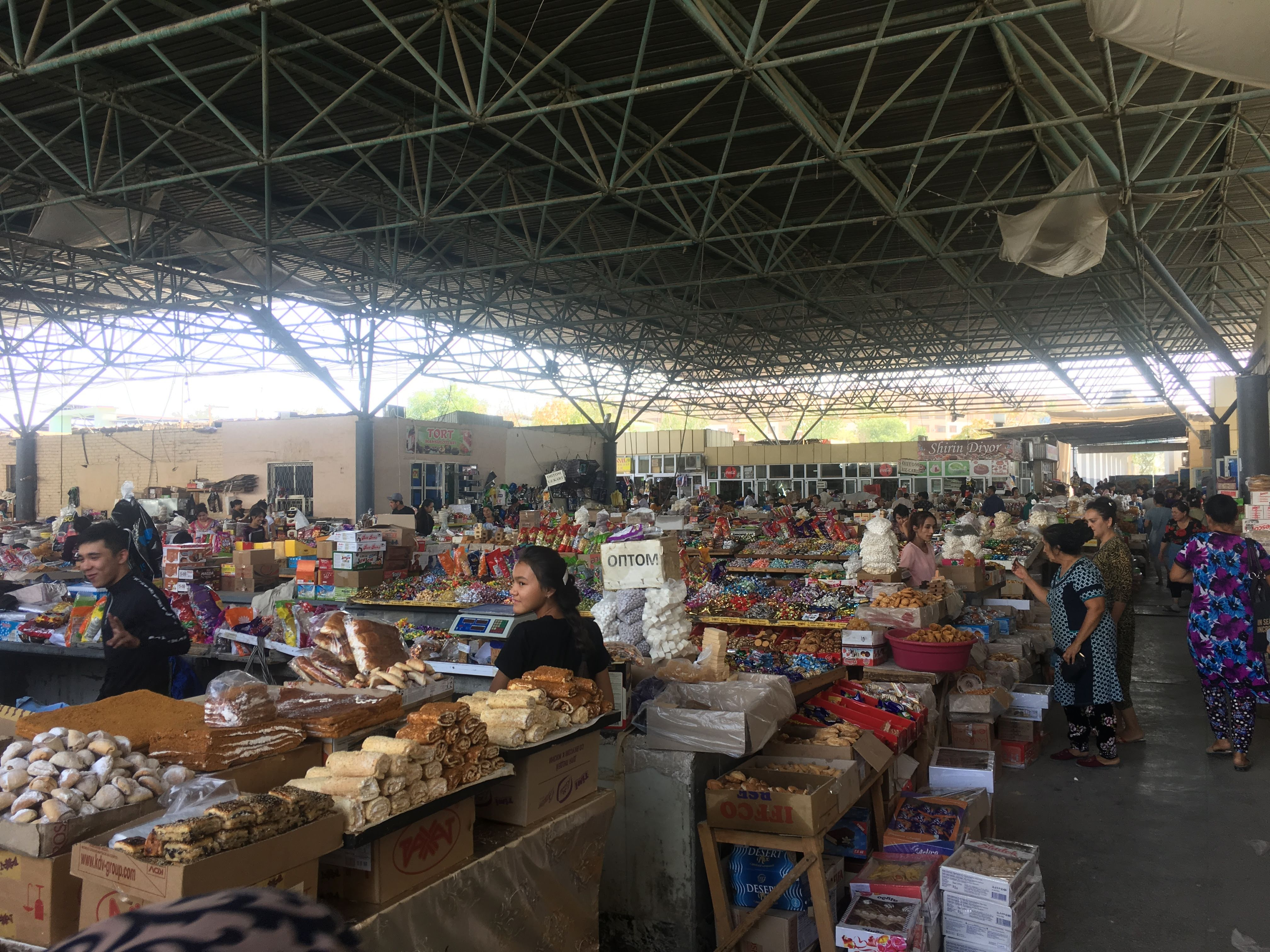
Navoiy Central Market, Navoiy, Uzbekistan

- Navoi Bazaar is the city’s main market. It is a huge, mostly covered market with different areas dedicated to fresh fruit and vegetables, dried goods, bread and pastries, meat, etc.

== Economy ==
Navoiy Region has large stocks of natural gas and deposits of precious metals, as well as large stocks of raw materials for production of construction materials. Among enterprises there are Navoi and Zarafshan Gold Mining and Metallurgical Complexes, which extract one of the purest golds in the world. The enterprise NavoiyAzot is the largest producer of mineral fertilizers in the country.

=== Navoiy Free Industrial Economic Zone (FIEZ) ===
The Navoi Free Industrial Economic Zone (FIEZ) with special conditions for foreign investments was created in Navoi Region of Uzbekistan, nearby Navoiy International Airport. It is due to operate for 30 years.

Businesses in FIEZ enjoy favourable customs, currency and tax regulations and simplified procedures for entry, stay and obtaining of work permit for non-resident citizens. They are exempt from taxes for a period depending on the amount of direct investments:

- from 3 to 10 million dollars – for 7 years;
- from 10 to 30 million dollars – for 10 years, with reduction of profit and unified tax payment rates by 50% in the next 5 years;
- more than 30 million dollars – for 15 years, with reduction of profit and unified tax payment rates by 50% in the next 10 years.
- Along with this, business entities will be exempted from paying customs duties (excluding charges for customs clearance) for equipment, raw materials and components imported for the production of export oriented goods. They will be able to make payments in foreign currency within the FIEZ, as well as to use convenient terms of payments for exported and imported goods.

Management of the FIEZ will be by an Administrative Council which may select an international company to manage the zone on a contract basis. A FIEZ development fund aimed to support infrastructure development is also planned.

13 joint ventures operate in Navoi FIEZ which produce car components, ADSL modems, LED lamps, cosmetics, diapers, and other products.

=== Transportation ===
The Zone will be located at a distance of 800 meters from the highway E-40, 1,8 km from the cargo terminal of Navoiy Airport, connected to international railway routes towards countries of Europe (via Russia), South Asia (via China), Middle East and the Gulf (via Iran). The distance to the nearest water and gas distribution centres is 800 m, electrical station – 8 km.

== Climate ==
Navoiy has a cold semi-arid climate (Köppen BSk) bordering on a cold desert climate (Köppen BWk), characterised by hot to sweltering and arid summers, alongside chilly winters with frequent light precipitation.

Climate data for Navoiy (1991–2020)
Month	Jan	Feb	Mar	Apr	May	Jun	Jul	Aug	Sep	Oct	Nov	Dec	Year
Mean daily maximum °C (°F)	7.3 (45.1)	10.1 (50.2)	16.6 (61.9)	23.5 (74.3)	29.5 (85.1)	34.9 (94.8)	36.5 (97.7)	35.0 (95.0)	29.8 (85.6)	22.8 (73.0)	14.7 (58.5)	8.9 (48.0)	22.5 (72.5)
Daily mean °C (°F)	2.6 (36.7)	4.6 (40.3)	10.3 (50.5)	16.7 (62.1)	22.4 (72.3)	27.4 (81.3)	29.3 (84.7)	27.1 (80.8)	21.2 (70.2)	14.5 (58.1)	8.2 (46.8)	3.9 (39.0)	15.7 (60.3)
Mean daily minimum °C (°F)	−0.8 (30.6)	0.6 (33.1)	5.4 (41.7)	10.8 (51.4)	15.3 (59.5)	19.0 (66.2)	20.8 (69.4)	18.6 (65.5)	13.3 (55.9)	7.8 (46.0)	3.5 (38.3)	0.3 (32.5)	9.6 (49.3)
Average precipitation mm (inches)	28.0 (1.10)	34.7 (1.37)	33.6 (1.32)	30.3 (1.19)	17.5 (0.69)	2.6 (0.10)	0.6 (0.02)	0.6 (0.02)	1.8 (0.07)	4.6 (0.18)	21.0 (0.83)	23.3 (0.92)	198.6 (7.82)
Average precipitation days (≥ 1.0 mm)	11	10	10	8	7	3	1	1	1	4	7	9	72
Source: NOAA

== Gallery ==
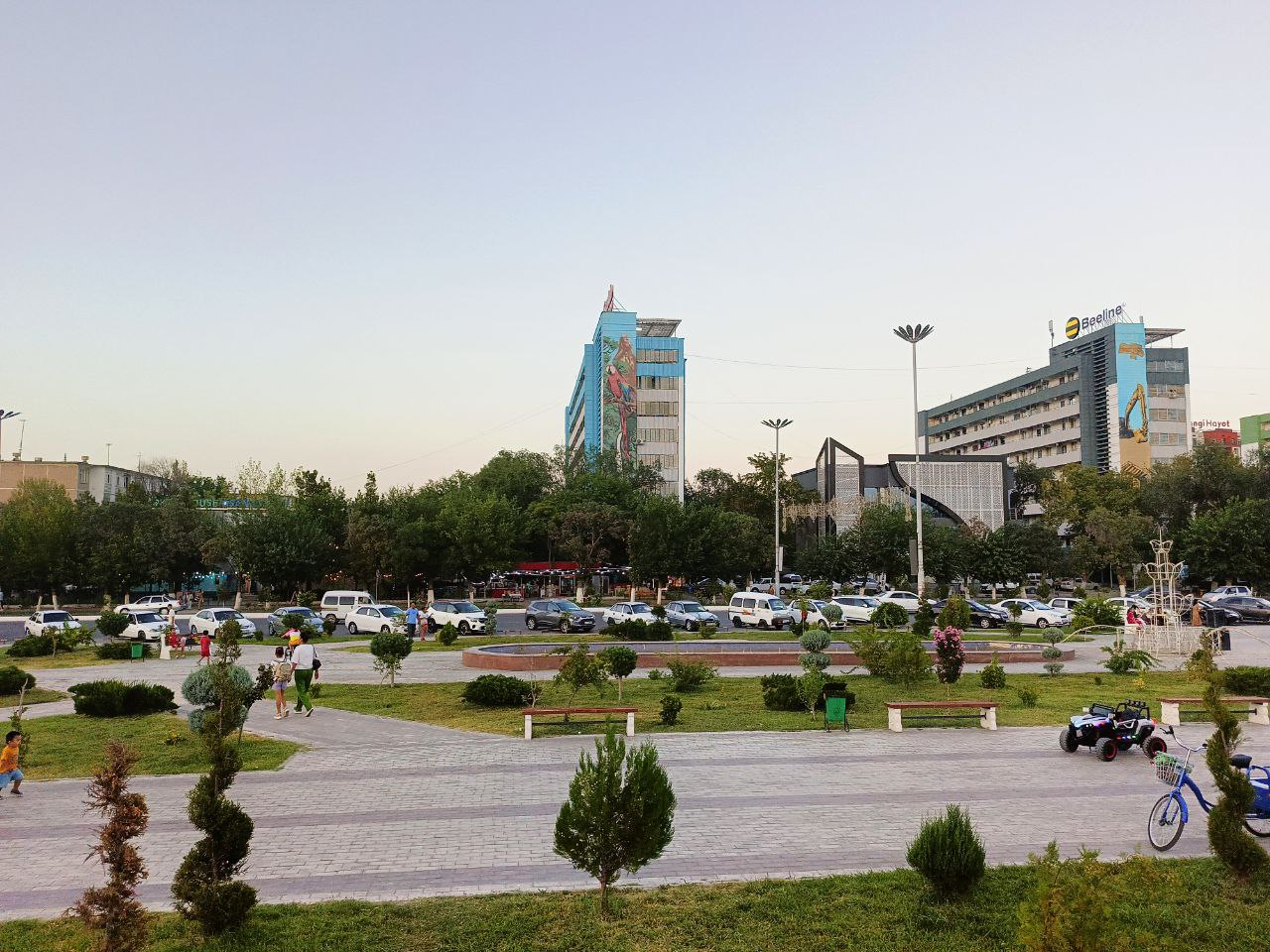
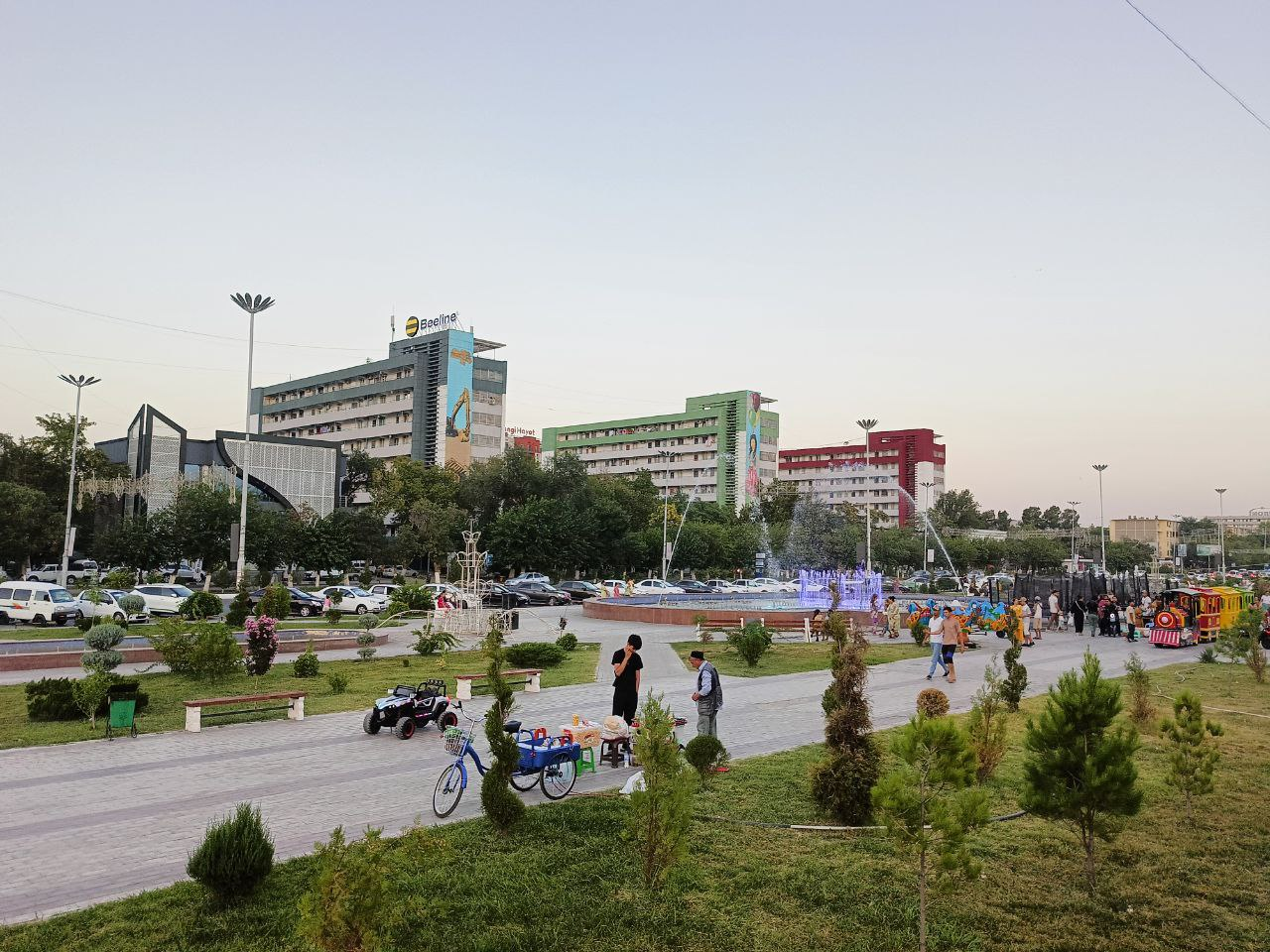
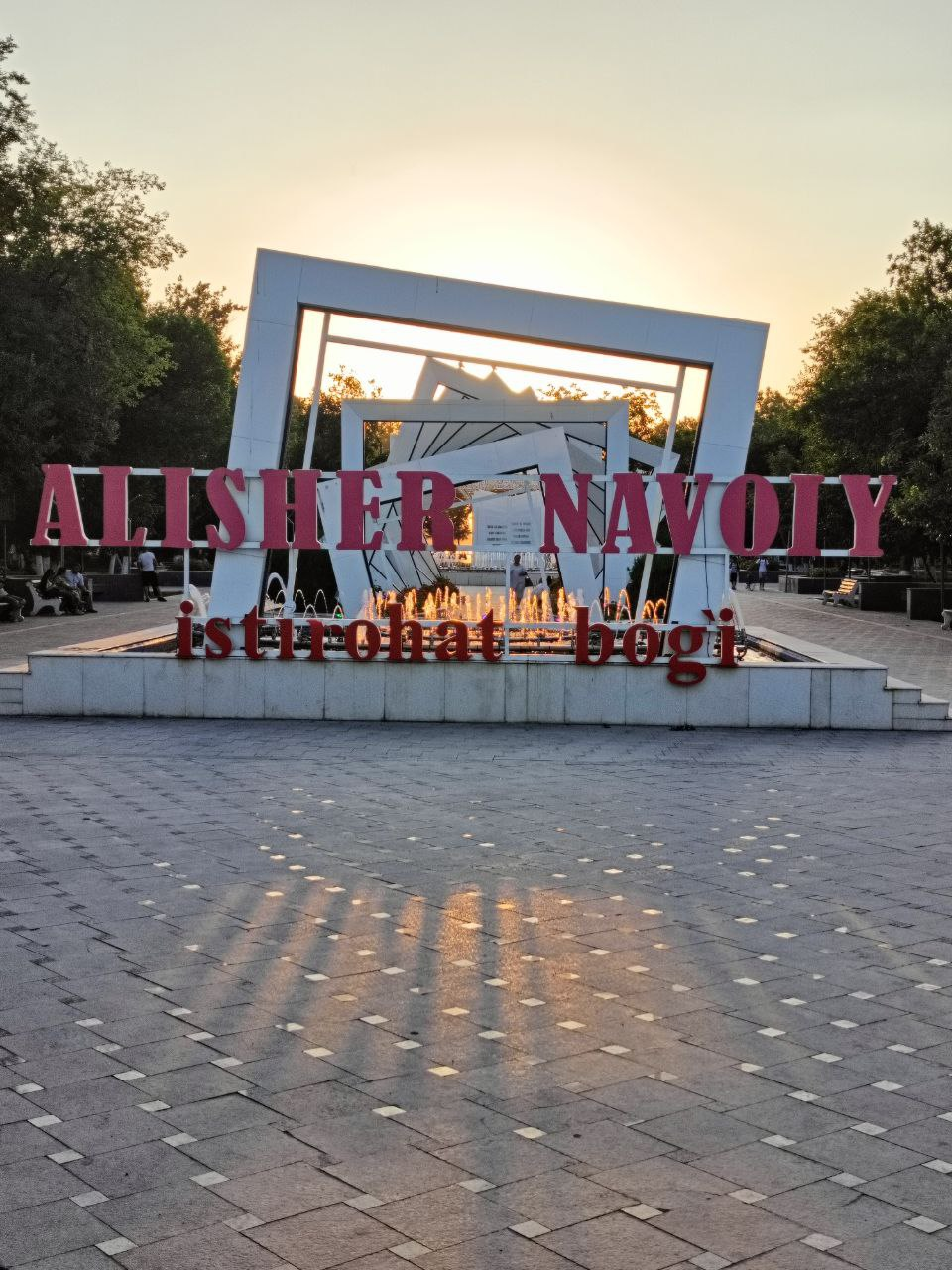
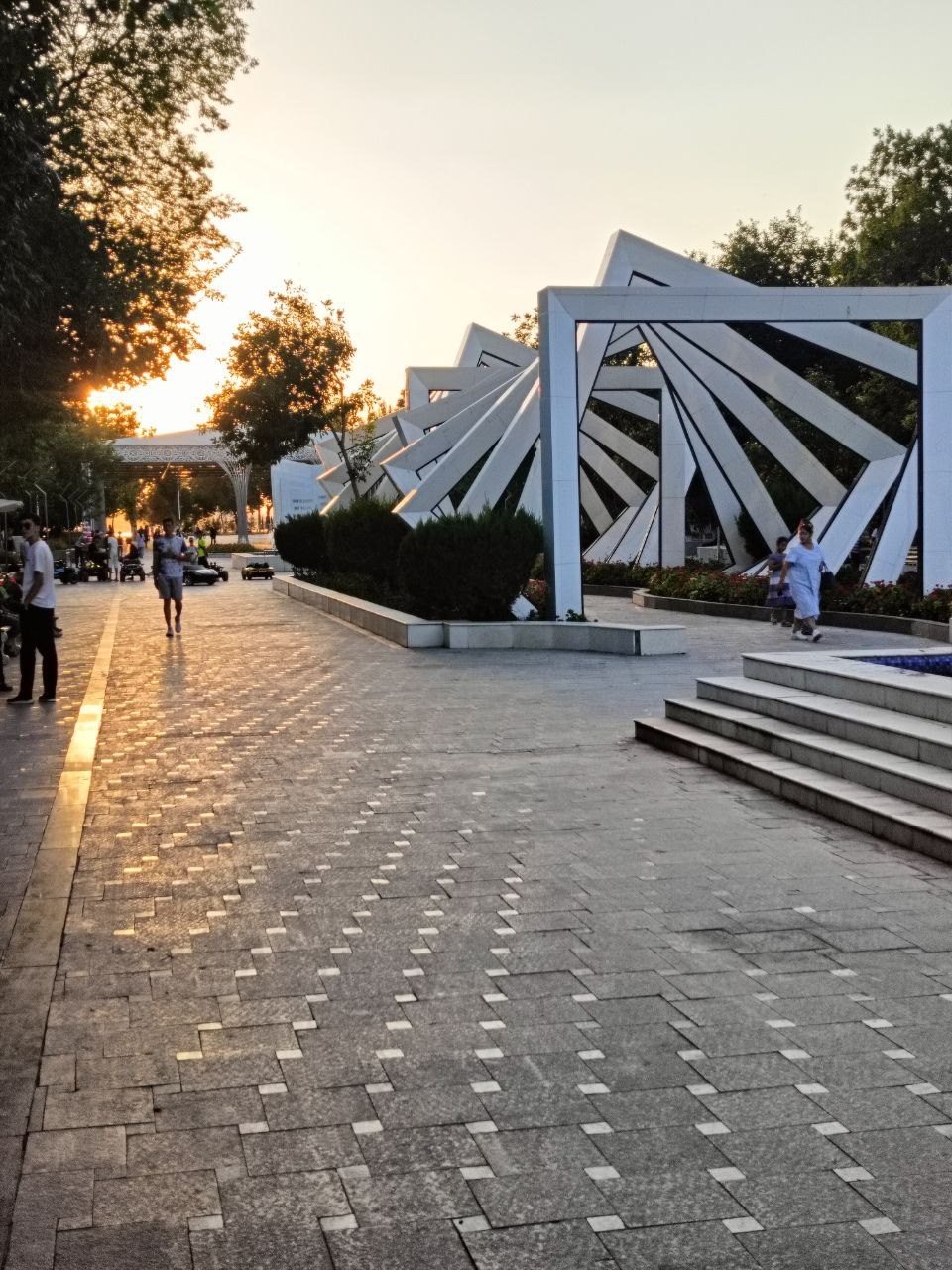
Islam Karimov Avenue	"Alisher Navoiy" Recreation Park

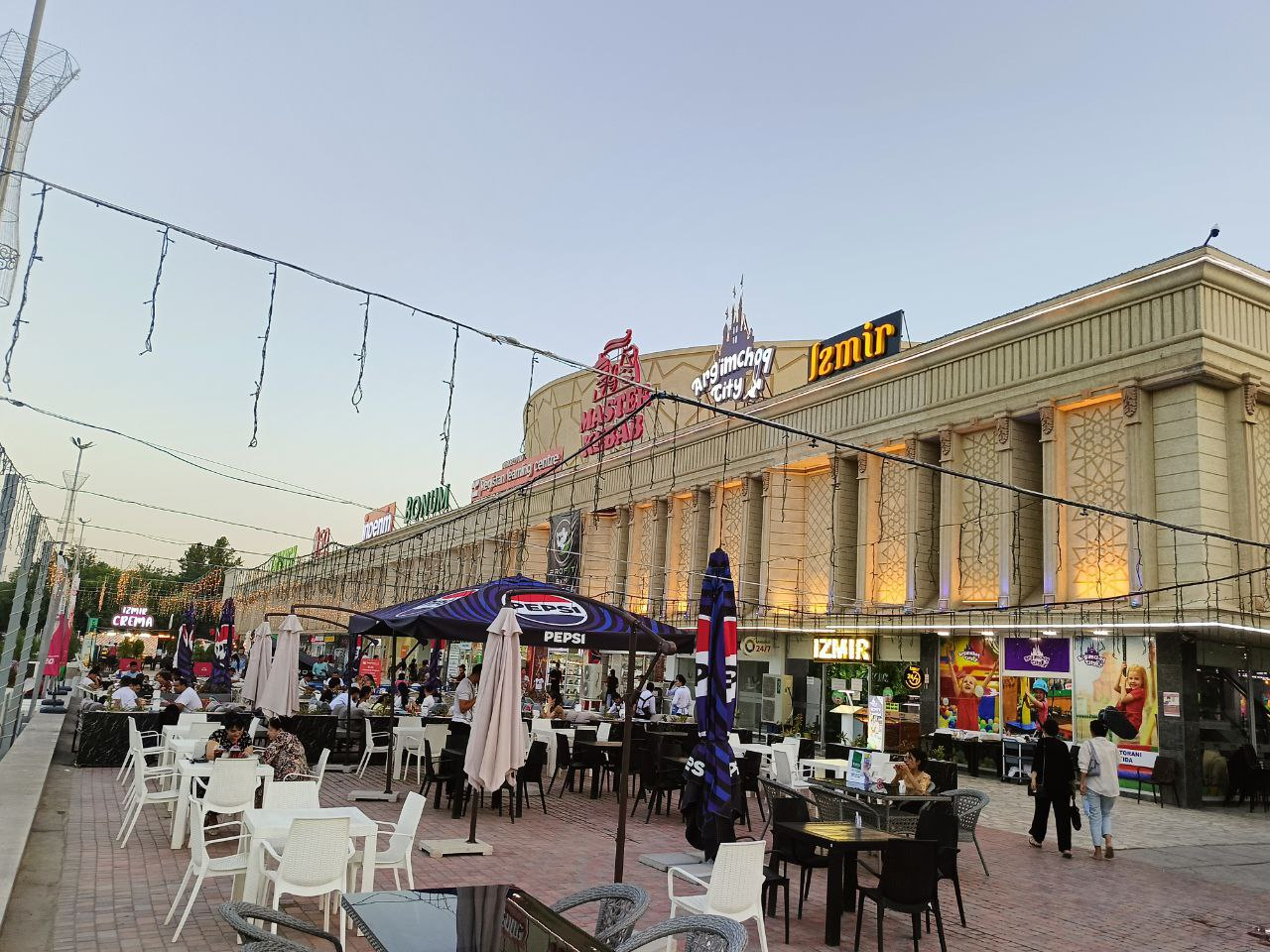
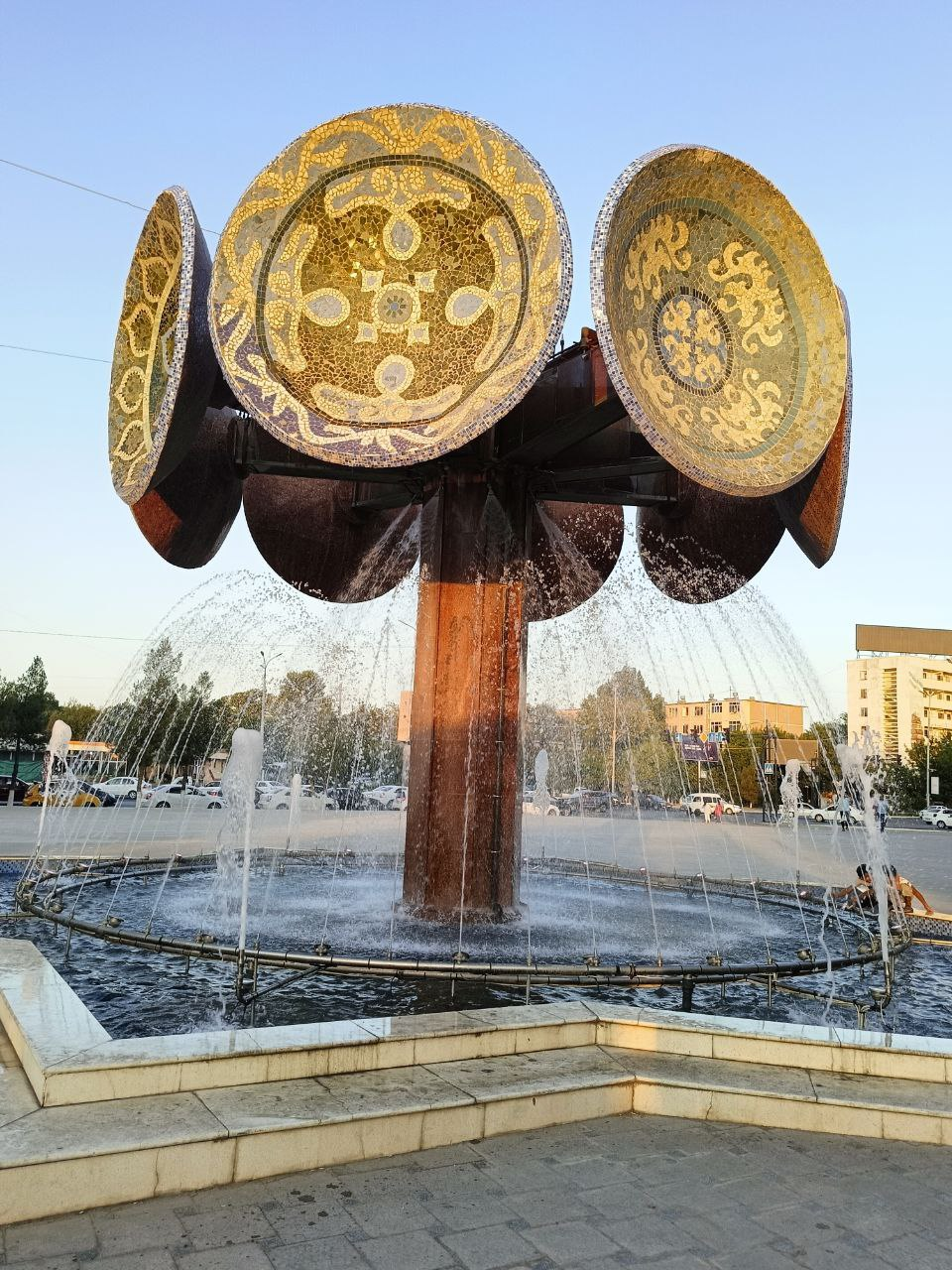
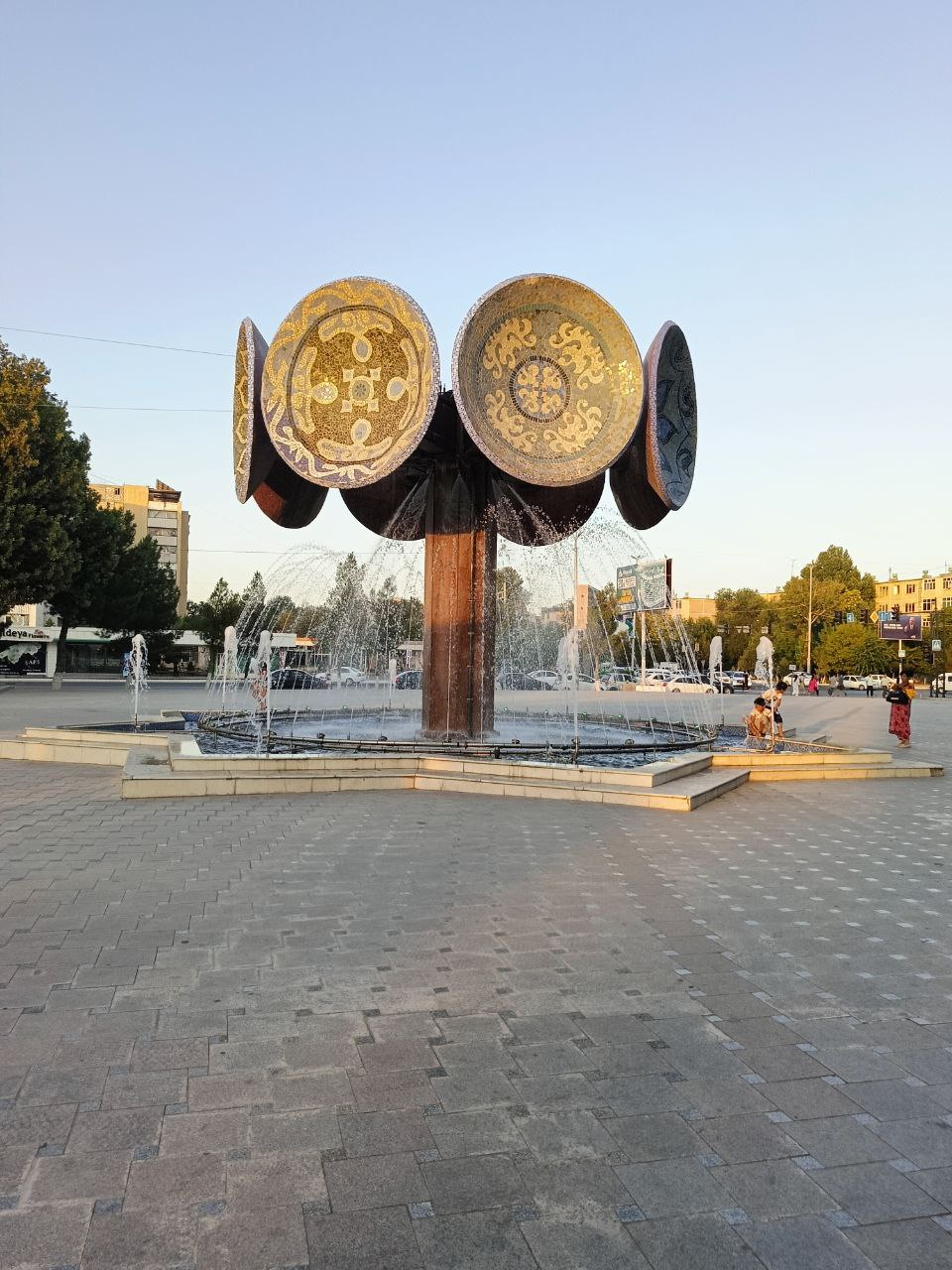
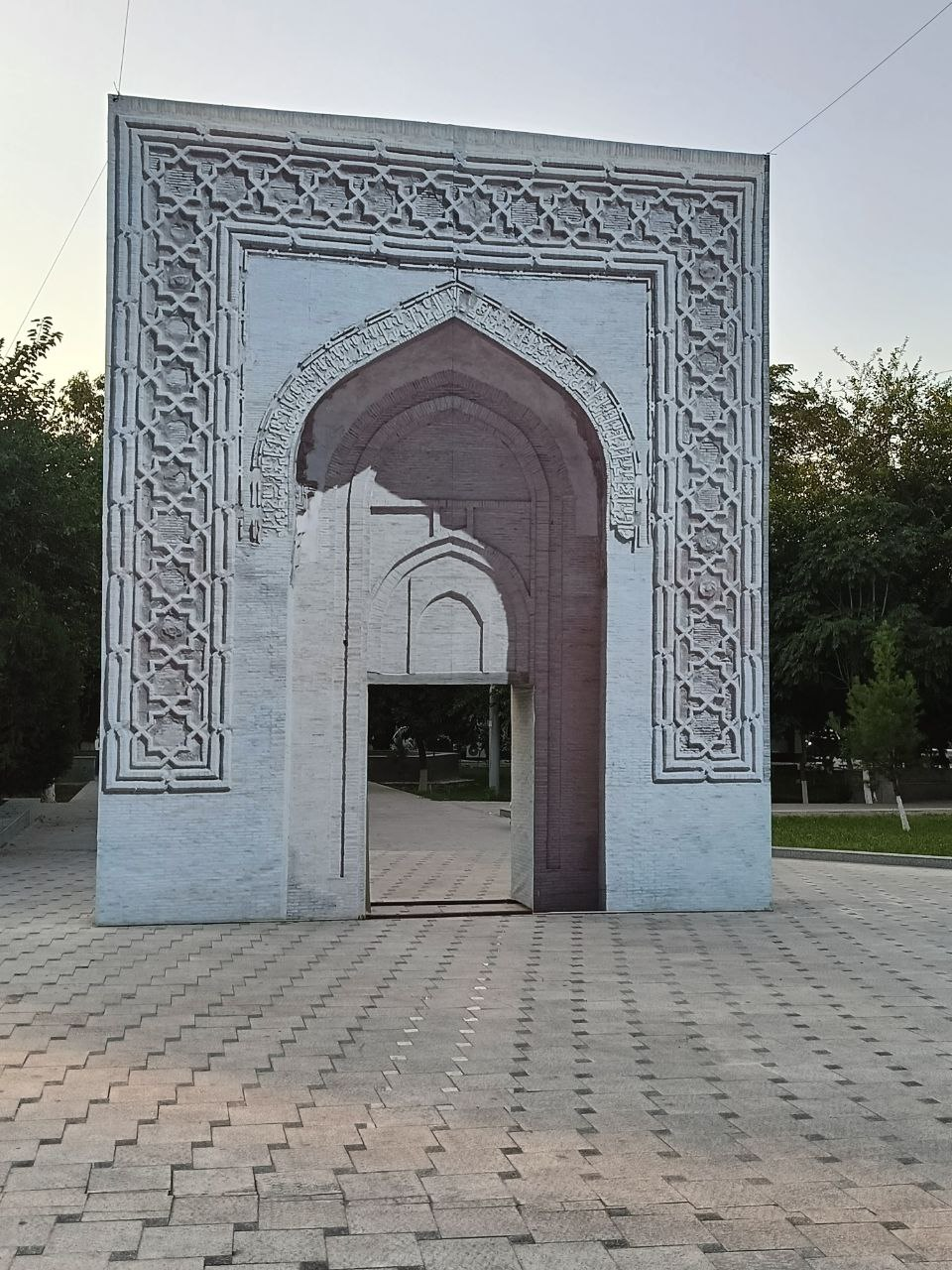
Central Department Store	"Alisher Navoiy" Recreation Park
