= Artavaz =

Artavaz Արտավազ
- Village
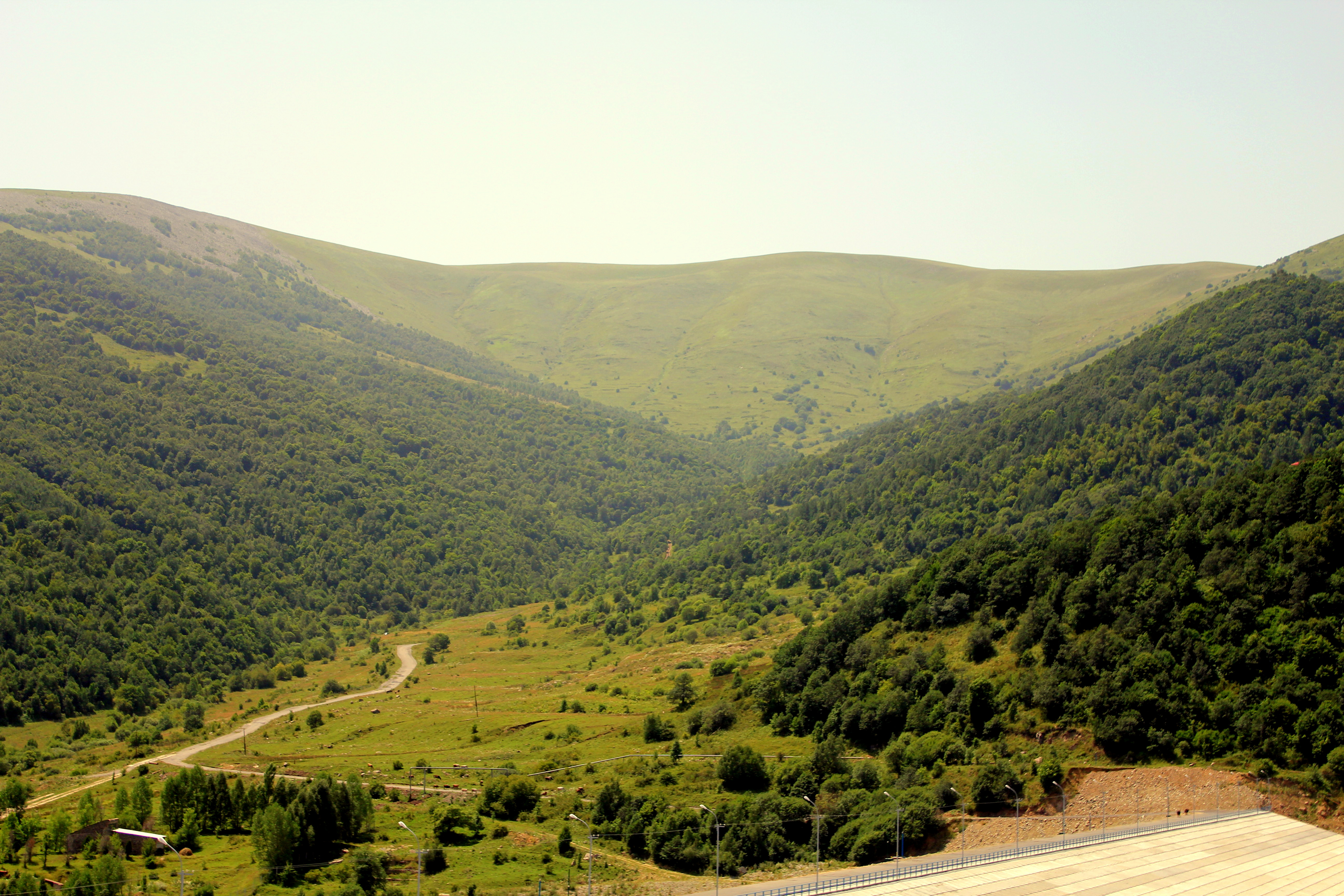

- Location within Armenia
- Coordinates: 40°37′09″N 44°34′29″E
- Country: Armenia
- Marz (Province): Kotayk

Population (2011)
  - Total: 467
- Time zone: UTC+4 ( )

Artavaz (Armenian: Արտավազ) is a village and a summer resort in the Kotayk Province of Armenia, on the left bank of Marmarik River. The nearby village of Pyunik is also included in the community of Artavaz.
