= Avdeyevo =

Avdeyevo (Russian: Авдеево) is the name of several rural localities in Russia:

- Avdeyevo, Moscow Oblast, a village in Zaraysky District of Moscow Oblast
- Avdeyevo, Novgorod Oblast, a village in Pestovsky District of Novgorod Oblast
- Avdeyevo, Republic of Karelia, a village in Pudozhsky District of Republic of Karelia
- Avdeyevo, Ust-Kubinsky District, Vologda Oblast, a village in Ust-Kubinsky District, Vologda Oblast
- Avdeyevo, Vologodsky District, Vologda Oblast, a village in Vologodsky District of Vologda Oblast
- Avdeyevo, Yaroslavl Oblast, a village in Poshekhonsky District of Yaroslavl Oblast
