= Vodlozersky National Park =

National park of Russia

- Russian: Водлозерский национальный парк
- IUCN category II (national park)
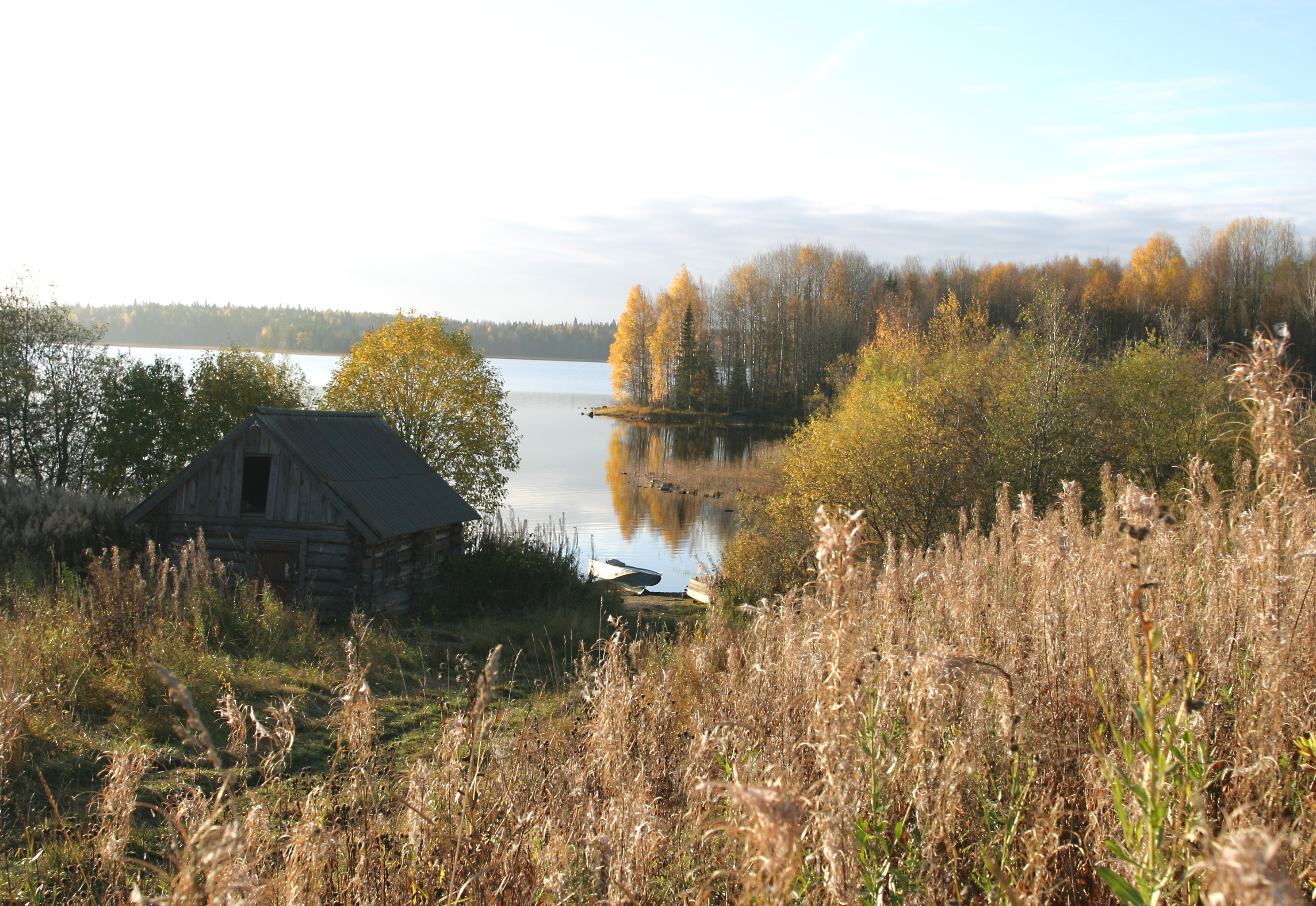
- Lake Pilmas, Vodlozersky National Park

- Location within Russia
- Location: Russia
- Nearest city: Pudozh, Onega
- Coordinates: 62°38′57″N 37°04′58″E
- Area: 4,280 square kilometres (1,650 square miles)
- Established: 1991
- Visitors: around 1000 (in 1996)
- Governing body: Federal Forestry Service

Vodlozersky National Park (Russian: Водлозерский национальный парк) is a national park in the north of Russia, located in Onezhsky District of Arkhangelsk Oblast and Pudozhsky District in the Republic of Karelia. It was established April 20, 1991. Since 2001, the National Park has the status of a UNESCO Biosphere Reserve. The national park was created to protect coniferous forests (taiga) of Northern Russia.

The park covers 4,280 square kilometres (1,650 square miles); additionally, 400 square kilometres (150 square miles) are used by the park but belong to third parties. At the time of creation, Vodlozersky National Park was the second-largest national park in Europe after Yugyd Va National Park. The park area includes Lake Vodlozero, the river basin of the Ileksa, the main inflow of the lake, and the upper course of the Vodla, the outflow.

== History ==
The first people settled in the Lake Vodlozero area in the prehistoric time, around six to eight thousand years BC. Russians (Novgorodians) colonized the lake area when they were looking for trade routes leading to the White Sea. Lake Vodlozero was one of the points on the route which further lead to the Onega River, and it was colonized in the 14th to 15th centuries. There are several dozen monuments of wooden architecture (18th- to 19th-century) located in the park. The most prominent one is Ilyinsky Pogost, an ensemble of a wooden church surrounded by a wall. In the beginning of the 20th century, there were about 40 villages around Lake Vodlozero, most of which are currently deserted.

The national park was created in 1991 and became one of the first national parks in Russia. In 1996 the park was considered for inclusion as a World Heritage Site but was rejected. The reason for the rejection was that it was not a "natural" site. Currently, it is being resubmitted under the criteria of a "cultural landscape".

== Location and geography ==
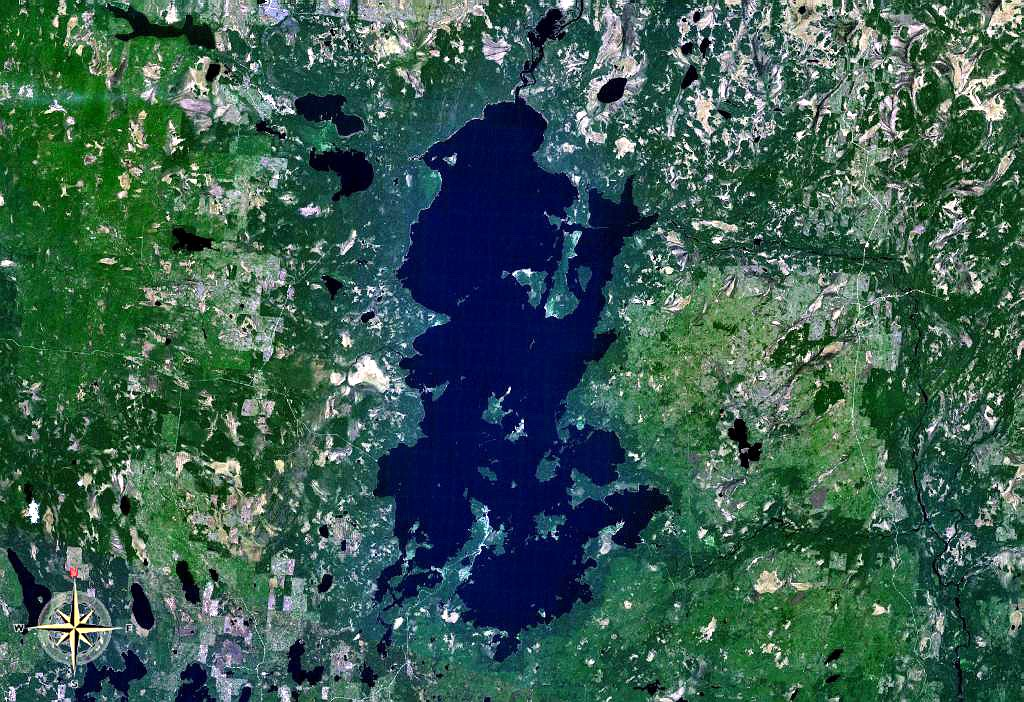
Lake Vodlozero from space

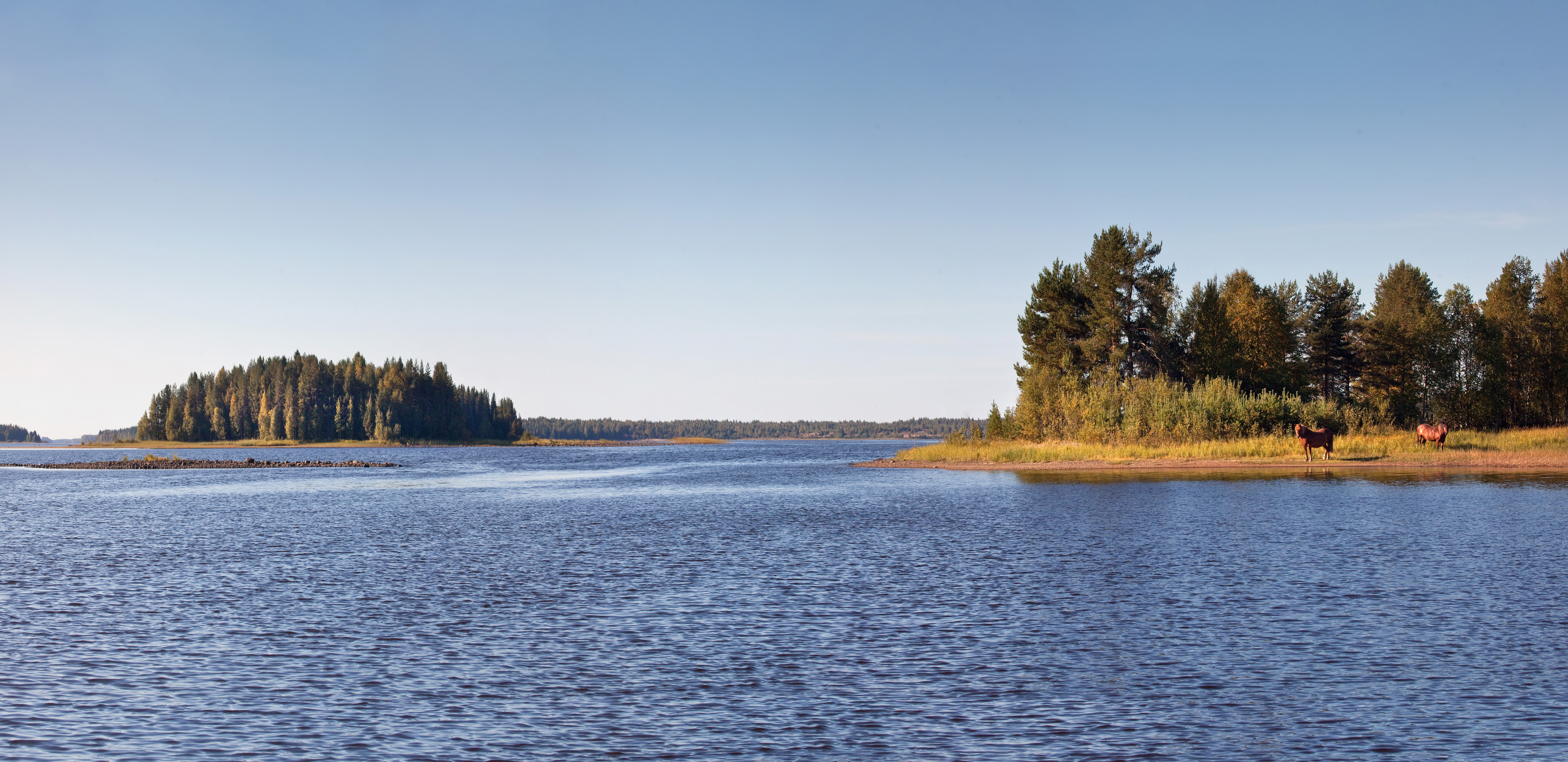
Vodlozersky National Park and horses. September 2010

The two parts of the National Park—the southern part, around Lake Vodlozero, and the northern part, in the river valley of the Ileksa—are characterized by different climate. The northern part has the climate typical for the northern taiga, with long and cold winters (the minimum temperature recorded in the park was −45 °C (−49 °F)). The climate of the southern part is more mild.

The northern part is hilly, with hills up to 20 metres (66 ft) high. In the northern part, there is Vetreny Poyas Ridge (Russian: Кряж Ветряный Пояс, literally translated as The Windy Belt)/ The southern part is almost flat.

There are many lakes in the park. By far the biggest one is Lake Vodlozero, however, there are also lakes in the Ileksa river basin, including Lake Monastyrskoye, Lake Nelmozero, Lake Luzskoye. Swamps cover about 40% of the area of the park.

Almost the whole area of the part is covered by woods. Of these, 53.5% are spruce forests, 44.1% are pine forests, and about 2% are birch (Betula pubescens and Betula pendula) and aspen forests.

== Tourism and infrastructure ==
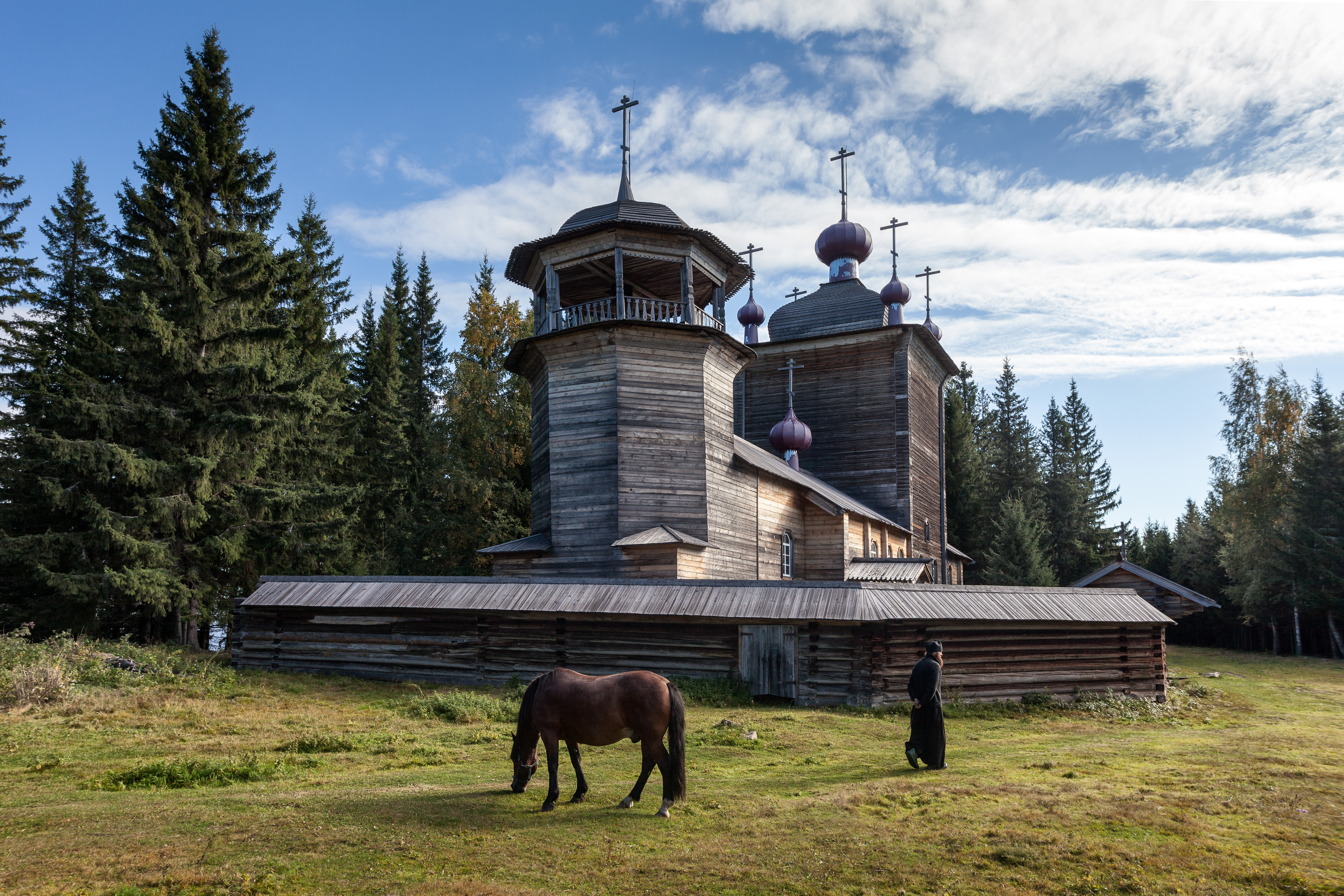
The wooden church of Ilyinsky Pogost, a recognized cultural monument, is built on an island on Lake Vodlozero

There is only one settlement in the limits of the park, the village of Kuganavolok. It is connected by road with the town of Pudozh. There is a visitor center in the village. There are also some recreation facilities as well as camping places elsewhere in the park.

All visitors of the park need to buy a permit at a visitor center (in the park or in Petrozavodsk).

The Ileksa and the Vodla are popular for whitewater rafting. There are birdwatching and fishing facilities.
