= Pulkovo Airport =

International airport serving Saint Petersburg, Russia

Pulkovo Airport Аэропорт Пулково

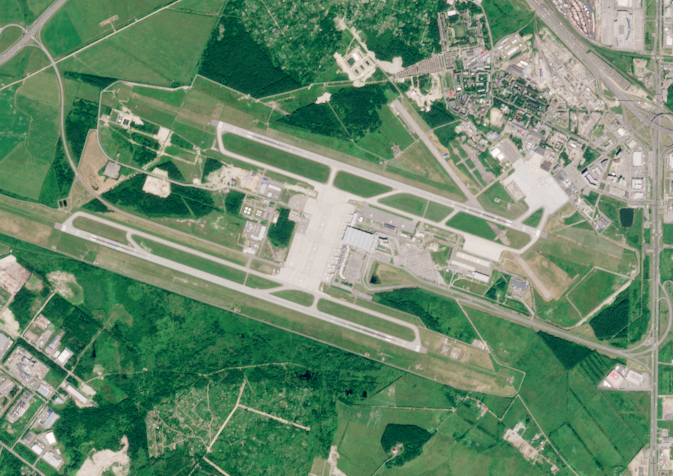
- IATA: LED; ICAO: ULLI; LID: ПЛК; WMO: 26063

Summary
- Airport type: International
- Owner: Saint Petersburg City Administration
- Operator: Northern Capital Gateway
- Serves: Saint Petersburg, Russia
- Hub for: Aeroflot; Nordwind Airlines; Pobeda; Rossiya Airlines; Smartavia; Ural Airlines
- Elevation AMSL: 79 ft (24 m)
- Coordinates: 59°48′01″N 30°15′45″E
- Website: pulkovoairport.ru

Map
- Location of the airport in Saint Petersburg Location of the airport in Russia Location of the airport in Europe

Runways
Direction	Length		Surface
Direction	m	ft	Surface
10R/28L	3,780	12,401	Cement-concrete
10L/28R	3,397	11,145	Cement-concrete

Statistics (2022)
- Passengers: 18,140,100
- Aircraft movements: 144,867
- Sources: Russian Federal Air Transport Agency (see also provisional 2018 statistics)

Pulkovo Airport (Russian: Аэропорт Пулково, IPA: [ˈpuɫkəvə], Internal code: ПЛК) (IATA: LED, ICAO: ULLI) is an international airport serving St. Petersburg, Russia. It is the 2nd-busiest airport in Russia and post-Soviet states as well as 30th-busiest airport in Europe. It consists of one terminal which is located 23 km (14 mi) south of the city centre. The airport serves as a hub for Aeroflot and Rossiya Airlines and as focus city for Smartavia. It is responsible for serving the citizens of Saint Petersburg and the Leningrad Oblast, a total of 6,120,000 people.

== Description ==
Pulkovo Airport was officially opened on June 24, 1932, as a state-owned domestic airport. According to provisional figures for 2017, 16,125,520 passengers passed through the airport, a 21.6% increase over 2016. This makes Pulkovo the 4th busiest airport in Russia and the post-Soviet states. Pulkovo is one of the largest airports in Russia and Eastern Europe.

== History ==
=== 1931–1986 ===
In January 1931, construction of an aerodrome near Leningrad (Saint Petersburg's official name between 1924 and 1991 and the source of the airfield's IATA code of "LED") commenced and was completed on 24 June 1932, with the first aircraft arriving at 17:31 that day, after a two-and-a-half hour flight from Moscow carrying passengers and mail. This aerodrome was at first named Shosseynaya Airport, the name coming from the nearby Shosseynaya railway station. Soon after, the airport opened regular flights to Petrozavodsk, Pudozh, Arkhangelsk, and Murmansk.

In 1936, a foundation for a new terminal was laid out. Leningrad's airport was also provided with new G-2s and PS-84s. In 1941, a new completely commercial passenger route between Moscow and Leningrad was opened; before it was a mixed passenger-mail route. Construction of the new terminal thrived between 1937 and 1941. The architects of the new three-story terminal were Aleksandr Ivanovich Gegello and N.E. Lansere.

Construction was abruptly put on hold in July 1941, one month after Nazi Germany's invasion of the USSR on 22 June 1941. The airport was the front line in the German Siege of Leningrad. There were no flights between 1941 and 1944. The nearby Pulkovo hills were occupied by the Germans and were used by German long-range artillery for daily bombardments of Leningrad. The airport was cleared of the Germans in January 1944, and cargo and mail flights were resumed after the runways were repaired in 1945. In February 1948, after the damage was completely repaired, the airport resumed scheduled passenger flights. In 1949, there were scheduled flights to 15 major cities of the USSR, and 15 more short-range flights within north-western Russia. In 1949, Shosseynaya Airport recorded a passenger traffic rate of 6,305,333 tons of mail, and 708 tons of cargo.

In 1951, the construction of the new terminal was complete. In the mid-1950s the new extended runway was completed, allowing the airport to handle larger aircraft such as Ilyushin-18 and Tupolev-104. In that same time period, the use of jet engine planes began in Shosseynaya Airport. On 15 March 1959, the USSR-42419 Tu-104 was the first commercial jet airplane to take off from the Shosseynaya Airport.

In the early 1960s, modern regional airplanes such as the An-24 and Yak-40 began to appear in the airport. Flights to Vladivostok began to emerge in the flight lists. ICAO category 1 standards were implemented in 1965, making way for international operations. By the late 1960s, over 60 airlines had flights to and from Leningrad airport. On 8 February 1971, Shosseynaya was awarded the Order of the October Revolution. The airport was renamed Pulkovo Airport on 24 April 1973. In May 1973, the new Pulkovo 1 terminal was opened. The 5-cup Pulkovo 1 was designed by Alexandr Zyk. The 5 cups on top were put intentionally to give the terminal a more spacious feeling and allow more natural sunlight to pass through. This terminal is regarded as a masterpiece of Soviet postmodern architecture. Pulkovo 1 was a domestic-only terminal. Domestic air traffic increased by approximately 45% every decade between the 1970-1990s. The old pre-war building of the airport was renamed Pulkovo 2 and the terminal was exploited for international flights only.

On 11 April 1986, the new departure and arrival zones for the international terminal were completed, doubling the passenger traffic rate capacity of Pulkovo 1.

=== 1986–2007 ===
In 1990, Pulkovo Airport reached its passenger traffic rate peak of over 10,000,000 passengers. After the dissolution of the Soviet Union, the number of passengers declined. In 2005, Pulkovo Airport gained independence as it separated from the Pulkovo Aviation Enterprise. Also in 2005, Rosavia declares that Pulkovo Airport (still state-owned) is to have an open tender on an investment project of the new terminal construction. This allowed it to sell shares and begin working on investment bidding projects. In 2006, Pulkovo Airport served just over 5,000,000 passengers: only 50% of the number from 1990.

=== 2007–present ===
In 2007, Grimshaw Architects was announced as the winner of the construction contract. In 2009, the Saint Petersburg Transportation Ministry requested that an operating company for Pulkovo Airport be created, and a consortium known as NCG (Northern Capital Gateway) was set up by Russian VTB Capital Bank, international Fraport AG Company, and the Greek Copelouzos Group. On 29 April 2010, NCG won the tender for a 30-year operating lease over Pulkovo Airport. On 24 November 2010, Russian Prime Minister Vladimir Putin attended a ceremony celebrating the beginning of construction on the new 150,000 m^{2} Terminal 1.

From 2020, the number of destinations is expected to increase rapidly, with up to 75% increase in passenger numbers forecast. This follows a five-year test agreement permitting non-Russian airlines to operate flights from multiple European destinations into the airport under an OpenSkies/Seventh-freedom traffic right The test follows an easing of visa requirements for many European nationals wishing to visit the St Petersburg region designed to increase tourism to the city through the airport.

On 31 January 2024, Ukrainian drones attacked an oil refinery near St. Petersburg. The Ukrainian drones and Russian air defence missiles fired to stop the attack led to all flights from the Pulkovo airport being suspended between 3:53 a.m. and 5:11 a.m.

== Terminals ==
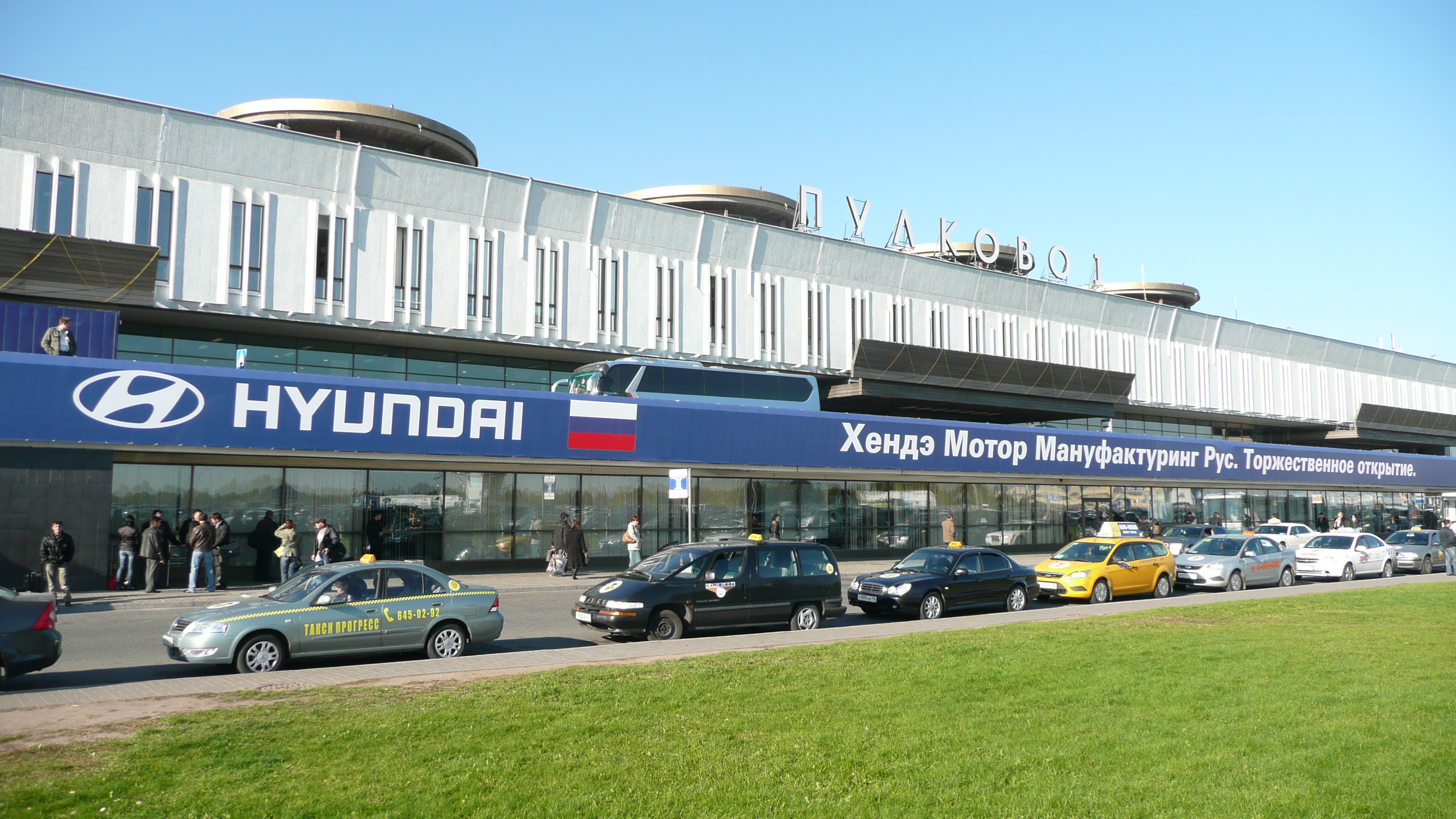
Exterior of old terminal 1

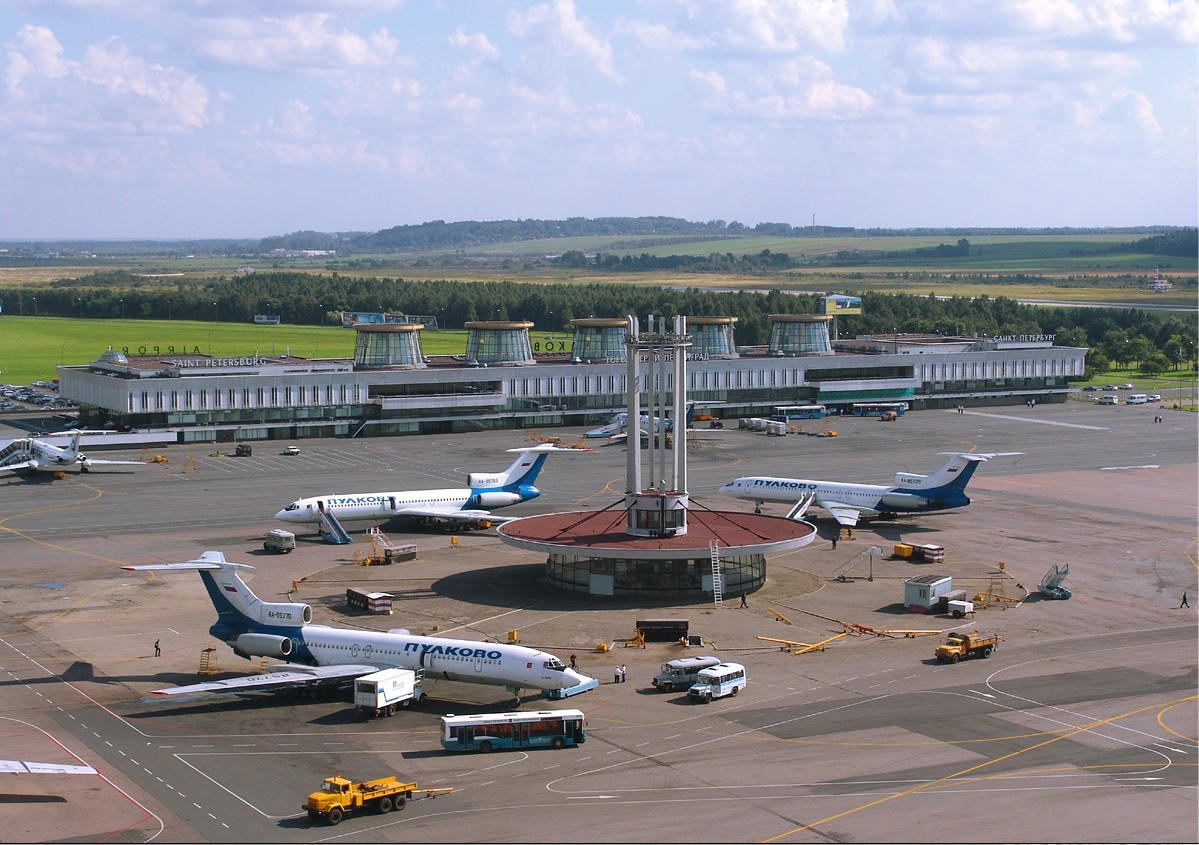
View of the taxiways

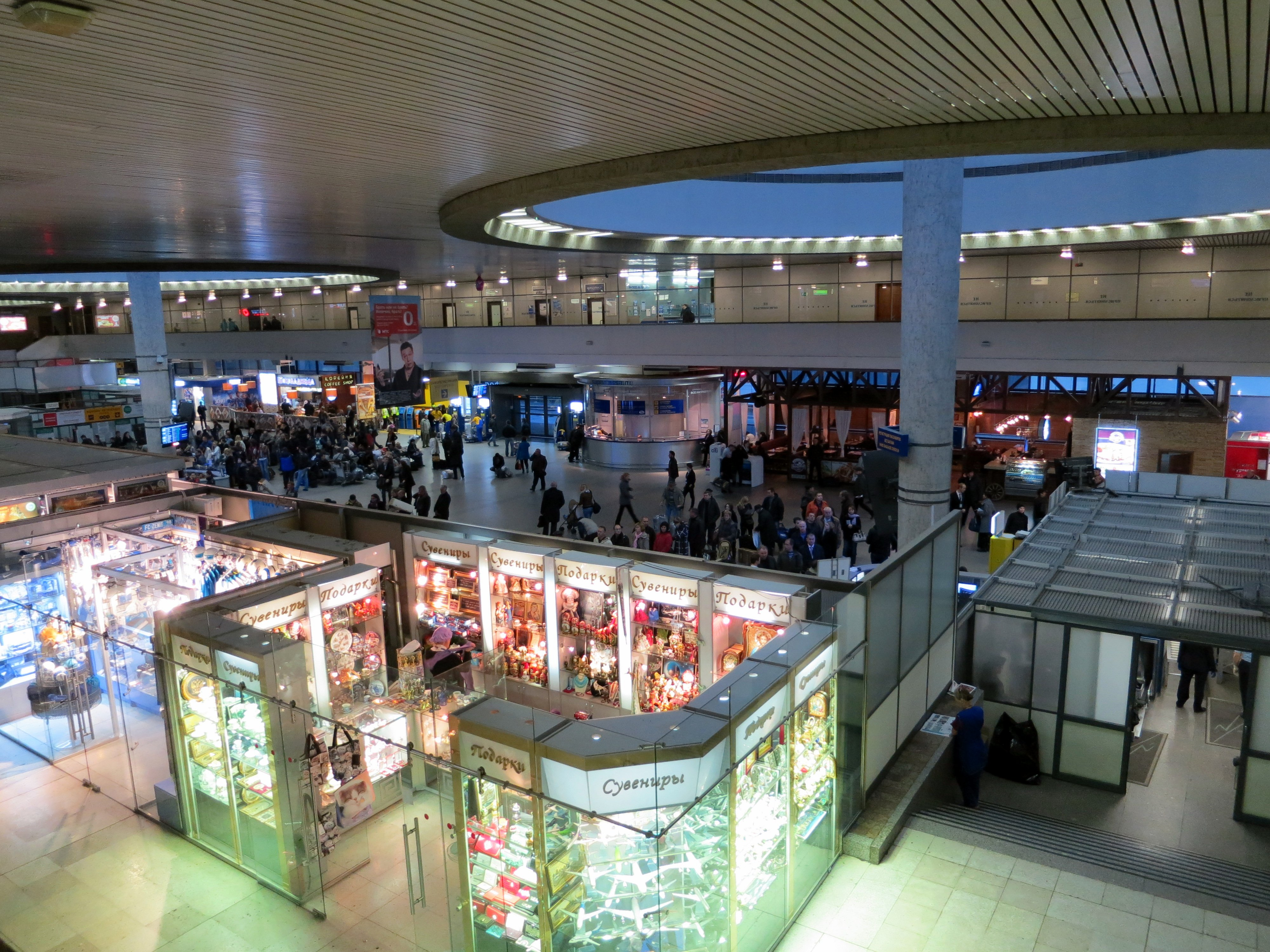
Duty-free area of terminal 1

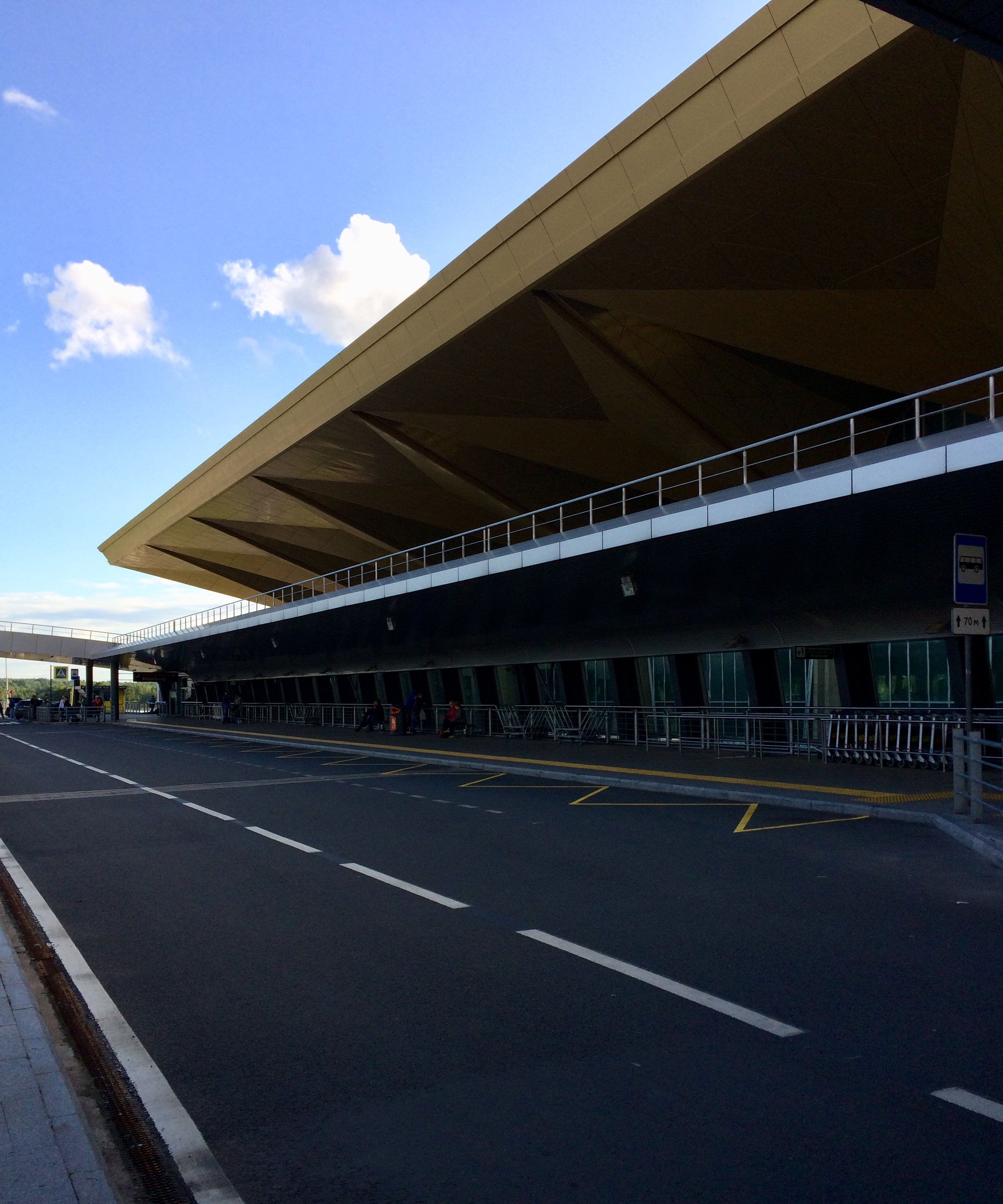
New terminal exterior

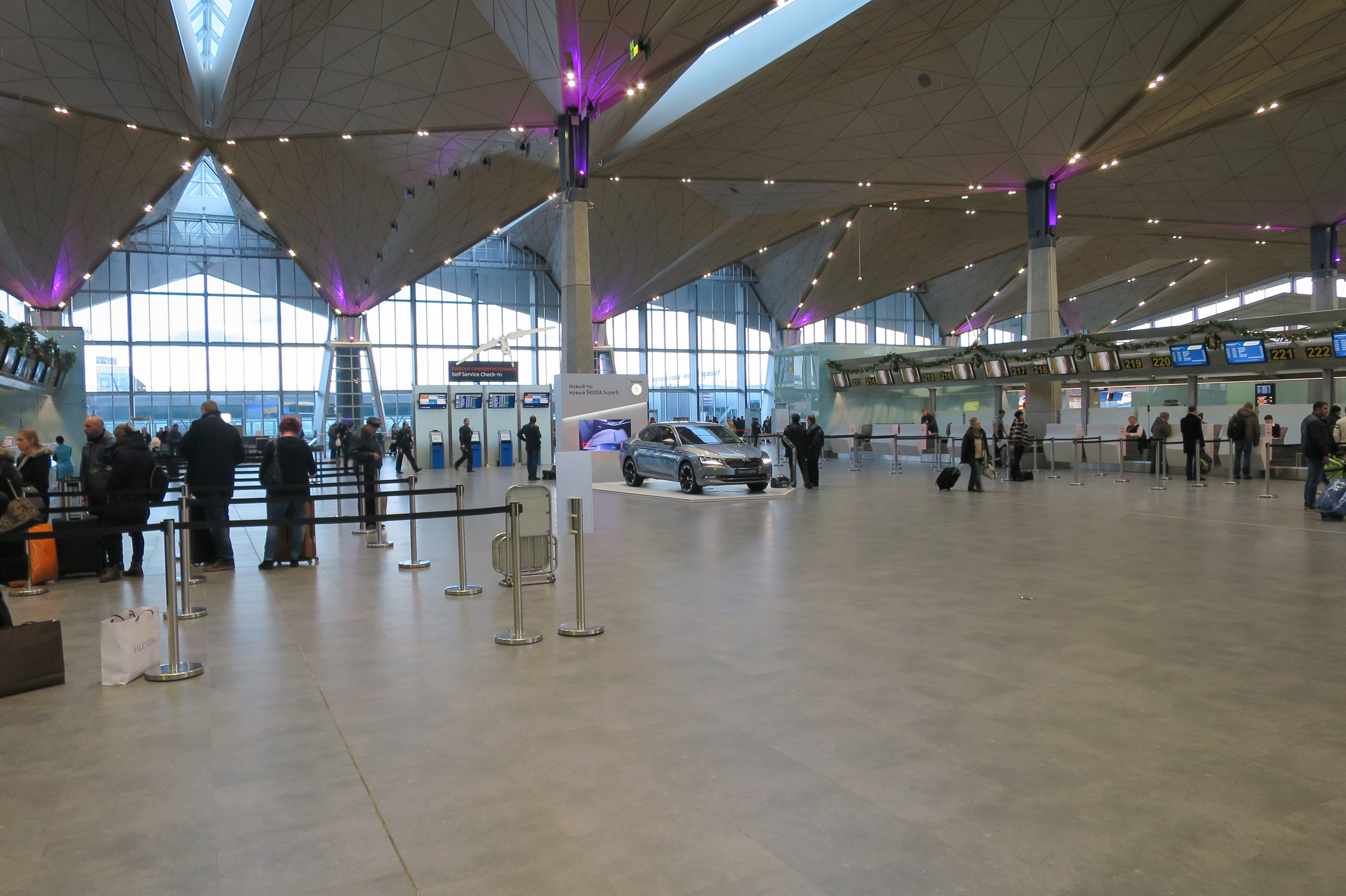
New departure hall interior

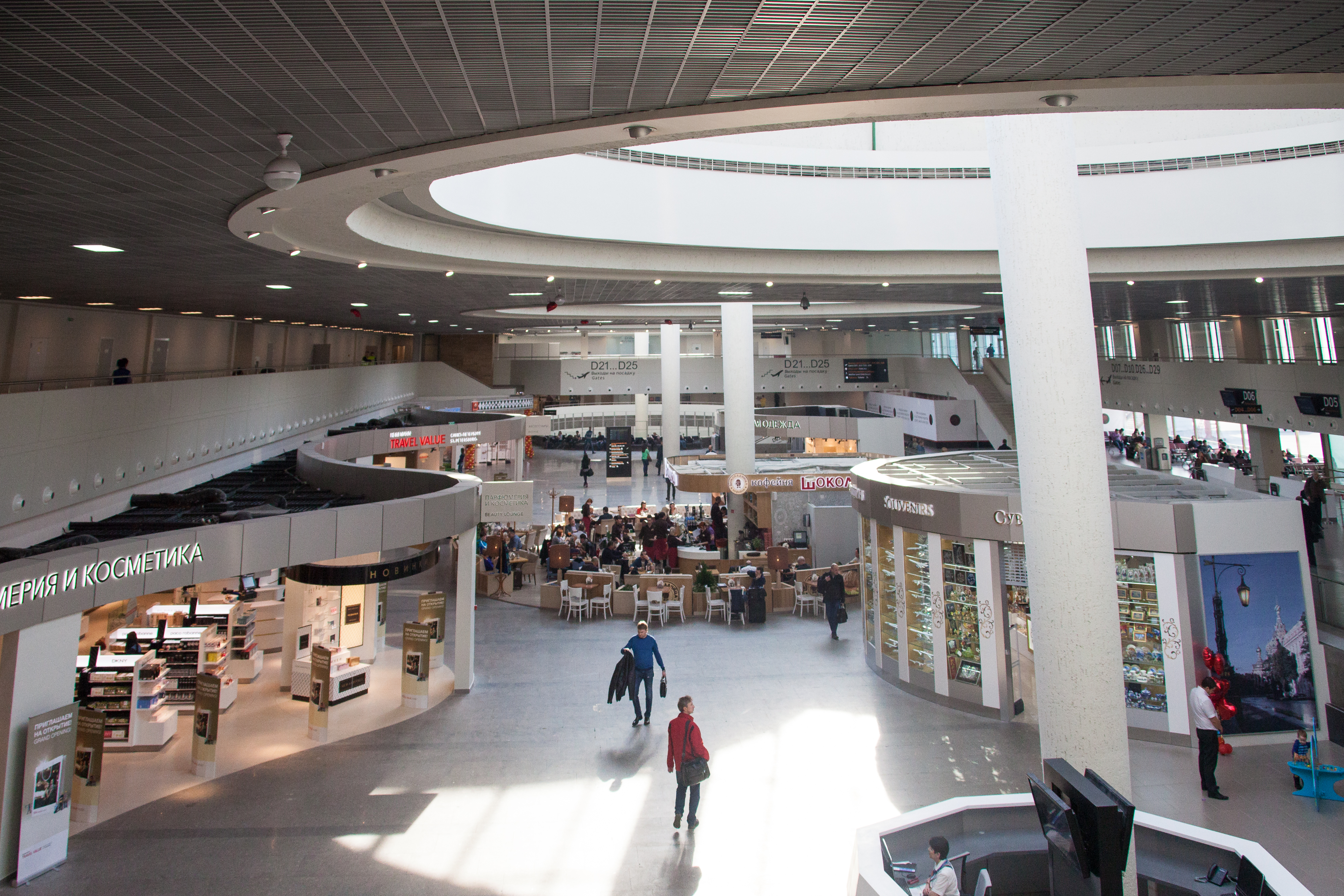
Terminal 1 interior after renovation

=== Pulkovo 1 ===
This historic terminal, opened in 1973, is 43,000 m^{2} (460,000 sq ft). It was built for 6,500,000 passengers annually, but by 2008 it surpassed its maximum capacity. Since its reconstruction was completed in 2014, this terminal is now used for all passenger flights, domestic and international. It has several duty-free shops, restaurants, and six jet bridges. It was reported that when the reconstruction of Pulkovo 1 is completed, Pulkovo Airport's capacity would increase to 17,000,000 passengers annually.

=== Terminal 1 ===
Construction of Terminal 1 was delayed several times but finally began in 2010. In November 2013, the airport was tested for errors by over 5,200 residents of Saint Petersburg who partook in the process. Several days after the test, the new Terminal 1 opened on December 3, 2013. On February 14, 2014, all operations were consolidated into the new terminal as the old Pulkovo 1 and Pulkovo 2 terminals have been shut down. The new terminal contains several business lounges, restaurants, pharmacies. Terminal 1 is 147,000 m^{2} (1,580,000 sq ft) and has 400,000 m^{2} (4,310,000 sq ft) airport dock in front of it. The airport has 88 check-in counters, 110 passport booths, 7 baggage carousels, 110 parking stands, 17 gates, and 17 escalators. The interior of the new airport was designed by Grimshaw Architects and directly correlates with the designs and style of Saint Petersburg city. The new Terminal also sought many artistic sculptures and paintings to give a sense of thriving culture to passengers. Four sculptures from Dmitry Shorin's project named I Believe in Angels decorate the departure hall.

The current Pulkovo-1 terminal includes the new terminal and the old Soviet terminal that was re-constructed and fully converted into the departure area.

== Airlines and destinations ==
Due to the impact on aviation because of the 2022 Russian invasion of Ukraine, destinations to the European Union, United Kingdom, Switzerland, Iceland, Norway, North America, Australasia, Singapore, Northeast Asia and Taiwan are suspended until further notice.

Airlines	Destinations
Aeroflot	Krasnodar, Moscow–Sheremetyevo, Vladivostok, Yerevan; Seasonal: Antalya, Bangkok–Suvarnabhumi, Hurghada, Phuket, Sanya, Sharm El Sheikh
Air Cairo	Seasonal charter: Sharm El Sheikh
Air Serbia	Belgrade
AJet	Ankara, Istanbul–Sabiha Gökçen
AlMasria Universal Airlines	Seasonal charter: Hurghada, Sharm El Sheikh
Alrosa	Moscow–Vnukovo
Avia Traffic Company	Bishkek, Osh
Azerbaijan Airlines	Baku; Seasonal: Ganja
Azimuth	Kaluga (suspended until 23 March 2027), Moscow–Vnukovo, Saransk, Tbilisi
Azur Air	Seasonal charter: Colombo–Bandaranaike
Belavia	Brest, Homiel, Minsk
Centrum Air	Namangan, Samarqand, Tashkent, Urgench
China Eastern Airlines	Shanghai–Pudong
Emirates	Dubai–International
Etihad Airways	Abu-Dhabi
flydubai	Dubai–International
FlyOne	Yerevan
Georgian Airways	Tbilisi
Hainan Airlines	Beijing–Capital
Ikar	Ivanovo, Izhevsk, Kurgan, Orsk; Seasonal charter: Nha Trang, Phuket
Iran Airtour	Seasonal: Tehran–Imam Khomeini
Kostroma Air Enterprise	Kostroma
Mahan Air	Tehran–Imam Khomeini
Meraj Airlines	Seasonal: Tehran–Imam Khomeini
Nesma Airlines	Seasonal charter: Hurghada
NordStar	Norilsk; Seasonal: Abakan
Nordwind Airlines	Barnaul, Kaliningrad, Kazan, Kemerovo, Krasnoyarsk-International, Magnitogorsk, Moscow–Sheremetyevo, Novokuznetsk, Omsk, Orenburg, Samara, Sochi, Tomsk, Tyumen, Ufa
Nouvelair	Seasonal: Monastir
Pyramids Airlines	Seasonal charter: Monastir
Pegasus Airlines	Antalya, Istanbul–Sabiha Gökçen
Pobeda	Astrakhan, Cheboksary, Chelyabinsk, Izhevsk, Kaliningrad, Kirov, Krasnodar, Makhachkala, Minsk, Moscow–Sheremetyevo, Moscow–Vnukovo, Nalchik, Nizhnekamsk, Perm, Samara, Saratov, Stavropol, Ulyanovsk–Baratayevka, Vladikavkaz, Volgograd, Yekaterinburg
Qanot Sharq	Bukhara, Namangan, Samarqand, Tashkent, Termez
Red Wings Airlines	Batumi, Kaluga, Saransk, Tbilisi
Rossiya Airlines	Almaty, Apatity/Kirovsk, Arkhangelsk–Talagi, Astana Baku, Chelyabinsk, Gelendzhik, Gorno-Altaysk, Grozny, Irkutsk, Istanbul, Kaliningrad, Kazan, Krasnodar, Krasnoyarsk–International, Makhachkala, Mineralnye Vody, Moscow–Sheremetyevo, Moscow–Vnukovo, Murmansk, Nizhnevartovsk, Nizhny Novgorod, Novosibirsk, Omsk, Orenburg, Penza, Perm, Samara, Samarqand, Sochi, Surgut, Syktyvkar, Tashkent, Tyumen, Ufa, Volgograd, Yekaterinburg, Yerevan
Royal Air Maroc	Casablanca
RusLine	Ivanovo, Khanty-Mansiysk, Naryan-Mar, Tambov, Yaroslavl, Yoshkar-Ola (suspended)
S7 Airlines	Gorno-Altaysk, Irkutsk, Moscow–Domodedovo, Novosibirsk
SCAT Airlines	Astana, Şymkent
Severstal Avia	Cherepovets, Ukhta; Seasonal: Sovetsky
Sichuan Airlines	Chengdu–Tianfu
Sky Vision Airlines	Seasonal charter: Sharm El Sheikh
Smartavia	Arkhangelsk–Talagi, Chelyabinsk, Kaliningrad, Kazan, Krasnodar, Moscow–Sheremetyevo, Murmansk, Nizhny Novgorod, Novosibirsk, Samara, Sochi, Syktyvkar, Ufa, Yekaterinburg; Seasonal: Gelendzhik, Mineralnye Vody, Orenburg, Perm, Tyumen, Volgograd
Somon Air	Dushanbe, Khujand
Southwind Airlines	Seasonal charter: Antalya
Turkish Airlines	Istanbul; Seasonal charter: Antalya, Bodrum, Dalaman
Ural Airlines	Dushanbe, Kaliningrad, Khujand, Kulob, Osh, Sochi, Yekaterinburg
Utair	Baku, Gelendzhik, Moscow–Vnukovo, Samarqand, Surgut, Tyumen
UVT Aero	Tobolsk
Uzbekistan Airways	Andizhan, Bukhara, Fergana, Namangan, Qarshi, Samarqand, Tashkent, Termez, Urgench
Vologda Aviation Enterprise	Vologda
Yakutia Airlines	Yakutsk
Yamal Airlines	Nadym, Novy Urengoy, Noyabrsk, Salekhard

== Statistics ==
=== Annual traffic ===
Annual passenger traffic
Year	Passengers	% change
2004	4,337,749	Steady
2005	4,654,405	▲7.3%
2006	5,101,842	▲9.6%
2007	6,137,805	▲20.3%
2008	7,071,537	▲15.2%
2009	6,758,352	▼4.4%
2010	8,443,753	▲24.9%
2011	9,610,767	▲13.8%
2012	11,154,560	▲16.1%
2013	12,854,366	▲15.2%
2014	14,264,732	▲11.0%
2015	13,500,125	▼5.3%
2016	13,300,000	▼1.4%
2017	16,125,520	▲21.2%
2018	18,122,286	▲12.4%
2019	19,581,262	▲8.1%
2020	10,944,421	▼45.1%
2021	18,043,464	▲64.8%
2022	18,140,100	▲0.6%
2023	20,400,000	▲12.1%
2024	20,900,000	▲2.5%

=== Route statistics ===
Busiest domestic routes at Pulkovo Airport (by number of passengers) 2019
Rank	City	Region	Airports	Number of passengers
1	Moscow	Moscow; Moscow Oblast	Domodedovo, Sheremetyevo, Vnukovo	5,051,518
2	Sochi	Krasnodar Krai	Adler–Sochi International Airport	567,827
3	Kaliningrad	Kaliningrad Oblast	Khrabrovo Airport	511,520
4	Yekaterinburg	Sverdlovsk Oblast	Koltsovo Airport	417,011
5	Krasnodar	Krasnodar Krai	Pashkovsky Airport	409,758
6	Novosibirsk	Novosibirsk Oblast	Tolmachevo Airport	382,849
7	Arkhangelsk	Arkhangelsk Oblast	Talagi Airport	329,233
8	Rostov-on-Don	Rostov Oblast	Rostov-on-Don Airport	308,118
9	Murmansk	Murmansk Oblast	Murmansk Airport	306,564

Busiest CIS routes at Pulkovo Airport (by number of passengers) 2019
Rank	City	Country	Airports	Number of passengers
1	Minsk	Belarus	Minsk National Airport	292,044
2	Tashkent	Uzbekistan	Tashkent International Airport	132,785
3	Samarkand	Uzbekistan	Samarkand Airport	100,255
4	Chișinău	Moldova	Chișinău International Airport	95,698
5	Dushanbe	Tajikistan	Dushanbe International Airport	86,430
6	Almaty	Kazakhstan	Almaty International Airport	82,605
7	Yerevan	Armenia	Zvartnots International Airport	60,570
8	Urgench	Uzbekistan	Urgench International Airport	57,274
9	Nur-Sultan	Kazakhstan	Nursultan Nazarbayev International Airport	52,319
10	Osh	Kyrgyzstan	Osh Airport	51,593

Busiest international routes at Pulkovo Airport (by number of passengers) 2019
Rank	City	Country	Airports	Number of passengers
1	Antalya	Turkey	Antalya Airport	893,927
2	Frankfurt	Germany	Frankfurt Airport	273,017
3	Munich	Germany	Munich Airport	248,291
4	Paris	France	Charles de Gaulle Airport	245,952
5	Larnaca	Cyprus	Larnaca International Airport	225,943
6	Helsinki	Finland	Helsinki Airport	209,890
7	Riga	Latvia	Riga International Airport	194,248
8	Prague	Czech Republic	Václav Havel Airport Prague	186,845
9	Dubai	United Arab Emirates	Dubai International Airport	186,428
10	Rome–Fiumicino	Italy	Leonardo Da Vinci International Airport	169,637

== Investors ==
Northern Capital Gateway (NCG) began managing the airport in 2009.

The airport's website lists the companies currently participating alongside NCG:

"Russian VTB Capital, member of state-owned VTB Group, German Fraport, which manages and operates the airport of Frankfurt and many other international airports, and Horizon Air Investments S.A. member of the Greek Copelouzos Group".

Although not yet listed on the website, the latest investor is Qatar Investment Authority (QIA), which now owns a 25% share of the Pulkovo Airport. Sheikh Ahmed Al-Thani, vice chairman of QIA and member of Qatar's ruling Al-Thani family, is now listed as a member of the Board of Directors on the Pulkovo airport's website, along with Arturo Carta of QIA.

In November 2023, Russian President Vladimir Putin signed a decree temporarily removing foreign investors from managing the airport. They will retain their shares, but the votes will be controlled by two Russian companies - NCG Holding and Advanced Industrial and Infrastructure Technologies-7.

In 2025, Fraport sold its 25% shareholding to Orbital Aviation.

== Ground transportation ==
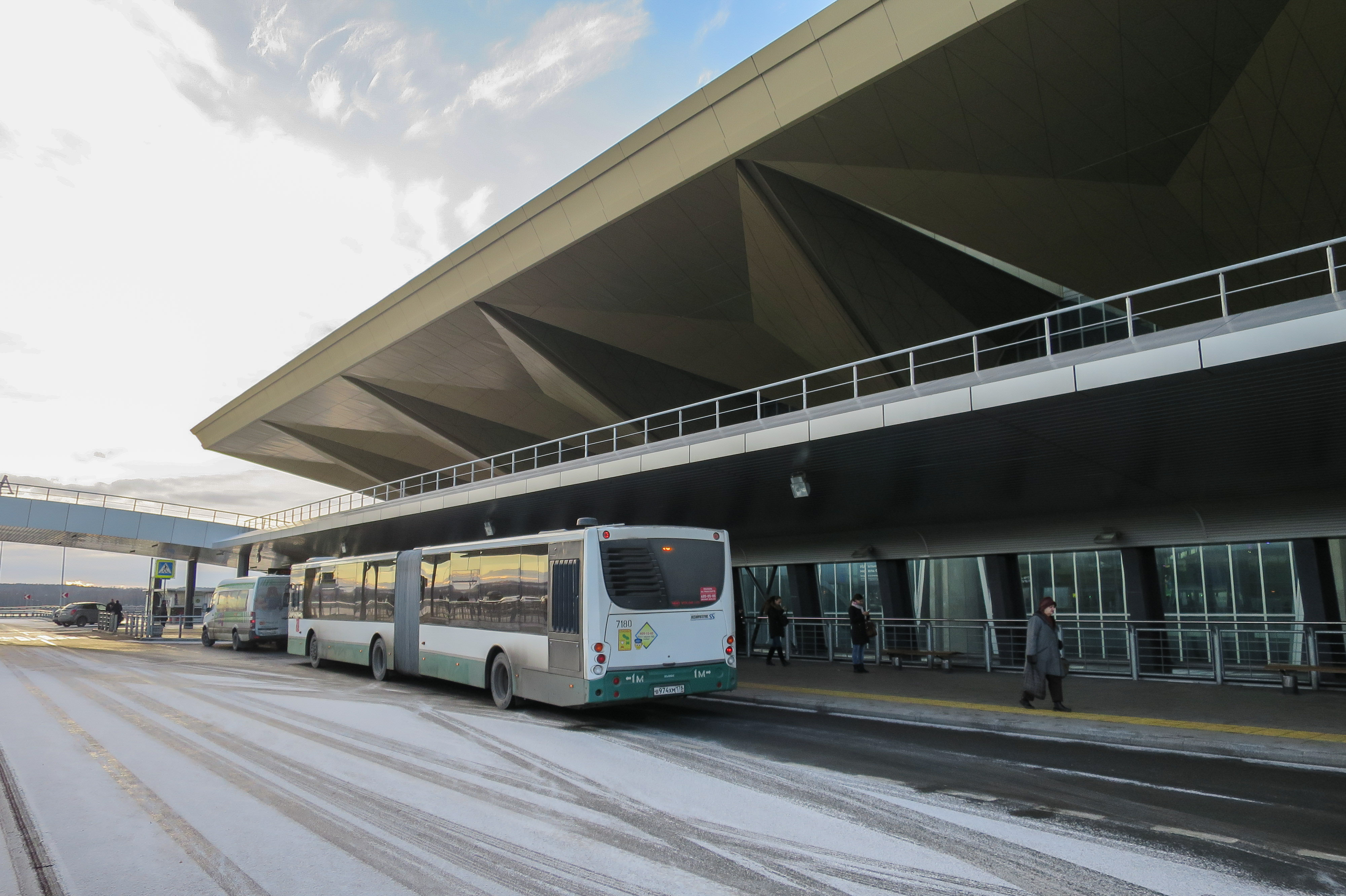
Bus near Terminal 1

Pulkovo Airport is served by the city buses:

- No.39 and No.39Ex. to the metro station "Moskovskaya" on line M2
- No. 82Ex. to the metro station "Prospekt Veteranov" on line M1

For private car travel, Pulkovo Airport is accessible via the nearby Pulkovo Highway (Pulkovskoe shosse) from Saint Petersburg city center.

== Accidents and incidents ==
- On 27 April 1974, an Ilyushin Il-18V passenger aircraft of Aeroflot flying to Krasnodar crashed right after takeoff from Pulkovo after an engine fire. All 108 passengers and 10 crew members died. It eventually came to be known as the 1974 Leningrad Aeroflot Il-18 crash.
- On 20 October 2025, an Airbus A320 operated by Azerbaijan Airlines skidded off the airport runway while performing an emergency landing shortly after it took off from Pulkovo on its way to Baku due to a landing gear malfunction, resulting in the evacuation of all 155 passengers.

== See also ==
- List of the busiest airports in Russia
- List of the busiest airports in Europe
- List of the busiest airports in the former USSR
