= Avdeyevo, Republic of Karelia =

Avdeyevo Авдеево
- Village
- Location within Karelia Location within Russia
- Coordinates: 62°00′N 36°03′E
- Country: Russia
- Region: Republic of Karelia
- District: Pudozhsky District
- Time zone: UTC+3:00

Avdeyevo (Russian: Авдеево) is a rural locality (a village) and the administrative center of Avdeyevskoye Rural Settlement of Pudozhsky District, Republic of Karelia, Russia. The population was 361 as of 2013.

== Geography ==
Avdeyevo is located 36 km northwest of Pudozh (the district's administrative centre) by road. Burakovo is the nearest rural locality.

== History ==
The village was the administrative center of the Avdeevskaya volost of the Pudozhsky Uyezd of the Olonets Governorate, famous for its storytellers N. A. Remezov, I. T. Fofanov, N. V. Kigachev — participants of the All-Karelian Congress of Storytellers in Petrozavodsk in 1939.

== Attractions ==
The village preserves a Mass grave of soviet soldiers, partisans and rural activists.
