= Ileksa =

- Native name: Илекса (Russian)

Location
- Country: Russia

Physical characteristics
- Mouth: Lake Vodlozero
  - coordinates: 62°28′52″N 36°55′18″E
  - elevation: 136 metres (446 ft)
- Length: 155 km (96 mi)
- Basin size: 3,950 km^{2} (1,530 sq mi)
- Discharge
  - average: 11 cubic metres per second (390 cu ft/s)—137 cubic metres per second (4,800 cu ft/s)

Basin features
- Progression: Lake Vodlozero→ Vama→ Vodla→ Lake Onega→ Svir→ Lake Ladoga→ Neva→ Gulf of Finland

The Ileksa (Russian: Илекса) is a river in Onezhsky District of Arkhangelsk Oblast and Pudozhsky District of the Republic of Karelia in Russia. It is the principal tributary of Lake Vodlozero, and thus belongs to the basins of Lake Onega and of the Baltic Sea. It is 155 kilometres (96 mi) long, and the area of its basin 3,950 square kilometres (1,530 sq mi). The main tributary of the Ileksa is the Chusreka (left).

Ileksa is part of major waterway, which starts as the Verkhnyaya, which is a tributary of Lake Kalgachinskoye, and continues as the Vodla (which flows out of Lake Vodlozero) to Lake Onega, further as the Svir to Lake Ladoga, and further as the Neva to the Gulf of Finland of the Baltic Sea. The Ileksa connects lakes Kalgachinskoye and Vodlozero. The course of the river passes a number of lakes, the biggest of which are Lake Monastyrskoye, Lake Ik, and Lake Luzskoye, all located in Arkhangelsk Oblast close to the border with Karelia. There are many rapids on the Ileksa.

The river flows in the coniferous forest (taiga). Until the 1990s, the Ileksa was used for timber rafting. There is currently no population along the Ileksa.

Almost all of the valley of the Ileksa belongs to the Vodlozersky National Park, shared by Arkhangelsk Oblast and the Republic of Karelia. The park was established in 1991 to protect the taiga, coniferous forests. Since 2001, the National Park has the status of the UNESCO Biosphere Reserve, the first one in Russia.
