= Alexei Fofanov =

Soviet military commander (1915–1986)

Alexei Ivanovich Fofanov
- Алексей Иванович Фофанов
- Born: May 15, 1915; Klimovskaya, Pudozhsky Uyezd, Olonets Governorate, Russian Empire
- Died: 4 September 1986 (aged 71); Kiev, Soviet Union
- Military career
- Allegiance: Soviet Union
- Service years: 1937–1960
- Rank: Major
- Unit: Armoured warfare
- Conflicts: World War II; Winter War; Eastern Front
- Awards: Hero of the Soviet Union; Order of Lenin; Order of the Red Banner; Order of the Patriotic War

Alexei Ivanovich Fofanov (Russian: Алексей Иванович Фофанов; 15 May 1915 – 4 September 1986) was a Soviet major and Hero of the Soviet Union. He was commander of a tank company of the 344th Tank Battalion of the 91st Tank Brigade of the 3rd Guards Tank Army of the 1st Ukrainian Front, senior lieutenant.

== Life ==
Alexei Ivanovich Fofanov was born into the family of the famous epic storyteller Ivan Terentyevich Fofanov. In 1934-1936, he studied at the Petrozavodsk Cooperative Technical School and worked as an assistant to the chief accountant of the district consumer union in Pudozh.

In 1937, Fofanov he was drafted into the Red Army and served in the tank forces. In 1939, he graduated from the school for junior commanders. He participated in the Winter War. In 1941, he was accepted as a member of the All-Union Communist Party (Bolsheviks).

From June 1941, on the fronts of the Great Patriotic War, Fofanov participated in defensive battles in Ukraine and in the battle of Moscow, took part in the crossing of the Dnieper, and the Second Battle of Kiev. On 7 November 1943, the tank company under the command of Fofanov command was the first to break into the city of Fastov. During the battle, his tank destroyed five anti-tank guns, four machine guns, and captured three anti-aircraft guns, a T-6 Tiger tank, and three enemy vehicles.

Fofanov was nominated for the title of Hero of the Soviet Union for his skillful command of a company and personal heroism and courage. By the Decree of the Presidium of the Supreme Soviet of the USSR "On conferring the title of Hero of the Soviet Union on generals, officers, sergeants and privates of the Red Army" of 10 January 1944, for "exemplary performance of combat missions of the command on the front in the fight against the Nazi invaders and the courage and heroism displayed in doing so," he was awarded the title of Hero of the Soviet Union and the Order of Lenin and the Gold Star medal.

After the war, Fofanov worked in the internal affairs and state security agencies of the Karelo-Finnish Soviet Socialist Republic.

From 1958, Fofanov lived in Kiev. In 1960, he retired with the rank of major.

Fofanov died on 4 September 1986 in Kiev and was buried at Lesnoye Cemetery.

== Legacy ==
Fofanov's portrait and name are carved in the Gallery of Heroes of the Soviet Union - natives of Karelia in Petrozavodsk. In the city of Fastov, a street was named in honor of Fofanov.
