= Krasnoborsky =

Krasnoborsky (masculine), Krasnoborskaya (feminine), or Krasnoborskoye (neuter) may refer to:

- Krasnoborsky District, a district of Arkhangelsk Oblast, Russia
- Krasnoborsky (rural locality) (Krasnoborskaya, Krasnoborskoye), name of several rural localities in Russia
