= List of airlines of Uzbekistan =

This is a list of airlines currently operating in Uzbekistan.

== Scheduled airlines ==
Airline	Image	IATA	ICAO	Fleet	Founded	Type
Air Samarkand		9S	UZS	A321; A21N; A330	2022	Scheduled
Centrum Air		C6	MFX	A320; A32N; A21N; A330	2023	Low-Cost
Flykhiva	Boeing 757-300 TF-FIX of FlyKhiva (operated by Icelandair) departing from Tashkent Airport	2U	FKH	B767F B753	2021	Freighter, Scheduled
FlyOne Asia		7Q	AUV	A320	2025	Low-Cost
My Freighter		C6	MFX	A320F; A21NF; B747F; B767F	2021	Freighter
Qanot Sharq		HH	QNT	A320 A321; A21N; A330	1998	Scheduled
Silk Avia		US	USA	ATR-72	2021	Regional
SpaceBee Airlines		Y3	UZU	B767F	2022	Freighter
Tashkent Air			TSK	A330	2022	Long-Haul
Uzbekistan Airways		HY	UZB	A20N; A21N; A320 A321; A330; B767; B767F; B787	1992	Flag Carrier

== See also ==
- List of airlines
- List of defunct airlines of Uzbekistan
- List of defunct airlines of Asia
