= Samarkand International Airport =

International airport in Uzbekistan

Samarkand International Airport Samarqand xalqaro aeroporti (Uzbek)

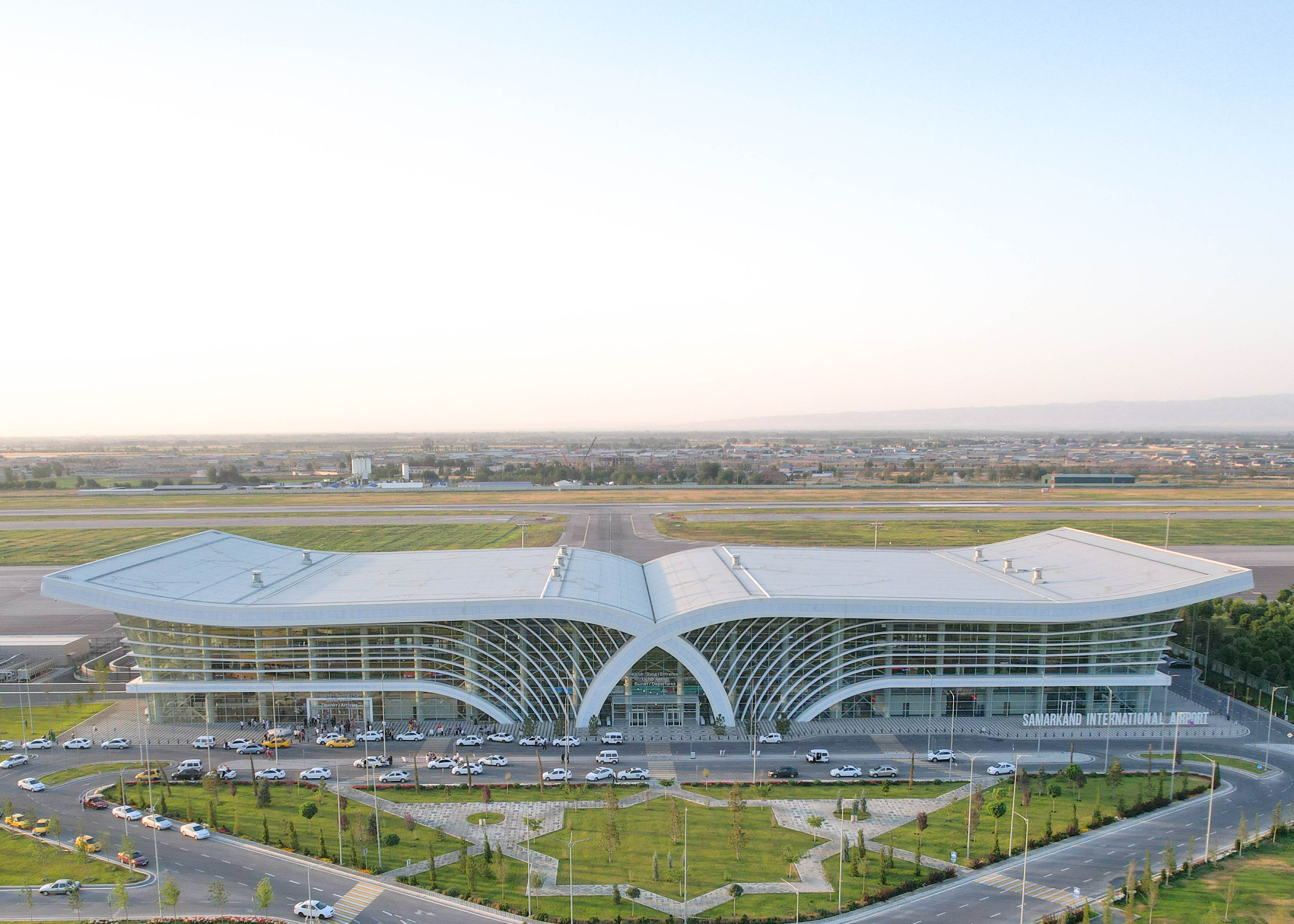
- IATA: SKD; ICAO: UZSS

Summary
- Airport type: Public
- Owner: Bakhtiyor Fazilov
- Operator: Air Marakanda
- Serves: Samarkand, Samarqand Region
- Location: Samarkand, Uzbekistan
- Opened: 1967
- Hub for: Air Samarkand
- Focus city for: Uzbekistan Airways; Silk Avia
- Time zone: (UTC+05:00)
- Elevation AMSL: 2,224 ft (678 m)
- Coordinates: 39°42′02″N 66°59′02″E
- Website: Official website

Map
- Location of air base in Uzbekistan

Runways
Direction	Length		Surface
Direction	ft	m	Surface
09/27	10,170	3,100	Asphalt

Statistics (2025)
- Passengers: ▲1,521,158
- Samarkand International Airport

Samarkand International Airport (Note: Uzbek: Samarqand xalqaro aeroporti, cyrillized: Самарқанд халқаро аэропорти) (IATA: SKD, ICAO: UZSS) is an airport of entry in Samarkand, Uzbekistan, 6 kilometres (3.7 mi) from the city center. The airport has been operated by Uzbekistan Airways since the airline's creation in 1992. The airport has domestic as well as international flights and is the second-largest airport in Uzbekistan after Tashkent International Airport. The airport operates flights across Asia, Europe, and the Middle East. It also serves as a hub for Air Samarkand.

Samarkand International Airport is located on the northern outskirts of Samarkand at an altitude of 680 meters above sea level.

== History ==
Samarkand International Airport is the first airport in the modern history of Uzbekistan. The initial facilities for the airport were constructed in 1967, including a runway, a small terminal, and basic infrastructure. In its early years, the airport mostly operated domestic charter flights, until the first scheduled flights began in the 1980s. The national airline Uzbekistan Airways started operating flights to the airport after its establishment in 1992, contributing to an increase in passenger traffic.

A new passenger terminal was built in 2009, taxiways were reconstructed, a new air traffic control building was constructed, and modern aeronautical navigation equipment was installed.

=== Renovation ===
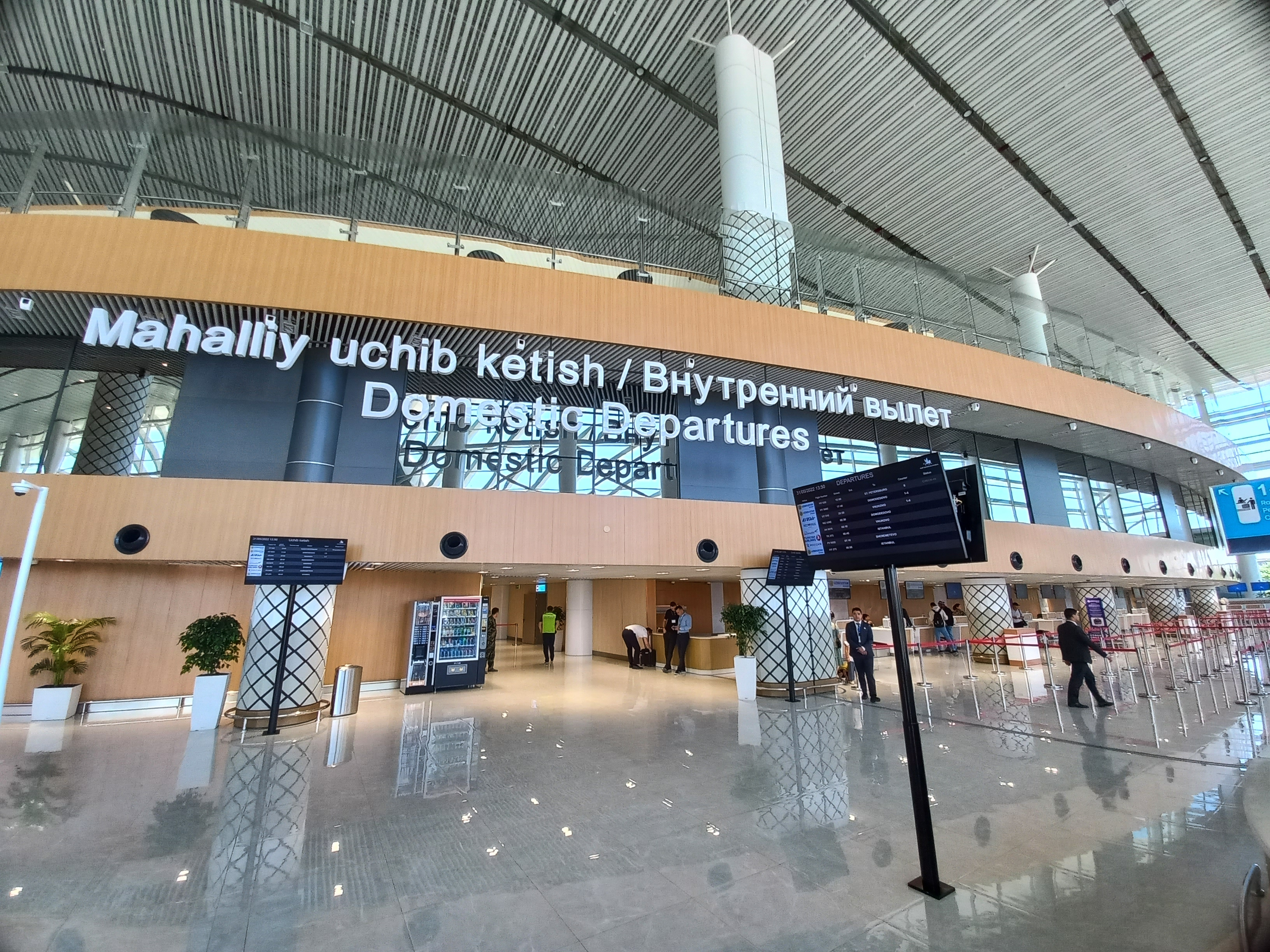
Domestic departures zone

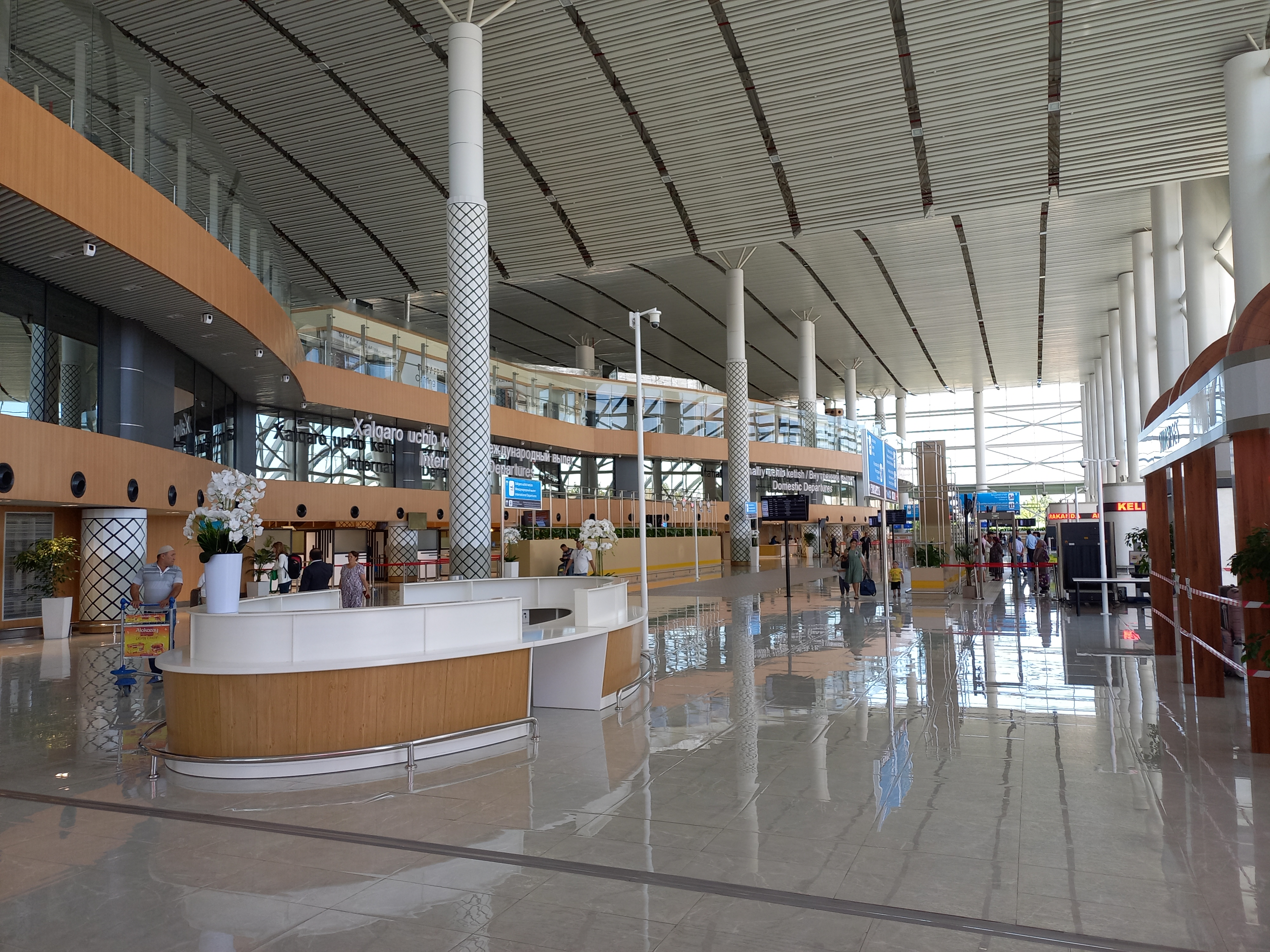
Samarkand International Airport interior

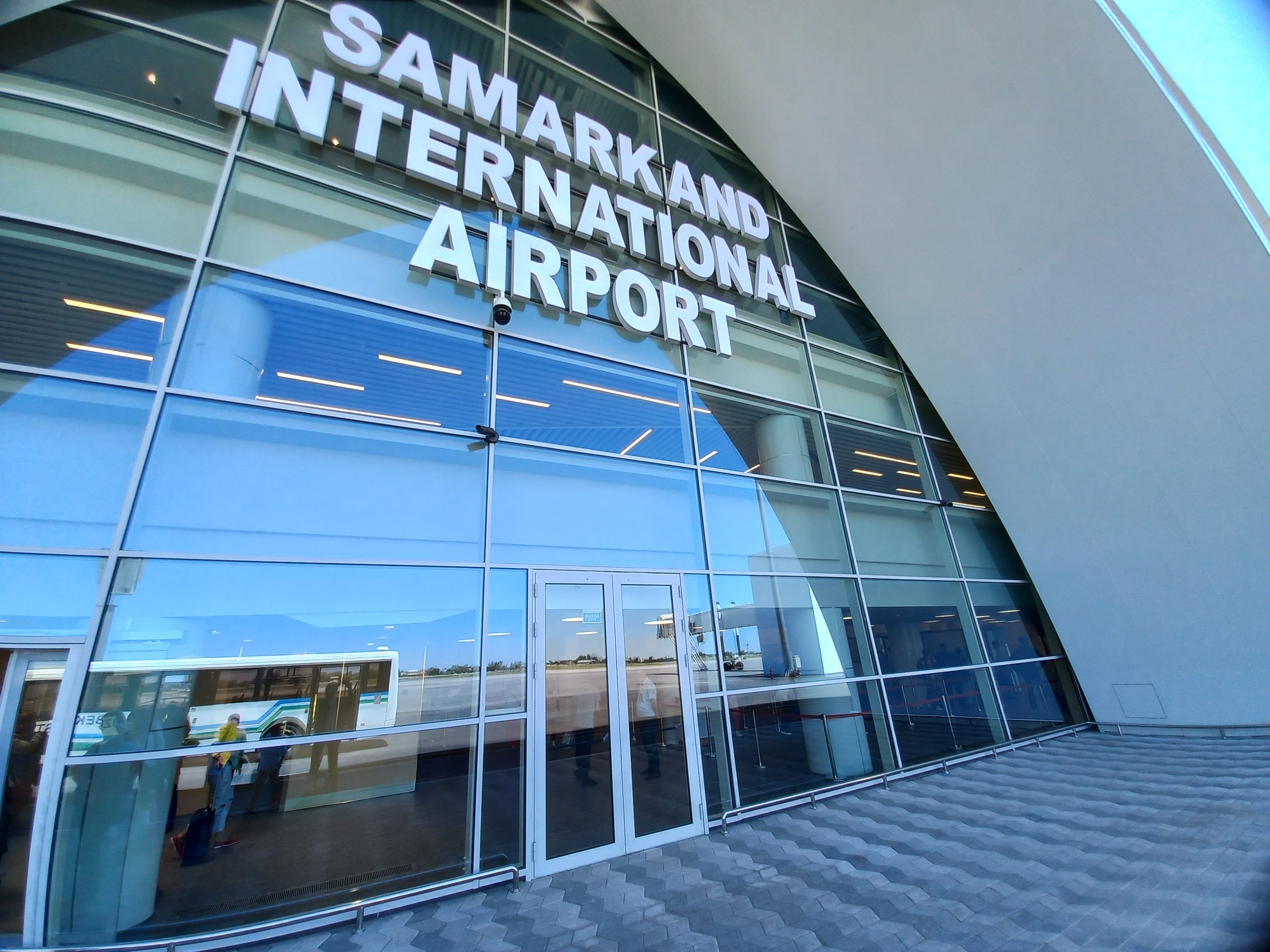
Entrance from airfield

On 27 November 2018, Uzbek President Shavkat Mirziyoyev signed a decree aimed at improving and modernizing the country's civil aviation sector. In 2020, a comprehensive renovation and construction of a new terminal began. The Uzbek Uzbekistan EPC company Enter Engineering carried out the project based on a design by the Turkish design firm Kiklop Construction. The new terminal officially opened on 18 March 2022.

To enhance Uzbekistan's tourism potential, fully use the capabilities of Samarkand International Airport, and foster competition in the aviation market, an open skies regime was introduced at Samarkand International Airport on 1 October 2022.

In 2022, nine new airlines, including five foreign carriers, began operating flights to Samarkand. Among them were Jazeera Airways, Pobeda, Panorama Airways, China Southern, Silk Avia, Humo Air, Centrum Air, SunExpress, and UVT Aero.

In 2023, the airport served 1.01 million passengers. It is one of the busiest airports in Uzbekistan. International flights accounted for 918,500 passengers (a 106.4% increase), while domestic routes handled 92,300 passengers (91.2% growth). The most popular regional destination was Tashkent.

In 2024, Samarkand International Airport set a new record with over 1.38 million passengers, up 37% from 2023. Growth was driven by international routes, which saw a 43% increase and over 1.31 million passengers. New routes launched in 2024 included Xi’an (China), Sharm El-Sheikh (Egypt), Turkistan (Kazakhstan), and Tyumen, Nizhny Novgorod, Irkutsk (Russia).

== New Terminal ==
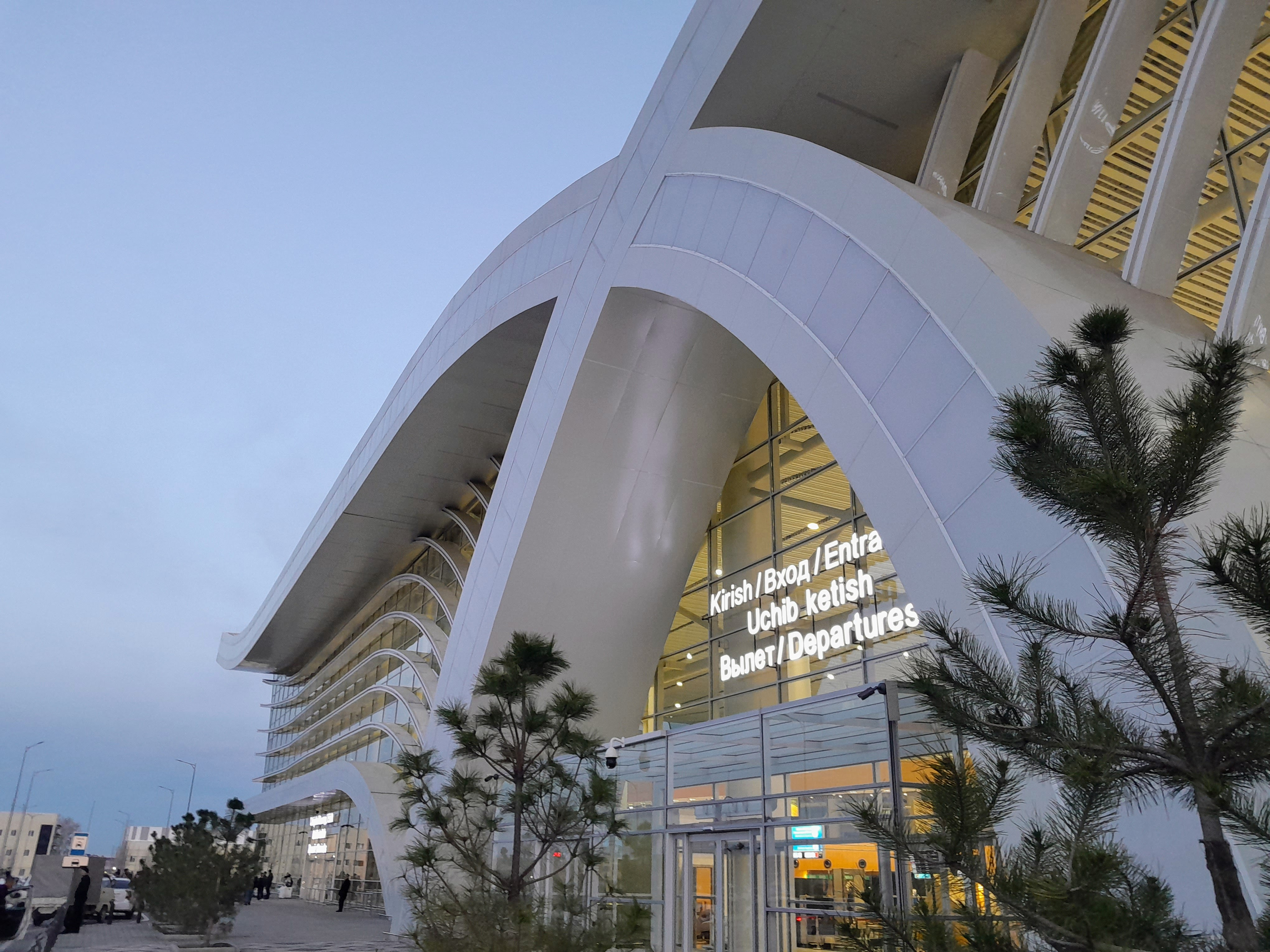
Samarkand International Airport entrance

The new terminal was officially inaugurated on 18 March 2022, with the first flight being HY-045/046 from Tashkent. Weekly flights increased from 40 to approximately 120. During the renovation, 24 new parking stands for all types of aircraft were constructed, along with eight gates. Additionally, 29 check-in desks, 10 passport control counters, and six e-gates were added for departing passengers.

With a total area of 41,216m^{2}, the terminal's capacity expanded from handling 300 to 1,000 passengers per hour, with annual passenger volume expected to grow from 460,000 to 2 million. The design resembles an open book, inspired by the astronomer Ulugh Beg. The roof is designed to resemble a star chart.

The airport complex offers all types of services in line, including VIP and CIP lounges, a mother and child room, a medical station, ticket counters, post offices, domestic and international telephone communication, bars, restaurants, a currency exchange booth, and a Duty-Free shop.

On August 2022, Samarkand Airport became the first in Uzbekistan to introduce eGates. The system enables automated passport control, featuring document scanners and high-resolution cameras.

In 2024, Samarkand International Airport has introduced several improvements: a call button for passengers with disabilities to request assistance, free baggage scales in the terminal, and expanded services including cafés, pastry shops, and retail stores.

== Infrastructure ==
The airport has a single asphalt-concrete runway with dimensions of 3100x60 meters (runway 09/27). After a general reconstruction, the airport is certified under ICAO Category 1 and can accommodate all types of aircraft, including the Il-62, Il-86, Tu-154, Airbus A310, Airbus A320, Boeing 737, Boeing 757, and Boeing 767.

== Airlines and destinations ==
Airlines	Destinations
Aeroflot	Moscow–Sheremetyevo
Azerbaijan Airlines	Baku
azimuth	Krasnodar, Sochi, Ufa
Centrum Air	Bukhara, Dushanbe,, Dubai–International, Guangzhou, Istanbul, Khabarovsk, Moscow–Domodedovo, Moscow-Sheremetyevo, Namangan, Sochi, Tashkent, Tel Aviv, Urgench
FlyArystan	Almaty
flydubai	Dubai–International (resumes 29 December 2026)
FlyOne Armenia	Yerevan (begins June 2027)
Loong Air	Xi'an
Nordwind Airlines	Kazan
Pobeda	Moscow–Vnukovo
Qanot Sharq	Moscow–Domodedovo, Saint Petersburg, Tashkent, Tel Aviv
Rossiya Airlines	Saint Petersburg
S7 Airlines	Novosibirsk
SCAT Airlines	Türkistan
Silk Avia	Urgench, Tashkent
SunExpress	İzmir
Turkish Airlines	Istanbul
Ural Airlines	Krasnoyarsk–International, Moscow–Domodedovo, Moscow–Zhukovsky, Yekaterinburg
Utair	Moscow–Vnukovo, Saint Petersburg
Uzbekistan Airways	Istanbul, Moscow–Vnukovo, Saint Petersburg, Tashkent, Tel Aviv; Seasonal charter: Medina
Vietjet Qazaqstan	Astana, Türkistan

== Transportation ==
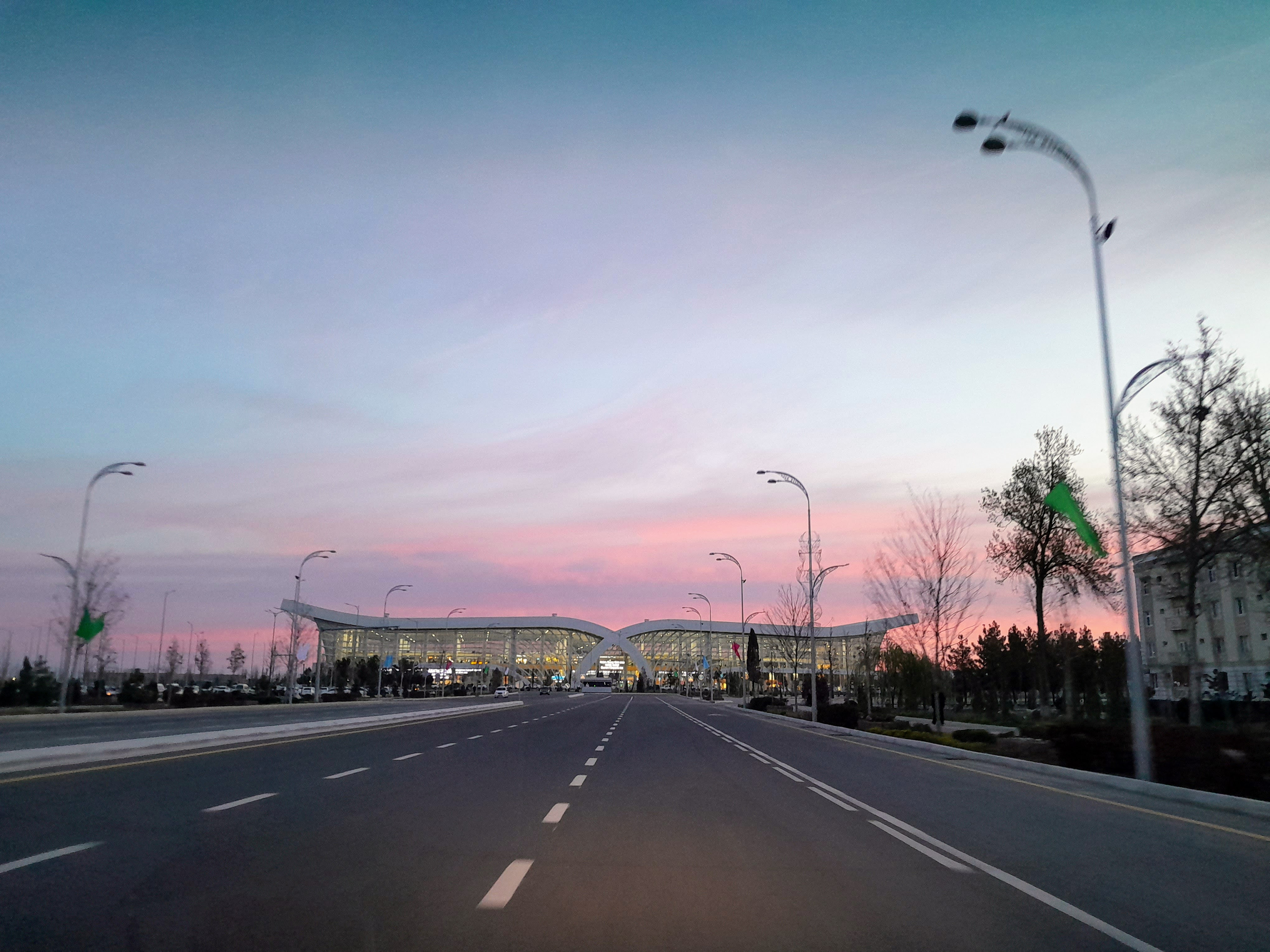
Road to Samarkand International Airport, 2023

Rental car services are provided by Hertz Rent A Car, Sixt and Europcar.

South of the terminal, there is a hotel. Additionally, there is a connection to the M37 highway, which runs north of the airport.

The forecourt area refers to the transport lines closest to the terminals, designated as part of the aviation security zone. Entry to this area is permitted only for public transport and taxis for passenger pickup. Access to the forecourt area exceeding the 15-minute limit is subject to a fee.

=== Public transport ===
Daily from 6:00 am to 9:00 pm, buses No. 52, 31, and M1 run from the central bus station and the Samarkand railway station to the airport. The travel time is approximately 15 minutes. The airport bus stop is located in front of the passenger terminal building, near the entrance and exit of the terminal.

=== Taxi ===
There are local Uzbek company Taxi OK and Russian Yandex Taxi offering services at Samarkand International Airport.

== Statistics ==
Annual passenger statistics of Samarkand International Airport (2022–2024)
Year	Passengers	References
2022	493,417	
2023	1,010,938	
2024	1,381,320	
2025	1,521,158	

== See also ==
- List of the busiest airports in the former USSR
- Transportation in Uzbekistan
