= Qanot Sharq =

Uzbek airline

- Qanot Sharq Airbus A320
IATA	ICAO	Call sign
HH	QNT	QANOT SHARQ
- Founded: 1998; 28 years ago
- Commenced operations: 2021 (relaunch)
- Hubs: Tashkent
- Focus cities: Samarkand
- Fleet size: 7
- Destinations: 30
- Headquarters: Tashkent, Uzbekistan
- Key people: Nosir Abdugafarov, owner Moisey Pak, CEO
- Website: qanotsharq.com

Qanot Sharq (Note: Uzbek pronunciation: [qaˈnɒt ʃarq]; lit. 'East Wing') is an airline based in Tashkent, Uzbekistan. The airline re-launched passenger operations in 2021 and operates international services from Tashkent and Samarkand.

== History ==
The airline was launched in 1998 with a single Ilyushin Il-76 cargo aircraft. It ceased operations in 2012 and returned its air operator's certificate.

In 2021, Qanot Sharq re-launched operations and leased two used Airbus A320-200 aircraft from Air Lease Corporation. The airline launched its first passenger flight on 14 October 2021, from Tashkent International Airport to Vnukovo International Airport in Moscow.

In February 2024, Qanot Sharq launched Airbus A330 flights from Tashkent to Medina.

In February 2025, Qanot Sharq stated that it expects five new Airbus A321neo-family aircraft in 2026 and 2027, including three A321XLR and two A321LR aircraft.

On 15 December 2025, the airline began twice-weekly flights from Tashkent to London Gatwick, its first UK route. Four days later, the airline took delivery of its first Airbus A321XLR via a long-term lease agreement with Air Lease; Airbus described the aircraft as the first of four A321XLR aircraft to be delivered to the airline.

Planned twice-weekly A330 flights to New York JFK, previously scheduled for 1 July 2026, were postponed to 2 September 2026. The airline announced that flights to Tel Aviv from Tashkent and Samarkand would resume on 24 June 2026 after a suspension.

== Destinations ==
Qanot Sharq publishes a list of destinations on its official website. Timetable filings and seasonal schedule changes are frequently reported by industry timetable sources.

Qanot Sharq destinations
Country	City	Airport	Notes	Refs
Bulgaria	Burgas	Burgas Airport	Seasonal	
China	Beijing	Beijing Daxing International Airport		
China	Guangzhou	Guangzhou Baiyun International Airport		
China	Hangzhou	Hangzhou Xiaoshan International Airport		
China	Sanya	Sanya Phoenix International Airport		
Czech Republic	Prague	Václav Havel Airport Prague	Seasonal	
Egypt	Sharm El Sheikh	Sharm El Sheikh International Airport		
Germany	Frankfurt	Frankfurt Airport		
Hungary	Budapest	Budapest Ferenc Liszt International Airport	Seasonal	
Indonesia	Denpasar	Ngurah Rai International Airport	Charter	
Israel	Tel Aviv	Ben Gurion Airport		
Italy	Milan	Milan Malpensa Airport		
Kazakhstan	Almaty	Almaty International Airport		
Kyrgyzstan	Bishkek	Manas International Airport	Begins 17 November 2026	
Russia	Moscow	Moscow Domodedovo Airport	Focus city	
Russia	Saint Petersburg	Pulkovo Airport		
Saudi Arabia	Jeddah	King Abdulaziz International Airport		
Saudi Arabia	Medina	Prince Mohammad bin Abdulaziz International Airport		
South Korea	Busan	Gimhae International Airport	Terminated	
South Korea	Seoul	Incheon International Airport		
Thailand	Pattaya	U-Tapao International Airport	Seasonal	
Thailand	Phuket	Phuket International Airport		
Turkey	Istanbul	Istanbul Airport		
Turkey	Trabzon	Trabzon Airport		
United Arab Emirates	Dubai	Dubai International Airport		
United Kingdom	London	Gatwick Airport		
United States	New York City	John F. Kennedy International Airport		
Uzbekistan	Bukhara	Bukhara International Airport		
Uzbekistan	Fergana	Fergana International Airport		
Uzbekistan	Namangan	Namangan Airport		
Uzbekistan	Qarshi	Qarshi Airport		
Uzbekistan	Samarqand	Samarqand International Airport	Focus city	
Uzbekistan	Tashkent	Islam Karimov Tashkent International Airport	Hub	
Uzbekistan	Termez	Termez Airport		
Vietnam	Da Nang	Da Nang International Airport		
Vietnam	Nha Trang	Cam Ranh International Airport		
Vietnam	Phu Quoc	Phu Quoc International Airport	Charter	

== Fleet ==
As of October 2026, Qanot Sharq operates a fleet of 7 aircraft.

Note: Aircraft seating configurations may vary by individual airframe and over time; figures below reflect configurations reported by Airbus and seat map sources.

Qanot Sharq fleet
Aircraft	In service	Orders	Passengers			Notes
Aircraft	In service	Orders	J	Y	Total	Notes
Airbus A320-200	2	—	—	174	174	
Airbus A321neo	2	—	12	190	202	
Airbus A321LR	—	2	TBA			Deliveries planned 2026-2027.
Airbus A321XLR	1	3	16	174	190	
Airbus A330-200	2	—	18	248	266	
Total	7	5				

== See also ==
- List of airlines of Uzbekistan
