= Lake Vodlozero =

Lake in the Republic of Karelia, Russia

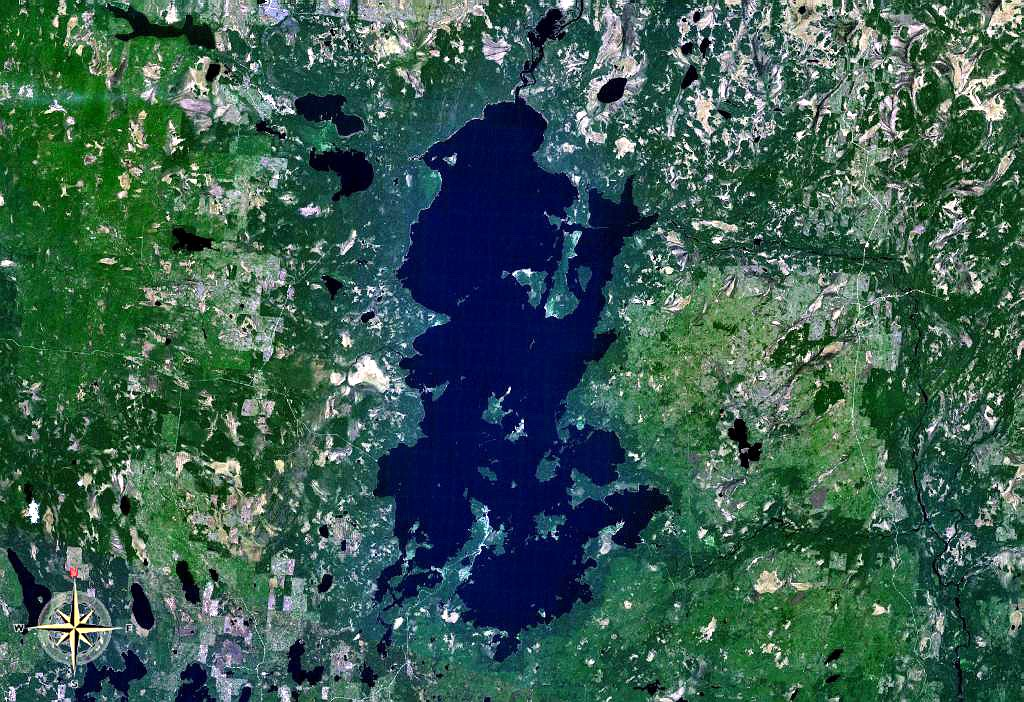
- seen from space

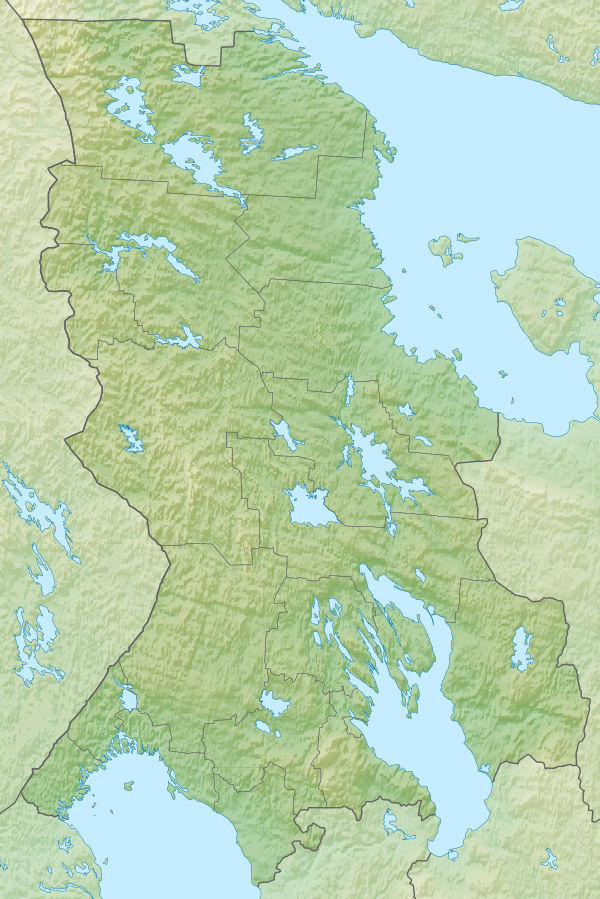
- Location within Russia Location within Karelia
- Location: Karelia
- Coordinates: 62°20′N 36°55′E
- Primary inflows: Ileksa
- Primary outflows: Vama, Sukhaya Vodla
- Basin countries: Russia
- Max. length: 36 km (22 mi)
- Max. width: 16 km (9.9 mi)
- Surface area: 322 km^{2} (124 sq mi)
- Islands: 190

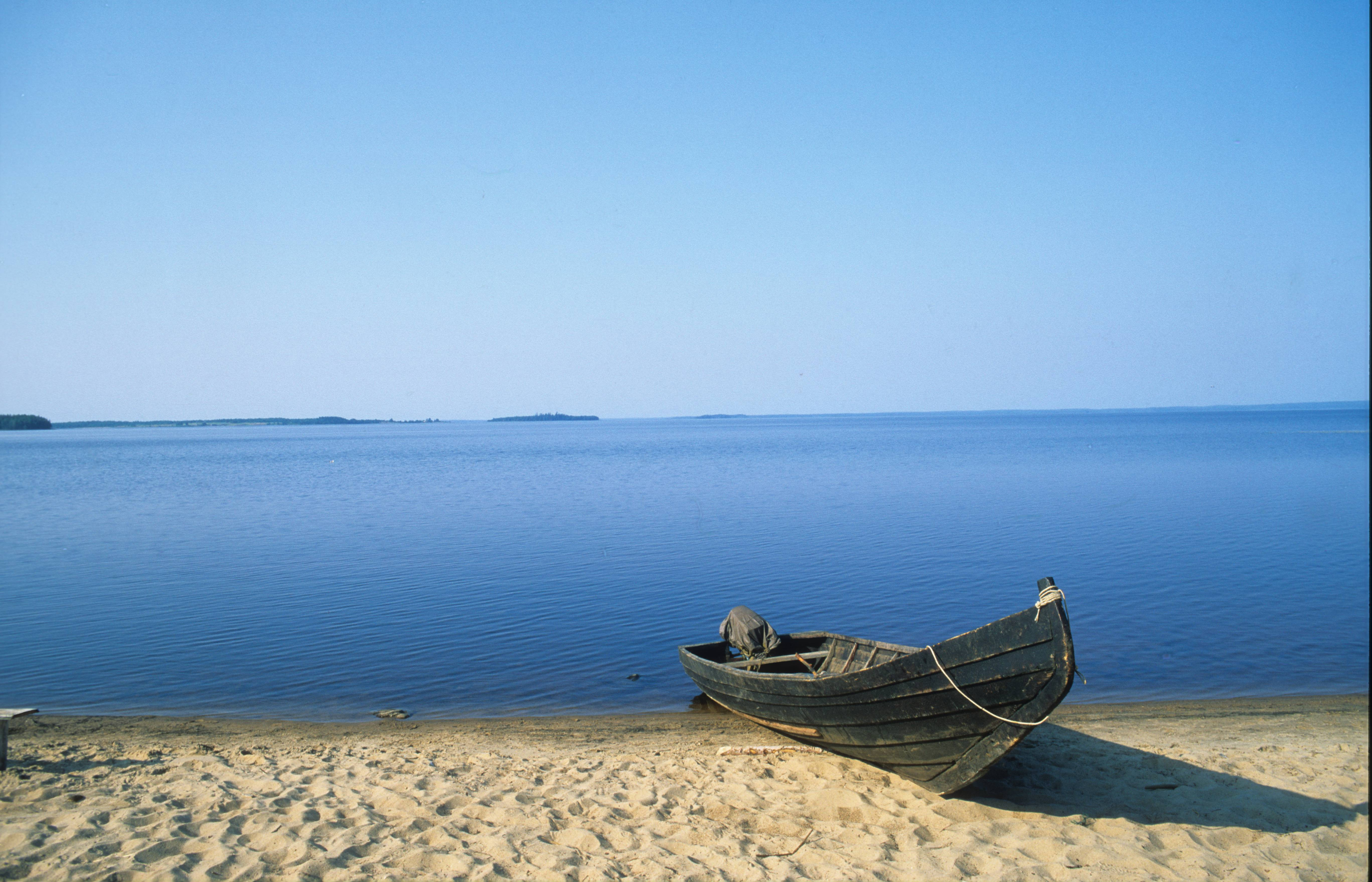
Lake Vodlozero

Lake Vodlozero (Russian: Водлозеро) is a large freshwater lake in the southeastern part of the Republic of Karelia, Russia. It is located at 62°20′N 36°55′E and has an area of 322 km^{2}. It is 36 km long and 16 km wide. There are more than 190 islands on the lake. Vodlozero is used for fishery. It freezes up in early November and stays icebound until early May. The largest tributary of the lake is the river Ileksa. Its outflow is the river Vodla (through its tributaries Suhaya Vodla and Vama), that flows into Lake Onega.

== See also ==
- Vodlozersky National Park
