= Krasnoborsky (rural locality) =

Name of several Russian rural localities

Krasnoborsky (Russian: Краснобо́рский; masculine), Krasnoborskaya (Краснобо́рская; feminine), or Krasnoborskoye (Краснобо́рское; neuter) is the name of several rural localities in Russia:

- Krasnoborsky, Republic of Karelia, a settlement in Pudozhsky District of the Republic of Karelia
- Krasnoborsky, Leningrad Oblast, a logging depot settlement in Radogoshchinskoye Settlement Municipal Formation of Boksitogorsky District of Leningrad Oblast
