= Avdeyevo, Vologodsky District, Vologda Oblast =

Avdeyevo Авдеево
- Village
- Location within Vologda Oblast Location within Russia
- Coordinates: 59°39′N 39°14′E
- Country: Russia
- Region: Vologda Oblast
- District: Vologodsky District
- Time zone: UTC+3:00

Avdeyevo (Russian: Авдеево) is a rural locality (a village) in Novlenskoye Rural Settlement of Vologodsky District, Vologda Oblast, Russia. The population was 2 as of 2010.

== Geography ==
Avdeyevo is located 66 km northwest of Vologda (the district's administrative centre) by road. Kelebardovo is the nearest rural locality.
