= Pudozhsky Uyezd =

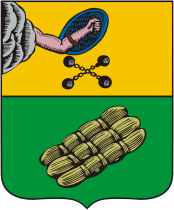
Pudozh Coat of arms

Pudozhsky Uyezd (Пудожский уезд) was one of the subdivisions of the Olonets Governorate of the Russian Empire. It was situated in the eastern part of the governorate. Its administrative centre was Pudozh. The territory of the uyezd is now part of the Pudozhsky District of the Republic of Karelia and of the Kargopolsky and Plesetsky districts of Arkhangelsk Oblast.

== Demographics ==
At the time of the Russian Empire Census of 1897, Pudozhsky Uyezd had a population of 33,472. Of these, 99.7% spoke Russian and 0.2% Finnish as their native language.
