= Avdeyevo, Ust-Kubinsky District, Vologda Oblast =

Avdeyevo Авдеево
- Village
- Location within Vologda Oblast Location within Russia
- Coordinates: 59°44′N 39°43′E
- Country: Russia
- Region: Vologda Oblast
- District: Ust-Kubinsky District
- Time zone: UTC+3:00

Avdeyevo (Russian: Авдеево) is a rural locality (a village) in Zadneselskoye Rural Settlement of Ust-Kubinsky District, Vologda Oblast, Russia. The population was 3 as of 2002.

== Geography ==
Avdeyevo is located 14 km north of Ustye (the district's administrative centre) by road. Kikht is the nearest rural locality.
