= Shosseynaya railway station =

- Cтанция Шоссейная
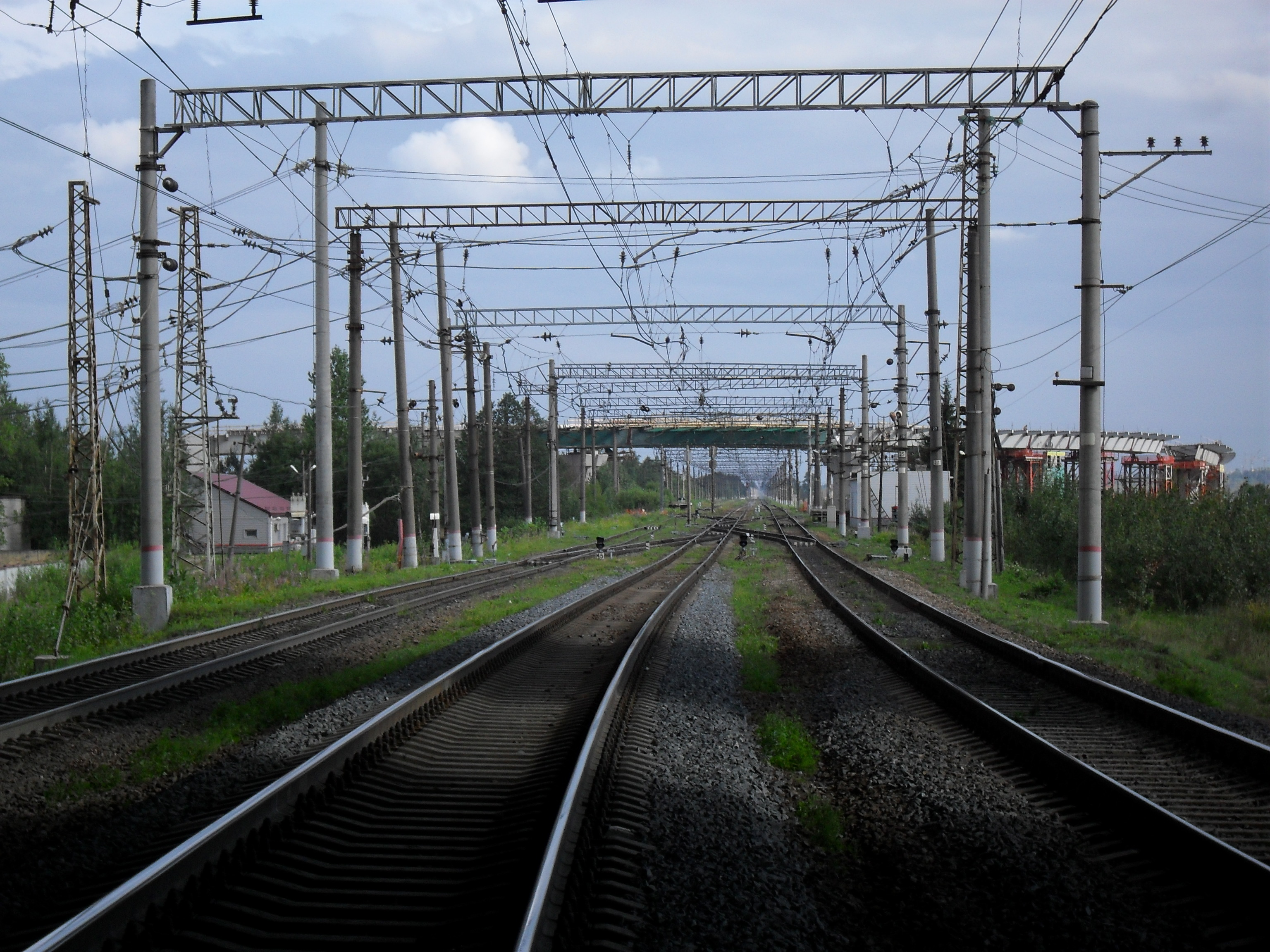
- Interactive map of the Shosseynaya railway station area

General information
- Type: Railway station
- Location: Saint Petersburg, Russia
- Coordinates: 59°48′29″N 30°19′57″E
- Completed: 1908
- Owner: Government of Russia

Shosseynaya railway station (Russian: Станция Шоссейная) is a railway station in October Railway in Saint Petersburg. It is located in the Moskovsky District of Saint Petersburg at the intersection of Pulkovo Highway and Ring Road.

The name given to Kiev (now this part is called Pulkovo) highway. It was originally located on the Warsaw branch north of the current location.

The base station acts as a cargo station. For the employees of the station on it stops the passing of the trains, embarkation and disembarkation are made from official vestibule of the head car.

In 1967, when the Warsaw railway line merged with the Baltic, dismantling the railway on Warsaw street. Platform "Airport" was opened on the connecting line, located on the other side of the Kiev highway. After that, the station was used only for cargo. Apparently, in the same period, the station moved to the south of the former location.

According to the station it was given the original name of the airport of Leningrad (now "Pulkovo") - highway.
