= Air Samarkand =

Uzbek airline

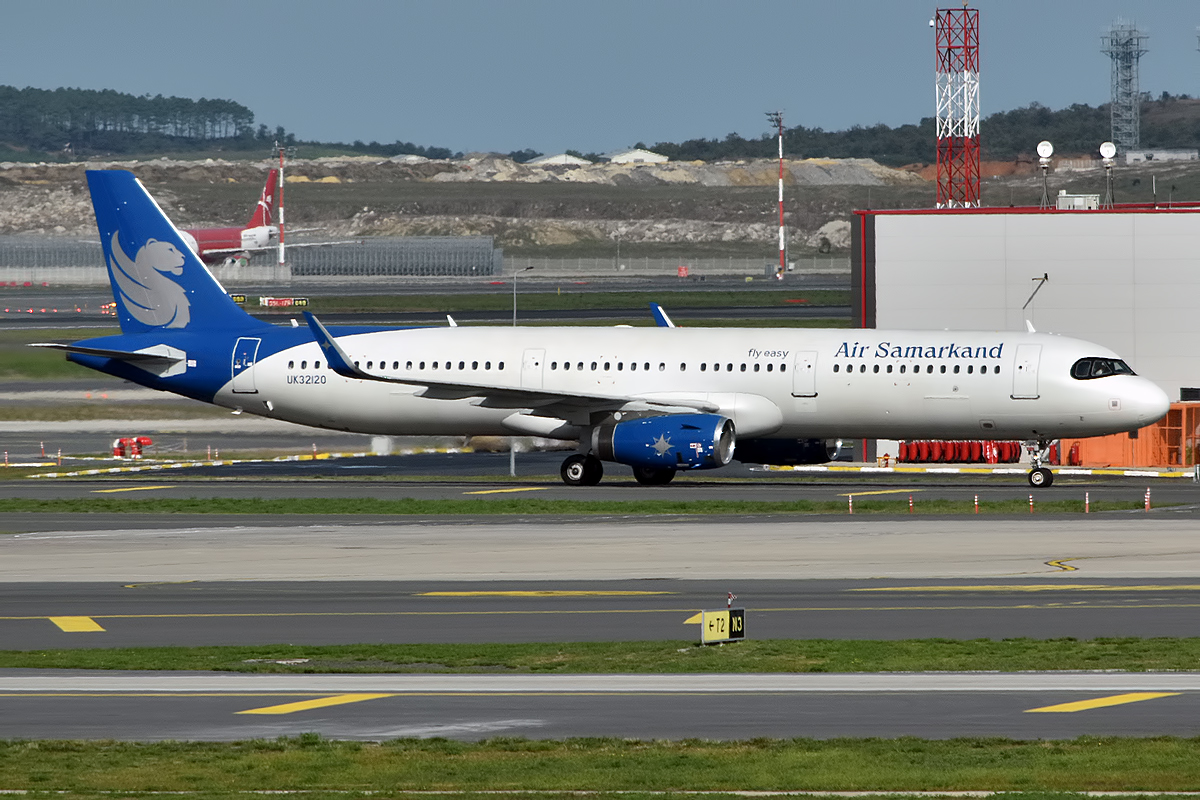
- Air Samarkand Airbus A321-200
IATA	ICAO	Call sign
9S	UZS	SAMARKAND
- Founded: 4 April 2022; 4 years ago
- Commenced operations: 29 December 2023; 2 years ago
- AOC #: 18-O
- Hubs: Samarkand International Airport
- Focus cities: Tashkent, Istanbul, Jeddah
- Fleet size: 6
- Destinations: 9
- Headquarters: Samarkand, Uzbekistan
- Key people: Zafar Butaev
- Website: Official website

Air Samarkand (legal name ООО Sam Air) is a startup airline based at Samarkand International Airport in Samarkand, Uzbekistan. The airline operates charter and passenger flights within Asia.

== History ==
The establishment of Air Samarkand began in 4 April 2022, the legal entity Air Samarkand or LLC Sam Air was registered. The airline was created with the goal of operating charter flights in Asia and connecting Samarkand to the region.

On November 2, 2023, the airline received its first aircraft, an Airbus A330-300 that previously flew for China Airlines.

On December 27, 2023, the airline was granted its Air Operator's Certificate (AOC). Air Samarkand was assigned its own ICAO code, UZS, and the radio call sign Samarkand.

Its first passenger charter flight was conducted on December 29, 2023, to Istanbul Sabiha Gökçen International Airport. Its first scheduled flight was conducted on March 21, 2024, to Istanbul Airport.

The airline’s charter program was launched on April 21, 2024, with the inaugural flight from Samarkand to Nha Trang, Vietnam.

Air Samarkand, carried 152,600 passengers and 2.65 tons of cargo during 2024. It operated 1,237 flights – 498 with its Airbus A321neo, 236 on the Airbus A321 and 503 with the Airbus A330-300 – whilst setting an average load factor of 82% on regular scheduled services and 89% on charter flights.

== Fleet ==
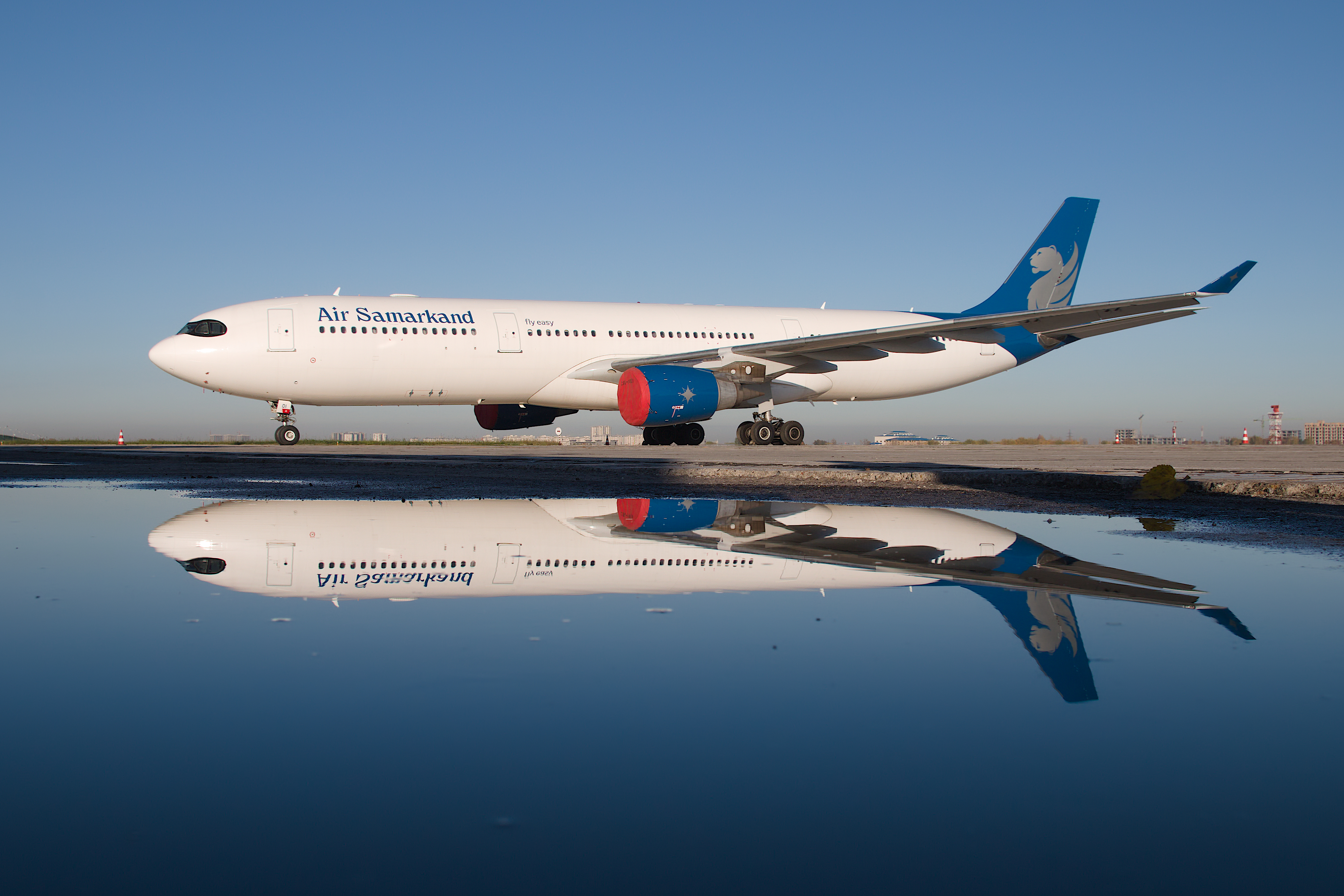
An Air Samarkand Airbus A330 at Samarqand International Airport

As of January 2026, Air Samarkand operates the following aircraft:

Air Samarkand Fleet
Aircraft	In service	Orders	Passengers			Notes
Aircraft	In service	Orders	C	Y	Total	Notes
Airbus A321-200	2	—	12	182	194	
Airbus A330-300	2	—	36	227	263	Previously operated by China Airlines.
Total	4	—				

Air Samarkand operates a fully Airbus fleet, which is planned to expand to eight aircraft.

The Airbus A321neo was phased out in December 2025.

== Destinations ==
Air Samarkand is planning significant expansion in its destinations alongside its fleet growth. The airline has announced its intention to operate flights to China, Indonesia, Malaysia, Turkey, and South Korea, as well as other potential destinations in Asia, Europe, and the Middle East.

As of December 2024, Air Samarkand operates flights to the following destinations:

Country	City	Airport	Notes	Refs
Egypt	Sharm El Sheikh	Sharm El Sheikh International Airport	Seasonal charter	
Georgia	Batumi	Batumi International Airport	Seasonal charter	
Georgia	Tbilisi	Tbilisi International Airport	Seasonal charter	
Israel	Tel Aviv	Ben Gurion Airport	Terminated	
Qatar	Doha	Hamad International Airport		
Saudi Arabia	Jeddah	King Abdulaziz International Airport		
Turkey	Istanbul	Istanbul Airport		
Turkey	Istanbul	Sabiha Gökçen International Airport	Terminated	
Turkey	İzmir	İzmir Adnan Menderes Airport	Seasonal	
Uzbekistan	Samarqand	Samarqand International Airport	Hub	
Uzbekistan	Tashkent	Tashkent International Airport	Focus city	
United Arab Emirates	Abu Dhabi	Zayed International Airport		
Vietnam	Phú Quốc	Phu Quoc International Airport	Seasonal charter	
