= Vodla =

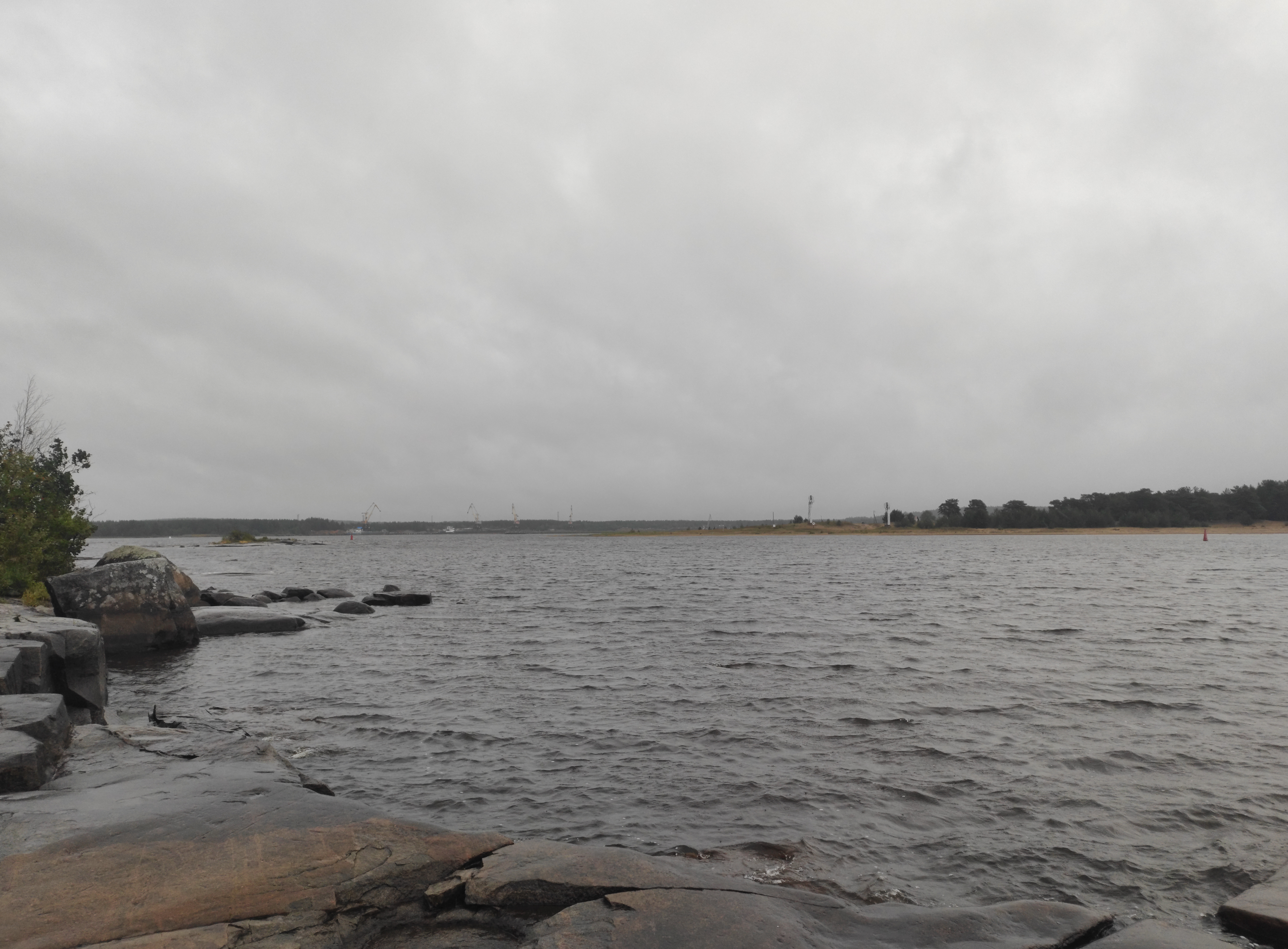

Location
- Country: Russia

Physical characteristics
- Source: Lake Vodlozero
- Mouth: Lake Onega
  - coordinates: 61.7973°N 35.9647°E
- Length: 149 km (93 mi)
- Basin size: 13,700 km^{2} (5,300 sq mi)
- Discharge
  - average: 130 m^{3}/s (4,600 cu ft/s)

Basin features
- Progression: Lake Onega→ Svir→ Lake Ladoga→ Neva→ Gulf of Finland

The Vodla (Russian: Водла, Finnish: Vodlajoki) is a river in the south-east of Republic of Karelia, Russia. The town of Pudozh is located along Vodla. The river is formed at the confluence of the rivers Sukhaya Vodla and Vama, two outflows of the Lake Vodlozero, a large freshwater lake in the southeastern part of Karelia. It is 149 kilometres (93 mi) long, and has a drainage basin of 13,700 square kilometres (5,300 sq mi). After rising in Lake Vodlozero, the river flows south before turning west into Lake Onega, Europe's second largest lake. From there, the 224-kilometer river Svir connects Lake Onega with Lake Ladoga. The Vodla's water is soft and humic.
