= Pudozh =

Town in the Republic of Karelia, Russia

Pudozh Пудож
- Town
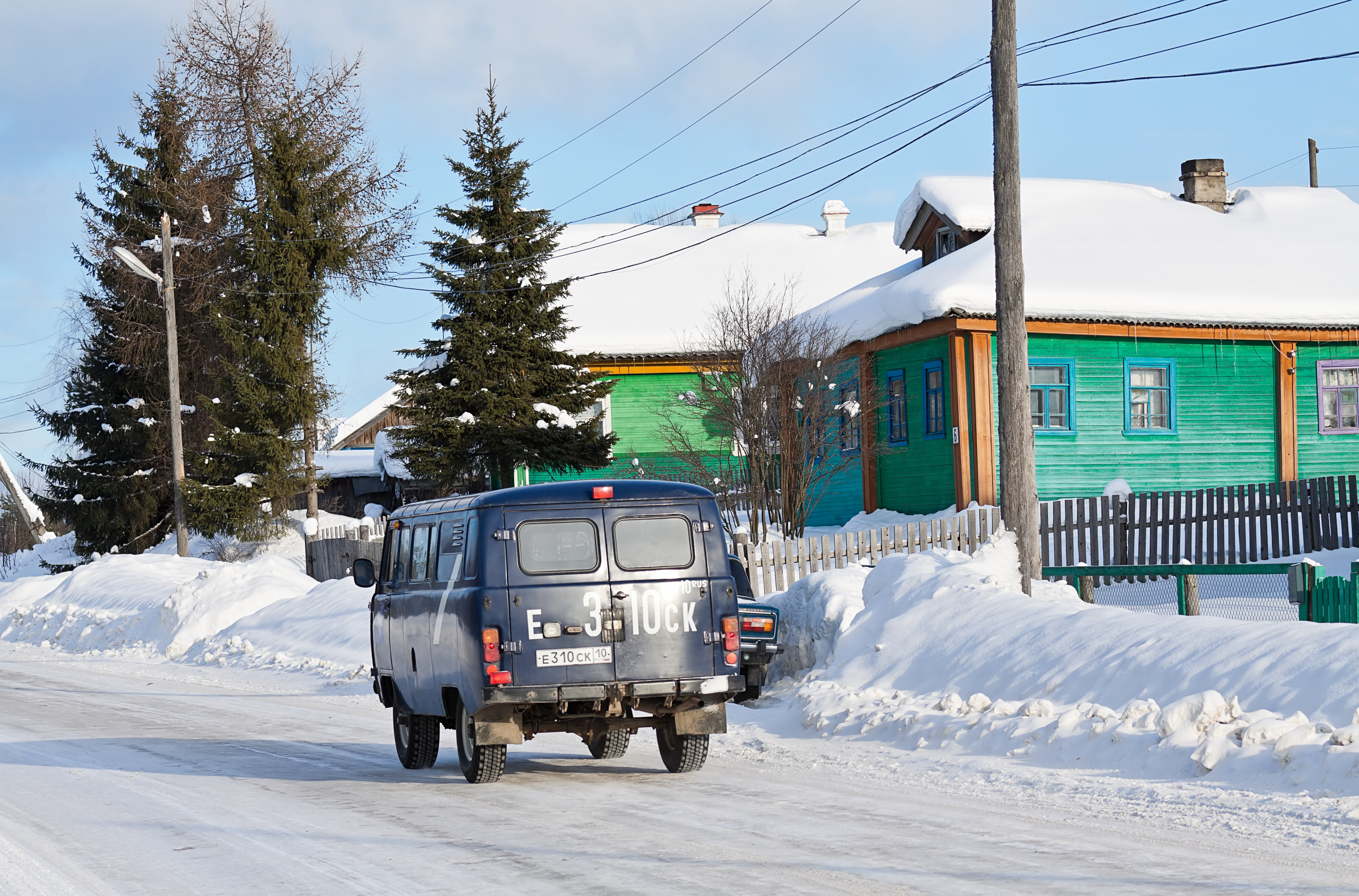
- A street in Pudozh

- Flag Coat of arms
- Interactive map of Pudozh
- Location of Pudozh Pudozh (Karelia)
- Coordinates: 61°48′N 36°31′E
- Country: Russia
- Federal subject: Republic of Karelia
- Administrative district: Pudozhsky District
- First mentioned: 1382
- Town status since: 1785
- Elevation: 55 m (180 ft)

Population (2010 Census)
  - Total: 9,698
  - Estimate (2023): 7,207 (−25.7%)

Administrative status
  - Capital of: Pudozhsky District

Municipal status
  - Municipal district: Pudozhsky Municipal District
  - Urban settlement: Pudozhskoye Urban Settlement
  - Capital of: Pudozhsky Municipal District, Pudozhskoye Urban Settlement
- Time zone: UTC+3 (UTC+03:00)
- Postal code: 186150
- OKTMO ID: 86642101001
- Website: pudozhgoradm.ru

Pudozh (Russian: Пудож) is a town and the administrative center of Pudozhsky District of the Republic of Karelia, Russia, located on the Vodla River 115 kilometers (71 mi) east of Petrozavodsk, but 352 kilometers (219 mi) traveling by the road around Lake Onega. Population: 9,698 (2010 census); 10,632 (2002 census); 10,982 (1989 Soviet census); 8,000 (1970).

An international tourist route Blue Highway ends in Pudozh. The route leads from Norway via Sweden and Finland to Republic of Karelia.

== Etymology ==
According to Yevgeny Pospelov, the name of Pudozh is derived from the Karelian word puvas (genitive pudahan) meaning 'anabranch, distributary', referring to its location by an anabranch of the river Vodla. In the Karelian language, the town is known as Puudoži, while in Finnish it is called Puudosi or Puutoinen.

== History ==
It was first mentioned in a birch bark manuscript from the late 14th century as Pudoga. The settlement was later called Pudozhsky Pogost. It was granted town status in 1785, also becoming the center of the Pudozhsky uezd. Pudozh was demoted to a selo in 1926, but its town status was restored in 1943.

A commemorative monument was erected in 1989 for those executed in the 1930s and 1940s -- local residents, Belbaltlag prisoners and people of Finnish nationality.

== Administrative and municipal status ==
Within the framework of administrative divisions, Pudozh serves as the administrative center of Pudozhsky District, to which it is directly subordinated. As a municipal division, the town of Pudozh, together with eleven rural localities, is incorporated within Pudozhsky Municipal District as Pudozhskoye Urban Settlement.
