= Pudozhsky District =

Pudozhsky District Пудожский район (Russian)
- District
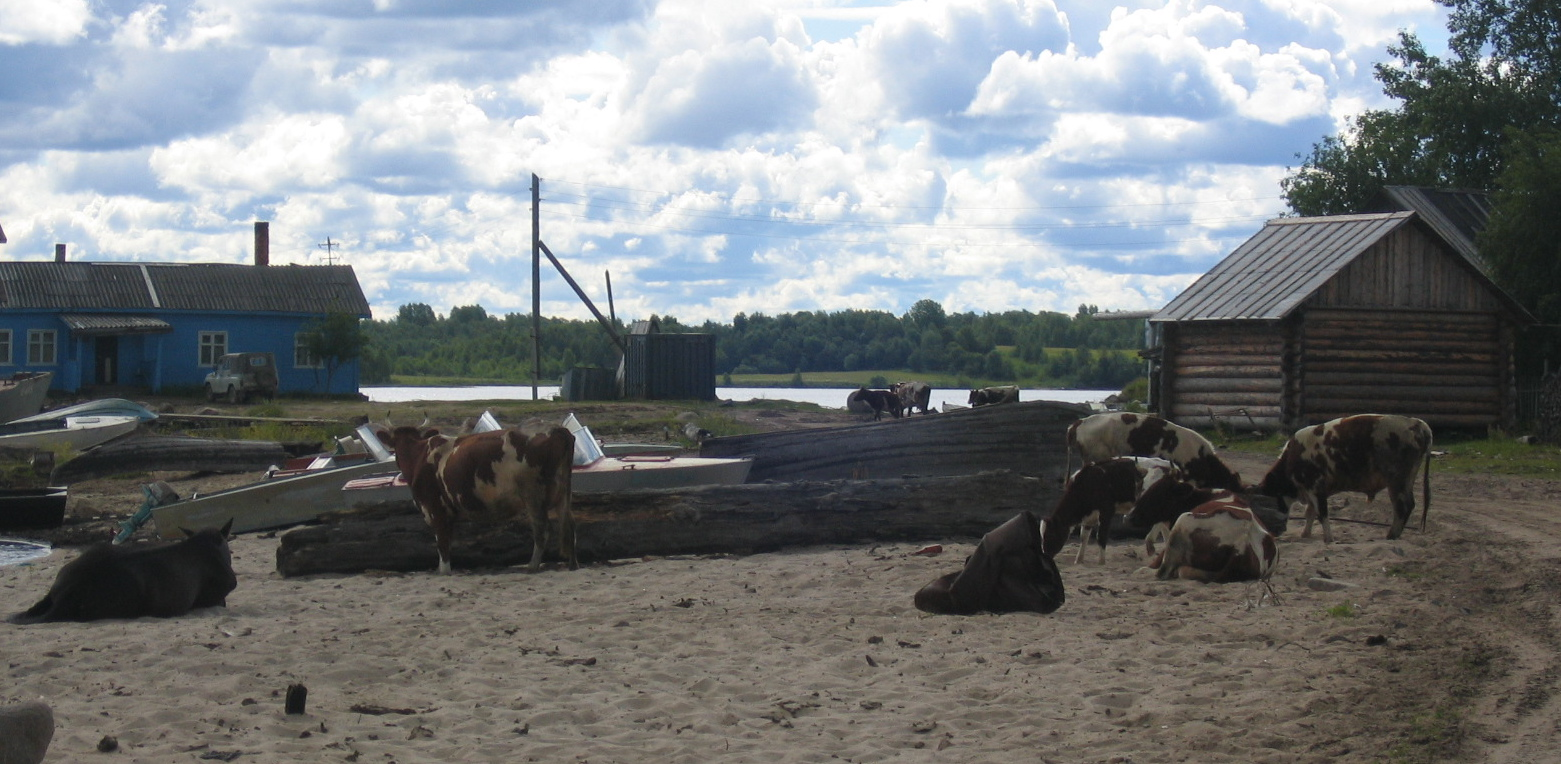
- A rural area in Pudozhsky District

- Flag Coat of arms
- Location of Pudozhsky District in the Republic of Karelia
- Coordinates: 61°48′N 36°32′E
- Country: Russia
- Federal subject: Republic of Karelia
- Established: 23 September 1927
- Administrative center: Pudozh

Area
  - Total: 12,700 km^{2} (4,900 sq mi)

Population (2010 Census)
  - Total: 21,659
  - Density: 1.71/km^{2} (4.42/sq mi)
  - Urban: 44.8%
  - Rural: 55.2%

Administrative structure
  - Inhabited localities: 1 cities/towns, 72 rural localities

Municipal structure
  - Municipally incorporated as: Pudozhsky Municipal District
  - Municipal divisions: 1 urban settlements, 7 rural settlements
- Time zone: UTC+3 (UTC+03:00)
- OKTMO ID: 86642000
- Website: http://pudogadm.ru

Population of Pudozhsky District
- 2010 Census: 21,659
- 2002 Census: 27,538
- 1989 Census: 31,723
- 1979 Census: 31,738

Pudozhsky District (Russian: Пу́дожский райо́н) is an administrative district (raion), one of the fifteen in the Republic of Karelia, Russia. It is located in the southeast of the republic. The area of the district is 12,700 square kilometers (4,900 sq mi). Its administrative center is the town of Pudozh. As of the 2010 Census, the total population of the district was 21,659, with the population of Pudozh accounting for 44.8% of that number.

== Administrative and municipal status ==
Within the framework of administrative divisions, Pudozhsky District is one of the fifteen in the Republic of Karelia and has administrative jurisdiction over one town (Pudozh) and seventy-two rural localities. As a municipal division, the district is incorporated as Pudozhsky Municipal District. The town of Pudozh and eleven rural localities are incorporated into an urban settlement, while the remaining sixty-one rural localities are incorporated into seven rural settlements within the municipal district. The town of Pudozh serves as the administrative center of both the administrative and municipal district.

== Notable people ==
- Alexei Fofanov (1915-1986) - Hero of the Soviet Union, born in the village of Klimovskaya.
