= Shirak Avia =

Airline of Armenia

Shirak Avia Շիրակ Ավիա

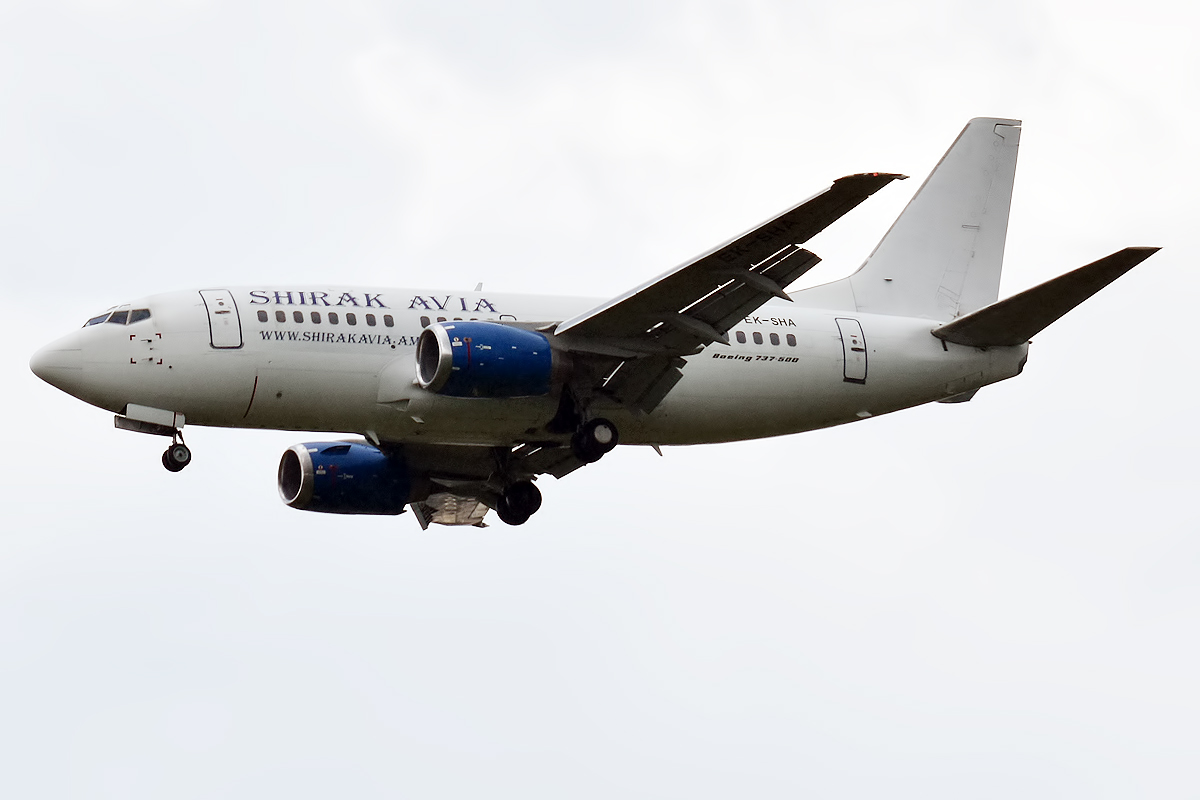
- Boeing 737-500
IATA	ICAO	Call sign
5G	SHS	SHIRAK
- Founded: 2019; 7 years ago
- AOC #: 072
- Operating bases: Zvartnots International Airport
- Focus cities: Yerevan
- Fleet size: 3
- Destinations: 12
- Headquarters: Yerevan, Armenia
- Key people: Levon Karamyan (CEO)
- Website: shirakavia.am

Shirak Avia LLC (Armenian: «Շիրակ Ավիա» ՍՊԸ) is an Armenian carrier based at Zvartnots International Airport in Yerevan, Armenia.

== History ==
Originally founded in 2019, the company purchased a Boeing 737-500 aircraft, which is leased to Armenia Airways since December 2020. In March 2022, Shirak Avia leased a Boeing 737-800. On June 20, 2022, the airline made its first flight to Moscow's Vnukovo International Airport.

Since 2020, all Armenian carriers including Shirak Avia have been banned from entering European Union airspace.

== Destinations ==
As of June 2023, Shirak Avia is serving the following destinations:

Country	City	Airport	Notes	Refs
Armenia	Yerevan	Zvartnots International Airport	Hub	
Georgia	Tbilisi	Shota Rustaveli Tbilisi International Airport	Terminated	
Georgia	Kutaisi	David the Builder Kutaisi International Airport	Terminated	
Kazakhstan	Astana	Nursultan Nazarbayev International Airport		
Maldives	Malé	Velana International Airport	Terminated	
Russia	Astrakhan	Narimanovo Airport	Terminated	
Russia	Kaliningrad	Khrabrovo Airport	Seasonal	
Russia	Krasnoyarsk	Krasnoyarsk International Airport		
Russia	Moscow	Sheremetyevo International Airport		
Russia	Moscow	Vnukovo International Airport		
Russia	Nizhnekamsk	Begishevo Airport	Terminated	
Russia	Nizhny Novgorod	Strigino International Airport		
Russia	Novosibirsk	Tolmachevo Airport		
Russia	Omsk	Omsk Tsentralny Airport	Terminated	
Russia	Orenburg	Orenburg Tsentralny Airport	Terminated	
Russia	Perm	Bolshoye Savino Airport		
Russia	Saratov	Saratov Gagarin Airport		
Russia	Sochi	Adler-Sochi International Airport	Terminated	
Russia	Tyumen	Roshchino Airport	Terminated	
Russia	Ufa	Mustai Karim Ufa International Airport		
Russia	Yaroslavl	Tunoshna Airport	Terminated	
Russia	Yekaterinburg	Koltsovo International Airport	Terminated	
Uzbekistan	Tashkent	Tashkent International Airport		

== Fleet ==
As of August 2025, Shirak Avia operates the following aircraft:

Armenia Airways fleet
Aircraft	In Service	Passenger			Notes
Aircraft	In Service	C	Y	Total	Notes
Boeing 737-500	2	—	131	131	
Boeing 737-800	1	—	189	189	

== See also ==
- List of airlines of Armenia
- List of airports in Armenia
- List of the busiest airports in Armenia
- Transport in Armenia
