= Sky Net Airline =

Armenian charter airline

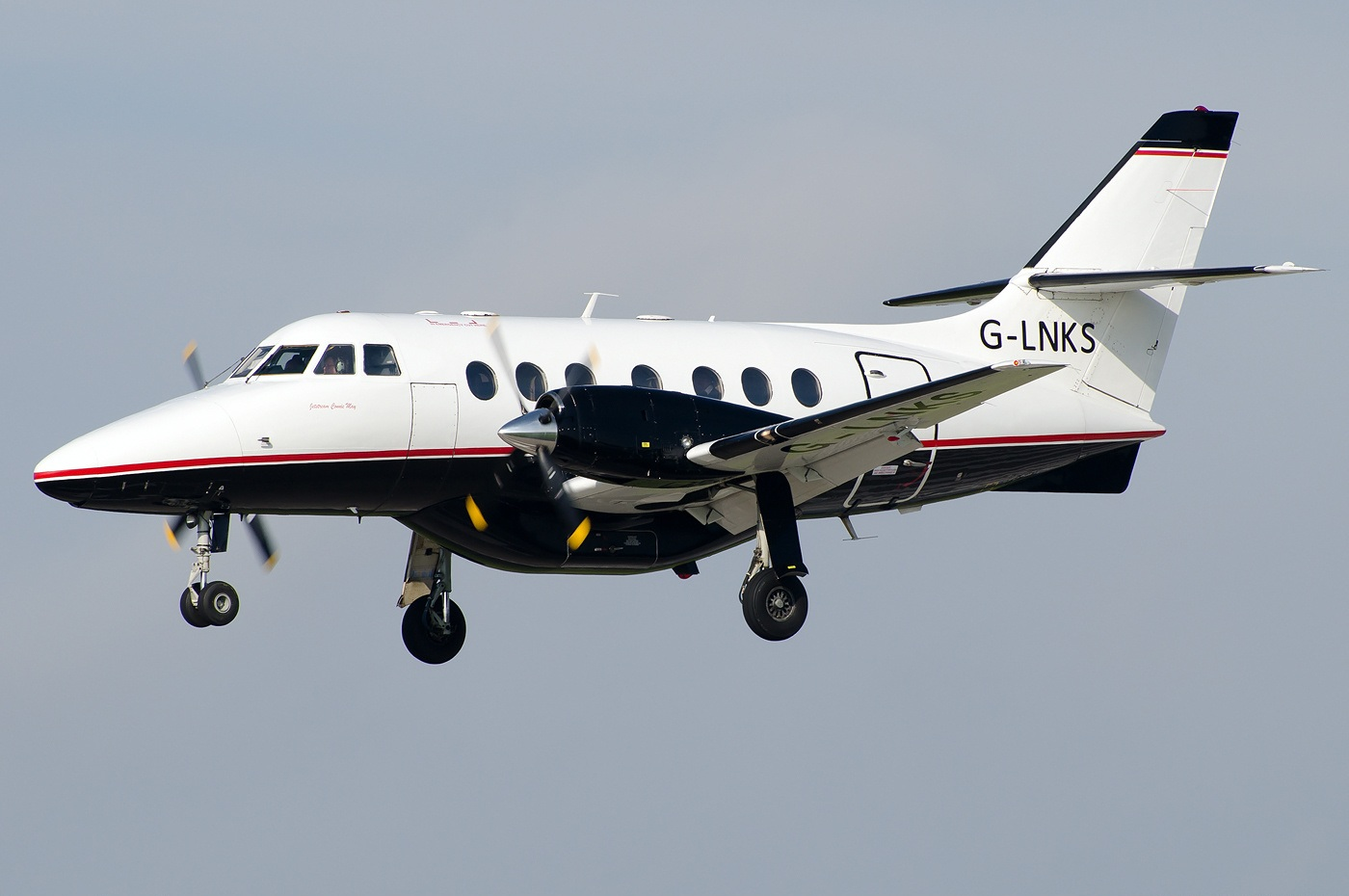
- BAe Jetstream 31
IATA	ICAO	Call sign
-	SKJ	SKYNET AIR
- Founded: 2011
- Commenced operations: 2013
- Operating bases: Zvartnots International Airport
- Fleet size: 1
- Headquarters: Yerevan

Sky Net Airline is a charter airline from Armenia. It was founded in 2011 and commenced operations in 2013. The airline has its main hub at the Zvartnots International Airport and its fleet comprises just one BAe Jetstream 31 aircraft.

It is currently banned from flying into the European Union.

== Fleet ==
Sky Net Airline fleet
Aircraft	In fleet	Orders	Passengers	Notes
BAe Jetstream 31	1		-	
Total	1			

== See also ==
- List of airlines of Armenia
- List of the busiest airports in Armenia
- Transport in Armenia
