= FlyOne Armenia =

Armenian low-cost airline

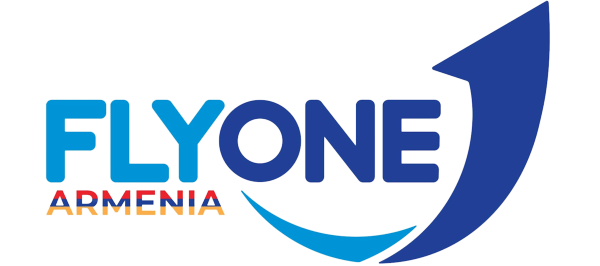

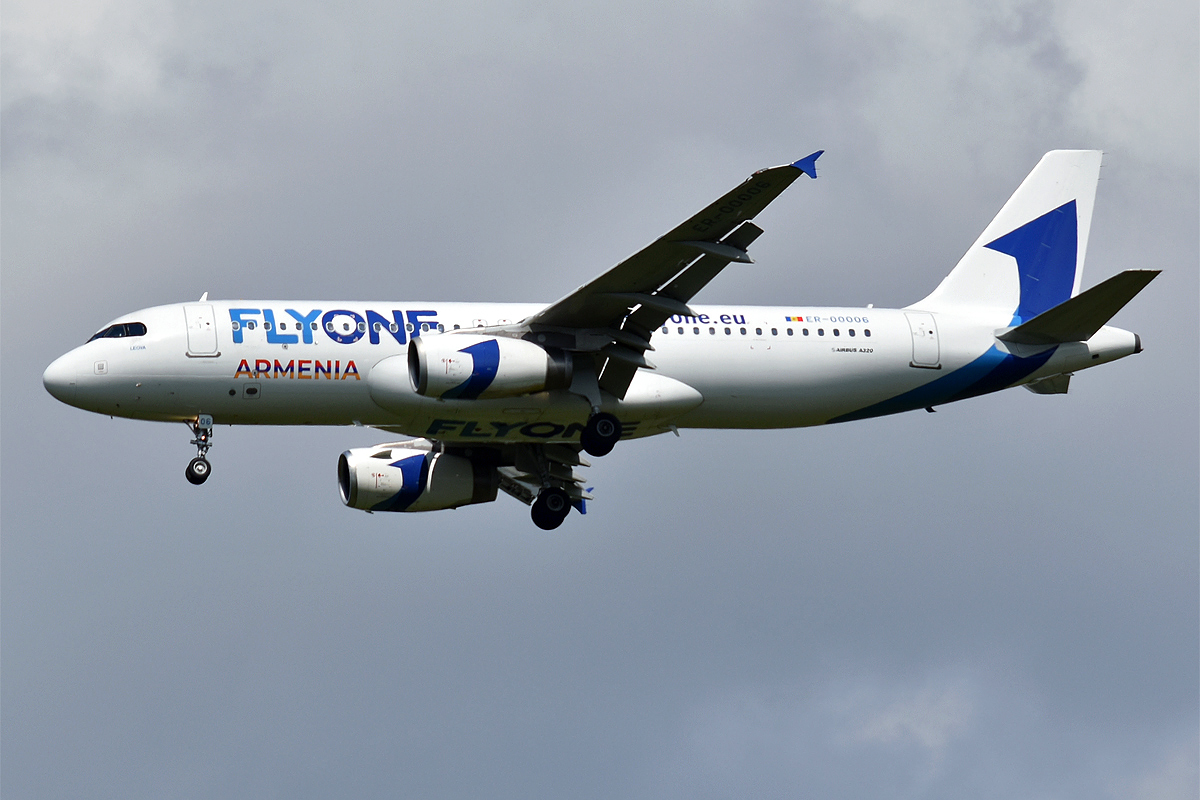
- Airbus A320
IATA	ICAO	Call sign
3F	FIE	ARMRIDER
- Founded: 2021
- AOC #: 074
- Operating bases: Zvartnots International Airport
- Hubs: Zvartnots International Airport
- Fleet size: 7
- Destinations: 28
- Parent company: FlyOne
- Headquarters: Yerevan, Armenia
- Key people: Aram Ananyan (Chairman), Aram Khachatryan (Director)
- Employees: 150
- Website: flyone.eu/am/

FlyOne Armenia LLC, styled as FlyOne Armenia or FLY ONE Armenia, is an Armenian low-cost airline based in Yerevan, Armenia. It is a subsidiary of the Moldovan low-cost airline FlyOne.

Despite being banned from flying in the EU, it serves however destinations within the EU using wet-leased aircraft from other operators, including its parent company.

== History ==
The airline was created following a 60 million €uro ($67.8 million) investment by Moldovan airline FlyOne. The airline was granted the Air Operator's Certificate on 29 October 2021 and began operations on the following 18 December with a direct flight to Lyon.

In late 2021 Vladimir Cebotari, Chairman of FlyOne, said that the airline was negotiating the lease of three A321-200s in total, including the units assigned to the Armenian carrier.

== Destinations ==
Country	City	Airport	Notes	Refs
Armenia	Gyumri	Gyumri Shirak International Airport		
Armenia	Yerevan	Zvartnots International Airport	Hub	
Austria	Vienna	Vienna International Airport		
Belgium	Brussels	Brussels Airport		
Bulgaria	Burgas	Burgas Airport	Seasonal	
Egypt	Sharm El Sheikh	Sharm El Sheikh International Airport	Seasonal	
Egypt	Hurghada	Hurghada International Airport	Seasonal	
Egypt	Marsa Alam	Marsa Alam International Airport	Seasonal	
France	Lyon	Lyon–Saint-Exupéry Airport		
France	Nice	Nice Côte d'Azur Airport		
France	Paris	Charles de Gaulle Airport		
Georgia	Tbilisi	Shota Rustaveli Tbilisi International Airport		
Germany	Cologne	Cologne Bonn Airport		
Germany	Düsseldorf	Düsseldorf Airport		
Greece	Heraklion	Heraklion International Airport		
Greece	Thessaloniki	Thessaloniki Airport "Makedonia"		
Cyprus	Larnaca	Larnaca International Airport		
Cyprus	Paphos	Paphos International Airport		
Iran	Tehran	Tehran Imam Khomeini International Airport	Terminated	
Italy	Milan	Milan Malpensa Airport		
Italy	Milan	Milan Bergamo Airport		
Italy	Rome	Leonardo da Vinci Rome Fiumicino Airport		
Israel	Tel Aviv	Ben Gurion Airport		
Kazakhstan	Almaty	Almaty International Airport	Begins 12 June 2026	
Lebanon	Beirut	Beirut–Rafic Hariri International Airport		
Moldova	Chișinău	Chișinău International Airport		
Montenegro	Tivat	Tivat Airport	Seasonal	
Qatar	Doha	Hamad International Airport	Seasonal charter	
Romania	Iași	Iași International Airport		
Russia	Kazan	Ğabdulla Tuqay Kazan International Airport		
Russia	Krasnodar	Krasnodar International Airport		
Russia	Mineralnye Vody	Mineralnye Vody Airport		
Russia	Moscow	Moscow Domodedovo Airport		
Russia	Moscow	Sheremetyevo International Airport		
Russia	Moscow	Vnukovo International Airport		
Russia	Novosibirsk	Tolmachevo Airport	Terminated	
Russia	Saint Petersburg	Pulkovo Airport		
Russia	Samara	Kurumoch International Airport		
Russia	Sochi	Sochi International Airport		
Russia	Yekaterinburg	Koltsovo International Airport		
Spain	Alicante	Alicante–Elche Miguel Hernández Airport	Begins 4 June 2026	
Spain	Barcelona	Josep Tarradellas Barcelona–El Prat Airport	Seasonal	
Tajikistan	Dushanbe	Dushanbe International Airport	Begins 22 August 2026	
Turkey	Antalya	Antalya Airport	Seasonal	
Turkey	Istanbul	Istanbul Airport		
Ukraine	Kyiv	Boryspil International Airport	Terminated	
United Arab Emirates	Dubai	Al Maktoum International Airport		
United Arab Emirates	Dubai	Dubai International Airport		

== Fleet ==
=== Current fleet ===
As of May 2026, the fleet includes the following aircraft:

Aircraft	In service	Orders	Passengers	Notes
Airbus A319CJ	1	—	VIP	For government and VIP use only.
Airbus A320-200	5	—	180	
Airbus A321-200	1	—	220	
Airbus A321neo	—	2	239	
Total	7	2		

Fly One Armenia started using the Gulfstream G450 Business Class Aircraft for special business flights.

== See also ==
- List of airlines of Armenia
- List of airports in Armenia
- List of the busiest airports in Armenia
- Transport in Armenia
