= Hayways (airline) =

Hayways Հայուեյզ
IATA	ICAO	Call sign
Y5	HYY	HAYWAYS
- Founded: 1 October 2019
- AOC #: 078
- Hubs: Zvartnots International Airport
- Fleet size: 1
- Destinations: 2
- Headquarters: Yerevan, Armenia
- Website: hayways.aero

Hayways (Armenian: Հայուեյզ), formerly known as Fly Armenia Airways, is an Armenian airline headquartered in Yerevan and based at Zvartnots International Airport.

== History ==
The airline was founded as Fly Armenia Airways, and received an Air Operator's Certificate in July 2020. It announced it would operate passenger flights to nine destinations in Europe and the Middle East, including Prague, Damascus and Tel Aviv as well as an unspecified network of long-haul freight operations. However neither these scheduled flights nor the announced aircraft fleet materialized.

Hayways had subsequently begun performing cargo-only flights to Moscow in 2024.

== Destinations ==
Hayways destinations
Country	City	Airport	Notes	Refs
Armenia	Yerevan	Zvartnots International Airport	Hub	
Russia	Moscow	Vnukovo International Airport		

== Fleet ==
As of August 2025, Hayways operates the following aircraft:

Hayways fleet
Aircraft	In service	Orders	Passengers			Notes
Aircraft	In service	Orders	J	Y	Total	Notes
Boeing 737-400SF	1	—	—	—	—	Cargo

== See also ==
- Transport in Armenia
- List of airports in Armenia
- List of the busiest airports in Armenia
