= Civil Aviation Committee (Armenia) =

Civil Aviation Committee of the Ministry of Territorial Administration and Infrastructure օf Armenia
- Քաղաքացիական ավիացիայի կոմիտե
- Coat of arms of Armenia

Agency overview
- Formed: 13 February 2003
- Jurisdiction: Armenia
- Agency executive: Mihran Khachatryan, Chairman of the Committee
- Website: aviation.am

The Civil Aviation Committee (Armenian: Քաղաքացիական ավիացիայի կոմիտե) is an agency of the Ministry of Territorial Administration and Infrastructure օf Armenia. Its head office is on the property of Zvartnots International Airport in Zvartnots, near Yerevan.

== History ==
Although the Department of Civil Aviation was commissioned in 2003, Armenia's aviation history dates back to 1933 when Armenian independent air detachments under the Soviet Union, started regular flights to Tbilisi from the Southern Airfield (former name of Erebuni Airport).

During the Soviet Union, all flights were operated by the state owned company called Aeroflot. Aeroflot connected all major cities of the nation to one another. Armenia had several direct flights to other republics of the Soviet Union. However, international flights out of the USSR were flown only through Moscow Sheremetyevo airport.

During the Soviet Union, Armenia saw the creation and the expansion of its aviation industry. The Armenian SSR built seven airports and many other functioning airstrips throughout the country.

Currently, there are five official operational airports in Armenia. Two of the five (Shirak Airport and Zvartnots Airport) service international flights, while the rest serve as regional airports. Meanwhile, Erebuni Airport and Arzni Airport are mostly designated as a military airport, stationing the Armenian Air Force.

On 2 June 2020, Armenia was added to the list of countries the airlines of which are banned from entering the airspace of EU member states after assessing Armenia's "safety oversight capabilities."

On 15 November 2021, the Government of Armenia and the European Union signed the Armenia-EU Common Aviation Area Agreement. As part of the agreement, all EU airlines will be able to operate direct flights from anywhere in the EU to any airport in Armenia, and the same will apply to Armenian airlines. In addition, Armenia will continue to bring its legislation in line with EU aviation standards, including on aviation security, air traffic control, economic regulation, competition, and consumer protection. Armenia also cooperates with the European Union Aviation Safety Agency (EASA) and participates in the EASA's Pan-European Partners (PANEP) initiative.

== See also ==
- Civil aviation authority
- List of airlines of Armenia
- List of airports in Armenia
- List of the busiest airports in Armenia
- Transport in Armenia
