= List of airlines of Armenia =

This is a list of airlines which have an Air Operator Certificate issued by the General Department of Civil Aviation of Armenia.

As of 2024, all airlines certified by the General Department of Civil Aviation of Armenia are banned from EU airspace, on the list of carriers banned from operating into the European Union.

== Scheduled airlines ==
| Airline | Armenian name | IATA | ICAO | Image | Callsign | Started operations | Hub airport(s) | Notes |
|---|---|---|---|---|---|---|---|---|
| Armenia Airways | Արմենիա Էյրվեյզ | 6A | AMW | | ARMENIA | 2018 | Zvartnots International Airport | |
| Armenian Airlines | Հայկական ավիաուղիներ | JI | AAG | | APRICOT | 2023 | Zvartnots International Airport | presently not operational |
| FlyOne Armenia | - | 3F | FIE | | ARMRIDER | 2021 | Zvartnots International Airport | |
| NovAir | Նովէյր ՍՊԸ | NG | NIA | | NOVAIR | 2020 | Zvartnots International Airport | |
| Shirak Avia | Շիրակ Ավիա | 5G | SHS | | SHIRAK | 2021 | Zvartnots International Airport | |

== Charter airlines ==
| Airline | IATA | ICAO | Image | Callsign | Started operations | Hub airport(s) | Notes |
|---|---|---|---|---|---|---|---|
| Sky Net Airline | | SKJ | | SKYNET AIR | 2013 | Zvartnots International Airport | reported not operational |

== Cargo airlines ==
| Airline | IATA | ICAO | Image | Callsign | Started operations | Hub airport(s) | Notes |

== See also ==
- List of airlines
- List of airlines of Europe
- List of airports in Armenia
- List of the busiest airports in Armenia
- List of defunct airlines of Armenia
- List of defunct airlines of Europe
- Transport in Armenia
