= Armenia Airways =

Airline of Armenia

Armenia Airways Արմենիա Էյրվեյզ
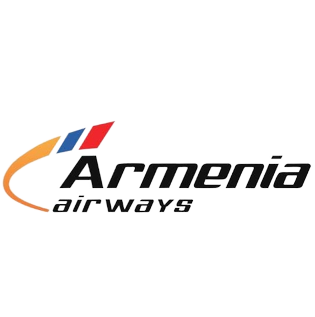

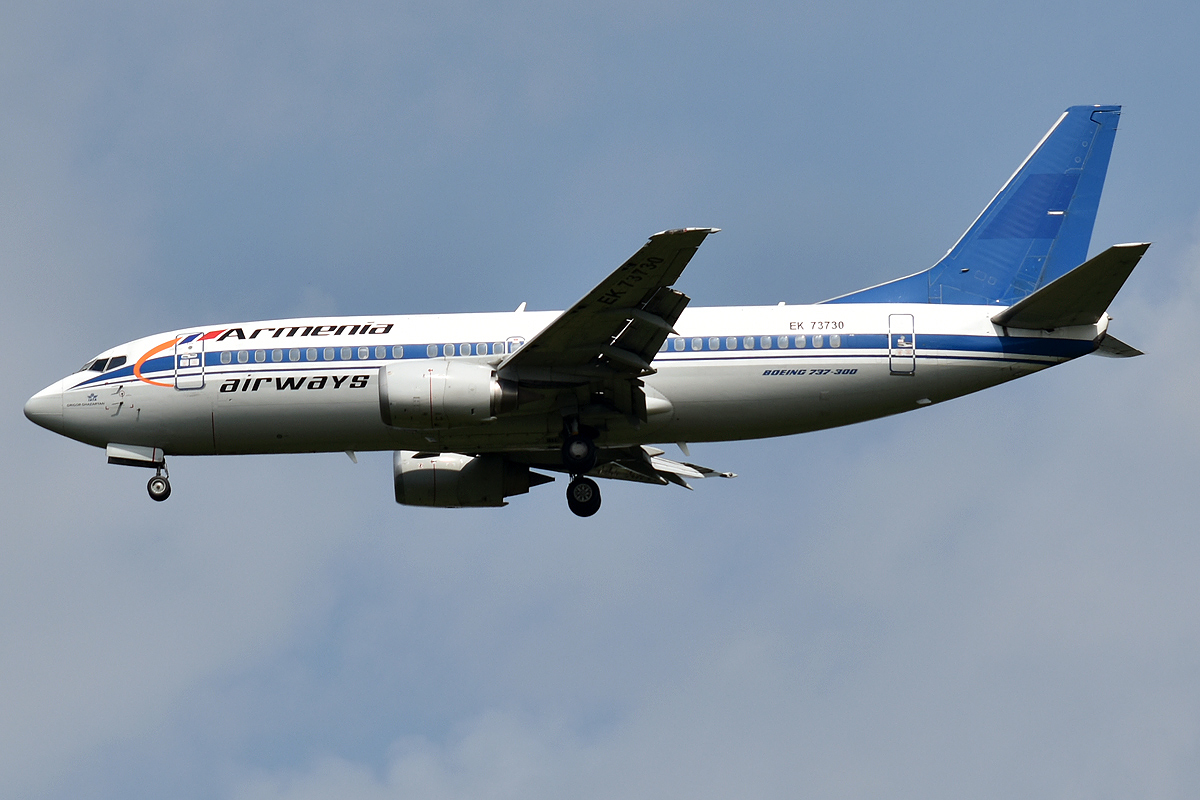
- Boeing 737-300
IATA	ICAO	Call sign
6A	AMW	ARMENIA
- Founded: 2013
- AOC #: 063
- Operating bases: Zvartnots International Airport
- Fleet size: 2
- Destinations: 6
- Headquarters: Yerevan, Armenia
- Website: armeniaairways.am

Armenia Airways Air Company (Armenian: Արմենիա Էյրվեյզ) is an Armenian carrier with headquarters in Yerevan, Armenia, and flight operations based at Zvartnots International Airport in Yerevan. The airline is banned from flying into European Union airspace.

== History ==
Armenia Airways commenced operating on 15 June 2019 from Yerevan to Tehran with a BAe 146-300. It operates two Boeing 737s and are expecting two more aircraft in the near future.

== Destinations ==
Country	City	Airport	Notes	Refs
Armenia	Yerevan	Zvartnots International Airport	Hub	
Georgia	Batumi	Alexander Kartveli Batumi International Airport	Terminated	
Georgia	Tbilisi	Shota Rustaveli Tbilisi International Airport	Terminated	
Iran	Tehran	Imam Khomeini International Airport		
Russia	Moscow	Vnukovo International Airport		
Russia	Sochi	Adler-Sochi International Airport	Terminated	
Russia	Stavropol	Stavropol Shpakovskoye Airport	Terminated	

== Fleet ==
Armenia Airways received its first aircraft in 2018, a Boeing 737-500 leased from Shirak Avia.

As of August 2025, Armenia Airways operates the following aircraft:

Armenia Airways fleet
Aircraft	In Service	In order	Passenger			Notes
Aircraft	In Service	In order	C	Y	Total	Notes
Boeing 737-300	2	2	—	148	148	

== See also ==
- List of airlines of Armenia
- List of airports in Armenia
- List of the busiest airports in Armenia
- Transport in Armenia
