= GDCA =

GDCA may refer to:

- Global Digital Currency Association
- Game Developers Choice Awards
- General Department of Civil Aviation of Armenia
