= FlyOne =

Low-cost airline of Moldova

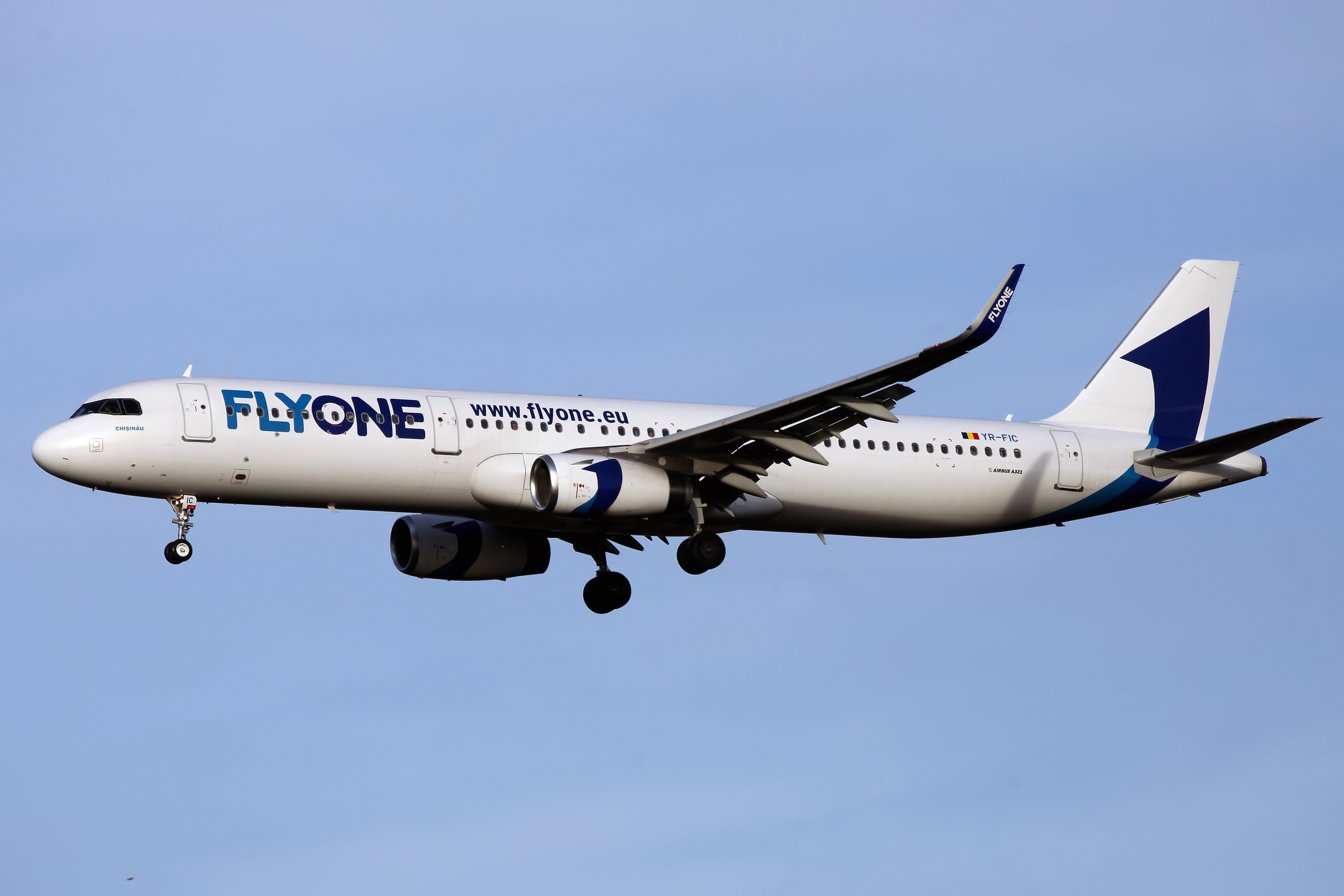
- Airbus A321
IATA	ICAO	Call sign
5F	FIA	FIA AIRLINES
- Founded: 1 May 2015; 11 years ago
- Commenced operations: June 2016; 10 years ago
- Operating bases: Bucharest–Otopeni; Chișinău; Tashkent; Yerevan
- Subsidiaries: FlyOne Armenia; FlyOne Asia; FlyOne Airlines
- Fleet size: 17
- Destinations: 56
- Headquarters: Chișinău, Moldova
- Website: flyone.eu/en/

FLY ONE Moldova, commonly styled FlyOne, is a Moldovan low-cost airline headquartered in Chișinău, Moldova. Launched as a privately owned company in 2016, it managed in a short time to become one of the leaders of the aviation industry in Republic of Moldova. It operates scheduled and charter flights from its bases.

== History ==
The airline received its Air Operator Certificate in late March 2016, and operated its first scheduled passenger flights in June 2016 to Antalya, Heraklion, and Rhodes. Since 2021, it has had a subsidiary FlyOne Armenia operating from Yerevan, Armenia. In July 2025, the airline acquired Uzbek airline, Asia Union Airlines, and rebranded it to FlyOne Asia.

== Destinations ==
FlyOne currently operates direct flights to the following destinations:

Country	City	Airport	Notes	Refs
Albania	Tirana	Tirana International Airport Nënë Tereza		
Armenia	Gyumri	Gyumri Shirak International Airport		
Armenia	Yerevan	Zvartnots International Airport	Base	
Austria	Vienna	Vienna International Airport		
Azerbaijan	Baku	Heydar Aliyev International Airport		
Belgium	Brussels	Brussels Airport		
Bulgaria	Burgas	Burgas Airport	Seasonal	
Cyprus	Larnaca	Larnaca International Airport		
Cyprus	Paphos	Paphos International Airport		
Denmark	Copenhagen	Copenhagen Airport		
Egypt	Sharm El Sheikh	Sharm El Sheikh International Airport	Seasonal Charter	
Egypt	Hurghada	Hurghada International Airport	Terminated	
Egypt	Marsa Alam	Marsa Alam International Airport	Terminated	
France	Nice	Nice Côte d'Azur Airport	Seasonal	
France	Lyon	Lyon–Saint Exupéry Airport		
France	Paris	Charles de Gaulle Airport		
Georgia	Batumi	Batumi International Airport	Terminated	
Georgia	Tbilisi	Shota Rustaveli Tbilisi International Airport		
Germany	Berlin	Berlin Brandenburg Airport		
Germany	Bremen	Bremen Airport		
Germany	Cologne	Cologne Bonn Airport		
Germany	Dresden	Dresden Airport	Begins 17 December 2026	
Germany	Düsseldorf	Düsseldorf Airport		
Germany	Frankfurt	Frankfurt–Hahn Airport		
Germany	Munich	Munich Airport		
Germany	Stuttgart	Stuttgart Airport		
Greece	Heraklion	Heraklion International Airport		
Greece	Thessaloniki	Thessaloniki Airport		
Iran	Tehran	Tehran Imam Khomeini International Airport	Terminated	
Ireland	Dublin	Dublin Airport		
India	Delhi	Indira Gandhi International Airport	Begins 6 November 2026	
Israel	Tel Aviv	Ben Gurion Airport		
Italy	Milan	Milan Malpensa Airport		
Italy	Naples	Naples-Capodichino International Airport		
Italy	Parma	Parma Airport		
Italy	Rome	Leonardo da Vinci Rome Fiumicino Airport		
Italy	Turin	Turin Airport		
Italy	Verona	Verona Villafranca Airport		
Kazakhstan	Almaty	Almaty International Airport		
Latvia	Riga	Riga International Airport		
Moldova	Chișinău	Chișinău Eugen Doga International Airport	Base	
Montenegro	Tivat	Tivat Airport	Seasonal Charter	
Netherlands	Amsterdam	Amsterdam Airport Schiphol		
Portugal	Lisbon	Lisbon Airport		
Qatar	Doha	Hamad International Airport	Seasonal charter	
Romania	Bucharest	Bucharest Henri Coandă International Airport	Base	
Russia	Grozny	Kadyrov Grozny International Airport		
Russia	Kazan	Ğabdulla Tuqay Kazan International Airport		
Russia	Krasnodar	Krasnodar International Airport		
Russia	Mineralnye Vody	Mineralnye Vody Airport		
Russia	Moscow	Moscow Domodedovo Airport		
Russia	Moscow	Sheremetyevo International Airport		
Russia	Moscow	Vnukovo International Airport		
Russia	Novosibirsk	Tolmachevo Airport		
Russia	Saint Petersburg	Pulkovo Airport		
Russia	Samara	Kurumoch International Airport		
Russia	Sochi	Sochi International Airport		
Russia	Voronezh	Voronezh International Airport	Terminated	
Russia	Yekaterinburg	Koltsovo International Airport		
Serbia	Belgrade	Belgrade Nikola Tesla Airport	Begins 15 December 2026	
Spain	Alicante	Alicante–Elche Miguel Hernández Airport		
Spain	Barcelona	Josep Tarradellas Barcelona–El Prat Airport	Seasonal	
Spain	Madrid	Madrid–Barajas Airport	Seasonal	
Spain	Málaga	Málaga–Costa del Sol Airport		
Spain	Palma de Mallorca	Son Sant Joan Airport	Seasonal	
Spain	Valencia	Valencia Airport	Seasonal	
Switzerland	Geneva	Geneva Airport		
Tajikistan	Dushanbe	Dushanbe International Airport		
Turkey	Antalya	Antalya Airport	Seasonal Charter	
Turkey	Bodrum	Milas–Bodrum Airport	Seasonal	
Turkey	Istanbul	Istanbul Airport		
United Arab Emirates	Dubai	Al Maktoum International Airport	Seasonal	
United Arab Emirates	Dubai	Dubai International Airport		
United Arab Emirates	Sharjah	Sharjah International Airport		
United Kingdom	London	London Luton Airport		
United Kingdom	London	London Stansted Airport		
United Kingdom	Manchester	Manchester Airport	Terminated	
Uzbekistan	Tashkent	Tashkent International Airport	Base	

== Fleet ==
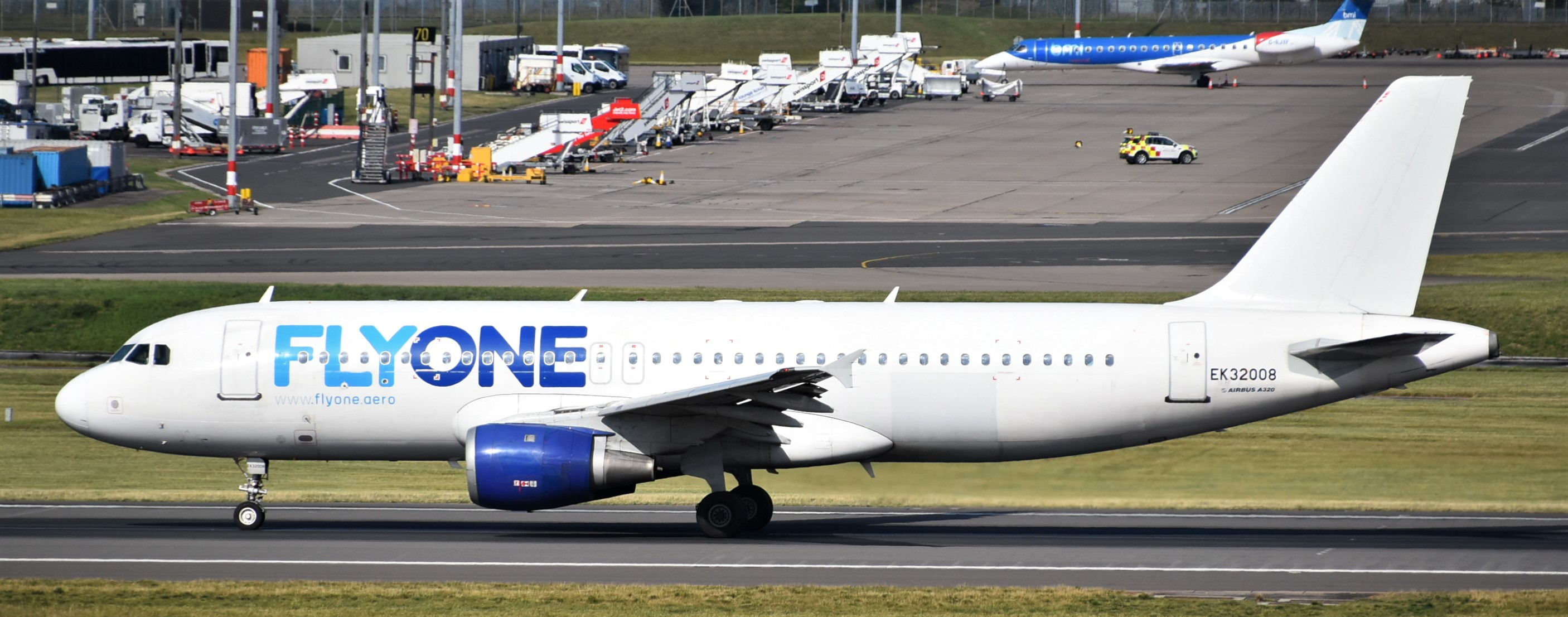
FlyOne Airbus A320

As of June 2024, FlyOne operates an all-Airbus fleet composed of the following aircraft:

FlyOne fleet
Aircraft	In service	Orders	Passengers	Notes
Airbus A320-200	11	1	180	1 leased from Sky Angkor Airlines
Airbus A321-200	6	—	220	
Airbus A321neo	—	2	TBA	
Total	17	3		
