= Arzni Airport =

Arzni Airport Արզնի օդանավակայան
- IATA: N/A; ICAO: UD21

Summary
- Airport type: Military aviation
- Owner: Government of Armenia
- Operator: Ministry of Defence of Armenia
- Location: Nor Hachn
- Elevation AMSL: 1,371 m / 4,501 ft
- Coordinates: 40°17.51′N 44°34.11′E

Map
- Location within Armenia

Runways
Direction	Length		Surface
Direction	m	ft	Surface
05/23	1,004	3,295	Concrete
18/36	991	3,252	Concrete

Arzni Airport (Armenian: Արզնի օդանավակայան) (previously known as Yerevan Yeghvard Airport) (Armenian: Երևան Եղվարդ օդանավակայան) is a military airport located near the town of Nor Hachn, 13 km (8 mi) north of Yerevan and 2 km (1 mi) west of Arzni.

The airport serves as a training base and is attached to the Armenak Khanperyants Military Aviation University, operated by the Ministry of Defence of Armenia. The airport also hosts several military exhibitions and training exercises as well as RC Aircraft events. The airport currently hosts several Antonov An-2, Yak-52 and Piper Archer aircraft as well as several Mil Mi-2 helicopters used for training.

== See also ==
- Armed Forces of Armenia
- List of airports in Armenia
- List of the busiest airports in Armenia
- Military of Armenia
- Transport in Armenia
