= Strigino International Airport =

Airport in Russia

Strigino International Airport Международный аэропорт Стригино

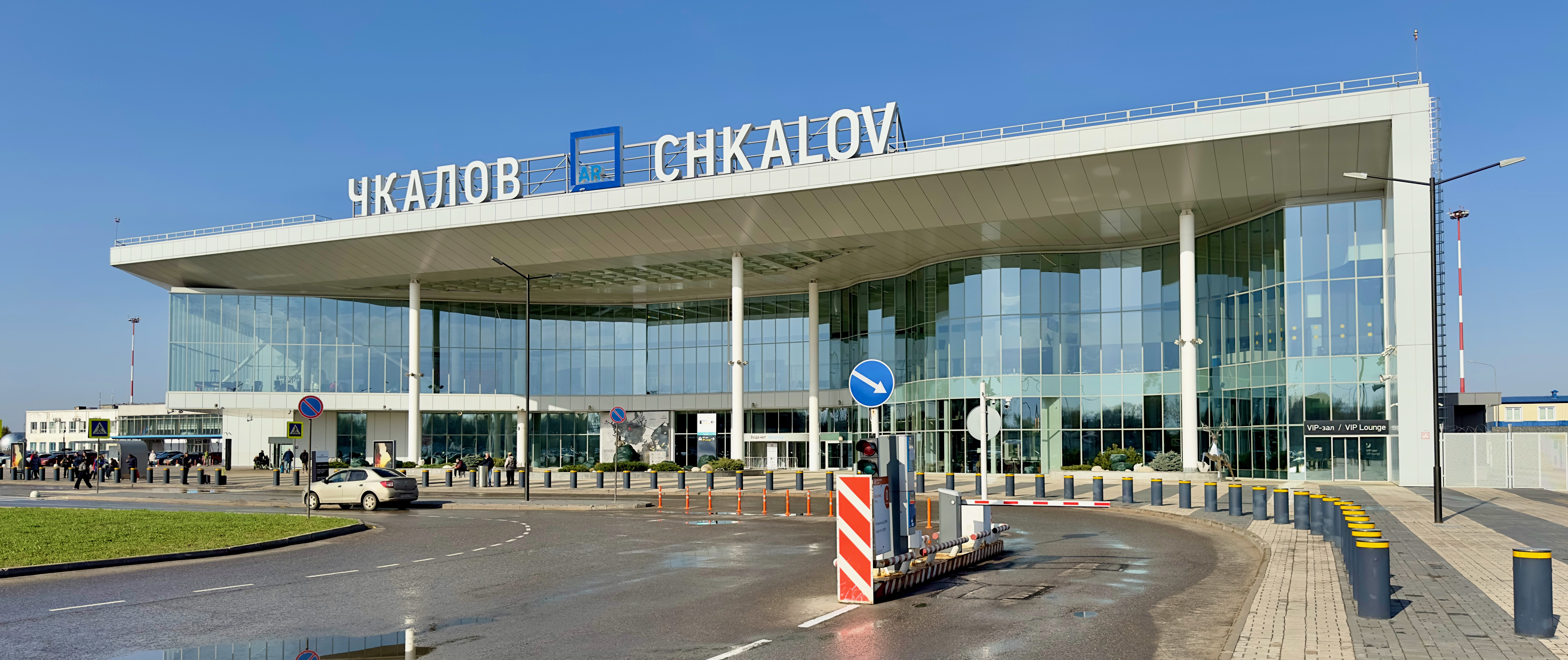
- IATA: GOJ; ICAO: UWGG; LID: НЖС

Summary
- Airport type: International
- Owner: JSC "Nizhny Novgorod International Airport"
- Operator: HC Airports of Regions
- Serves: Nizhny Novgorod
- Location: Nizhny Novgorod, Russia
- Elevation AMSL: 256 ft / 78 m
- Coordinates: 56°13′48″N 43°47′12″E
- Website: ar-goj.ru

Maps
- Location of the airport in Nizhniy Novgorod Oblast Location of the airport in Russia Location of the airport in Europe GOJ (Europe)
- Interactive map of Strigino International Airport

Runways
Direction	Length		Surface
Direction	m	ft	Surface
06/24	500	1,640	Asphalt
15/33	600	1,969	Asphalt
18R/36L	2,805	9,203	Concrete
18L/36R	3,000	9,843	Asphalt

Statistics (2018)
- Passenger Traffic: 1,134,534
- Aircraft Traffic: ▲9,449
- Time Zone: UTC +3
- Operating Time: 24/7, All Year
- Sources: Russian Federal Air Transport Agency (see also provisional 2018 statistics)

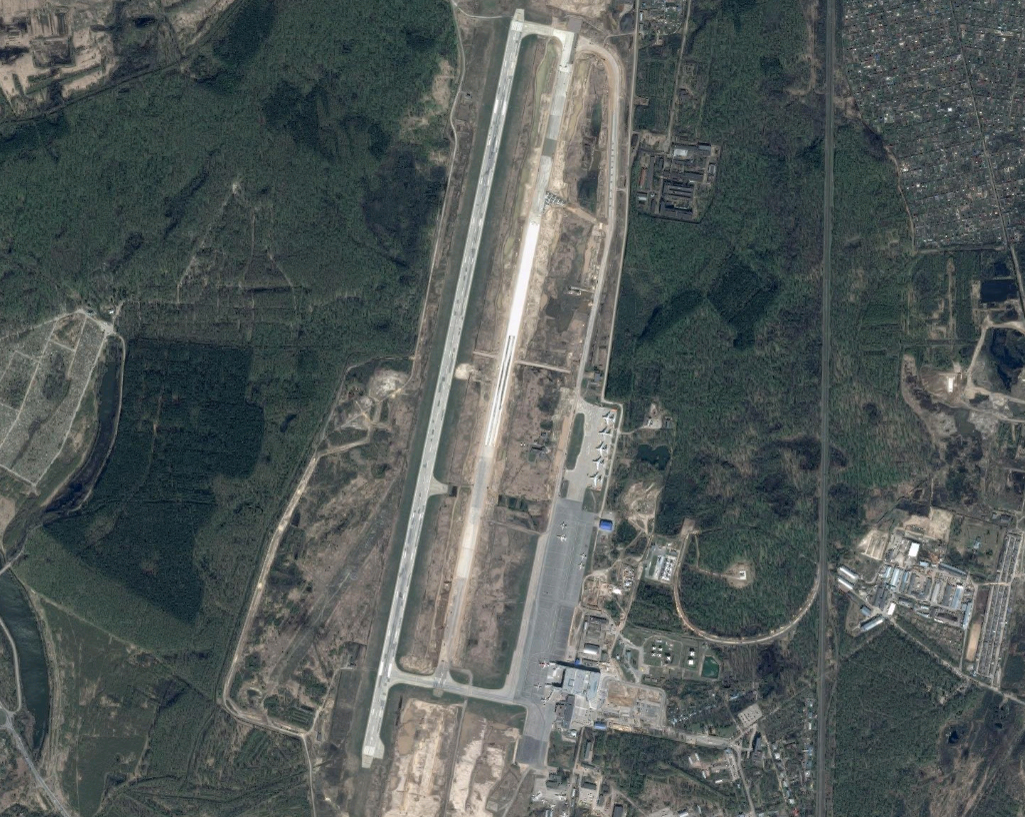
Airport View from the air

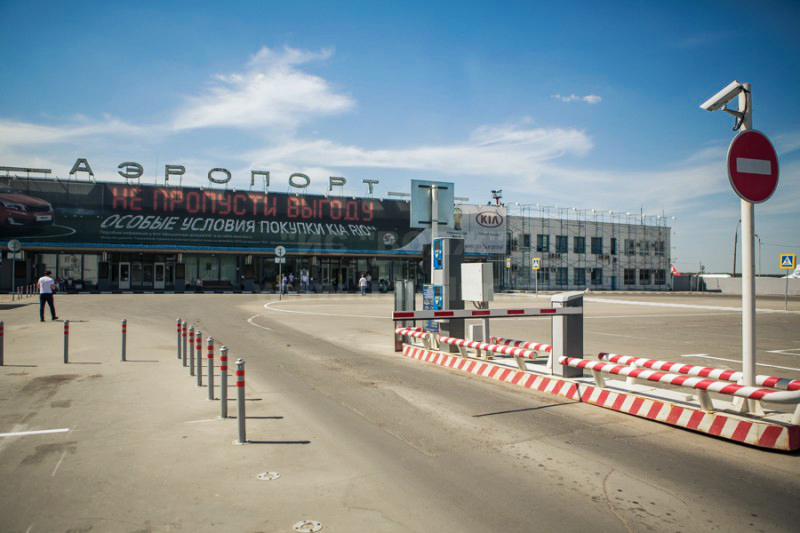
The old terminal of Nizhny Novgorod - Strigino.

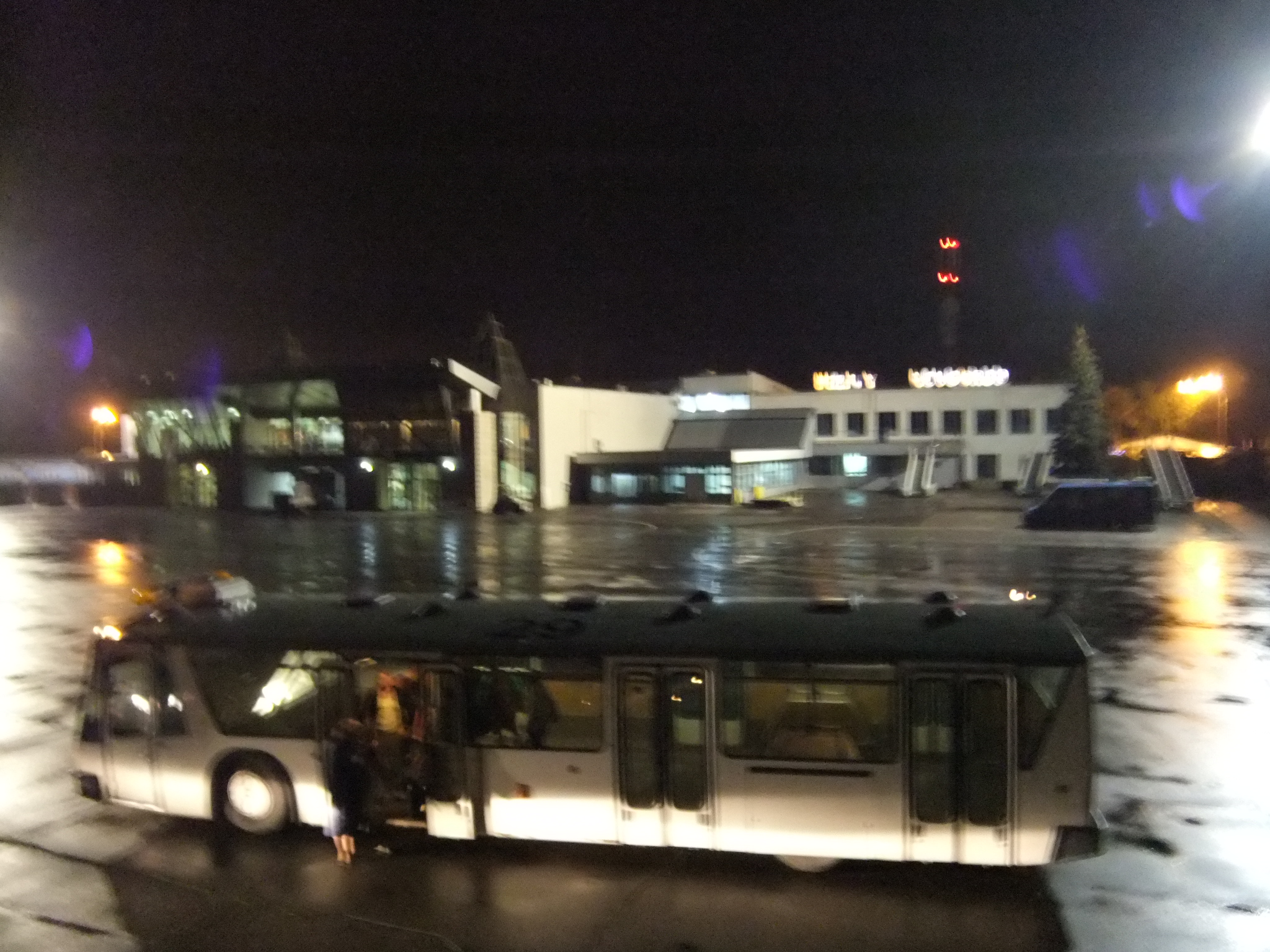
Apron bus at Nizhy Novgorod - Strigino.

Strigino Airport (Russian: Аэропорт Стригино (IATA: GOJ, ICAO: UWGG)) (also referred to as Nizhny Novgorod International Airport (Russian: Международный аэропорт Нижний Новгород)) is the international airport serving the city of Nizhny Novgorod, Russia. It is located on the outskirts of the city's Avtozavodsky District, 14 km (8.5 mi) southwest of city centre. Strigino is responsible for serving the 3,281,000 residents of the Nizhny Novgorod Oblast.

== Description ==
Strigino was officially exploited on 23 July 1923, as a domestic airport. Nizhny Novgorod International Airport is one of the oldest airports in Russia. In 2013, Strigino served 917,424 passengers, a +22.8% increase from the passenger traffic of 2012. Nizhny Novgorod's airport served 777,134 (+29.6%) passengers as of 1 September 2014. Strigino is one of the top 25 busiest airports in Russia. Its extraordinarily rapid increase in passenger traffic rate (≤+20.0% annually) is speculated to bring it to top 10 busiest airports in Russia by 2020.

== History ==
=== 1923–1994 ===
It is unknown when the first aerodrome in Nizhny Novgorod was built, but its location was 0.5 km north from where the "Moscow" movie theater stands today. This aerodrome was named Nizhny Novgorod Airport. On 23 July 1923, the first domestic and regular flight in Russia was from Khodynka Airport, Moscow, to Nizhny Novgorod Airport, Nizhny Novgorod. The flight was carried on a 4-seated Junkers F. 13.

In 1937, due to Gorky's (Nizhny Novgorod's official name between 1932 and 1990) spontaneous population increase, the USSR Council of Ministers ordered that a new aerodrome be built outside the city's municipal district. In 1938, the new "Strigino" airport completed construction. Today, Nizhny Novgorod International Airport is still located in the same general location as the Strigino airport. The new runways could handle the Douglas DC-3, Junker F. 13, Junker A. 35, and other light-weight aircraft.

In World War 2, the airport served as an air base for the 201st air division. In 1950, 5 years after the war, the division was regrouped into the 148th air division and relocated to air bases in the Far East.

In 1963, a new domestic terminal began construction. The terminal completed construction in 1965, and had its first passengers that same year. This terminal is still used today as Strigino's main facility for departures and arrivals. Also in 1963, a new enterprise "Nizhny Novgorod United Air Group" was formed. This group operated the airport from 1963 to 1994. From 1966 to 1973, a new administrative zone, repair hangar, cargo terminal, and hostel completed construction. Additionally, Strigino's apron was expanded and runway lengthened and reinforced.

Between 1976 and 1983, a second concrete runway finished optimization and a 6-storey "Aeroflot" hotel was built. In 1989, Strigino hit it passenger traffic record of approximately 1,030,000. Renovations of Terminal A (main terminal) was made in 1991 after the dissolution of the USSR, and in 1993 in preparation for gaining international status.

=== 1994–2011 ===
In 1994, after the fall of the Soviet Union and a rapid increase in international flights, and after the airport passed the ICAO Category I standards, Strigino was given international status. Also in 1994, the "Nizhny Novgorod United Air Group" was split into 3 new companies: the state-owned "Nizhny Novgorod International Airport", the "Nizhny Novgorod Airlines" airline company, and the "Aeronavigation NN".

In 2003, after a steady decrease in passenger traffic and a lack of sufficient funds, Nizhny Novgorod International Airport went bankrupt and was forced to host multiple auctions. In 2004, the traffic rate began to rise again, but at a relatively low pace. This was due to a certain locked cycle involving NN's low potential. Nizhny Novgorod needed more passengers in order to start receiving investments. But in order to have more passengers, a new modern terminal was needed to be built, to set a more pleasant environment. However, there weren't enough funds to build the new terminal, and the cycle refreshes.

=== 2011–present ===
In 2011, HC Airports of Regions won their bid on the investment project into Nizhny Novgorod International Airport. In 2012, certain renovations were made in order to more efficiently exploit the existing facility whilst the new one was being built.

In June 2014, the construction of the new terminal started. It was planned to be open by December 2015 and to be able to handle around 300 passengers per hour. The second terminal will be built after the 2018 World Cup, which is being hosted by Nizhny Novgorod among other cities, and the aforementioned railway station is planned to be constructed during that time as well. The new terminal was opened on 29 December 2015 when the first flight, from Moscow, was directed there. The airport authority planned to redirect all the domestic flights to the new terminal by February 2016, and all the international flights by April 2016.

== Passenger statistics ==
2004	2005	2006	2007	2008	2009	2010	2011	2012	2013	2014
▲175,385	▲197,672	▲220,573	▲284,520	▲356,362	▼299,721	▲376,799	▲461,424	▲747,165	▲917,424	▲1,131,874

== Construction ==
=== Terminals ===
==== Decision for new terminal ====
Strigino's intense passenger traffic rate increase provoked an interest from multiple stock companies, including Basel Aero and HC Airports of Regions. AoR (Airports of Regions) won their bid on the investment project in Strigino in 2011. That same year they developed a 10-year reconstruction plan from 2011 to 2021, broken down into 3 phases.

==== Terminal 1 ====
This is the old terminal building which still works currently, and before the opening of the new terminal in 2016, it used to serve both Domestic and International flights. The current occupation for this terminal is under decision.

==== Terminal 2 ====
This is the new airport terminal which was constructed on 4 March 2016, where, in the same day, it has begun the testing passenger operations, the real operations commencing is under the decision. The difference between the terminal one and terminal two, is that terminal 2 contains air-bridges and it has a much bigger building. The current occupation for this terminal is under decision.

=== Railway ===
It is proposed that Nizhny Novgorod International Airport will in future serve as the 5th airport of Moscow. Certain measures have been taken to cement that idea. It has been officially confirmed that the Moscow to Kazan high-speed rail will pass through the Strigino Airport. The railway will go from Moscow's Kursk Railway Station to the planned railway station 700 m (2,300 ft) from the airport's new terminal. The ride is estimated at 2 hours. This major project is planned to bring over 6,000,000 passengers from Moscow to Nizhny Novgorod Int. Airport by 2025.

=== Phase I ===
Phase I consists of the construction of a new terminal: Terminal B. The terminal will be 27,800 m^{2} (299,000 sq ft) and will have 4 jet bridges, supplied by the ThyssenKrupp company. Terminal B will be 3 stories high, and will be able to support 1,500,000 passengers annually. Phase I also consists of building an 800 slot parking lot with 28 slots for handicapped citizens. The airport's designs were made by the Hintan Associates company. Phase I is set to be done on 31 December 2015.

=== Phase II/ Phase III ===
Phase II takes into consideration the construction of a 4-star hotel, the high-speed railway station, and the expansion of the terminal. The expansion consists of an additional 2 jet bridges and 8,000 m^{2} (86,000 sq ft). Phase III includes added 2 more jet bridges and 10,000 m^{2} (108,000 sq ft) of total terminal area, as well as the construction of several business centers and a cargo terminal. Phase II is said to be completed by 2018, whilst Phase III should be completed in 2020.

== Airlines and destinations ==
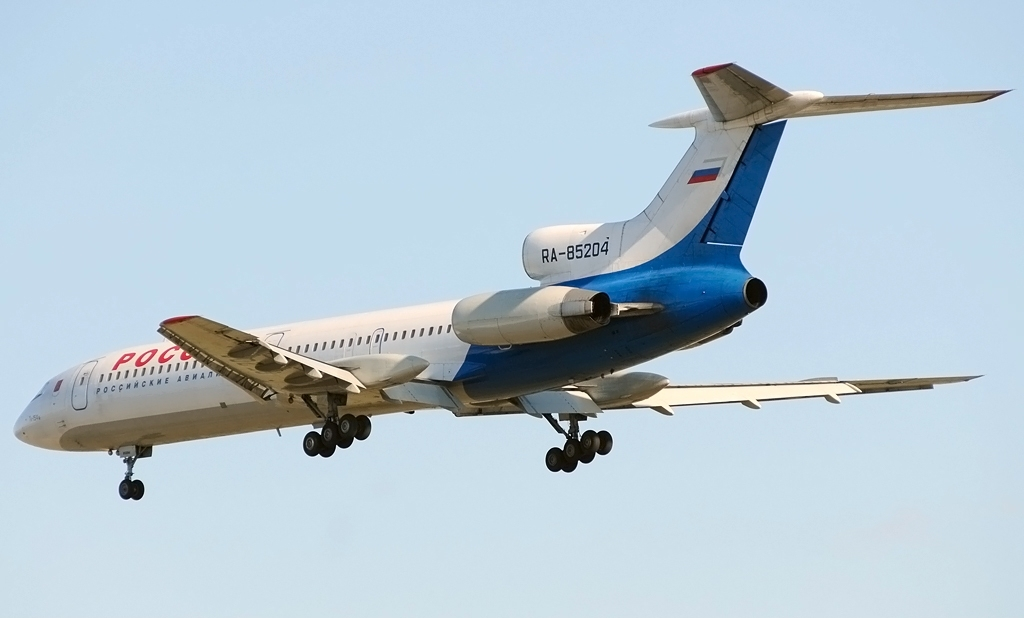
Rossiya Tupolev Tu-154M landing at Nizhny Novgorod - Strigino.

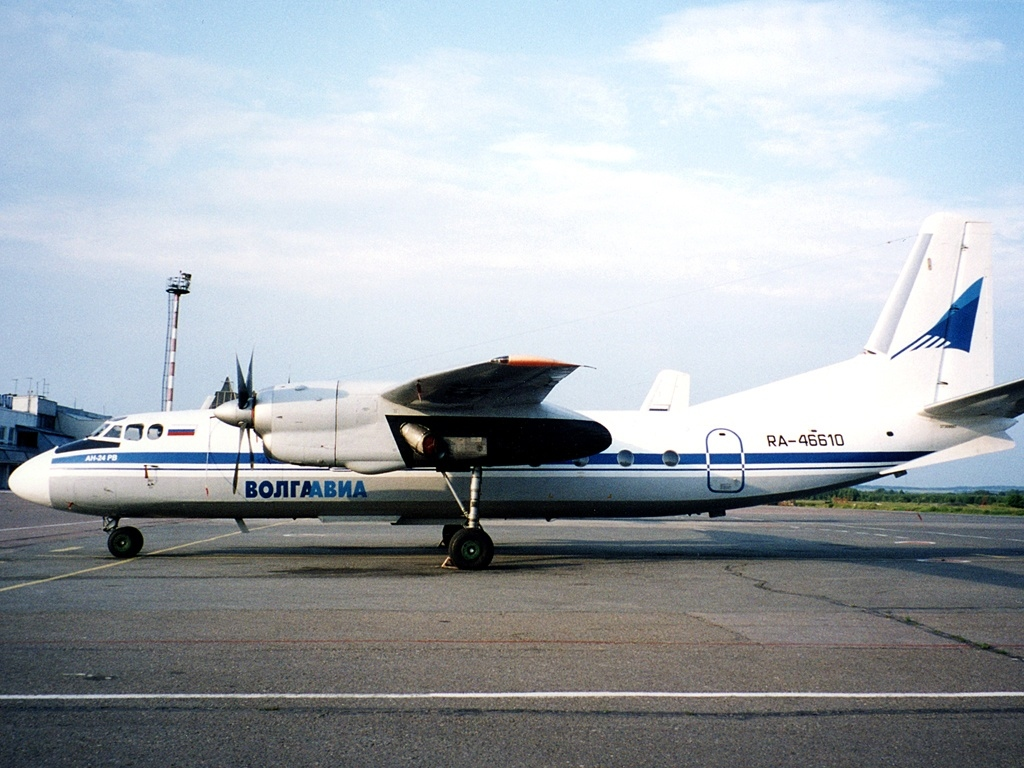
Volga-Avia Antonov An-24 at Nizhny Novgorod - Strigino.

As of May 2026 airport serves following destinations:

Airlines	Destinations
Aeroflot	Minsk, Moscow–Sheremetyevo; Seasonal: Antalya
Air Anka	Seasonal charter: Antalya
Air Serbia	Belgrade
AlMasria Universal Airlines	Seasonal charter: Sharm El Sheikh
Armenian Airlines	Yerevan (begins 5 June 2026)
Azur Air	Seasonal charter: Antalya
Ikar	Sochi, Ufa
Nordwind Airlines	Kaliningrad, Mineralnye Vody, Sochi
Red Wings Airlines	Samara, Tbilisi, Yekaterinburg; Seasonal: Batumi, Yerevan
Rossiya Airlines	Moscow–Sheremetyevo, Saint Petersburg; Seasonal charter: Hurghada, Sharm El Sheikh
S7 Airlines	Novosibirsk
Shirak Avia	Yerevan
Smartavia	Saint Petersburg
Southwind Airlines	Seasonal charter: Antalya
UVT Aero	Chelyabinsk, Kazan, Orenburg
Uzbekistan Airlines	Tashkent

== Ground transportation ==
The airport can be reached by taxi, bus #11 from Metro station 'Park kultury', microbus (marshrutka) #29 from Metro station 'Park kultury' and bus #20 from the railway station. However, taxi is the most common way for the passengers to reach the airport since the bus stop was moved further away from the airport building entrance.

The Nizhny Novgorod - Arzamas railway line runs close to the airport. As of 2008, the authorities were studying the feasibility of constructing a railway branch into the airport, and a train station there, with a view to running trains from there to Nizhny Novgorod's main railway station.

== See also ==
- List of the busiest airports in Russia
- List of the busiest airports in Europe
- List of the busiest airports in the former USSR
