= Goris Airport =

Armenian airport

Coordinates: 39°27′03″N 46°20′47″E

Goris Airport, also known as Shinuyar Airport or Shinuhayr Airport, is located to the south of Goris, near the village of Shinuhayr, Syunik Province, Armenia. It has been closed since the collapse of the USSR in 1991. However, the government of Armenia planned on reconstructing the airport and opening it to public and private service. As of September 2023, reconstruction of the airport remains ongoing.

== See also ==
- List of airports in Armenia
- List of the busiest airports in Armenia
- Transport in Armenia
