= Stepanavan Airport =

- IATA: none; ICAO: UDLS

Summary
- Airport type: Public
- Owner: Ministry of Emergency Situations of Armenia
- Operator: Ministry of Emergency Situations of Armenia
- Serves: Stepanavan
- Location: Stepanavan, Lori, Armenia
- Elevation AMSL: 4,836 ft / 1,474 m
- Coordinates: 41°02′54″N 44°20′13″E
- Interactive map of Stepanavan Airport

Runways
Direction	Length		Surface
Direction	ft	m	Surface
13/31	6,555	1,998	Asphalt

Stepanavan Airport (ICAO: UDLS) is a civil airport serving the city of Stepanavan and the province of Lori, in the country of Armenia. The airport was built in the early 1970s and has since undergone several renovations to improve its facilities and services. It is located 6 km (3.7 mi) northwest of the center of Stepanavan.

In 2014, reconstruction of the administrative buildings of "Stepanavan" Airport JSC and Kapan airport included replacing fencing and renovation of the runway of the airports. The Ministry of Emergency Situations of Armenia will use the airport to fight wildfires. Talks are currently underway with the Russian government about purchasing several fire-fighting aircraft; most probably Beriev Be-200 aircraft.

== See also ==
- List of airports in Armenia
- List of the busiest airports in Armenia
- Transport in Armenia
