= List of airports in Armenia =

This is a list of airports in Armenia, sorted by location.

== Airports ==
As of July 2025, Armenia has three functional civil airports.

City served	Province	ICAO	IATA	Airport name	Opened	Runway	Coordinates
Yerevan	Yerevan	UDYZ	EVN	Zvartnots International Airport	1961	3,850 m (12,630 ft)	40°08′50″N 044°23′45″E
Gyumri	Shirak	UDSG	LWN	Gyumri Shirak International Airport	1961	3,220 m (10,560 ft)	40°45′01″N 043°51′33″E
Kapan	Syunik	UDCK	YUK	Syunik Airport	2023	1,750 m (5,740 ft)	39°12′08″N 046°27′15″E

== Military airports ==
City served	Province	ICAO	IATA	Airport name	Opened	Runway	Coordinates
Yerevan	Yerevan	UDYE		Erebuni Airport	1938	2,650 m (8,690 ft)	40°07′19″N 044°27′53″E
Nor Hachn	Kotayk	UD21		Arzni Airport (Military Aviation University)	1992	1,004 m (3,294 ft)	40°17′30″N 44°34′7″E
Sisian	Syunik			Sisian Airport	1982	1,750 m (5,740 ft)	39°32′49″N 046°03′25″E

== Other airstrips and airfields ==
City served	Province	ICAO	IATA	Airport name	Opened-Ceased	Runway	Coordinates
Berd	Tavush			Berd Airstrip	1959-1990	1,670 m (5,480 ft)	40°55′34″N 045°27′47″E
Gavar	Gegharkunik			Gavar Airstrip	1966-1991		40°22′16″N 045°05′51″E
Jermuk	Vayots Dzor	UGEJ		Jermuk Airstrip	1955-1989	1,600 m (5,200 ft)	39°49′26″N 045°40′24″E
Meghri	Syunik			Meghri Airstrip		1,130 m (3,710 ft)	38°54′41″N 046°11′57″E
Vardenis	Gegharkunik			Vardenis Airstrip		2,000 m (6,600 ft)	40°12′00″N 045°46′33″E
Goris	Syunik	UDGS	OIS	Goris Airport	1979-1991	2,000 m (6,600 ft)	39°27′03″N 046°20′47″E
Stepanavan	Lori	UDLS		Stepanavan Airport	1980-2006	2,000 m (6,600 ft)	41°02′54″N 044°20′13″E

== See also ==
- Armenian Air Force
- General Department of Civil Aviation of Armenia
- List of airlines of Armenia
- List of airports by ICAO code: U#UD – Armenia
- List of airports in the Republic of Artsakh
- List of the busiest airports in Armenia
- Transport in Armenia
- Wikipedia: WikiProject Aviation/Airline destination lists: Asia#Armenia
