= Gyumri Shirak International Airport =

International airport serving Gyumri, Shirak, Armenia

Gyumri Shirak International Airport Գյումրի Շիրակ Միջազգային Oդանավակայան

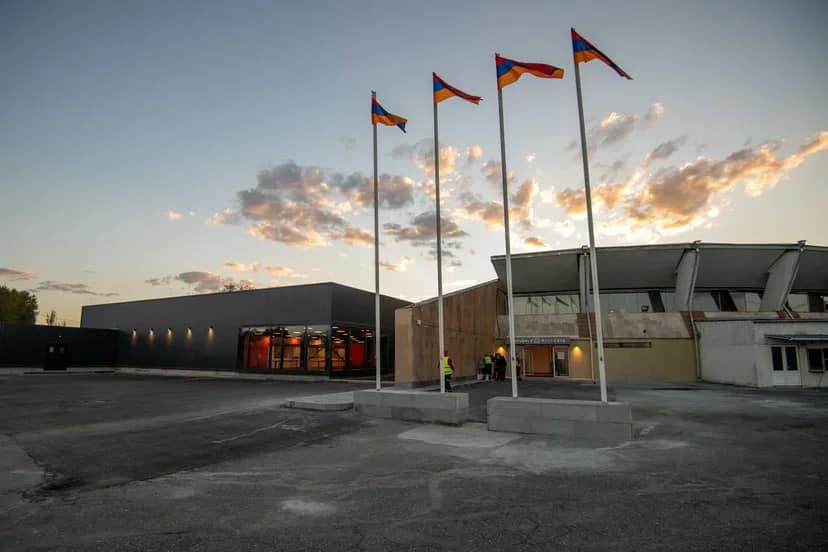
- IATA: LWN; ICAO: UDSG

Summary
- Airport type: International / military
- Owner: General Department of Civil Aviation of Armenia
- Operator: Armenia International Airports CJSC
- Serves: Gyumri
- Location: Gyumri, Shirak Province, Armenia
- Opened: 1961; 65 years ago
- Elevation AMSL: 5,000 ft (1,500 m)
- Coordinates: 40°45′01″N 43°51′33″E
- Website: Shirak Airport

Map
- Location of airport in Armenia LWN (Europe) LWN (West and Central Asia)

Runways
Direction	Length		Surface
Direction	ft	m	Surface
02/20	10,564	3,220	Asphalt

Statistics (2025)
- Total passengers: 138,399 ▲32.4%
- Aircraft movements: 858 ▲23.4%
- Source: CAAP Civil Aviation Committee of Armenia

Gyumri Shirak International Airport (Armenian: Գյումրի Շիրակ Միջազգային Oդանավակայան, romanized: Gyumri Shirak Mijazgayin Odanavakayan) (IATA: LWN, ICAO: UDSG) is an international airport serving Gyumri and the Shirak Province in northwestern Armenia. Located 7 km (4.5 mi) from the center of Gyumri and approximately 120 km (75 mi) from the capital, Yerevan, it is the second-largest airport in the country. It is operated by Armenia International Airports CJSC, a subsidiary of the Argentine company Corporación América.

The airport functions as a joint-use facility, serving as a vital base for the Armenian Air Force while providing commercial services. In recent years, Shirak has been positioned as a strategic relief airport for Yerevan’s Zvartnots International Airport.

First inaugurated in 1961, the airport has undergone a series of significant modernizations. Following a major $7.5 million investment in 2021, the facility saw its runway fully resurfaced and a new arrivals terminal built, tripling its annual passenger capacity to 700,000. As of 2025, the airport has seen record growth, playing a key role in the decentralization of Armenia's aviation sector.

== History ==
=== Soviet foundation and architectural development (1961–1987) ===
Shirak Airport was inaugurated in 1961 to serve the northern regions of the Armenian Soviet Socialist Republic. For its first two decades, it operated as a regional airfield with limited facilities. In 1982, a new Modernist terminal was completed, designed by renowned architects Levon Christophorian and Ruben Hasratyan. The design was part of a broader Soviet-era effort to provide Gyumri (then Leninakan, as reflected in the IATA code LWN still used by the airport) with an infrastructure capable of handling increased regional traffic and military logistics.

=== Earthquake and civil stagnation (1988–2003) ===
Following the catastrophic 1988 Armenian earthquake, the airport became a critical lifeline for international aid and rescue operations. However, the resulting structural damage and the subsequent economic collapse during the early years of Armenian independence left the facility largely inoperable for civilian use. Throughout the 1990s, the airport's role was almost exclusively limited to military operations by the Armenian Air Force.

=== Privatization and initial recovery (2004–2018) ===
A turning point occurred in 2004 when the airport was partially renewed to restore civil operations. Armenia felt the importance of having a second airport, when adverse weather conditions meant that many flights had to be diverted from Yerevan's Zvartnots International Airport into Gyumri's Shirak Airport. In 2007, management was transferred to Armenia International Airports CJSC under a 30-year concession agreement.

- Infrastructure leap: In 2006, the airport installed advanced radar systems with a 400 km radius.
- Technical standards: By 2007, the runway was completely re-asphalted, and a Finnish IDMAN light-signal system was integrated.
- Licensing: That same year, the General Department of Civil Aviation of Armenia granted it an ICAO First Class Airport license.

=== The COVID-19 era and failed Ryanair entry (2020) ===
In early 2020, Shirak was poised for its biggest international expansion with the arrival of Ryanair. The airline planned to launch twice-weekly flights to Athens and Memmingen (Germany) starting in March and May 2020.

- Cancellations: Due to the COVID-19 pandemic and the subsequent state of emergency declared on 16 March 2020, Ryanair suspended all Armenian operations.
- Market exit: While initially framed as a temporary suspension, the airline never resumed its Gyumri routes, officially exiting the Armenian market in late 2020 due to pandemic-related volatility.

=== Modernization and growth (2021–Present) ===
The 2020s marked the "rebirth" of Shirak as a low-cost carrier hub. Driven by the need to decentralize traffic from Yerevan, the operator launched a major modernization program.

- Capacity expansion: On 16 September 2021, a new arrivals hall was inaugurated, tripling the airport's annual capacity to 700,000 passengers.
- Runway upgrades: A $6 million investment saw the 3,220-meter runway fully resurfaced to accommodate larger aircraft like the Airbus A321 and Boeing 737-800.
- Recent statistics: In 2025, passenger traffic at Shirak Airport increased by 32.4% year-on-year, contributing significantly to Armenia's record 5.7 million total air passengers. Construction on a new, expanded departures area was finalized in late 2024 to support this growth.

== Overview ==
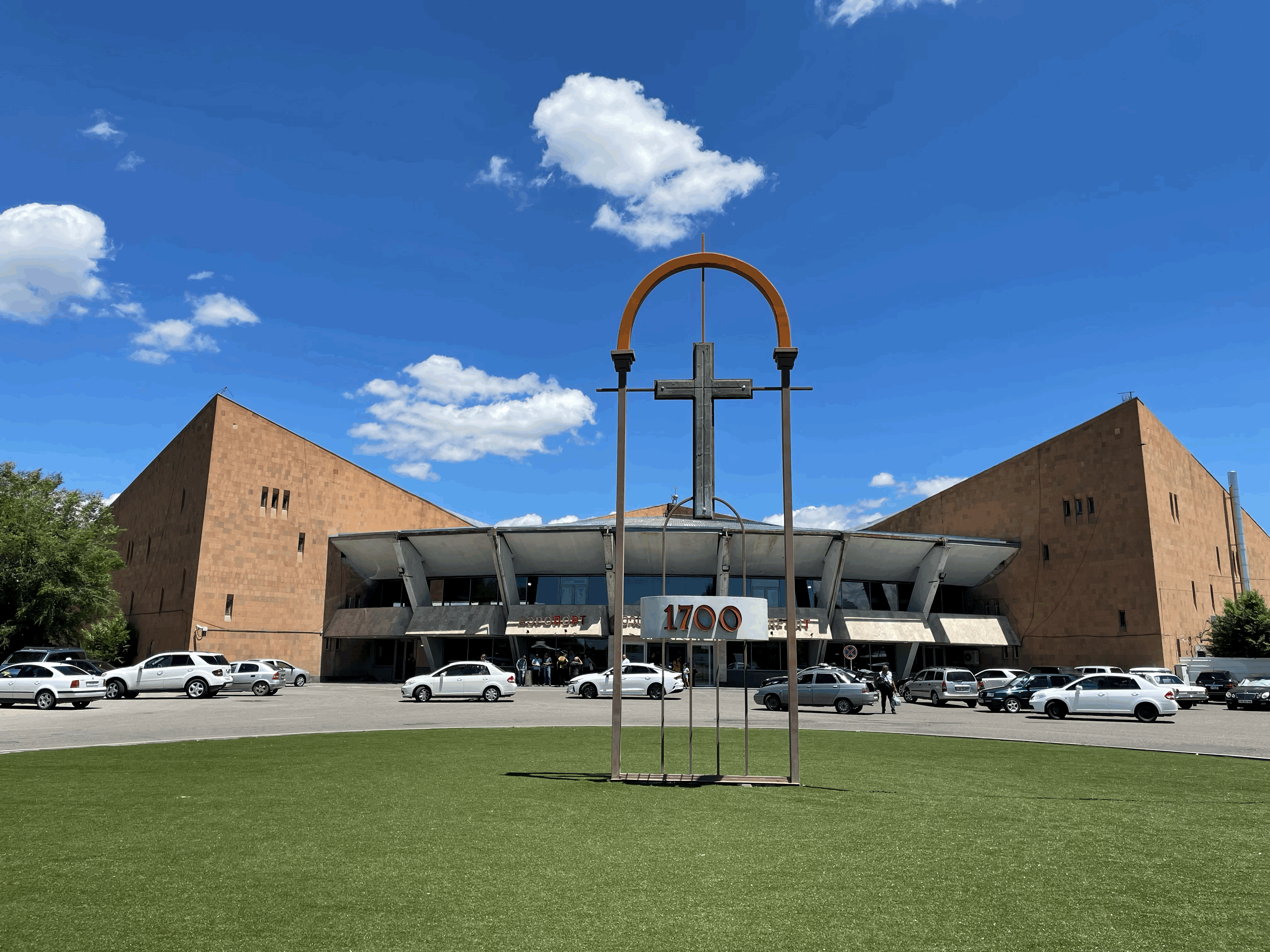
Entrance to the main terminal

Runway 02 is equipped with an ILS CAT I, enabling aircraft operations in low ceiling (60 meters) and visibility (800 meters). The airport is also equipped with a new air traffic control tower and a boiler room, as well as a new arrivals area including five passport control booths and an additional baggage carousel. The airport features a Avolta duty-free shop after security in the departures area. Runway resurfacing works were completed on 16 September 2021, as part of a large-scale modernisation program for the airport.

The airport also serves as an airbase for the Armenian Air Force, which has a large maintenance and operations base with several combat and training aircraft stationed at the north-east of the airfield.

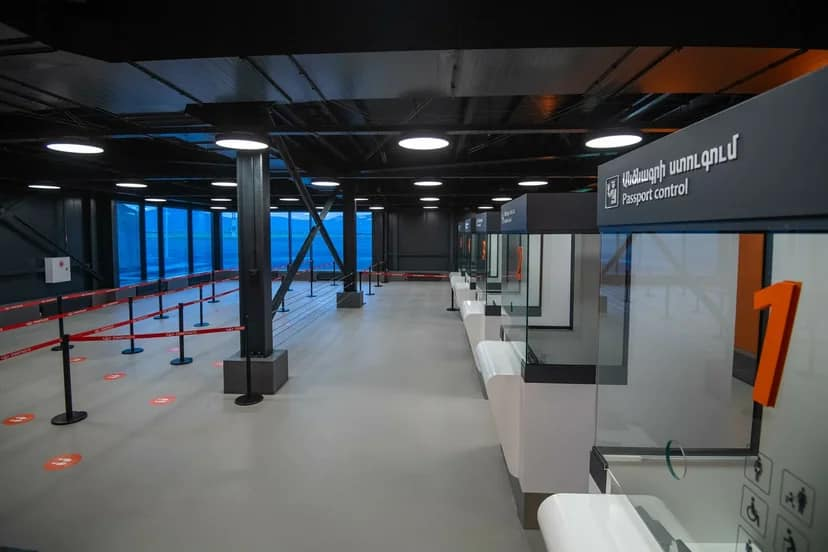
Arrivals area

== Airlines and destinations ==
The following airlines operate regular scheduled flights as of August 2026:

Airlines	Destinations
Aeroflot	Krasnodar
FlyOne	Sochi
Pobeda	Moscow
Wizz Air	Larnaca

== Statistics ==
=== Annual statistics ===
2000s
Year	2005	2006	2007	2008
Total passenger traffic	46,100	46,410	18,630	22,268
Departing passenger traffic	18,800	24,011	11,339	12,911
Arriving passenger traffic	27,300	22,399	7,291	9357
Total freight (tons)	146	18.1	6.2	64.5
Exported freight (tons)	20	3.1	N/A	2.0
Imported freight (tons)	126	15	6.2	62.6
Aircraft movements (departure or landing)	472	355	166	144

2010s
Year	2012	2013	2014	2015	2016	2017	2018	2019
Total passenger traffic	71,568	66,534	37,857	39,328	12,421	105,664	165,946	147,536
Departing passenger traffic	N/A	N/A	N/A	N/A	6,593	52,828	83,574	74,103
Arriving passenger traffic	N/A	N/A	N/A	N/A	5,828	52,836	82,372	73,433
Total freight (tons)	N/A	N/A	0.4	50.8	4.2	2.3	0.6	N/A
Exported freight (tons)	N/A	N/A	N/A	N/A	4	1.3	0.3	N/A
Imported freight (tons)	N/A	N/A	N/A	N/A	0.2	1	0.3	N/A
Aircraft movements (departure and landing)	N/A	N/A	144	152	54	372	488	453

2020s
Year	2020	2021	2022	2023	2024	2025
Total passenger traffic	35,491	122,139	48,492	94,768	104,532	138,399
Departing passenger traffic	17,981	68,071	N/A	47,848	52,399	68,203
Arriving passenger traffic	17,510	54,068	N/A	46,920	52,133	70,196
Total freight (tons)	N/A	N/A	N/A	N/A	N/A	N/A
Exported freight (tons)	N/A	N/A	N/A	N/A	N/A	N/A
Imported freight (tons)	N/A	N/A	N/A	N/A	N/A	N/A
Aircraft movements (departure and landing)	129	1,094	462	588	694	858

== Ground Transportation ==
=== Automobile ===
The airport is accessed via the M1 North-South Road Corridor and the M7 highway, which serves as a primary artery connecting Gyumri to the western border. By car, the distance from Shirak Airport to the center of Gyumri is 7 kilometers (4.5 mi), with a typical travel time of approximately 10 to 15 minutes.

At Shirak Airport, vehicles from international and local car rental companies are available for arriving passengers. The airport features a dedicated parking area located directly in front of the terminal building, providing short-term and long-term options for travelers and visitors – both free of charge.

=== Public Transport ===
Seasonal shuttle buses connect the airport to Gyumri city center and the railway station, timed with flight arrivals.

== See also ==
- Transport in Armenia
- List of the busiest airports in Armenia
- List of the busiest airports in the former USSR
