= Zvartnots International Airport =

Airport near Yerevan, Armenia

Zvartnots International Airport Զվարթնոց Միջազգային Oդանավակայան

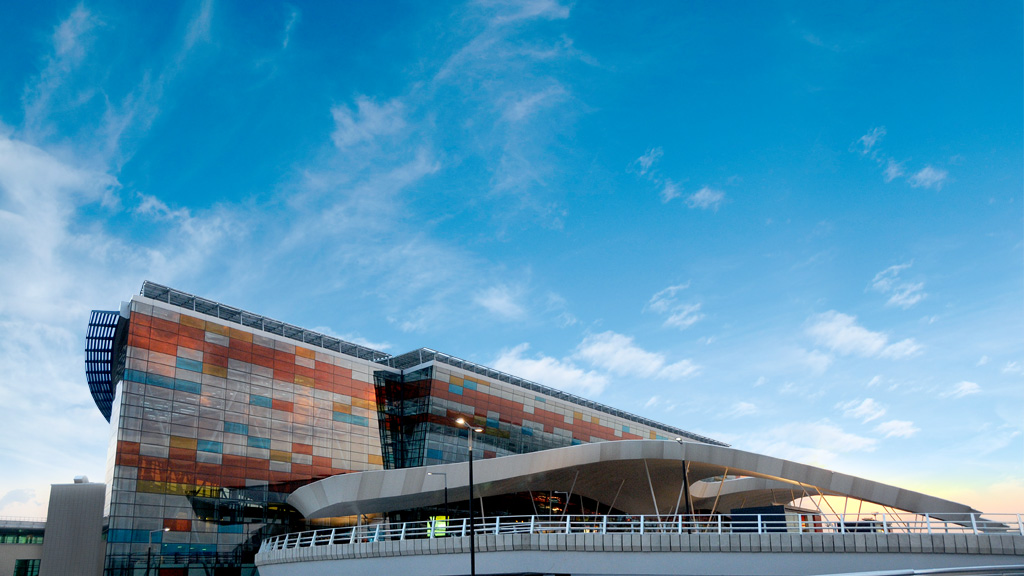
- IATA: EVN; ICAO: UDYZ

Summary
- Airport type: International
- Operator: Armenia International Airports CJSC
- Serves: Yerevan
- Location: Yerevan, Armenia
- Opened: 1961
- Hub for: Armenia Airways; FlyOne Armenia; Novair; Shirak Avia
- Operating base for: Wizz Air
- Elevation AMSL: 2,838 ft (865 m)
- Coordinates: 40°08′50″N 044°23′45″E
- Website: zvartnots.aero

Map
- Location of airport in Armenia EVN (Europe) EVN (West and Central Asia)

Runways
Direction	Length		Surface
Direction	m	ft	Surface
08/26	3,850	12,631	Asphalt/concrete

Statistics (2025)
- Number of passengers: ▲5,615,789
- Passenger change 24-25: ▲7%
- Source: Armenian AIP at EUROCONTROL

Zvartnots International Airport (Armenian: Զվարթնոց միջազգային օդանավակայան, romanized: Zvart'nots' mijazgayin ōdanavakayan) (IATA: EVN, ICAO: UDYZ) is located near Zvartnots, 15 km (9.3 mi) west of Yerevan, the capital city of Armenia. It acts as the main international airport of Armenia and is Yerevan's main international transport hub. It is the busiest airport in the country as well as the 14th-busiest airport in the post-Soviet states.

== History ==
The airport was opened in 1961, and following a design competition held in 1970, Spartak Khachikian, Artur Tarkhanian, George Shekhlian, Mkrtich Mazmanian, Levon Cherkezian, and Sergei Baghdasarian won the right to design the first terminal building. The airport was renovated in the 1980s with the development of a new terminal area, in order to meet domestic traffic demands within the Soviet Union.

When Armenia declared its independence from the Soviet Union in the 1990s, the growth of cargo shipments resulted in the construction of a new cargo terminal in 1998 that can handle about 100,000 tonnes of cargo annually. In 2001, a 30-year concession agreement for the management of operations at the airport was signed with Armenia International Airports CJSC, owned by Argentine company Corporación América, which is in turn owned by Armenian Argentine businessman Eduardo Eurnekian. As part of that agreement, Armenia International Airports CJSC renovated the runways, main taxiways, and ramps. In 2006, a new gate area and arrivals hall opened, followed by an overall improvement of the airport's fire services, including replacing the entire fire-fighting fleet with new vehicles. A new departures and arrivals terminal, car-parking facility with a capacity of 600 vehicles, and a government delegation terminal all opened in 2011. On 30 January 2013, Zvartnots airport was named "Best Airport In the CIS" during the Emerging Markets Airports Award (EMAA) ceremonies held in Dubai, United Arab Emirates.

In March 2024, Armenia officially expelled Russian border guards who had been stationed at the airport. Their withdrawal was completed on 31 July.

== Overview ==
The airport is able to accept aircraft up to and including the Antonov An-225, Boeing 747-400 and Airbus A380. Runway 08 is equipped with an ILS CAT II, which enables aircraft operations in low ceiling (30 meters) and visibility (300 metres).

Zvartnots International Airport recently implemented a new flight information display system (FIDS), a new automated and biometric-identification system for baggage check-in and passenger control, as well as the installation of 150 surveillance cameras across airport premises.

The access to the boarding area is highly secured with three steps, a pre-control, a passport control, and X-ray control. The airport features an Avolta duty-free retail shop after security, as well as the Converse Bank business class lounge, with a view overlooking the gate area and apron. In addition, the airport features a HayPost office, a pharmacy, several dining options and cafes, a Europcar, Beeline, VivaCell MTS, Ardshinbank, as well as, HSBC, VTB Bank, and Ameriabank ATMs.

In December 2019, yearly passenger flow at Zvartnots International Airport exceeded 3 million passengers for the first time in Armenia's history. In 2023, passenger flow at Zvartnots exceeded 5 million passengers for the first time.

In 2025, taxiway A, which has not been in use since the 1970s, was completely renovated and put back into service. Operation of this renovated taxiway will significantly enhance the airport’s operational efficiency. It will also allow for more optimal ground movement of aircraft, increasing the total number of aircraft movement by about 35%.

== Future developments ==
In October 2025, due to unprecedented growth in passenger traffic, Zvartnots airport unveiled plans for a $500 million expansion of the terminal building. The 10-year investment program will double the airport’s capacity. The number of boarding gates will increase from 6 to 16, and the arrivals, passport control, and customs areas will more than double in size. The airport will also gain modern lounges, expanded parking facilities, and improved transportation access for passengers.

In January 2026, Armenia’s government approved an extension of the concession agreement for the airport, pushing the contract’s expiry to the end of 2067 in exchange for major investments. Corporación América Airports, owned by Argentine-Armenian businessman Eduardo Eurnekian, will invest approximately $425 million to expand passenger and cargo infrastructure at the airport.

== Airlines and destinations ==
=== Passenger ===
The following airlines operate regular scheduled and charter services to and from the airport:

Airlines	Destinations
Aegean Airlines	Athens; Seasonal charter: Larnaca
Aeroflot	Krasnodar, Moscow–Sheremetyevo, Saint Petersburg, Yekaterinburg
Air Arabia	Abu Dhabi, Sharjah
airBaltic	Riga
Air Cairo	Cairo, Hurghada, Sharm El Sheikh; Seasonal charter: El Alamein
Air France	Paris–Charles de Gaulle
Air Serbia	Belgrade (begins 28 March 2027)
arkia	Tel Aviv (resumes 2 April 2027)
Armenia Airways	Moscow–Vnukovo, Tehran–Imam Khomeini
Austrian Airlines	Vienna
azimuth	Krasnodar, Mineralnye Vody, Moscow–Vnukovo, Sochi, Ufa
Belavia	Minsk
Brussels Airlines	Brussels
Caspian Airlines	Tehran–Imam Khomeini
China Southern Airlines	Ürümqi
Condor	Seasonal: Frankfurt
Eurowings	Berlin, Düsseldorf
flydubai	Dubai–International
FlyOne	Alicante, Amsterdam, Almaty, Barcelona, Belgrade (begins 15 December 2026), Bergamo, Brussels, Chișinău, Cologne/Bonn,, Heraklion, Kazan, Krasnodar, Larnaca, Milan–Malpensa, Moscow–Domodedovo, Moscow–Vnukovo, Nice, Paphos, Paris–Charles de Gaulle, Rome–Fiumicino, Saint Petersburg, Samarkand (begins June 2027), Sochi, Tashkent, Tbilisi, Tel Aviv, Thessaloniki, Tivat, Vienna, Yekaterinburg; Seasonal: Sharm El Sheikh; Seasonal charter: Doha
Fly Cham	Aleppo
FlyArystan	Aqtau (begins 16 December 2026)
Georgian Airways	Tbilisi
GullivAir	Seasonal: Sofia
Iran Airtour	Tehran–Imam Khomeini
Iraqi Airways	Baghdad
Jazeera Airways	Seasonal: Kuwait City (resumes 3 December 2026)
LOT Polish Airlines	Warsaw–Chopin
Lufthansa	Frankfurt
Middle East Airlines	Beirut
Novair	Kapan
Pegasus Airlines	Istanbul–Sabiha Gökçen
Qatar Airways	Doha
Qeshm Air	Tehran–Imam Khomeini
Red Sea Airlines	Seasonal charter: Sharm El Sheikh
Red Wings Airlines	Chelyabinsk, Kazan, Mineralnye Vody, Moscow–Zhukovsky, Nizhny Novgorod, Samara, Sochi, Ufa
Rossiya Airlines	Mineralnye Vody, Moscow–Sheremetyevo, Saint Petersburg, Samara, Sochi, Volgograd
S7 Airlines	Novosibirsk
SCAT Airlines	Astana
Sepehran Airlines	Tehran–Imam Khomeini
Shirak Avia	Astana, Denpasar, Krasnoyarsk, Malé, Moscow–Sheremetyevo, Moscow–Vnukovo, Nizhny Novgorod, Novosibirsk, Perm, Phuket, Saratov, Tashkent, Ufa; Seasonal: Kaliningrad
Sky Express	Athens
SkyUp	Seasonal charter: Hurghada, Sharm El Sheikh
Transavia	Paris–Orly; Seasonal: Lyon, Marseille
Turkish Airlines	Istanbul
Ural Airlines	Moscow–Domodedovo, Sochi, Yekaterinburg
Utair	Moscow–Vnukovo, Saint Petersburg, Surgut, Tyumen
Wizz Air	Bari, Basel/Mulhouse (begins 18 December 2026), Paris Beauvais, Bratislava, Bucharest–Otopeni, Budapest, Charleroi (begins 1 February 2027), Dortmund, Eindhoven, Hamburg, Larnaca, London–Luton, Memmingen, Milan–Malpensa, Naples, Paphos, Prague, Rhodes, Rome–Fiumicino, Varna (begins 6 June 2027), Valencia (begins 19 December 2026), Venice

=== Cargo ===
Airlines	Destinations
ASL Airlines Belgium	Liège
Hayways	Moscow-Vnukovo
Lufthansa Cargo	Frankfurt
Swiftair	Cologne/Bonn, Tbilisi

== Statistics ==
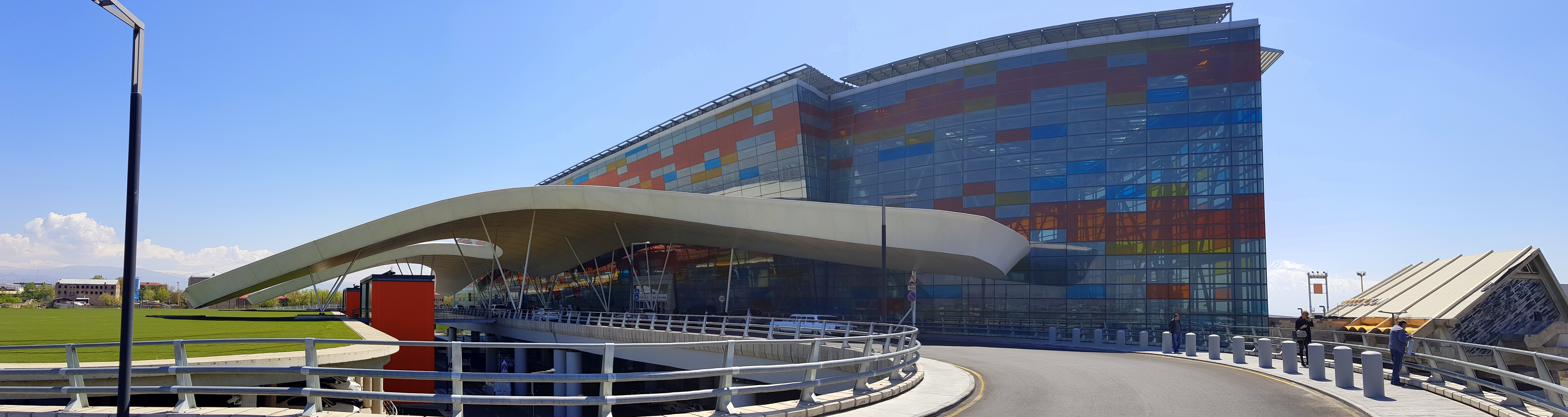
New terminal building

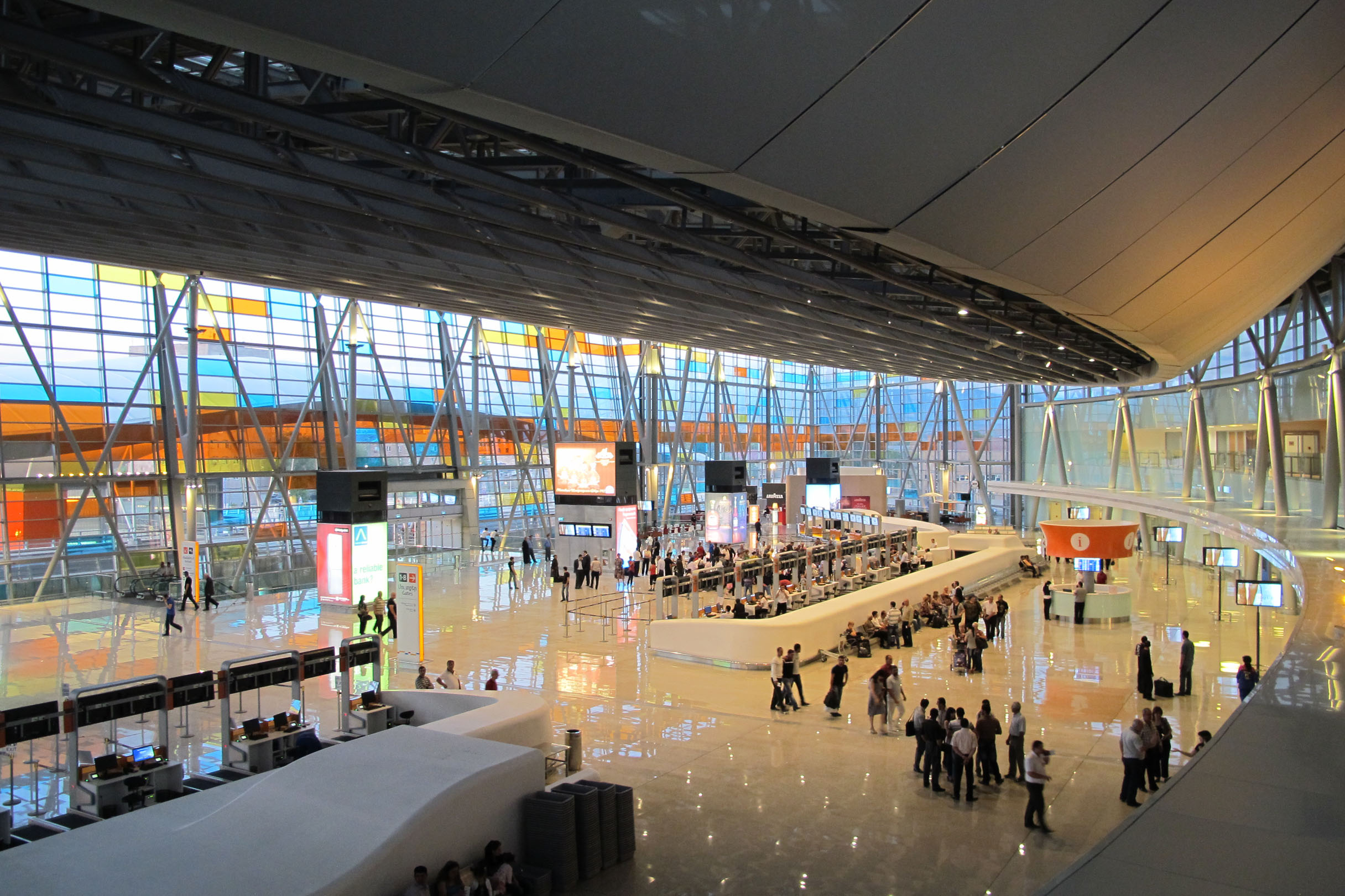
Check-in hall

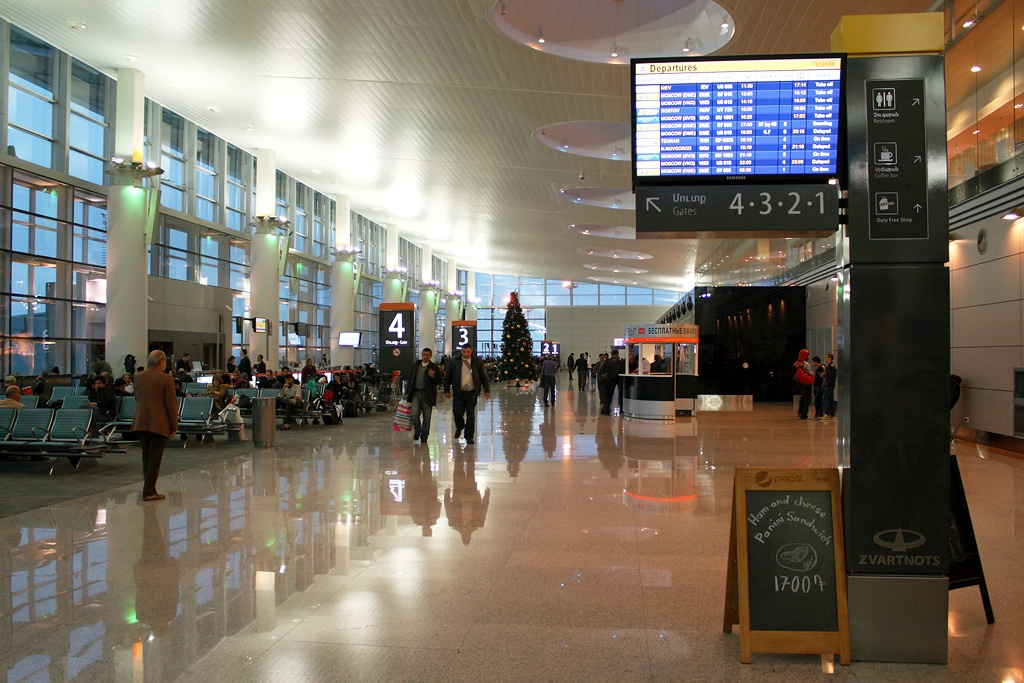
Departures hall and gates

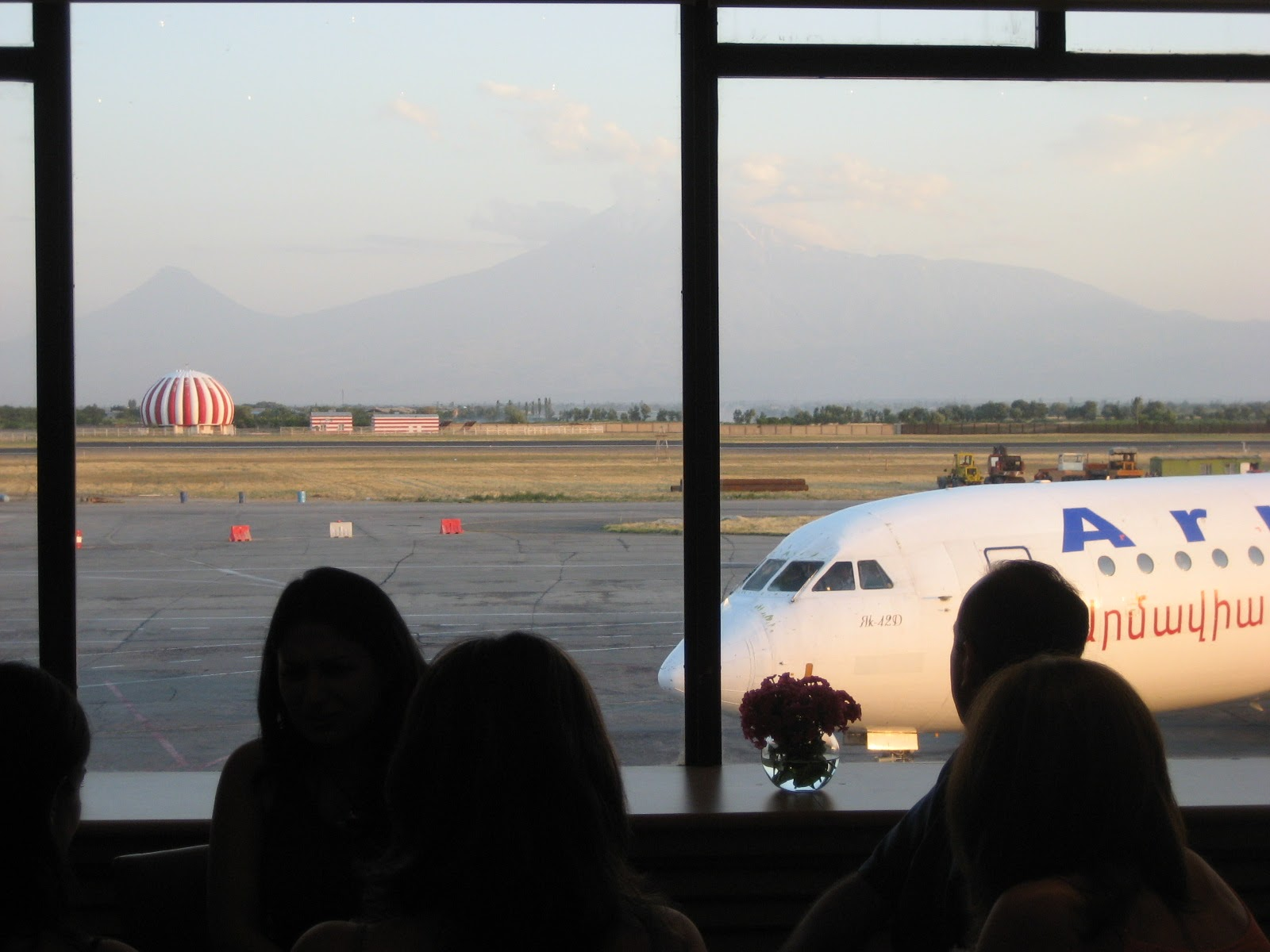
Mount Ararat from Zvartnots Airport

=== Annual statistics ===
2000s
Year	2005	2006	2007	2008	2009
Total passenger traffic	1,111,400	1,125,698	1,387,002	1,480,000	1,447,397
Departing passenger traffic	546,000	562,825	698,614	751,310	729,835
Arriving passenger traffic	547,400	562,873	688,388	628,690	717,562
Total freight (tons)	9,119	9,276	10,004	10,774	8,400
Exported freight (tons)	3,701	4,080	3,515	4,000	3,100
Imported freight (tons)	5,418	5,196	6,489	6,700	5,200
Aircraft movements (departure and landing)	6,897	6,746	7,953	8,624	8,699

2010s
Year	2010	2011	2012	2013	2014	2015	2016	2017	2018	2019
Total passenger traffic	1,612,016	1,600,891	1,691,815	1,691,710	2,045,058	1,879,667	2,105,540	2,448,250	2,690,727	3,048,859
Departing passenger traffic	816,866	807,953	845,700	830,000	1,019,765	944,373	1,048,153	1,218,340	1,318,344	1,473,019
Arriving passenger traffic	795,150	792,944	846,115	861,710	1,025,293	935,294	1,057,387	1,229,910	1,372,383	1,575,840
Total freight (tons)	8,800	10,014	12,251	10,361	10,345	10,123	18,269	22,325	18,069	19,511
Exported freight (tons)	3,300	4,741	6,687	6,109	6,450	6,607	13,784	16,984	12,010	12,755
Imported freight (tons)	5,500	5,273	5,564	4,252	3,895	3,516	4,485	5,341	6,059	6,756
Aircraft movements (departure and landing)	9,783	9,858	10,392	8,721	10,409	9,012	9,266	10,621	11,580	13,260

2020s
Year	2020	2021	2022	2023	2024	2025
Total passenger traffic	790,827	2,278,212	3,649,764	5,330,308	5,248,348	5,615,789
Departing passenger traffic	388,685	1,155,765	1,809,565	2,655,515	2,629,512	2,805,078
Arriving passenger traffic	402,142	1,122,447	1,840,199	2,674,793	2,618,836	2,810,711
Total freight (tons)	15,733	17,321 (Note: Including postal items)	23,340 (Note: Including postal items)	33,852 (Note: Including freight processed at Shirak Airport)	42,235	42,679
Exported freight (tons)	10,405	8,803	N/A	17,568 (Note: Including freight exported from Shirak Airport)	N/A	N/A
Imported freight (tons)	5,328	8,518	N/A	16,284 (Note: Including freight imported at Shirak Airport)	N/A	N/A
Aircraft movements (departure and landing)	4,963	10,106	17,345	43,485	39,168	41,999

Most frequent routes as of February 2026
Rank	City	Flights per week
1	Moscow (SVO)	34
2	Moscow (VKO)	31
3	Larnaca	17
4	Krasnodar	17
5	Sochi	16
6	Dubai	14
7	Mineralnye Vody	12
8	Rome	9
9	Frankfurt	9
10	Doha	7

== Ground transportation ==
=== Bus routes and subway service ===
In 2017, a new express bus service began operation, with regular round-trips between Zvartnots Airport and downtown Yerevan. The number 201 bus leaves the airport every half hour between 7 am and 11 pm, and every hour between 12 am and 6 am. The travel time is approximately 30 minutes, depending on traffic. Operated by Elitebus, a one-way fare costs 300 AMD. The bus terminus is on Amiryan Street, but the bus also makes stops along Mashtots Avenue, at the Yeritasardakan station (where passengers can connect to the Yerevan Metro system), and at the Republic Square.

=== Automobile ===
The airport is accessed from the M5 highway, which connects Yerevan with the west of the country and other major highways. By car, the distance from Zvartnots Airport to the centre of Yerevan is 12 kilometers, taking approximately 20 minutes to get to.

At Zvartnots Airport, cars from rental companies are available. The airport offers various official parking options, from premium to low cost. In addition, alternative parking options are within the reach of the airport.

=== Taxi service ===
In 2019, Zvartnots Airport partnered with Yandex Taxi to provide passengers with taxi services from the airport.

== Incidents ==
On 14 February 2008, Belavia Flight 1834, operated by a Bombardier CRJ100ER, stalled and crashed on takeoff at Zvartnots. The aircraft flipped over and burst into flames. There were no fatalities amongst the 21 occupants, but seven people were injured.

== See also ==
- Transport in Armenia
- List of the busiest airports in Armenia
- List of the busiest airports in the former USSR
- List of the busiest airports in Europe
