= List of the busiest airports in Armenia =

Air transportation in Armenia is the most convenient and comfortable means of getting into the country. There are large international airports that accept both external and domestic flights throughout the Republic. As of 2020, 11 airports operate in Armenia; however, only Yerevan's Zvartnots International Airport and Gyumri's Shirak Airport are in use for commercial aviation. Three airports, Syunik Airport, Stepanavan Airport and Goris Airport, are under reconstruction in Armenia. Once completed they will be used for commercial and civil aviation. Statistics show that the number of passengers arriving in the country by air transportation increases yearly.

== Armenia's airports by passenger traffic in 2020 (Feb 29) ==
Rank	Airport	Location	Total passengers	Annual change	Rank change
1	Zvartnots International Airport	Yerevan	409,394	▲14.58%	Steady
2	Shirak Airport	Gyumri	21,324	▼0.53%	Steady

== Armenia's airports by passenger traffic in 2019 ==
Rank	Airport	Location	Total passengers	Annual change	Rank change
1	Zvartnots International Airport	Yerevan	3,048,859	▲13.30%	Steady
2	Shirak Airport	Gyumri	147,536	▼11.09%	Steady

== Armenia's airports by passenger traffic in 2018 ==
Rank	Airport	Location	Total passengers	Annual change	Rank change
1	Zvartnots International Airport	Yerevan	2,690,727	▲9.90%	Steady
2	Shirak Airport	Gyumri	165,946	▲57.00%	Steady

== Armenia's airports by passenger traffic in 2017 ==
Rank	Airport	Location	Total passengers	Annual change	Rank change
1	Zvartnots International Airport	Yerevan	2,448,250	▲16.28%	Steady
2	Shirak Airport	Gyumri	105,664	▲750.69%	Steady

== Armenia's airports by passenger traffic in 2016 ==
Rank	Airport	Location	Total passengers	Annual change	Rank change
1	Zvartnots International Airport	Yerevan	2,105,540	▲21.95%	Steady
2	Shirak Airport	Gyumri	12,421	▼68.42%	Steady

== See also ==
- Transport in Armenia
- List of airports in Armenia
- List of the busiest airports in the former USSR
