= Transport in Armenia =

Transportation networks and infrastructure in Armenia

Transport in Armenia includes rail, road, air, and urban transit systems that support domestic mobility and international connections. As a landlocked country in the South Caucasus, Armenia relies heavily on road and air transport, with railways and pipelines playing a supporting role. Much of the country's transport infrastructure is centered on the capital, Yerevan, which serves as the main hub for rail, metro, bus, and air services.

== Railways ==
=== Total ===
850 km (530 mi) in common carrier service; does not include industrial lines

=== Broad gauge ===
850 km of 1,520 mm (4 ft 11 27/32 in) gauge (850 km electrified) (1995) There is no service south of Yerevan.

City with metro system: Yerevan

=== International links ===
- Azerbaijan - closed - same gauge
- (Georgia (country)) Georgia - yes - same gauge
- Iran - via Azerbaijan - closed - break of gauge - 1,520 mm (4 ft 11 27/32 in)/1,435 mm (4 ft 8 1/2 in)
- Turkey - closed - break of gauge -1,520 mm (4 ft 11 27/32 in)/1,435 mm (4 ft 8 1/2 in)

Most of the cross-border lines are currently closed due to political problems. However, there are daily inbound and outbound trains connecting Tbilisi and Yerevan. Departing from Yerevan railway station trains connect to both Tbilisi and Batumi. From neighboring Georgia, trains depart to Yerevan from Tbilisi railway station. Within Armenia, new electric trains connect passengers from Yerevan to Armenia's second-largest city of Gyumri. The new trains run four times a day and the journey takes approximately two hours.

There is also discussion to establish a rail link between Yerevan and Tehran. Armenia is pursuing funding from the Asian Development Bank to launch the construction of this infrastructure project. The completion of the project could establish a major commodities transit corridor and would serve as the shortest transportation route between Europe and the Persian Gulf. In June 2019, Iranian president Hassan Rouhani backed this project and stated that “we want the Persian Gulf and the Gulf of Oman to be connected to the Black Sea, and one of the ways to make this happen is through Iran, Armenia and Georgia.”

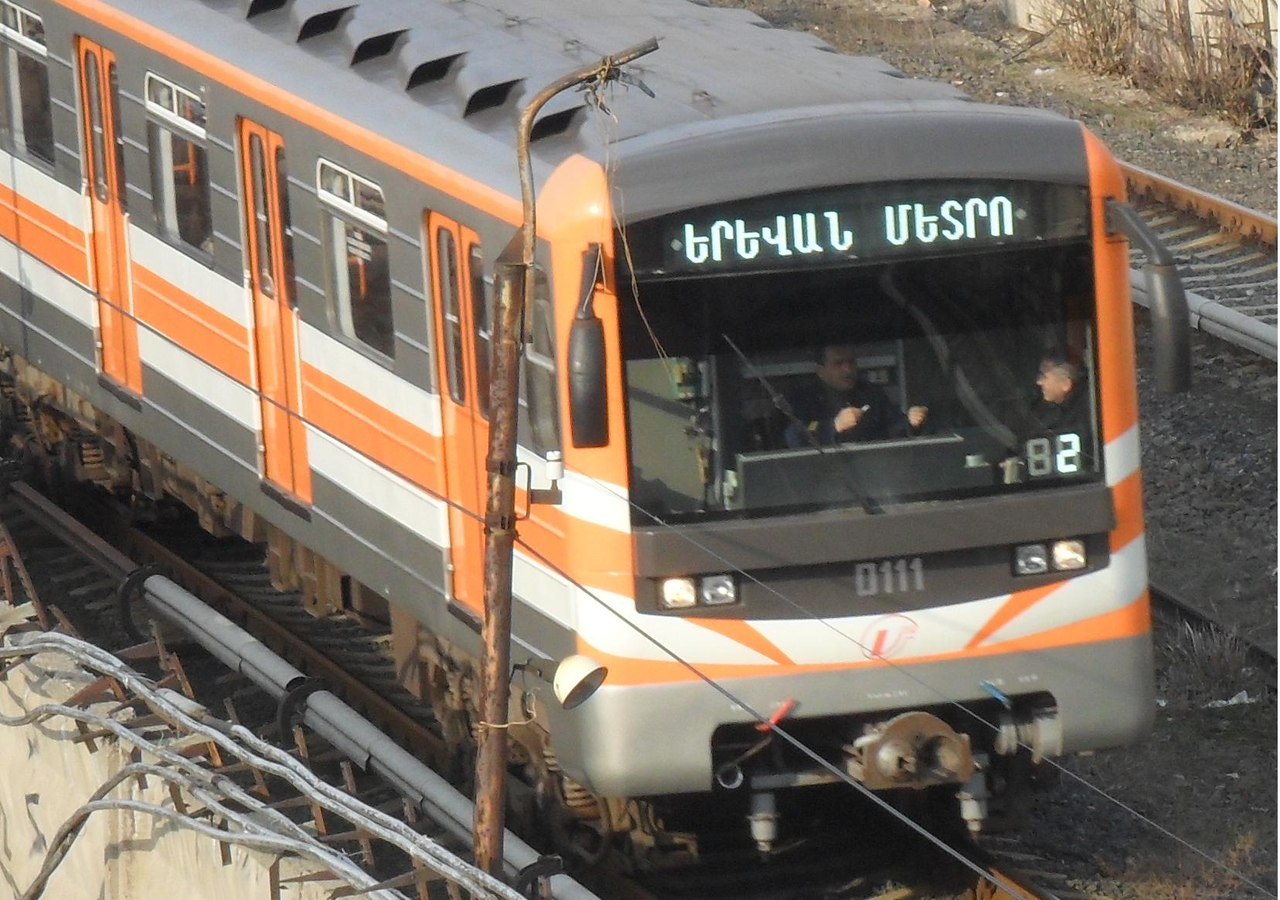
Yerevan Metro train

=== Metros ===
The capital city of Armenia, Yerevan, is serviced by the Yerevan Metro. The system was launched in 1981, and like most former Soviet Metros, its stations are very deep (20–70 meters underground) and intricately decorated with national motifs. The metro runs on a 13.4 kilometers (8.3 mi) line and currently serves 10 active stations. Trains run every five minutes from 6:30 a.m. until 11 p.m. local AMT time. As of 2017, the annual ridership of the metro is 16.2 million passengers. Free Wi-Fi is available at all stations and some trains.

=== Trams ===
Yerevan tram (Armenian: Երևանի տրամվայ) was a tram system previously operating in Yerevan, the capital of Armenia. It was opened on 29 September 1906 in the form of a city wagonway. In the second half of the 20th century, the tram system had up to 12 routes, which were served by 3 depots. Trams were operated until 21 January 2004.

==== History ====
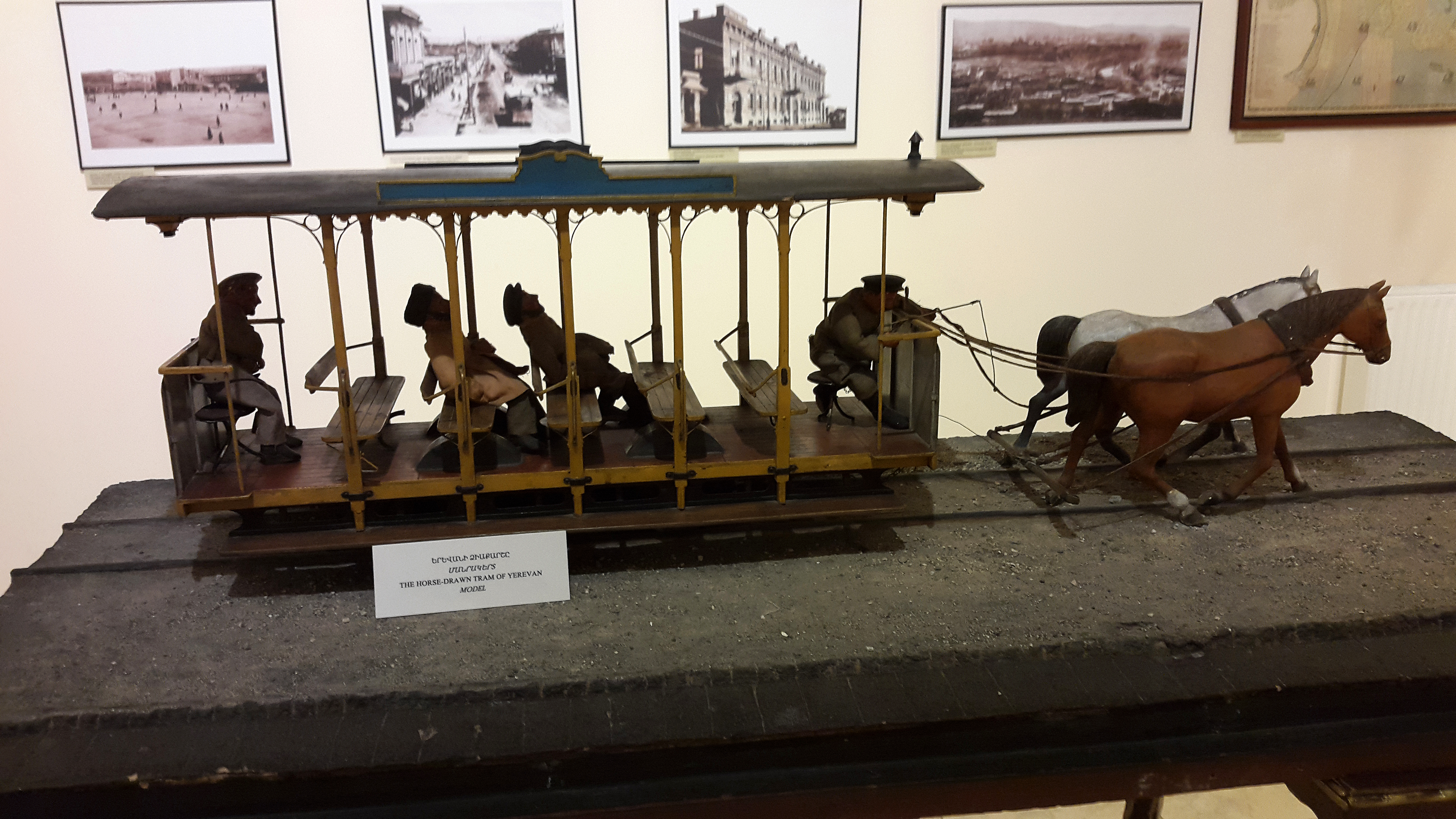
Model of a horseway tram in Yerevan

The only city in Armenia where a tram ever existed was Yerevan. On 29 September 1906, the Yerevan horse wagonway was opened. This type of narrow-gauge wagonway existed until August 1918, when the tram was destroyed during World War I.

On 12 January 1933, a wide-gauge electric tram was launched. The number of tram cars increased by 25% on average every five years, in 1933 it was 16, then in 1945 there were 77 cars, and in 1965 - 222 cars. Two types of trams were used, the 71-605 and the RVZ-6M2, both were Soviet made. Since the cost of the tram was 2.4% higher than that of buses, as well as due to expensive electricity and problems arising when the tram crossed the Great Bridge of Hrazdan in Yerevan, route #7 (Erebuni - Zeytun) was closed on 20 June 2003.

Most of the tracks have been removed and the trams have been turned into scrap. The tram depot is used by various private enterprises, and the substation currently serves the Yerevan trolleybus.

== Buses ==
=== International connections ===
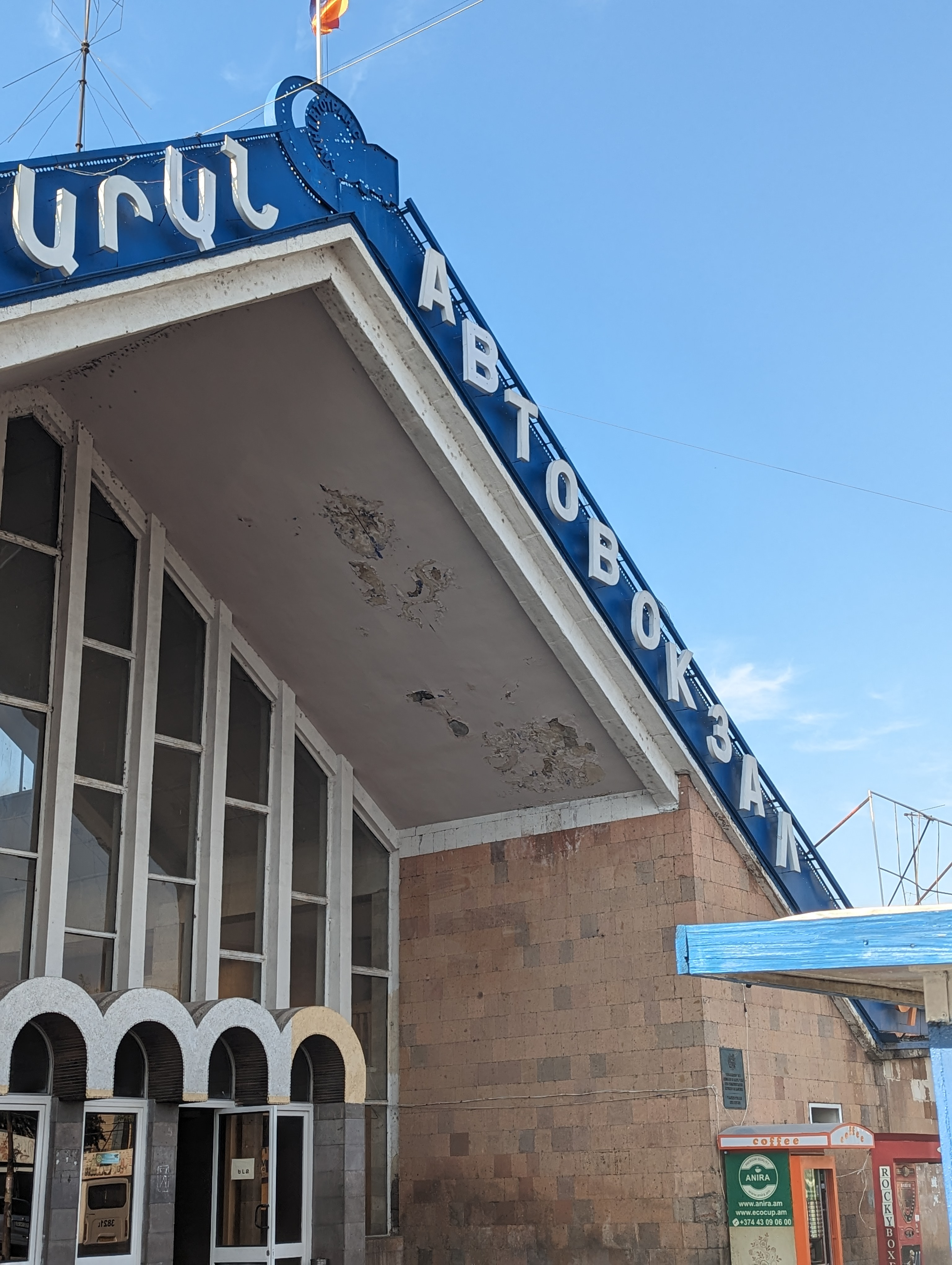
Yerevan Central Bus Station

Land borders are open with both Georgia and Iran. Yerevan Central Bus Station, also known as Kilikia Bus Station, is the main bus terminal in Yerevan with buses connecting to both internal and international destinations. There are daily bus connections between Yerevan and Tbilisi and Yerevan and Tehran. Approximately three times daily, buses depart from Yerevan Central Bus Station to Stepanakert, the capital of the partially recognized state of Artsakh. There are also scheduled bus routes which connect Yerevan with Kyiv, Moscow, Saint Petersburg as well as several other cities across Russia. It is also possible to connect to Chișinău Moldova, Minsk Belarus and other cities in Eastern Europe from Yerevan through connecting bus routes via Georgia and Ukraine. In addition, there is a once a week bus service to Istanbul via Georgia. In June 2019, a new bus route from Baghdad to Yerevan via Iran began.

=== Local connections ===
The Armenian bus network connects all major cities, towns, and villages throughout the country. In larger cities and towns such as Yerevan, Gyumri, Vanadzor and Armavir, bus stations are equipped with a waiting room and a ticket office, in other towns bus stations may not have shelters. Most of the routes are operated by GAZelle minivans with a capacity of 15 passengers, some routes are operated by soviet bus producer LiAZ (Russia). Yerevan itself has a large integrated bus network, with a newly acquired bus fleet, passengers are able to connect from one end of the city to the other. Wi-Fi is available on most city buses. Despite this, buses often have difficulty meeting the demand for capacity, mainly in Yerevan, where vehicles are typically overcrowded. There are no night services between 11 p.m. and 6 a.m. There is no ticket system in the country, passengers pay in cash to drivers. Passengers on the national bus network pay before boarding, passengers on the Yerevan bus network pay after the ride, while leaving the vehicle. Timetables and fares are published on Transport for Armenia.

From Yeritasardakan metro station in downtown Yerevan, travelers can take the 201 airport shuttle, which goes directly to Zvartnots International Airport, which takes approximately 20 minutes from the city center.

== Roadways ==
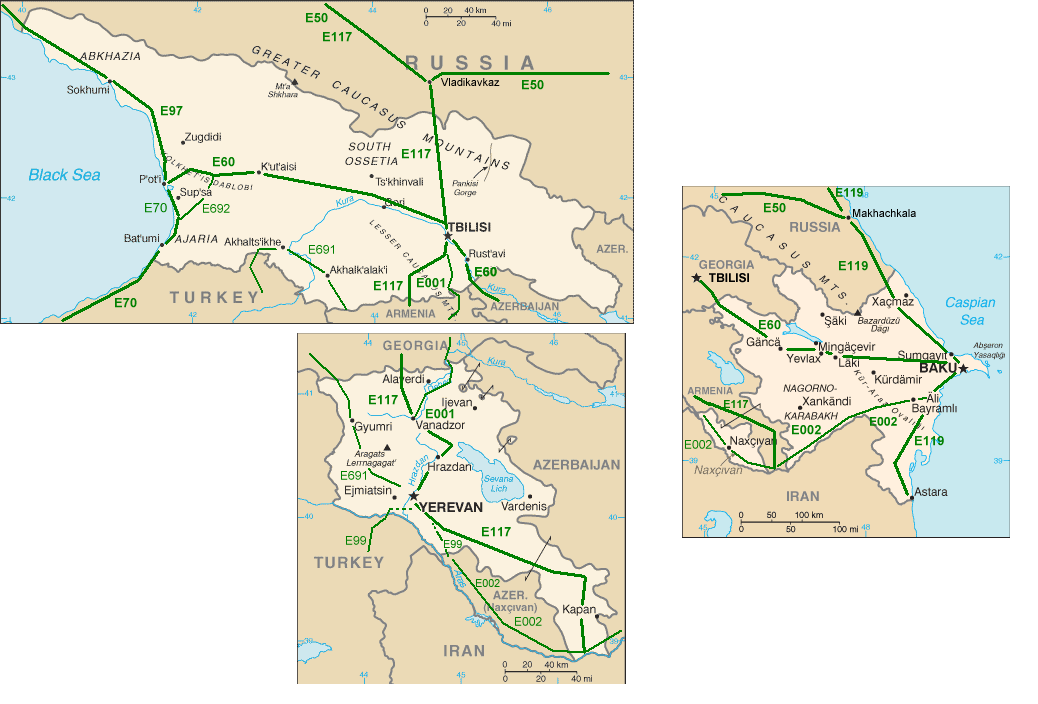
The E-road network in Georgia, Armenia, Azerbaijan. However, the border between Armenia and Azerbaijan is closed due to strained relations between Armenia and Azerbaijan.

Since independence, Armenia has been developing its internal highway network. The "North-South Road Corridor Investment Program" is a major infrastructure project which aims at connecting the southern border of Armenia with its northern by means of a 556 km-long Meghri-Yerevan-Bavra highway. It is a major US$1.5 billion infrastructure project funded by the Asian Development Bank, European Investment Bank and the Eurasian Development Bank. When completed, the highway will provide access to European countries via the Black Sea. It could also eventually interconnect the Black Sea ports of Georgia with the major ports of Iran, thus positioning Armenia in a strategic transport corridor between Europe and Asia. Armenia is pursuing further loans from China as part of the Belt and Road Initiative to complete the north–south highway.

Armenia connects to European road networks via the International E-road network through various routes such as; European route E117, European route E691, European route E001 and European route E60. Armenia also connects to the Asian Highway Network through routes AH81, AH82 and AH83.

The number of insured registered cars in Armenia has grown from 390,457 in 2011 to 457,878 in 2015.

=== Total ===
8,800 km
World Ranking: 112

=== Paved ===
8,800 km (including 1,561 km of expressways)

=== Unpaved ===
0 km (2006 est.)

== Pipelines ==
Natural gas 3,838 km (2017)

== Ports and harbors ==
Cargo shipments to landlocked Armenia are routed through ports in Georgia and Turkey.

== Airports ==
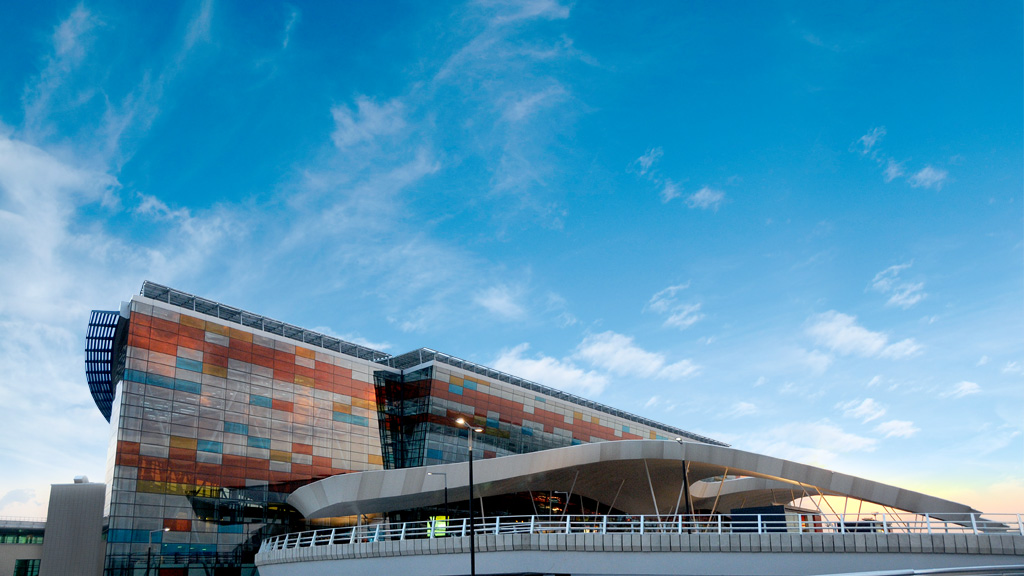
Zvartnots International Airport

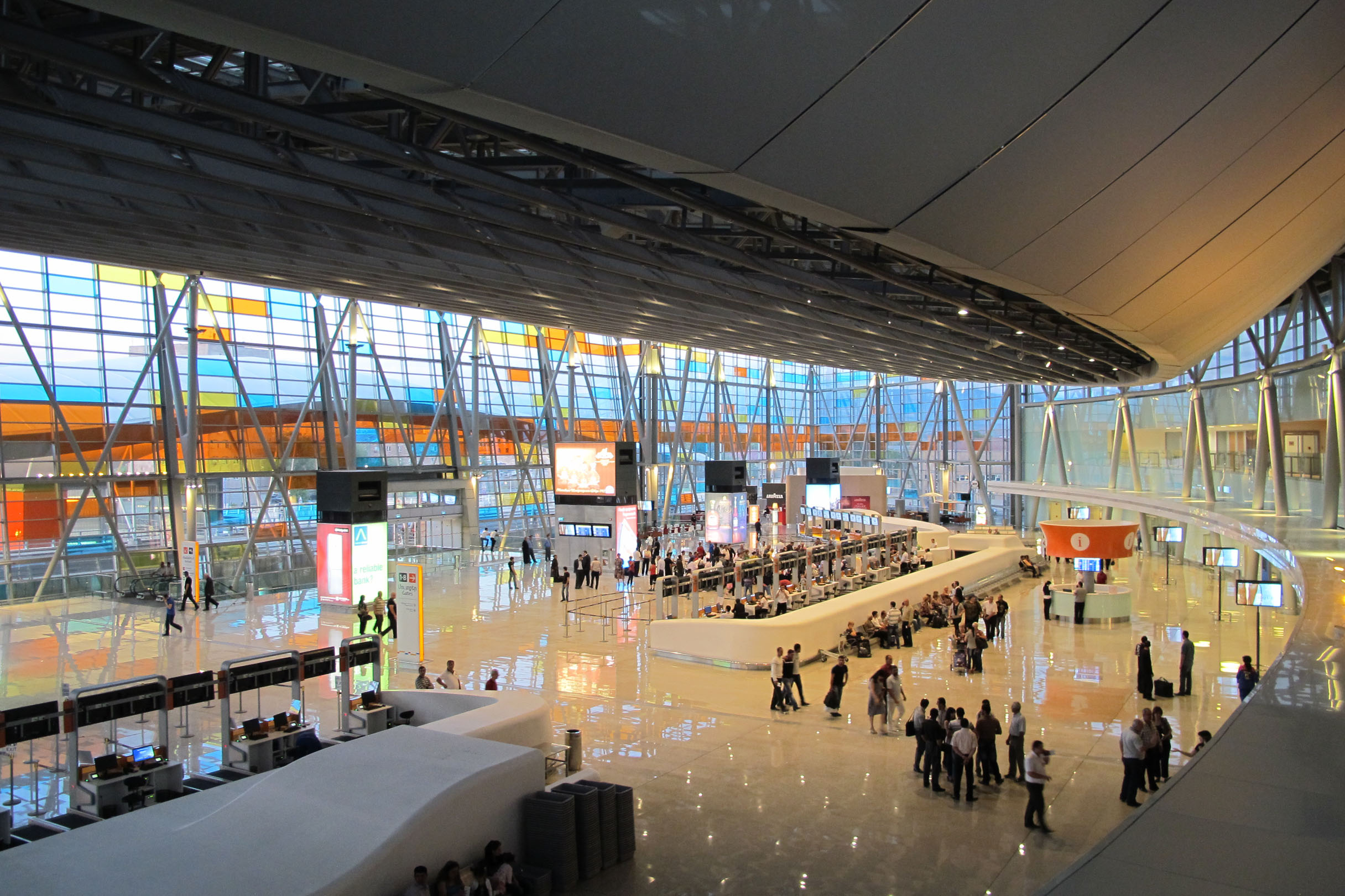
Zvartnots International Airport main concourse.

Air transportation in Armenia is the most convenient and comfortable means of getting into the country. There are large international airports that accept both external and domestic flights throughout the Republic. As of 2020, 11 airports operate in Armenia. However, only Yerevan's Zvartnots International Airport and Gyumri's Shirak Airport are in use for commercial aviation. There are three additional civil airports currently under reconstruction in Armenia, including Syunik Airport, Stepanavan Airport, and Goris Airport. The leading Armenian airlines in operation are Armenia Aircompany and Armenia Airways.

There are plenty of air connections between Yerevan and other regional cities, including Athens, Barcelona, Beirut, Berlin, Bucharest, Brussels, Damascus, Doha, Dubai, Istanbul, Kyiv, Kuwait City, London, Milan, Minsk, Moscow, Paris, Prague, Riga, Rome, Tehran, Tel-Aviv, Tbilisi, Vienna, Venice, and Warsaw, as well as daily connections to most major cities within the CIS region. Statistics show that the number of tourists arriving in the country by air transportation increases yearly. In 2018, passenger flow at the two main airports of Armenia reached a record high of 2,856,673 million people. In December 2019, yearly passenger flow exceeded 3,000,000 million people for the first time in Armenia's history.

In November 2019, the creation of a Free Route Airspace (FRA) between Armenia and Georgia was announced. The process has been carried out through the joint efforts of the General Department of Civil Aviation of Armenia, the Georgian Civil Aviation Administration and Eurocontrol. The Free Route Airspace between the two South Caucasus countries will increase flights to around 40,000 annually.

Country comparison to the world: 153

=== Airports - with paved runways ===
Total: 10

Over 3,047 m (9,900 feet): 2
1,524 to 2,437 m (7,920 feet): 2
914 to 1,523 m (4,950 feet): 4
Under 914 m: 2 (as of 2008)

=== Airports - with unpaved runways ===
Total: 1

1,524 to 2,437 m: 0
914 to 1,523 m: 1
under 914 m: 0 (as of 2008)

== Heliports ==
Armenia maintains a number of both military and civilian heliports. The main military heliport is located on the premises of Erebuni Airport in Yerevan. Meanwhile, the company Armenian Helicopters, based at Zvartnots Airport in Yerevan, offers charter flights within Armenia and to certain neighboring countries, including Georgia, Russia, and Turkey. Helicopter services are delivered with the US-made Robinson R66 and the European AIRBUS EC130T2 choppers. Flights can be carried out as scheduled or on individual routes.

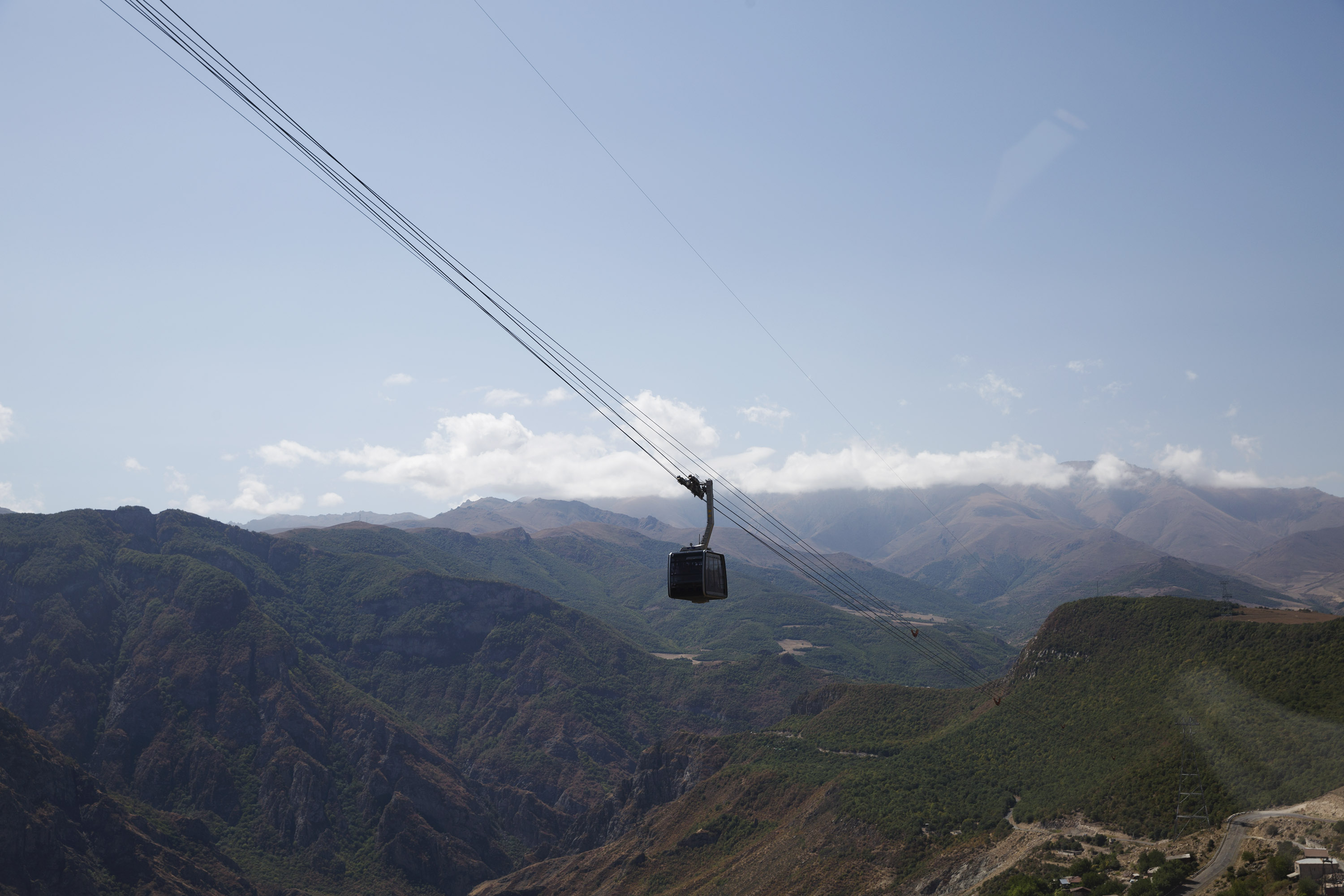
Wings of Tatev aerial tramway

== Aerial tramways ==
The Wings of Tatev is currently the world's longest reversible aerial tramway which holds the record for longest non-stop double-track cable car and is located in the town of Halidzor.

In October 2019, it was announced that investors were interested in creating an aerial tramway in the capital, Yerevan. There was previously a cable car in Yerevan that went from the top of Nalbandyan Street to Nork Marash, which was closed after a fatal accident. Alaverdi also had a working cable car from the area by the post office in the center of Alaverdi, taking passengers to the top of the Debed Canyon cliffs, to the neighborhood of Sarahart which closed in 2016 due to financial difficulties.

== International transport agreements ==
Armenia cooperates in various international transport-related organizations and agreements, including the following:

- Eurocontrol
- European Aviation Safety Agency (Pan-European Partner)
- European Civil Aviation Conference
- European Common Aviation Area
- International Civil Aviation Organization
- International Road Transport Union
- International Transport Forum
- International Union of Railways (Associate member)
- Montreal Convention
- TIR Convention
- TRACECA
- Trans-European Transport Networks

== See also ==
- Civil Aviation Committee of Armenia
- Economy of Armenia
- Ministry of Transport and Communication (Armenia)
- Tourism in Armenia
- Transport in Europe
- Transport in Georgia (country)
- Transport in the Republic of Artsakh
