= Telephone numbers in Armenia =

- Country: Armenia
- Continent: Europe
- Numbering plan type: closed
- Country code: +374
- International access: 00
- Long-distance: 0

Telephone numbers in Republic of Artsakh
- Artsakh show in (dark green) territory claimed show in (light green)
- Country: Republic of Artsakh
- Continent: Europe
- Format: +374 XX XXXXX
- Country code: +374 47 / +374 97

The following telephone numbers in Armenia are destination codes for international calls terminating in Armenia as well as the procedures for dialing internationally from within Armenia.

== Dialling plan ==
The dialling plan is as below:

=== Calling Armenia from abroad ===
From abroad to Yerevan, regions, mobile network, Artsakh fixed telephone network and Artsakh mobile network:

  + 374 + Destination Code + Subscriber Number           (to Yerevan, regions)
  + 374 + Mobile Network Code + Mobile Subscriber Number (to mobile network)
  + 374 + 47 + Subscriber Number                         (to Artsakh fixed telephone network)
  + 374 + 97 + Subscriber Number                         (to Artsakh mobile network)

=== Calling from Armenia ===
From Yerevan, regions, mobile network and Artsakh to abroad:

  00 + Country Code + Destination Code + Subscriber Number

Calls to North America from anywhere in Armenia receive a substantial discount if preceded by a special code specific to each Armenian phone company.

For example, if one makes a call from a Vivacell-MTS phone to North America and dials 77 first, one is charged 14 AMD per minute. It is the same deal for callers from a Beeline (whether a mobile or landline) if a call is preceded by *88*.

Thus, from a Vivacell phone one must dial; 77 + 00 + Country Code (1 for North America) + Destination Code + Subscriber Number

From a beeline phone (landline or cell) one must dial: *88* + 00 + Country Code (1 for North America) + Destination Code + Subscriber Number

=== Calling within Armenia and Artsakh ===
  0 + Destination Code + Subscriber Number

=== Calling Artsakh from Armenia ===
From Yerevan, regions and mobile network to Artsakh fixed telephone network and Artsakh mobile network:

  0 + 47 + Subscriber Number                      (to Artsakh fixed telephone network)
  0 + 97 + Subscriber Number                      (to Artsakh mobile network)

=== Example ===
An example for calling telephones in Yerevan, Armenia is as follows:

               Subscriber Number  (within Yerevan)
      0 + 10 + Subscriber Number  (within Armenia and Artsakh)
  + 374 + 10 + Subscriber Number  (outside Armenia and Artsakh)

== Destination codes ==
=== All ===
Dialling code	Location
10, 11, 12, 15	Yerevan
222	Abovyan
223	Hrazdan
223	Tsaghkadzor
224	Eghvard
224	Nor Geghi
224	Nor Hachn
226	Charentsavan
231	Vagharshapat
231	Zvartnots
232	Ashtarak
233	Baghramyan
234	Vedi
235	Artashat
236	Masis
237	Armavir
237	Hoktember
237	Metsamor
238	Ararat
242	Maralik
244	Artik
244	Pemzashen
245	Ashotsk
246	Amasia
252	Aparan
253	Alaverdi
254	Tashir
255	Spitak
256	Stepanavan
261	Sevan
262	Martuni
263	Ijevan
264	Gavar
264	Sarukhan
265	Chambarak
266	Koghb
266	Noyemberian
267	Berd
269	Vardenis
281	Eghegnadzor
282	Vayk
284	Goris
284	Verishen
285	Kajaran
285	Kapan
286	Agarak
287	Jermuk
312	Gyumri
322	Vanadzor
471	Stepanakert
474	Martakert
475	Hadrut
476	Askeran
477	Shushi
478	Martuni

=== By regions ===
==== Aragatsotn ====
- Aparan: 252
- Ashtarak: 232
- Talin: 249 0
- Tsaghkahovit: 257 0

==== Ararat ====
- Ararat: 238
- Artashat: 235
- Masis: 236
- Vedi: 234

==== Armavir ====
- Armavir: 237
- Baghramyan: 233
- Dalarik: 233 76
- Vagharshapat: 231
- Sardarapat: 237
- Metsamor: 237
- Myasnikyan: 233 74
- Karakert: 233 75
- Zvartnots: 231
- Baghramian: 231 90
- Vache: 231 91
- Norakert: 231 95
- Jrarat: 231 98
- Khoronk: 231 99

==== Gegharkunik ====
- Chambarak: 265
- Gavar: 264
- Martuni: 262
- Sarukhan: 264
- Sevan: 261
- Vardenis: 269
- Khachik: 281 51
- Arpi: 281 91
- Aghavnadzor: 281 93
- Areni: 281 94
- Malishka: 281 95
- Yelpin: 281 97
- Rind: 281 98
- Shatin: 281 99

==== Kotayk ====
- Abovyan: 222
- Ptghni: 222 96
- Hrazdan: 223
- Meghradzor: 223 93
- Pyunik: 223 94
- Alapars: 226 75
- Solak: 223 97
- Bjni: 223 98
- Tsaghkadzor: 223
- Charentsavan: 226
- Eghvard: 224
- Nor Hachn: 224
- Nor Geghi: 224
- Zovuni: 224 52
- Proshyan: 224 53
- Argel: 224 54
- Mayakovski: 222 90
- Balahovit: 222 91
- Kamaris: 222 91
- Aramus: 222 93
- Arzni: 222 94
- Geghashen: 222 97
- Kotayk: 222 99
- Lernanist: 223 91
- Arzakan: 226 72

==== Lori ====
- Alaverdi: 253
- Margahovit: 322 6
- Spitak: 255
- Stepanavan: 256
- Tashir: 254
- Vanadzor: 322
- Pambak: 322 93
- Lernapat: 322 94
- Yeghegnut: 322 95
- Dzoraget: 322 97
- Lermontovo: 322 98
- Vahagni: 322 99

==== Shirak ====
- Akhuryan: 243 00
- Amasia: 246
- Ani Kayaran: 242 97
- Arapi: 243 00
- Artik: 244
- Ashotsk: 245
- Gyumri: 312
- Kamo: 243 00
- Maralik: 242
- Pemzashen: 244
- Sarnakhbyur: 242 91
- Shirakavan: 242 93
- Artik: 244
- Panik: 244 92
- Arevshat: 244 95
- Mets Mantash: 244 96

==== Syunik ====
- Goris: 284
- Kajaran: 285
- Kapan: 285
- Khndzoresk: 284 94
- Meghri: 286 0
- Sisian: 283 0
- Verishen: 284
- Agarak: 286

==== Artsakh ====
The following codes are not active anymore.

- Stepanakert: 471
- Martakert: 474
- Hadrut: 475
- Askeran: 476
- Shushi: 477
- Kashatagh: 477 32
- Martuni: 478

==== Tavush ====
- Berd: 267
- Dilijan: 268 0
- Ijevan: 263
- Koghb: 266
- Noyemberian: 266

==== Vayots Dzor ====
- Eghegnadzor: 281
- Jermuk: 287
- Vayk: 282

==== Yerevan ====
- Yerevan: 10, 11, 12, 15

== Non-geographic network codes ==
Several new blocks of numbers have been assigned in 2010 and 2011 to several Armenian ITSPs for their respective non-geographic networks.

ITSP	Code
Viva-MTS	6061, 6067, 6068, 6069, 6076, 6077, 6078, 6079, 6080, 6081
Arminco	6027, 6062, 6066
BioNet	6029
Orange	6065
CrossNet LLC	6037, 6040, 6043, 6047, 6048,6049
Ucom LLC	6044, 6050, 6051, 6052, 6053, 6054
GNC LLC	6046
Web.am	6036
Griar Telecom	6045, 6056, 6057, 6058, 6059, 6060

== Mobile network codes ==
Mobile Operator	Code
Team	91, 99, 96, 43, 33, 97
Ucom	55, 95, 41, 44, 66, 50
Viva-MTS	93, 94, 77, 98

On 1 April 2014, mobile number portability was launched in Armenia, which means that subscribers of mobile operators can have any mobile network code by porting in from the host operator.

== Emergency numbers ==
General emergency	112 or 911
Fire brigade	101
Police	102
Ambulance	103
Gas services	104
