= Byureghavan =

City in Kotayk, Armenia

Byureghavan Բյուրեղավան
- Town
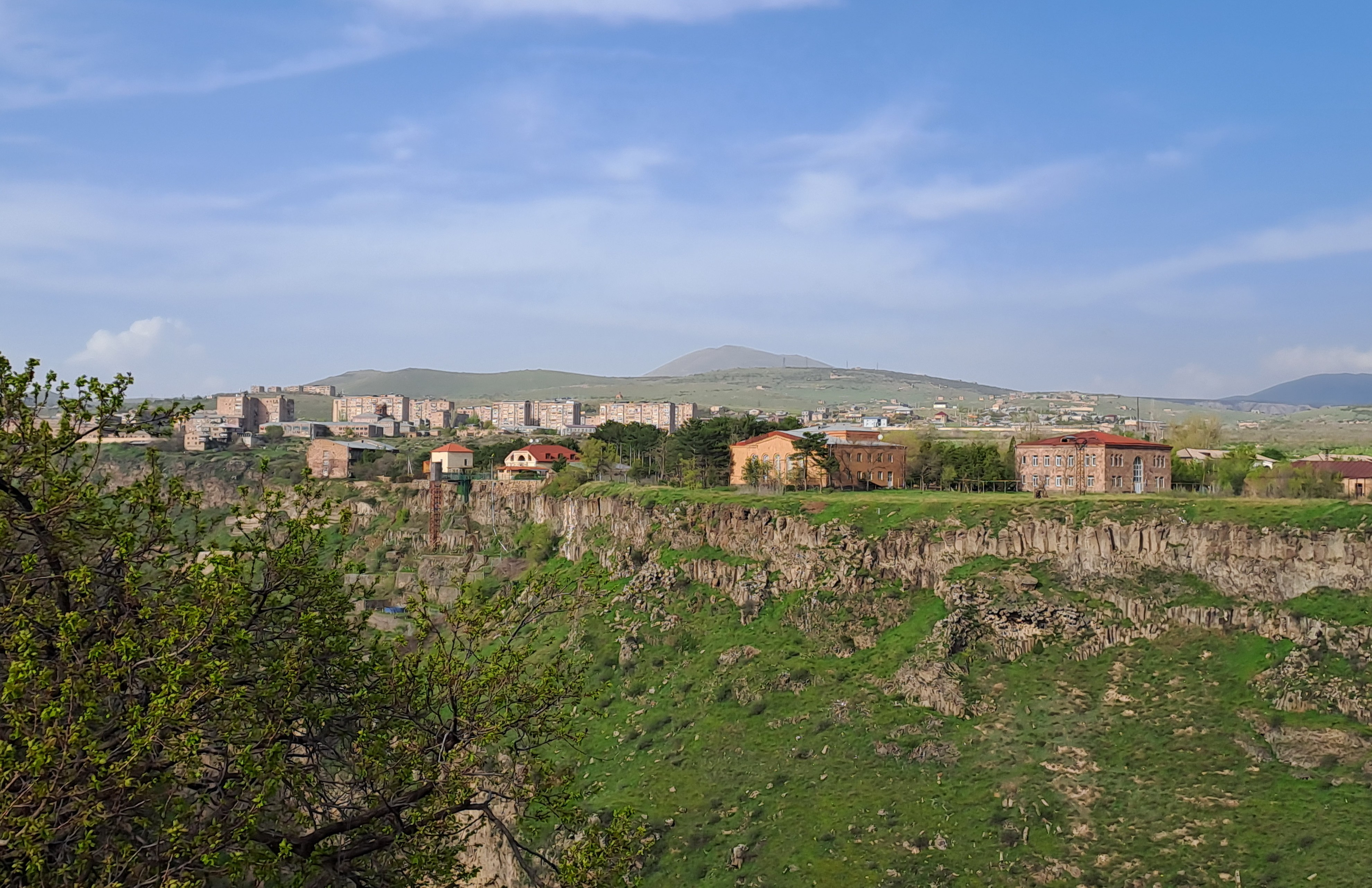
- Byureghavan seen from Nor Hachn

- Location within Armenia
- Coordinates: 40°18′53″N 44°35′37″E
- Country: Armenia
- Marz (Province): Kotayk
- Founded: 1945

Government
  - Mayor: Hakob Balasyan

Area
  - Total: 4 km^{2} (1.5 sq mi)
- Elevation: 1,300 m (4,300 ft)

Population (2022 census)
  - Total: 10,432
  - Density: 2,600/km^{2} (6,800/sq mi)
- Time zone: UTC+4 (UTC)
- Website: Official website

Byureghavan (Armenian: Բյուրեղավան), is a town and urban municipal community in the Kotayk Province of Armenia. It is located 16 kilometres (10 miles) northeast of Yerevan, and 25 kilometres (16 miles) south of the provincial center Hrazdan. It covers an area of 4 square kilometres (1.5 square miles). The rural communities of Nurnus and Arzni form the northern and southern borders of the town, respectively. As of the 2011 census, the population of the town is 9,513. As per the 2016 official estimate, Byureghavan has a population of around 8,300. As of the 2022 census, the town had a population of 10,432.

== Etymology ==
The name of Byureghavan is derived from the Armenian words of byuregh (Armenian: բյուրեղ) meaning crystal, and avan (Armenian: ավան) meaning settlement.

== History ==
The town was established in 1945 within the Abovyan raion (known as Kotayk raion until 1961) of Soviet Armenia. At the beginning, it was founded a small settlement known as Arzni banavan (literally meaning Arzni labours settlement) to accommodate the workers of the nearby bottle and glass manufacturing plant, which was placed in operation in 1947.

The settlement was further developed by the Soviet government during the 1970s with the establishment of many new industrial plants including the Armenian marble and granite processing plant opened in 1971, followed by the reinforced concrete manufacturing plant in 1973. In 1974, the community was given the status of urban-type settlement and renamed Byureghavan, after its well-known cut glass factory of the town. During the same year, the Arzni mineral water plant was relocated to Byureghavan. Many plants for building materials production were also opened in Byureghavan, including the prefab house-building plant.

After the independence of Armenia, Byureghavan received the status of a town with the territorial administration law of 1995.

== Geography ==
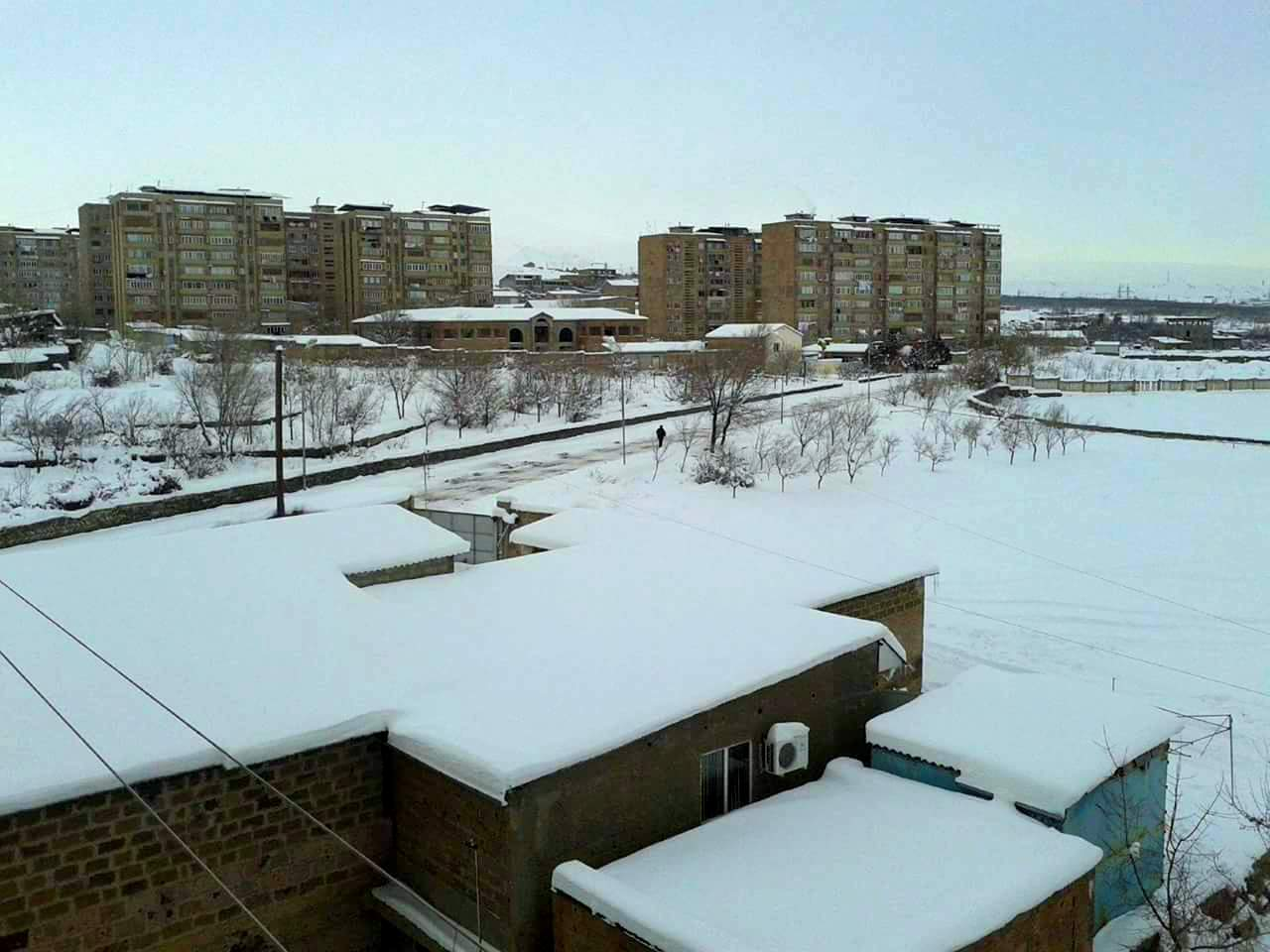
Byureghavan in January 2016

Byureghavan is built on Kotayk plateau on the left side of Hrazdan gorge, at a height of 1,300 metres (4,300 feet) above sea level. It is dominated by the Gutanasar volcano of Gegham mountains and Mount Hatis from the east. The town itself is surrounded by many other municipalities, including the village of Nurnus from the north, the village of Arzni from the south, the village of Nor Geghi from the west, and the town of Nor Hachn from the southwest.

During the ancient Kingdom of Armenia, the area of modern-day Byureghavan was part of the Kotayk Canton of Ayrarat province.

Generally, the climate of Byureghavan is characterized with cool summer and mildly cold winter.

== Demographics ==
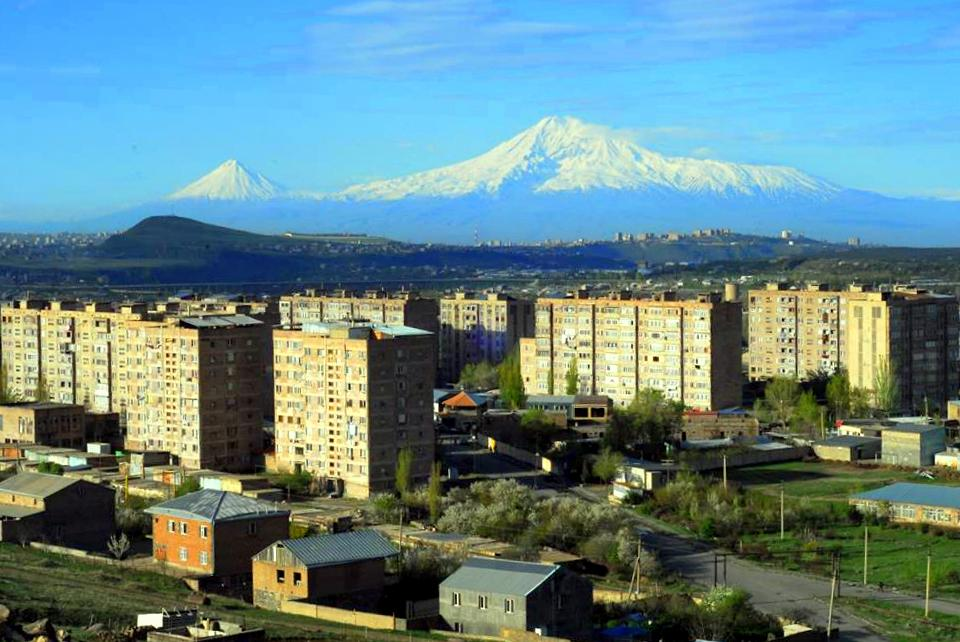
Byureghavan with mount Ararat in the background

The population of the town is mainly Armenian with minor Russian, Yazidi, Assyrian and Greek communities.

Historical population
| Year | Pop. | ±% p.a. |
|---|---|---|
| 1979 | 6,000 | — |
| 1989 | 10,373 | +5.63% |
| 1991 | 10,800 | +2.04% |
| 2001 | 8,152 | −2.77% |
| 2011 | 9,513 | +1.56% |
| 2022 | 10,432 | +0.84% |

== Culture ==
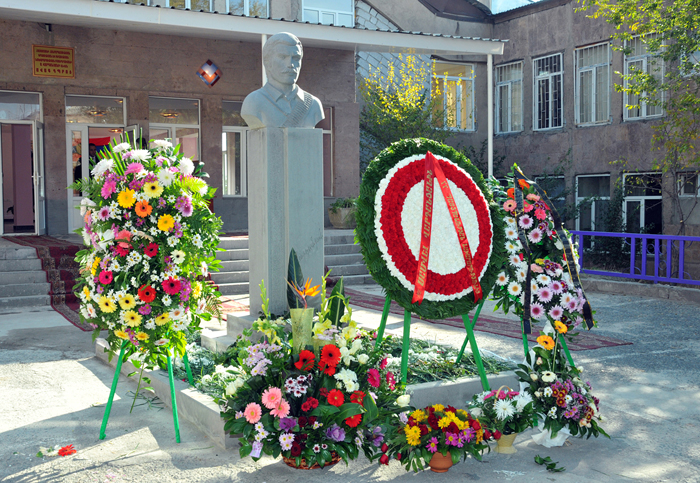
The statue of Samvel Vartanyan

Byureghavan has an art school operating since 1976, a public library since 1974, and a house of culture opened during the 1980s. The town has a children's art school and a dance ensemble known as Byuregh.

In November 2011, the statue of Karabakh War hero Samvel Vartanyan was erected in Byureghavan in the yard of the town's high school. The ceremony was attended by then-minister of defence Seyran Ohanyan.

== Transportation ==
Being located at the northeastern vicinity of Yerevan, Byureghavan is connected with capital city with buses and minibuses. The H-2 regional road connects Byureghavan with the M-4 Motorway that passes through the eastern vicinity of the town.

== Economy ==
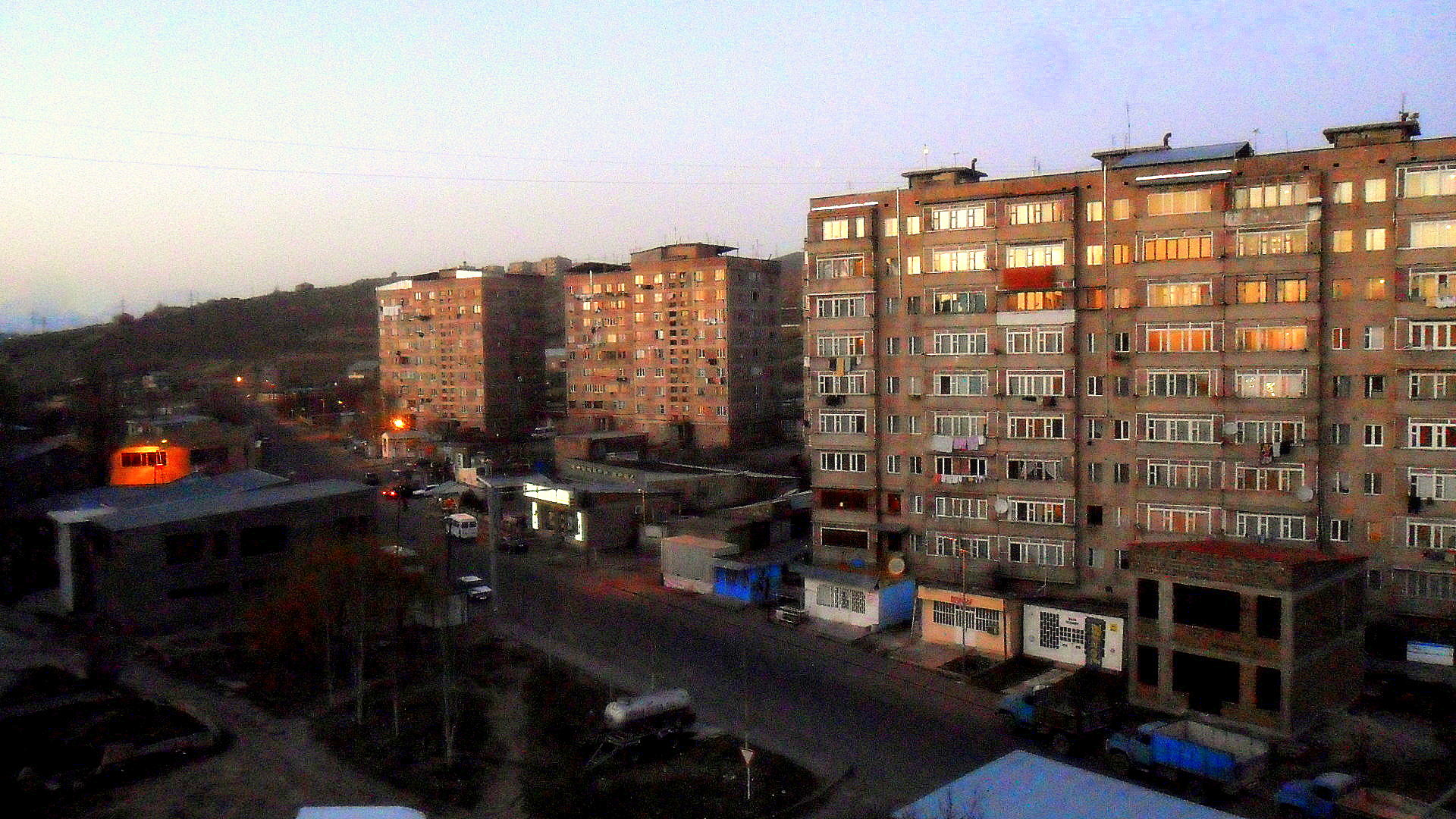
Zoravar Andranik street

During the 1970s, Byureghavan and the surrounding localities were turned into an active industrial hub within the Armenian Soviet Socialist Republic. However, much of the industrial capacity of the town was drastically dropped with the dissolution of the Soviet Union in 1991.

Many of the Soviet-era firms were privatized, including the glass containers manufacturing plant currently known as Glass World Company, the marble and granite processing plant currently known as Almaqar, and the reinforced concrete manufacturing plant currently known as Sunenergashin, while the Arzni mineral water plant was relocated to Yerevan. The town is also home to the Byuregh Alco wine-brandy-vodka factory founded in 1996, as well as many plants for the production of building materials.

== Education ==
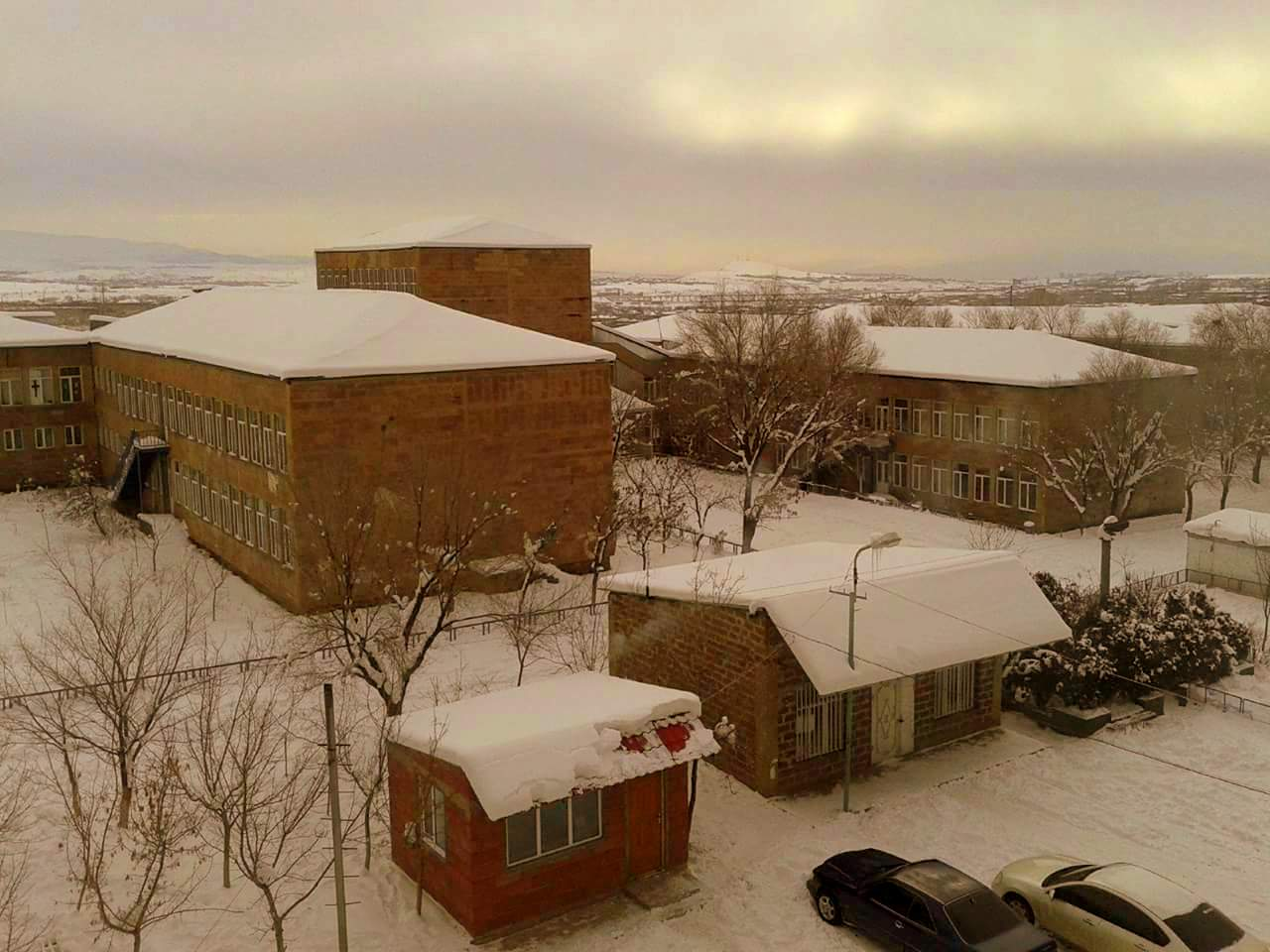
Samvel Vartanyan high school of Byureghavan

Byureghavan is home to a boarding school operating since 1958, an elementary school opened in 1966, as well as a high school opened in 1979. The high school is named after Samvel Vartanyan, a native to Byureghavan and a hero of the First Nagorno-Karabakh War

The Byureghavan State Vocational School is an intermediate college operating since 1974.

== Sport ==
The Byureghavan school of sport was opened in 1989 and currently has football, athletics, sambo, judo, wrestling and boxing teams. The town is also home to a sports and cultural centre opened in 2010.

Byureghavan has a municipal stadium with a capacity of 900 spectators. It is currently used by the young football teams of Kotayk Province.
