= Mantash, Armenia =

Mantash may refer to:

- Mets Mantash, Armenia
- Pokr Mantash, Armenia
