= Arapi =

Arapi may refer to:

- Arapi, Armenia, town in Armenia
- Maja e Arapit, mountain in Albania

== People ==
- Renato Arapi, Albanian footballer
- Florenc Arapi (footballer), Albanian footballer
