= Yeghegnut =

Yeghegnut or Yekheknut or Yekhegnut or Yegegnut or Eghegnut may refer to:

- Yeghegnut, Armavir, Armenia
- Yeghegnut, Lori, Armenia
- Yeghegnut, Shahumyan, Nagorno-Karabakh
