= Gadzhikara =

Gadzhikara may refer to:

- Aygeshat, Aragatsotn, Armenia, formerly called Gadzhikara
- Lerrnapat, Armenia, formerly called Gadzhikara
