= Armenak Khanperyants Military Aviation University =

Armenia air force university

Coordinates: 40°18′07″N 44°34′59″E

- Արմենակ Խանփերյանցի անվան ռազմական ավիացիոն համալսարան
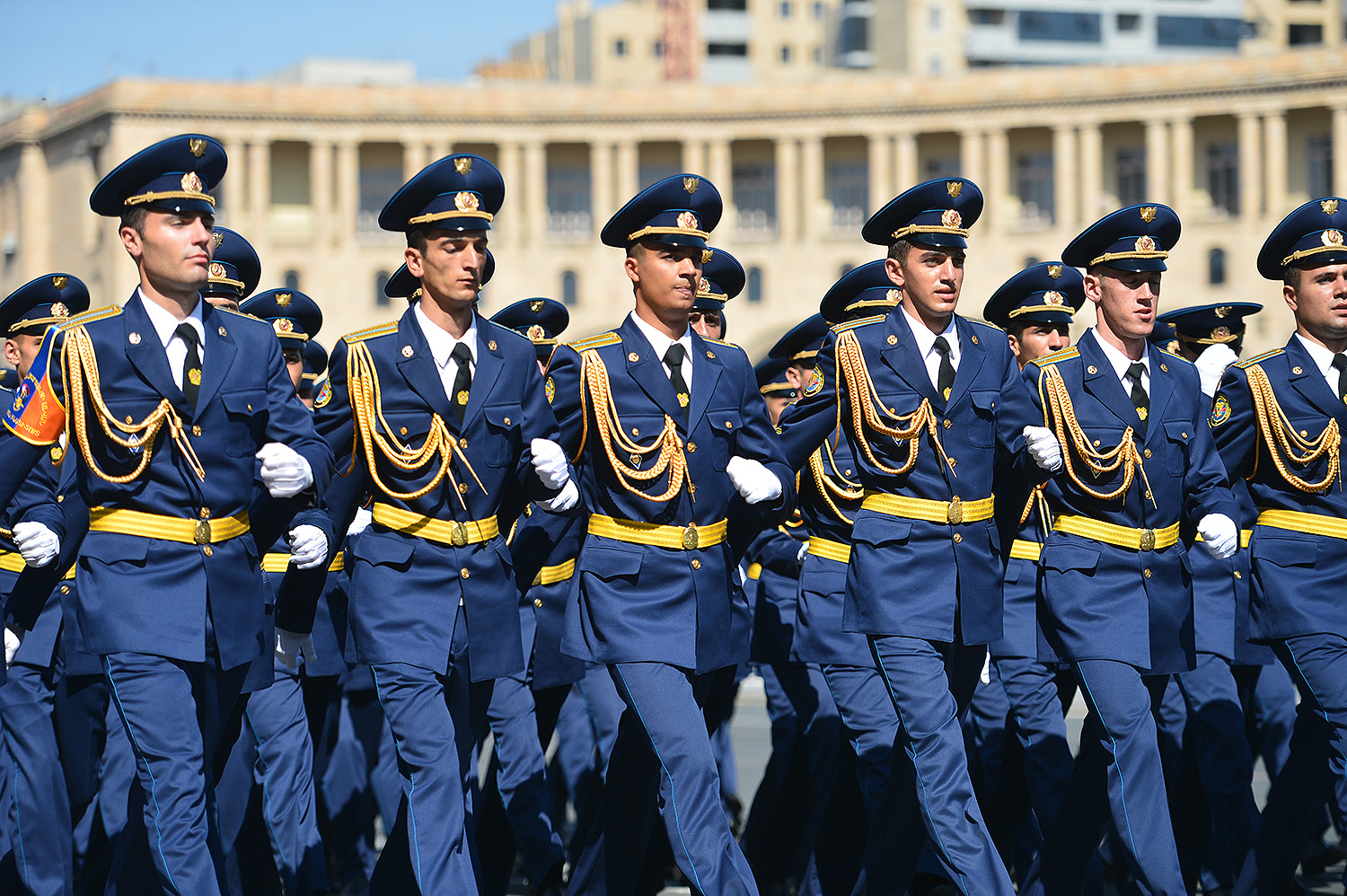
- Type: Military academy
- Active: 1992; 34 years ago – 2023; 3 years ago
- Location: Nor Hachn, Kotayk Province, Armenia
- Language: Armenian, Russian

The Armenak Khanperyants Military Aviation University (Armenian: Արմենակ Խանփերյանցի անվան ռազմական ավիացիոն համալսարան) was a higher educational institution of the Armenian Air Force functioning under the Ministry of Defense of Armenia. Its mission was to prepare and train officers capable of implementing defense tasks in peace and war. It is located in Nor Hachn in the Kotayk Province. Former defense minister Vigen Sargsyan described it as the "Feeder vein of military aviation".

== History ==
It was established on 14 April 1992. By the decision No. 420 of the Government of Armenia, the Republican Aero Club and Arzni Airport were transferred to the subordination of the Ministry of Defense. On 1 April 2005, the university was named after Marshal of Aviation Sergei Khudyakov, using the Armenian version of his name. In 2013, the institute admitted 5 women in 2013, the first military academy to do so. The next year, the Vazgen Sarkissian Military University admitted its first group of female cadets. Now, in 2020, the Prime Minister of Armenia’s wife has formed the first all-women military unit in the ancient country’s history. Since 2015, a course program on "Human Rights" has operated in the university. In 2019, the complex of the Vazgen Sargsyan Military University was merged with the aviation university's complex. In May of that philanthropist Mikael Vardanyan donated 43 million drams worth of exercise equipment to both universities. In 2023, it was merged with the Vazgen Sargsyan Military University and transformed into the Vazgen Sargsyan Military Academy. The decision was made in light of declining enrollment at both universities.

=== List of Commandants of the University ===
- Daniel Balayan (1993-2021)

== Training ==
The faculty of the university provides basic engineering and general military knowledge, while the other 3 faculties are specialized in aviation, signals (aircraft), and anti-aircraft warfare. Arzni Airport serves as the training base of the university. Since 2002, the liaison officers of the Signal Troops Department have been trained at the university, with the first batch graduating in 2006.

== Notable alumni/students ==
- Artur Grigoryan, the director of the communication division who was killed in the 2020 Nagorno-Karabakh conflict.
- Eva Ghazaryan, the first female graduate of the Kristapor Ivanyan Military College.
- Valerie Danelin, Chief of Staff of the Gyumri Assault Aviation Squadron who was killed in action during the 2020 war.

== See also ==
- Ivan Kozhedub National Air Force University
- Talgat Bigeldinov Military Institute of the Air Defence Forces
- List of universities in Armenia
