= Baghramyan, Armavir =

Village in Armavir, Armenia

Baghramyan Բաղրամյան
- Location within Armenia
- Coordinates: 40°11′27″N 43°50′58″E
- Country: Armenia
- Province: Armavir
- Municipality: Baghramyan
- Founded: 1983

Population (2011)
  - Total: 658
- Time zone: UTC+4

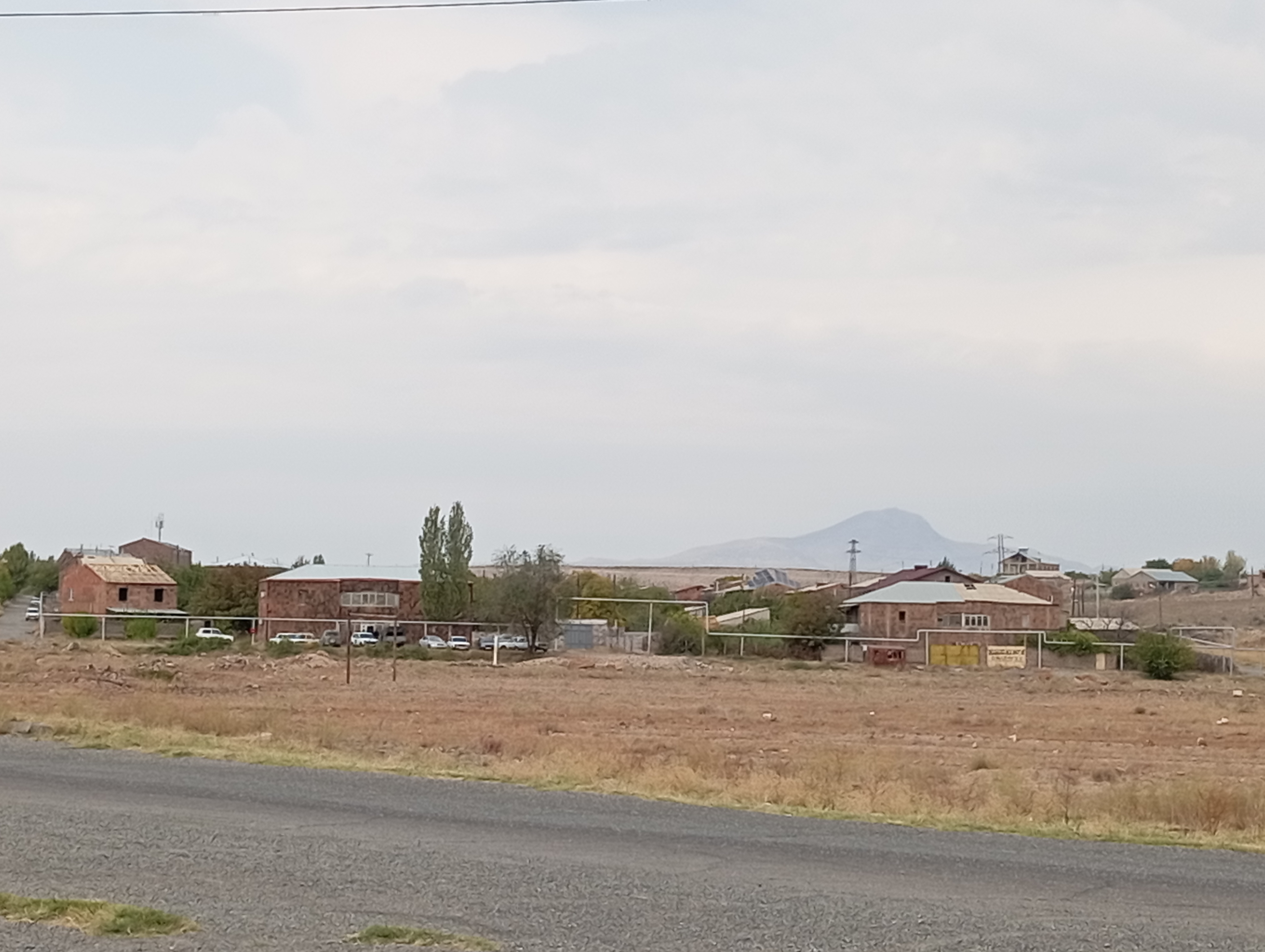
Baghramyan village from afar

Baghramyan (Armenian: Բաղրամյան) is a village in the Armavir Province of Armenia. It is named after the Soviet Armenian military commander and Marshal of the Soviet Union Ivan Bagramyan.
