= Nurnus =

Village in Kotayk, Armenia

Nurnus Նուռնուս
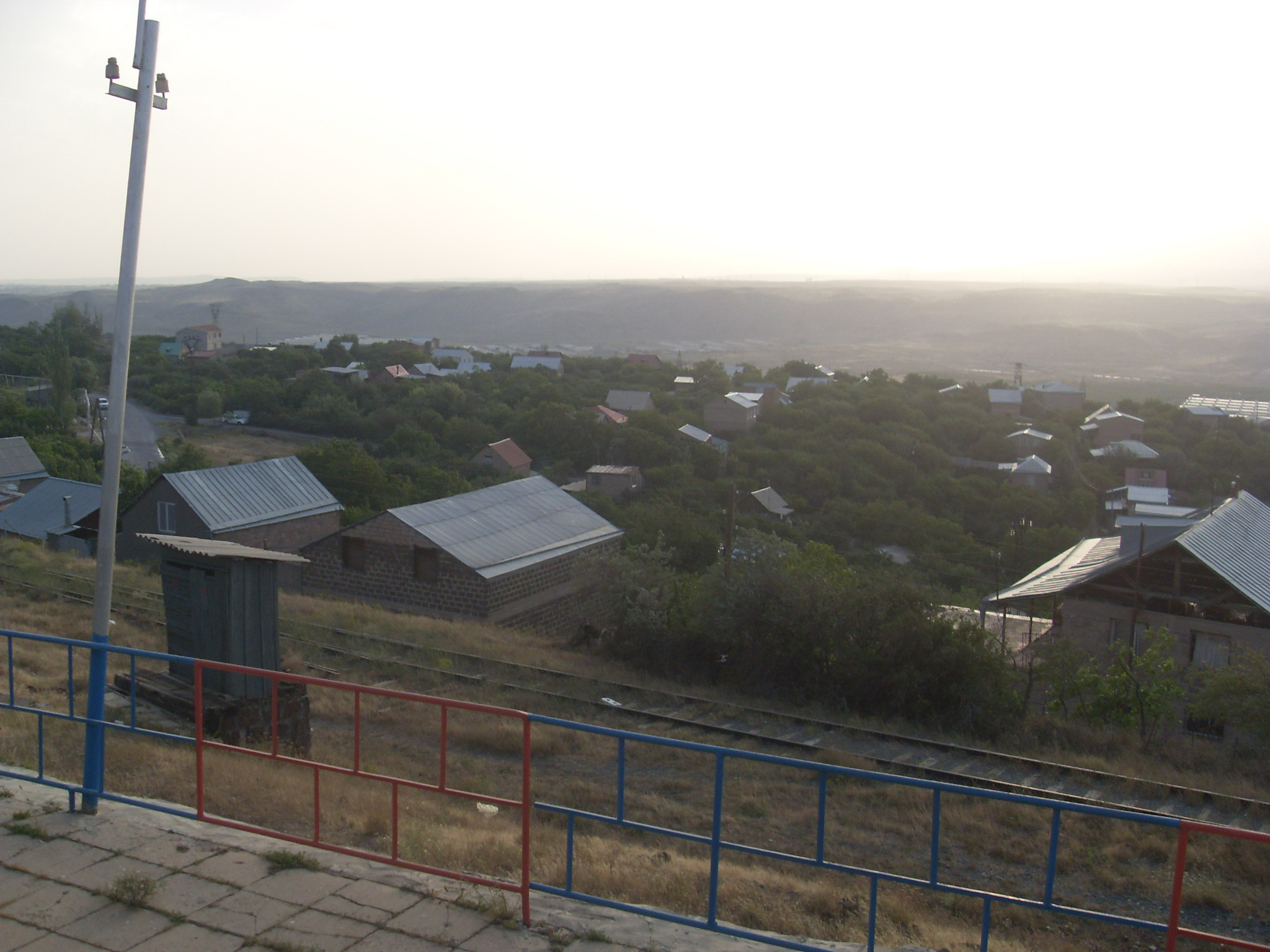
- Nurnus

- Location within Armenia
- Coordinates: 40°21′27″N 44°36′21″E
- Country: Armenia
- Marz (Province): Kotayk
- Elevation: 1,400 m (4,600 ft)

Population (2011)
  - Total: 532
- Time zone: UTC+4 ( )

Nurnus (Armenian: Նուռնուս), is a village in the Kotayk Province of Armenia.

== See also ==
- Kotayk Province
