= Nor Hachn =

Nor Hachn Նոր Հաճն
- Town
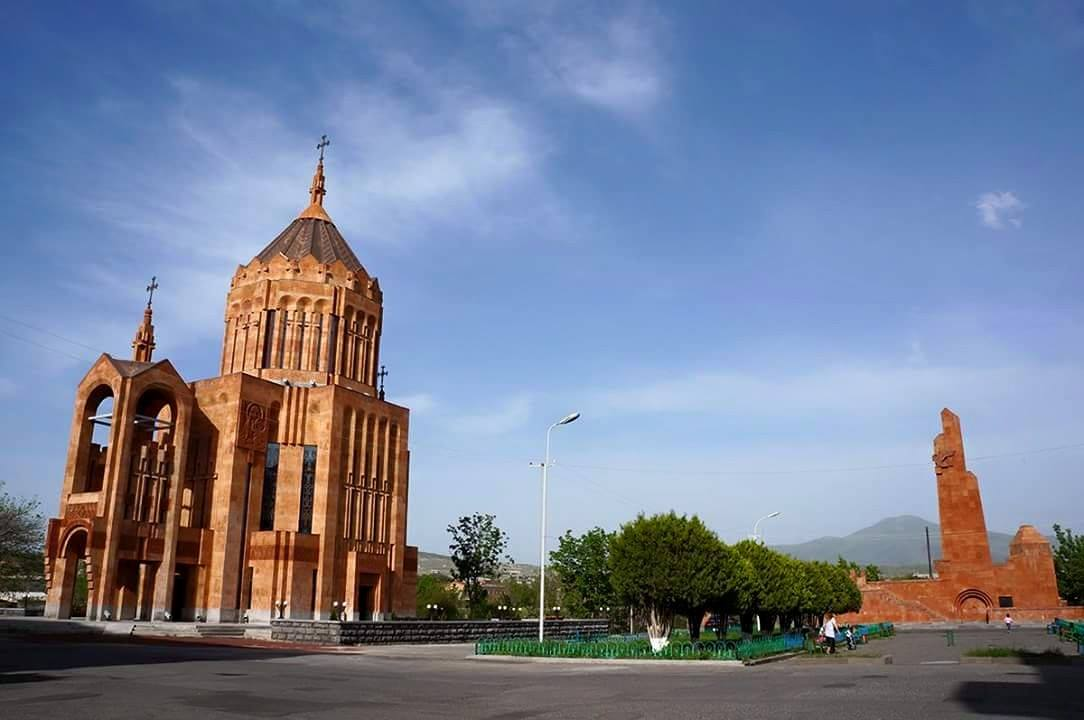
- The church and the memorial of Nor Hachn

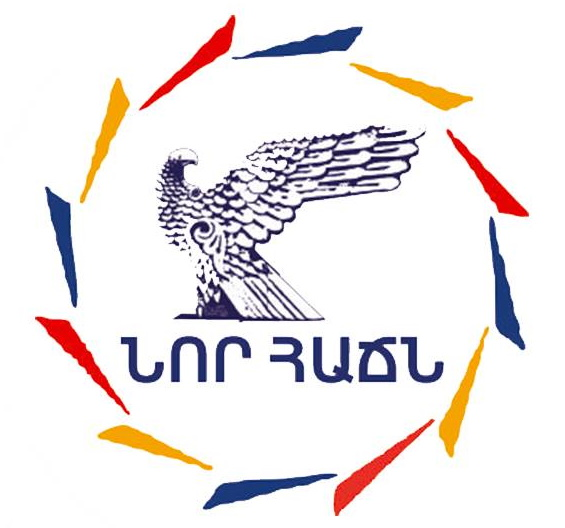
- Coat of arms

- Location within Armenia
- Coordinates: 40°18′0″N 44°34′48″E
- Country: Armenia
- Province: Kotayk
- founded: 1953

Government
  - Mayor: Gagik Matevosyan

Area
  - Total: 2.3 km^{2} (0.89 sq mi)
- Elevation: 1,920 m (6,300 ft)

Population (2022 census)
  - Total: 9,816
  - Density: 4,300/km^{2} (11,000/sq mi)
- Website: Official web

Nor Hachn (Armenian: Նոր Հաճն [nɔɾ ˈhɑt͡ʃən]) is a town and urban municipal community in the Kotayk Province of Armenia, founded in 1953. The town is located on the right bank of Hrazdan River, to the west of the Arzni canyon, on the immediate proximity of the Arzni-Shamiram canal.

As per the 2011 census, Nor Hachn had a population of 9,307. According to the 2016 official estimate, the population is around 8,400. As per the 2022 census, Nor Hachn had a population of 9,816.

== Etymology ==
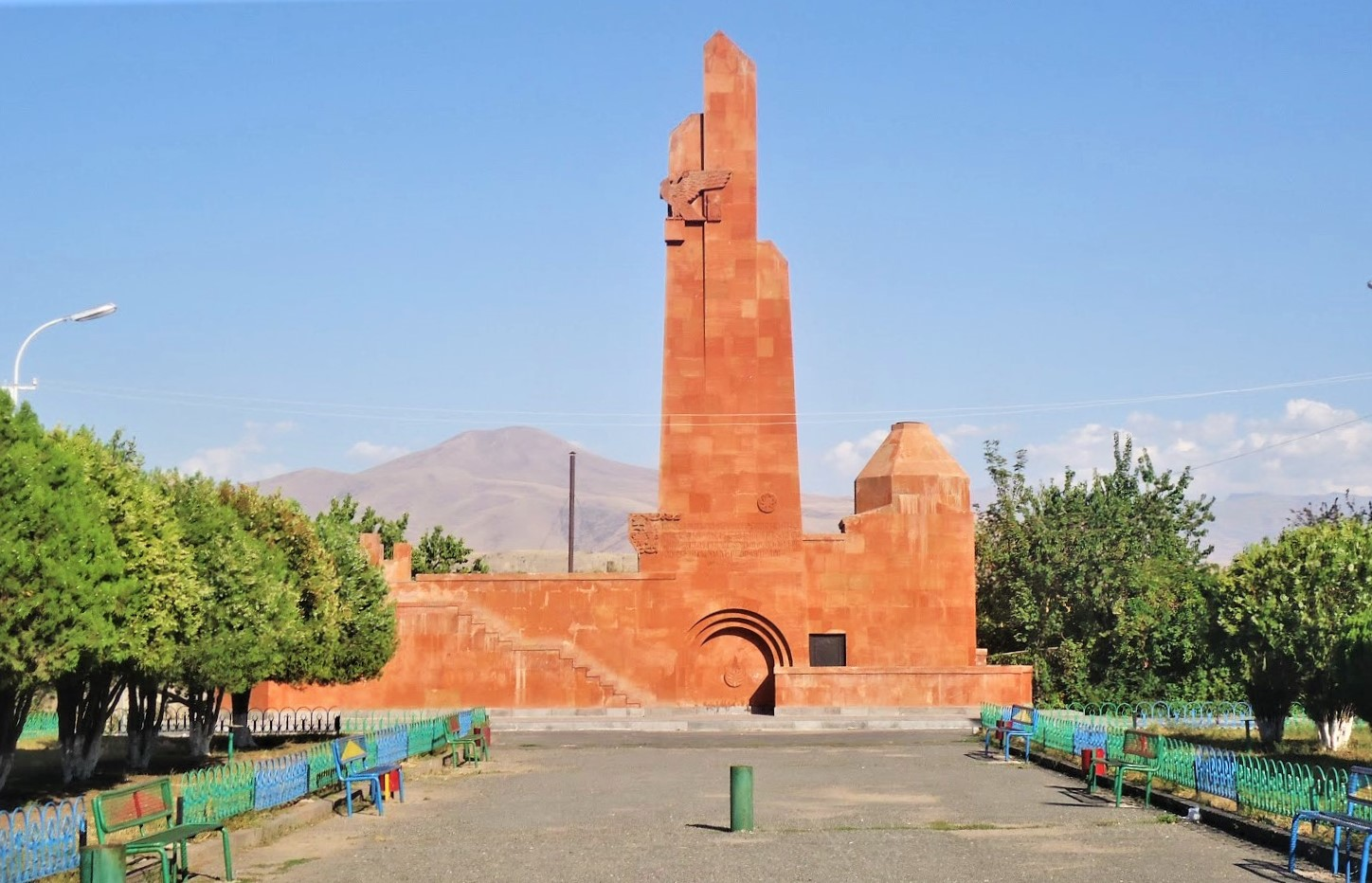
Memorial to the Hadjin resistance in Nor Hachn, opened in 1974

The town is named Nor Hachn, meaning New Hadjin, in memory of the Armenian town of Hadjin in Cilicia, where a group of local fedayis organized a military resistance against the Turkish forces in 1920.

Prior to the 1915 Armenian genocide, Hadjin had a population of 35,000, of which 30,000 were Armenians and the rest were Turks. Most of the Armenians were either massacred or taken to the Deir ez-Zor concentration camps in the Syrian desert. After the Armistice of Mudros in 1918, Cilicia became a protectorate of France as part of the Triple Entente. Consequently, around 8,000 Armenian genocide survivors returned to Hadjin with the withdrawal of the Ottoman forces. However, the French troops left Cilicia in 1920, paving the way for the advance of the Turkish forces led by Mustafa Kemal. On April 1, 1920, Turkish troops led by Kemal Doğan launched an offensive against the Armenians of Hadjin who organized a military resistance, which lasted until October 15, 1920, when the Turks occupied the entire city. Most of the remaining 6,000 Armenians were massacred or killed during the military operations. The surviving 365 Armenians of Hadjin took refuge in Aleppo and Lebanon.

== History ==
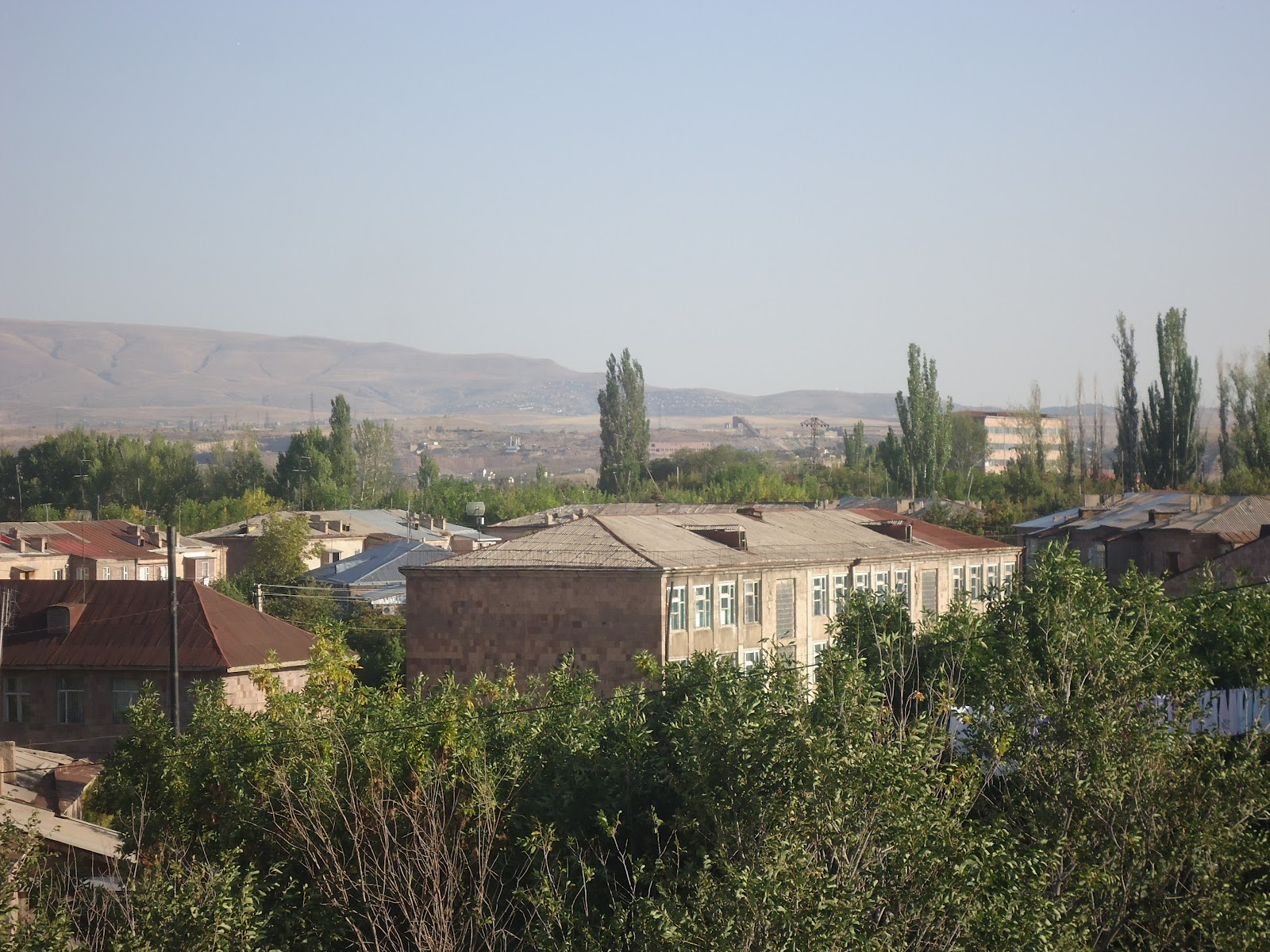
Nor Hachn

The geographical location of present-day Nor Hachn corresponds with the location of the historical Kotayk canton of the Ayrarat province of the ancient Greater Armenia.

In 1953, a small settlement was founded near the village of Arzni to accommodate the workers of the nearby hydro power plants, mainly the Arzni Hydro Power Plant which was opened in 1956. Subsequently, the settlement became popularly known as "Silovoy" (the Russian name of the power generator plant). With the establishment of the "Sapfir" stone-processing factory in 1958, along with many other industrial plants, a planned urban settlement was developed in the area of Silovoy settlement. During the 1960s, the new settlement was named Nor Hachn (New Hadjin) in memory of the Armenian town of Hadjin in Cilicia (nowadays known as Saimbeyli in modern-day Turkish Republic).

Between 1988 and 1990, 374 Armenian refugees from Azerbaijan were resettled in Nor Hachn.

Nor Hachn used to be a major industrial centre within the Armenian Soviet Socialist Republic. However, after the independence of Armenia in 1991, very few industrial plants have survived in the town.

The town has been home to the "Lori" diamond-processing plant since 1992. The other; "Shoghakn" diamond-processing plant was closed in 2007.

== Geography ==
Nor Hachn is located in Kotayk Province on the right bank of Hrazdan River, 20 km north of capital Yerevan. It has an average height of 1,920 metres (6,300 feet) above sea level. Mount Hatis is located around 12 km east of Nor Hachn, while the Mount of Ara is around 13 km northwest of the town.

Nor Hachn is bordered by the village of Arzni and the town of Byureghavan on the east, the village of Nor Geghi on the north, the village of Nor Artamet on the west and the village of Getamej on the south. The Yeghvard training airfield is located to the west of Nor Hachn.

The climate of Nor Hachn is continental and dry with relatively hot summers and extremely cold winters.

== Demographics ==
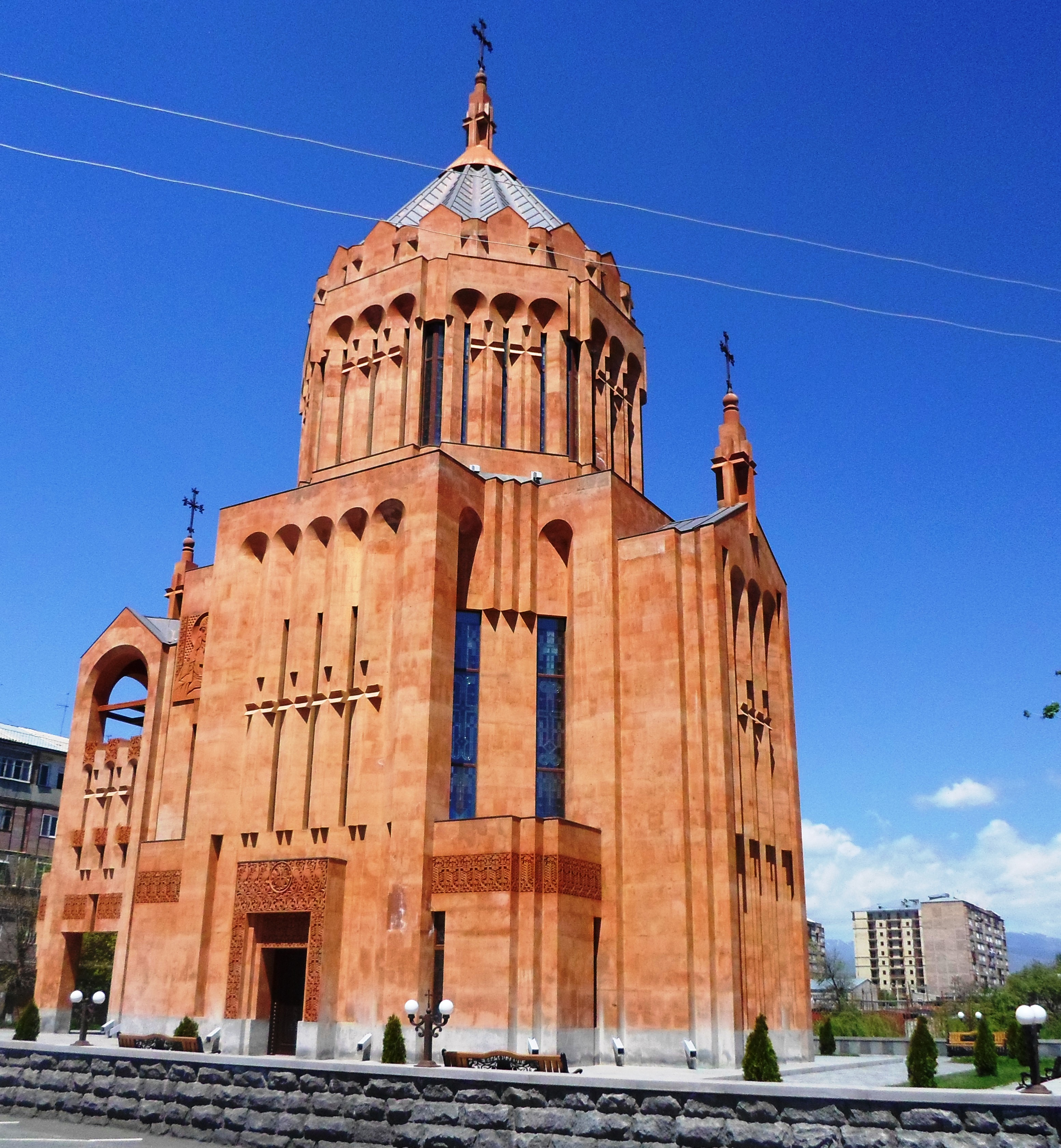
Surp Amenaprkich (Holy Saviour) Church

Nor Hachn is mainly populated by Armenians who belong to the Armenian Apostolic Church. The Holy Saviour's Church consecrated in July 2015, is the main church of the town. Designed by the renowned architect Artak Ghulyan, the church was built through donations from Gagik Tsarukyan. President Serzh Sargsyan and Catholicos Karekin II attended the consecration ceremony.

Historical population
| Year | Pop. | ±% p.a. |
|---|---|---|
| 1959 | 1,406 | — |
| 1975 | 5,671 | +9.11% |
| 1989 | 11,091 | +4.91% |
| 2001 | 10,168 | −0.72% |
| 2011 | 9,307 | −0.88% |
| 2022 | 9,816 | +0.49% |

== Culture ==
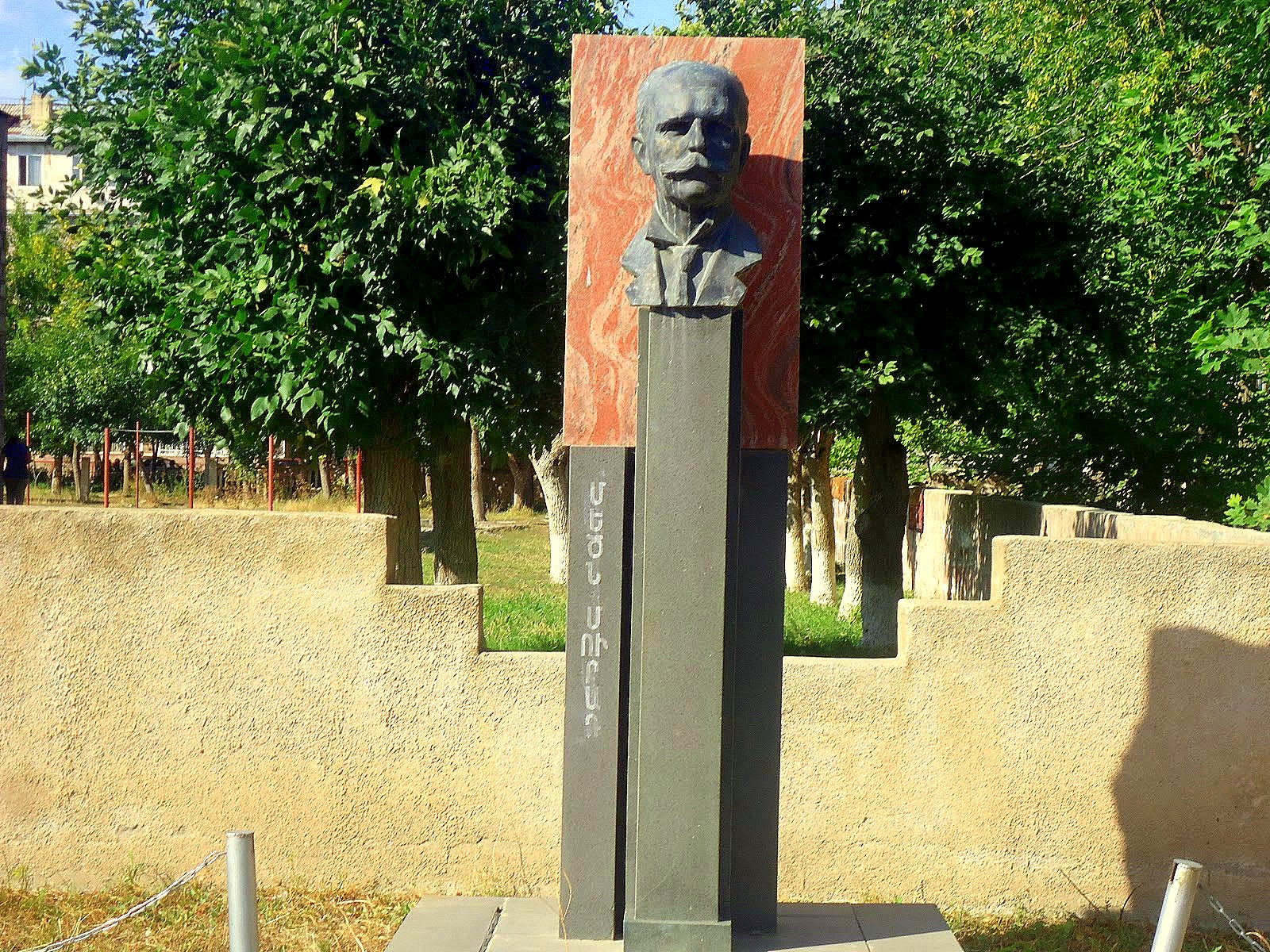
The statue of Metsn Murad, a leading Armenian fedayi and activist against the Ottomans, native to Hadjin

Nor Hachn has many cultural institutions, including a central library, a school of arts opened in 1968 and a house of culture opened in 1971.

In 1974, a memorial to the Hadjin resistance was erected in Nor Hachn. It was designed by architect Rafael Israelyan. The memorial is home to the museum of "History of the Armenians of Cilicia", operating since 1978. The museum depicts the history of the Armenian Kingdom of Cilicia, the culture of the Cilicia region, as well as the history of Hadjin and the 1920 resistance against the Ottomans. The museum is directed by the town council.

Every year, on the 2nd Sunday of October, Armenians from all over the world -mainly descendants of historic Hadjin- gather in Nor Hachn to commemorate the 1920 Hadjin Resistance.

== Transportation ==
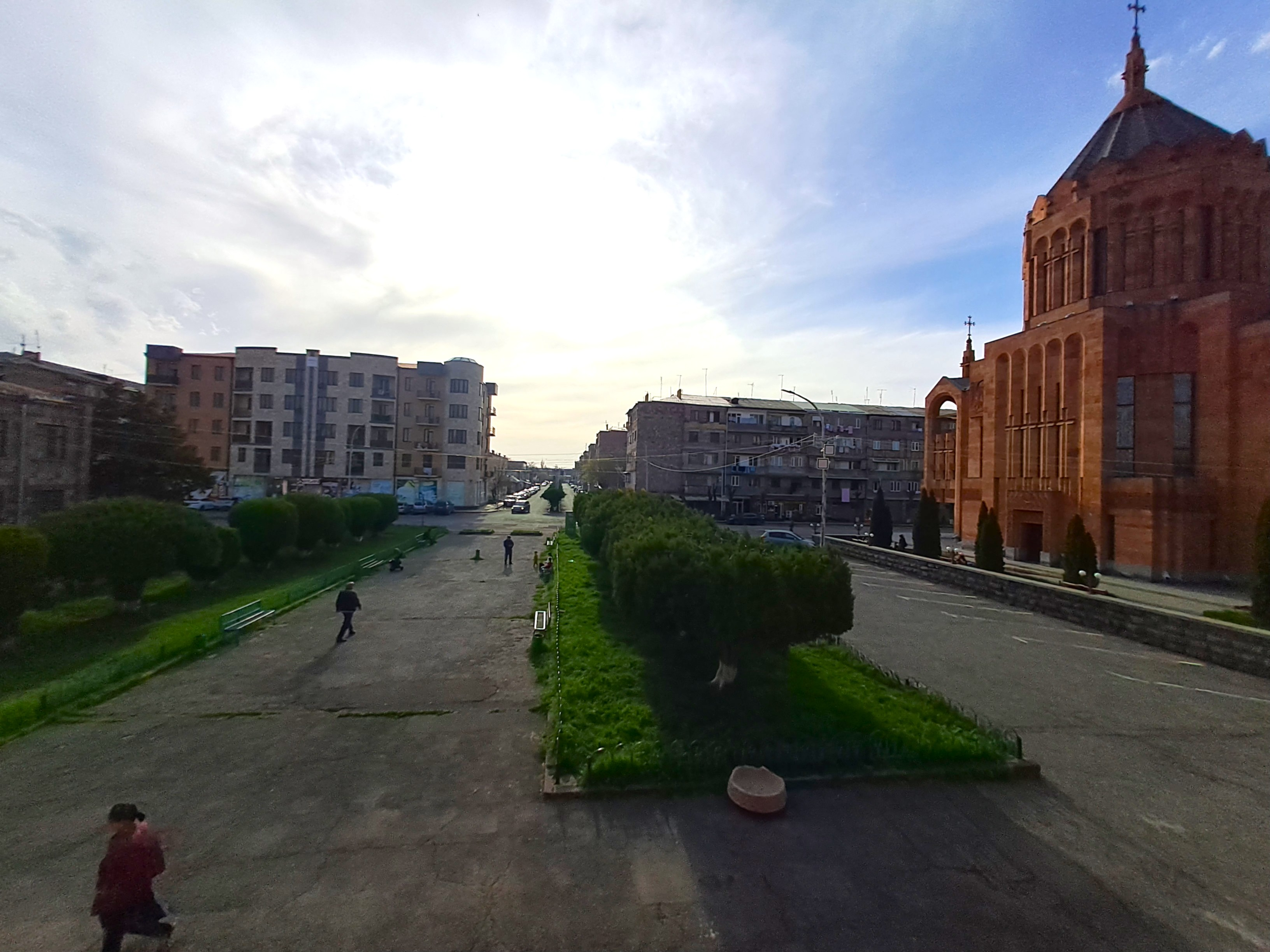
The main street of the town

=== Roads ===
The H5 highway runs by the west side of the town, connecting with the larger M4 motorway leading to Yerevan.

=== Air ===
Arzni airfield, housing the Armenak Khanperyants Military Aviation University is located to the west of Nor Hachn. There are various training airplanes and helicopters stationed at the base on one of the runways, while a sizable number military vehicles and artillery are located on the other runway.

=== Railway ===
Nor Hachn has a small railway station south of the town, however the Yerevan Western bypass railway line on which it is located is currently only used by South Caucasus Railway freight trains.

== Economy ==
Nor Hachn was once famous for its diamond cutting plants with many enterprises operated during the Soviet period and the first years of the independence. Currently, the town is home to a small number of diamond cutting firms, as well as many other manufacturing enterprises.

== Education ==
As of 2017, Nor Hachn is home to 1 pre-school kindergarten, 4 primary schools and 1 high school.

The town is home to the Armenak Armenak Khanperyants Military Aviation University of the Ministry of Defence of Armenia, operating since 1992. The faculty of general education of the university, provides basic engineering and general military knowledge, while the other 3 faculties are specialized in aviation, signal (aircraft), and anti-aircraft warfare.

== Sport ==
Hachn FC was a football club from Nor Hachn, used to play their home games at the Hachn City Stadium of 5,000 seats. The club was dissolved in early 1997 due to financial difficulties and is currently inactive from professional football.

== See also ==
- Saimbeyli
