= Sarukhan =

Village in Gegharkunik, Armenia

Sarukhan Սարուխան
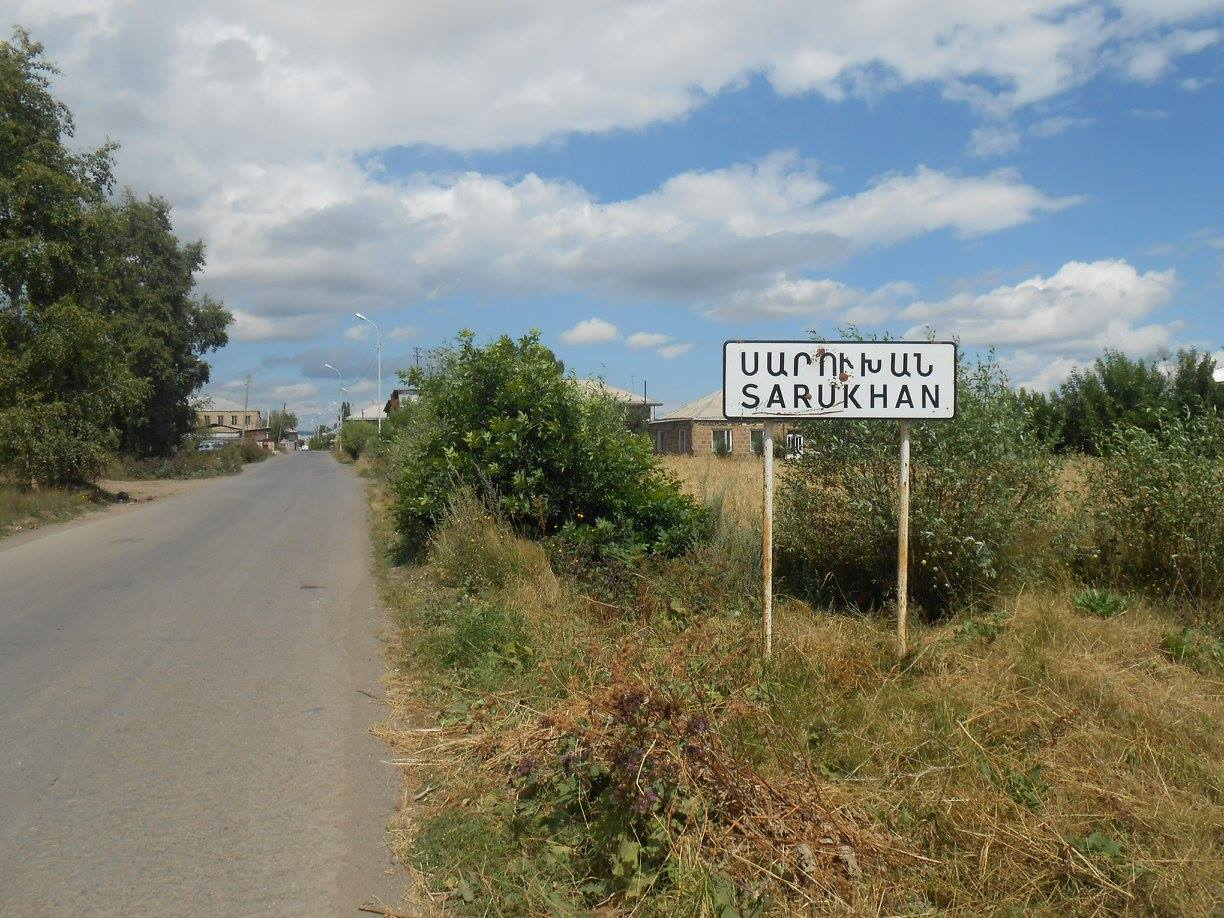
- Village entrance

- Location within Armenia Location within Gegharkunik
- Coordinates: 40°17′21″N 45°08′03″E
- Country: Armenia
- Province: Gegharkunik
- Municipality: Gavar

Population (2011)
  - Total: 8,309
- Time zone: UTC+4 (AMT)

Sarukhan (Armenian: Սարուխան) is a village in the Gavar Municipality of the Gegharkunik Province of Armenia.

== Etymology ==
The village was named Sarukhan in honor of the communist activist Hovhannes Sarukhanian (1882-1920). The village was previously known as Dalikardash.

== Gallery ==
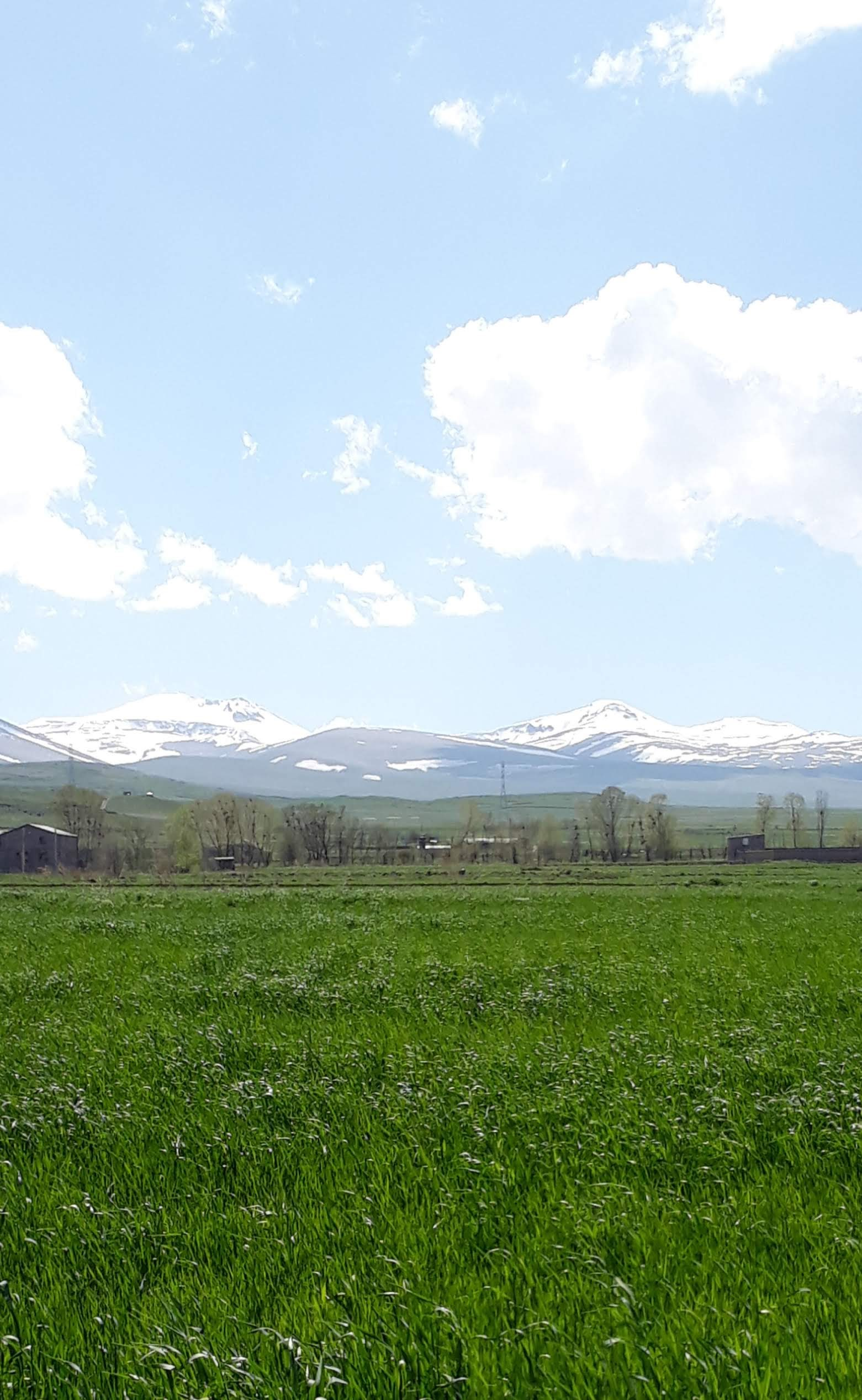
A view of Sarukhan
