= Pokr Mantash =

Pokr Mantash Փոքր Մանթաշ
- Location within Armenia Location within Shirak
- Coordinates: 40°39′N 44°03′E
- Country: Armenia
- Province: Shirak
- Municipality: Artik

Population (2011)
  - Total: 3,040
- Time zone: UTC+4
  - Summer (DST): UTC+5

Pokr Mantash (Armenian: Փոքր Մանթաշ) is a village in the Artik Municipality of the Shirak Province of Armenia.

== Demographics ==
Historical population
Year	Pop.	±% p.a.
1831	72	—
1886	590	+3.90%
1922	903	+1.19%
1931	1,035	+1.53%
1959	1,169	+0.44%
1970	1,557	+2.64%
1979	1,707	+1.03%
2001	2,228	+1.22%
2011	3,040	+3.16%
