= Nor Geghi =

Village in Kotayk, Armenia

Nor Geghi Նոր Գեղի
- Location within Armenia
- Coordinates: 40°19′16″N 44°34′47″E
- Country: Armenia
- Province: Kotayk
- Elevation: 1,347 m (4,419 ft)

Population (2011 census)
  - Total: 5,319

Nor Geghi (Armenian: Նոր Գեղի) is a major village in the Kotayk Province of Armenia, located around 22 km north of the capital Yerevan, near the town of Nor Hachen. As of the 2011 census, the population of the village is 5,319.

== Archaeology ==
A 2014 study published in the journal Science discovered Levallois and bifacial stone tools in an archaeological site near Nor Geghi. The artifacts, found preserved in soil under a later lava flow and dated at 325,000 – 335,000 years old, were a mix of two distinct stone tool technology traditions: bifacial tools and Levallois tools. Daniel Adler suggests that the coexistence of bifacial and Levallois tools at the site provides the first clear evidence that local populations developed Levallois technology out of existing bifacial technology and that the artifacts found at Nor Geghi reflect the technological flexibility and variability of a single population. He further concludes that this challenges the view that technological change resulted from population change and suggests instead that Levallois technology developed independently from existing technology within different human populations who shared a common technological ancestry.

== See also ==
- Kotayk Province
