= Yeghegnut, Lori =

Yeghegnut Եղեգնուտ
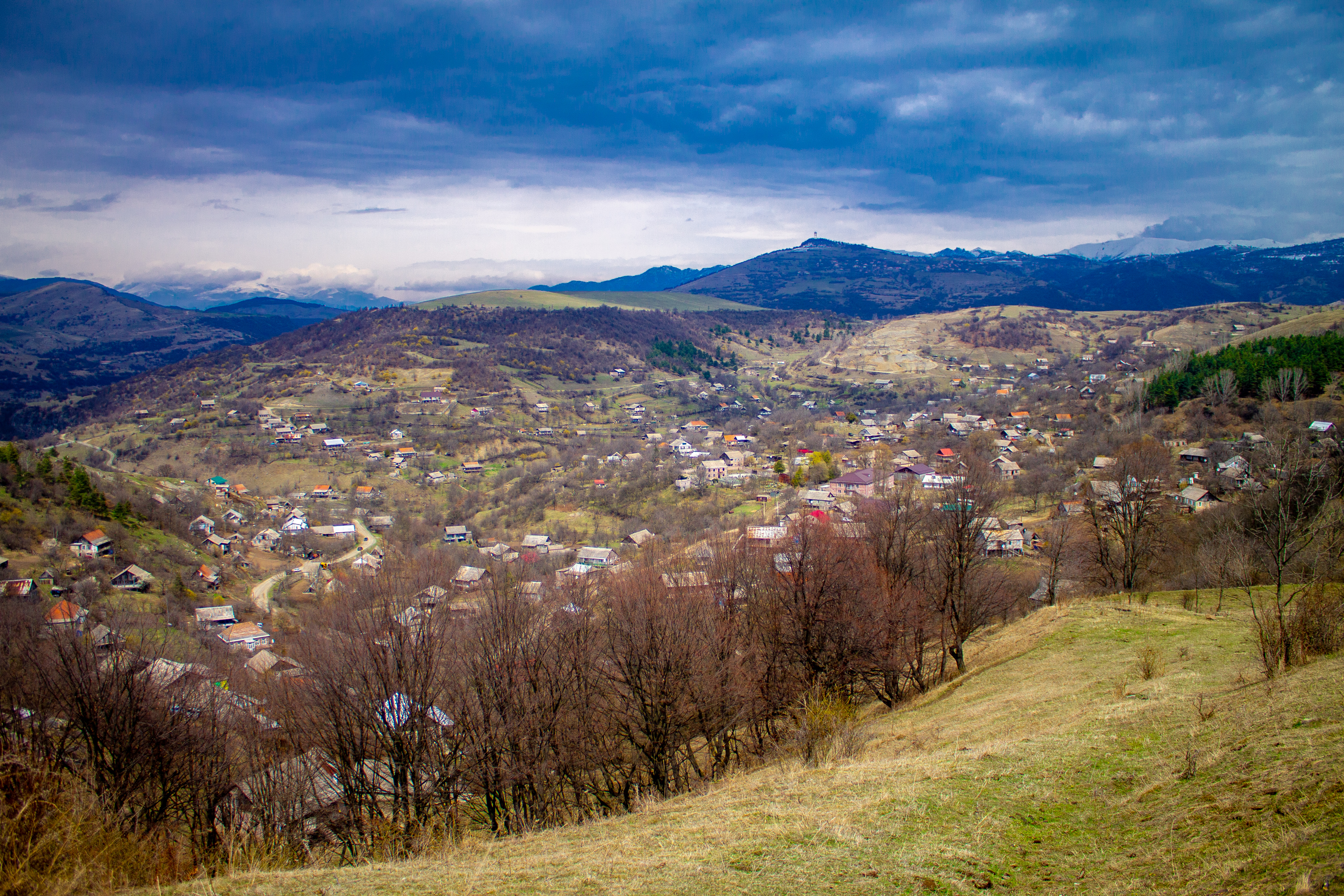

- Location within Armenia
- Coordinates: 40°54′15″N 44°37′57″E
- Country: Armenia
- Marz (Province): Lori
- Elevation: 1,096 m (3,596 ft)

Population (2011)
  - Total: 893
- Time zone: UTC+4 ( )
  - Summer (DST): UTC+5 ( )

Yeghegnut (Armenian: Եղեգնուտ, also Romanized as Yekheknut, Yekhegnut, Yegegnut, and Eghegnut; formerly, Kamyshkut) is a town in the Lori Province of Armenia.
