= Arzni =

Arzni Արզնի
- Village
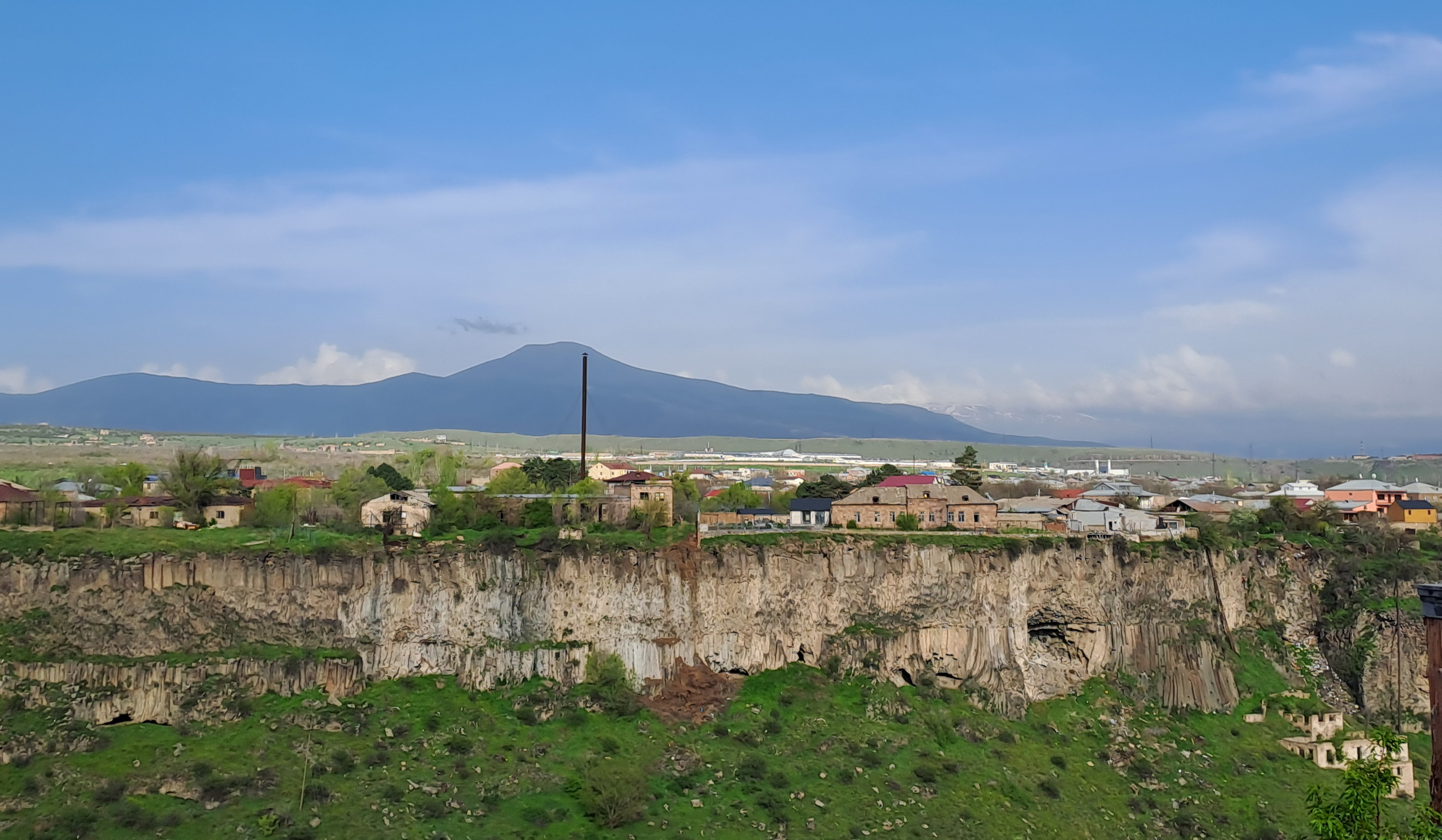
- Arzni from Nor Hachn

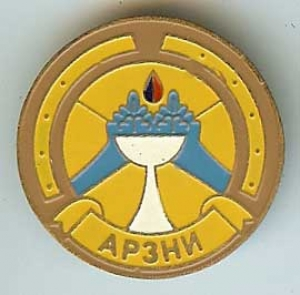
- Coat of arms

- Location within Armenia
- Coordinates: 40°17′47″N 44°35′45″E
- Country: Armenia
- Province: Kotayk

Population (2011)
  - Total: 2,422

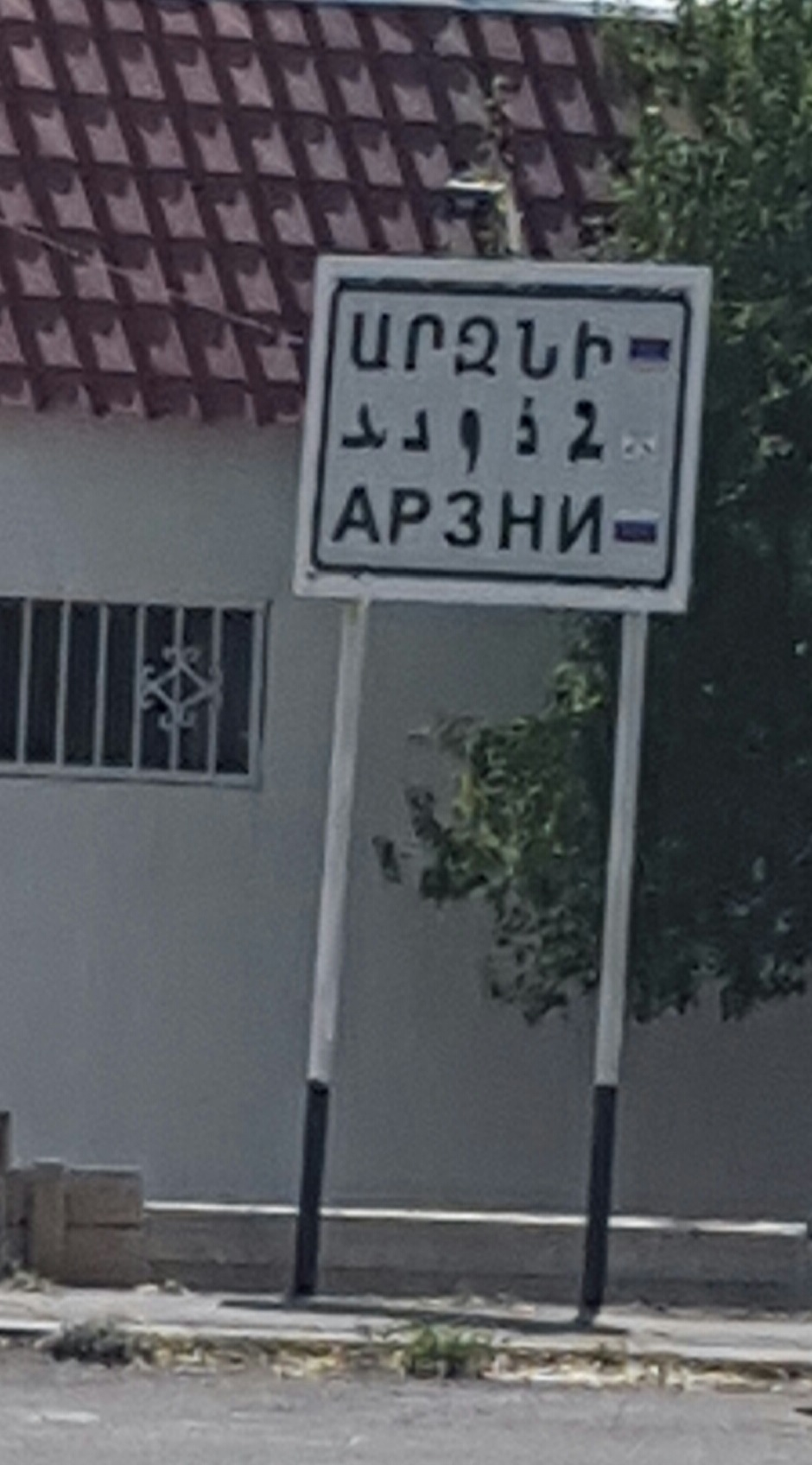
Sign at the entrance of town with "Arzni" in Armenian, Assyrian Neo-Aramaic, and Russian.

Arzni (Armenian: Արզնի, Syriac: ܐܪܙܢܝ, Russian: Арзни), is a resort village in the Kotayk Province of Armenia located by the Hrazdan River canyon. The modern village was founded on the place of old Armenian village called Arzni and mentioned by Movses Khorenatsi during the 19th century by Assyrian Christians who migrated to Eastern Armenia from Iran. The village is predominantly inhabited by Assyrians.

== Notable people ==
- Sergey Sarkhoshev, Hero of the Soviet Union

== Gallery ==
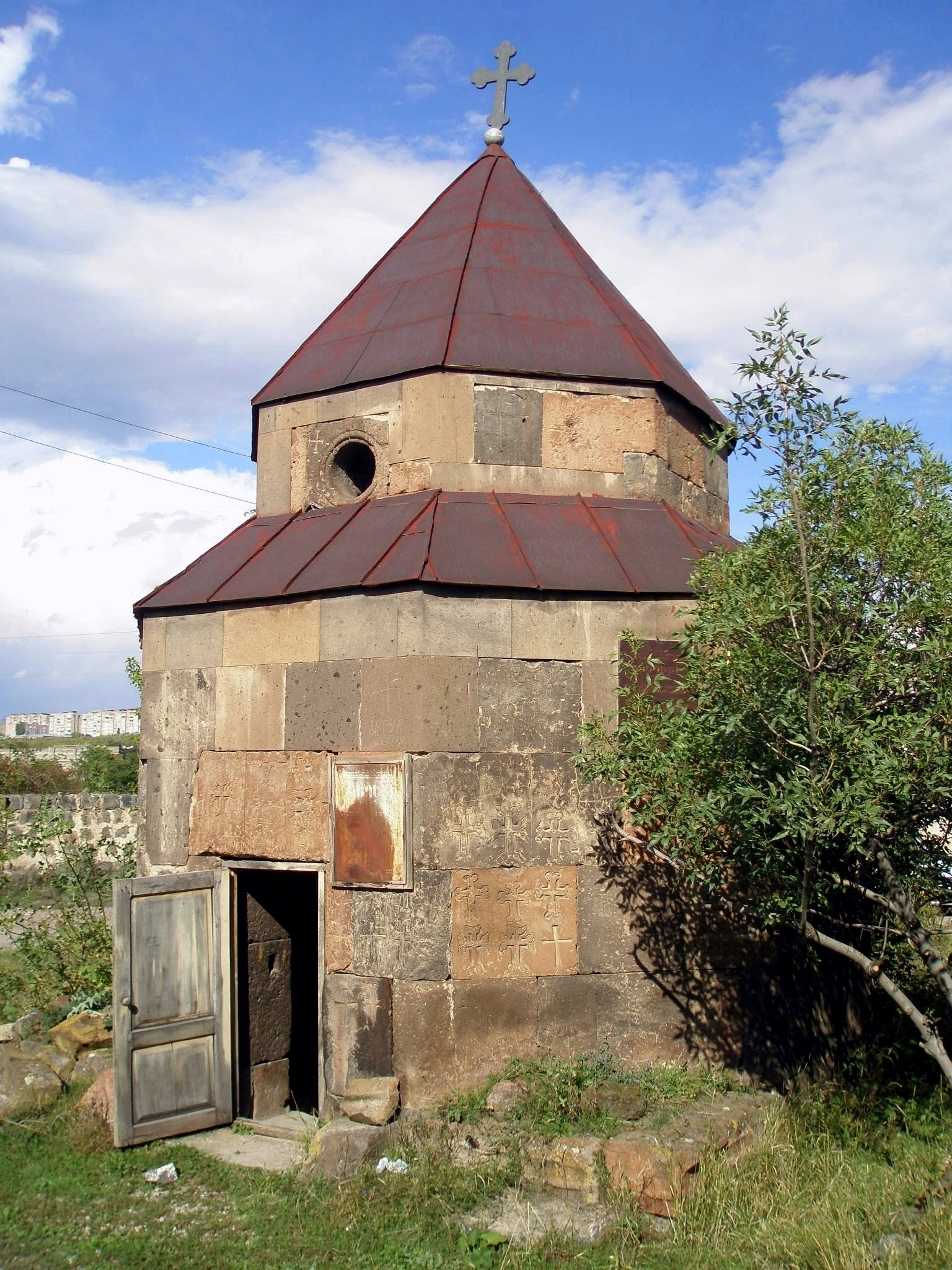
S. Kiraki Church, 6th century

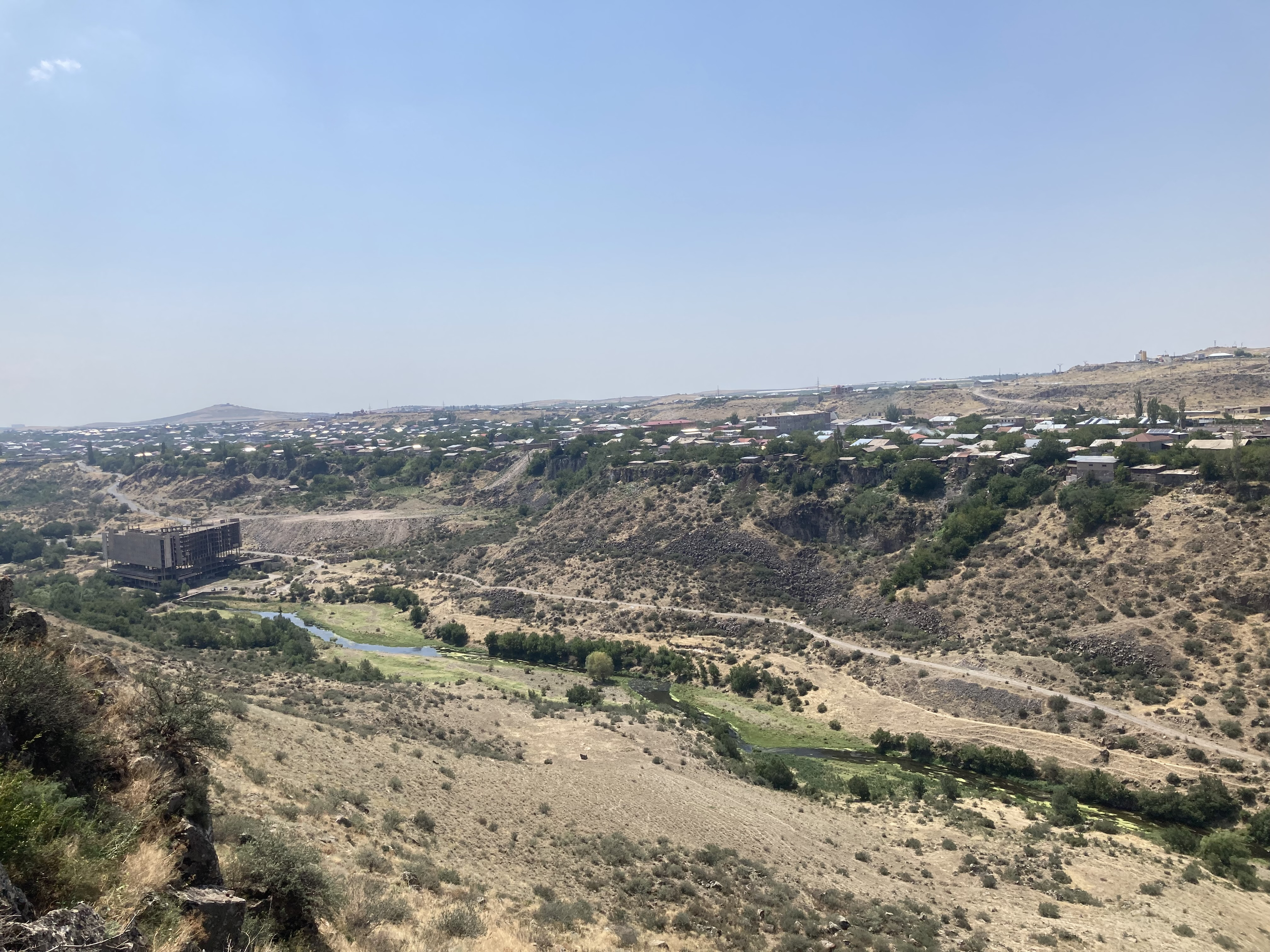
Valley of Arzni

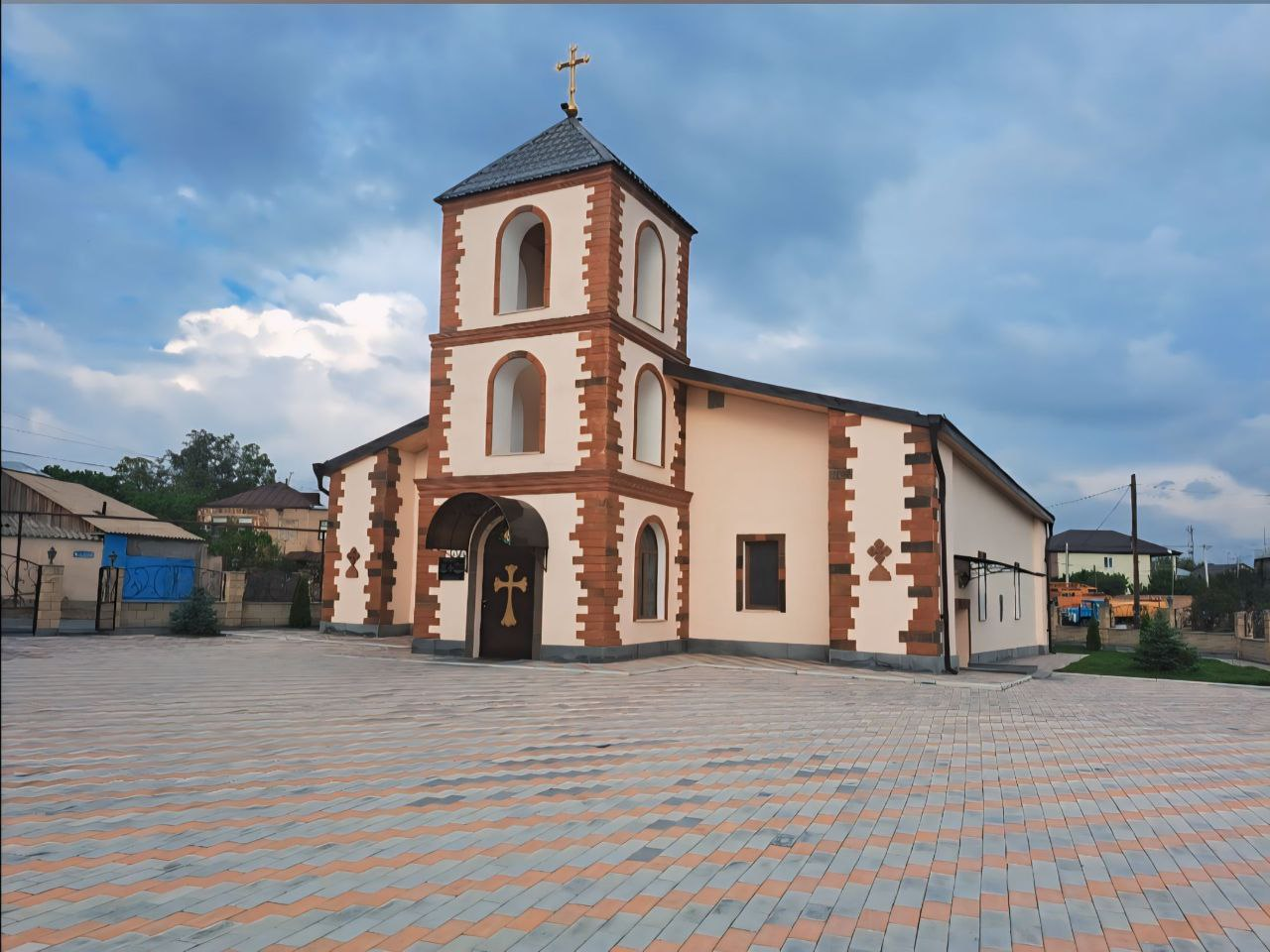
Assyrian church of the Mother of God in Arzni
