= Arapi, Armenia =

Arapi Առափի
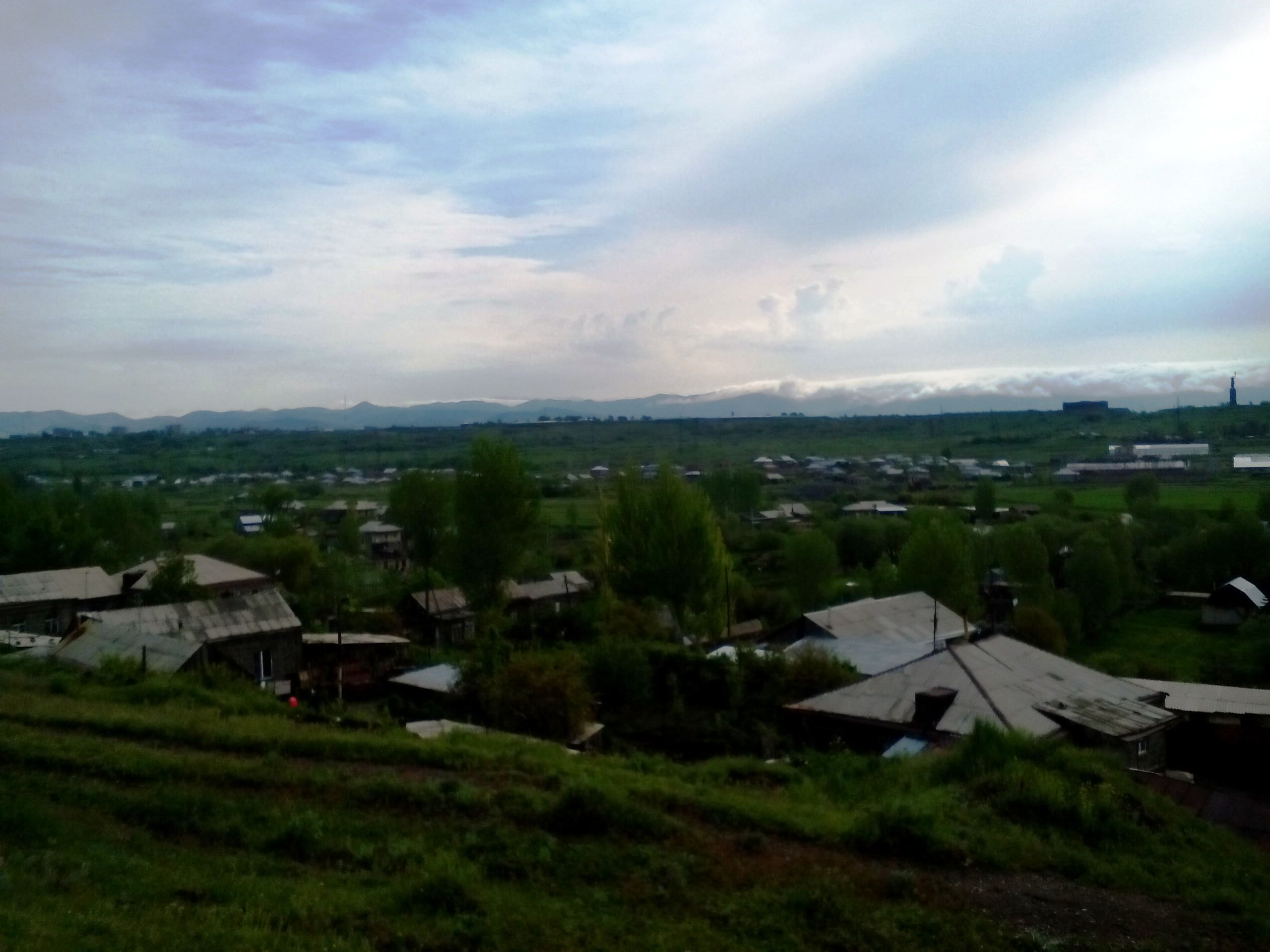

- Location within Armenia Location within Shirak
- Coordinates: 40°46′47″N 43°48′02″E
- Country: Armenia
- Province: Shirak
- Municipality: Akhuryan
- Elevation: 1,500 m (4,900 ft)

Population (2011)
  - Total: 1,795
- Time zone: UTC+4
  - Summer (DST): UTC+5

Arapi (Armenian: Առափի) is a village in the Akhuryan Municipality of the Shirak Province of Armenia. Statistical Committee of Armenia reported its population was 2,053 in 2010, up from 1,980 at the 2001 census.

== Demographics ==
Historical population
Year	Pop.	±% p.a.
1886	577	—
1914	989	+1.94%
1931	1,087	+0.56%
1959	1,359	+0.80%
1970	1,511	+0.97%
1979	1,589	+0.56%
1989	2,075	+2.70%
2001	1,980	−0.39%
2004	2,035	+0.92%
2011	1,795	−1.78%
