= Mets Mantash =

Mets Mantash Մեծ Մանթաշ
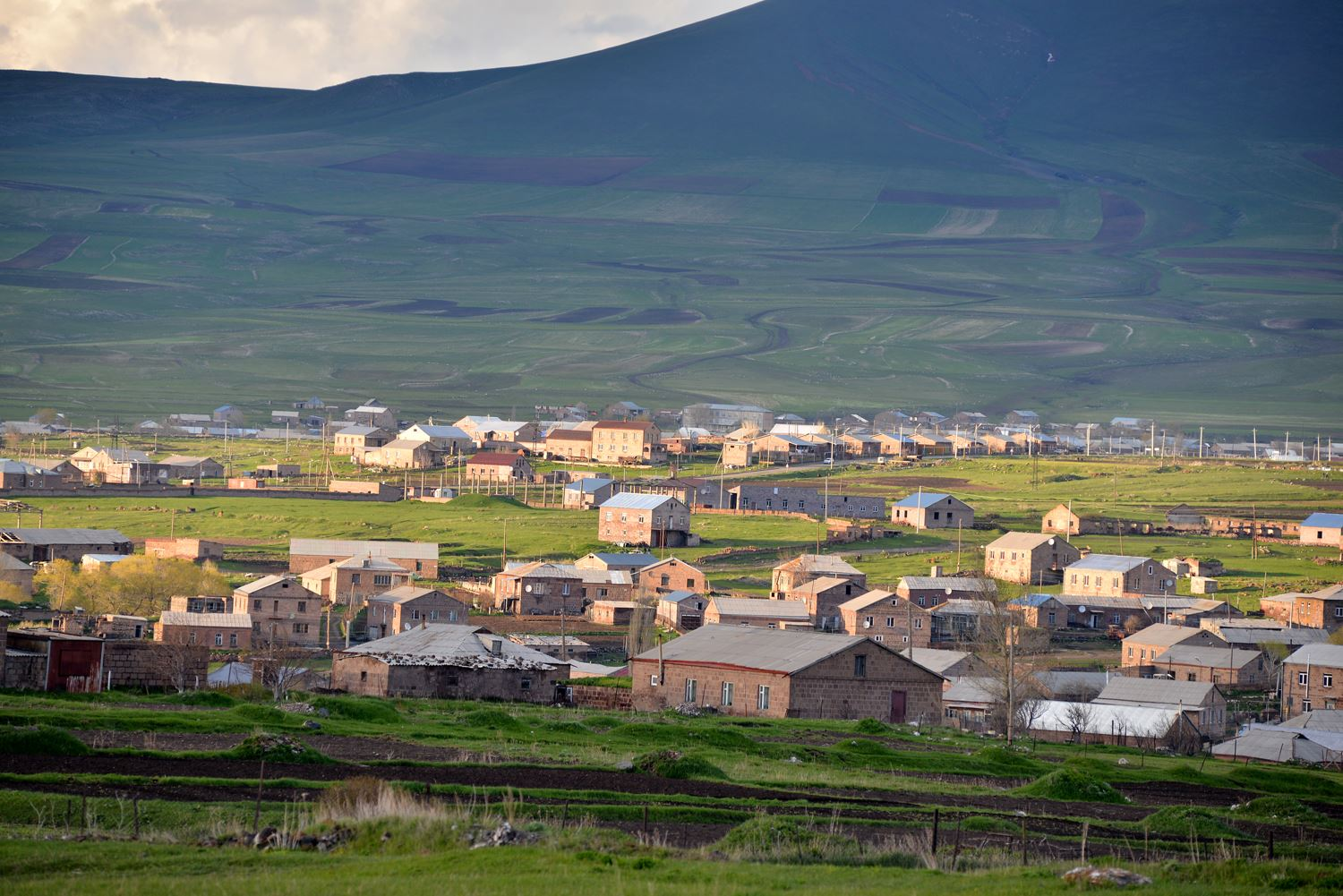

- Location within Armenia Location within Shirak
- Coordinates: 40°38′58″N 44°03′03″E
- Country: Armenia
- Province: Shirak
- Municipality: Artik

Population (2011)
  - Total: 2,550
- Time zone: UTC+4
  - Summer (DST): UTC+5

Mets Mantash (Armenian: Մեծ Մանթաշ) is a village in the Artik Municipality of the Shirak Province of Armenia.

== Demographics ==
Historical population
Year	Pop.	±% p.a.
1831	208	—
1897	1,278	+2.79%
1926	1,882	+1.34%
1939	1,754	−0.54%
1959	1,651	−0.30%
1970	1,834	+0.96%
1979	1,759	−0.46%
2001	2,253	+1.13%
2011	2,550	+1.25%
