= Lernapat =

Lernapat Լեռնապատ
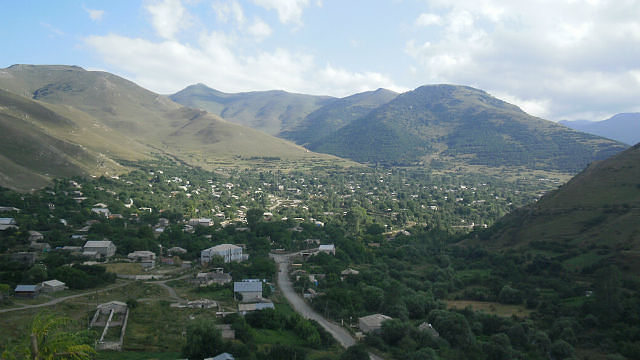

- Location within Armenia
- Coordinates: 40°49′12″N 44°23′50″E
- Country: Armenia
- Marz (Province): Lori Province

Population (2011)
  - Total: 1,661
- Time zone: UTC+4 ( )

Lernapat (Armenian: Լեռնապատ, also romanized as Lerrnapat; formerly, Makarashen and Gadzhikara) is a village in the Lori Province of Armenia, located around 5 kilometres north-west of the Vanadzor.

== Geography ==
Lernajur river flows through the territory of Lernapat, which joins Pambak. The village borders Arjut, Nor Khachakap, Darpas, Lernajur villages. The mountain wall is surrounded by the mountains of the Pambak mountain range.

The climate is harsh in winter, up to -28 °C, and cool in summer, +30 °C.

The surface of the village is mountainous. The average height is about 1800 m above sea level. Mountain forest and mountain meadow landscapes are widespread, the tree species that make up the forest are oak, ash, beech, fir, etc. Wolf, bear, fox, hare, hyena, squirrel, hedgehog, weasel are among the animals of the village's fauna, and reptiles are also found in dry areas.

The climate is temperate, all seasons are clearly defined. Due to the high altitude, the climatic seasons are different from the calendar seasons, summer is relatively short and winter is relatively long. It has clean mountain air.

There are mines of construction materials, mineral springs in the territory of the village.

Lernajur river flows through here.

There are industrial enterprises in the village, for example, mining, food industry enterprises, there is also a water power plant.

Both animal husbandry and plant breeding branches are developing in the village. Cattle breeding, poultry breeding, sheep breeding, pig breeding, beekeeping, as well as fish breeding in artificial ponds are very popular among cattle breeding. Vegetable cultivation and fruit orchard cultivation are mainly popular among crops.

== Name ==
The first part of the name Hajigarh, Haji, is of Arabic origin and means pilgrim, while Gharan is of Turkish origin and means black or dark, meaning "black pilgrim" (a person who has made a pilgrimage to Mecca and returned).

In the tax list of the Ottoman tax register of 1828, Pambak province had 89 villages (the name of the village, the first and last names of the inhabitants, the number of taxpayers, the number of houses and the religion, then the type and amount of the tax were mentioned in the tax register), of which Hajikara was the 3rd in terms of population with 30 taxpayers. (only the number of able-bodied men is indicated). In the Harkamatian it is written about Hajighara. "The second name of Bula is the village of Haji Kara, subject to fanbucks (a type of tax)." Only here we meet the name Bula, which may have been the real name of the village, but it was forgotten among the Islamic rulers and the new name Hajighara, more suitable for Muslims, was used. The etymology of the name Bula is not known.

From 1946 to 1957, the village was named Makarashen in honor of the famous agriculturalist Makar Matsaki Hakobyan. Makar was awarded the Order of Lenin in 1939.

On October 26, 1957, it was renamed Lernapat.

== History ==
The current territory of Lernapat has been part of different administrative formations at different times. According to the "Ashkarhatsoyts", the territory of Lernapat was located in the northern part of the Nig province of the Ayrarat province of Greater Armenia and bordered the Tashir province of the Gugark province. During the Bagratid dynasty, when Smbat II's brother Gurgen declared himself king and created the Kingdom of Lori, the territory of Lernapat became part of it. The Lori kingdom, weakened by the Seljuk-Turkish invasions, ceased to exist in 1113, and then became part of the Georgian kingdom, which was gaining strength during the reign of David the Builder. Later, this territory was part of the Mongols, Turkmen states, and then Eastern Georgia, under Persian rule. From 1723 to 1736, the area was part of the Tiflis Vilayet of the Ottoman Empire, then returned to Persia in 1736. In 1801, along with most of Georgia, it was annexed to the Russian Empire. The border between the Persian Yerevan Khanate and Russian Georgia ran through the Pambak Mountains. The Lernapat area was under Russian rule from 1840 to 1844 as part of the Georgian-Imereti region, and from 1844 to 1849 as part of the Tiflis province. In 1849, it was included in the Alexandropol province of the newly created Yerevan province. During the First Republic of Armenia, with the administrative division of 1919, Hajighara became part of the Gharakilisa province, and from May 1920, it became part of the Gharakilisa province of the Shirak province. During the Soviet era, it was part of the Gharakilisa region, from 1935 to 1964 it was part of the Kirovakan region, and then of the Gugark region. In 1995 it was included in the Lori region, and since 2021 it has been part of the enlarged Pambak community. Not much is known about the history of Lernapat, and the oldest known written sources refer to the 17th-18th centuries, but the village has been inhabited since the Bronze Age. It is possible that there was more than one settlement in the village. The Geological Museum of Lori Pambak has numerous archaeological finds from the Lernapat area. Traces of a Cyclopean fortress and fortress sites have been preserved. About 30 tombstones and khachkars[3] have been preserved in the Urut area of the village (these are tombs from approximately the 13th-14th centuries). In the territory of the new village there were remains of a 7th-century church, which was completely destroyed after the 1988 earthquake as a result of construction work. In 1723-1724, the Ottoman Empire occupied the territories of Eastern Georgia and Eastern Armenia, and in 1736, under the Treaty of Erzurum, they were returned to Persia. During that time, the Tiflis vilayet was established in the Georgian territories, which also included Hajiqaran. The tax list compiled by the Turks during that period has been preserved, which was studied in detail by G. A. Mirzabekyan. It shows that the Pambak province in the tax list of the Ottoman 1828 tax register[4] had 89 villages, of which the inhabitants of 36 fled from the Turks, the largest village in the province in terms of population was Karakilise (Gharakilisa, had 47 taxpayers and 26 households), the second was Zandar (36 taxpayers with a Muslim population), and the third was Hajiqaran (30 taxpayers, Christians[5]). The first immigration to Hajighara known to us was from Artsakh in 1725-1730, due to the Turkish invasions and the typhus epidemic that broke out there. Among the settlers of those years were the Kocharyans, Babayans, and Tadevosyans. The next migration from Artsakh to the Pambak region was in 1795-1801, due to the invasions of Agha Mohammad Khan Ghajar from Persia to Shushi, Yerevan, and Tiflis in 1795-1797. Among the settlers of those years were the Hakobjanyans, Yeghiazaryans, Kamalyans, and Papinyans. At the beginning of the 19th century, the population of the village increased significantly as a result of the Russo-Persian wars of 1826-1828 and the Russo-Turkish wars of 1828-1829, with the arrival of people from Persia (from the Salmast region) and Western Armenia (Bayezid and from the Alashkert regions) due to resettlement. The Voskanyans, Hakobyans, Avetisyans, Ashrafyans came from Salmast (according to another version, they came in the 1790s). A list of the inhabitants of Hajighara compiled by the Armenian Apostolic Church in 1859[6] by faith has been preserved, which includes about 290 men and 250 women of the Enlightenment faith and about 10 residents of the Protestant faith (in 1859, the population increased by about 400 people compared to 1831). At that time, the St. John's Basilica Church, built in the 17th-18th centuries, operated in the village, which needed renovation and was completely renovated with funds raised by the Armenian Church and the villagers[7] (the work was completed in 1866-1868)[8]. In 1868, the writer Perch Proshyan passed through the village and, noticing the absence of a school, founded a parish school in Hajighara, attached to the church, for some time he personally taught and later supported the school in various ways. The village cemetery is located next to the church, where the oldest tombstones date back to the mid-19th century. Currently, the area from the cemetery to the church was also a cemetery, but during the Soviet years, houses were built on that area, and the tombstones were used as building material. During the Soviet years, the church bell tower was also demolished and used as a warehouse. The church was greatly damaged by the 1988 earthquake and is now out of service. The fighting in the Battle of Gharakilisa during the May Heroic Wars of 1918 took place in the areas of Hajighara, Darpas, Bazum, and Ghshlagh (Taron). The people of Hajighara fought heroically in that battle, which is written about in the works of various researchers. A large khachkar is installed in the center of the village in memory of the people of Hajighara who participated in that battle. During the Soviet years, Hajighara became a collective farm, then a state farm. Wealthy villagers were dispossessed, some were subjected to repression, there were exiles and innocent people from the village. During the Great Patriotic War, 247 people were drafted into the army from the village, of which 146[9] did not return. In 1971, a monument to the victims of the Great Patriotic War was built in Lernapat. During the Soviet years, the village had a permanent kindergarten, which was moved from place to place several times. The school was located in a one-story black stone building. In 1970, the new school began to operate. The hospital was relocated to the former school building. Around 1940, a cheese factory was established in the village, the founder and first chief foreman of which was Ivan Aleksandr Seryogin, who had moved to Armenia from Saratov. The first floor of the cultural center also housed the post office and a sewing workshop. Lernapat was severely damaged by the Spitak earthquake of December 7, 1988. The village was completely destroyed, killing 114 people.[10] Before the disaster, Lernapat had a three-story secondary school with 500 students, a newly built two-story kindergarten, a hospital, a cultural center, a library, a cafeteria, a dairy factory, a household center, a pharmacy, and shops. About 500 apartments and other structures collapsed or became dilapidated. The school was moved to the Russian city of Gilinjik before a wooden schoolhouse was built in the village. In 1998, the school was moved to a two-story tin-roofed building of a former garment factory that was no longer in operation, and in 2007, to a newly built building. The people of Lernapat took a major part in the 1st, 2nd, and 2016 Four-Day Wars of Artsakh. In the First Artsakh War, conscript Armen Zhoray Tumanyan from Lernapat was killed in 1992, and in the 44-day war of 2020, conscripts Artak Ararat Hakobjanyan and Gor Arshaluys Abazyan were killed. The Lernapat Senior Citizens' Dance Group has toured various cities in Armenia and the USSR with its concerts. The current kindergarten building was inaugurated on September 22, 2016.

== Population ==
According to the results of the RA 2011 census, the permanent population of Lernapat was 1,661, the existing population was 1,511 people, the population change over time is shown below.

== Demographics ==
Historical population
Year	Pop.	±% p.a.
1831	143	—
1897	1,253	+3.34%
1926	1,457	+0.52%
1939	1,680	+1.10%
1959	1,462	−0.69%
1970	1,748	+1.64%
1979	1,727	−0.13%
2001	2,030	+0.74%
2004	1,789	−4.13%
2011	1,661	−1.05%

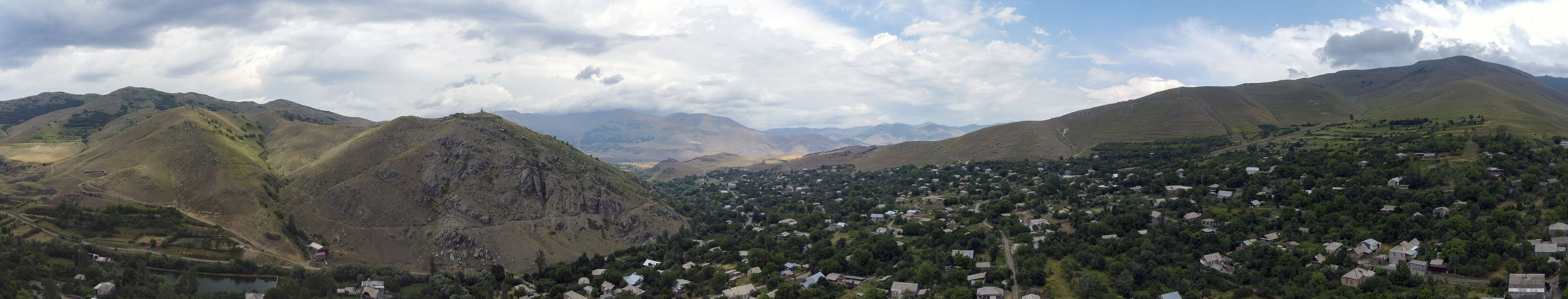
A panorama of Lernapat village, Armenia.

== Economy ==
The population is engaged in animal husbandry, cultivation of grains, fodder crops and fruits and vegetables.

Livestock breeders produce milk, meat, wool, and eggs. Beekeeping is developing successfully.

== Famous people ==
Vladimir Nerkararyan (1914-1994), Armenian Soviet historian, doctor of historical sciences (1969), professor (1971) [19], Zarmair Ashrafyan (1898-1936), Armenian and Ukrainian state and party worker, lawyer, prosecutor of the Soviet Socialist Republic of Armenia (1927-1929), Misak Ter-Gevorgyan (1882-1968), a participant in the Soviet revolutionary movements in the South Caucasus.

== Historical and cultural monuments ==
There is a basilica church built in 1862 in the village, which is in a state of emergency. There is also a memorial to the victims of the Patriotic War, khachkars dedicated to the memory of the victims of the Armenian Genocide, the Battle of Gharakilisa and the 1988 earthquake. There are the remains of the Cyclopean era fortress, the remains of the BC fortress, a mausoleum, as well as an underground passage, as well as rock-cut khachkars.

== Yervand Dallakyan secondary school in Lernapat ==
On July 29, 1993, by the decision of the session of the Gugark regional council, Lernapat secondary school was named after pedagogue Yervand Mekhaki Dallakyan (1928-1978). On September 18, 1993, the naming ceremony of the educational center took place.

The current building of the school was commissioned in 2007.

== UAV center named after Karen Vardanyan ==
In 2021, an airfield for drones was built in Lernapat, named after Karen Vardanyan. The runway of the airport, which is more than a hundred meters long, is built with special technologies and has 7 layers of different pebbles and sand, which provides a softer landing for UAVs. On September 18, 2021, the "Hayk 2021" competition was held, in which about three dozen teams participated in three nominations: school, amateur and specialized. The competition has become annual and is held in September.

== Gallery ==
Lernapat village from above

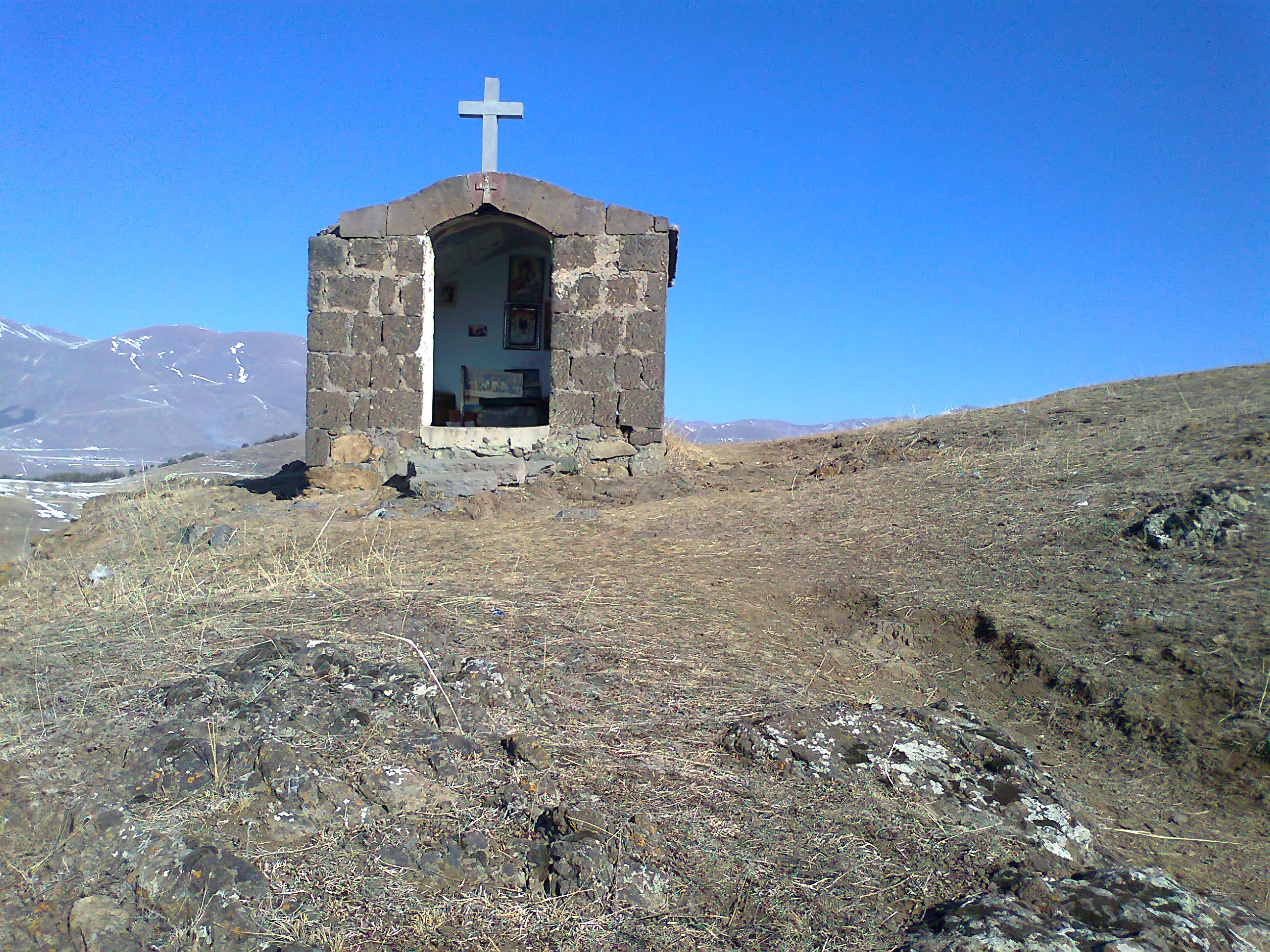
Saint Nshan chapel (before April 2014)

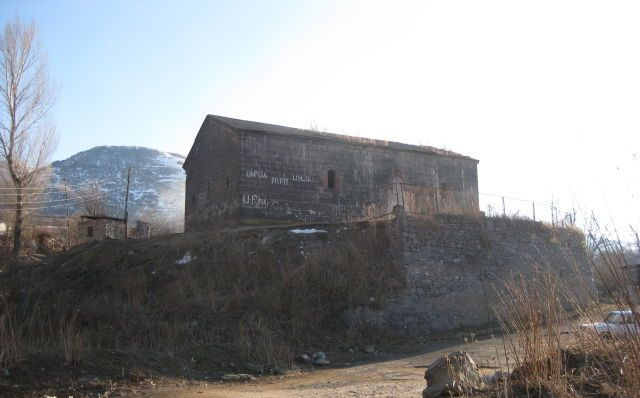
Lernapat church (19th century)

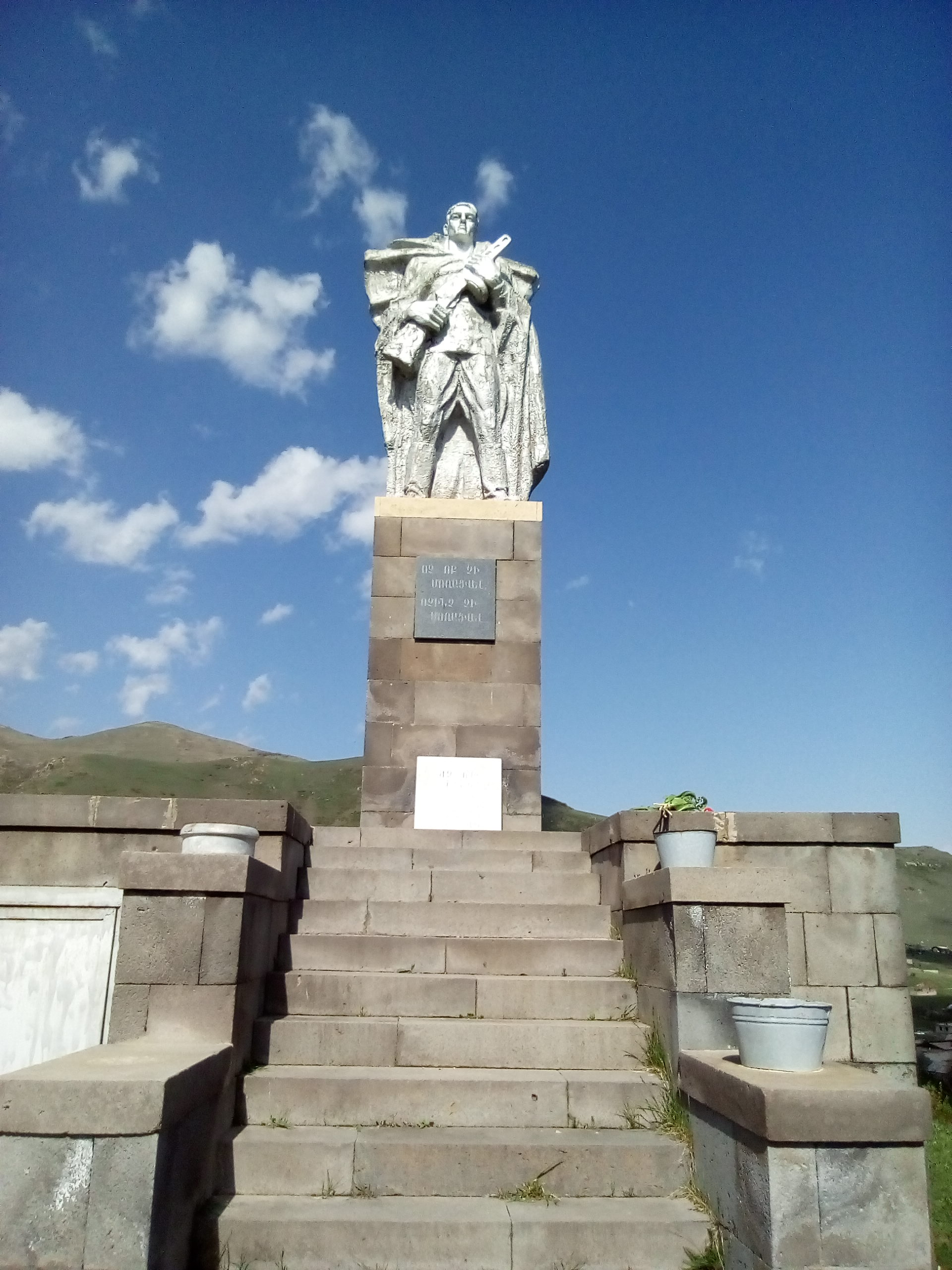
Monument to those who fell in the 1941-1945 Great Patriotic War

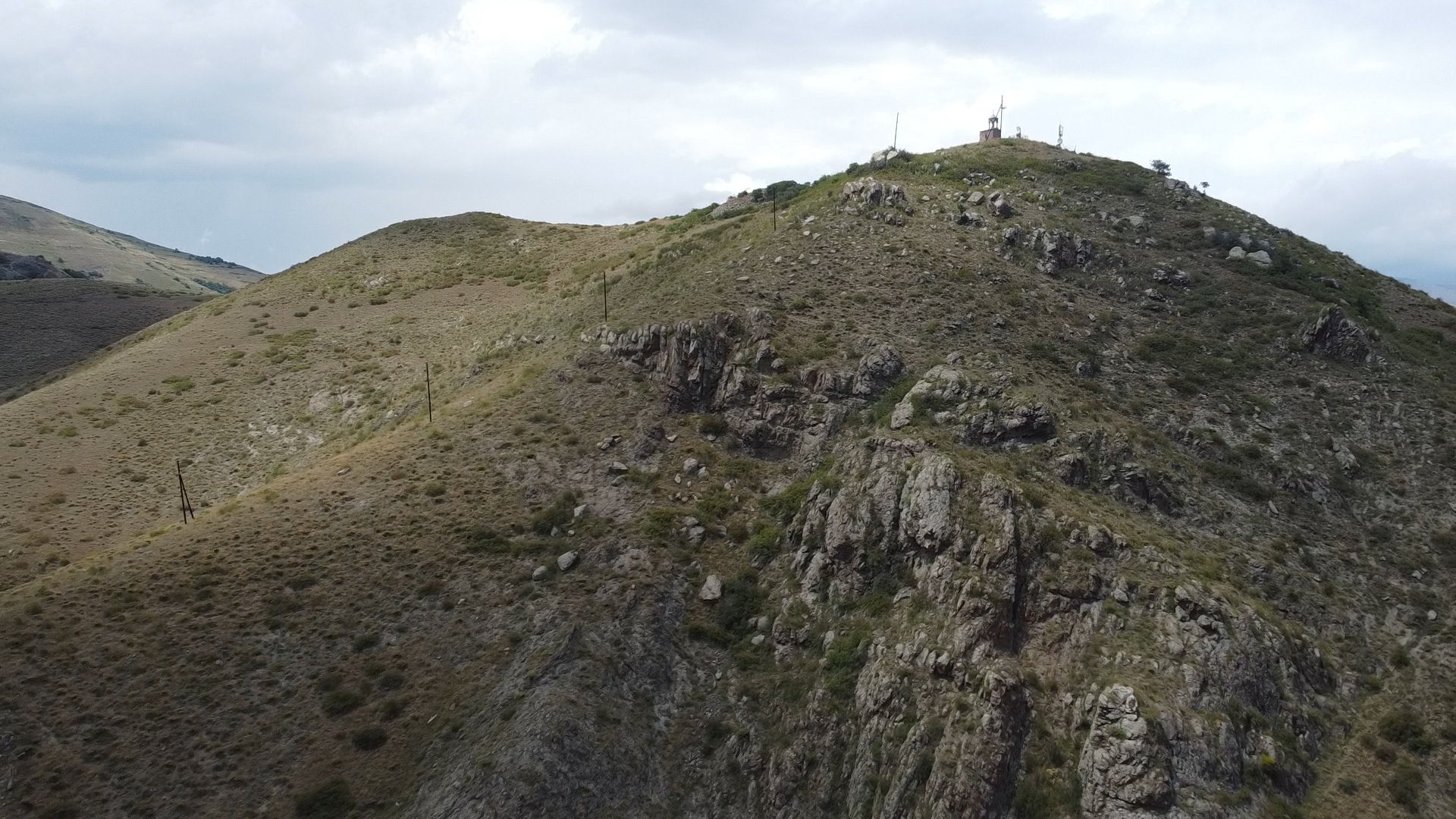
Gabriel-Munkel height and Saint Gabriel chapel

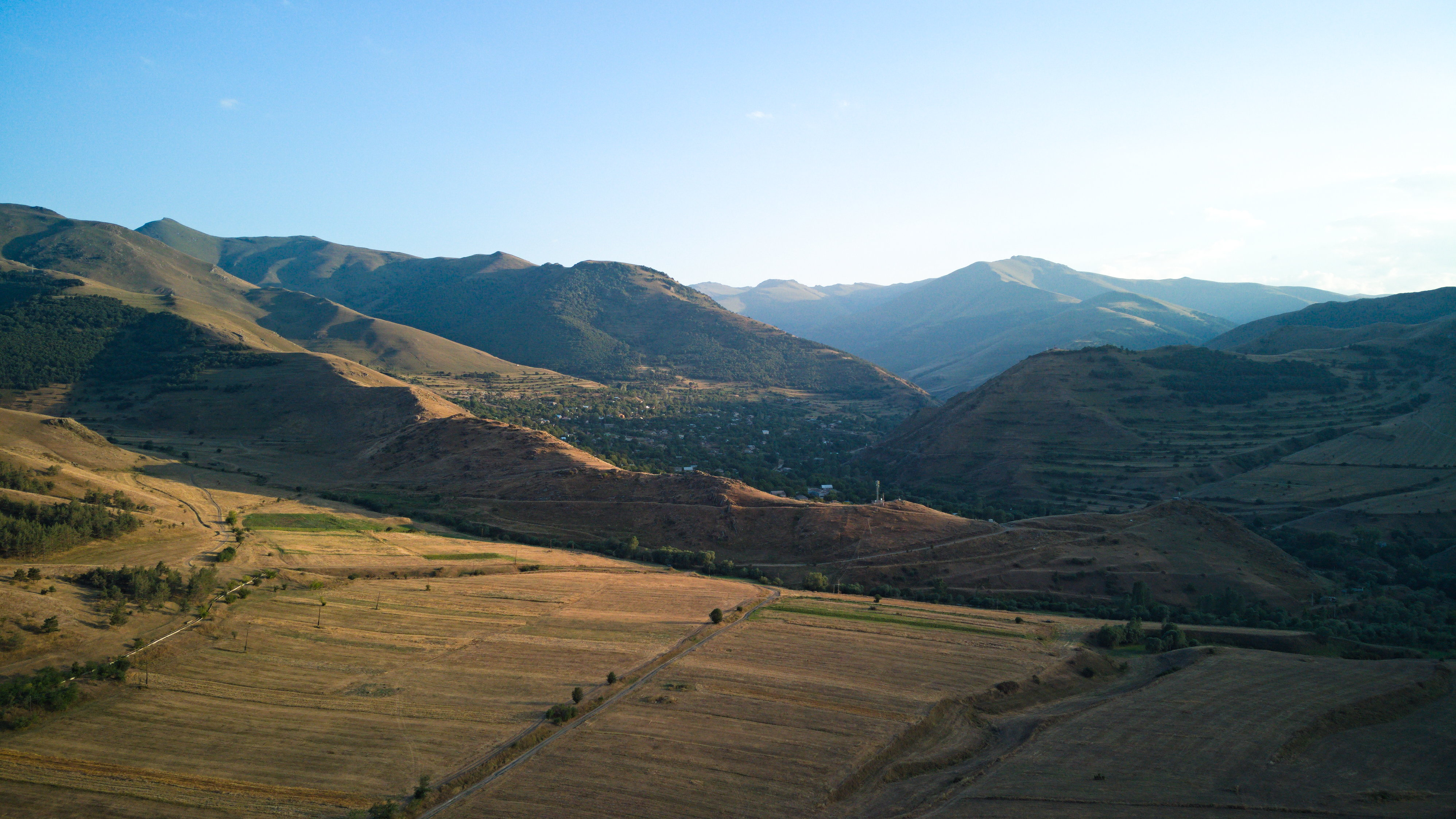
Lernapat, aerial view
