= Kapan =

City in Syunik, Armenia

Kapan Կապան
- Town
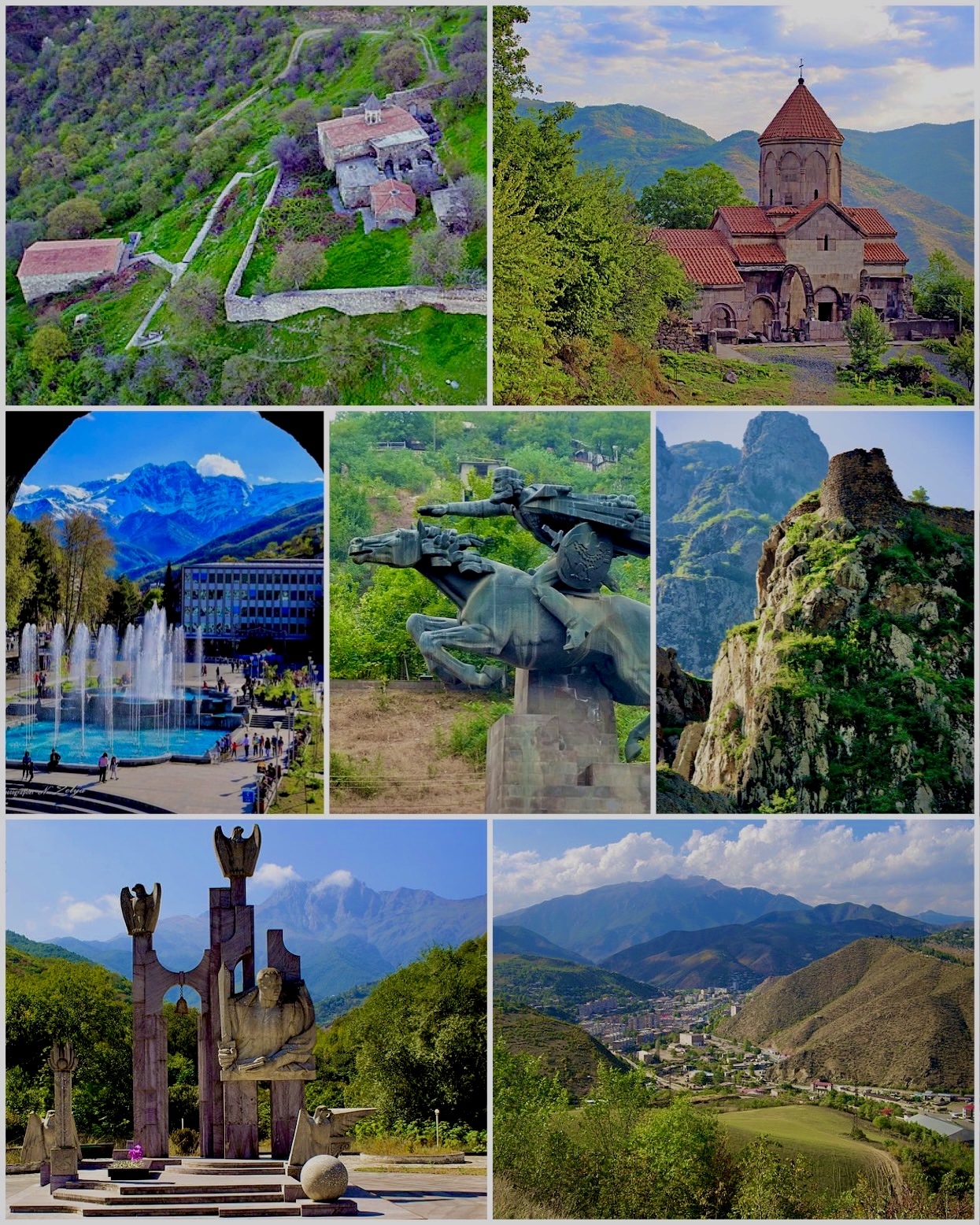
- From top left: Halidzor Fortress; Vahanavank; Mount Khustup and Kapan downtown; Monument to David Bek; Baghaberd; Garegin Nzhdeh's memorial; Kapan skyline

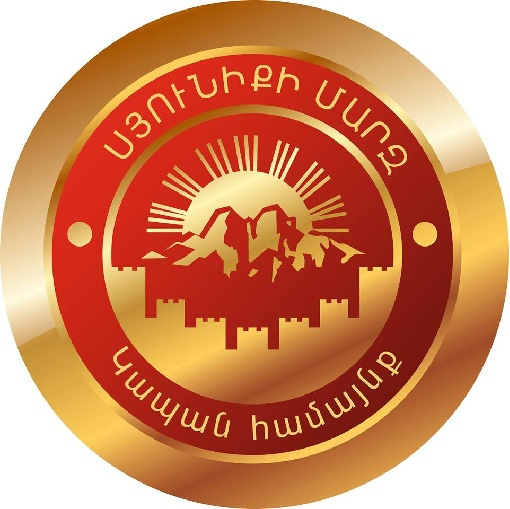
- Seal

- Location within Armenia Location within Syunik Province
- Coordinates: 39°12′04″N 46°24′54″E
- Country: Armenia
- Province: Syunik
- Municipality: Kapan
- First mentioned: 5th century
- City status: 1938

Government
  - Mayor: Gevorg Parsyan

Area
  - Total: 36 km^{2} (14 sq mi)
- Elevation: 910 m (2,990 ft)

Population (2022 census)
  - Total: 32,780
  - Density: 910/km^{2} (2,400/sq mi)
- Time zone: UTC+4 (AMT)
- Postal code: 3301-3308
- Area code: (+374) 285
- Website: Official website

Kapan (Armenian: Կապան [kɑˈpɑn]) is a town in southeast Armenia, serving as the administrative centre of the Kapan Municipality and also as the provincial capital of Syunik Province. It is located in the valley of the Voghji River and near the border of Azerbaijan, and is on the northern slopes of Mount Khustup. Kapan is the most populous town in the Syunik Province as well as the entire region of southern Armenia. According to the 2011 census, the population of Kapan was 43,190, a slight decline from 45,711 in the 2001 census. According to the 2022 census, the current population of the town is around 32,780.

== Etymology ==
The name Kapan derives from the Classical Armenian common noun kapan (կապան), meaning 'mountain pass' (related to the verb kapel 'to tie'). In later centuries, the name evolved into Ghap’an (Ղափան), which was in use until 1991, when the older form of the name was restored.

== History ==
=== Ancient history and Middle Ages ===
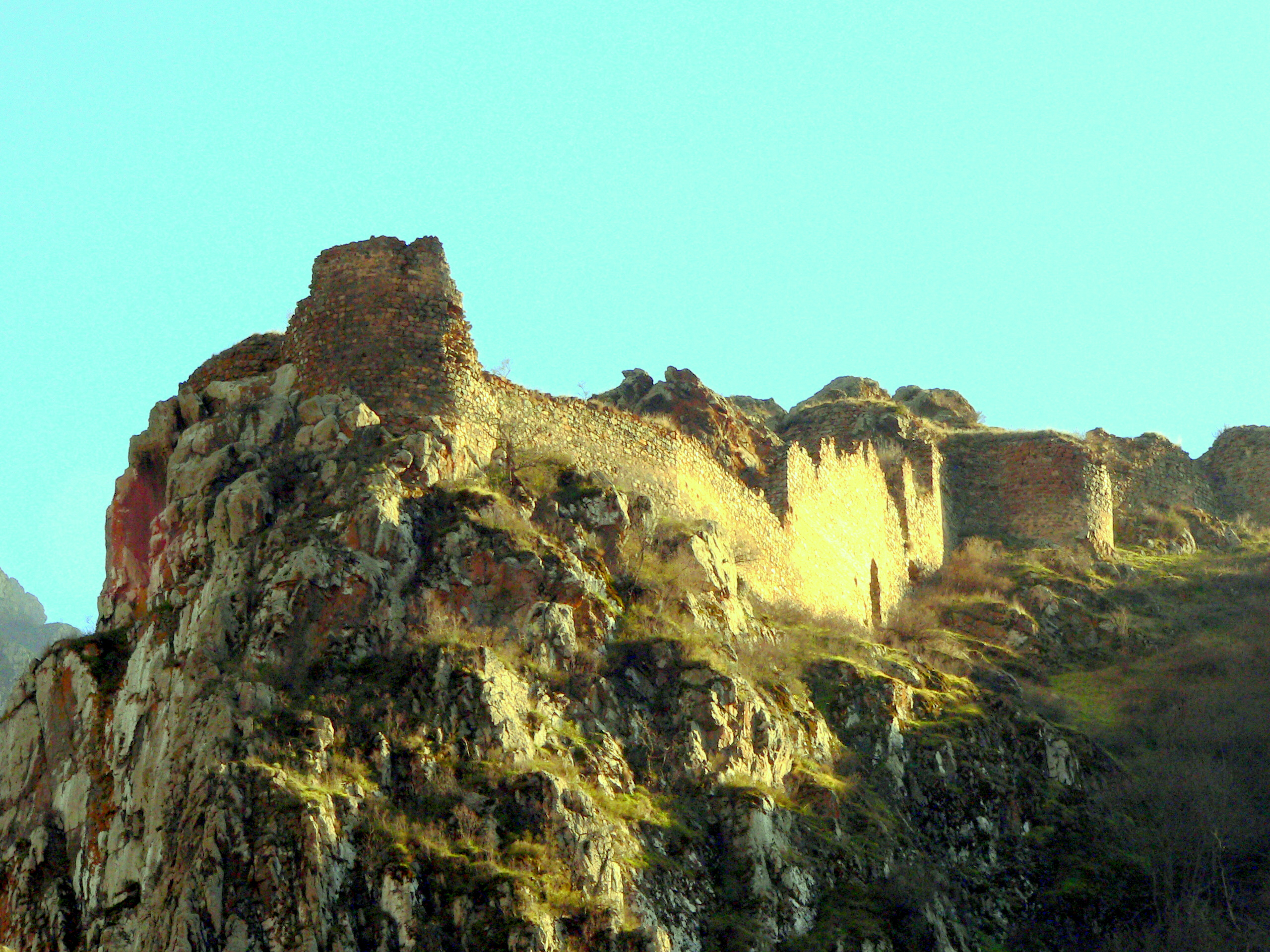
The remains of the 4th-century Baghaberd fortress near Kapan

The area of modern-day Kapan was first mentioned in the 5th century as a small settlement within the properties of the Siunia dynasty. Historically, it was part of the Baghk’ canton of Syunik, the ninth province of the historic Greater Armenia. Though originally a small settlement, by the late 9th and early 10th century, it was fortified by Prince Dzagik, becoming the residence of the Dzagikian princes. By the end of the 10th century, the ruler of Syunik, Prince Smbat II, moved to the town of Kapan and founded the Kingdom of Syunik, proclaiming himself a king under the protectorate of the Bagratid Kingdom of Armenia. As the capital of the Kingdom of Syunik, Kapan flourished throughout the 11th century, reaching around 20 thousand inhabitants, composed of mostly Armenians with a prominent Jewish minority, and being a center of trades, crafts, and metallurgy.

In 1103, Kapan was entirely ruined by the Seljuk invaders. The medieval Armenian historian Stephen Orbelian of Syunik states that the Seljuks began massacring from the Jewish quarter of Kapan. After the fall of the Kingdom of Syunik in 1170, Syunik and the rest of the historic territories of Armenia suffered from the Seljuk, Mongol, Aq Qoyunlu and Kara Koyunlu invasions, in that order, between the 12th and 15th centuries.

=== Iranian rule ===
At the beginning of the 16th century, Kapan became part of the Erivan Province within the Safavid Iran. In 1722, the Armenian principality of Kapan was established by uniting the noble families of Syunik into one state in order to fight against Muslim oppression. By the beginning of the 18th century, Kapan was associated with the Armenian military leader David Bek, who led the liberation campaign of the Armenians of Syunik against the Iranians and the invading Ottoman Turks. David Bek started his battles in 1722 with the help of thousands of local Armenians, including Avan Yuzbashi and Mkhitar Sparapet, taking control of Syunik. The centre of Bek's struggle was the Baghaberd Fortress northwest of Kapan and the Halidzor Fortress southwest of Kapan, where he died in 1728. In 1747, Kapan was incorporated into the Nakhichevan Khanate and by 1750, Kapan became part of the newly formed Karabakh Khanate. It was turned into a significant urban settlement during Qajar Iranian rule by the end of the 18th century.

=== Russian rule ===
In 1813, the territory of historic Syunik, including the region of Kapan, officially became part of the Russian Empire as a result of the Russo-Persian War of 1804–13 and the following Treaty of Gulistan signed between Russia and Iran. In 1828–30, many Armenian families from the Iranian cities of Khoy and Salmast migrated to the region. In 1868, it became part of the Zangezur uezd within the Elizavetpol Governorate of the Russian Empire. By the last quarter of the 19th century, Kapan formed an important urban community for the region as a result of merging several villages together.

=== Modern history ===
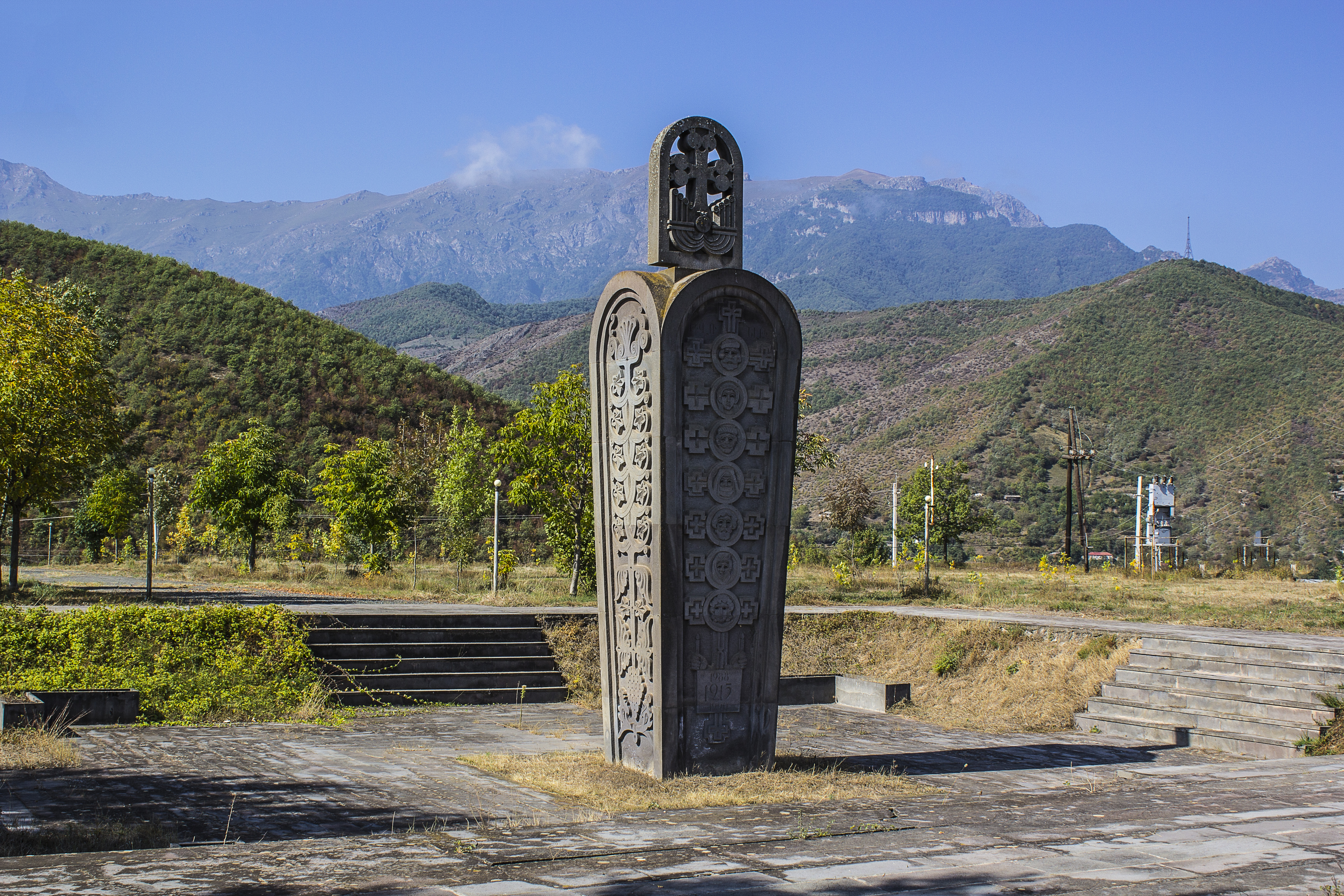
Armenian Genocide memorial

Both the Republic of Armenia and the Azerbaijan Democratic Republic claimed Kapan between 1918 and 1920. As a result of the sovietisation of Armenia in December 1920, Kapan was included in the Republic of Mountainous Armenia under the commandment of Garegin Nzhdeh, who fought against the Bolsheviks between 26 April and 12 July 1921. After the Soviet Red Army entered the Zangezur region in July 1921, Kapan, along with the towns of Goris, Sisian and Meghri, fell under the Soviet rule, where it was administered as part of the Armenian SSR.

In September 1930, the Kafan raion was formed with Kapan as its administrative center. In 1938, Kapan received city status. A major mining and industrial centre in Soviet Armenia, the city was known as Kafan in Russian and Ghap’an in Armenian until 1991. During Nikita Khrushchev's Thaw, Kapan was visited by Anastas Mikoyan, who advised Soviet Armenian officials on economic development projects in and around the city.

Following the independence of Armenia in 1991, Kapan became the centre of the newly formed Syunik Province as per the 1995 administrative reforms of the republic. During the First Nagorno-Karabakh War, the city was bombarded by artillery coming from the neighboring Zangilan District of Azerbaijan, causing deaths among the civilian population. This prompted an Armenian operation to capture several nearby Azerbaijani border villages in December 1992.

== Geography and climate ==
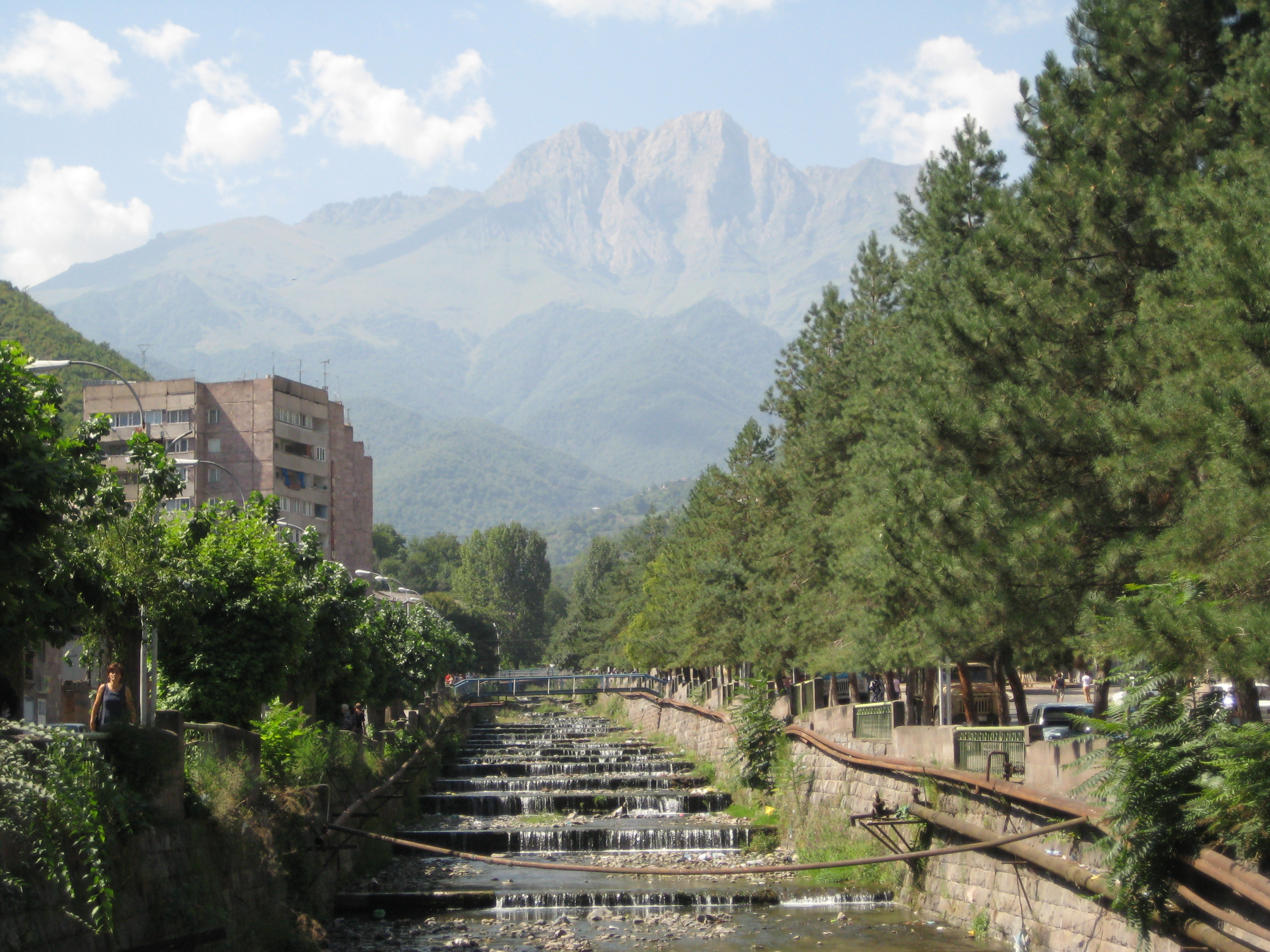
Mount Khustup overlooking the town

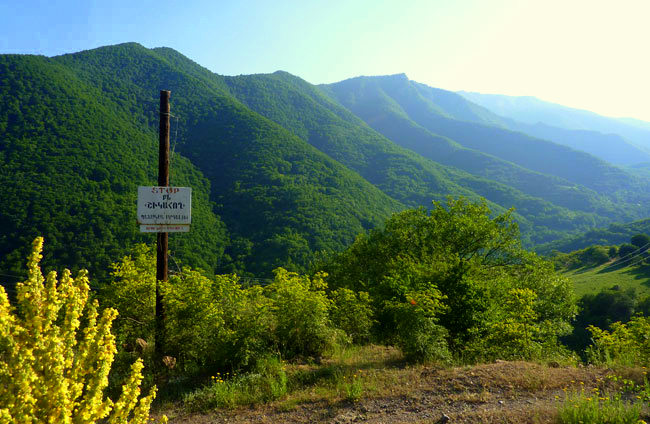
Shikahogh state reserve

Kapan is the largest town in the Syunik province as well as the entire region of southern Armenia. It is located in the eastern part of Syunik, within the narrow valley of the Voghji River with a length of 13 km (8 mi) from the east to the west, at the southeastern slopes of the Zangezur Mountains, between the Bargushat and Meghri ridges.

The town is about 80 km (50 mi) north of the Iranian border. With a height of 3201 meters, Mount Khustup is the highest peak of the region. The elevation of Kapan is 750–1050 meters above sea level, with an average height of 910 meters. Two tributaries of the Voghji River, Vachagan and Kavart, flow through the town.

Kapan has a humid continental climate (Köppen Dfb) with very warm summers and cold winters. Temperatures can reach up to 38 °C (100 °F) during summer, and can fall to −15 °C (5 °F) during winter.

The Shikahogh State Preserve, founded in 1958, is located around 14 km (9 mi) south of Kapan, near the Shikahogh village. The preserve is home to about 1,100 species of plants, 70 of which have been registered in the Red Book of Armenia. The fauna of Shikahogh has not been fully explored, but studies have revealed rare species of animals such as leopard, wild goat, bear, viper, and hedgehog.

Climate data for Kapan
Month	Jan	Feb	Mar	Apr	May	Jun	Jul	Aug	Sep	Oct	Nov	Dec	Year
Mean daily maximum °C (°F)	7.1 (44.8)	8.4 (47.1)	11.7 (53.1)	17.1 (62.8)	21.8 (71.2)	25.8 (78.4)	29.3 (84.7)	29.3 (84.7)	24.4 (75.9)	19.8 (67.6)	13.1 (55.6)	9.0 (48.2)	18.1 (64.5)
Daily mean °C (°F)	−3.0 (26.6)	−1.8 (28.8)	1.9 (35.4)	8.1 (46.6)	12.9 (55.2)	16.9 (62.4)	20.2 (68.4)	20.2 (68.4)	15.7 (60.3)	10.4 (50.7)	3.6 (38.5)	−0.5 (31.1)	8.7 (47.7)
Mean daily minimum °C (°F)	−13.0 (8.6)	−12.0 (10.4)	−8.0 (17.6)	−1.0 (30.2)	4.0 (39.2)	8.0 (46.4)	11.0 (51.8)	11.0 (51.8)	7.0 (44.6)	1.0 (33.8)	−6.0 (21.2)	−10.0 (14.0)	−0.7 (30.8)
Average precipitation mm (inches)	28 (1.1)	32 (1.3)	60 (2.4)	80 (3.1)	96 (3.8)	68 (2.7)	31 (1.2)	30 (1.2)	43 (1.7)	55 (2.2)	40 (1.6)	27 (1.1)	590 (23.4)
Source: WMO

== Demographics ==
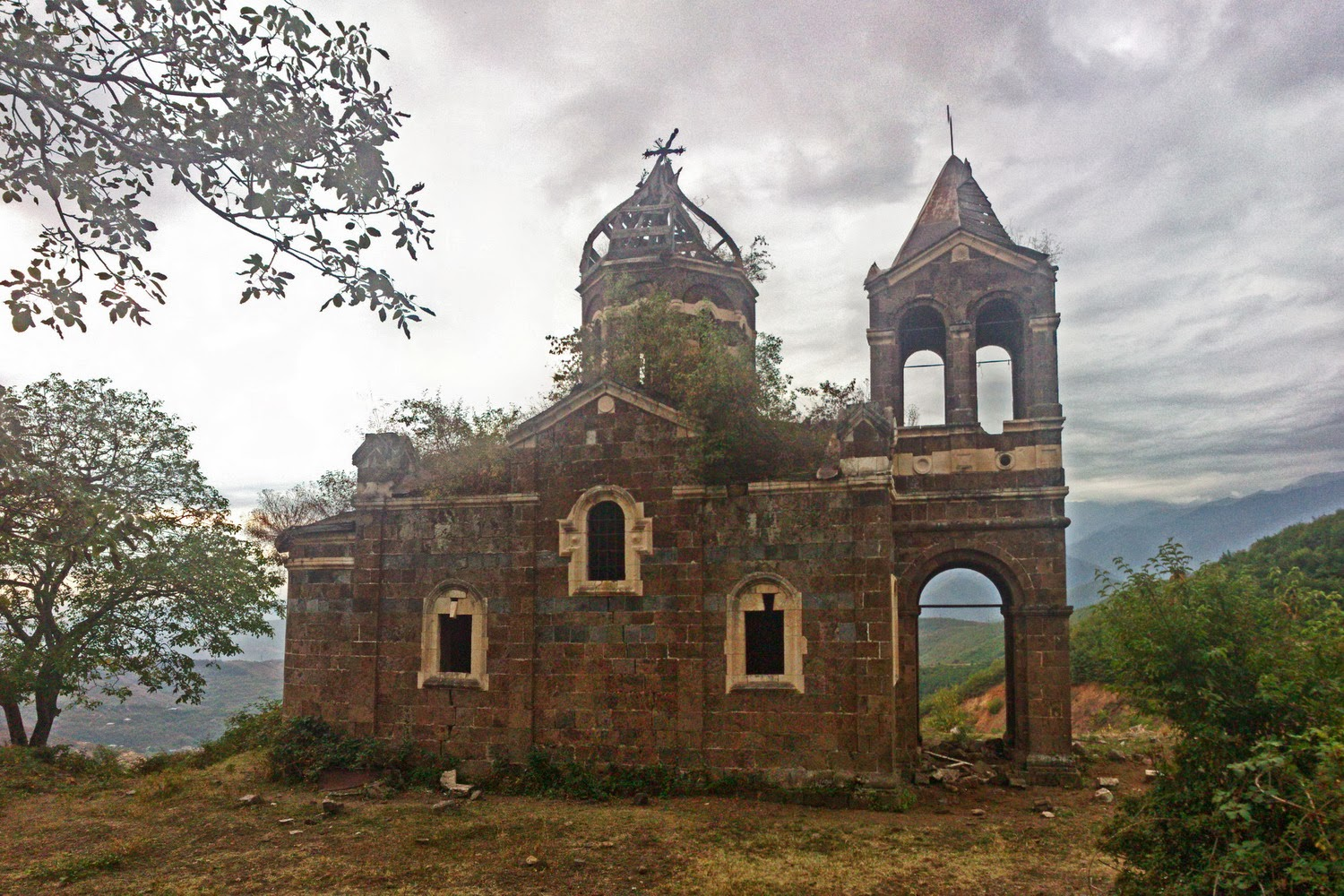
Saint Catherine Greek Orthodox church of Kapan

Kapan is a major historic centre of the Armenian civilization within historic Syunik. A sizable Jewish community lived in its own quarter in Kapan during the Middle Ages.

During the first half of the 19th century, many Russian and German engineers and workers arrived in Kapan to work in the copper mines of the region. In 1850, Greek specialists also arrived in the town. The Greeks built the Saint Catherine Orthodox church near Kapan in 1865.

The population of Kapan was at its peak with 45,711 citizens as per the 2001 census. However, the population has greatly declined during the first decade of the 21st century to 34,600 as per the 2016 official estimate.

Currently, Kapan is almost entirely populated by ethnic Armenians who belong to the Armenian Apostolic Church. The town's Saint Mesrop Mashtots Church opened in December 2001 and is regulated by the Diocese of Syunik of the Armenian Apostolic Church, based in the nearby town of Goris.

Historical population
Year	Pop.	±% p.a.
1831	196	—
1897	2,272	+3.78%
1926	2,658	+0.54%
1939	8,511	+9.37%
1959	19,315	+4.18%
1976	36,351	+3.79%
2001	45,711	+0.92%
2011	43,190	−0.57%
2022	32,780	−2.48%

The town is served by the Kapan Medical Center, which was fully modernized in 2015.

== Culture ==
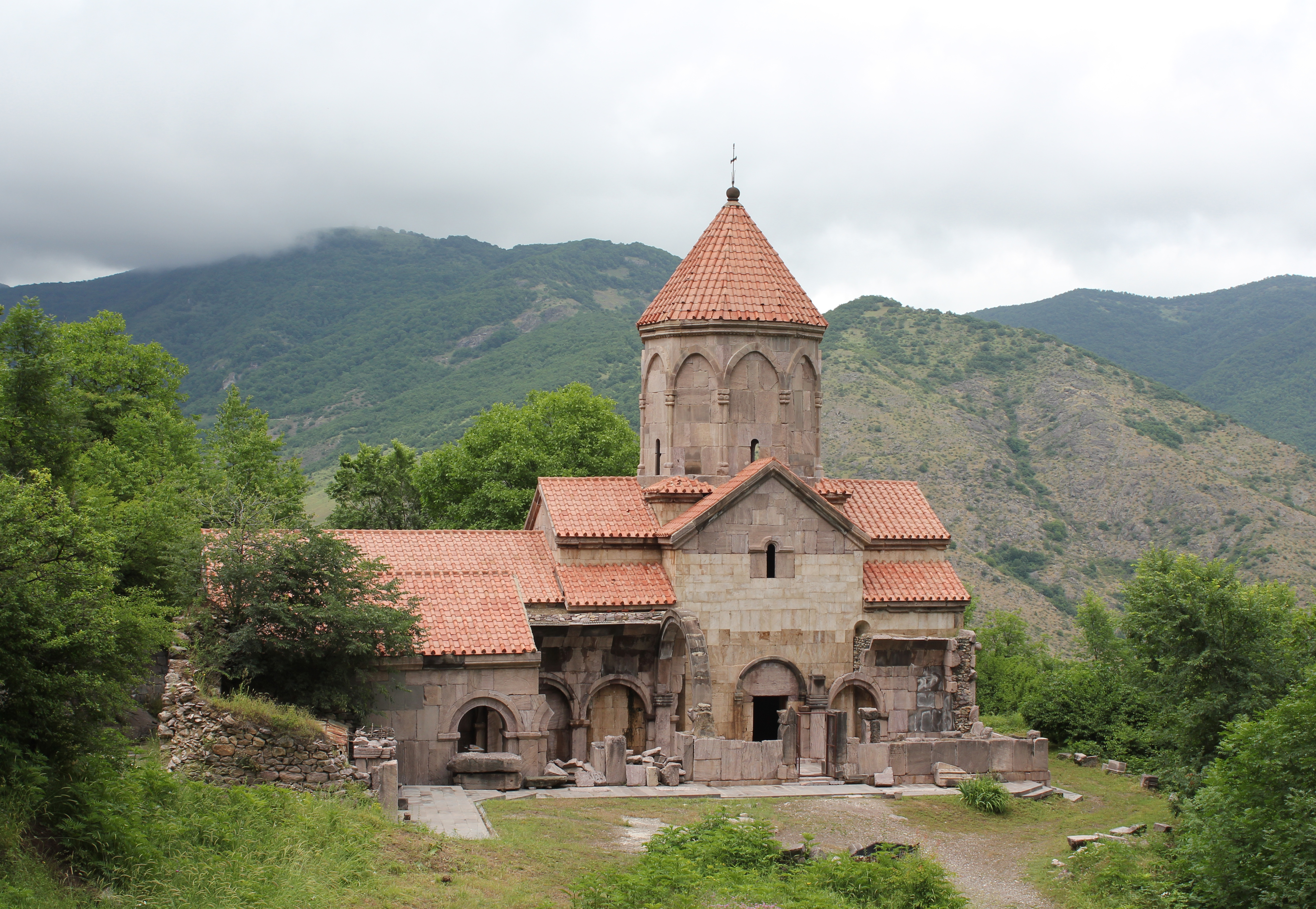
Vahanavank Monastery

The historic part of Kapan is located around 10 km (6 mi) km west of the modern-day town. As one of the historic settlements of Armenia, Kapan and the surrounding areas are home to many heritage monuments of Armenian architecture, including:

- Baghaberd Fortress of the 4th century, also known as the castle of Davit Bek.
- The medieval bridge of Kapan dating back to 871.
- Tatev Monastery of the 9th century, founded in the place of an ancient tabernacle well known in ancient times.
- Vahanavank Monastery of the 11th century.
- Halidzor Fortress of the 17th century.

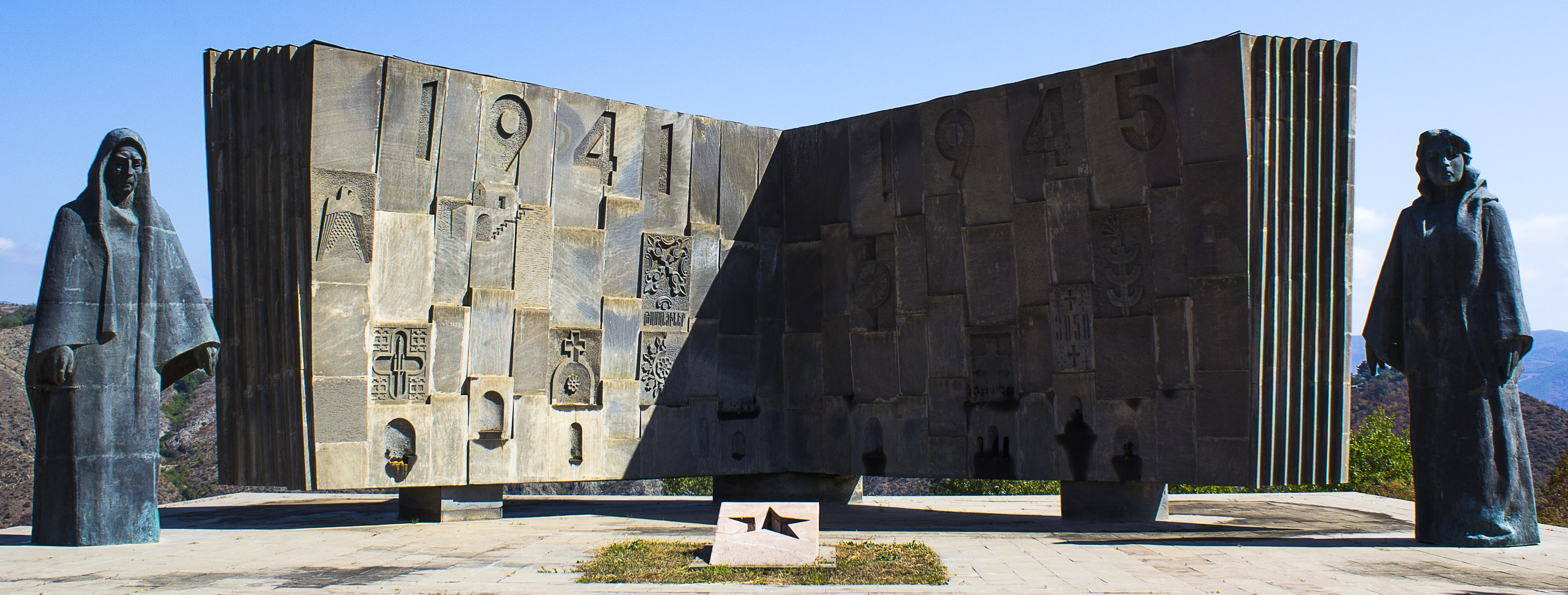
World War II memorial in Kapan

The town has several statues of prominent Armenian patriotic figures, such as the equestrian statue of Davit Bek erected in 1983, and Garegin Nzhdeh's memorial opened in 2001. Other decorative statues in the town include the bear statue of Kajaran's Key erected in 1966, the statue of the Girl from Zangezur erected in 1978, the World War II memorial opened in 1987, and the memorial to Armenian genocide erected in 1988.

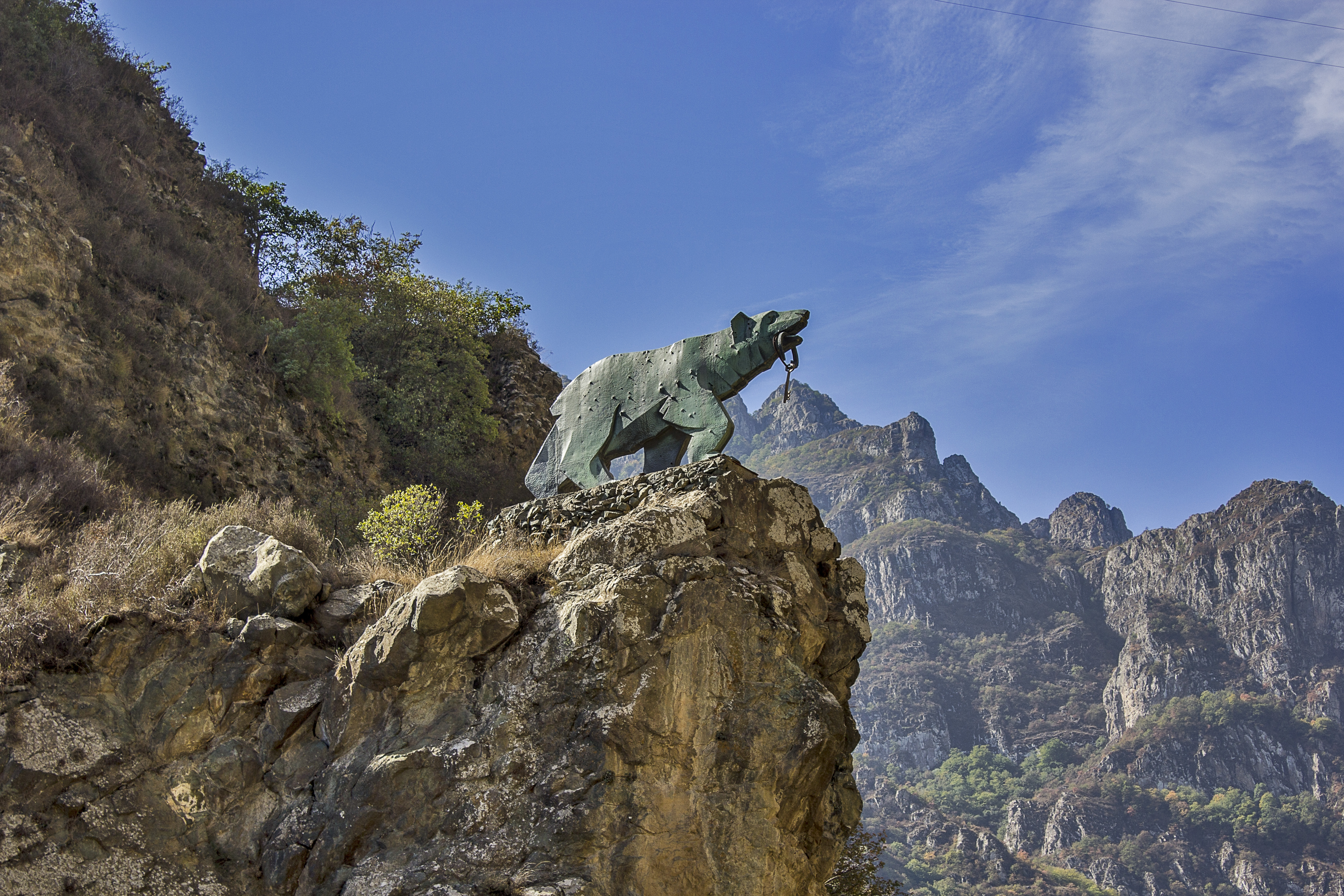
The bear statue of Kajaran's Key

Currently, the town is home to the Kapan Museum of Geology and the Kapan history museum named after Shmavon Movsisyan. Other cultural institutions of Kapan include the Children's School of Fine Arts opened in 1972, the House of Culture opened in 1977, the Children's School of Arts opened in 1981, the public library, the children's and youth creativity centre opened in 1990, the Alexander Shirvanzade drama theatre of Kapan, as well as two schools of music, which opened in 1977 and 1986. A branch of the Modern Art Museum of Yerevan is also operating in Kapan.

The Wings of Tatev cableway connecting Halidzor village with the Tatev Monastery is located 24 km (15 mi) north of Kapan. It is the longest reversible aerial tramway built in one section only.

=== Media ===
Kapan has two local TV companies: Khustup TV and Sosi TV. Khustup TV was founded in 2004 and covers the entire region of Syunik. Sosi TV was founded in 2012 and covers the central and southern parts of Syunik.

== Transportation ==
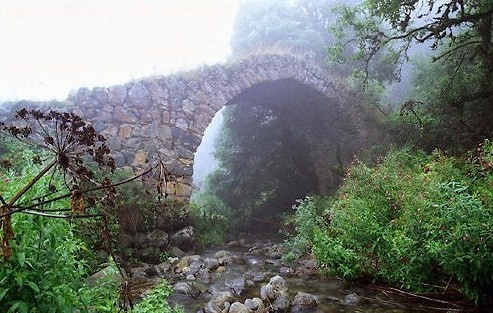
A medieval bridge in Kapan dating back to 871

The M-2 main road that connects the capital Yerevan with southern Armenia and the Iranian border passes through Kapan. Prior to the First Nagorno-Karabakh War, the nearby airport accommodated the YAK-40 and AN-14 cargo aircraft. In February 2017, the governor of Syunik Province, Vahe Hakobyan, announced that the airfield would become a modern airport serving the town of Kapan and southern Armenia, and on June 6 a test landing was conducted at the airfield with the governor on board. According to the plan, the reconstruction of Kapan Airport was expected to be completed in 2018, with an estimated cost of US$2 million. The airport was reopened in 2023 and operates flights between the town and the capital city of Yerevan, thus making Kapan the third city in Armenia with an operating airport after Yerevan and Gyumri.

== Economy ==
Kapan is struggling to cope with the realities of post-Karabakh war and post-Soviet society. However, there are signs of growth and development. Kapan is primarily a mining centre, hence its Qajar-era Persian name of Ma'dan, meaning 'mine'.

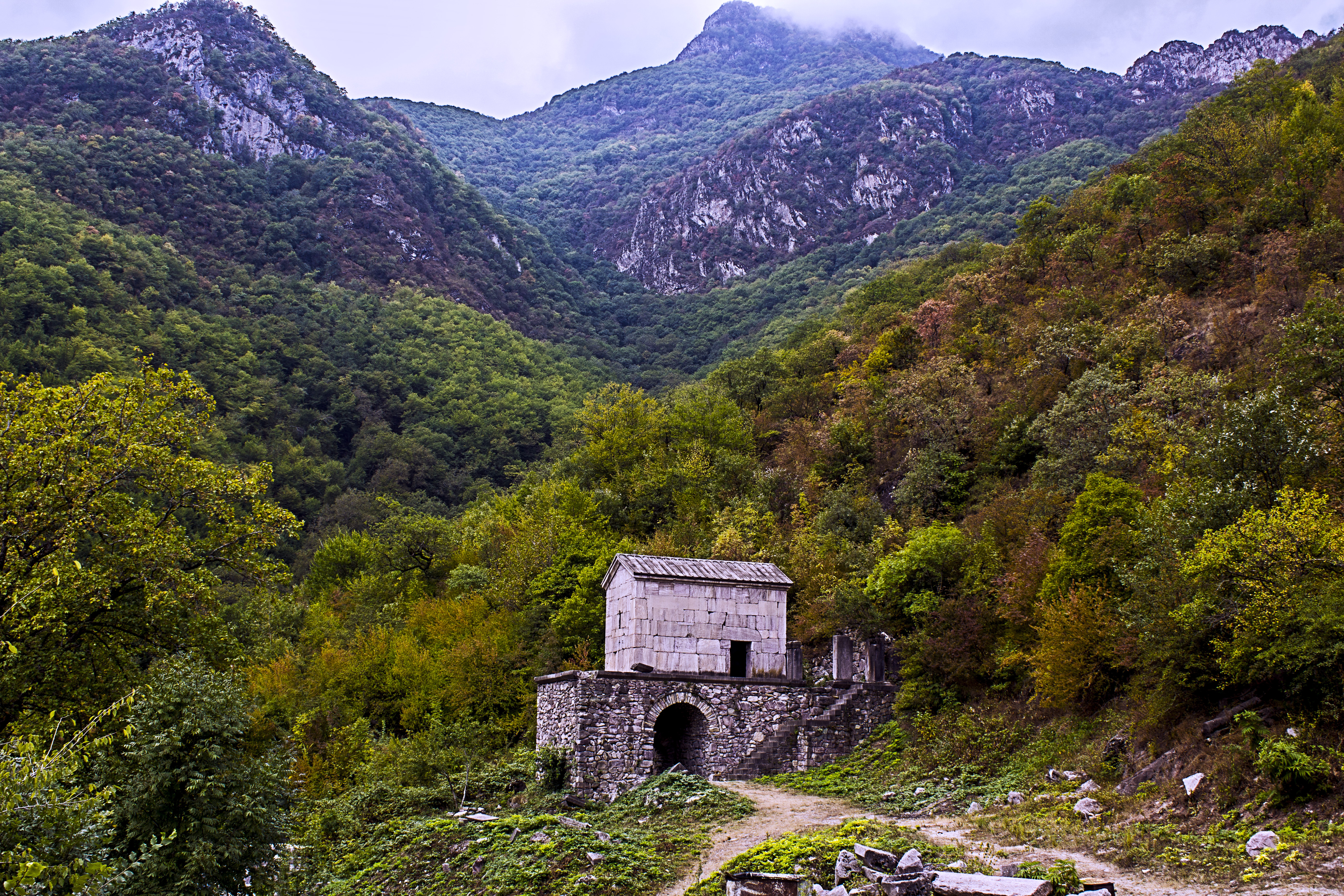
The Church of the Holy Mother of God, built in 1086, nestled among the mountains around Kapan

Kapan has been a major centre for the production of many non-ferrous metals. The Kapan mining company is currently owned by Chaarat, a British company. It is currently working the Shahumyan deposit and produces around 65,000 ounces of gold equivalent in copper and zinc concentrates per year.

Kapan is home to many industrial firms. The largest firms are Kapan CHSHSH for building materials founded in 1947, the Kapan machine tools plant founded in 1972, the Sonatex knitting factory founded in 1985, and Marila LLC for meat and dairy products founded in 2010.

Tourism is growing in the region of Kapan. The nearby Wings of Tatev aerial tramway connecting Halidzor village with Tatev Monastery has greatly contributed to the development of the tourism sector. Many hotels and mountain resorts are set to open in the near future, while the upcoming opening of the Syunik Airport of Kapan will increase tourist access. Ark Ecological NGO, headquartered in Kapan, has been working on the development of ecotourism in the Syunik region since 2013, and is currently building hiking trail infrastructure to connect Kapan and the Tatev Monastery.

== Education ==
The Kapan campus of the National Polytechnic University of Armenia is home to two faculties:

- Faculty of Technologies and Sectoral Economics,
- Faculty of Natural Sciences and Communication Systems.

== Sport ==
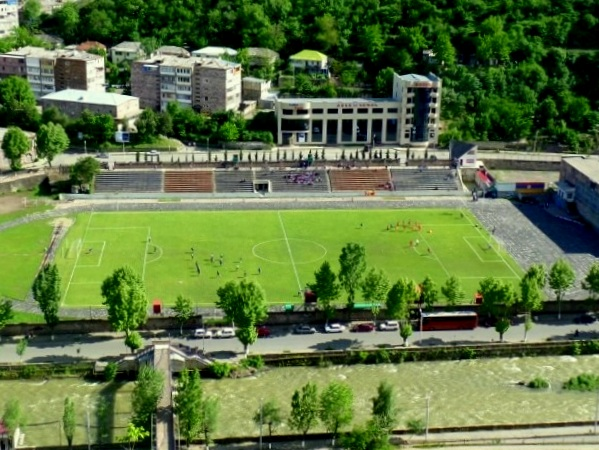
Kapan Stadium

Football is the most popular sport in Kapan. FC Gandzasar Kapan, founded in 2004, represented the town in the Armenian Premier League, playing their home games at Kapan Stadium. The club has won third place in the Armenian Premier League on three occasions: in 2008, 2011 and 2012–13. Gandzasar have the highest average attendance at home games in the league.

In May 2013, Gandzasar Kapan opened their football pitches, including one with artificial turf. The academy became the first developed technical football centre in the Syunik Province.

Kapan is also home to the Davit Hambardzumyan Children and Youth Sport School, operated by the municipality since its inauguration in 1969. More than 200 athletes are involved in the sport school. The Kapan Futsal Club is a professional futsal team based in Kapan, playing their home games at the Davit Hambardzumyan Children and Youth Sports School in the Armenian Futsal Premier League.

The Kapan Sport School of Artistic Gymnastics has been operating since 1977. Currently, about 170 young athletes attend there. In 1989, another sport school specializing in athletics was opened in the town, designated for around 100 young athletes.

== International relations ==
=== Consulates ===
In October 2022, Iran opened a consulate general in Kapan. In 2023, Russia and France announced plans to establish consulates in Kapan.

=== Twin towns – Sister cities ===
- Glendale, California, United States
- Borisov, Belarus
- Saint-Etienne, France
- Ningbo, China

== Notable people ==
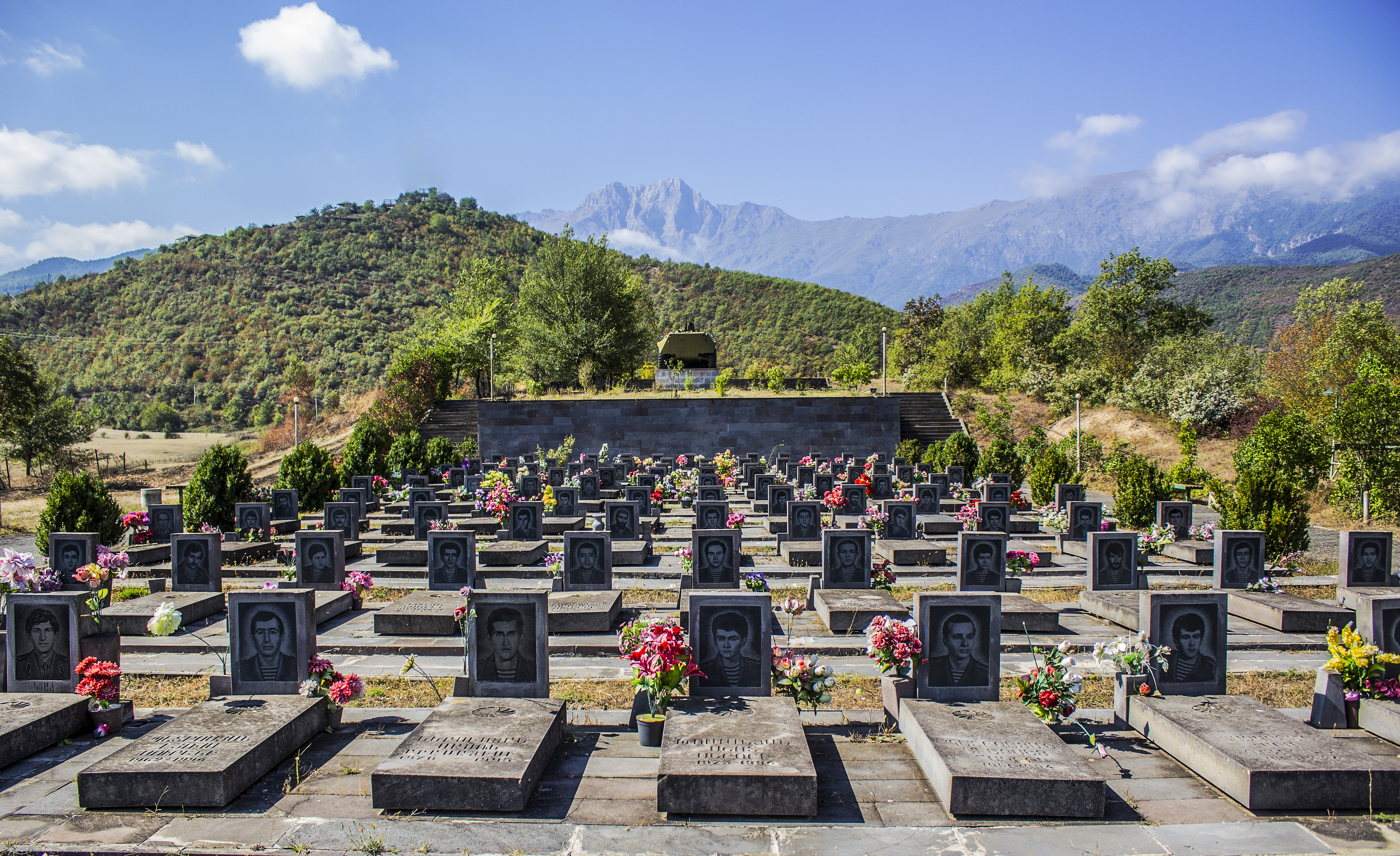
Nagorno-Karabakh conflict cemetery

- David Ambartsumyan, Soviet Armenian diver, European champion
- Tatoul Markarian, Armenian diplomat
- Armen Movsisyan, former Minister of Energy of Armenia
- Karen Sargsyan, principal choirmaster of the Armenian Opera Theater
- Lusine Gevorkyan, lead singer of Russian nu metal bands Tracktor Bowling and Louna
- Artsvik Harutyunyan, singer and Armenia's entrant in the Eurovision Song Contest 2017
- Levon Aghasyan, Olympic athlete
- Vardan Ghazaryan, football coach and former player
- Gor Hakobyan, singer, rapper, actor and television host

== Bibliography ==
- Bournoutian, George A. (2018). Armenia and Imperial Decline: The Yerevan Province, 1900–1914. Milton Park, Abingdon, Oxon: Routledge. ISBN 978-1-351-06260-2. OCLC 1037283914.
- Korkotyan, Zaven (1932). Խորհրդային Հայաստանի բնակչությունը վերջին հարյուրամյակում (1831-1931) [The population of Soviet Armenia in the last century (1831–1931)] (PDF) (in Armenian). Yerevan: Pethrat. Archived from the original (PDF) on February 2, 2022.
- Tsutsiev, Arthur (2014). Atlas of the Ethno-Political History of the Caucasus (PDF). Translated by Nora Seligman Favorov. New Haven: Yale University Press. ISBN 9780300153088. Archived (PDF) from the original on June 17, 2023.
