= Ark Ecological NGO =

- Ա Ր Կ Բնապահպանական ՀԿ
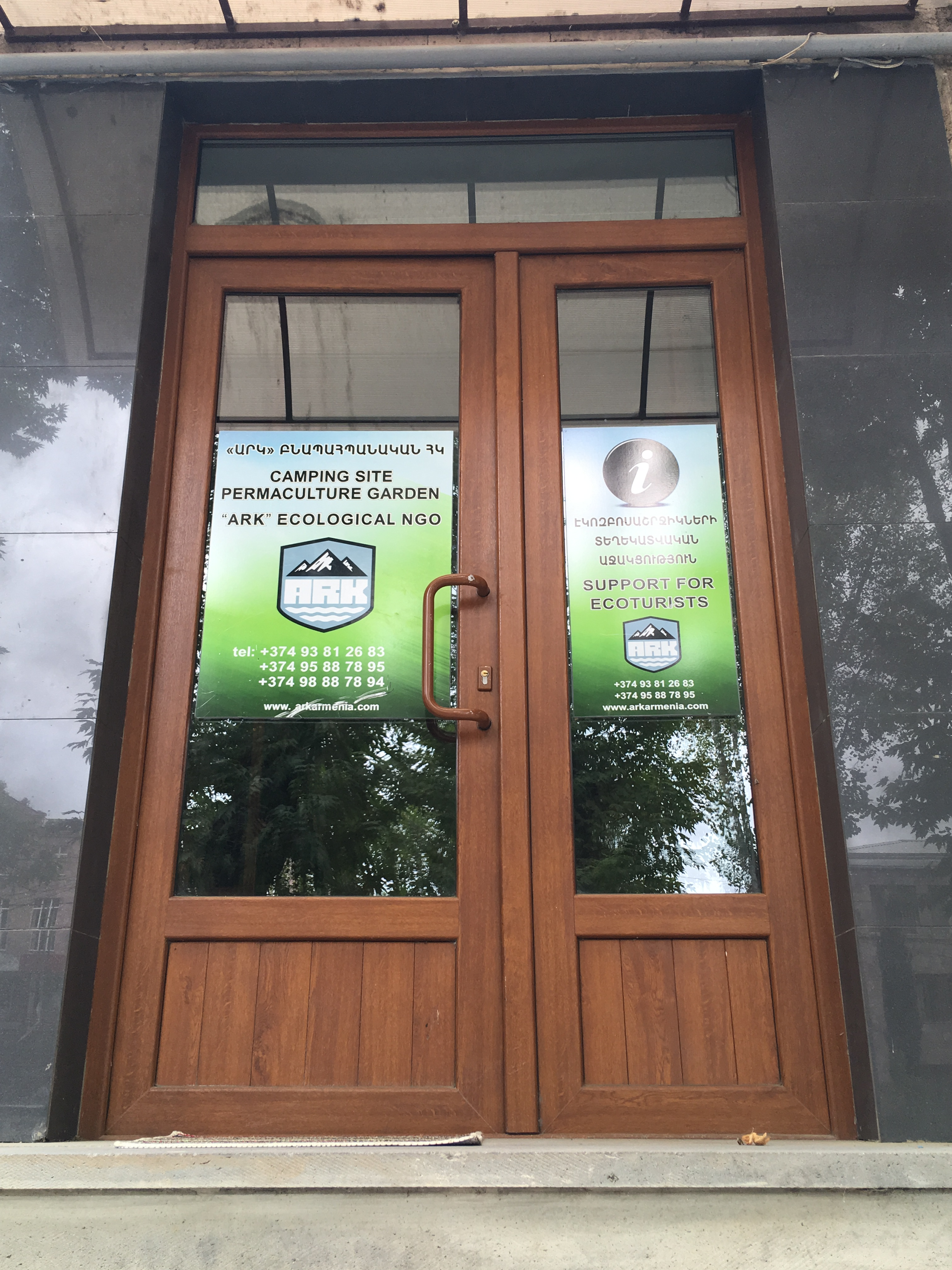
- Headquarters of Ark Ecological NGO in Kapan
- Abbreviation: ARK Armenia
- Founded: 2013
- Founder: Armen Kazaryan
- Founded at: Kapan, Armenia
- Type: Non-governmental
- Purpose: Sustainable development, ecotourism, and environmental preservation
- Headquarters: Kapan, Armenia
- Region served: Syunik Province, Armenia
- Services: Ecotourism, trail maintenance, permaculture, community development
- Official language: Armenian, Russian, English
- Key people: Armen Kazaryan, Siranush Vardanyan
- Website: www.arkarmenia.com

Ark Ecological NGO (also known as ARK Armenia; Armenian: Ա Ր Կ Բնապահպանական ՀԿ) is an Armenian non-governmental organization founded in 2013, dedicated to sustainable development, ecotourism, and permaculture in the Syunik Province of southern Armenia. The organization has its headquarters in Kapan and has built three ecocamps in the Syunik Province (Kapan, Arajadzor and Tandzaver) to host volunteers, tourists, and develop its projects related to permaculture, fitness and hiking.
