= Karen Sargsyan =

Karen Sargsyan may refer to:

- Karen Sargsyan (conductor) (born 1952), Armenian choirmaster and conductor
- Karen Sargsyan (footballer) (born 1983), Russian footballer
- Karen Sargsyan (sociologist) (born 1977), Armenian sociologist
- Karen Grigory Sargsyan (born 1980), Minister of Internal Affairs of the Republic of Artsakh
