= Syunik Airport =

Airport in Syunik, Armenia

Syunik Airport Սյունիք Oդանավակայան

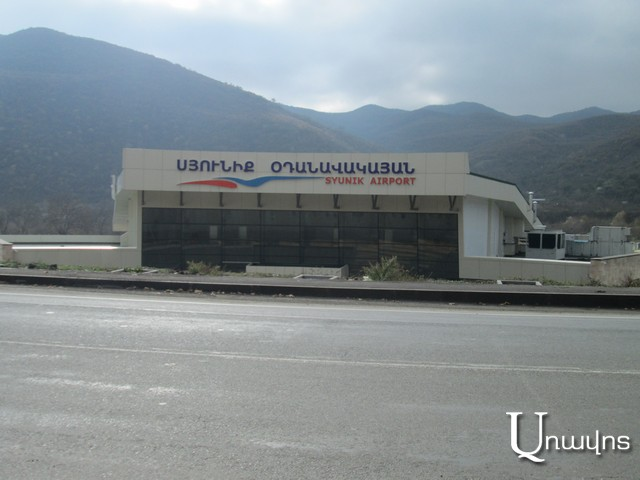
- IATA: YUK; ICAO: UDCK

Summary
- Airport type: International
- Owner: General Department of Civil Aviation of Armenia
- Operator: Syunik Airport LLC
- Serves: Kapan
- Location: Kapan
- Elevation AMSL: 2,308 ft / 704 m
- Coordinates: 39.202°N 46.455°E
- Website: syunik.aero

Map
- Location of airport in Armenia

Runways
| Direction | Length | | Surface |
| Direction | m | ft | Surface |
|---|---|---|---|
| 09/27 | 1,750 | 5,741 | Asphalt/concrete |

Syunik Airport (Armenian: Սյունիքի օդանավակայան, romanized: Syunik’i odanavakayan) (IATA: YUK) is located 4 km (2.5 mi) east of Kapan, the sixth largest city in Armenia, and the largest city in the province of Syunik. On December 5, 2020, the Civil Aviation Committee of Armenia announced that the reconstruction of the airport was completed. The airport reopened in 2023 and connects Kapan with the capital city of Yerevan.

Syunik Airport allows passengers to travel between Kapan and Yerevan in just 40 minutes, in sharp contrast to the five hour drive. It also serves other communities of southern Armenia.

== History ==
The airport originally started as an airstrip in the 1940s, receiving occasional flights operated by Soviet Antonov 2 aircraft. However, it was only officially opened in 1972, when scheduled air services commenced. In July 1971, it was decided that the city of Kapan was in need of an air link to the capital Yerevan. However, due to the challenging topographical location of Kapan, the location was deemed too dangerous and the whole plan was cancelled. Following negotiations with the Soviet authorities and the Communist party, it was agreed that an Ilyushin Il-14 aircraft would be sent to test the airfield. In the following months, slight modifications to the runway and the installation of radio equipment were made, allowing the airfield to be operated with higher safety standards.

By mid 1972, scheduled services commenced between Yerevan and Kapan. All flights were operated by Yak-40 aircraft. Operations at Kapan Airport were quite challenging, as the published approach was for aircraft to fly into the nearby Voghji river valley, descend under the clouds and perform a left turn to line up on the runway. However, this did not hinder operations, and Kapan Airport even saw 10-12 daily flights at times.

Following the collapse of the Soviet Union in the early 1990s and the subsequent Nagorno-Karabakh War, Kapan Airport fell into disrepair.

After the 2020 Karabakh war, the airport remained on the Armenian side, but is now very close to the border separating Armenian and Azeri troops.

== Ownership ==
In September 2017, a 25-year concession was granted to Syunik Airport Ltd, a company founded by the state-owned Syunik Regional Development Foundation. In May 2018, 50% of its shares were transferred to the benevolent foundation of Zangezur Copper and Molybdenum Combine.

== Reconstruction ==
In 2013, talks to reopen the airport began between the governor of Syunik and businessmen from Armenia and abroad. Due to the dismissal of the governor, negotiations died down, only to be restarted in 2016 and finalized in 2017, in time for the start of the construction.

The about 2-km long runway has been widened to 40 m, and a new passenger terminal has been constructed. As of May 2019, over 800 million drams had been invested in the project, with the total budget set at around 2.3 billion drams ($5 million). As of April 2020, about 2 billion drams had been invested in the project, with the total budget raised to around 2.8 billion drams ($5.8 million).

In December 2020, the Armenian Civil Aviation Committee announced that the restoration of the airport had been completed. The runway and apron had been restored, a new terminal building constructed, and proper perimeter fencing established.

The reconstructed airport reopened on August 21, 2023.

== Destinations ==
| Airlines | Destinations |
|---|---|
| Novair | Yerevan |

== See also ==
- List of airports in Armenia
- List of the busiest airports in Armenia
- List of the busiest airports in the former Soviet Union
- Transport in Armenia
