= Vachagan =

River in Armenia

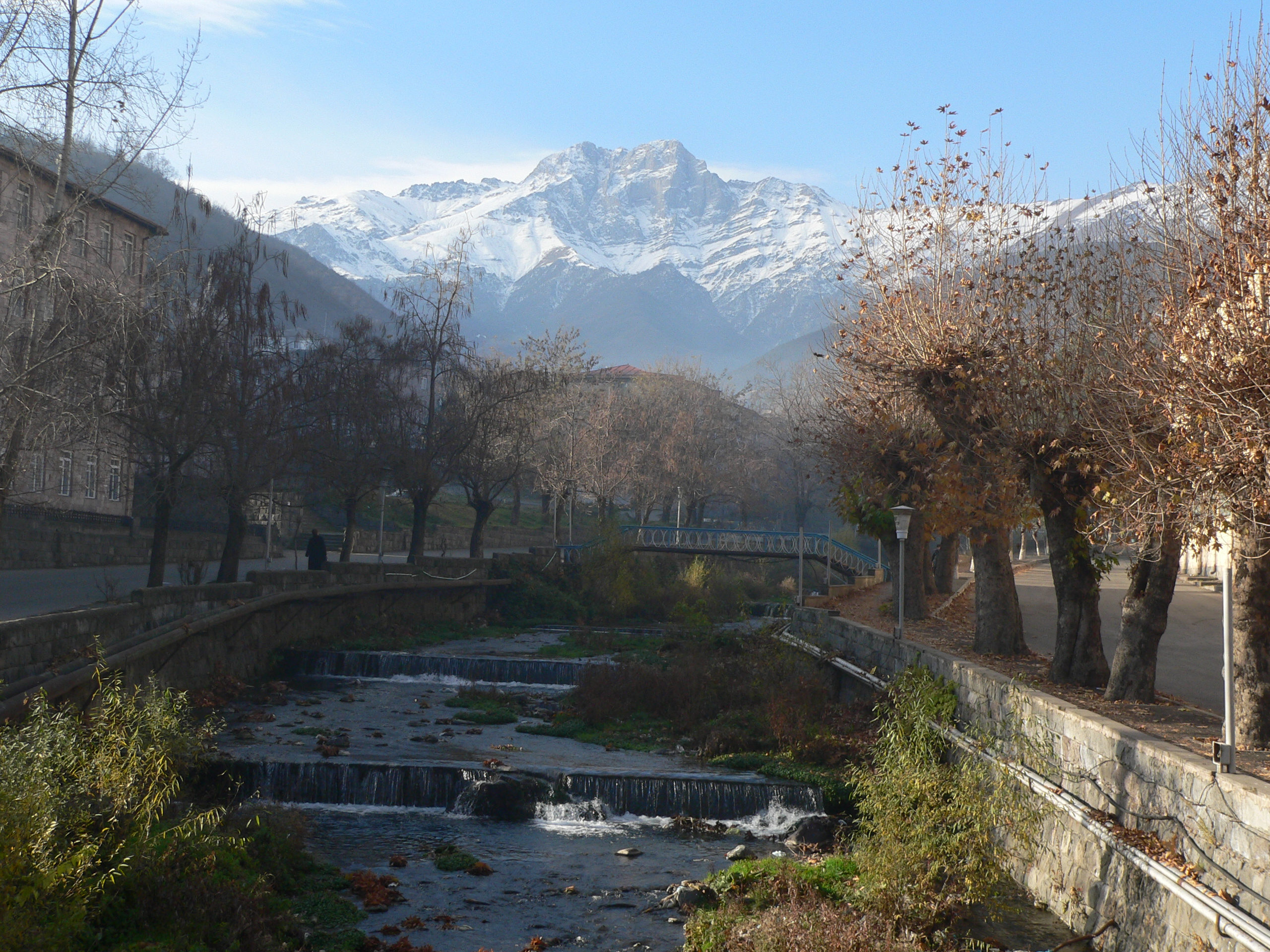
- The Vachagan in Kapan

Location
- Country: Armenia

Physical characteristics
- Source
  - location: Mount Khustup, Syunik Mountains
  - elevation: 1,050 m (3,440 ft)
- Mouth: Voghji
  - location: Kapan
  - coordinates: 39.2001°N 46.4063°E
- Length: 11 km (6.8 mi)
- Basin size: 35.7 km^{2} (13.8 sq mi)

Basin features
- Progression: Voghji→ Aras→ Kura→ Caspian Sea

The Vachagan (Armenian: Վաչագան) is a river in the southern Syunik Province of Armenia.

== Geography ==
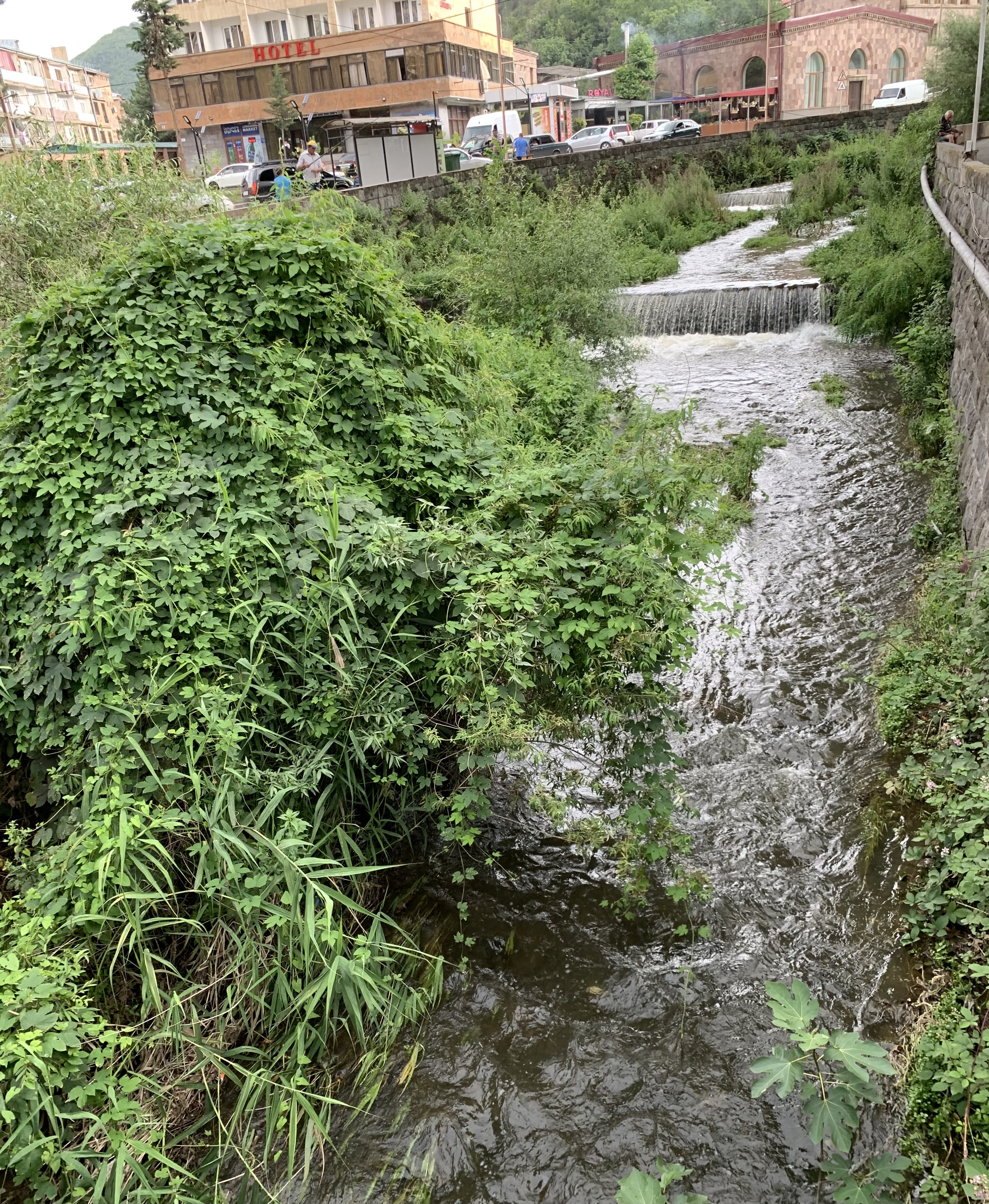
Vachagan river near Kapan

The Vachagan is a tributary of the Voghji running through a portion of southern Syunik Province, Armenia. It has a total length of 11.6 kilometres (7.2 mi) and a catchment area of 35.7 square kilometres (13.8 sq mi).

== See also ==
- List of lakes of Armenia
- Geography of Armenia
