= Khustup =

Mountain in Armenia

Khustup Խուստուփ
- Khustup

Highest point
- Elevation: 3,206 m (10,518 ft)
- Coordinates: 39°08′08″N 46°19′53″E

Geography
- Location within Armenia
- Location: Armenia

Khustup (Armenian: Խուստուփ) is a mountain located in the southern Syunik Province of Armenia, to the south of Kapan. The height of the mountain is 3,206 meters (10,518 ft). The source of the Vachagan River is located at the northern edge of Mount Khustup.

The Armenian national hero and military leader Garegin Nzhdeh is buried on the slopes of Mount Khustup.

== Gallery ==
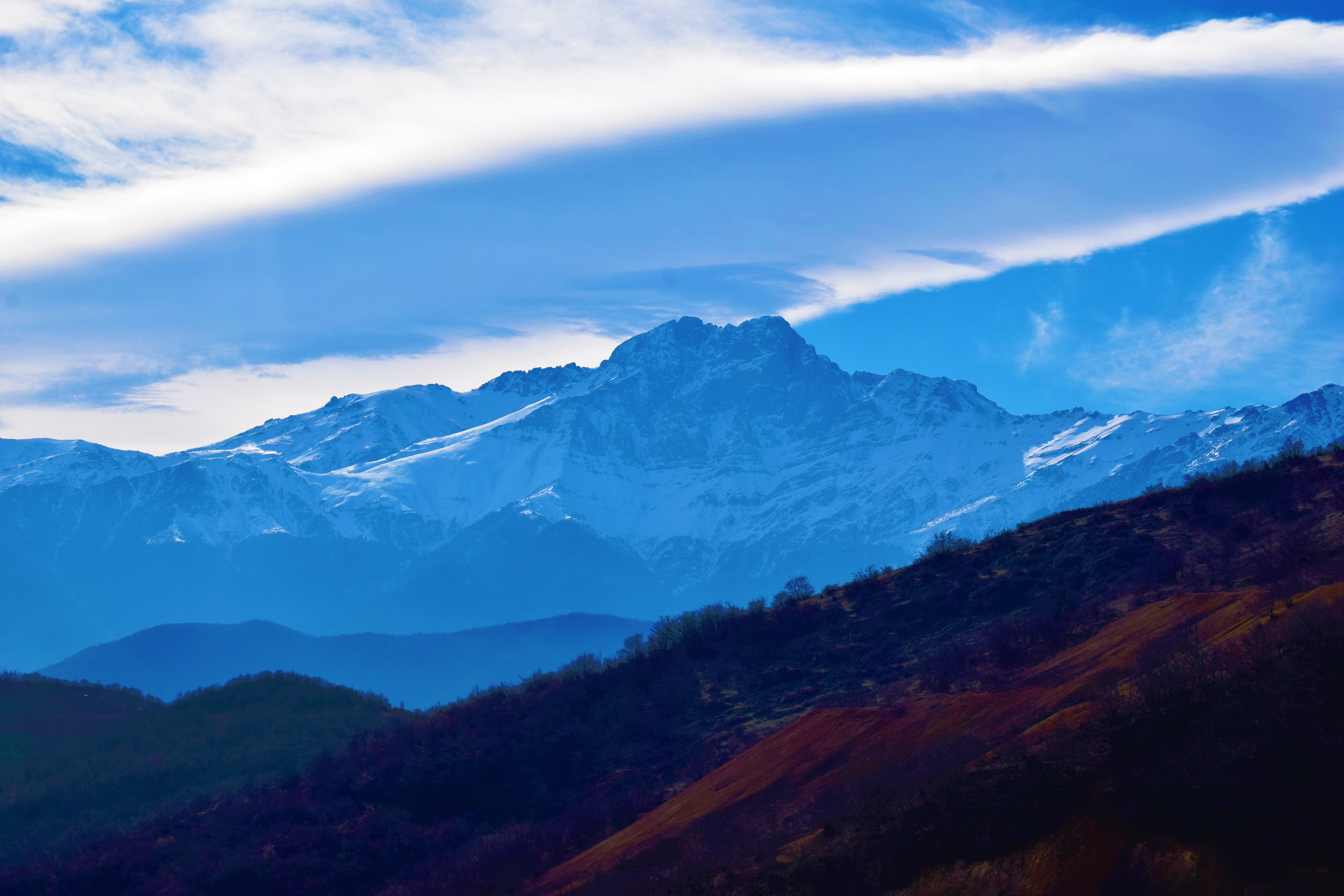

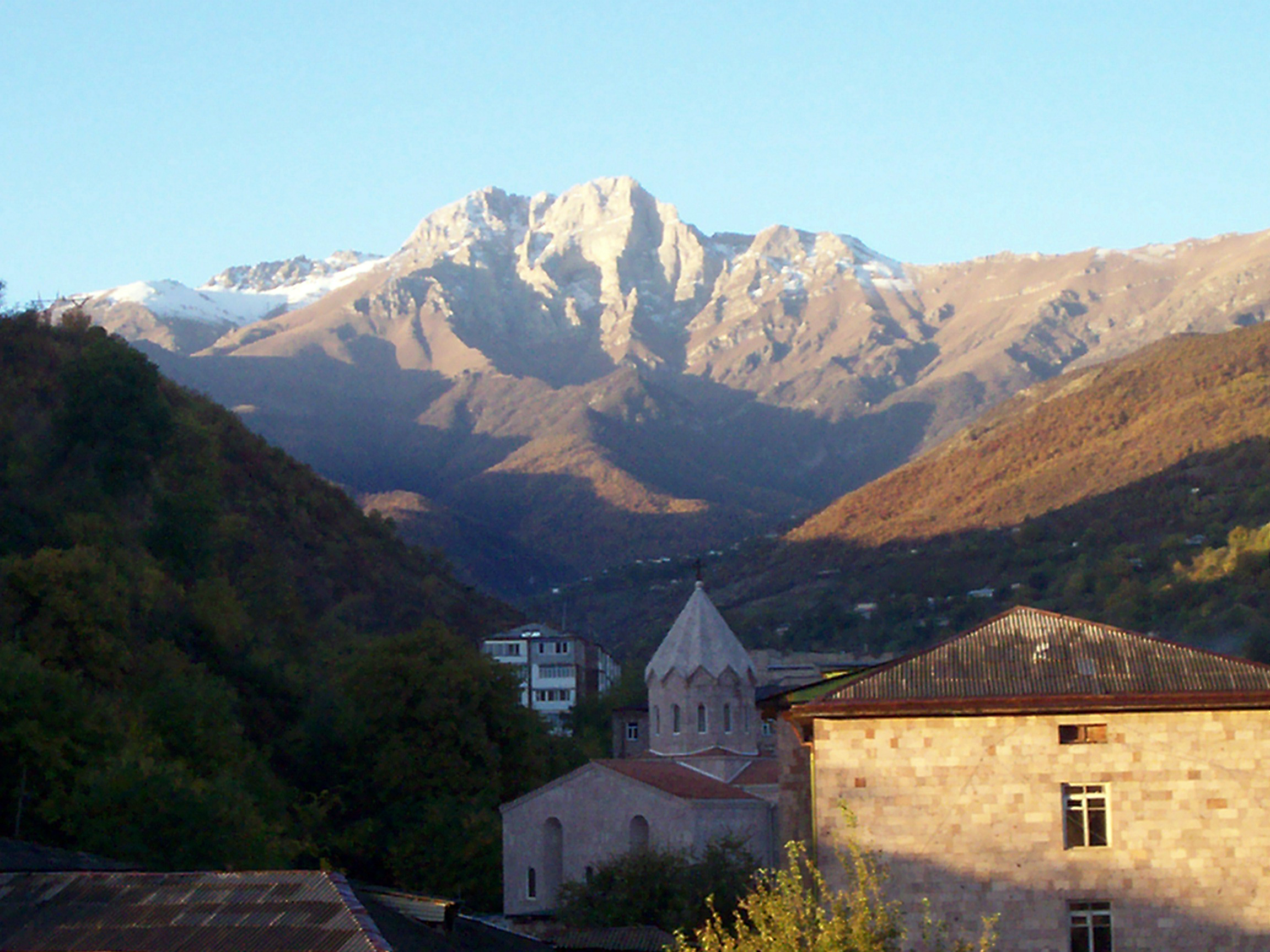
Saint Mesrop Mashtots Church with Khustup in the background

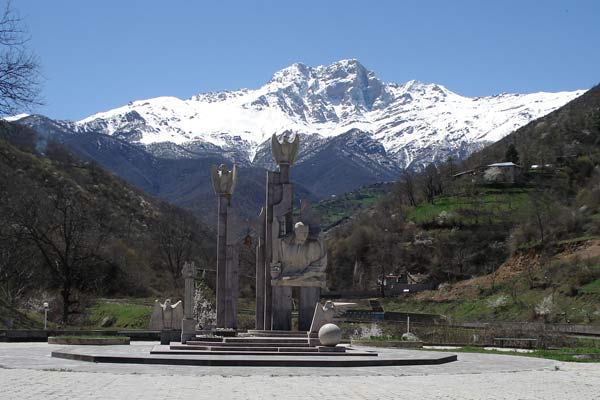
Monument to Garegin Nzhdeh with Khustup in the background

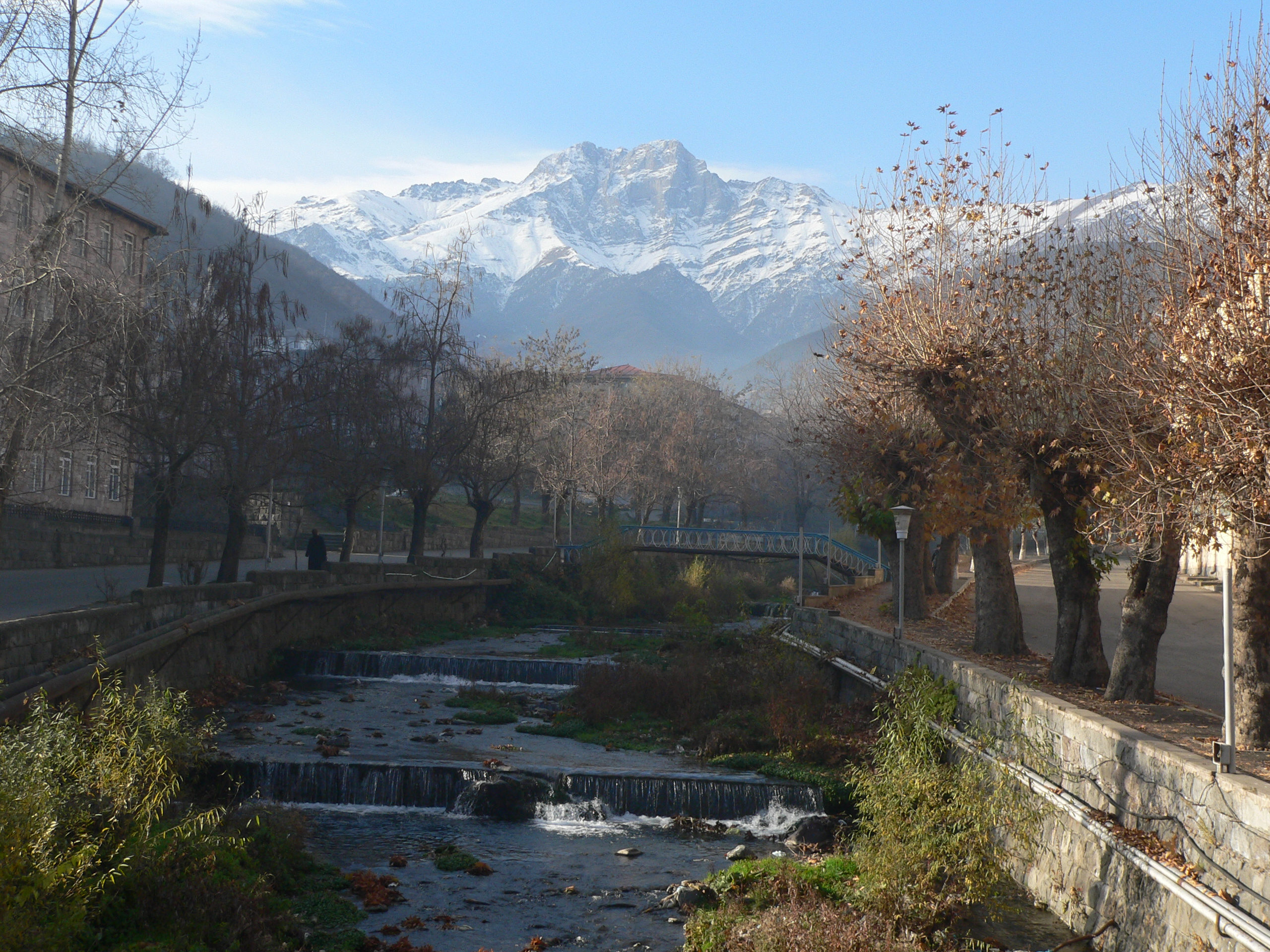
View of Khustup and the Vachagan River from Kapan

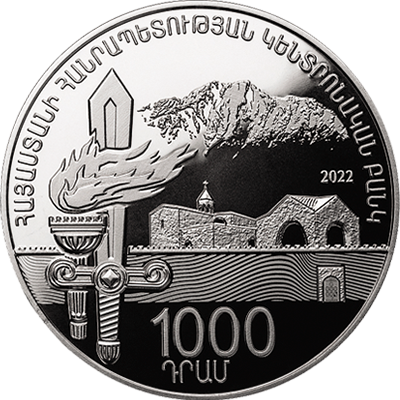
The fortress wall of Halidzor against the background of Mount Khustup (Obverse of "David Bek" coin, 2022)

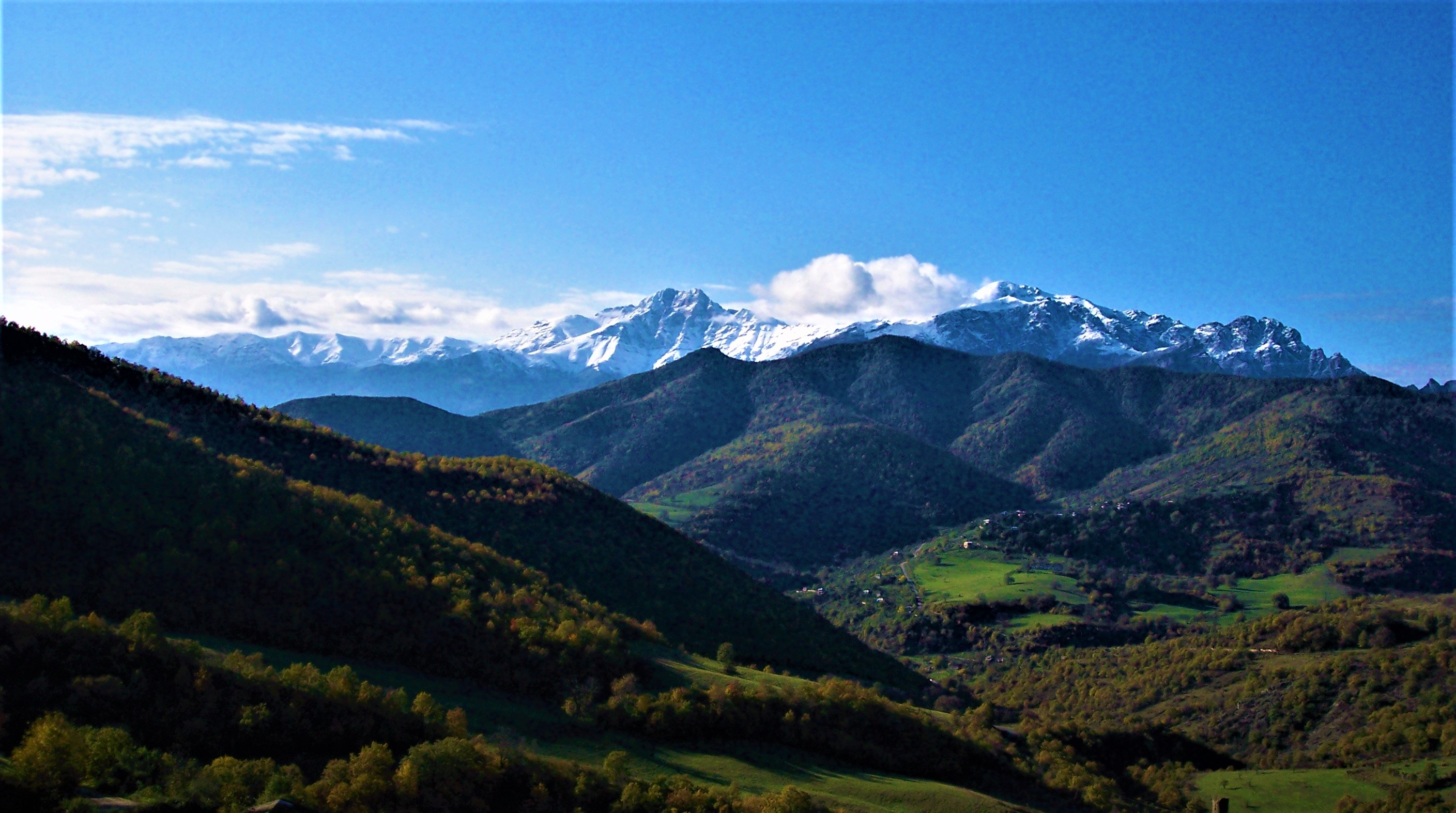

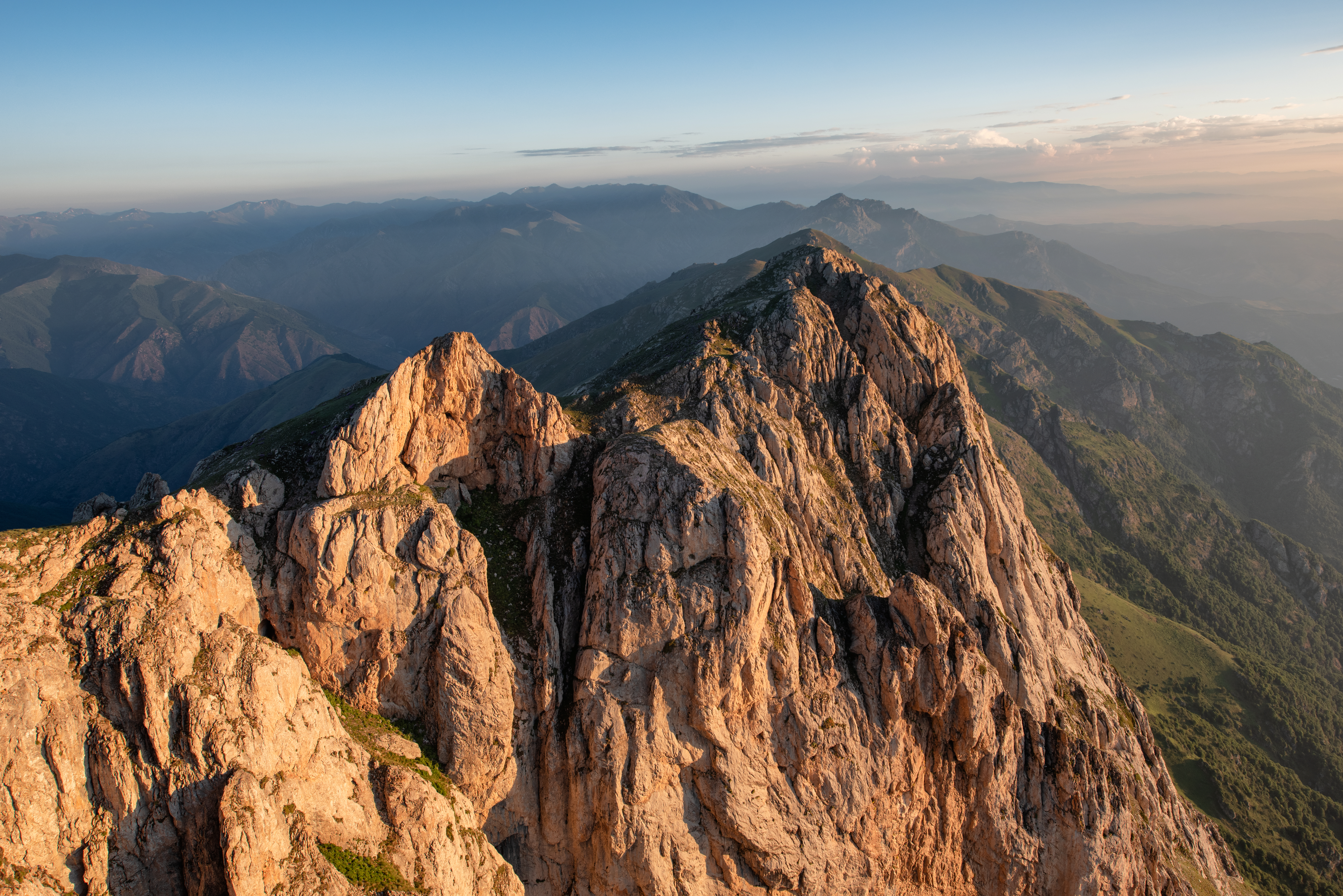
