= Behind a Mask (album) =

Studio album by Louna
- Released: 30 April 2013
- Recorded: 2012
- Genre: Alternative rock Punk rock
- Length: 39:01
- Label: Red Decade Records
- Producer: Travis Leake

Louna chronology
The Time of X (2012)	Behind a Mask (2013)	Мы — это Louna (2013)

Singles from Behind a Mask
- 1. "Mama" Released: 2012; 2. "Business" Released: 26 March 2013

Professional ratings
Review scores
Source	Rating
Blabbermouth	7/10 stars

Behind a Mask is the debut English-language album by Russian alternative/punk rock band Louna. It was released on 30 April 2013, in North America on Red Decade Records. The disc is a compilation of the best tracks from the albums Let's Get Louder and The Time of X, translated from Russian to English.

== Production ==
The song "Mama" was on the Chicago radio station, 95.1 WIIL Rock, playing Marija Will Rock's Show, and got airplay in the US iTunes chart along with the song "Business". The song "Up There" was filmed video clip.

== Track listing ==
No.	Title	Lyrics	Music	Length
1.	"System Destroys"	V. Demidenko	Louna	03:59
2.	"Fight Club"	V. Demidenko	Louna	04:31
3.	"Business"	V. Demidenko	Louna	03:57
4.	"My Rock n Roll"	V. Demidenko	Louna	03:59
5.	"Let's Get Louder"	V. Demidenko	Louna	03:49
6.	"Up There"	V. Demidenko	Louna	04:26
7.	"The End of Peace"		Louna	04:16
8.	"Storming Heaven"	V. Demidenko	Louna	03:59
9.	"Mama"	V. Demidenko	Louna	04:00
10.	"Inside"	V. Demidenko	Louna	04:45
11.	"Storming Heaven (Michael Carey Remix)" (Available only for purchase on iTunes)	V. Demidenko	Louna	04:05

== Personnel ==
Louna

Lousine Gevorkian	— lead vocals
Vitaly Demidenko	— bass guitar
Rouben Kazariyan	— lead guitar
Sergey Ponkratiev	— rhythm guitar
Leonid Kinzbursky	— drums
