= Lusine Gevorkyan =

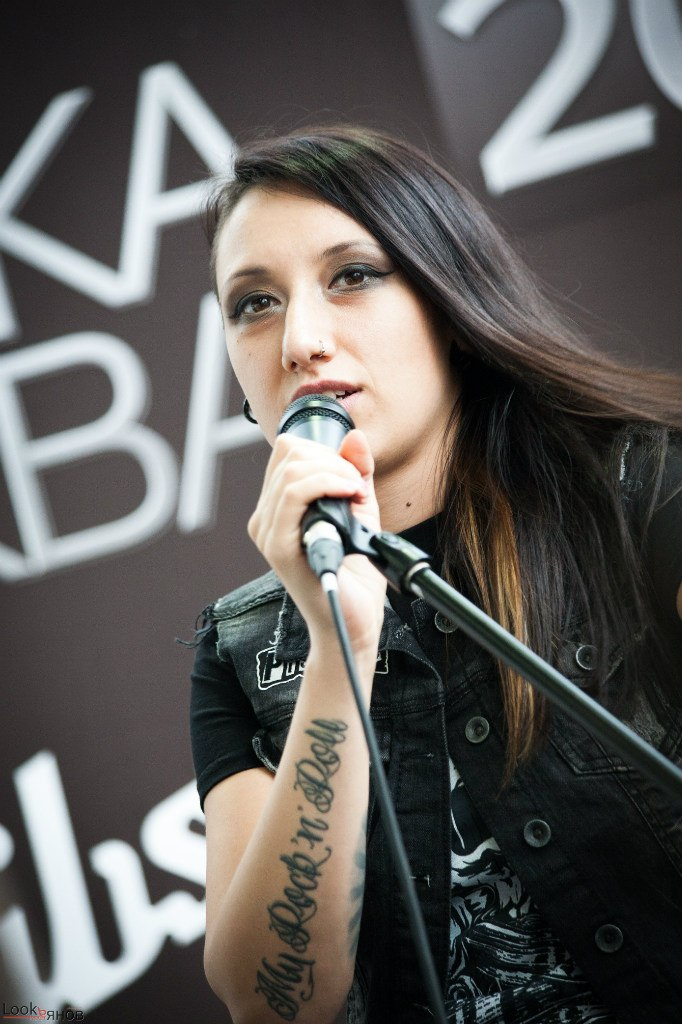
- Gevorkyan in 2012

Background information
- Also known as: Lou
- Born: Lousine Gevorkian; 21 February 1983 (age 43); Kapan, Armenian SSR, Soviet Union
- Genres: Alternative rock Punk rock Alternative metal Nu metal
- Occupation: Lead vocals
- Instrument: Keyboards
- Years active: 2003–present
- Labels: Red Decade Records; M2BA; Souyz Music; Moroz Records; A-ONE Records
- Website: lounarocks.com louna.ru tracktorbowling.ru

Lusine Gevorkyan (Lousine Gevorkian; Armenian: Լուսինե Գևորգյան, Russian: Лусинэ Геворкян; born 21 February 1983) is the lead singer of the Russian nu metal band Tracktor Bowling and the alternative rock/punk band Louna.

Gevorkyan was born in Kapan. She was one of the founding members of the Russian band Sfera Vliyaniya, but she left the group one year after its establishment. Later, she was picked as the lead singer of another project, Tracktor Bowling, that became one of the most popular metal bands in Russia. In 2008, she founded one more band, Louna, and at the moment Lusine is a member of both.

== Discography ==
=== Albums, singles, DVD ===
Year	Band	Release name	Type of release / Comment
2005	Tracktor Bowling	It's Time To…	single
2005	Tracktor Bowling	Черта	album
2006	Tracktor Bowling	Шаги По Стеклу	album
2007	Tracktor Bowling	Vol.1 (Live)	live album
2007	Tracktor Bowling	Полгода до весны…	acoustic album
2008	Tracktor Bowling	Время	single
2008	Tracktor Bowling	Поколение Рок	single
2009	Tracktor Bowling	Ни шагу назад	single
2009	Louna	Чёрный (Black)	single
2009	Louna	Белый (White)	single
2010	Louna	Солнце (Sun)	single
2010	Tracktor Bowling	Tracktor Bowling	album
2010	Louna	Сделай громче! (Let's Get Louder)	album
2011	Louna	Кому веришь ты? (feat. Tem)	single
2012	Louna	Время X (The Time of X)	album
2012	Louna	Mama	single
2013	Louna	Проснись и пой! (Rise and Shine)	live album, DVD
2013	Louna	Business	single
2013	Louna	Behind a Mask	album
2013	Louna	Мы — это Louna (We Are Louna)	album
2015	Tracktor Bowling	Натрон	single
2015	Tracktor Bowling	Наш 2006-й	single
2015	Tracktor Bowling	Бесконечность	album
2016	Louna	Дивный новый мир	album
