= Shikahogh =

Shikahogh Շիկահող
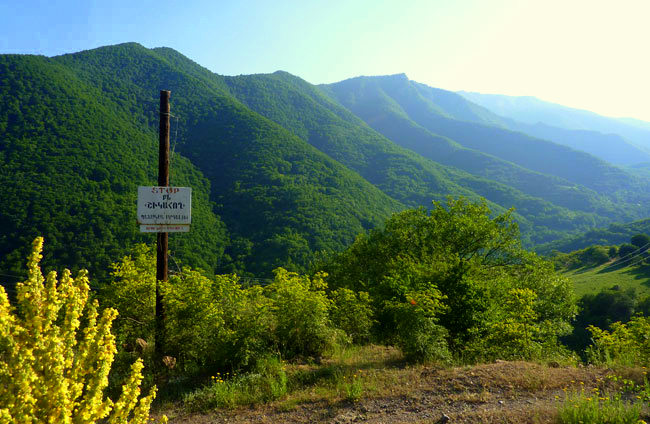
- Shikahogh State Reserve

- Location within Armenia Location within Syunik Province
- Coordinates: 39°05′43″N 46°28′25″E
- Country: Armenia
- Province: Syunik
- Municipality: Kapan

Area
  - Total: 18.95 km^{2} (7.32 sq mi)

Population (2011)
  - Total: 229
  - Density: 12.1/km^{2} (31.3/sq mi)
- Time zone: UTC+4 (AMT)

Shikahogh (Armenian: Շիկահող) is a village in the Kapan Municipality of the Syunik Province in Armenia. Shikahogh State Reserve, the second largest forest reserve in Armenia, is located to the south of the village. The provincial centre lies 23 km to the southeast of town of Gapan, at a height of 980 m above sea level.

== Etymology ==
The name of the village originates from the term Shek hogh (Շեկ հող), meaning "Red land".

== Demographics ==
The Statistical Committee of Armenia reported its population was 189 in 2010, down from 272 at the 2001 census.

== Gallery ==
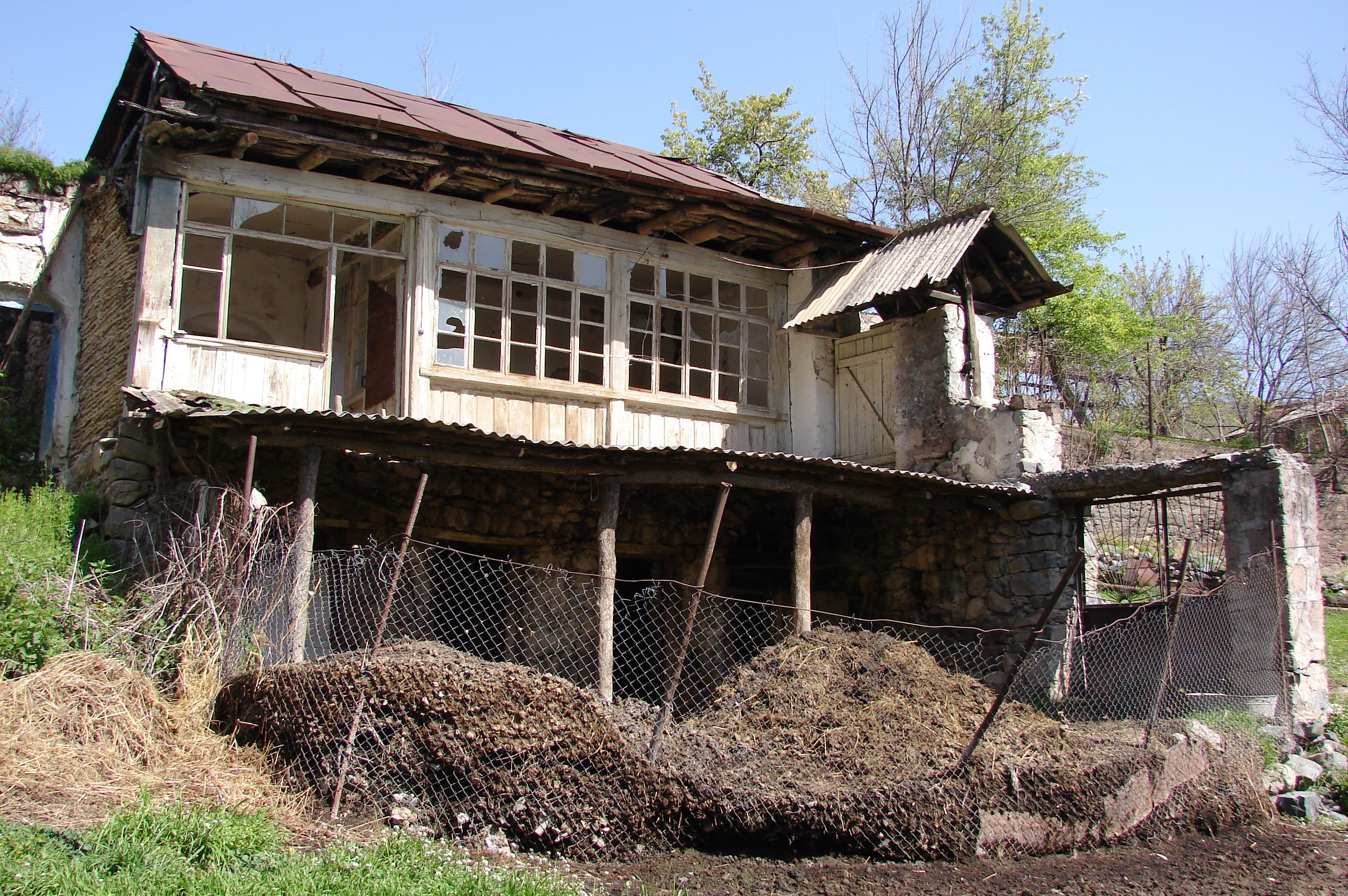

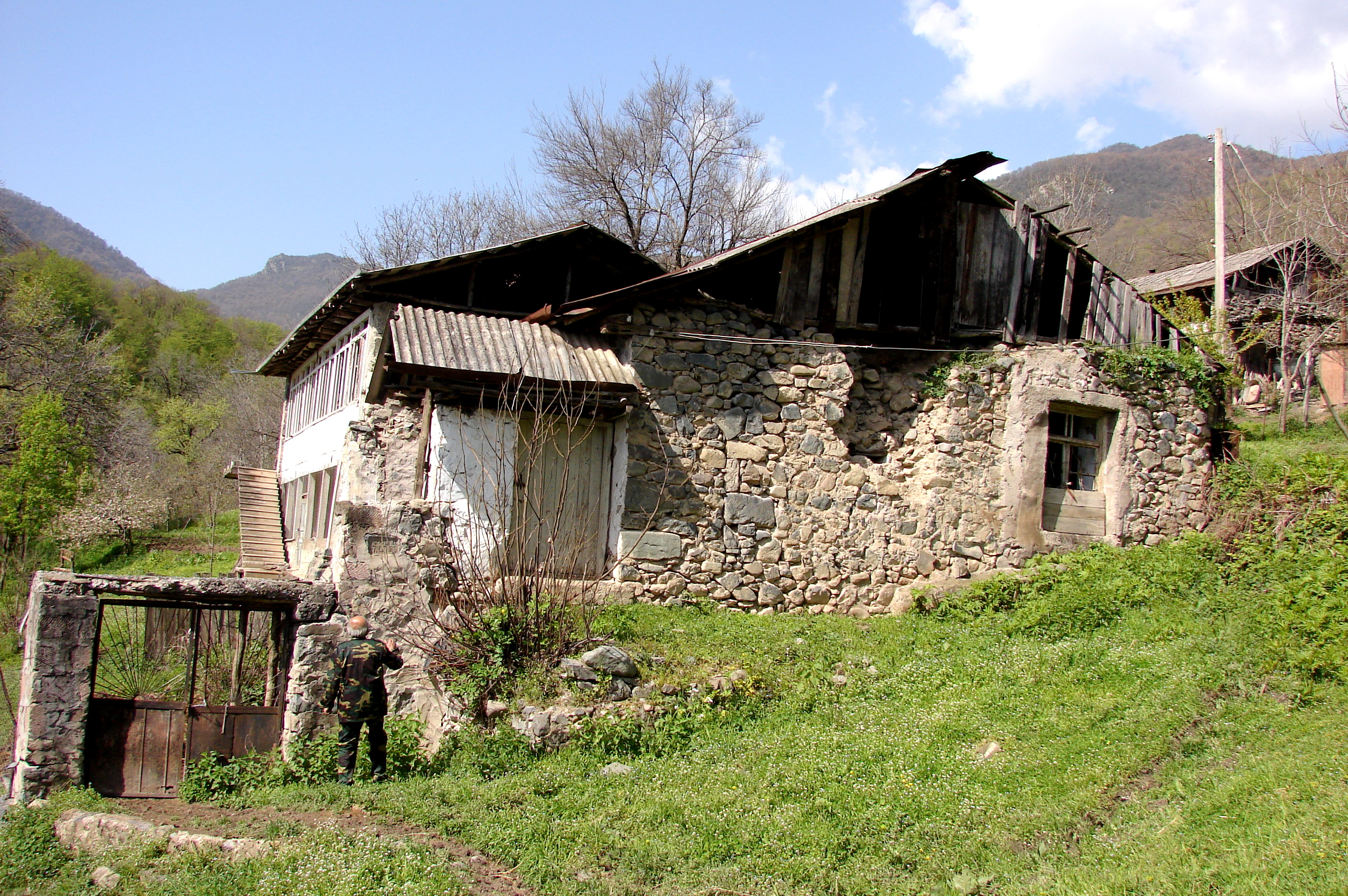
