= Shikahogh State Reserve =

Armenian forest reserve

- IUCN category Ia (strict nature reserve)
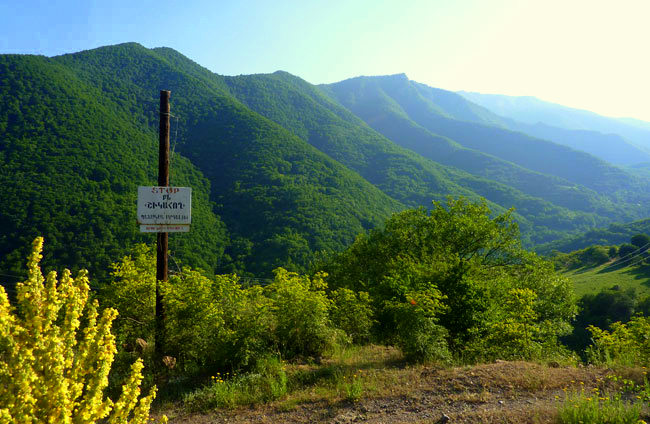
- Shikahogh State Reserve

- Location within Armenia
- Location: Armenia
- Coordinates: 39°02′N 46°27′E
- Area: 10,330 ha (25,500 acres)
- Established: 1958
- Governing body: Ministry of Nature Protection, Armenia

Shikahogh State Reserve (Armenian: Շիկահողի արգելոց, romanized: Shikahoghi argelots') is Armenia’s second largest forest reserve, covering some 10,330 ha of land, and located in southern Armenia in the Syunik Province. Environmentalists have said it has been largely unaffected by Armenia’s massive post-Soviet deforestation due to its remote location and care shown by residents of nearby villages.

The Shikahogh State Reserve is home to about 1,100 species of plants, 70 of which have been registered in the Red Book of Armenia and 18 in the Red Book of the Soviet Union. The fauna of Shikahogh has not been fully explored, but studies have already revealed rare species of animals such as leopard, bezoar, bear, snowcock, viper, and hedgehog.

== Highway controversy ==
Shikahogh is the only place where the forest remains intact. It is home to unique species considered to be the wealth of not only Armenia but the whole world as well.

According to Social-Ecological Association Chairwoman Srbuhi Harutyunyan, trees in Mtnadzor were not logged only because they were beyond reach, but in this case the Mtnadzor forests are facing the threat of logging.

“Countries lacking in natural raw materials are eyeing our natural raw materials, and this is the only preserved unique forest, which is very dense and very useful and one can prepare various things from the raw material available here”, says Artemis Lepejyan, the Chairwoman of the Saint Sandukht Women’s Union. “The whole policy consists in the fact that they are ready to spend millions on this road, because they will make billions on it.”

If the highway is constructed the preserve will be split in two and besides the fact that large trucks will be passing through it polluting and disturbing the course of regular life in the reserve, but will also become a reachable place for poachers and loggers.

== See also ==
- Kapan
- Geography of Armenia
