= Louna =

Russian rock band

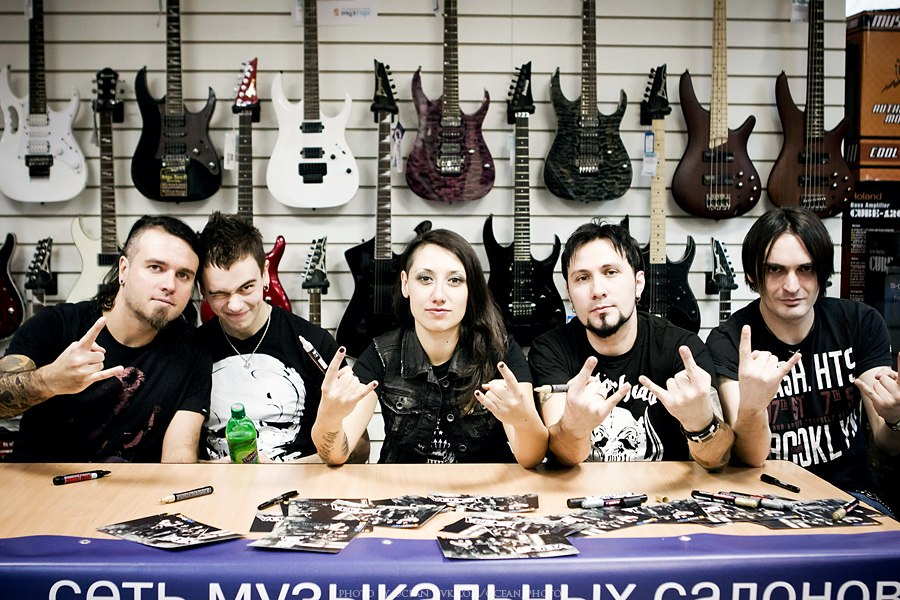
- Louna in Saint Petersburg, March 9, 2012

Background information
- Origin: Moscow, Russia
- Genres: Hard rock, punk rock
- Years active: 2008–present
- Labels: Red Decade Records; M2BA; Souyz Music
- Members: Lousine Gevorkian; Vitaly Demidenko; Rouben Kazariyan; Sergey Ponkratiev; Leonid "Pilot" Kinzbursky
- Website: louna.ru

Louna is an alternative/punk rock band, formed in Moscow in 2008 by Tracktor Bowling musicians Lousine Gevorkian and Vitaly Demidenko.

Their debut album, Let's Get Louder, was released in 2010. In total, the group has released three albums and six singles to date.

The band is best known for its socially conscious songs criticizing Russian political elites and religion. Louna's songs are frequently found on Russian radio and rock charts.

Louna is composed of members Lousine Gevorkian (vocals), Vitaly Demidenko (bass), Sergey Ponkratiev (guitars), Rouben Kazariyan (guitar) and Leonid "Pilot" Kinzbursky (drums).

In autumn 2013 the band went into a large-scale tour of 26 U.S. cities with teams of The Pretty Reckless and Heaven's Basement.

On 13 December 2018 they released a new English-speaking album, “Panopticon”.

== Awards and nominations ==
Year	Nominee / work	Award	Result
2009	Louna	Best New Alternative Artist	Won
2011	Louna	Song of the Year "Fight Club"	Won
2011	Louna	Female Vocalist "Lousine Gevorkian"	Nominated
2011	Louna	Breakthrough Artist "Louna"	Nominated
2012	Louna	Female Vocalist "Lousine Gevorkian"	Won
2012	Louna	Album of the Year "Time X"	Nominated
2014	Louna	500 Best songs Nashe Radio "Mama", "Let's Get Louder"	Won
2014	Louna	Group of the Year "Louna"	Nominated
2014	Lousine Gevorkian	Leader chart "Tarakany! and Lousine Gevorkian"	Won

== Band members ==
Current members

- Lousine Gevorkian — lead vocals, keyboards (2008–present)
- Vitaly Demidenko — bass guitar (2008–present)
- Rouben Kazariyan — lead guitar (2008–present)
- Sergey Ponkratiev — rhythm guitar (2008–present)
- Leonid Kinzbursky — drums (2008–present)

== Discography ==
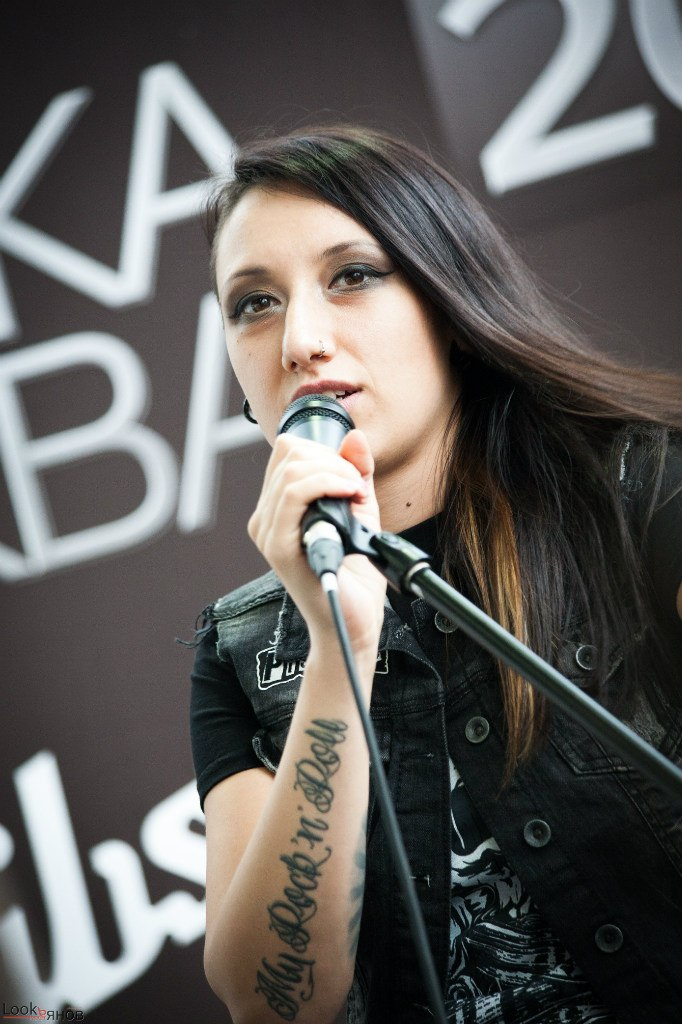
Lousine Gevorkian

=== Studio albums ===
No.	Year	Album name
1.	2010	Сделай громче! (Make it louder!)
2.	2012	Время X (The Time of X)
3.	2013	Behind a Mask
4.	2013	Мы — это Louna (We are Louna)
5.	2016	Дивный новый мир (Brave new world)
6.	2018	Полюса (Poles)
7.	2018	Panopticon
8.	2020	Начало нового круга (Start of a new circle)
9.	2022	Рубикон (Rubicon)

=== Live albums ===
No.	Year	Album name
1.	2013	Проснись и пой! (Wake up and sing!)
2.	2016	Песни о мире (Songs about peace) (featuring the Globalis Symphony Orchestra)
3.	2020	Live Show (Re:Public Minsk Belarus)

=== Collections ===
No.	Year	Collection name
1.	2015	The Best of
2.	2019	X (The Best of)
3.	2021	Обратная сторона LOUNA (Reverse side of LOUNA) (acoustic versions)

=== Singles ===
No.	Year	Single name
1.	2009	Армагеддон (Armageddon)
2.	2009	Чёрный (Black)
3.	2009	Белый (White)
4.	2010	Солнце (Sun)
5.	2011	Кому веришь ты? (feat. Tem) (Who do you believe?)
6.	2012	Mama
7.	2013	Mama (Re-released)
8.	2013	Business
9.	2016	18+
10.	2018	Колыбельная / Лопасти (Lullaby / Blades)
11.	2018	Так (Like this)
12.	2018	Другие (Others)
13.	2018	Shadow Kingdoms (feat. Craig Mabbitt, Kevin Thrasher)
14.	2018	Brave New World
15.	2019	S.N.U.F.F.
16.	2020	Полюса (Poles)
17.	2020	Песня о мире (Song about peace)
18.	2020	Сердца из стали (Hearts of steal)
19.	2020	Вендетта (Vendetta)
20.	2020	Из этих стен (From these walls)
21.	2020	В бой (To battle) (tribute to DDT)
22.	2020	Станем стеной (Will become a wall)
23.	2020	Сигнал в пустоте (Signal in the void)
24.	2021	Незабудка (Forget-me-not)

== Videography ==
No.	Year	Release name	Type of release / Comment
1.	2009	Армагеддон	music clip
2.	2010	Зачем?	music clip
3.	2010	Сделай громче!	music clip
4.	2011	Карма мира	music clip
5.	2011	Мой рок-н-ролл (в 3D)	music clip
6.	2012	Мама	music clip
7.	2012	Mama	music clip
8.	2012	Люди смотрят вверх	music clip
9.	2013	Business	music clip
10.	2013	Up There	music clip
11.	2013	Ночь, дорога и рок	music clip
12.	2014	С тобой	music clip

== See also ==
- Tracktor Bowling
- Lousine Gevorkian
- Vitaly Demidenko
