= Voghji (river) =

River in Armenia

Voghji Okchuchay
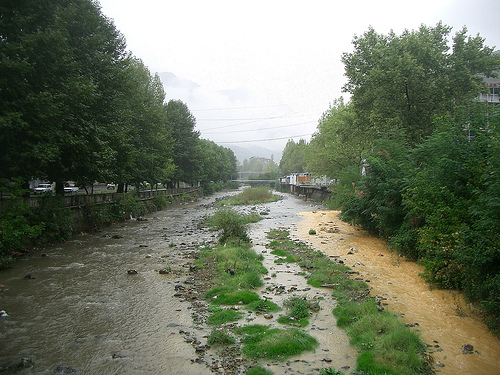
- The Voghji river in Kapan

Location
- Countries: Armenia, Azerbaijan

Physical characteristics
- Source
  - location: Mount Kaputjugh
  - coordinates: 39.1560878°N 46.0170085°E
- Mouth: Aras
  - coordinates: 39.0314526°N 46.7562675°E
- Length: 82 km (51 mi)

Basin features
- Progression: Aras→ Kura→ Caspian Sea
- Tributaries
  - right: Vachagan

The Voghji (Armenian: Ողջի, romanized: Oġǰi) or Okchuchay (Azerbaijani: Oxçuçay) is a river on the south slopes of the Lesser Caucasus range, and is a left tributary of the Aras. It flows through the territory of Armenia and Azerbaijan.

In its upper reaches, the Voghji has formed a deep canyon which, near the city of Kapan, turns into a wide valley. It is fed by a range of sources.

The cities of Zangilan and Mincivan in Azerbaijan and Kajaran and Kapan in Armenia lie along the banks of the river.

The Kapan and Voghji hydroelectric power stations are located along the section of the river in Armenia.

== See also ==
- List of rivers of Armenia
- List of lakes of Armenia
- Rivers and lakes in Azerbaijan
- Geography of Armenia
- Geography of Azerbaijan
