= Tracktor Bowling =

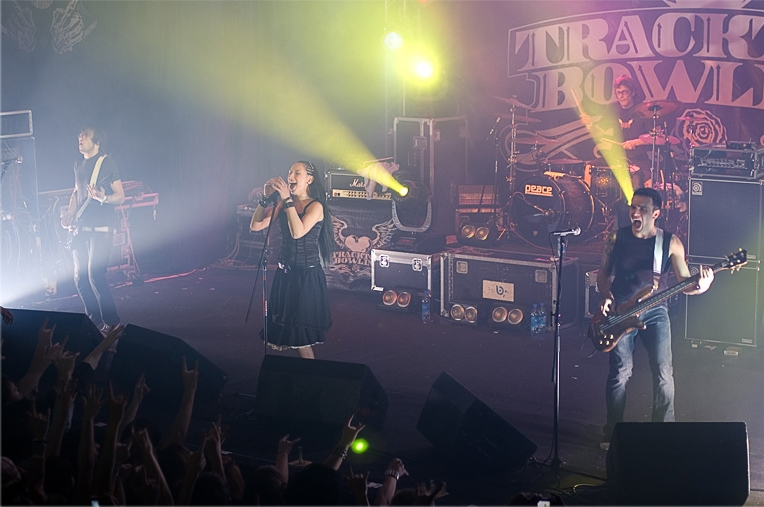

Background information
- Origin: Moscow, Russia
- Genres: Nu metal; alternative metal; alternative rock
- Years active: 1996–2017
- Labels: Moroz Records; A-ONE Records; Souyz Music
- Members: Lusine "Lou" Gevorkyan; Alexander "Kondrat" Kondratyev; Andrey "Mult" Ponasutkin; Vitaliy "Vit" Demidenko; Stepan Chetverikov
- Past members: Mila; Grek; Klark; Den; Che Gevara
- Website: tracktorbowling.ru

Tracktor Bowling was a Russian nu metal band, formed in Moscow in 1996.

== History ==
The band formed in 1996. In 2000, their demo-track record "Mutatsiya" ("Mutation") gained early success and netted them a budding reputation as leaders of the Moscow alternative rock scene.

Their debut album was released in 2002. The band released five albums, one Live-album, one DVD and some singles.

== Members ==
- Lou (vocals)
- Kondrat (vocals, guitar)
- Mult (guitar)
- Vit (bass)
- Stepan (drums)

== Awards and nominations ==
Year	Nominee / work	Award	Result
2003	-	Finalist in nomination «Best Russian Act» in Moscow Alternative Music Awards	Nominated
2006	-	Best Act 2005–2006 in Russian Alternative Music Prize	Won
2007	-	Finalist in nomination «Best Alternative Act» in Moskovskij Komsomolets Newspaper	Nominated
2008	Song «Время»	Best Soundtrack (for «Nirvana» Movie) in Moscow Alternative Music Awards	Won

== Discography ==
=== Albums ===
- Напролом (2002)
- Черта (2005)
- Шаги по стеклу (2006)
- Tracktor Bowling (2010)
- Бесконечность (2015)

=== Singles ===
- It’s Time To… (2005)
- Время (2008)
- Поколение Рок (2008)
- Ни шагу назад (2009)

=== DVDs ===
- Два шага до… и год после (2006)

=== Demo recordings ===
- Alternative Invasion Vol.1 (1997)
- Мутация (1999)
- Мутация 2 [000] (2000)

== Literature ==
- Interview @ Rovesnik Magazine, 2011, p. 16
- Interview @ Dark City, No. 55, 2010, p. 32

== See also ==
- Louna
- Slot

== Sources ==
- Official website
- Page @ myspace
- Page @ last.fm (more than 70.000 listeners)
