= Arajadzor =

Arajadzor Առաջաձոր
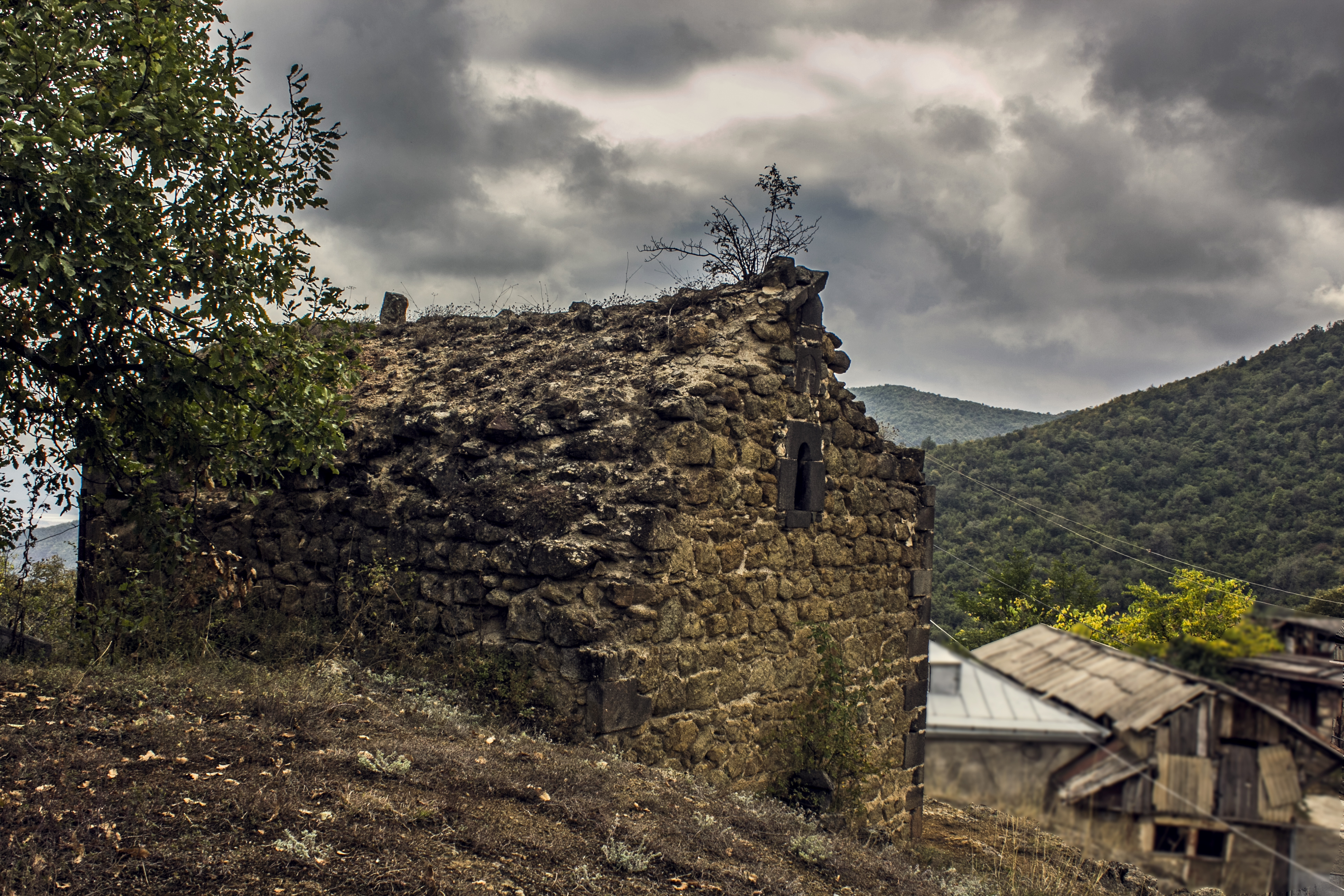
- Chapel in Arajadzor

- Location within Armenia Location within Syunik Province
- Coordinates: 39°15′44″N 46°22′21″E
- Country: Armenia
- Province: Syunik
- Municipality: Kapan

Area
  - Total: 5.49 km^{2} (2.12 sq mi)

Population (2011)
  - Total: 184
  - Density: 33.5/km^{2} (86.8/sq mi)
- Time zone: UTC+4 (AMT)

Arajadzor (Armenian: Առաջաձոր, lit. 'first valley') is a village in the Kapan Municipality of the Syunik Province in Armenia.

== Demographics ==
The Statistical Committee of Armenia reported its population as 164 in 2010, down from 208 at the 2001 census.

== Gallery ==
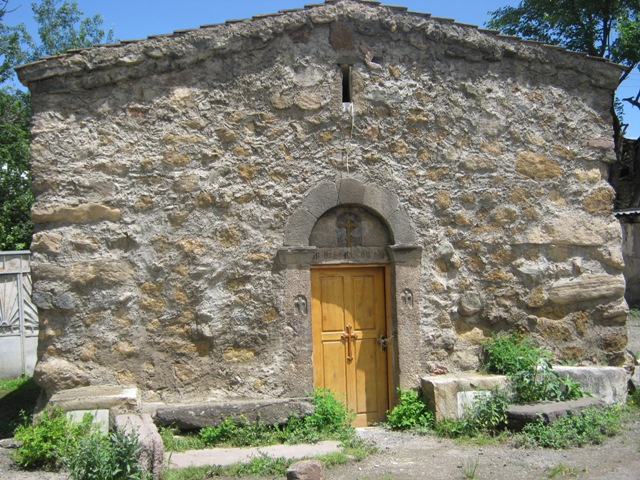
Surb Stepanos Church

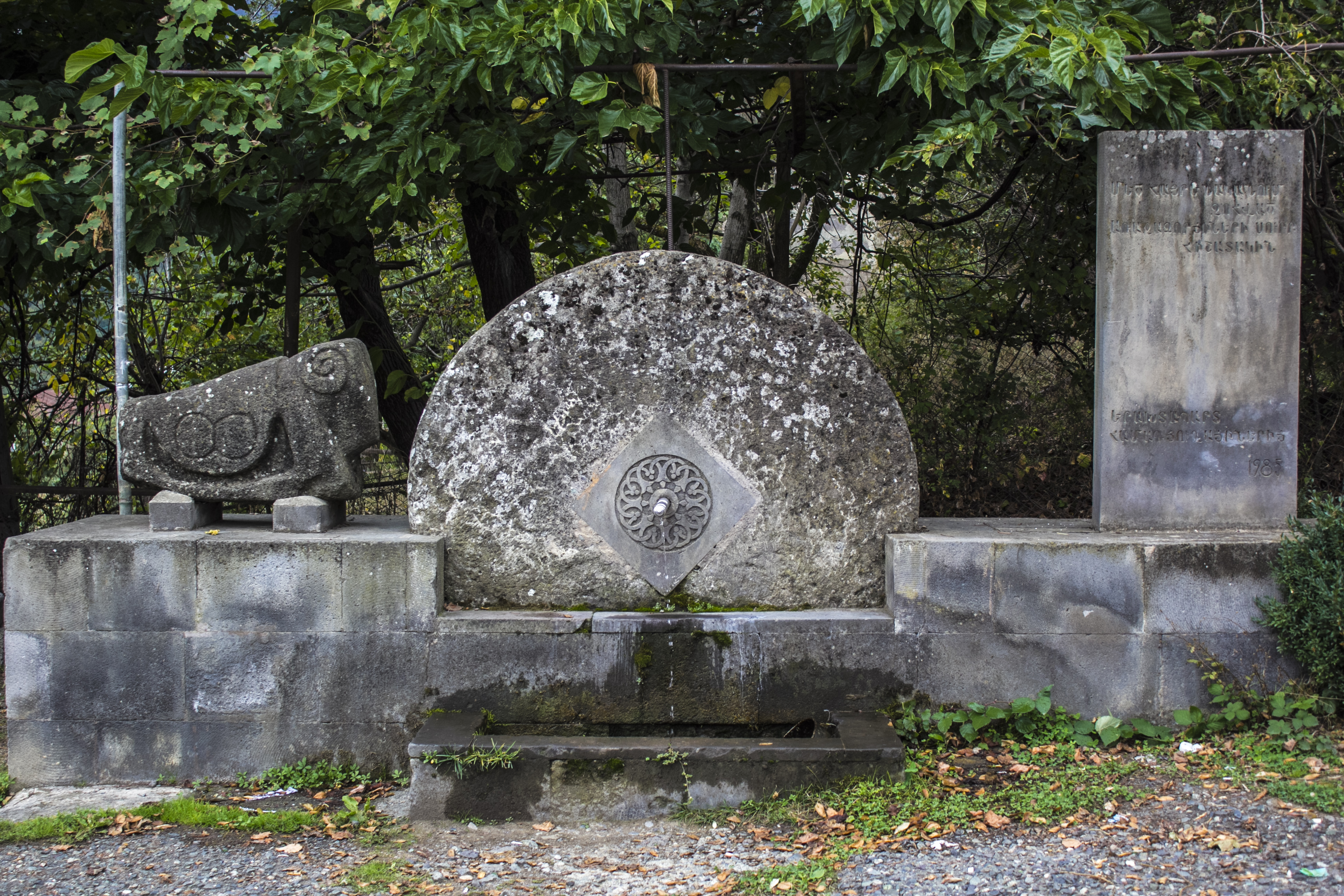
WWII memorial

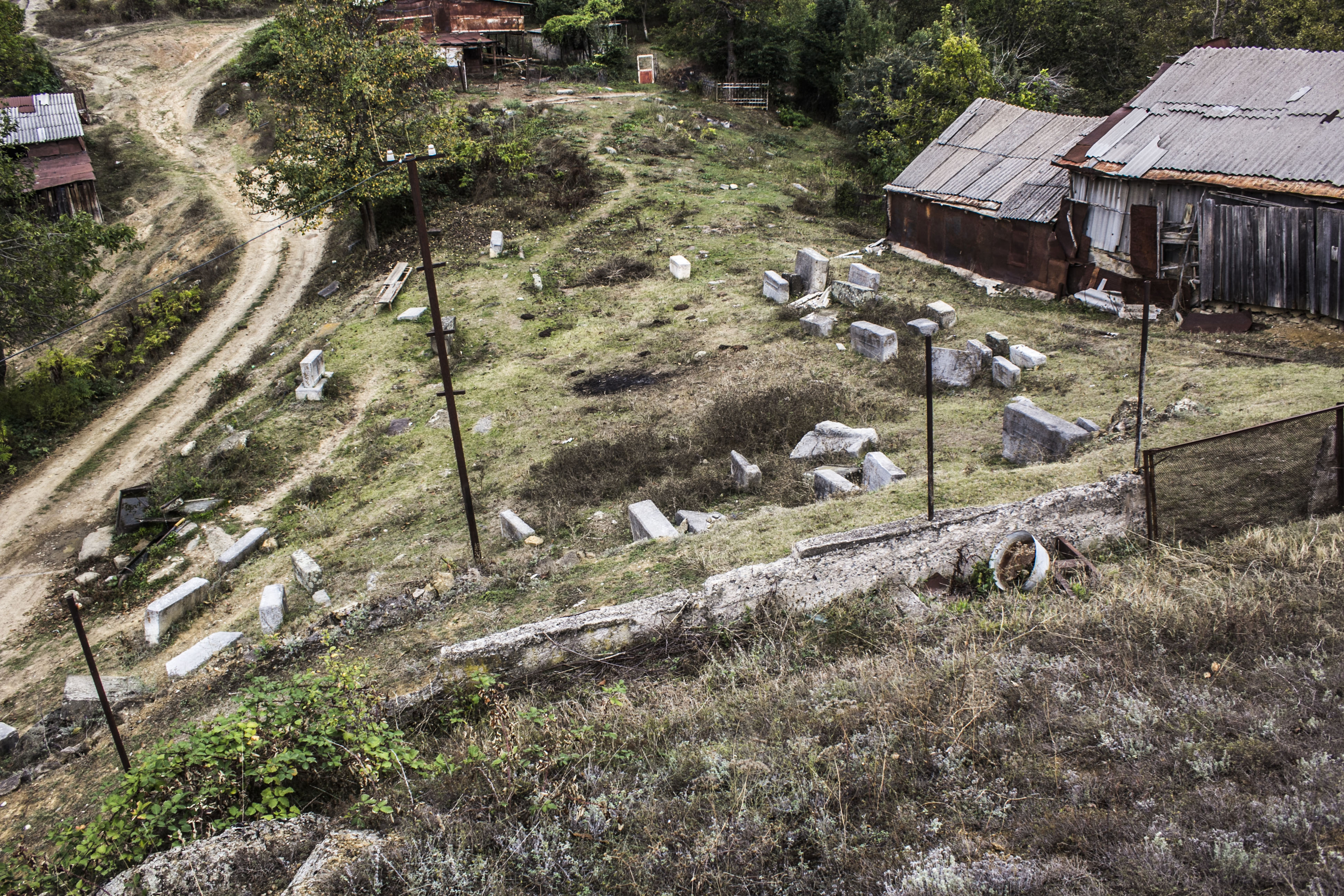
Cemetery
