= Karen Sargsyan (conductor) =

Armenian choirmaster and conductor

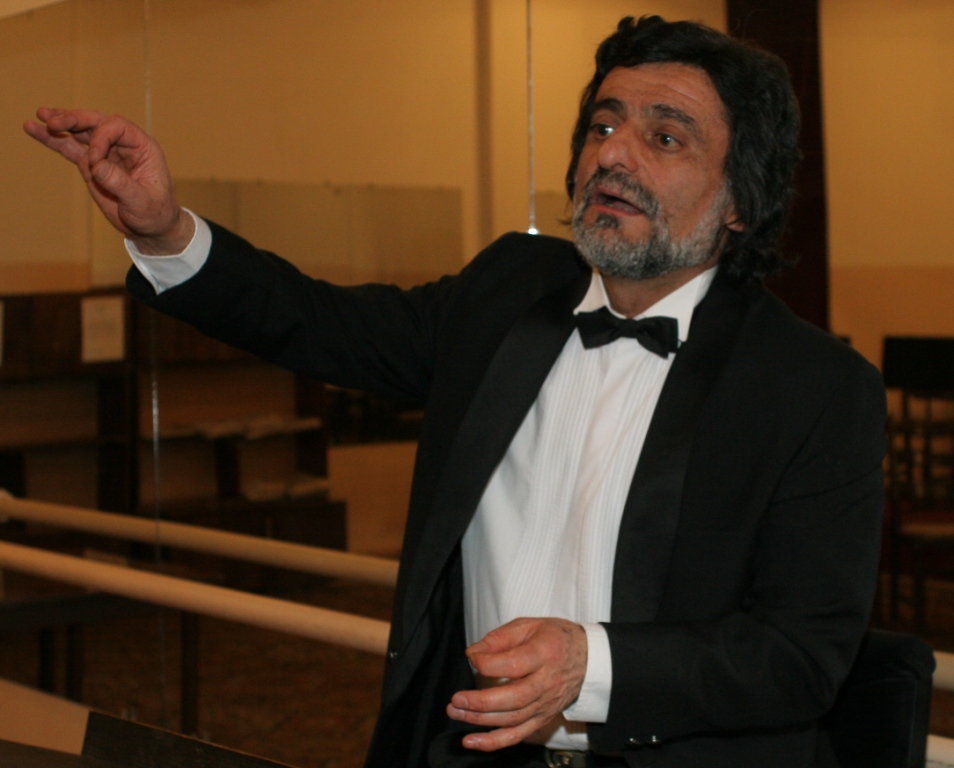
Karen Sargsyan

Karen Sargsyan is an Armenian choirmaster and conductor.

From 1972 to 1980 Sargsyan directed the choir of Yerevan State University and performed numerous concerts around Soviet Union States, including the Baltic states, Moscow and Saint Petersburg. Simultaneously, he directed the choir of the church in the "holy city" Echmiadzin.

In 1989 Sargsyan created The Male Choir of Armenian National Opera Theatre and performed concerts in West Germany (1989, 1990, 1991, 1992, 1993). In 1993 he was invited by the Armenian Diaspora of Sydney, Australia to work with the Komitas Choir and the Sydney Symphony Orchestra.

Since 1994, Sargsyan has been a principal choirmaster of the Armenian National Opera Theater. Under his direction the opera choir has performed in Moscow (1995), USA (1999), Spain (1999, 2000), Lebanon (2001) and elsewhere.

During his work at the Theatre Sargsyan has conducted operas including Otello, Il Trovatore and La Traviata by Giuseppe Verdi, Poliuto by Gaetano Donizetti, Pagliacci by Ruggero Leoncavallo, Anush by Armen Tigranian, and Arshak II by Tigran Chukhajian.

Since 1995 Sargasyan has periodically worked in Aleppo, Syria. He has recorded a full version of Armenian Holy Mass in Syria

In 2006, by the decree of the President of Armenia Robert Kocharyan, Sargsyan was awarded the title of Honored Artist of Armenia.
