= Versand Hakobyan =

Armenian politician (1950–2022)

- Վերսանդ Հակոբյան

Member of the National Assembly
- In office 2007–2012
- Constituency: District 12 (Yerevan)

Personal details
- Born: 15 September 1950 Bazarchai, Armenian SSR, Soviet Union
- Died: 19 July 2022 (aged 71)
- Party: Prosperous Armenia
- Children: 3
- Education: Kyiv Institute of Civil Aviation Engineers

Versand Fransiki Hakobyan (Armenian: Վերսանդ Ֆրանսիկի Հակոբյան; 15 September 1950 – 19 July 2022) was an Armenian aviation executive, oligarch, and politician who served in the National Assembly of Armenia as a member of Prosperous Armenia from 2007 until 2012.

== Biography ==
Hakobyan was born on 15 September 1950 in the village of Bazarchai, Syunik Province in the Armenian SSR. In 1973, Hakobyan graduated from the Kyiv Institute of Civil Aviation Engineers, and he graduated from the same institution again in 1985. From 1973 until 1994, Hakobyan worked as an engineer at Zvartnots International Airport in Yerevan, and from 1994 until 2002, he was the head of the passenger transportation department. From 2002 until 2007, he was the representative for Armenian Airlines in the United Arab Emirates.

Due to the wealth and influence of Hakobyan and his family, they were referred to as oligarchs. During his career, Hakobyan was the owner of Air Armenia alongside fellow MP Gagik Tsarukyan, and he joined his brother Hrayr Hakobyan as owner-director of Armenian International Airways and owner-director of the Yerevan Champagne Wines Factory. Additionally, the Hakobyan family together own a "network of restaurants in Yerevan and Moscow, an insurance company, a taxi service, large tracts of land, a tobacco plant and other businesses".

In the 2003 Armenian parliamentary election, Hakobyan was the Prosperous Armenia nominee in a by-election for the National Assembly of Armenia, contesting District 12, which covered part of Yerevan. Though Hakobyan was regarded as an ally of Robert Kocharyan, the president of Armenia, he was defeated by Republican Party of Armenia nominee Harutyun Gharagyozian. However, in the 2007 Armenian parliamentary election, Hakobyan was elected to the National Assembly for the same district. Prosperous Armenia chose not to renominate Hakobyan for the 2012 Armenian parliamentary election.

Hakobyan had three children. He died on 19 July 2022 from "health problems".
