= Hellas Jet =

Greek airline active 2002–2010

IATA	ICAO	Call sign
HJ	HEJ	HELLAS JET
- Founded: 2002
- Ceased operations: 2010
- Operating bases: Athens International Airport
- Secondary hubs: Heraklion Airport
- Fleet size: 6
- Destinations: 2
- Parent company: Air Miles Group
- Headquarters: Athens, Greece
- Key people: Petros Stathis (CEO)
- Website: www.hellas-jet.com

Hellas Jet was a charter airline based in Athens, Greece, operating services to Greece from destinations elsewhere in Europe. Its main base was Athens International Airport. Hellas Jet was a licensed scheduled and charter carrier, holding a JAA AOC and a Line Maintenance Certificate under JAA/EASA Part 145, both approved by the Hellenic Civil Aviation Authority. It ceased operations in 2010 due to economic difficulties. The repossession of two of its Airbus A320 aircraft, 87 and 88, was documented on Discovery channel TV programme Airplane Repo. The company slogan was More than a flight.

== History ==
The airline was started in 2002 as a Cyprus Airways subsidiary and the first flight was on 24 June 2003 from Athens. At the end of its first year of operation, it had completed 3,855 flights and carried over 250,000 passengers. Due to heavy losses, Hellas Jet suspended all scheduled flights from 10 May 2005. In January 2006, the airline announced it would refocus on charter operations. In August 2006, Cyprus Airways sold its shares to Air Miles, the trading name of Trans World Aviation. The aim was to resume services later in 2007 using wet leased Airbus A320 aircraft. It was wholly owned by Air Miles and had 50 employees (at March 2009).

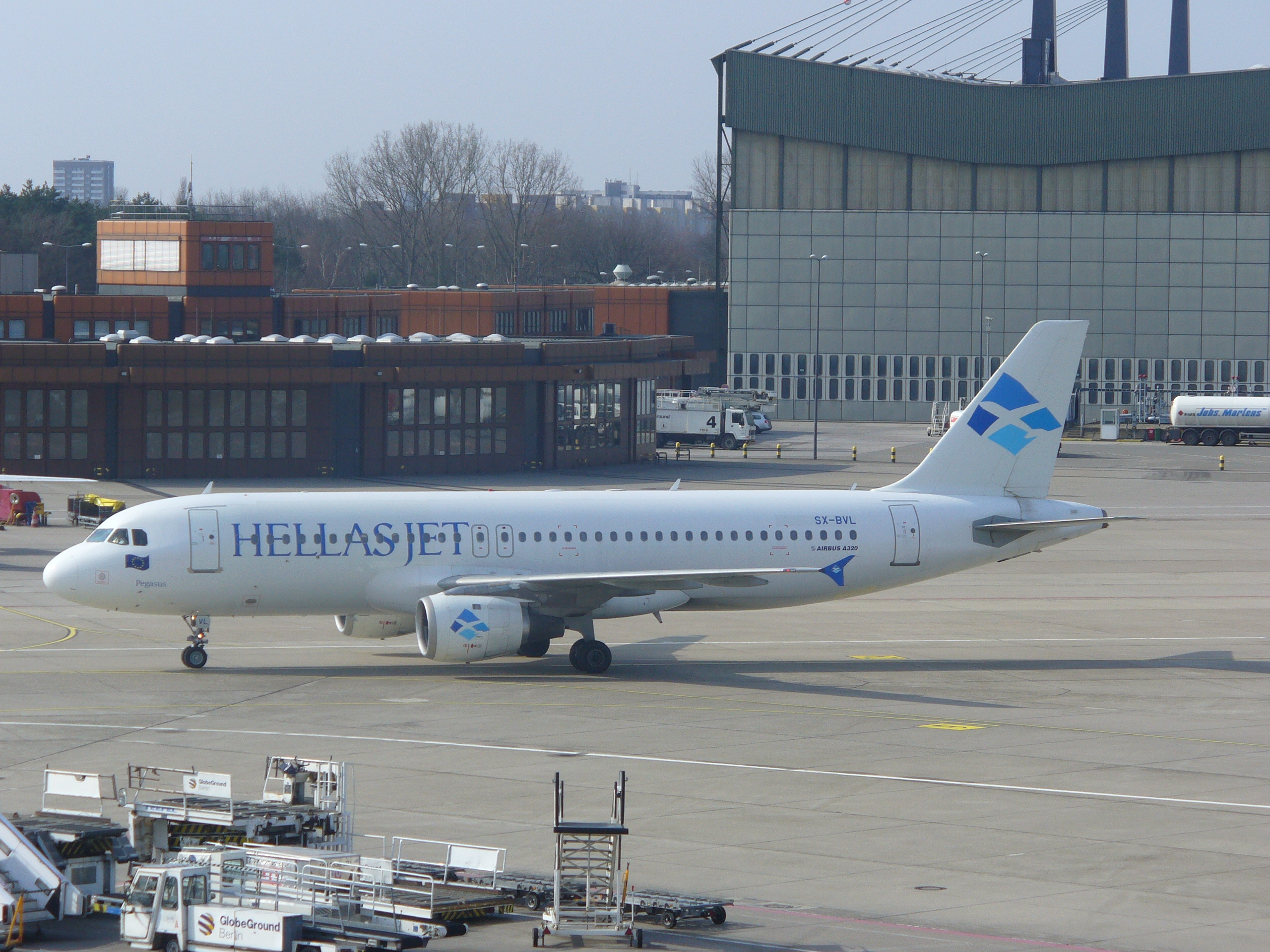
Airbus A320-200 (new livery)

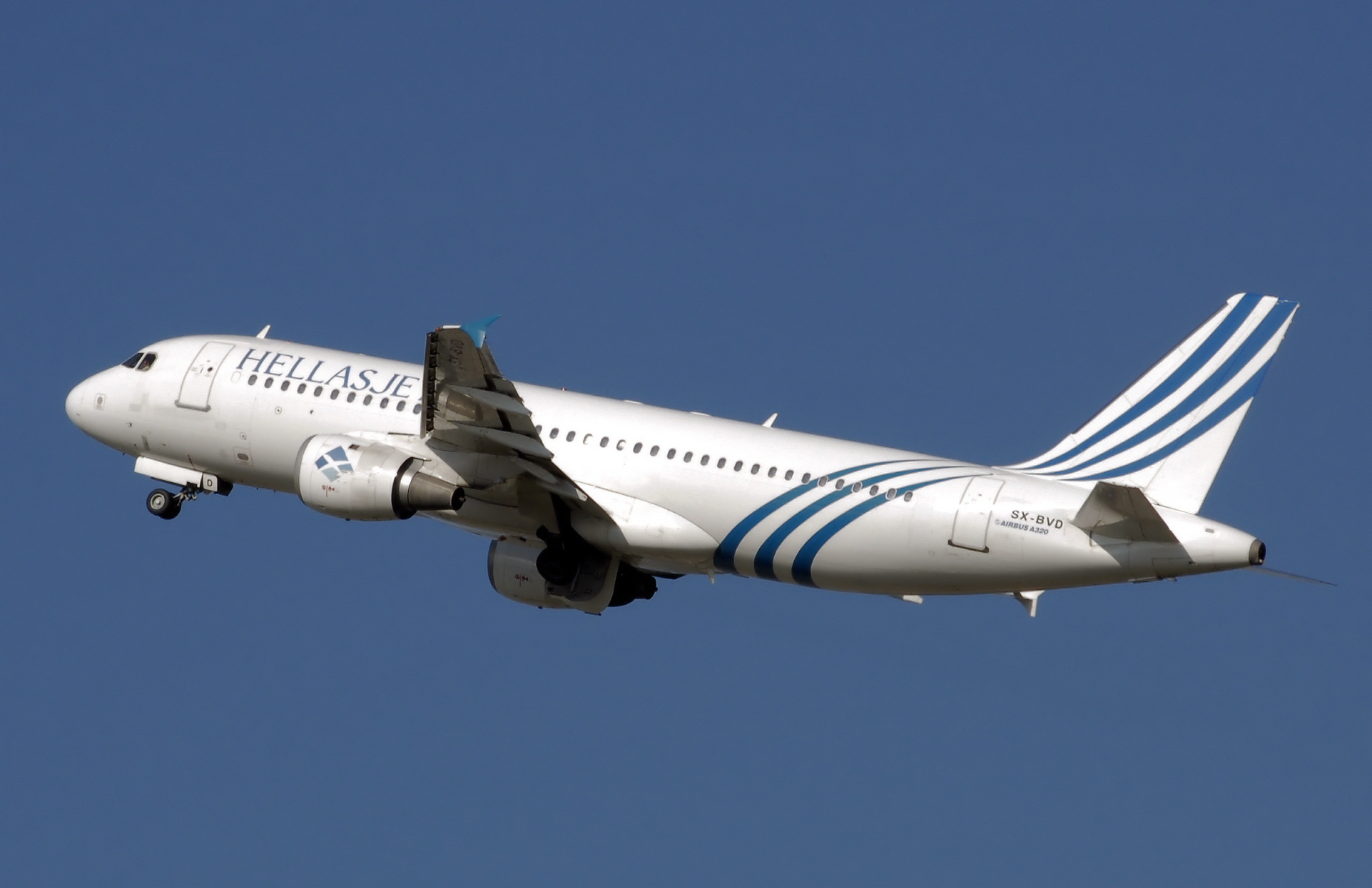
Airbus A320-200 (old livery)

Hellas Jet was an IATA member.

== Destinations ==
As a scheduled airline, Hellas Jet initially operated two flights per day from Athens to Paris and Brussels, and one per day to London Heathrow and Zurich respectively. Later the Zurich flights were suspended due to low passenger numbers and were replaced by daily flights to London Gatwick, while there was a slight reduction in the Paris and Brussels frequencies to enable two flights per week from Athens to Manchester to operate. The weekend flights to Gatwick were transferred to Heathrow in 2005, although the mid-week flights were later suspended for most of the year, except for the busy Christmas and New Year period.

As a charter airline, Hellas Jet operated charter flights to/from Heraklion and Rhodes to St. Petersburg, Moscow, Amsterdam, Düsseldorf, Paris etc. One aircraft also flew from Dublin to holiday destinations in Spain on behalf of Trans Aer. Its fleet was available for both scheduled charters as well as ad-hoc charter flights.

== Fleet ==
Hellas Jet commenced operations with a fleet of three Airbus A320-232 aircraft, registered SX-BVA, SX-BVB and SX-BVC, leased from CIT Aerospace. BVA was built in 1992, the other two were brand new. They had been acquired on three-year leases. Their initial configuration was for 148 passengers (16 business class and 132 economy class), all with leather seats.

When the company ceased scheduled services, the aircraft were reconfigured in Malta to have a single class layout with 174 moquette-trimmed seats.

SX-BVB was destroyed by fire in Brussels in May 2006. The other two planes were returned to the lessor in June 2006 and subsequently, BVA went to Thomas Cook Airlines Belgium and BVC to Air Astana of Kazakhstan.

Then Hellas-Jet leased two other used A320s, this time with CFM engines. One came from LatCharter and the other from USA3000, and they retained their colour schemes with Hellas Jet titles. A further A320 was acquired from LatCharter, registered SX-BVD, with LatCharter colours but with Hellas Jet titles and the HellasJet logo on the engines.

In its final years, the Hellas Jet fleet consisted of the following aircraft (at 29 September 2009):

- 2 × Airbus A320-212 reg. SX-BVK and SX-BVL, with CFM engines and full Hellas Jet livery. These aircraft were eventually repossessed and returned to the lessor in the United States after the airline defaulted on their payments.
- 4 × Fokker 50 for a subsidiary company named Hellas Aviation, acquired to operate domestic flights to the Greek Islands, but this company never actually commenced commercial operations and the Fokkers were sold.

== Accidents and incidents ==
On 5 May 2006, a Hellas Jet Airbus A320 was destroyed in a fire in the Sabena Technics hangar at Brussels Airport in Belgium. The plane was one of the three Airbus A320s destroyed, one belonging to Armavia, one to Armenian International Airways, and one Lockheed C-130 owned by the Belgian Air Component.
