= Armavia Flight 967 =

2006 aviation accident in the Black Sea

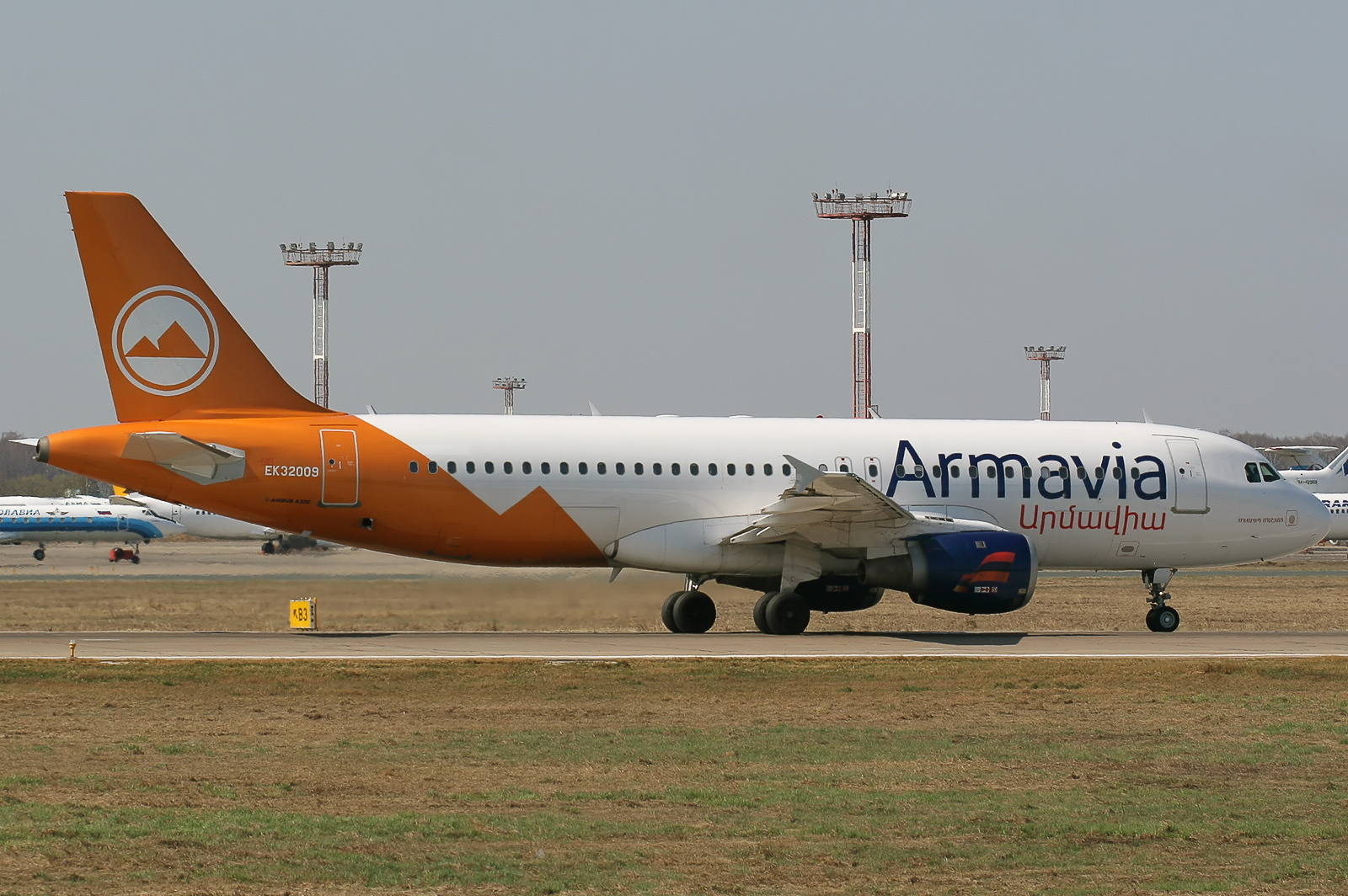
- EK-32009, the aircraft involved in the accident, seen in April 2006

Accident
- Date: 3 May 2006
- Summary: Controlled flight into water due to pilot error and ATC error aggravated by psycho-emotional stress
- Site: Black Sea, near Adler-Sochi International Airport, Sochi, Russia; 43°23′51″N 39°51′27″E

Aircraft
- Aircraft type: Airbus A320-211
- Aircraft name: Mesrop Mashtots
- Operator: Armavia
- IATA flight No.: U8967
- ICAO flight No.: RNV967
- Call sign: ARMAVIA 967
- Registration: EK-32009
- Flight origin: Zvartnots International Airport, Zvartnots, Armenia
- Destination: Sochi International Airport, Sochi, Russia
- Occupants: 113
- Passengers: 105
- Crew: 8
- Fatalities: 113
- Survivors: 0

Armavia Flight 967 was a scheduled international passenger flight operated by Armavia from Zvartnots International Airport, Zvartnots in Armenia to Sochi, a Black Sea coastal resort city in Russia. On 3 May 2006, the aircraft operating the route, an Airbus A320, crashed into the sea while attempting a go-around following its first approach to Sochi airport; all 113 aboard were killed. The accident was the first major commercial airline crash in 2006. It was Armavia's only fatal accident during the airline's existence.

== Flight ==
The aircraft took off from Zvartnots International Airport (EVN) at a scheduled departure time at 01:45 Armenian Daylight Time (20:45 UTC, May 2), with a scheduled arrival time at Sochi International Airport (AER) of 02:00 Moscow Daylight Time (22:00 UTC, May 2).

To make their decision for departure, the crew obtained the observed weather data and the weather forecast for the takeoff, landing, and alternate aerodromes, all of which met the requirements for IFR flights. All the crew were correctly licensed and adequately rested to operate the flight.

The airplane took off from Zvartnots airport at 20:47 with 113 occupants on board: 105 passengers (including five children and one infant), two pilots, one aircraft engineer, and five flight attendants. Takeoff, climb, and cruise were uneventful.

The first communication between Sochi approach controller and the crew took place at 21:10. At that moment, the airplane was beyond the coverage area of the Sochi radar. Until 21:17, the approach controller and the crew discussed the observed and forecast weather, and as a result, the crew decided to return to Yerevan. At 21:26, after the decision had already been made, the crew asked the controller about the latest observed weather. At 21:30, the controller informed the crew that visibility was 3,600 metres (2.2 mi) and the cloud ceiling was 170 m (560 ft). At 21:31, the crew decided to continue the flight to Sochi airport.

The next communication with the approach controller was at 22:00. The aircraft then was descending to an altitude of 3,600 m (11,800 ft) and was being tracked by the Sochi radar. The approach controller cleared the flight for a descent to 1,800 m (5,900 ft) and reported the observed weather at Sochi, as at 22:00, for runway 06, which was above the minima.

The crew was then handed over to the holding and tower controllers, and was cleared for descent to 600 m (2,000 ft), before entering the turn to the final approach. Whilst performing the turn, the runway extended centreline was overshot. After eliminating the deviation, the crew started descending the aircraft along the glide slope, following the approach pattern. At 22:10, the crew reported that the gear was down and that they were ready for landing. In response, they were advised that they were 10 kilometres (6.2 mi; 5.4 nmi) from the airport and that the weather was now 4,000 m (13,000 ft) visibility and 190 m (620 ft) cloud ceiling, and were cleared to land. About 30 seconds later, the controller advised the crew of the observed cloud ceiling at 100 m (330 ft) and instructed them to cease their descent, abandon the landing attempt, and carry out a right turn and climb to 600 m (2,000 ft) and also to contact the holding controller, who would give instructions for entering the airport's holding pattern. The last communication with the crew was at 22:12. After that, the crew did not respond to any of the controller's calls. At 22:13, the aircraft struck the water, and broke up on impact.

== Aircraft ==
The aircraft involved was an A320 built in France, with its first flight in June 1995. It had an MSN number of 547 with a test registration code of F-WWIU. The aircraft was delivered in 1995 to Ansett Australia, registered in Australia as VH-HYO. It was acquired by Armavia in 2004 registered as EK-32009 with its name as Mesrop Mashtots. Armavia repainted the aircraft with its new livery on 31 October 2004. The aircraft had flown more than 10,000 hours before the crash.

== Passengers and crew ==
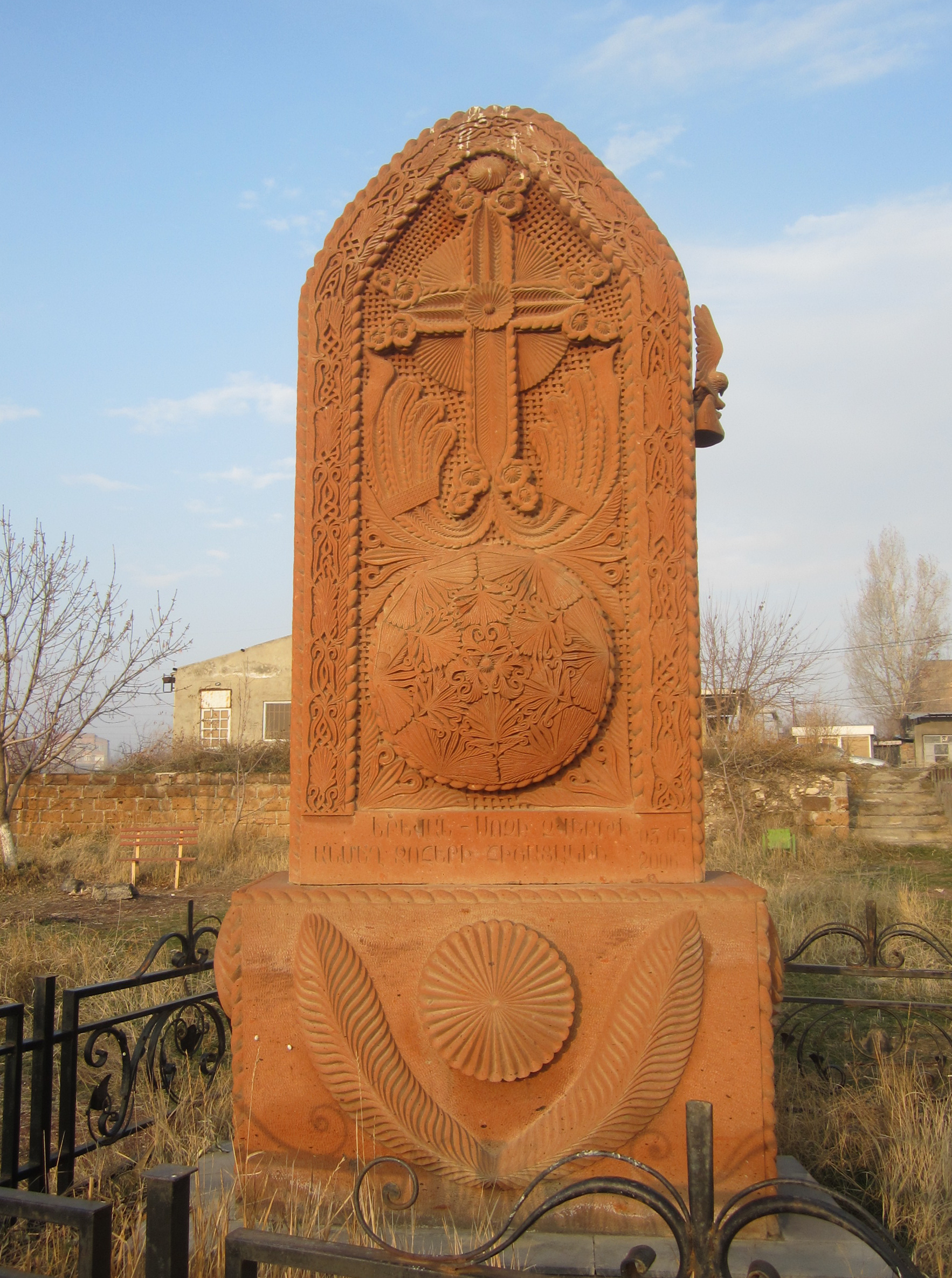
A monument for the 113 victims lost on Flight 967

Most of the passengers were citizens of Armenia. According to reports, the flight had 85 Armenian citizens, 26 Russian citizens, one Georgian citizen, and one Ukrainian.

Citizenship of the passengers and crew

Nationality	Passengers	Crew	Total
Armenia	77	8	85
Russia	26	0	26
Georgia	1	0	1
Ukraine	1	0	1
Total	105	8	113

The captain of Flight 967 was 40-year-old Grigor Grigoryan. Born in 1966, he had completed his primary training in Krasnokutsk Civil Flight School. He graduated in 1986 and also graduated from Moscow Institute of Civil Aviation Engineers. He joined Balaklavsky United as a co-pilot in 1986. He then joined Ararat Airlines in 1997 as a captain of Yakovlev Yak-40s. He then joined Armavia as a co-pilot of Airbus A320s in 2004 and subsequently promoted to a captain in 2005. He had passed a test for an Airbus A320 captain in SAS Flight Academy in Stockholm, Sweden, with satisfactory results. Captain Grigoryan had a total of 5,458 hours of flight experience, including 1,436 hours on the Airbus A320.

The first officer (co-pilot) of Flight 967 was 29-year-old Arman Davtyan. He was born in 1977 and had completed his primary training in Ulyanovsk Civil Flying School and graduated in 1999. He then joined Chernomor-Avia in December 2001 as a co-pilot of Tupolev Tu-154s. He joined Armavia in 2002, joined Armenian Airlines in 2004, and then joined Armavia again in the same year. First Officer Davtyan had passed a training course for an Airbus A320 in SAS Flight Academy in Stockholm, Sweden, with satisfactory results. He had 2,185 flight hours, with 1,022 of them on the A320.

== Recovery efforts ==
Flight 967 disappeared from Sochi's radar at 02:13 local time. Chief of Flight Operation N.G Savelyev alerted all the search-and-rescue services in the area and deployed an Mi-8 helicopter. At 02:19, Russia's Minister of Emergencies was informed of the disappearance of Flight 967. A search helicopter was ready for takeoff to find the missing flight, but was not allowed by Sochi due to the deteriorating weather. The search-and-rescue operation was then suspended. At 04:08, the Ministry of Emergency's boat Valery Zamarayez found the probable crash area. Rescuers then went to the search area. From 07:30 to 12:30, the search-and-rescue team recovered 9 body parts from the crash site.

Search-and-rescue personnel only managed to recover some of the flight's debris. They recovered the Airbus' nose, landing gear, fin, elevator, and several other fragments. Wiring and electronic units were also found. In total, 52 body fragments were found by the team, as well. The Bureau of Enquiry and Analysis for Civil Aviation Safety (BEA) noted that at the time when Flight 967 impacted the sea, the landing gear was extended. The lower part of the rudder was severely damaged due to the impact forces. Several parts of the aircraft elevator were also damaged. Some of the aircraft parts recovered from the sea were severely deformed.

== Causes ==
=== Harmony ===
The pilot had indicated unhappiness with the late hour of the flight and the automated procedures or techniques of the autopilot. The pilot used some inputs and adjustments that appeared to be aimed at gaining command of the flight over what the automated systems had to offer. His attitude towards the aircraft and his lack of communication when making adjustments may have put additional strain on the first officer. Numerous deviations from standard procedures occurred once the captain was instructed to break off his landing approach and make a turn. The deviations combined with the lack of inputs and actions resulted in the aircraft not doing all things desired of it and also sounding a number of warnings.

=== Weather ===
The weather at the time was considered to be fine; low pressure was present near Sochi. A cold front was also detected and was forming in the Caucasian Edge and further to the east of Turkey at the time. Rain was also present in Adler (Sochi). In the spring transition period, low clouds often occurred in the Caucasian Edge, which could have limited visibility for the pilots. This proved to be dangerous, as most controlled flight into terrain (CFIT) occurs due to this kind of cloud (which obscures the pilots' visual reference).

Prior to takeoff from Yerevan, the crew was briefed on the weather conditions in Sochi. At the time, the weather in Sochi was fine. After the takeoff of Flight 967, the pilots were given another weather briefing. It was still in good condition, with considerable clouds, mist, and light rain. The weather at the time would not have allowed for a vortex (i.e. storm, tornado, downdraft). In the following hours, the probability that a vortex might occur was reduced to zero. By the time Flight 967 entered Sochi, the weather conditions had deteriorated. A cold front wave occurred in Sochi, producing a cumulonimbus cloud. The rain intensified, and the visibility was reduced to 1,500 m. For several minutes, the weather became better for landing. The controllers instructed Flight 967 to abort their descent and conduct a go-around immediately, as low clouds were present at Sochi International Airport. Shortly afterwards, Flight 967 disappeared from Sochi radar.

=== Recorders analysis ===
Shortly after Flight 967 hit the water, the radio beacon signals, known as the emergency locator transmitter, started to sound. French BEA retrieved the submerged cockpit voice recorder (CVR) and flight data recorder (FDR) from the Black Sea and found only minor damage to both recorders. BEA later examined both the CVR and the FDR.

==== Examination ====
The flight was uneventful until the approach, but during the cruise stage of the flight, First Officer Davtyan stated: "[Expletive] it.. who operates such flights with the jitter and not enough sleep." The BEA also noted that neither pilot understood how the autopilot of an Airbus A320 works. Analysis of the internal communications at this stage of the flight shows that Captain Grigoryan was annoyed by the fact that in DESCENT mode (managed mode), the descent rate was not as high as he expected. BEA noted that in this mode, the descent rate is calculated automatically, depending on a number of parameters describing the descent, e.g. the aircraft attitude in relation to the preset profile and so on.

Flight 967 was then instructed by Sochi tower to pass waypoint GUKIN and TABAN. It then passed both waypoints. While banking to turn to final approach, the rain started. First Officer Davtyan then reacted by saying exclamation words, possibly due to emotional stress. The Sochi controller then told the crew of Flight 967 that the weather in Sochi had deteriorated, and instructed the pilot to abort their descent. The crew reacted to this report, responding with negative words and expletives to the controller. The crew had been discussing the issue for three minutes, swearing about the controller's actions even between the items on the checklist.

The aircraft climbed and started to bank, and the flaps were extended to 18°. At this point, Captain Grigoryan was heard in the CVR saying: "[Expletive] him" to the Sochi controller. The crew then contacted Sochi's holding controller and the final controller. They then selected the "glide-slope capture" descent mode, which is an automatic descent. The aircraft was descending with two engaged autopilots and engaged autothrust. The speed was controlled by the autothrust at the target speed of 137 kn (254 km/h), stabilised on the glide slope, in the landing configuration, and ready for landing. The crew then proceeded to the landing checklist.

Sochi tower instructed them to abort their descent and conduct a go-around, as low clouds had formed near the airport. The aircraft climbed, the thrust levers were moved to climb position, the flaps and slats remained fully extended, and the landing gear remained fully extended. A few minutes later, the "Speed Speed Speed" (low energy) warning sounded, which advises the crew that "the aircraft energy is decreasing to the limit, below which the engine thrust must be increased to regain a positive angle of the flight path". At the moment when the aural warning sounded, the aircraft altitude was 1,150 ft (350 m), the crew then pushed the TO/GA button.

BEA stated that none of the crew's actions were important and necessary for a go-around procedure, such as extending the flaps and the landing gear. This demonstrated that at that time, both flight crewmen's' conditions were not at the optimum level. BEA also suspected that the low energy warning was not detected or noticed by the crew.

The autopilot was then disengaged by the crew, as they cast doubts on the autopilot (on the cruise stage of the flight, First Officer Davtyan joked about the autopilot, stating that Captain Grigoryan's autopilot was better than him, indicating that they had doubts about the autopilot and suspected that it was not functioning properly.) Captain Grigoryan then banked the aircraft to the right.

Both crew members then became more physically and emotionally stressed, as further conversations among them revealed that their intonations became higher and higher. The aircraft then decreased its pitch-up attitude and banked to the right. Then, one of the crew stepped on the rudder pedals, causing the rudder to deflect. This was not necessary. The BEA suspected that Captain Grigoryan unknowingly stepped on the pedals, while under psychoemotional stress.

BEA then found that the crew may have been suffering a somatogravic illusion in flight. Somatogravic illusion, in aviation, is a type of optical illusion that can cause the crew to think that they are pitching up, while in reality, they are not. This could happen during night-time flying (causing the crew to lose their visual reference, as it was dark) accompanied by the lack of monitoring of the flight's indicator. Somatogravic illusion was responsible for the crash of Gulf Air Flight 072 in Bahrain. The BEA also suspected the specific features of the speed indication on the PFD, especially speed limitations for the Airbus A320 configuration that are shown as the red bars at the top of the speed indication strip. One of the crew members might have adopted the reflex acquired in training, for example, in response to a TCAS warning when the pilot is anxious to avoid the displayed red part of the instrument scale, which may result in the instinctive forward movement of the side stick, especially when the pilot is in a state of psycho-emotional strain. This version is substantiated by the fact that the pilot was monitoring the flight speed and its limitations (VFE) that depended on the Airbus A320 configuration and retracted the flaps and slats in a timely manner, and the control inputs on the side stick coincided with the moments when the current speed was getting close to the limit value. Neither of these probable causes has enough evidence, however.

The crew of Flight 967 then communicated with Sochi tower. Their words were not completed; "Sochi Radar, Armavia 967...". This was the last communication from Flight 967, as Captain Grigoryan ordered First Officer Davtyan to fully extend the flaps.

After First Officer Davtyan extended the flaps to full, a few seconds later, the master warning sounded, and continued to do so until the end of the recording. The speed at the time was too fast, which could tear the flaps apart and could cause the plane to crash, similar to Austral Lineas Aereas Flight 2553. The plane was banking to the right. Flight 967 began a nose-down attitude and the flaps then retracted to 18°. Captain Grigoryan then made an 11° nose-down input, causing the plane to descend even further.

Captain Grigoryan aggravated the condition further by making a right bank input, causing the plane to bank severely to the right, with a roll angle of 39°. The ground proximity warning system (GPWS) then sounded. First Officer Davtyan then ordered Captain Grigoryan to level off. At this moment, First Officer Davtyan intervened and moved the stick to the left position (20° to the left) to counter the increasing right bank, while Captain Grigoryan continued making his control inputs to increase the right bank. Apparently, First Officer Davtyan was trying to counter the bank only, as he also made a nose-down input, causing the plane to descend even further.

While intervening, First Officer Davtyan had not pressed the take-over push button, so both pilot's control inputs were added and prohibited. This is known as dual input. Such dual piloting is prohibited. The dual-input warning should have sounded at the time, but because its priority is lower than the GPWS, it did not, and so neither pilot knew that he was making dual inputs on the aircraft.

The crew's attention might have been distracted by the controller's direction. The controller was sending the crew a 20-second-long message. While the plane was descending, one of the crew members suddenly moved the thrust lever way back, into its idle position, and then moved the thrust lever forward, causing the autothrottle to disengage. The crew then desperately tried to lift the plane up, but the plane hit water at a speed of 285 kn (528 km/h; 328 mph), killing all on board.

=== Primary conclusions of the final accident report ===
The crash of Armavia Flight 967 was a controlled flight into terrain, specifically water, while conducting a climbing maneuver after an aborted approach to Sochi airport at night with weather conditions below landing minimums for runway 06.

While performing the climb with the autopilot disengaged, the captain, being in a psychoemotional stress condition, made nose-down control inputs due to the loss of pitch and roll awareness. This started the abnormal situation. The captain's insufficient pitch-control inputs led to a failure to recover the aircraft and caused it to crash.

Along with the inadequate control inputs from the captain, the contributing factors of the crash were also the lack of monitoring the aircraft's pitch attitude, altitude, and vertical speed by the first officer and no proper reaction by the crew to GPWS warnings.

=== Contributory factors and shortcomings ===
Contributory factors and shortcomings
Time	Factor or shortcoming	Applicable policy
	During descent and approach, the crew constantly held conversations having nothing to do with the operation of the aircraft.	
	The flight crew techniques manual for the A320, which was approved by the Civil Aviation Administration of the Republic of Armenia and according to which the captain passed his training before starting flights with the airline, does not contain the requirement for passing the upgrade to captain programme. The captain did not pass this training. This training programme was made mandatory in the next revision of the manual.	A320 Flight Crew Techniques Manual
	The flight operations department of Armavia does not comply with the requirement that airlines analyse flight operations with the use of the FDR and CVR recordings for aircraft with the certified maximum takeoff weight exceeding 27,000 kilograms (60,000 lb). As such, completely evaluating the professional skill levels of the flight crew members was impossible.	ROLRGA RA Section 11.2 and ICAO Annex 6 Part 1 Chapter 3
	Armavia does not keep records on the approaches and landings in complicated weather conditions performed by their captains.	ROLRGA RA-2000 Sections 4.5.33 and 6.1.5
21:16	Sochi approach control advised the crew of the trend weather forecast for landing as 1,500 m (0.93 mi) visibility and 150 m (490 ft) cloud ceiling, and did not identify the trend as "at times". This inaccuracy while reporting the weather to the crew was not directly connected with the cause of the aircraft accident, but it influenced the initial decision of the crew to return to Zvartnots.	
22:01	The approach controller advised the crew of the observed weather at Sochi and by mistake said the cloud ceiling was "considerable" at 1,800 m (5,900 ft), instead of 180 m (590 ft), but this did not influence the captain's decision.	
22:03	The crew did not report (and the holding controller did not request them to report) the selected system and mode of instrument approach.	Holding Controller's Operation Manual, Section 4, item 4.2.1
22:11	The final controller at Sochi was informed by the weather observer of the current observed weather: A cloud ceiling of 100 m (330 ft), below the established minimums (cloud ceiling 170 m (560 ft) and visibility 2,500 m (1.6 mi)). Based on this information, the final controller instructed the crew: "Abort descent, clouds at 100 m [330 ft], right-hand turn, climb to 600 m [2,000 ft]", instructions not compliant with regulations. However, the controller had a right to order the go-around.	Civil Flight Operations Guidance 85 Section 6.5.16 and the Final Controller's Operation Manual, items 4.3 and 4.3.1
	The controller had a right to order the go-around.	The AIP of Russia
	The weather forecast for Sochi for the period from 18:00 to 03:00 was not verified with regard to visibility in the "at times" group.	
22:11	The weather observer did not complete the special weather report when the cloud ceiling descended to 100 m (330 ft), though to do so was required.	Guidance for Meteorological Support in Civil Aviation 95, Sections 4.3.1 and 4.4.1 d; Instruction for meteorological support at Sochi; Criteria for Issuance of a Special Weather Report, Annex 8
	The recommendation for ATIS broadcast was not entirely fulfilled.	Federal Air Transport Administration and Hydrometeorology and Environment Monitoring Service Joint Order No. 62/41 "On approval and implementation of Instruction for ATIS broadcast content in English and Russian" of 20 March 2000
	In the course of reading out FDR data, a number of discrepancies were found in the documentation describing the logic of binary signal recordings.	
	While performing manoeuvres in the landing configuration with the autopilot and autothrust engaged, the low-energy warning may sound, which Airbus considers as an abnormal situation.	

== Safety recommendations ==
To eliminate the shortcomings revealed during investigation of this accident, the final accident report made 22 safety recommendations:

Number of Recommendations	Target
5	Aviation administrations of the CIS countries
1	Aviation administrations of the CIS countries jointly with industrial and scientific and research organizations
6	Civil Aviation Administration of Armenia and Armavia airline administration
2	Federal Air Navigation Service of the Russian Federation
2	Federal Service for Hydrometeorology and Environmental Monitoring
2	Federal State Unitary Enterprise “State Corporation for Air Traffic Management"
4	Airbus Industrie

== See also ==
- List of accidents and incidents involving commercial aircraft
- Ethiopian Airlines Flight 409
- Flydubai Flight 981, a case where the flight failed to conduct a go-around at Rostov Airport as the pilots had a lost situational awareness and nosedived at the runaway, killing all 62 occupants aboard.
- Air China Flight 129
- Afriqiyah Airways Flight 771
- Gulf Air Flight 072, a case nearly identical in circumstances to Flight 967, where an Airbus A320 impacted the sea during a go-around at night.
- Northwest Airlink Flight 5719
- Kenya Airways Flight 507
- 2016 Russian Defence Ministry Tupolev Tu-154 crash, a plane that crashed in 2016 near Flight 967 site.
