= Air Armenia =

Armenian airline

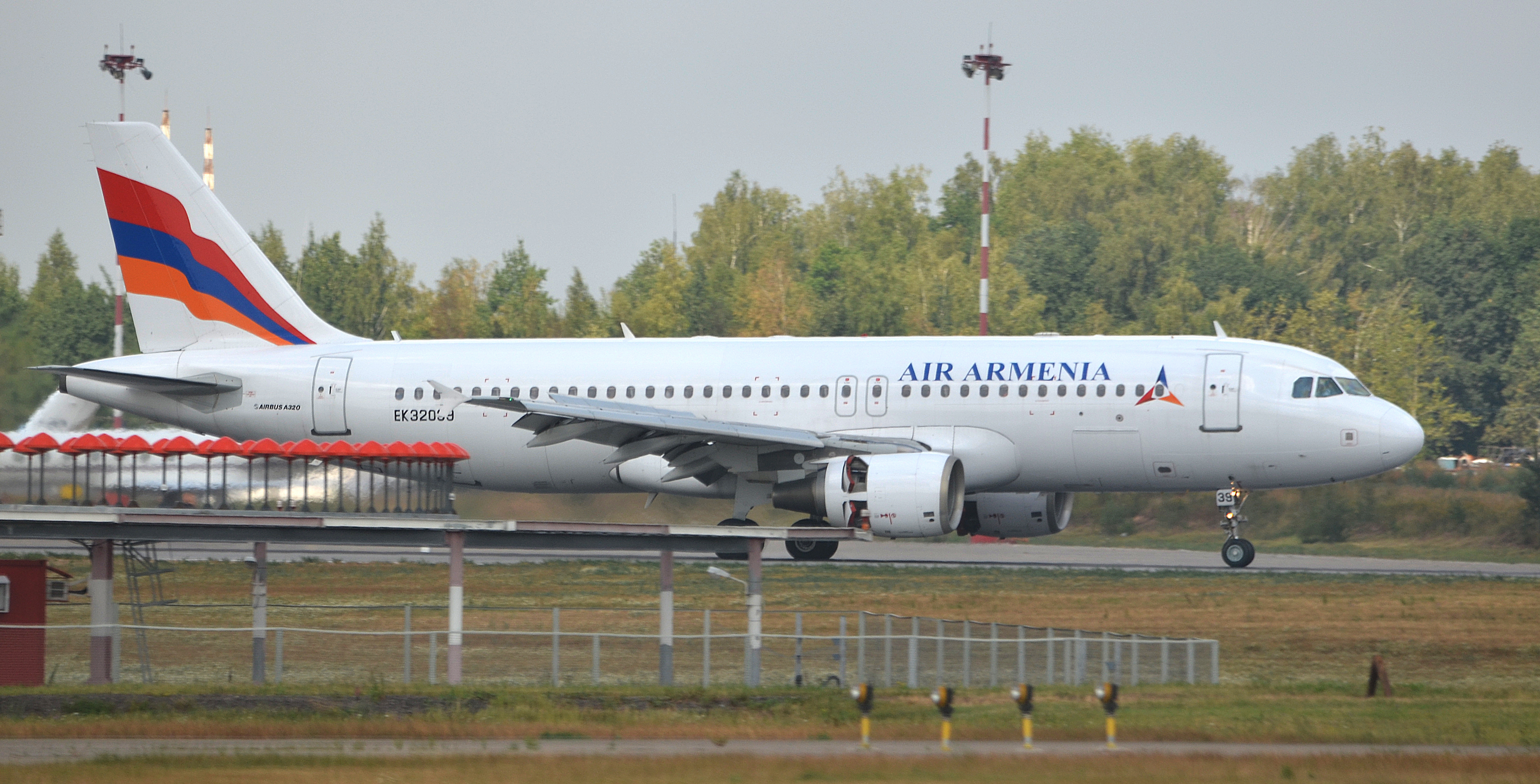
- Airbus A320
IATA	ICAO	Call sign
QN	ARR	AIR ARMENIA
- Founded: 2003
- Ceased operations: 2014; 12 years ago
- Hubs: Zvartnots International Airport
- Fleet size: 0
- Destinations: 10
- Headquarters: Yerevan, Armenia

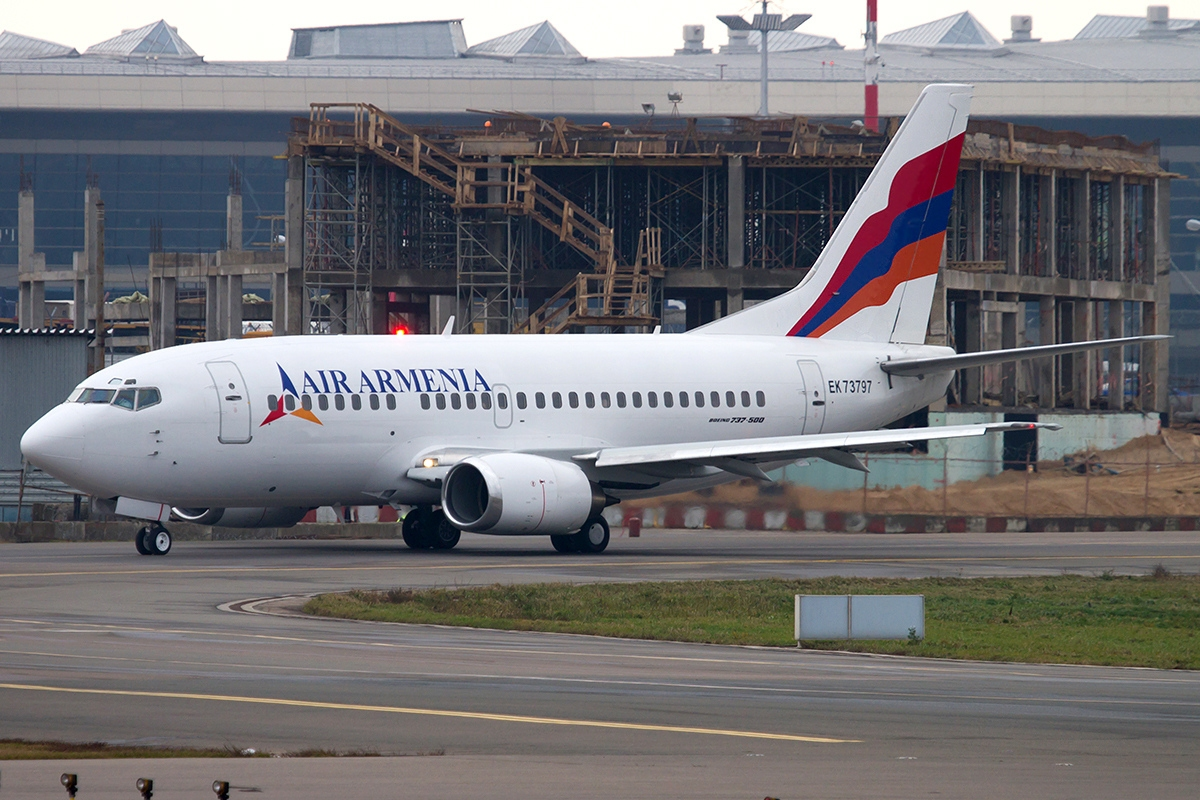
Boeing 737-500

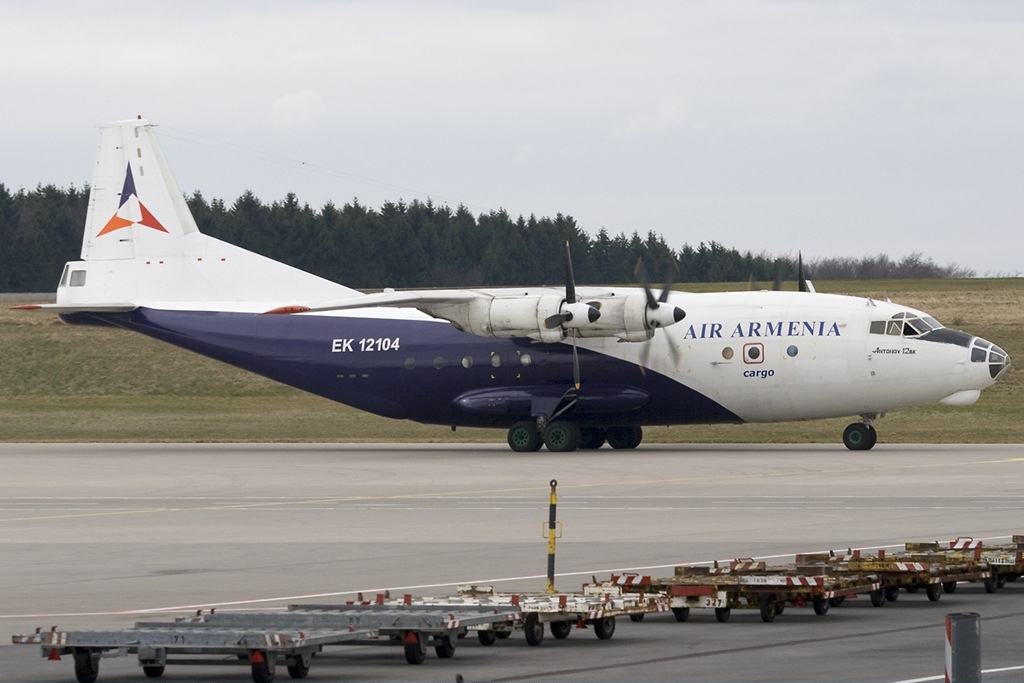
Antonov An-12BK

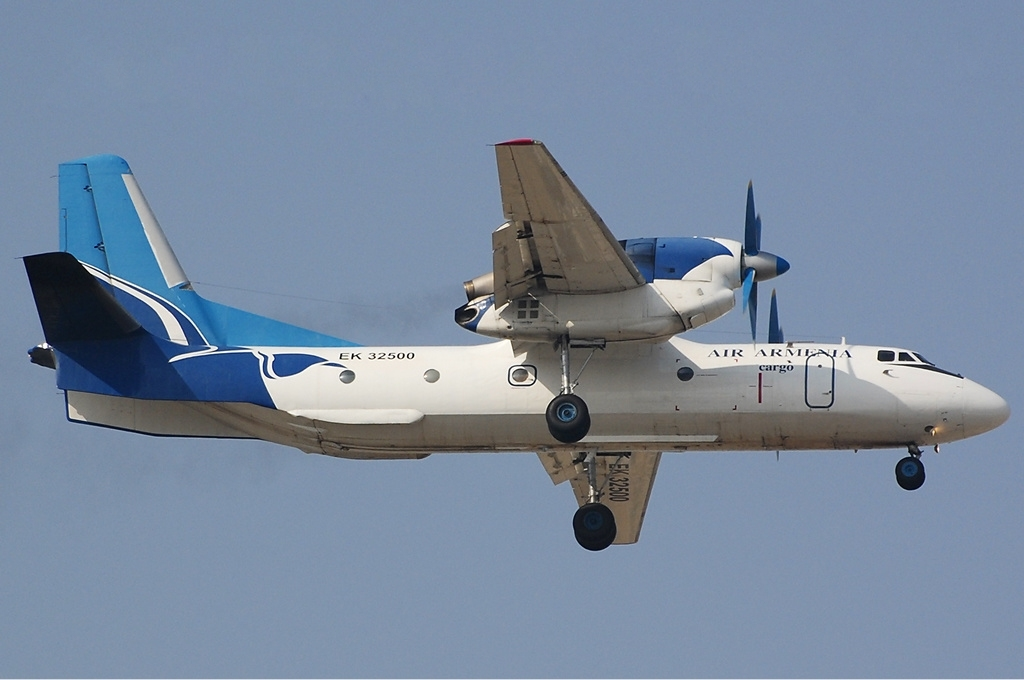
Antonov An-32B

Air Armenia CJSC (Armenian: Էյր Արմենիա) was an Armenian airline headquartered in Yerevan, Armenia. It was established in 2003 as a cargo airlene because of the ownership of exclusive passenger airline right by Armavia for ten years. The company expanded into passenger services following Armavia's bankruptcy in 2013 and became the biggest airline in Armenia at that time. However, financial difficulties forced Air Armenia to suspend all operations in October 2014.

== History ==
Air armenia is an airline which headquartered in 21 Gevorg Kochar Street, Yerevan. The airline was established in 2003 and started operations on 18 March of that same year. The owners of Air Armenia were Versand Hakobyan and Gagik Tsarukyan. Since all passenger rights were granted in 2003 on an exclusive basis to Armavia for 10 years, Armenia could only operate as cargo airline.

After the liquidation of Armavia in 2013, Air Armenia announced plans to launch passenger services, and became the largest air carrier of Armenia. In July 2013, General Department of Civil Aviation of Armenia granted Air Armenia to operate its first passenger flights. On 29 October 2014, the airline suspended all operations until at least 20 December due to financial problems.

In December 2014 a Ukrainian investment fund announced the purchase of a 49% stake, pledging to help restart soon its operations under Air Armenia Cargo brand. Vladimir Bobylev, the chief executive of the East Prospect Fund, pledged to invest at least $30 million in the troubled air carrier. Armenian news agencies quoted him as saying that he had plans to replace and expand the company's small fleet of aircraft in the coming months.

== Destinations ==
Air Armenia served the following destinations:

City	Country	IATA	ICAO	Airport	Notes
Athens	Greece	ATH	LGAV	Athens International Airport	
Frankfurt	Germany	FRA	EDDF	Frankfurt Airport	
Krasnodar	Russia	KRR	URKK	Pashkovsky Airport	
Moscow	Russia	VKO	UUWW	Vnukovo International Airport	
Nizhny Novgorod	Russia	GOJ	UWGG	Nizhny Novgorod International Airport	
Paris	France	CDG	LFPG	Charles de Gaulle Airport	
Saint Petersburg	Russia	LED	ULLI	Pulkovo Airport	
Samara	Russia	KUF	UWWW	Kurumoch International Airport	
Sochi	Russia	AER	URSS	Sochi International Airport	
Yekaterinburg	Russia	SVX	USSS	Koltsovo Airport	
Tehran	Iran	IKA	OIIE	Tehran Imam Khomeini International Airport	
Yerevan	Armenia	EVN	UDYZ	Zvartnots International Airport	Hub
