= Zvartnots =

Zvartnots may refer to:

- Zvartnots Cathedral, a 7th-century Armenian church
- Zvartnots International Airport in Yerevan, Armenia
- Zvartnots, Armenia, a town
- Zvartnots-AAL F.C., a defunct Armenian football club based in Yerevan, Armenia
