= Gulf Air Flight 072 =

2000 aviation accident in the Persian Gulf

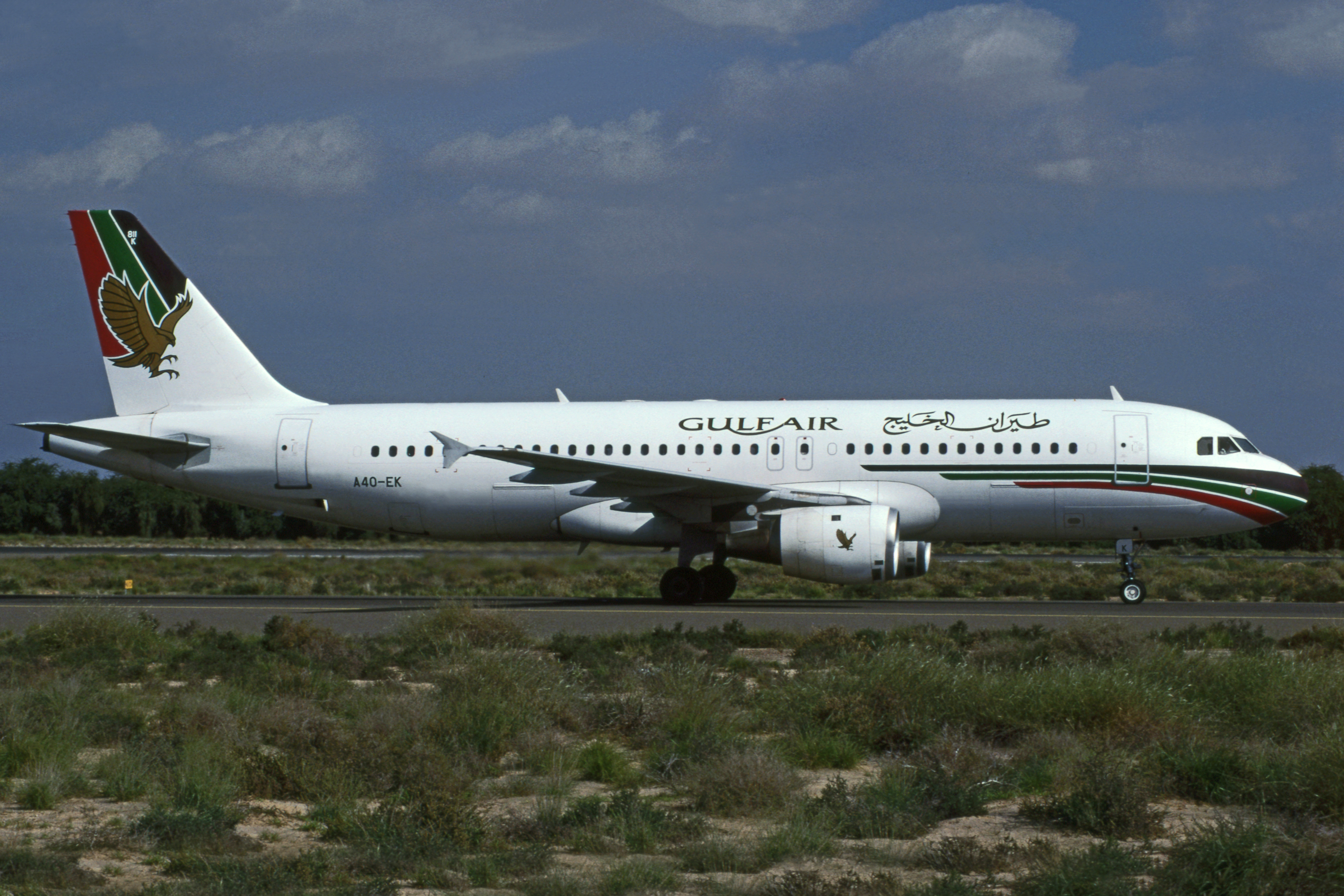
- A4O-EK, the aircraft involved in the accident, seen in 1999

Accident
- Date: 23 August 2000
- Summary: Controlled flight into water following loss of situational awareness and pilot error
- Site: Persian Gulf, 2 km (1.2 mi) north off Bahrain International Airport, Muharraq, Bahrain; 26°17′51″N 50°38′49″E

Aircraft
- Aircraft type: Airbus A320-212
- Operator: Gulf Air
- IATA flight No.: GF072
- ICAO flight No.: GFA072
- Call sign: GULF AIR 072
- Registration: A4O-EK
- Flight origin: Cairo International Airport, Cairo, Egypt
- Destination: Bahrain International Airport, Muharraq, Bahrain
- Occupants: 143
- Passengers: 135
- Crew: 8
- Fatalities: 143
- Survivors: 0

Gulf Air Flight 072 was a scheduled international passenger flight from Cairo International Airport, Egypt, to Bahrain International Airport, Bahrain, operated by Gulf Air. On 23 August 2000 at 19:30 Arabia Standard Time (UTC+3), the Airbus A320 crashed minutes after executing a go-around following a failed attempt to land on Runway 12. The flight crew suffered from spatial disorientation during the go-around and crashed into the shallow waters of the Persian Gulf 2 km (1 nmi) from the airport. All 143 people on board the aircraft were killed in what remains the deadliest aviation accident in Bahraini and Gulf Air history, and was the deadliest accident involving an Airbus A320 at the time, which was later surpassed by TAM Airlines Flight 3054.

The final report, issued on 15 August 2002, concluded that the individual factors contributing to the accident were non−adherence to a number of Standard Operating Procedures (SOP) and loss of spatial and situational awareness by the aircraft crew during the approach and final phases of the flight. A number of systemic factors also contributed to the accident, including deficiency in crew resource management (CRM) training by Gulf Air and safety oversights by the Directorate General Of Civil Aviation and Meteorology of Oman.

== Aircraft ==
Flight 072 was operated with an Airbus A320-212, registered as A4O-EK. It was delivered to Gulf Air in September 1994. It was powered by two CFM International CFM56-5A3 engines and had accumulated 17,370 hours in 13,990 takeoff and landing cycles before the accident. Its last maintenance was conducted on 17–18 August 2000. The aircraft was in compliance with all applicable airworthiness directives for the airframe and engines.

== Passengers and crew ==
People on board by citizenship
Nationality	Passengers	Crew	Total
Australia	1	0	1
Bahrain	34	2	36
Canada	1	0	1
China	3	0	3
Egypt	63	1	64
India	0	1	1
Kuwait	1	0	1
Morocco	0	1	1
Oman	1	1 (Note: The first officer.)	2
Palestine	9	0	9
Philippines	0	1	1
Poland	0	1	1
Saudi Arabia	12	0	12
South Korea	1	0	1
Sudan	1	0	1
United Arab Emirates	6	0	6
United Kingdom	2	0	2
United States	1	0	1
Total (17 nationalities)	135	8	143

The aircraft was carrying 135 passengers, 2 pilots, and 6 cabin crew members. Among the 135 passengers were 61 men, 37 women and 37 children (including 8 infants). The majority of the passengers were from Bahrain and Egypt. Most of the Egyptian passengers were expatriate families who were returning to their homes in the Gulf region after a holiday in Egypt. One Egyptian who was supposed to board the flight was turned away by immigration officials in Cairo who found his passport was not stamped with the necessary Egyptian interior ministry permit for working abroad.

The American Consulate in Bahrain confirmed that one American embassy courier, who reportedly was holding classified information, was on board Flight 072. Kuwait News Agency (KUNA) reported that three Chinese workers from a news agency in Cairo were also onboard. They were on a stopover in Bahrain, and would have continued to China.

There were two pilots in the aircrew:

- The pilot-in-command was 37-year-old Bahraini Captain Ihsan Shakeeb (إحسان شكيب). He joined Gulf Air as a cadet pilot in 1979 and, after training, served as flight engineer of the Lockheed L-1011 between 1988 and 1994, before being eventually promoted to first officer of the Lockheed L-1011 and soon after the Boeing 767 in 1994. He then served as first officer of the Airbus A320 in 1998, before once again serving as a Boeing 767 first officer the following year, until his official promotion to Airbus A320 captain in Jan, 2000. Shakeeb had 4,416 hours of flying experience (including 1,083 hours on the Airbus A320), of which 86 were as captain. (Note: The remaining 997 of his flight hours on the A320 were as first officer.)
- The First Officer was 25-year-old Omani Khalaf al-Alawi (خلف العلوي). He joined Gulf Air as a cadet pilot in 1999 through the company's ab initio training program. Having failed his initial Airbus A320 proficiency check on October 29, 1999, underwent additional training before being promoted to first officer of the Airbus A320 in April, 2000. Al-Alawi had logged 608 hours of flying experience, 408 of them on the Airbus A320.

== Accident ==
Flight 072 was a short-haul international passenger service operating from Cairo International Airport, Egypt, to Bahrain International Airport in Manama. The flight, normally about two hours in duration, was scheduled to depart at 16:00 local time. The crew arrived 25 minutes before departure but had been directed to an incorrect gate by ground personnel, resulting in a delay of more than 50 minutes. The aircraft eventually departed Cairo at 16:52 with 135 passengers and 8 crew members on board. Captain Shakeeb served as pilot flying, with First Officer al-Alawi as pilot monitoring.

=== Approach ===
Following an uneventful cruise, Flight 072 was transferred to Bahrain Approach for sequencing. As the aircraft neared Manama, the controller queried whether the crew had been cleared to 3,500 ft. Captain Shakeeb instructed the first officer to report that they had been cleared to 7,000 ft, which he believed was correct. ATC clarified that their assigned altitude was 3,500 ft, after which the aircraft commenced a rapid descent, resulting in a significant increase in airspeed. Mid-descent, the controller further cleared the aircraft to 1,500 ft, and the descent continued with rising airspeed.

On arrival in the terminal area, the aircraft was aligned with Runway 12. Due to the steep descent, the airspeed reached 313 knots (580 km/h; 360 mph), which was too high for proper configuration. Despite this, Captain Shakeeb chose to continue the approach and directed the first officer to report VOR establishment. He called for landing gear extension and flaps 1. At the final approach fix, the aircraft remained both high and fast.

Seconds later, Captain Shakeeb elected to switch from the previously agreed instrument flight rules (IFR) approach to a visual flight rules (VFR) approach. The aircraft remained above 500 ft—too high for a stabilized VFR landing—and the excessive speed prevented proper flap configuration. The autopilot and flight directors were disengaged.

Recognizing that the approach could not be stabilized, Captain Shakeeb requested flaps 2. Instead of initiating a missed approach, he decided to attempt a 360-degree orbit to lose altitude and speed before re-aligning with the runway. ATC approved the request. At an altitude of approximately 586 ft and 0.9 nautical miles from the runway, the aircraft began a left turn over the sea.

During the turn, the flaps were extended fully and the landing gear remained down, increasing drag. The aircraft’s bank angle and altitude fluctuated, and the turn was not flown in a stable manner, subjecting passengers to forces of +0.5 to +1.5 g. After several minutes, the aircraft rolled wings level.

Upon completion of the turn, the crew attempted to locate the runway. The first officer identified it at the 10 o’clock position, indicating that the aircraft had completed only a 270-degree turn rather than a full orbit. Captain Shakeeb did not immediately respond; after about 10 seconds he acknowledged, “We overshot it,” and initiated a missed approach.

=== Go-around and crash ===
Captain Shakeeb instructed the first officer to inform ATC of the missed approach. As the aircraft entered a climbing left turn, the flaps were retracted to position 3. ATC then provided radar vectors, which the crew accepted. With thrust set to TO/GA, the aircraft began climbing rapidly. The captain then lowered the nose slightly to moderate the climb, but this caused the airspeed to increase further.

ATC instructed the crew to turn to heading 300°, requiring a further left turn over the sea. During the turn, a master caution activated, warning of excessive airspeed for the current flap setting. Simultaneously, ATC requested that the crew contact the approach controller. The first officer alerted the captain to the overspeed condition.

With TO/GA thrust and insufficient nose-up attitude for climb, the aircraft continued to accelerate. Captain Shakeeb then applied a large nose-down input, inducing a rapid descent at a pitch angle of approximately 15°, the maximum permissible. As the first officer called “flaps three,” the Ground Proximity Warning System (GPWS) issued a “sink rate” alert. Instead of responding to the warning, the captain ordered flap retraction. As the aircraft descended toward the sea, the GPWS escalated to “Whoop, whoop! Pull up!” The crew continued discussing flap position while the aircraft descended unchecked. The flaps were fully retracted moments before impact; although the nose was raised slightly, the aircraft continued its descent, and the GPWS warnings persisted until the crash.

At 19:30 p.m., flying with a speed of 280 knots and a nose-down pitch of 6.5 degrees, the aircraft slammed onto the sea below, instantly killing all 143 passengers and crew members. Flight 072 ceased all contacts and was declared as missing.

== Response ==
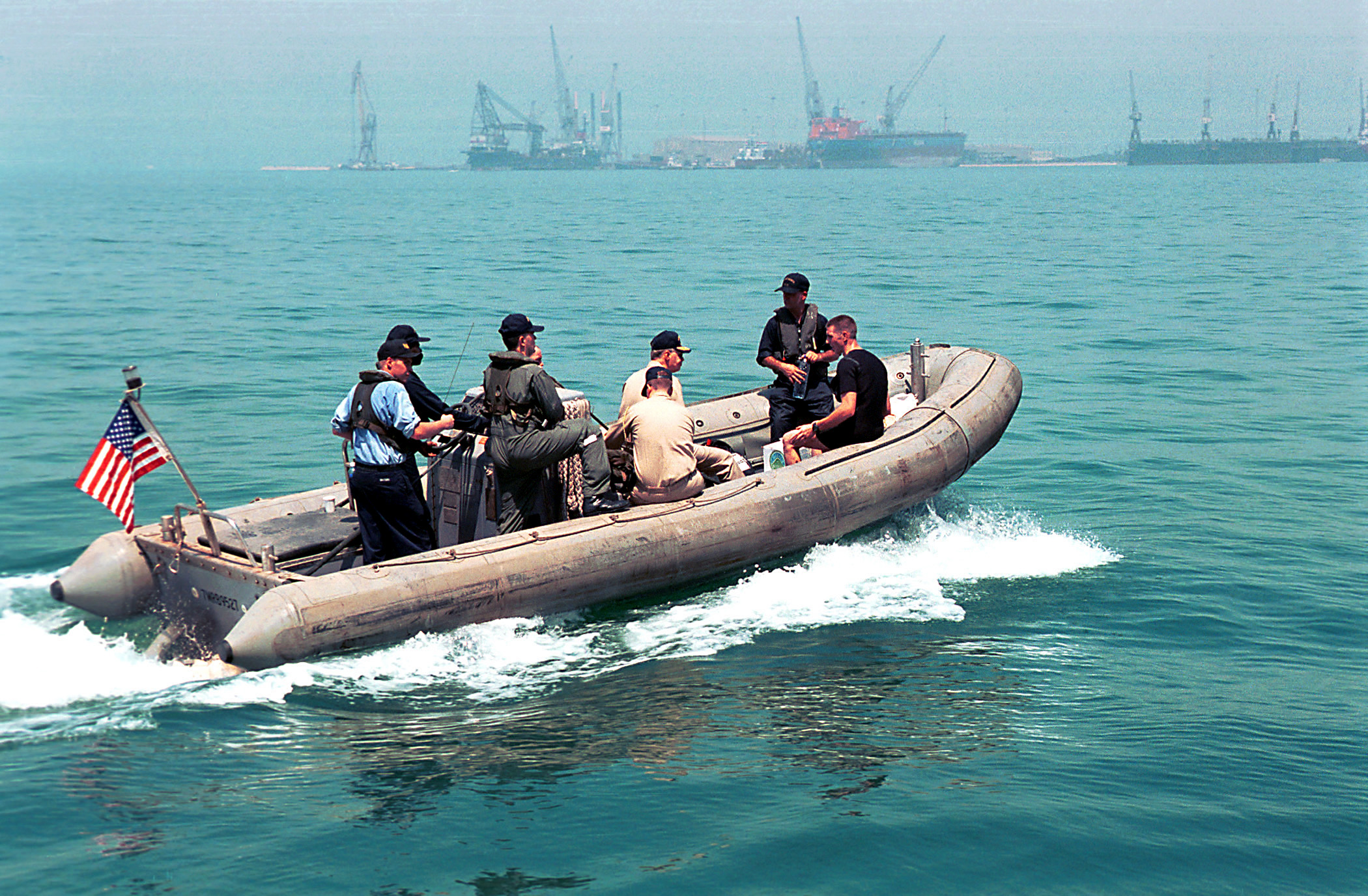
United States Navy sailors from the USS George Washington assisting with the salvage operations of Gulf Air Flight 072

The Bahraini government immediately dispatched members of the Bahraini Coast Guard and Civil Defense Agency. As the United States Navy Fifth Fleet was stationed in Manama's U.S. Commander of Naval Forces Central Command, the Bahraini government immediately requested assistance from the United States for the search and rescue operation. The US Navy deployed hundreds of its personnel to scour the crash site. US Navy support ship USNS Catawba was deployed with dive team, meanwhile the USS George Washington, which was docked in Manama at the time, sent 100 of its personnel to join the operation. Canadian forces stationed in the Gulf were also initially asked to assist in the operation, but were later called off.

Within hours of the crash, pieces of wreckage could be seen in the crash site, located in shallow waters approximately five kilometres off Manama Airport. The wreckage lay 6–9 feet (1.8–2.7 m) below sea level. Rescuers managed to recover more than 50 bodies from the crash site. Dozens of ambulances were dispatched and the bodies of the victims were transported to Salmaniya Hospital, the nation's largest medical centre. Manama Airport was eventually cordoned off and authorities barred people from entering.

Crisis centres were set up in both Manama and Cairo. A special flight to Bahrain would later be arranged for the relatives, and accommodation would be provided at Manama's The Gulf Hotel. Officials stated that trauma counsellors from Bahrain and Egypt would be provided for the next of kin. A trauma centre for the families was set up at the hotel, and services would be held to attend to their needs.

The hotel was also used for identification of the victims. Names of the victims were read out loud for the families, who were later taken into an undisclosed room to identify the victims. As several relatives began to cry in hysterics after several names had been read out, ambulances were put on standby, and medics were handed tranquillizers for the bereaved.

A national mourning period was declared by the Emir of Bahrain, Hamad bin Isa al-Khalifa, for three days in Bahrain following the crash. In Egypt and Bahrain, special praying services for the victims were held immediately after the crash. A national funeral service was eventually held on 25 August at Manama's Al Fateh Grand Mosque, which was attended by high-ranking Bahraini officials, including then Bahraini Prime Minister Khalifa bin Salman Al Khalifa, and members of the emirate. The funeral also drew thousands of Bahrainis.

In Egypt, officials stated that the government would provide every need for the relatives, particularly regarding repatriation and compensation. Egyptian Interior Ministry announced that travel documents would be provided for families who could not travel to Manama to retrieve their next of kin. High ranking officials also visited relatives in Cairo Airport's crisis centre and offered their condolences. In Palestine, President Yasser Arafat expressed regret to the relatives of the victims and visited their homes to extend his sympathy. Condolences also came from Iran and Qatar.

As of 24 August, the bodies of all 143 passengers and crews had been successfully recovered from the crash site. Authorities also managed to find the aircraft's flight recorders; both were found intact. Meanwhile, the US Navy announced that their personnel had been able to retrieve the classified yellow package that had been carried by its national from the crash site.

Gulf Air stated that victims would be compensated with $25,000 USD, which would also include repatriation of the victims to their respective countries. The amount would probably increase as soon as the investigation into the crash had finished. Gulf Air eventually offered to compensate a total of $125,000 USD for each adult victim and $80,000 USD for each minor victim, which were deemed by some of the relatives as inappropriate. Approximately three years after the crash, an out-of-court settlement was reached.

== Investigation ==
The investigation initially would be spearheaded by Bahrain; however, government officials quickly asked for assistance from the U.S. National Transportation Safety Board (NTSB) for the investigation of the crash. NTSB would later be declared as the agency in charge of the investigation. They would be joined by representatives from France, Egypt, and Oman. A total of 20 investigators would be involved in the probe.

Bahraini state TV initially claimed that the aircraft's engines were on fire before the aircraft plunged into the sea. A Bahraini ATC worker confirmed that no distress call had been made by the crew prior to the crash. The claim was corroborated by the recording, which showed that the crew didn't make any mayday calls to the ATC. The Bahraini Ministry of Transportation later stated that reports of engine fires were "pure speculation."

Several eyewitnesses claimed that the aircraft was seen circling over the sky of Manama twice before it fell. At some point the aircraft could be seen trying to swerve from the buildings in the capital. An official from the Ministry of Transportation eventually confirmed that the aircraft had tried to circle the airport twice, and somehow it veered onto the sea. Gulf Air's Chief Pilot Hameed Ali clarified that the crew had only commenced the approach once and was quick to refute claims that the crash had been caused by pilot error. He admitted that investigators would look into the conduct of the approach of Flight 072 following the reports. Ali further stated that there was "not an error spotted" in Captain Shakeeb's flying.

The flight recorders were found within days after the crash and were taken to Washington, D.C. on August 27 for readout. Preliminary analysis on the recorders revealed that there were indications that the crews had been facing difficulty in controlling the aircraft. Head of NTSB investigators in Bahrain, Frank Hilldrup, stated that the aircraft had been flown at an excess speed and the pilot at the helm had been warned by the co-pilot, but the warning was not heeded. The aircraft was put into a steep descent and didn't slow down until it crashed into the sea. Bahrain's Undersecretary for Civil Aviation, Ibrahim al-Hamer, stated that it was "premature" to express their opinion on the crash, though he added that it was the responsibility of the pilot to land their aircraft safely.

=== Conduct of approach ===
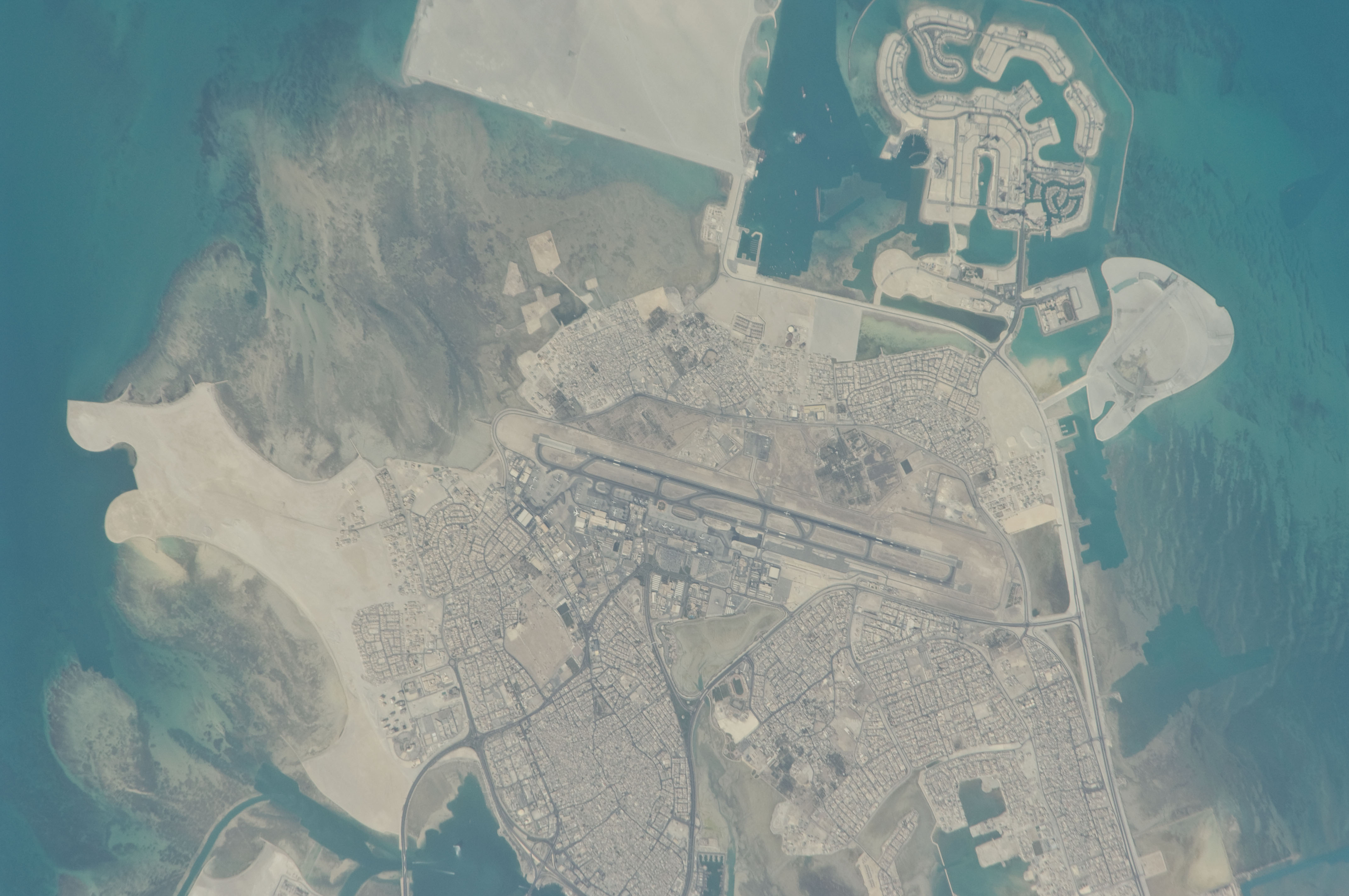
Satellite view of Manama Airport in Muharraq. The Gulf Sea is in the north of the airport. Flight 072 was approaching from the west. At the time, the artificial lands located north of the airport had not existed yet.

Accounts from eyewitnesses suggested that the aircraft had circled the airport multiple times whilst it was trying to land and at one point was seen trying to swerve around the buildings in Manama. Their statements were corroborated by radar data that showed the aircraft had been circling multiple times. The flight recordings confirmed that the crew had tried to circle the airport after having difficulties stabilizing their approach. Further investigation into the crew's conduct of the approach showed that multiple violations of flight rules had been done consecutively during the approach, which eventually led to the crash.

Flight 072 initially arrived in Manama at an altitude too high for a stable approach, and as such, the aircraft had to be flown with a high rate of descent, causing the airspeed to quickly rise. By the time the crew had finished their descent, the airspeed had reached 313 knots, too fast for a landing. Prior to landing, the flaps had to be extended, and such an airspeed would have damaged the flaps. The aircraft was also still too high, as it was flying at 1,800 feet. All of these were not in line with the approach procedure for Manama, which stated that by the time the crew had arrived at the final approach point, they needed to be at a speed of 136 knots, an altitude of 1,500 feet, and flaps and landing gear fully extended. Since there was no more time and distance left for the crew to stabilize their approach, the flight rules obliged them to conduct a missed approach.

Instead of executing a missed approach, the crew decided to press on. While nearing the airport, Captain Shakeeb suddenly told First Officer al-Alawi that they were going to switch from IFR to VFR, which was not relayed to the ATC. As the autopilot and flight directors were turned off, Captain Shakeeb noticed that the remaining time and distance for a safe and stabilized approach were insufficient. Despite his additional attempts to slow down by extending the flaps and landing gears, the aircraft was still too fast and too high. The correct procedure was to go around, but instead he elected to salvage his attempt by making a 360-degree orbit to land again.

First Officer al-Alawi then requested the ATC that they would like to do a 360-degree orbit, which was approved by the ATC since there was no traffic in the area. The procedure was not standard and violated most of the established rules for an orbit. Such a move could only be attempted prior to arriving at the final approach point. The altitude of Flight 072, at the time, was also dangerously low, merely 584 feet from sea level and less than a mile from the runway. Even though the instructions issued by oversights of the ATC workers had not given guidance for addressing such non-standard requests, the requests should not have been approved until the aircraft reached the minimum safe altitude.

During the orbit, Captain Shakeeb could not fly the aircraft smoothly as the extended flaps and landing gear inflicted significant drag. Having difficulty maintaining constant bank angle and altitude of the aircraft, Shakeeb made excessive input to the controls. The aircraft's nose began to alternately pitch up and down, fluctuating the altitude, and the bank angle began to increase and decrease, causing it to sway several times and inflicting significant G-forces on the passengers, startling them. At one point, the aircraft was banking at an angle of 36 degrees to the left and an altitude of merely 300 feet from the ground.

By the time they had finished their orbit, the aircraft was not lined up with the runway, as they had only turned for 270 degrees instead of 360 degrees. The aircraft was straying away from the airport, and this course was maintained for a full 10-seconds without any actions from Captain Shakeeb. Realizing that his plan had failed, Shakeeb finally decided to do a go-around. The flaps were fully extended and the landing gears were retracted, while the aircraft turned to the left towards the Gulf Sea. As the city went out of the cockpit's view, the crew faced pitch-black conditions without a single visual reference to rely on.

The thrust lever was set into TO/GA power, and the aircraft was put into a climb at a shallow angle of 5 degrees. The crew then hurriedly ran through the missed approach checklist. As the aircraft was turning away from Manama, the overspeed alarm suddenly blared, warning the crew that their excessive airspeed could tear the flaps. First Officer al-Alawi notified Captain Shakeeb by saying, "Speed, over speed limit!". The FDR at this point recorded that Captain Shakeeb made a large nose-down input, causing the aircraft to pitch down at the maximum allowable angle of 15 degrees. Flight 072's rate of descent immediately shot up at an alarming rate, causing the "sink rate" alarm to blare. The crew, however, didn't attempt to raise its nose up and in fact kept the same input for approximately 11 seconds.

As the aircraft was descending rapidly, it quickly lost its altitude and dived towards the sea below. Captain Shakeeb was still dealing with the flap overspeed situation when the GPWS suddenly blared, "Whoop, whoop!" Pull up!" warning the crew of the impending collision with terrain. The standard operating procedure stated that whenever the pilots heard such an alarm, they should've immediately raised the aircraft's pitch as the alarm was listed as a memory list, meaning that the pilots would've been trained rigorously to the point they instinctively did the appropriate actions when they heard it. In Flight 072, neither pilot did the exact commended actions and instead kept the same input as they were fixated with the flaps overspeed condition. Without any corrective actions, the aircraft kept descending until it slammed onto the sea below. Study and simulator trial from the accident revealed that, had Captain Shakeeb pulled the nose up within two seconds of the first GPWS warning, the aircraft would not have crashed.

=== Psychological factors ===
External videos
- FDR recording
- Animation of the FDR recording on YouTube

Captain Shakeeb inexplicably made a large nose-down input while the aircraft was turning towards the Gulf Sea. At the time, the aircraft was accelerating rapidly and was flying away from the airport. The investigation hypothesized that Captain Shakeeb might have suffered a sensory illusion known as somatogravic illusion.

The accident happened at night, and as such, the pilots couldn't know the distance between their aircraft and the sea below them unless there were enough lights illuminating the area. As the aircraft headed towards the Gulf Sea in the north of the airport, where lights barely existed due to no buildings ahead, added with the fact that the stars and moon at the time were partially obscured by light haze and that there were barely any ships within their direction, the crew couldn't spot the horizon line that separated the sea and the sky. Absence of external visual references would have forced the pilots to rely on their vestibular somatosensory system, and difficulty in identifying the horizon would cause dangerous sensory illusions for the pilots.

After failing to line up with the runway for the second time, the crew decided to go around. The correct procedure would've been to raise the aircraft's nose to 15 degrees, but in Flight 072, the pilots raised the nose by only around 8–9 degrees. As the pilots were conducting the go-around, the thrust lever was put into TO/GA power, causing the aircraft to rapidly accelerate. The propelling forces from the increasing thrust power initially caused the nose to be raised to 13 degrees, but Captain Shakeeb decided to decrease it to around 5 degrees. This rapid acceleration, low climb angle, and lack of external visual reference caused the pilots to feel that the aircraft was pitching up significantly, while in reality it was climbing at a shallow angle.

Analysis from the FDR confirmed that the pilots might have been inflicted by forces significant enough to cause them to think that the aircraft was pitching up, which was largely contributed by the shallow climb angle and rapid acceleration. Calculations on the linear g-forces suggested that the pilots might have felt a false sensation of pitching up with an angle of approximately 12 degrees, even though it was actually flying at a 5-degree angle. The propelling forces from the near-maximum thrust and the initial pitching up of the aircraft caused the heads of the pilots to bend backward, causing the vestibular somatosensory system to shift and magnifying the sensation, which led the pilots to believe that the aircraft was significantly pitching up.

With not a single light that could be seen outside of the cockpit window, disabled flight directors, and no identifiable features of the horizon, the pilots relied on their vestibular somatosensory system and believed that the aircraft was pitching up with a large angle. However, the alarms had worked properly and warned the crew multiple times of the aircraft's high rate of descent. Despite the audible alarms in the cockpit warning the crew about the aircraft ever-quickly decreasing altitude, both pilots seemed to not be bothered by those.

Focusing on the situation that the pilots were facing, it was likely that the crew had faced a heavy workload and were overstressed that they had become fixated on a single problem. Captain Shakeeb, who was the pilot flying, had to abandon the approach after failing to line up twice, even after attempting a botched orbit. Documents from Gulf Air stated that company policy would have strongly suggested the pilots to try to land instead of conducting a missed approach, as it was frowned upon by the company. Doing a go-around would cause the filling of the Air Safety Report, in which the crew would be reprimanded by their superiors.

The CVR recording confirmed that the crew were stressed out by the situation, as Captain Shakeeb could be heard being frustrated after abandoning the approach. With the flight's late departure from Egypt and failure to land despite multiple attempts, it was very likely that he would have been summoned by his superiors as soon as he had gotten off the aircraft. As he attempted the go-around, he was still managing multiple things, including running through the landing checklist, reconfiguring the aircraft, and handling the question from First Officer al-Alawi regarding their contact with the ATC, before the flaps overspeed alarm suddenly appeared.

Due to his excessive workload and stress, Captain Shakeeb eventually became fixated with the flaps. When the aircraft started to feed him false information on the aircraft's pitching sensation, he immediately put the aircraft's nose down without much thinking. Despite multiple alarms, he continued to make the nose down input as he had been fixated with the flaps overspeed problem, which was displayed on the electronic centralised aircraft monitor (ECAM). Focusing his attention to the ECAM messages, he failed to notice that the aircraft was plunging towards the sea. Shakeeb instead maintained the nose down input until the end of the recording.

=== Poor CRM ===
Even though the crash was attributed largely to Captain Shakeeb's lapses in controlling and commanding the aircraft, investigators noted the impassive role that First Officer al-Alawi had been taking throughout the flight, whose task would also need to monitor the captain's actions as well. Instead of calling out the captain's mistakes and trying to correct them, al-Alawi stayed silent and didn't challenge Shakeeb's conduct. Even prior to the crash, al-Alawi had not made any input to the flight and instead followed Shakeeb's orders blindly.

Reports from fellow co-workers indicated that both pilots had strikingly different personalities that significantly contributed to the crash. Interviews gathered from pilots showed that Captain Shakeeb was perceived by many pilots as confident, sometimes bordering on overconfidence. At one point, a first officer who had flown with him had challenged Shakeeb on his decision to leave the engine anti-ice on even though they were cleared of flying from icing conditions. Shakeeb refused to accept his explanations. When the first officer showed his reference from the aircraft's manual, Captain Shakeeb still didn't agree and was firm with his decision. Meanwhile, First Officer al-Alawi was seen as shy, timid, and reserved, though he was inquisitive. Some of the interviewed pilots felt that al-Alawi might have been too reserved to speak up. One example was when one of his examiners intentionally deviated from the standard procedure during taxiing, in which al-Alawi failed to point it out.

The investigation further detailed that both pilots had problems with their abilities and flying experience. The training log revealed that Captain Shakeeb had barely passed his commander exam for two emergency procedures, which were rated as "D," the lowest allowable rating for training. With two "D" ratings, he was short from being re-trained by Gulf Air, as he needed to have three "D" ratings to be considered "F.". Despite Captain Shakeeb's 4,416 flight hours, he had only accrued a total of 86 flying hours as a captain of the Airbus A320. In the case of First Officer al-Alawi, he had just been hired a year before the crash. Training log for al-Alawi showed that he had failed his initial proficiency check, attaining "D" ratings on more than 5 categories. While under supervision during his line training, his aircraft struck debris on takeoff, effectively preventing the flight from pressurizing. He was eventually sent to re-training, with notes from the supervisor stating "poor airmanship and awareness."

With Captain Shakeeb's confidence and stubbornness and the First Officer al-Alawi's timidity, it was very likely that the cockpit environment would have a steep authority gradient, with Captain Shakeeb as the one who could make any input without much interference or interruptions from First Officer al-Alawi. Aggravated by both pilots lack of skill and increasing workload pressure throughout the flight, both pilots couldn't control the situation appropriately. Increasingly stressful conditions in the cockpit caused both pilots to fixate on the flaps overspeed problem, overlooking the high rate of descent that had been made by Captain Shakeeb.

Operational scrutiny of Gulf Air management also showed that there was no formal CRM training in Gulf Air. At the time of the crash, CRM training was basically nonexistent, even though Oman Civil Aviation Regulations, which Gulf Air was obliged to follow, stated that by June 1999 Gulf Air was required to establish a CRM training program. CRM training was eventually planned to be established by 2000; however, due to contract negotiations, the progress significantly stalled. A similar program had been attempted in the mid-90s, but it was eventually discontinued. The then-manager of said program had to resign as he had been frustrated from trying to get the program authorized by Gulf Air

=== Oversight failure ===
A review of Gulf Air management during three years of operation preceding the crash revealed repeated grave deficiencies, which led to serious sanctions from authorities. Among the deficiencies included in the review were problems with CRM, quality management, safety awareness, surface contamination, and crew records. Violations and non-compliances were also found in flight operations and unapproved changes to existing programs

In response to Gulf Air's failures to comply with the issued warnings, Omani authorities asked assistance from the International Civil Aviation Organization (ICAO) for further evaluation. The result showed that there were multiple non-compliances with the established regulatory requirements and opposition from Gulf Air to follow Civil Aviation Regulation (CAR) 121, which regulates certification and extra precautions for the safety of passengers on board. Gulf Air was actively opposing plans for civil aviation regulations' overhaul, which was condemned by Omani authorities. As a result, sanctions were given to the airline, including the suspension of some of its pilots. Despite this, Gulf Air didn't improve within the operational areas deemed inadequate and didn't follow the demands made by Oman.

Amongst the other findings that were noted by investigators were Gulf Air's actions of not keeping up with then-updated safety practices, which were usually conferred during the six-monthly International Air Transport Association (IATA) convention. Gulf Air initially attended the conventions regularly, but by mid-90s their attendance suddenly dropped. According to investigators, Gulf Air's decision to not attend the conventions would have greatly restricted the airline's awareness of new information and developments regarding the latest issues in aviation safety.

Gulf Air's training program was also regarded as a failure since pilots were found to be non-compliant with the standard operating procedure. This was evident with the pilots of Flight 072, who, despite having barely passed their training, were not adhering to the established procedure. Lack of responses to CFIT and GPWS alarms, which were regarded as basic and crucial, was regarded as among the gravest deficiencies.

Non-rigorous compliance with the existing safety regulations and poor safety oversights were eventually cited as one of the main contributing factors to the crash of Flight 072.

=== Conclusion ===
The accident investigation concluded that the primary cause of the crash was pilot error (including spatial disorientation), with a secondary factor being systemic organizational and oversight issues.

The investigation showed that no single factor was responsible for the accident to GF-072. The accident was the result of a fatal combination of many contributory factors, both at the individual and systemic levels.

1. The individual factors particularly during the approach and final phases of the flight were:
  1. The captain did not adhere to a number of Standard Operating Procedures (SOPs), such as:
    1. significantly higher than standard aircraft speeds during the descent and the first approach
    2. not stabilising the approach on the correct approach path; performing an orbit, a non-standard maneuver, close to the runway at low altitude
    3. not performing the correct go-around procedure
    4. other related items
  2. In spite of a number of deviations from the standard flight parameters and profile, the first officer (PNF) did not call them out, or draw the attention of the captain to them, as required by SOPs.
  3. A perceptual study indicated that during the go-around after the orbit, it appears that the flight crew experienced spatial disorientation, which could have caused the captain to perceive (falsely) that the aircraft was 'pitching up' (somatogravic illusion). He responded by making a 'nose-down' input, and as a result, the aircraft descended and flew into the shallow sea.
  4. Neither the captain nor the first officer perceived, or effectively responded to, the threat of increasing proximity to the ground, in spite of repeated hard GPWS warnings.
2. The systemic factors, identified at the time of the above accident, which could have led to the above individual factors, were:
  1. Organisational factors (Gulf Air):
    1. A lack of training in CRM contributing to the flight crew not performing as an effective team in operating the aircraft.
    2. Inadequacy in the airline's A320 training programmes, such as: adherence to SOPs, CFIT, and GPWS responses.
    3. The airline's flight data analysis system was not functioning satisfactorily, and the flight safety department had a number of deficiencies.
    4. Cases of non-compliance, and inadequate or slow responses in taking corrective actions to rectify them, on the part of the airline in some critical regulatory areas, were identified during three years preceding the accident.
  2. Safety oversight factors:

A review of about three years preceding the accident indicated that despite intensive efforts, the DGCAM as a regulatory authority could not make the operator comply with some critical regulatory requirements.

The chairperson of the accident investigation board adopted the report on 10 July 2002. The investigation showed that:

...during the go-around, as the captain was dealing with the flap over-speed situation, he applied a nose-down side-stick input, resulting in a nose-down pitch. While the aircraft was accelerating with TOGA power in total darkness, the somatogravic illusion could have caused the captain to perceive (falsely) that the aircraft was 'pitching up'. He would have responded by making a 'nose down' input. The aircraft descended and flew into the sea.

== Aftermath ==
Following the crash of Flight 072, numerous significant improvements were immediately implemented by Gulf Air. After investigators highlighted Gulf Air's non-existent CRM training, the airline announced that a CRM ground-school training program would be provided for the pilots and cabin crew members, effective immediately after the crash. The airline stated that they were committed to completing the CRM training for all pilots no later than June 2001. Further improvements, such as Line Oriented Flight Training (LOFT) and specialized CRM training for Airbus A320 types, would be added in 2002.

Gulf Air eventually suspended its ab initio training program after numerous issues began to arise. Further overhauls on its training program were conducted, such as increasing the frequency of GPWS training, a more rigorous pilot selection scheme, changes in instructor selection and training, and numerous improvements in safety initiatives. The training for the Airbus A320 go-around procedure in particular would be overhauled.

After the crash, Gulf Air established its first flight-data analysis system, which would enable them to monitor pilots' compliance with the company's standard operating procedure.

== See also ==
- Accidents and incidents involving the Airbus A320 family
- List of accidents and incidents involving airliners by airline
- List of accidents and incidents involving commercial aircraft
- List of aircraft accidents and incidents resulting in at least 50 fatalities
- List of accidents and incidents involving airliners by location § Bahrain

Specific incidents

- 1950 Air France multiple Douglas DC-4 accidents
- Afriqiyah Airways Flight 771
- Armavia Flight 967
- Flash Airlines Flight 604
- Kenya Airways Flight 507
