= Armenian International Airways =

Armenian airline

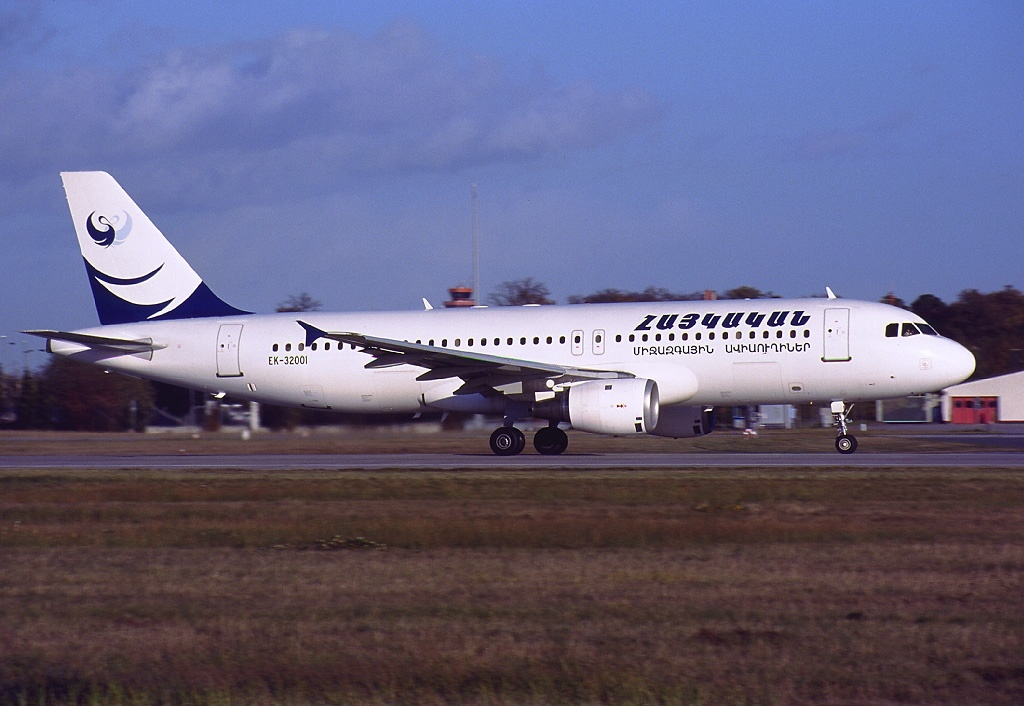
- Airbus A320
IATA	ICAO	Call sign
MV	RML	ARMENIA
- Founded: 2002
- Ceased operations: merged with Armavia in 2005
- Hubs: Zvartnots Int'l Airport
- Fleet size: 1
- Headquarters: Yerevan, Armenia
- Website: armenianairways.com/

Armenian International Airways (Armenian: Հայկական Միջազգային Ավիաուղիներ, Haykakan Mijazgayin Aviaughiner; AIA) was a privately owned Armenian airline that operated from 2003 to 2005. Headquartered in Yerevan, was based at Zvartnots International Airport. The airline primarily served destinations in Western Europe and was established with the goal of restoring Armenia's international air connections following the decline of Armenian Airlines.

== History ==
=== Founding and launch ===
Armenian International Airways was founded in 2002 by Armenian businessmen Gagik Tsarukyan, Versandik Hakobyan, Hrayr Hakobyan, and Levon Baghdasaryan. The airline received official registration on 13 June 2002. Technically assisted by Air Malta, AIA aimed to provide scheduled international flights to European destinations.

Operations began in late 2002, initially performing services from Yerevan to Paris (Charles de Gaulle Airport) and Frankfurt, Germany. These routes were previously operated by the declining Armenian Airlines. Plans were also announced to expand services to other European capitals such as Amsterdam.

=== Business model ===
AIA was structured as a privately funded commercial airline, backed by prominent Armenian oligarchs, notably Gagik Tsarukyan of the Multi Group conglomerate. Unlike its predecessor, Armenian Airlines, AIA operated under a model of private-sector efficiency. The airline offered scheduled passenger services with set ticket fares (e.g., approximately $560 for a Yerevan–Frankfurt round trip in 2002) and offered cargo shipments alongside passenger services. The company planned to gradually expand its fleet with modern Western-built aircraft respecting European noise and engine emission standards. However, AIA operated only a single aircraft throughout its existence.

=== Merger with Armavia ===
Armenian International Airways was merged into Armavia, a rival privately owned airline that had become Armenia's new national carrier following the collapse of Armenian Airlines in 2003. The effective date of the merger occurred on 1 January 2005. AIA's European operations and route licences were taken over by Armavia, and the AIA brand disappeared. Although the merger was complete by 2005, the airline's sole aircraft continued to operate under a lease contract until 2006.

== Operations ==
=== Destinations ===
At its peak, Armenian International Airways operated scheduled flights from Yerevan to:

- Paris, France (Charles de Gaulle Airport)
- Frankfurt, Germany (Frankfurt Airport)

Additional destinations, including Amsterdam, were planned but never launched.

Flight schedules indicated twice-weekly service to Paris and weekly service to Frankfurt.

=== Fleet ===
Throughout its existence, AIA operated a single aircraft:

Aircraft Information
Aircraft	Registration	Notes
Airbus A320-212	EK-32001	Leased from International Lease Finance Corporation (ILFC); configured for 156 passengers.

The Airbus A320-212 (manufacturer serial number 397) was delivered to AIA in September 2002. The aircraft remained in AIA livery and was occasionally sub-leased to other operators, including Air Arabia, after the 2005 merger with Armavia.

== Incidents ==
On 5 May 2006, AIA's sole aircraft, EK-32001, was destroyed in a hangar fire at Brussels Airport while under maintenance by Sabena Technics. The fire destroyed four aircraft in total, including an Airbus A320 operated by Armavia. No casualties were reported. The destruction of EK-32001 effectively ended any remaining operational presence of Armenian International Airways, which had no remaining aircraft at all.
