= Armenian Airlines (1991) =

Armenian airline

Armenian Airlines Հայկական Ավիաուղիներ
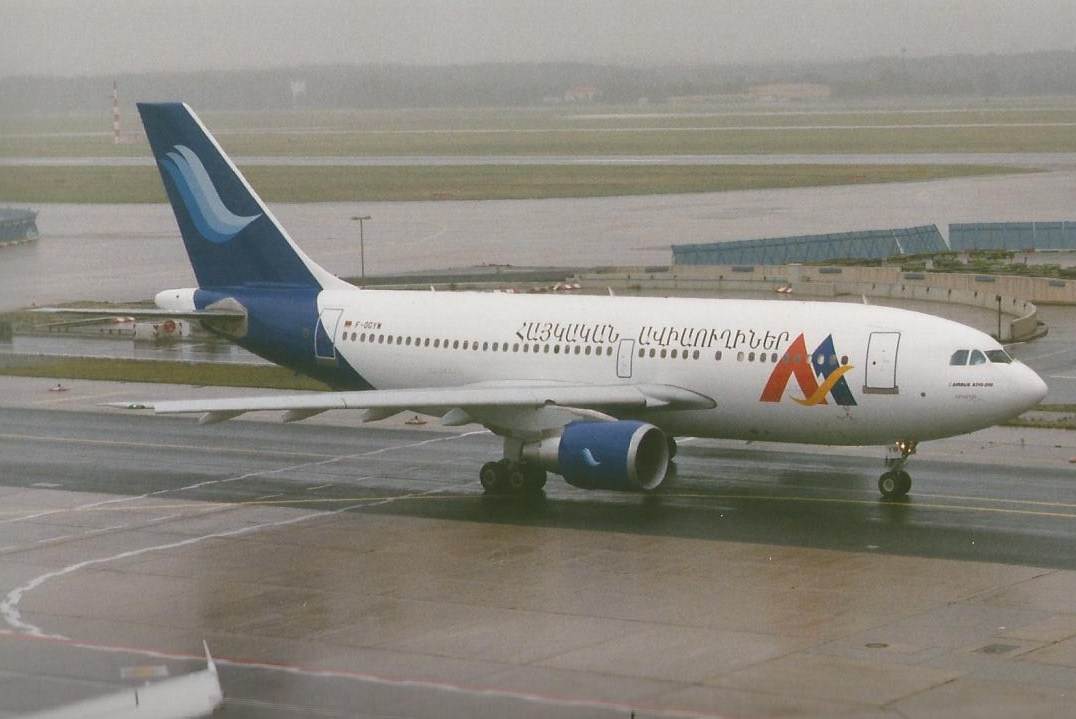
- Airbus A310
IATA	ICAO	Call sign
R3	RME	ARMENIAN
- Founded: 1991; 35 years ago
- Commenced operations: March 9, 1993
- Ceased operations: 2003 (reopened 2026November)
- Hubs: Zvartnots International Airport
- Alliance: VG Airlines (later renamed Delsey Airlines
- Fleet size: 25
- Headquarters: Yerevan, Armenia
- Key people: Arsen Avetisian (Director)

Armenian Airlines (Armenian: Հայկական Ավիաուղիներ) is the first Established Armenian airline company and the state-owned flag carrier of Armenia.

== History ==
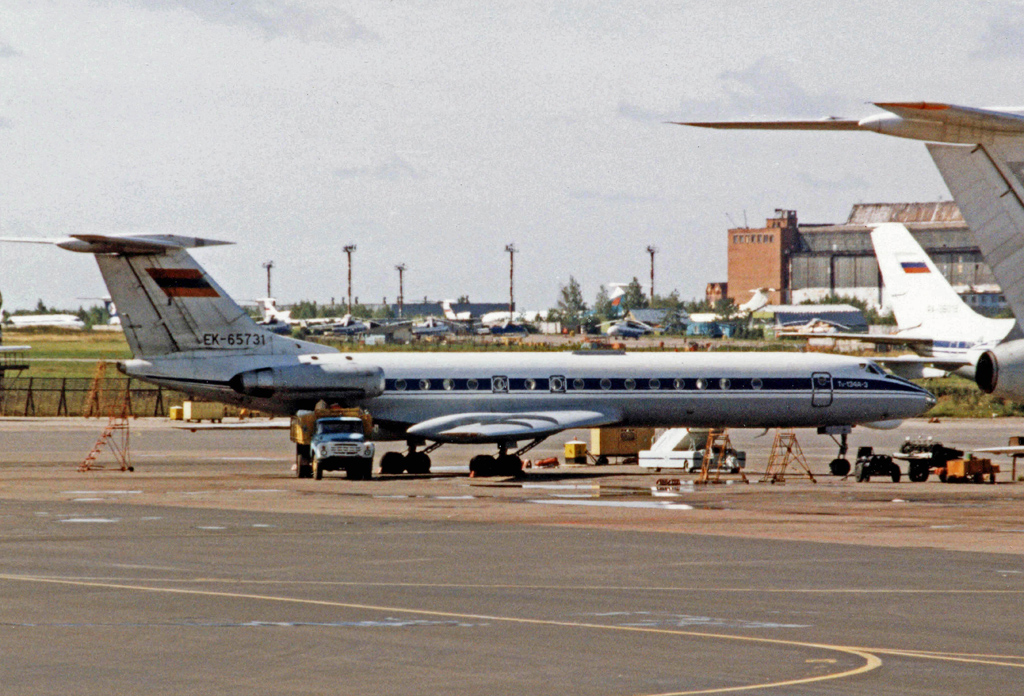
Armenian Airlines Tupolev Tu-134A still in basic Aeroflot colors at Moscow-Vnukovo airport in 1994

Armenian Airlines was established shortly after separation of local assets from Aeroflot's Armenia directorate in 1991. Scheduled operations were started on 9 March 1993. Privatization The privatization procedures were initiated by the government in July 1997, a project that was not completed due to various internal resistances. It was the sole carrier in Armenia until 2002, when private companies Armenian International Airways and Armavia began to compete.

Profitable until 1997, Armenian Airlines began a decline in 1998 which executive director Arsen Avetisian attributed to the 1998 Russian financial crisis. Additionally, technical problems with its sole Airbus A310 leaded the company towards financial problems. The airline filed for bankruptcy on November 5, 2002. Armenian Airlines was reported to be looking for cooperation with Armenian International Airways to continue or restart flights to Europe. When Armavia (which was owned by Siberia Airlines, later S7) entered into an agreement with the Armenian government and was granted most of Armenian Airlines' flight rights, including the lucrative Yerevan to Moscow route, Armenian Airlines CJSC was unable to recover, and officially declared bankruptcy on April 15, 2003.

On May 3, 2006, it was widely reported that an Armenian Airlines Airbus A320 had crashed in the Black Sea. The reports were evidently mistaken, since the airline had ceased operations in 2004. In fact, the airline involved in the crash was Armavia not Armenian Airlines, the successor of Armenian Airlines. All 113 passengers and crew on board died.

== Routes ==
After being established, Armenian Airlines operated old Antonov An-12, Tupolev Tu-134, Tupolev Tu-154, Ilyushin Il-86, Yakovlev Yak-42 airplanes of Soviet origin (Aeroflot). But following tightening of environmental regulations, these Ukrainian and Russian-built planes were banned from landing in European airports because they did not meet emissions and noise standards. At its peak, the airline operated 55 flights a week to the former Soviet Union, Western Europe and the United Arab Emirates. The A310 was the only aircraft in the Armenian Airlines fleet that met European aviation regulations. It flew every day on routes to Paris, Amsterdam or Frankfurt.

== Fleet ==
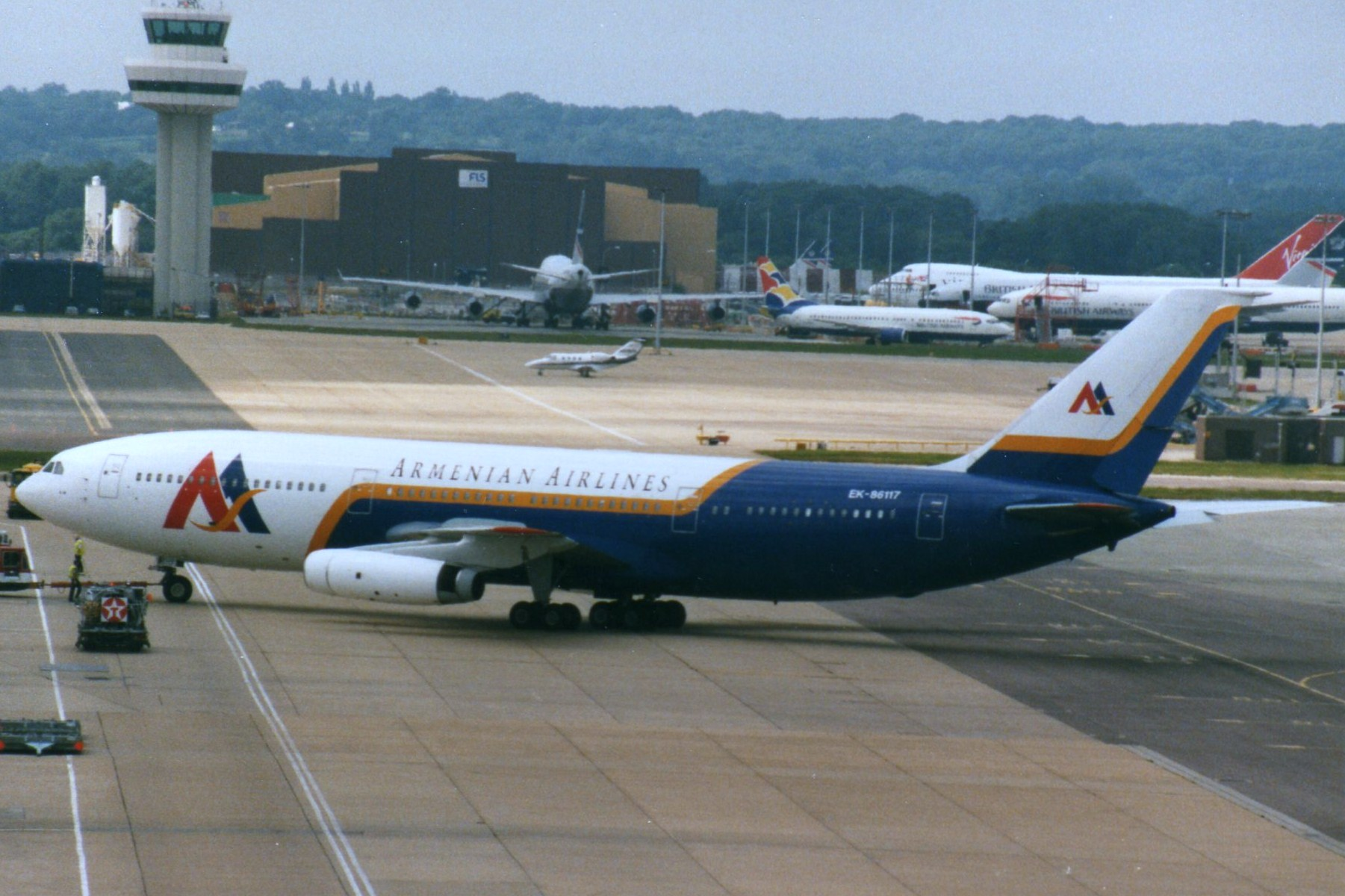
Ilyushin Il-86 at London-Gatwick airport before being retired

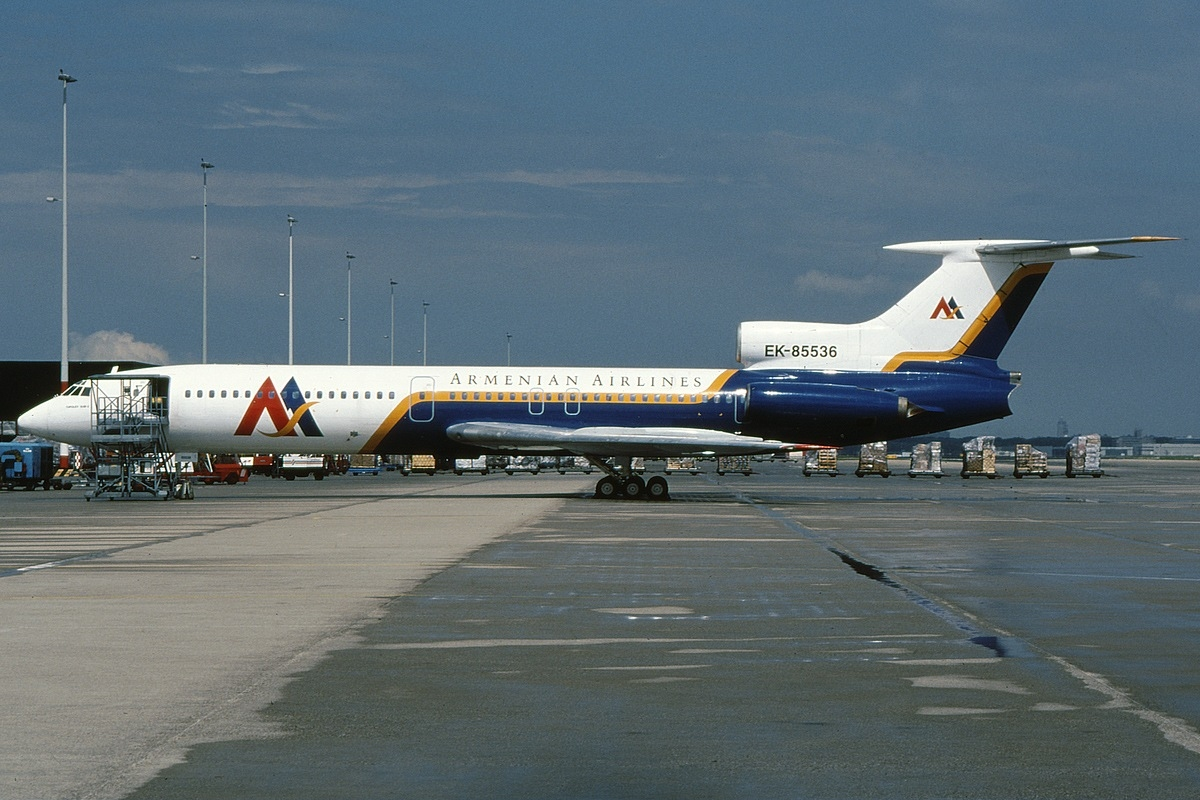
Tupolev TU-154

After being established, Armenian Airlines operated old Antonov An-12, Tupolev Tu-134, Tupolev Tu-154, Ilyushin Il-86, Yakovlev Yak-42 airplanes of Soviet origin (Aeroflot). But following tightening of environmental regulations, these Ukrainian and Russian-built planes were banned from landing in European airports because they did not meet emissions and noise standards. Because of this, Armenian Airlines began leasing an Airbus A310 in 1998, with an option to buy it. The contract stirred controversy among those who questioned why the government airline was, for the first time, using a non-Russian/Ukrainian-built aircraft. Some foreign agencies doing business in Armenia said they could not get life insurance for employees who flew on old planes due to the aircraft unsafe career. The Airbus, then, became the European approved instrument for the "official airline of Armenia". Armenian Airlines faced disruption on its European operations following an engine failure on its sole Airbus A310 on January 21, 2002, which caused a Yerevan-Paris flight to turn around mid-air and return to Zvartnots International Airport where the crippled Airbus landed safely. Previously, on September 14, 2001, and after taking off towards Paris CDG the twin jetliner had the same engine failure and was obliged to return to Zvartnots where all the emergency means had been activated. After four hours of waiting the flight to Paris was authorized to take place with tan Ilyushin 86. On January 28 of the same year, representatives of Armenian Airlines visited London to discuss means to get the A310 repaired. According to directors of the company, the repair bill could have gone as high as $2 million, the quickest solution being to replace the damaged engine. Otherwise, the engine would have to be sent either to Brussels, Belgium, or Toulouse, France, for repairs.

At the time Armenian Airlines ceased its operations, they only operated one Airbus A310 aircraft. Instead their previous aircraft included:

- Ilyushin Il-86
- Antonov An-12
- Tupolev Tu-134
- Yakovlev Yak-42
- Antonov An-24

Due to strict European Union regulations, all the aircraft of Soviet and Ukrainian origin were barred from flying to and from Europe.

== See also ==
- List of airlines of Armenia
- Transport in Armenia
