= Armenian Airlines =

Airline of Armenia

Armenian Airlines Հայկական ավիաուղիներ

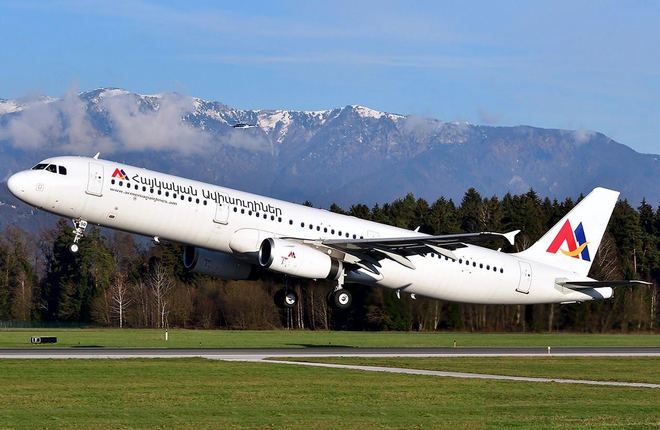
- Airbus A321
IATA	ICAO	Call sign
JI	AAG	APRICOT
- Founded: 2022
- AOC #: 076
- Hubs: Zvartnots International Airport
- Fleet size: 2
- Headquarters: Yerevan, Armenia
- Key people: Ararat Sargsyan
- Website: armenianairlines.am/en

Armenian Airlines LLC (Armenian: Հայկական ավիաուղիներ) is an inoperative Armenian airline company established in December 2022 and based at Zvartnots International Airport.

== History ==
Armenian Airlines was established in December 2022, and is unrelated to the former state-owned flag carrier of the same name.

On 7 April 2025, the airline suspended all flights due to the renewal of its fleet and the acquisition of new aircraft. In May 2025, the Armenian Civil Aviation Committee suspended the airline's air operator's certificate for a period of six months. The decision was due to the fact that the carrier had no airworthy aircraft in its fleet and no valid aircraft leasing contracts.

== Routes ==
As of April 2025, Armenian Airlines has suspended all flights. Previously, the airline served the following destinations:

Armenia

- Yerevan - Zvartnots International Airport Hub

Georgia

- Batumi - Alexander Kartveli Batumi International Airport Seasonal

India

- Delhi - Indira Gandhi International Airport

Russia

- Kazan - Ğabdulla Tuqay Kazan International Airport
- Mineralnye Vody - Mineralnye Vody Airport
- Moscow - Sheremetyevo International Airport
- Sochi - Adler-Sochi International Airport
- Ufa - Mustai Karim Ufa International Airport
- Volgograd - Gumrak Airport

== Fleet ==
Armenian Airlines previously operated a fleet of two Airbus A321s.

== See also ==
- Transport in Armenia
