= Zvartnots, Armenia =

Town in Armavir, Armenia

Zvartnots Զվարթնոց
- Location within Armenia
- Coordinates: 40°9′45″N 44°24′12″E
- Country: Armenia
- Province: Armavir

Zvartnots (Armenian: Զվարթնոց, romanized: Zvart'nots', lit. 'celestial angels', IPA: [zəvɑɾtʰˈnɔtsʰ] (Western Armenian)) is a town in the Armenian province of Armavir, about 10 km west from Yerevan, approximately halfway to Ejmiatsin.

Zvartnots International Airport, Yerevan's international airport, is located near the town of Zvartnots, as is the Zvartnots Cathedral. The former national airline, Armavia, had its corporate headquarters on the grounds of Zvartnots International Airport. In addition, the head office of the General Department of Civil Aviation of Armenia is at Zvartnots Airport.

== See also ==
- Armavir Province
