= Armavia =

Armenian airline

Armavia Airline Company Ltd «Արմավիա» ավիաընկերություն ՍՊԸ

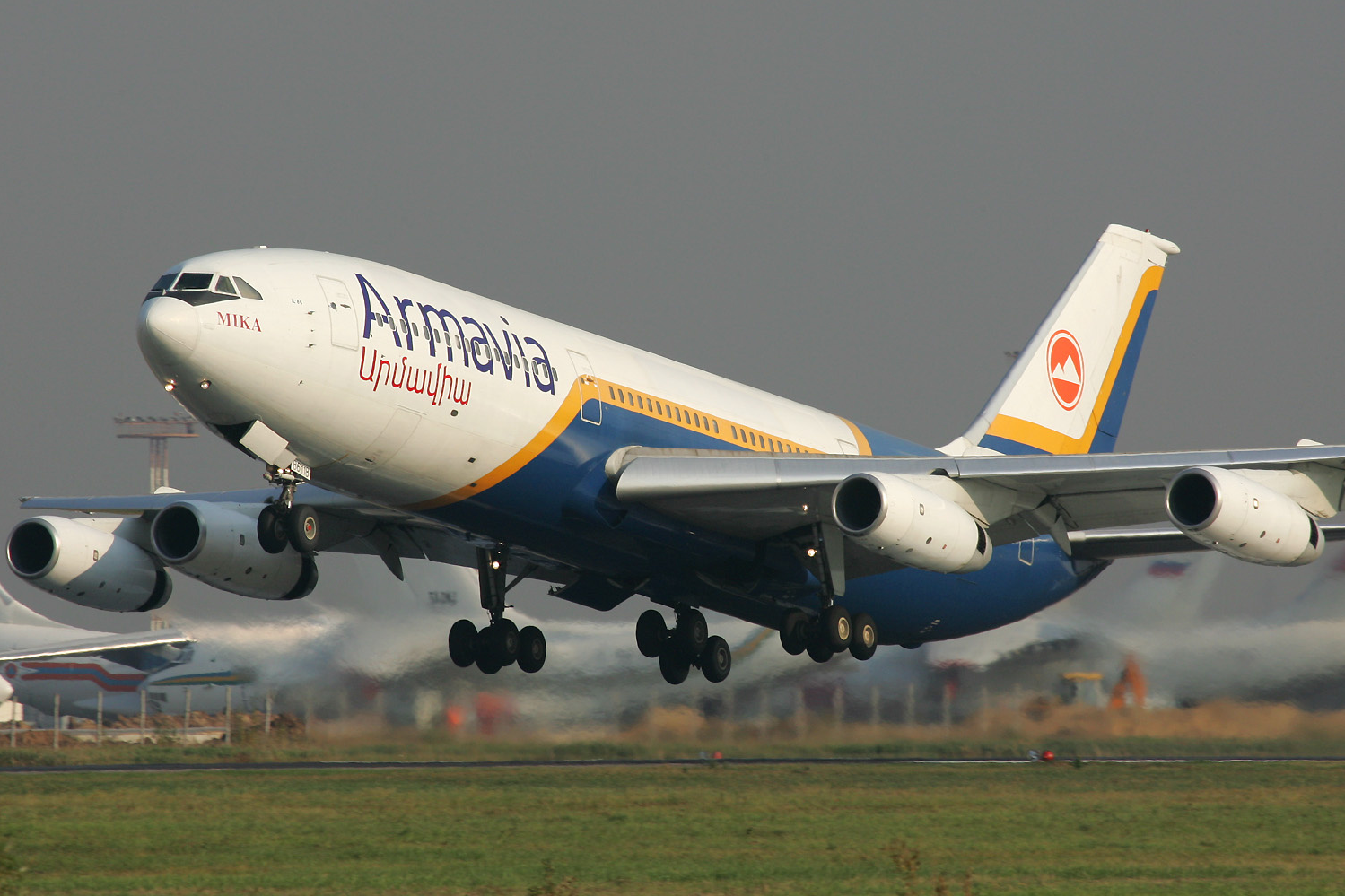
- Ilyushin 86
IATA	ICAO	Call sign
U8	RNV	ARMAVIA
- Founded: 1996
- Ceased operations: 1 April 2013
- Hubs: Zvartnots Airport
- Fleet size: 11
- Parent company: Mika Armenia Trading
- Headquarters: Zvartnots International Airport; Yerevan, Armenia
- Key people: Norayr Belluyan

Armavia (Armenian: Արմավիա) was Armenia's flag carrier that existed between 1996 and 2013. Headquarters were located close to Yerevan Zvartnots International Airport. It operated international passenger services from Zvartnots International Airport main base to destinations in Europe and Asia.

On March 29, 2013, Armavia announced the decision to file bankruptcy proceedings and suspend operations as of 1 April 2013. All flights were cancelled by the evening of the announcement.

== History ==
Armavia was established in 1996, but commercial flights to Russia and Turkey only started in 2001. In 2002, a strategic alliance was established with the Russian airline S7 Airlines (formerly Sibir Airlines) which purchased 50% of Armavia's shares from "Chernomoravia" company under the name of "Aviafin" company, registered in Armenia but belonging to the leadership of S7 Airlines as natural persons. Later, S7 bought an additional 18% of shares from Mika Armenia Trading company, owned by prominent Armenian businessman Mikhail Baghdasarov. An investment contract between S7 and Armavia was signed on 14 March 2003, at which point 68% of Armenian airline shares were owned by S7, and the remaining 32% by Mika Armenia Trading.

In 2003, Armavia took over a part of the bankrupt Armenian Airlines' operations. In 2005, Mikhail Baghdasarov's Mika Armenia Trading bought S7's 68% of shares and became Armavia's only shareholder with a 100% stake in the company. In 2005, the airline transported 513,800 passengers and had over 550 employees. The turnover for 2005 amounted to roughly $90 million. In 2007, the airline transported 572,300 passengers on scheduled and charter flights, a 21% increase compared to 2006.

In 2010, the airline transported over 800,000 passengers. On 21 April 2011, Armavia became the first airline to fly Sukhoi Superjet 100 from Yerevan to Moscow. On 29 March 2013, Armavia ceased flying and filed for bankruptcy after operating for two consecutive years in financial depression. The airline left many passengers stranded in various airports. Not all passengers received refunds after ceasing operations.

== Destinations ==
Armavia had always shown interest in serving Los Angeles (California) with non-stop flights from Yerevan, but had not revealed further details on the matter. They also lacked the proper long-range aircraft to operate the flight. As a matter of fact they operated non-stop flights to Amsterdam and Berlin.

=== Codeshare agreements ===
Armavia had codeshare agreements with the following airlines:

- Aerosvit
- airBaltic
- Air France (SkyTeam)
- El Al
- Rossiya Airlines
- Kuban Airlines
- LOT Polish Airlines (Star Alliance)
- Transaero
- Ural Airlines
- UTair
- VIM Airlines

== Fleet ==
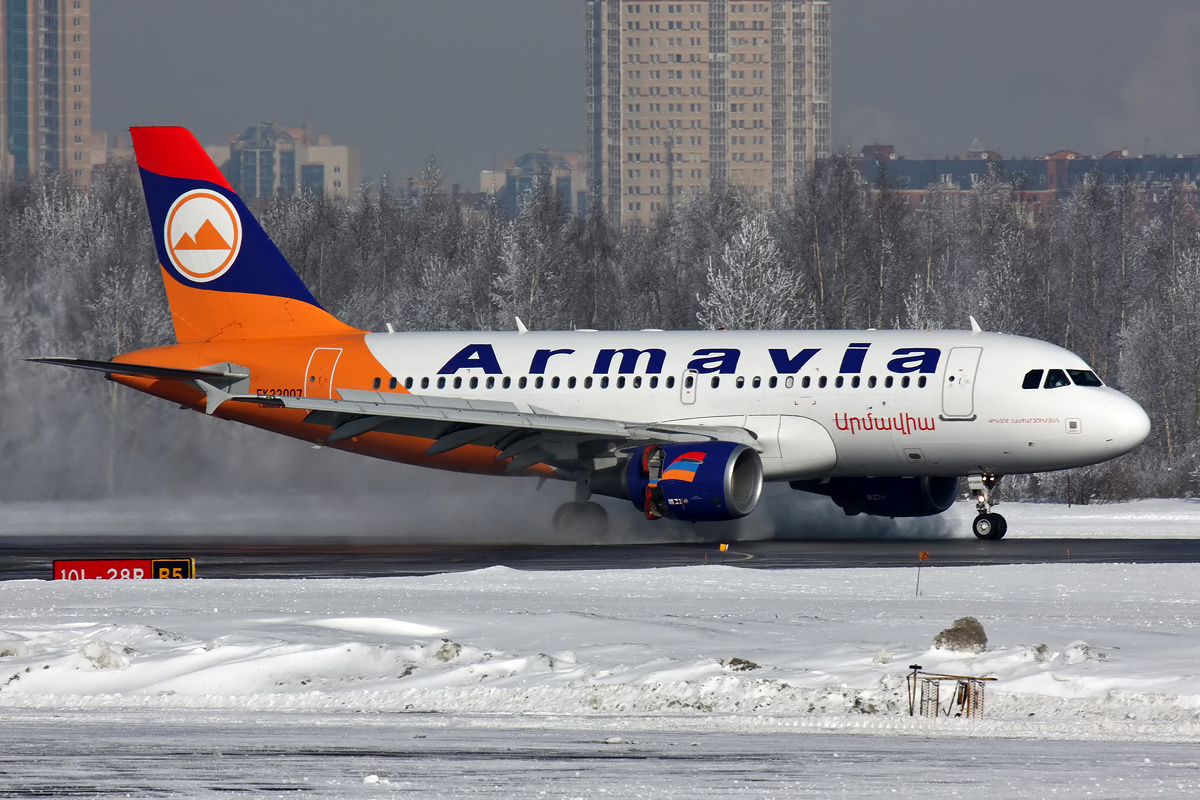
An Airbus A319-100 at St. Petersburg Pulkovo Airport in 2010

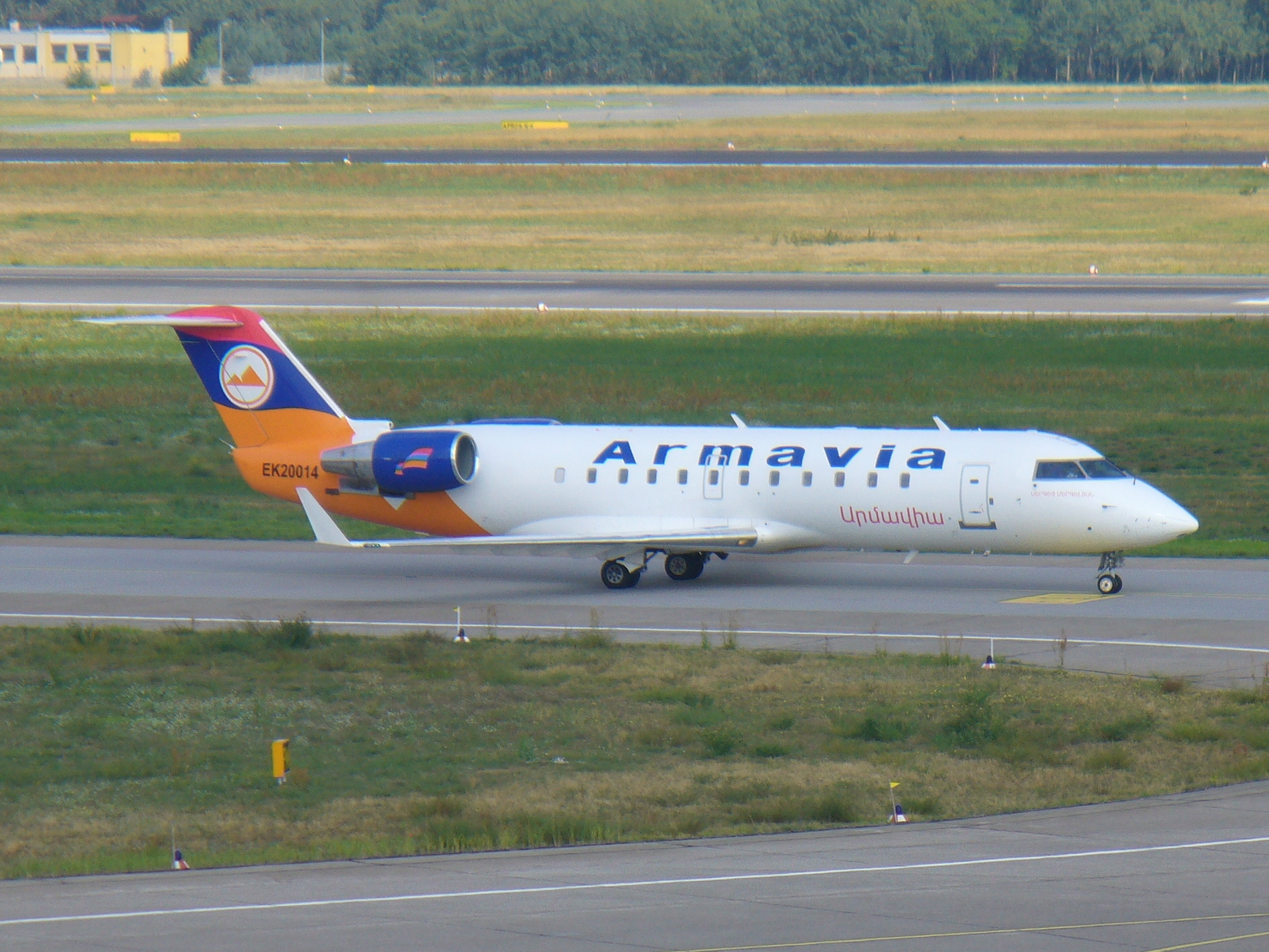
Bombardier CRJ200LR was the smallest jetliner in the fleet

In November 2012, the Armavia fleet consisted of the following aircraft:

Armavia fleet
Aircraft	Number	Passengers			Notes
Aircraft	Number	C	Y	Total	Notes
Airbus A319-100	1	VIP			Operating for Government of Armenia
Airbus A320-200	2	8	156	164	One crashed as Flight 967
Boeing 737-500	3	—	104	104	
Bombardier CRJ200LR	3	6	44	50	
Sukhoi Superjet 100	1	—	98	98	Launch customer
Yakovlev Yak-42D	1	VIP		27	Operating VIP flights
Total	11				

=== Fleet developments ===
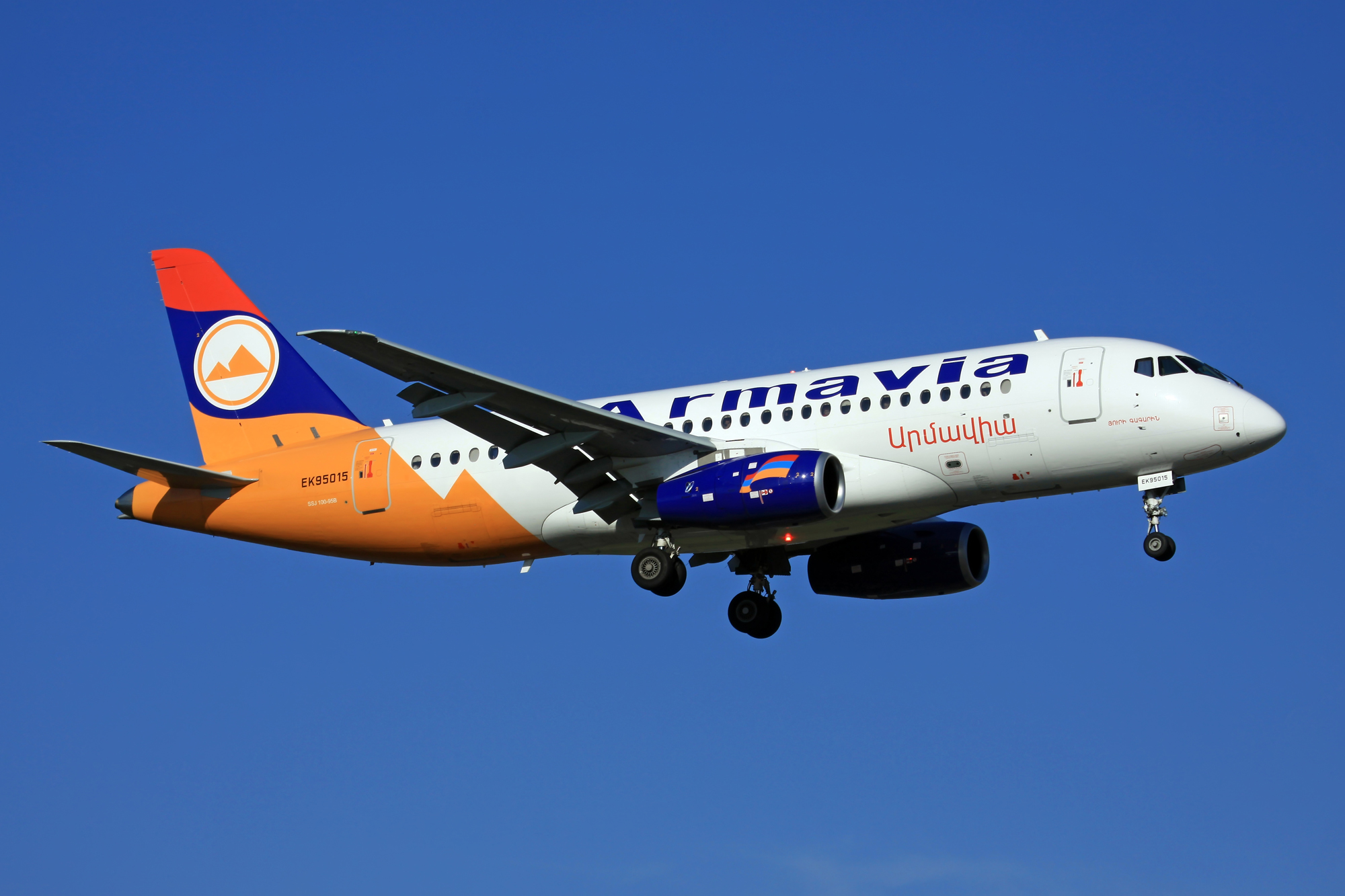
Armavia was the first airline to operate the Sukhoi Superjet 100

On 1 September 2007, Armavia signed a multimillion-dollar agreement with Russia's Sukhoi Civil Aircraft for two Sukhoi Superjet 100-95LR aircraft by the end of 2009. Under the agreement, Armavia had the option to acquire another two SuperJet 100-95LRs in the future. On 19 April 2011, Armavia took delivery of the first Sukhoi Superjet 100. In doing so, Armavia became the first company to put the aircraft in commercial revenue service. On 9 July 2012, it cancelled its order for a second Sukhoi Superjet 100.

On 7 August 2012, it was reported that Armavia had decided to return its remaining Sukhoi Superjet 100 to the manufacturer, citing reliability concerns. On 2 October 2012, the airline agreed to take back the first SSJ.

== Incidents and accidents ==
On 3 May 2006, an Armavia Airbus A320 (registration: EK-32009) operating as Armavia Flight 967 crashed into the Black Sea en route from Yerevan to Sochi, a seaside resort town in Russia. The fatal crash was a controlled flight into terrain accident, killing all 105 passengers and 8 crew on board. The aircraft was completely destroyed by impact with the water. The crash was caused by inadequate control inputs of the captain following a go-around after the first attempted approach. Contributing factors to the accident were the lack of necessary monitoring of the aircraft descent parameters by the first officer, and the improper reaction of the crew to the subsequent ground proximity warning system warning. Poor visibility and weather contributed to the crash as well.
