= Falling (accident) =

Cause of injury or death

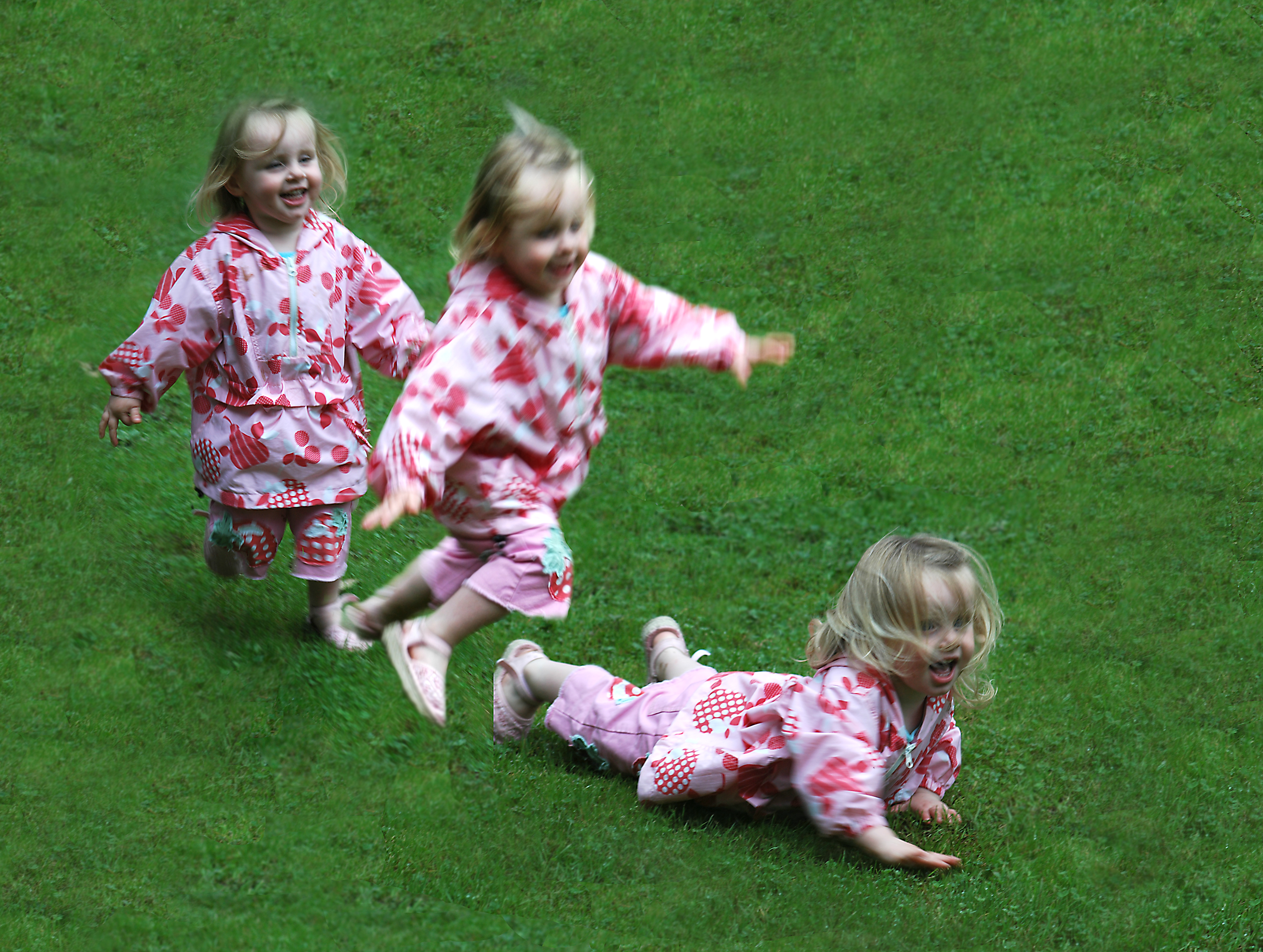
- Falling is a normal experience for young children, but falling from a significant height or onto a hard surface can be dangerous.
- Specialty: Emergency medicine
- Complications: Head injury, concussion, bone fracture, abrasion, bruise
- Risk factors: Convulsion, vision impairment, intoxication, difficulty walking, home hazards
- Frequency: 226 million (2015)
- Deaths: 527,000 (2015)

Falling is the phenomenon of a person or animal losing balance and limb support for the core, causing the head and torso to end up in a lower position, often on the ground. Mechanical fall is the medical term that describes falling from standing not caused by altered/loss of consciousness (syncope), and a trip is a mechanical fall due to unwanted interactions with other objects in the environment when walking, running or jumping, usually an unintended contact between the feet and things on the ground.

Falling is the second-leading cause of accidental death worldwide and a major cause of personal injury, especially for the elderly. Falls in older adults are a major class of preventable injuries. Construction workers, electricians, miners, and painters are occupations with high rates of fall injuries.

Long-term exercise appears to decrease the rate of falls in older people. About 226 million cases of significant accidental falls occurred in 2015. These resulted in 527,000 deaths.

== Causes ==
=== Accidents ===
The most common cause of falls in healthy adults is accidents. It may be by slipping or tripping from stable surfaces or stairs, improper footwear, dark surroundings, uneven ground, or lack of exercise. Studies suggest that women are more prone to falling than men in all age groups.

=== Age ===
Accidental deaths in the United States

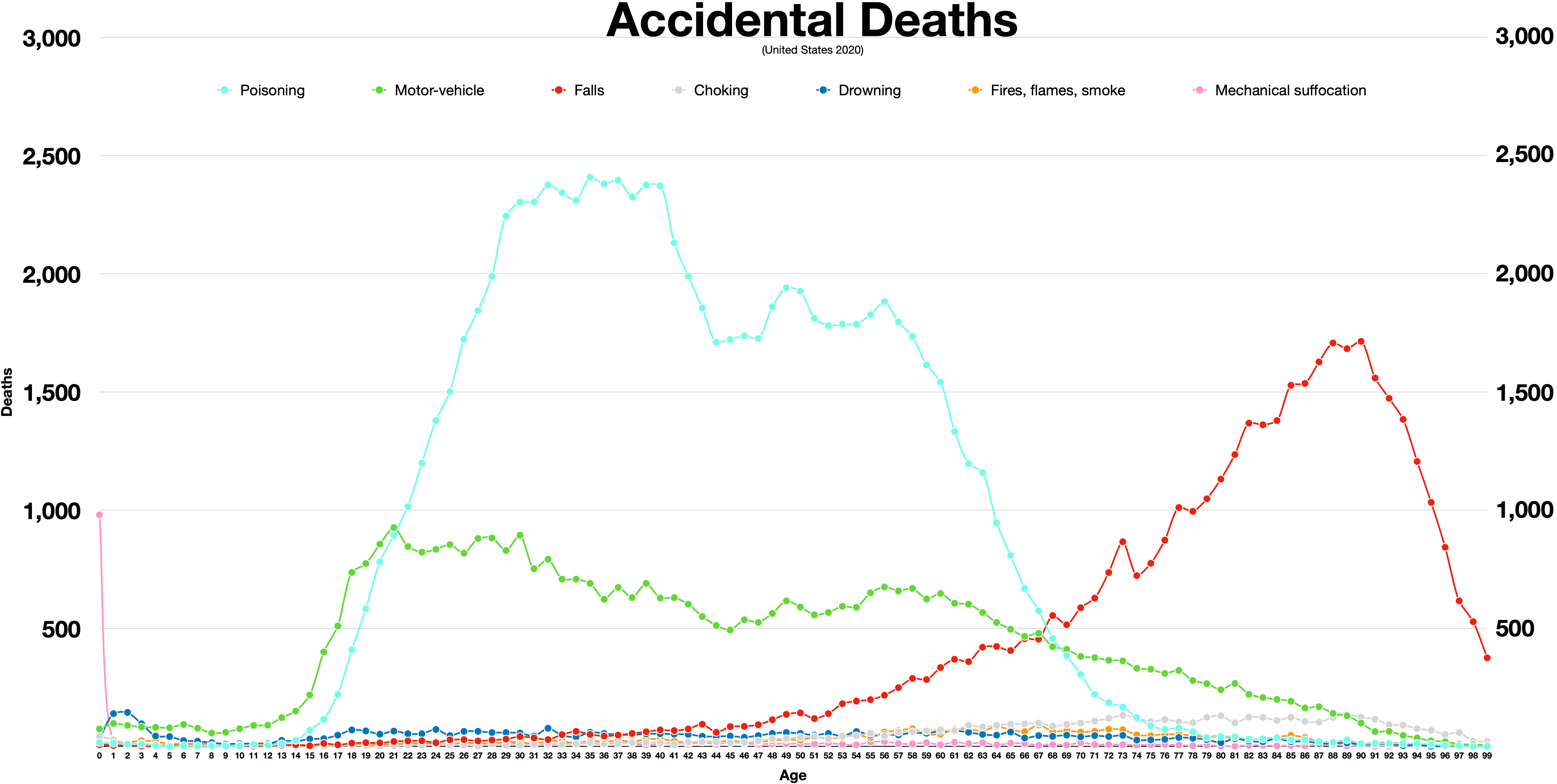
2020

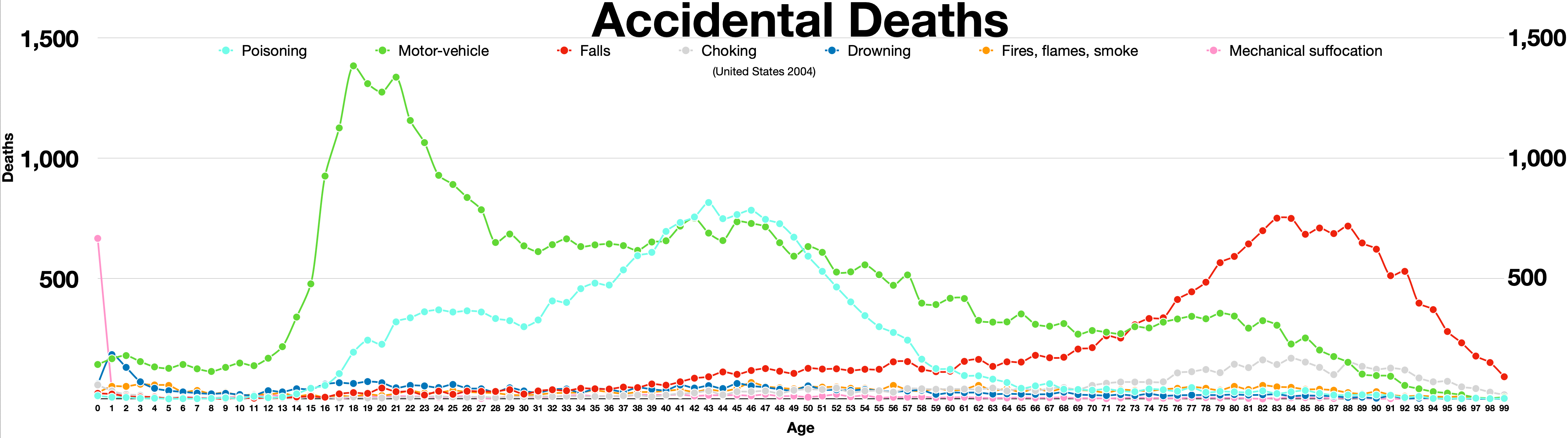
2004

Poisoning
Motor-vehicle
Falls
Choking
Drowning
Fires, flames, smoke
Suffocation

Older people and particularly older people with dementia are at greater risk than young people to injuries due to falling. Older people are at risk due to accidents, gait disturbances, balance disorders, changed reflexes due to visual, sensory, motor and cognitive impairment, medications and alcohol consumption, infections, and dehydration.

=== Illness ===
People who have experienced stroke are at risk for falls due to gait disturbances, reduced muscle tone and weakness, side effects of drugs, low blood sugar, low blood pressure, and loss of vision.

People with Parkinson's disease are at risk of falling due to gait disturbances, loss of motion control including freezing and jerking, autonomic system disorders such as orthostatic hypotension, fainting, and postural orthostatic tachycardia syndrome; neurological and sensory disturbances including muscle weakness of lower limbs, deep sensibility impairment, epileptic seizure, cognitive impairment, visual impairment, balance impairment, and side effects of drugs to treat PD.

People with multiple sclerosis are at risk of falling due to gait disturbances, drop foot, ataxia, reduced proprioception, improper or reduced use of assistive devices, reduced vision, cognitive changes, and medications to treat MS.

=== Workplace ===
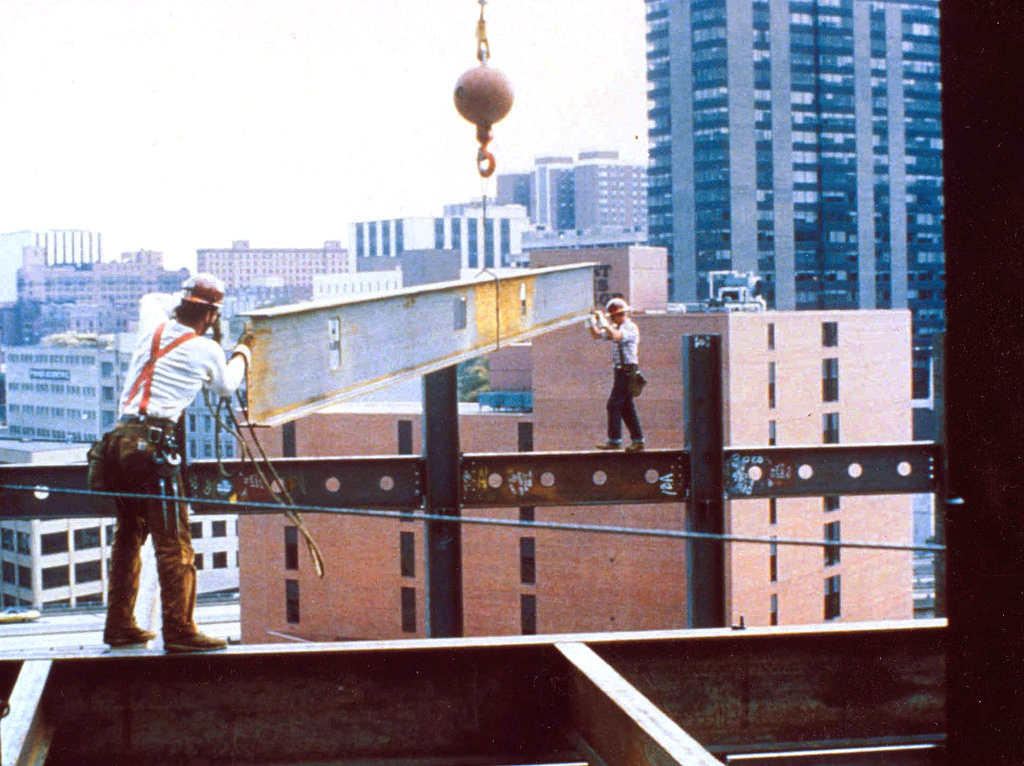
At-risk workers without appropriate safety equipment

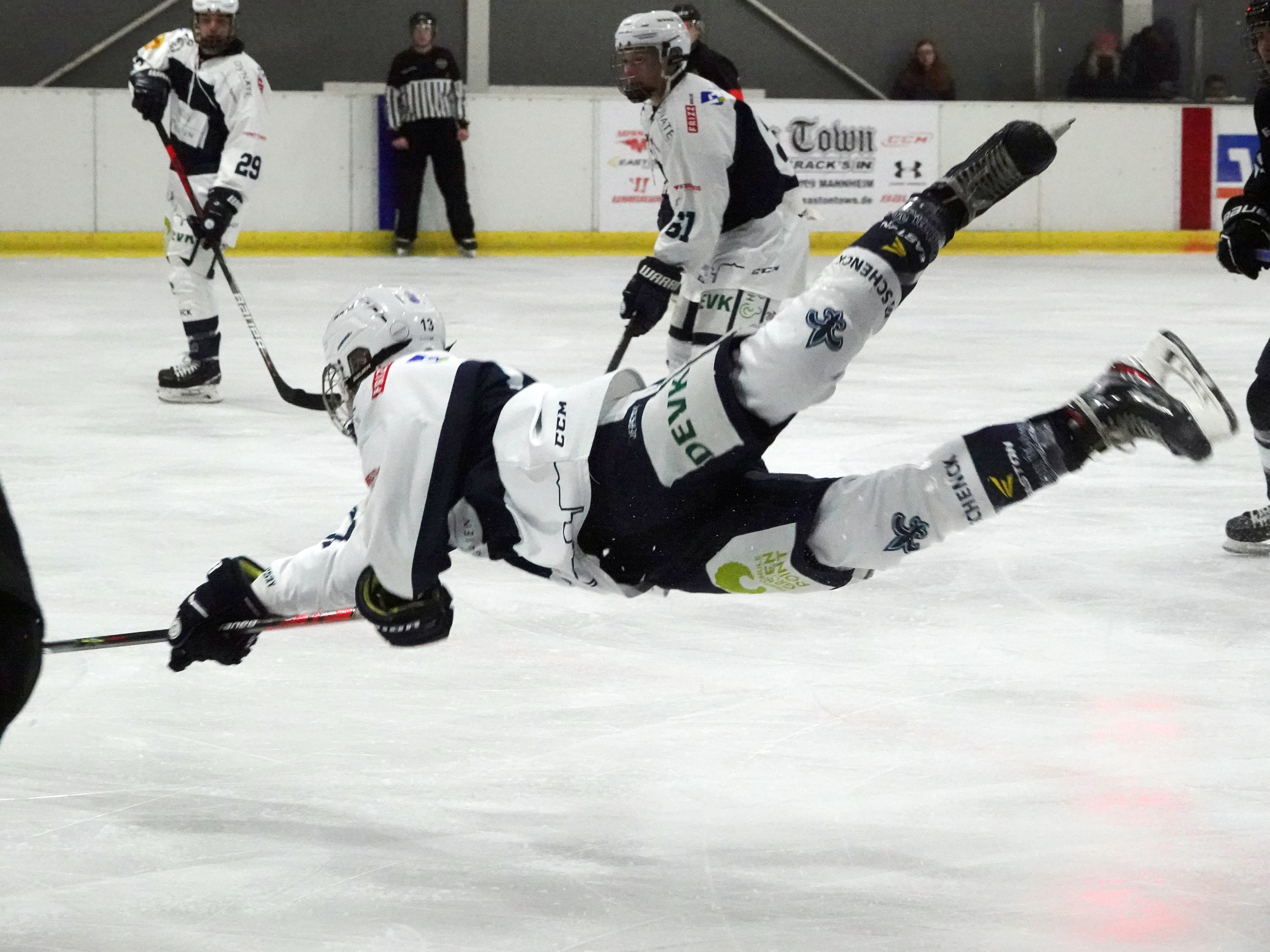
Protectional gear prevents injuries in hockey

In the occupational setting, falling incidents are commonly referred to as slips, trips, and falls (STFs). Falls are an important topic for occupational safety and health services. Any walking/working surface could be a potential fall hazard. An unprotected side or edge which is 6 feet (1.8 m) or more above a lower level should be protected from falling by the use of a guard rail system, safety net system, or personal fall arrest system.

The National Institute for Occupational Safety and Health has compiled certain known risk factors that have been found responsible for STFs in the workplace setting. While falling can occur at any time and by any means in the workplace, these factors have been known to cause same-level falls, which are less likely to occur than falls to a lower level.

Workplace factors: spills on walking surfaces, ice, precipitation (snow/sleet/rain), loose mats or rugs, boxes/containers, poor lighting, uneven walking surfaces

Work organization factors: fast work pace, work tasks involving liquids or greases

Individual factors: age; employee fatigue; failing eyesight / use of bifocals; inappropriate, loose, or poor-fitting footwear

Preventive measures: warning signs

For certain professions such as stunt performers and skateboarders, falling and learning to fall is part of the job.

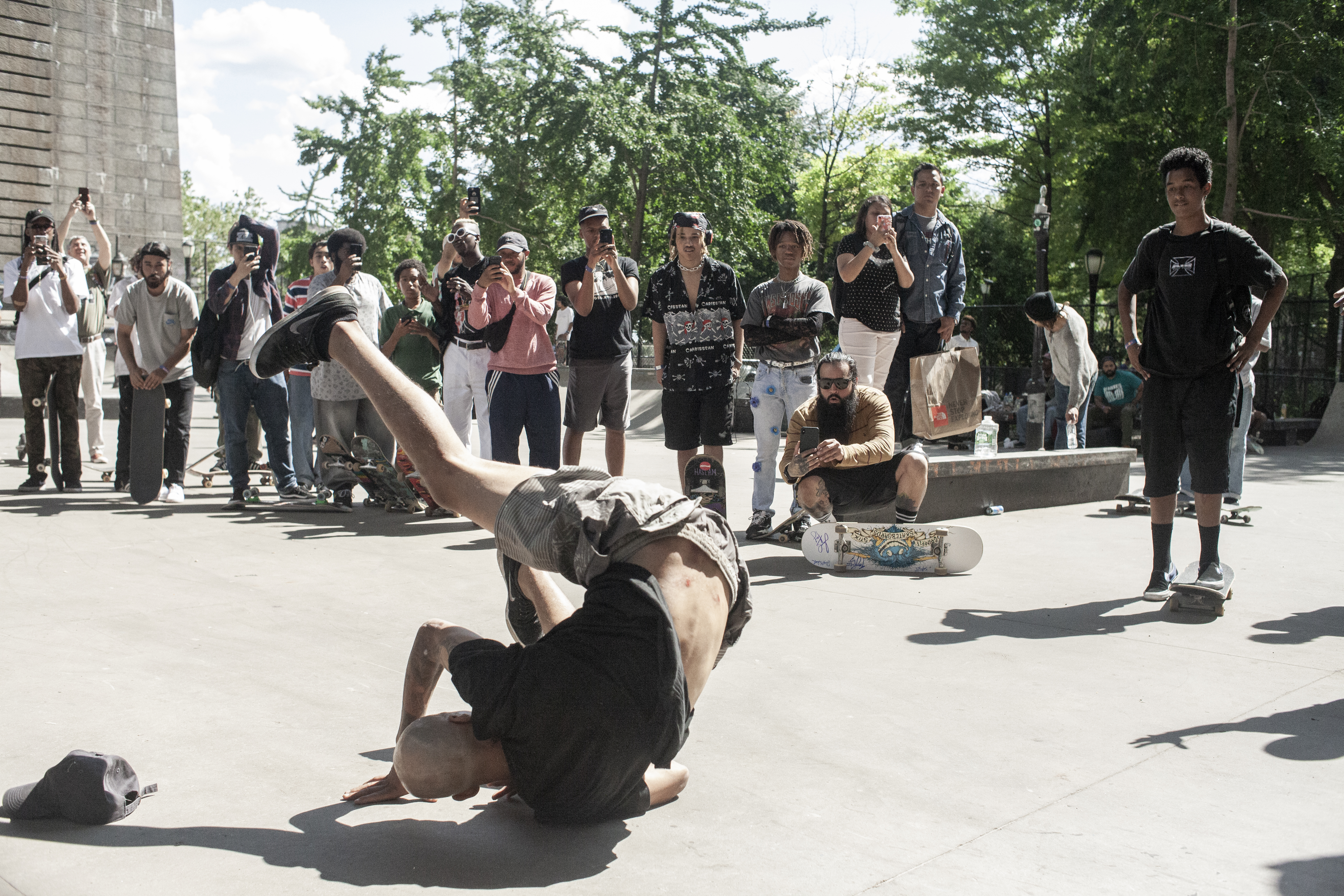
Spectators look on as Starlin Polanco gets up from an attempt during the best trick contest at Coleman Skatepark.

=== Intentional ===
Injurious falls can be caused intentionally; the act of throwing another person out of a window is termed defenestration, and the act of jumping or falling from height is a suicide method.

== Height and severity ==
The severity of injury increases with the height of the fall, but also depends on body and surface features and the manner of the body's impacts against the surface. Breaking the fall with outstretched limbs may result in long bone fractures, joint and soft tissue injuries but can prevent serious trauma to more vital parts of the body such as the head, chest or spine, which can lead to death. The chance of surviving increases if landing on a highly deformable surface (a surface that is easily bent, compressed, or displaced) such as a mattress, haystack, thick snow or water, which decrease the impact of the fall.

Injuries caused by falls from an elevated height vary depending on the building/structure's height, the parts of body impacting the ground, collisions/tetherings along the fall, and the age of the person. Out of the aforementioned, height is the most crucial, as the distance of free fall determines the amount of gravitational acceleration built up before hitting the ground. Falling off a chair, podium, short ladder or bicycle typically causes injuries similar (though potentially more severe) to falling from standing height unless head trauma or penetrating injury to the chest occurs. Falls from a building's second floor/story (American English) or first floor/storey (British English and equivalent idioms in continental European languages) usually cause injuries but are not fatal, and the height at which 50% of children die is between five and six storey heights above the ground.

== Prevention ==
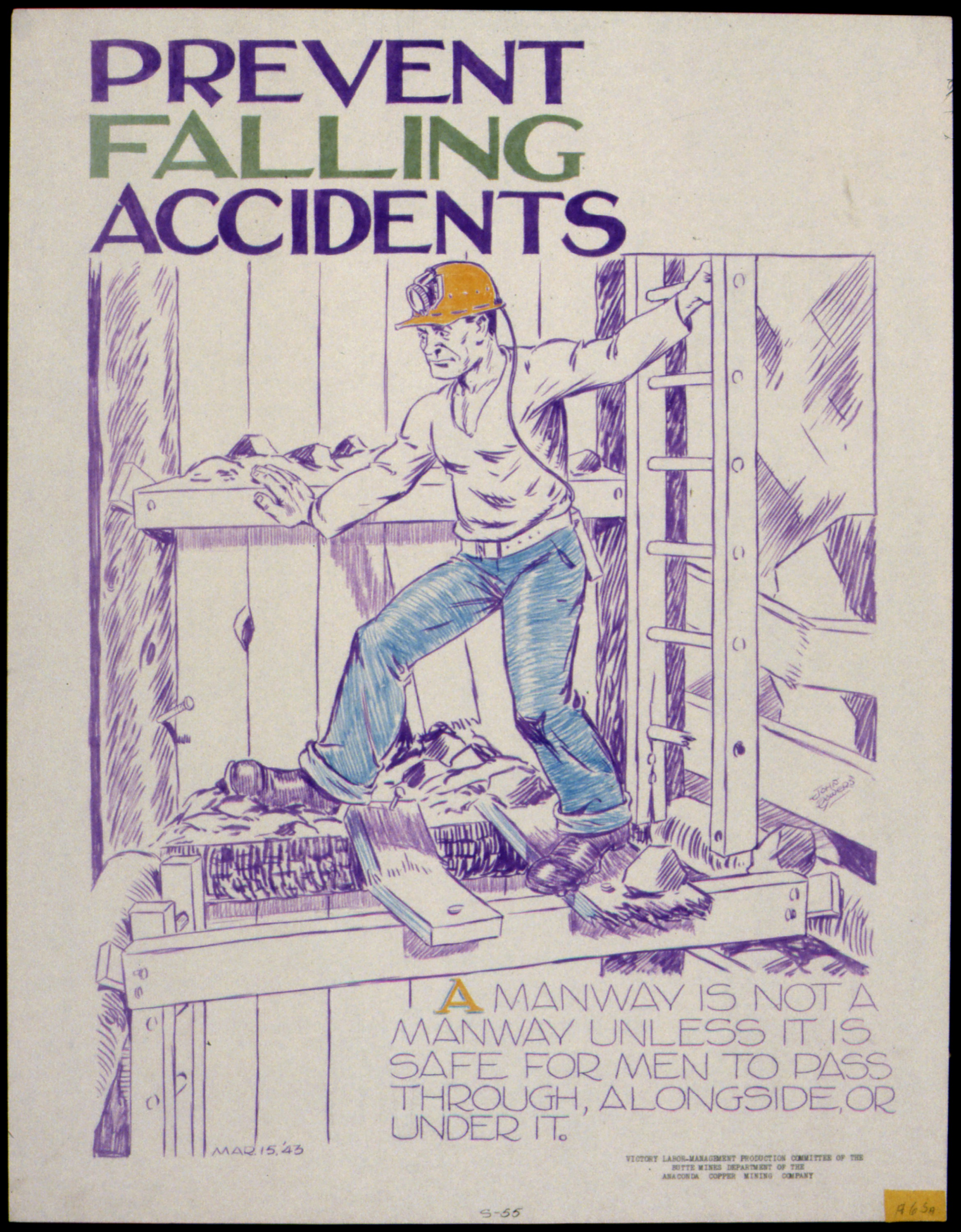
Workplace safety campaigns attempt to reduce injuries from falling.

Long-term exercise appears to decrease the rate of falls in older people. Rates of falls in hospital can be reduced with a number of interventions together by 0.72 from baseline in the elderly. In nursing homes, fall prevention programs that involve a number of interventions prevent recurrent falls. Falls can also be prevented by installing flooring with appropriate amounts of slip resistance for the intended use of the flooring. For instance, a pool deck and an outdoor ramp would need a floor with more wet slip resistance than a floor in a section of a store selling only canned food items. Reliable floor slip resistance testing methods can be very useful in preventing slips and falls in areas expected to get wet or otherwise contaminated in use.

== Epidemiology ==
Death rate from falls Map

In 2013, unintentional falls resulted in an estimated 556,000 deaths globally, up from 341,000 deaths in 1990. They are the second most common cause of death from unintentional injuries after motor vehicle collisions.

=== United States ===
They were the most common cause of injury seen in emergency departments in the United States. One study found that there were nearly 7.9 million emergency department visits involving falls, nearly 35.7% of all encounters. Among children 19 and below, about 8,000 visits to the emergency rooms are registered every day.

In 2000, in the USA 717 workers died of injuries caused by falls from ladders, scaffolds, buildings, or other elevations. More recent data in 2011, found that STFs contributed to 14% of all workplace fatalities in the United States that year.

== Terminal velocity ==
A falling person at low altitude typically reaches terminal velocity of 190 km/h (120 mph) after about 12 seconds, falling some 450 m (1,500 ft) in that time. Without alterations to their aerodynamic profile, the person maintains this speed without falling any faster. Terminal velocity at higher altitudes is greater due to the thinner atmosphere and consequent lower air resistance.

JAT flight attendant Vesna Vulović survived a fall of 10,000 metres (33,000 ft) on 26 January 1972, pinned within the broken fuselage of the DC-9 of JAT Flight 367. The plane was brought down by explosives planted by Croatian Ustaše over Srbská Kamenice in the former Czechoslovakia (now the Czech Republic). The Serbian flight attendant suffered a broken skull, three broken vertebrae (one crushed completely), and was in a coma for 27 days. In an interview, she commented that, according to the man who found her, "…I was in the middle part of the plane. I was found with my head down and my colleague on top of me. One part of my body with my leg was in the plane and my head was out of the plane. A catering trolley was pinned against my spine and kept me in the plane. The man who found me, says I was very lucky. He was in the German Army as a medic during World War Two. He knew how to treat me at the site of the accident."

In World War II there were several reports of military aircrew surviving long falls from severely damaged aircraft: Flight Sergeant Nicholas Alkemade jumped at 5,500 metres (18,000 ft) without a parachute and survived as he hit pine trees and soft snow. He suffered a sprained leg. Staff Sergeant Alan Magee exited his aircraft at 6,700 metres (22,000 ft) without a parachute and survived as he crashed through the glass roof of Saint-Nazaire train station. Lieutenant Ivan Chisov bailed out at 7,000 metres (23,000 ft). While he had a parachute, his plan was to delay opening it as he had been in the midst of an air-battle and was concerned about getting shot while hanging below the parachute. He lost consciousness due to lack of oxygen and hit a snow-covered slope while still unconscious. While he suffered severe injuries, he was able to fly again in three months.

It was reported that two of the victims of the Lockerbie bombing survived for a brief period after hitting the ground (with the forward nose section fuselage in freefall mode), but died from their injuries before help arrived.

Juliane Koepcke survived a long free fall resulting from the 24 December 1971, crash of LANSA Flight 508 (a LANSA Lockheed Electra OB-R-941 commercial airliner) in the Peruvian rainforest. The airplane was struck by lightning during a severe thunderstorm and exploded in mid air, disintegrating 3.2 km (2 mi) up. Koepcke, who was 17 years old at the time, fell to earth still strapped into her seat. The German Peruvian teenager survived the fall with only a broken collarbone, a gash to her right arm, and her right eye swollen shut.

As an example of "freefall survival" that was not as extreme as sometimes reported in the press, a skydiver from Staffordshire was said to have plunged 1,800 m (6,000 ft) without a parachute in Russia and survived. James Boole said that he was supposed to have been given a signal by another skydiver to open his parachute, but it came two seconds too late. Boole, who was filming the other skydiver for a television documentary, landed on snow-covered rocks and suffered a broken back and rib. While he was lucky to survive, this was not a case of true freefall survival, because he was flying a wingsuit, greatly decreasing his vertical speed. This was over descending terrain with deep snow cover, and he impacted while his parachute was beginning to deploy. Over the years, other skydivers have survived accidents where the press has reported that no parachute was open, yet they were actually being slowed by a small area of tangled parachute. They might still be very lucky to survive, but an impact at 130 km/h (80 mph) is much less severe than the 190 km/h (120 mph) that might occur in normal freefall.

Parachute jumper and stuntman Luke Aikins successfully jumped without a parachute from about 7,600 metres (25,000 ft) into a 930-square-metre (10,000 sq ft) net in California, US, on 30 July 2016.
