= Falls survived without a parachute =

This article lists notable falls survived without a parachute. Some heights are difficult to verify due to lack of documentation and are approximated.

Name	Image	Distance of fall		Date	Notes and References
Name	Image	Feet	Meters	Date	Notes and References
Vesna Vulović		33,330	10,160	1972	Flight attendant from Serbia who was the sole survivor of an airplane bombing mid-air. Likely landed in part of fuselage in heavily wooded and snow-covered mountainside. Suffered many bone fractures.
Luke Aikins		25,000	7,620	2016	On July 30, 2016, Aikins jumped from an aircraft without any parachute or wingsuit at an altitude of 25,000 feet (7,620 m) above Simi Valley, California, watched by a live audience. After about two minutes of free fall he successfully landed in a 100-by-100-foot (30 by 30 m) net.
Ivan Chisov		23,000	7,000	1942	Soviet Air Force lieutenant who was shot down by Germans during World War II, and skid down a ravine when his parachute failed to open. Suffered severe spinal injuries.
Alan Magee		22,000	6,700	1943	American airman who was shot down by Germans and crashed through the glass roof of the St. Nazaire railroad station. Suffered several broken bones, severe damage to his nose and eye, lung and kidney damage, and a nearly severed right arm
Nicholas Alkemade		18,000	5,500	1944	British Royal Air Force rear gunner survived a fall with only some bruising and a twisted knee. Landed in deep snow drift in a pine forest near Berlin.
Larisa Savitskaya		17,130	5,220	1981	Sole survivor of Aeroflot Flight 811 who was in an aircraft fragment after the mid-air collision, which landed in a swampy glade.
Bear Grylls		16,000	4,870	1996	British soldier in Kenya whose parachute failed to deploy during training with 21 SAS(R) in Zambia. He broke his back in several places.
Christine McKenzie		11,000	3,400	2004	South African skydiver who hit power lines and fractured pelvic bone.
Juliane Koepcke		10,000	3,200	1971	Sole survivor of the LANSA Flight 508 plane crash, landed in seat and suffered broken collarbone and other injuries; hiked for 11 days through Peruvian rainforest to safety.
James Boole		6,000	1,800	2009	British skydiver who landed in snow in Russia. Broke back and rib, but was walking within a week.
Victoria Cilliers		4,000	1,219	2015	Survived a murder attempt when her husband had tampered with her main and reserve parachutes. Landed on a soft, newly ploughed field.
Liang-feng Chin		1,250	381	2018	Soldier whose parachute failed to deploy during the Han Kuang exercise. He suffered severe injuries and was hospitalized for 40 days.
Ryōyū Kobayashi		954	291	2024	This is the unofficial world record for the longest ski jump, 291m. The event occurred on April the 24th.
Joshua Hanson		200	60	2007	This accident occurred in January 2007 as Hanson ran from an elevator, losing his balance and falling through a window from the 17th floor to the ground landing on his feet, he suffered internal bleeding and had several broken bones.
Tim Stilwell		15th Floor (~150)	~45	2013	Locked out of his apartment in June 2013, decided the best course of actions was to attempt to hang and fall onto his neighbour's balcony. Slipped from the 15th floor. (~150 feet^{assuming each floor is 10 ft.}) and landed on the roof of a building at ground level. Some suggest the roof broke his fall, medical experts state he was very lucky to have survived the fall. His injuries were; broken bones, internal bruising. However Stilman was expected to make a full recovery.
Daisy McCumber		11 Floor (~140 feet)	~43	1946	During the Winecoff Hotel Fire on December 7, 1946, McCumber leapt from an eleventh story window, falling some 140 feet (the hotel was 15 stories and 188 feet, roughly 12.5 feet per floor). 119 people perished in the fire, 32 of whom died jumping or falling. McCumber is one of two people known to have survived the fire by jumping (the other survivor was teenager Dorothy Moen who survived a fall from the 7th floor). A photograph by Arnold Hardy showing McCumber falling won a 1947 Pulitzer Prize.
Yuan Huangtou		108	33	c. 559	Huangtou was a prisoner, who was set on an experiment conducted by Gao Yang with a few other prisoners to be executed via launching themselves gliding off of the 108-foot tall Phoenix Tower in Ye, capital of Northern Qi. Huangtou was the only individual to survive, gliding over the city wall, landing at Zimo, the western segment of Ye. He was handed to Bi Yiyun who executed him via starvation later.
Danny Yamashiro		100	30	1985	On December 22, 1985, whilst attempting to rescue his stranded girlfriend from a 20-foot (6.1-meter) in height fall that occurred from mountain climbing, Yamashiro slipped and fell headfirst 300 feet (90 meters) and later another 100 feet (30 meters). The second fall took place during a rescue effort and was captured on film. It aired on newscasts throughout Hawaii. He suffered severe head injuries, skull fractures, multiple tears in his scalp, a shattered ankle, damaged organs, extensive lacerations, and became comatose.
Davide Capello		100	30	2018	One of the survivors of Ponte Morandi bridge collapse, which occurred on 14 August 2018; Capello's car fell 30 metres (100 feet), however he managed to walk away unscathed.
