= Pointe des Berons =

Mountain of the Mont Blanc Massif

- Location within Alps

Highest point
- Elevation: 2,954 m (9,692 ft)
- Prominence: 24 m (79 ft)
- Coordinates: 46°00′22″N 6°59′04″E

Geography
- Location: Valais, Switzerland; Haute-Savoie, France
- Parent range: Mont Blanc Massif

The Pointe des Berons is a mountain of the Mont Blanc Massif, located on the border between Switzerland and France. It lies approximately halfway between the Col de Balme and the Aiguille du Tour. The east (Swiss) side is covered by the Glacier des Berons.
