= Mark Sutton =

British stuntman (1971–2013)

- Born: 13 April 1971; United Kingdom
- Died: 14 August 2013 (aged 42); Mont Blanc
- Cause of death: Wingsuit flying accident
- Citizenship: British

Mark Sutton (13 April 1971 – 14 August 2013) was a British stuntman who took part in the 2012 Summer Olympics opening ceremony by parachuting from a helicopter above the stadium as James Bond. He died in a wingsuit flying accident near Les Grandes Otanes in Switzerland. He had been travelling at around 125 miles per hour (201 km/h) when he hit a ridge.

== Life ==
Mark Sutton was the son of Air Marshal Sir John Matthias Dobson Sutton KCB, former Lieutenant-Governor of the Island of Jersey, and Lady Angela Sutton. He was educated at Royal Military Academy Sandhurst where he won the Sword of Honour. He received an officer's commission in the 6th Queen Elizabeth's Own Gurkha Rifles in December 1991, and served as an Army Officer until 1995. Upon leaving the Army, he changed career and moved into finance in the city of London. When he died, Sutton was working as a consultant for The Royal Bank of Scotland.

== London 2012 Olympics ==
During a segment of the opening ceremony of the 2012 Summer Olympics entitled "Happy and Glorious", Sutton served as a stunt double of James Bond on a helicopter in a filmed portion of the segment. Alongside his friend Gary Connery (who was The Queen's double for the segment), Sutton skydived out of the helicopter above the Olympic Stadium. Following the ceremony, the sequence was described as one of its highlights by the media.

== Death ==
In August 2013, Mark Sutton and 20 other top wingsuiters were invited to a three-day event in Chamonix, France known as Helibase 74, which was organised by Epic TV, a web TV channel specialising in extreme sports. In exchange for video footage of their flights, the website provided accommodations and helicopter access. On 14 August 2013, Sutton jumped alongside Tony Uragallo (both equipped with multiple video cameras) in a short "warm-up" flight near Les Grandes Otanes scheduled to last about a minute. However, tragedy struck only 20 seconds into the flight; as he jumped from the helicopter at 10,800 feet (3,300 m), travelling at speeds of up to 155 mph (249 km/h), Sutton veered off-course and crashed into a mountain ridge. A rescue helicopter arrived soon after Sutton hit the ground, but he was pronounced dead at the scene—Sutton's impact was so severe that a DNA test was required to identify his body, and a spokesperson stated that he had no chance of surviving the impact. While Sutton was equipped with a parachute during the flight for landing, it was left unused. As part of the investigation, the video footage from Uragallo's cameras were handed over to a Swiss police unit.

An Epic TV spokesperson considered Sutton's death to be an accident, noting that two successful flights with other wingsuiters were held prior, and that they had planned to be "conservative" that day due to the large number of flights planned. The remaining participants in the event elected to continue on in honour of Sutton.

His death was regarded as a major loss to the community of wingsuit flying, among whom he was considered to be one of the world's best. Among those to pay tribute to Sutton were Sebastian Coe, Gary Connery, and Danny Boyle who said that his death was a "huge loss to his profession".
