= Croix de Fer =

Mountain in Switzerland

- Location within Switzerland

Highest point
- Elevation: 2,343 m (7,687 ft)
- Prominence: 143 m (469 ft)
- Parent peak: Mont Blanc
- Coordinates: 46°2′11.2″N 6°58′34.4″E

Geography
- Location: Valais, Switzerland
- Parent range: Mont Blanc Massif

The Croix de fer (2,343 m) is a mountain of the Mont Blanc Massif, overlooking Trient in the canton of Valais. It is located north of the Tête de Balme and L'Arolette and it is the culminating point of the group between the Col des Montets and the Col de Balme.
