= Gary Connery =

British skydiver, BASE jumper, and stuntman

Gary Connery (born 18 June 1969) is a British skydiver, BASE jumper, and professional stuntperson. Connery has performed stunt-work in numerous films. He has also acted as the stunt-double for Gary Oldman, Leonardo DiCaprio, Rowan Atkinson, and John Hurt. He is acknowledged as the first skydiver to land after a wingsuit jump without using a parachute. He made his first parachute jump at age 23, as part of his army training.

He was the stunt-double of the Queen during one of the parts of 2012 Summer Olympics opening ceremony. He has performed 880 skydives and 450 BASE jumps. He has jumped from locations such as the Eiffel Tower, Nelson's Column, the London Eye, London's Tower Bridge, and from inside the Millennium Dome.

He was jailed for 18 months in 2022 for causing grievous bodily harm to his girlfriend by pushing her down the stairs in their house.

== Eiffel Tower ==
Connery jumped through the centre of the Eiffel Tower on a rainy day with winds gusting at 25 mph (40 km/h).

== Nelson's Column ==
On 9 May 2003 Connery jumped off Nelson's Column at Trafalgar Square in Central London in what was described as a "death-defying protest stunt" which was organised by Act For Tibet, in support of the Dalai Lama.

He climbed the 170 feet (52 m) monument without a safety harness and jumped from the top, landing using a parachute. At the end of the jump he was arrested along with three other protesters. Connery admitted that the jump was "frightening".

Connery was the first person to jump from Nelson's Column because up to that point the height of the monument was viewed as insufficient to allow for a successful jump.

== World's first wingsuit landing without a parachute ==
On 23 May 2012 Connery made his wingsuit jump from a helicopter flying at a height of 2,400 feet (730 m) over Ridge Wood in Buckinghamshire near his hometown of Henley-on-Thames, Oxfordshire. Coming back from California (Perris Valley) in 2003, where he did his first wingsuit flight, he said: "that could be landed!" and he went for a week to do wingsuit flight training at Empuriabrava on the coast of Spain, the largest dropzone in Europe. Before the final attempt, he had made two test flights landing with a parachute. He had also trained for weeks in Italy and Switzerland in preparation for the jump. He had to obtain permission from the Civil Aviation Authority for the dive. The flight was filmed by Mark Sutton.

=== Flight ===
Three seconds into his record-setting flight, his wingsuit inflated, its airflow dynamics enabled controlled gliding, and his speed reached about 80 mph (130 km/h). At approximately 200 feet (61 m) over the landing strip, he changed the configuration of his wingsuit so as to decrease the gliding and vertical (falling) components of his velocity to 50 mph (80 km/h) and 15 mph (24 km/h) respectively.

Just before the final approach, Connery briefly appeared to lose control but quickly recovered. For added safety during landing, Connery wore a neck brace.

=== Landing ===
Connery landed safely on a strip made of approximately 18,600 cardboard boxes. The landing strip area was 350 feet (110 m) long by 45 feet (14 m) wide and its maximum height was 12 feet (3.7 m). The landing strip included separate layers each featuring cardboard boxes with varying dimensions.

It took Connery about thirty seconds to emerge from the cardboard boxes. Connery mentioned that although on the way down he experienced turbulence, the landing was "soft and comfortable".

The landing was attended by about a hundred spectators. The landing rig, also known as the box rig, was constructed on the outskirts of Henley on Thames.

=== Reaction ===
Landing in a wingsuit without using a parachute had been one of Jeb Corliss's main objectives since 2010. Corliss and other top-level wingsuit jumpers had tried for years to design wingsuits similar to the one which Connery helped design and subsequently used for his record-setting leap.

In the beginning, Corliss thought that Connery's stunt was an April Fool's joke and that the stunt Connery was attempting was impossible. Corliss added that Connery's landing was "one of the most amazing things" he had seen in his life and called it the "greatest stunt ever performed". He also added that "he bears no ill will toward the man who stole his dream" and that he goes by the Samurai code by giving respect to his opponent. Corliss also expressed surprise that Connery chose to land head-first, risking a neck injury.

The New York Times has compared Connery's jump to a superhero's. Flying Magazine has called the jump a "history-making stunt" and mentioned that Connery had confidence he would succeed because of the "excellent control" he had over his suit. The commentary also added that the risk factors should not be underestimated.

Connery's landing was studied as an extreme example of the effectiveness of shock absorbing material. Rhett Allain, associate professor of Physics at Southeastern Louisiana University, has analysed Connery's flight in Wired magazine's science blog Dot Physics to determine the landing velocities which allowed Connery to remain uninjured. Connery received a nomination for the Epic TV Adventurer of The Year Award.

== Queen's stunt double ==
The plot of one of the skits during the opening ceremonies of the 2012 London Olympics had the Queen go on a secret mission with James Bond played by Daniel Craig. During the mission, the Queen was supposed to ride a helicopter with Bond and parachute at the stadium during the Olympic ceremonies. Connery acted as the Queen's stunt double. During the night of the opening ceremonies, the helicopter carrying Connery and Mark Sutton, who acted as James Bond's double, was given permission to take-off at 8:50 p.m. local time and was then directed to the stadium where it assumed a position, hovering at a height of 800 feet (240 m).

Connery, wearing a salmon dress similar to the one worn by the Queen during the Olympic ceremonies, along with a silver wig, jumped out of the helicopter as did Sutton. Connery then deployed the parachute at 500 feet (150 m) revealing a Union Flag canopy. Shortly after, the real Queen entered London's Olympic stadium to applause. Connery landed at a nearby bridge.

Connery had trained for months for the stunt in the early morning hours to keep it secret. In preparation for the stunt, he met with Angela Kelly, the Queen's dresser so that she could make a replica of the Queen's dress for him and the Queen made her favourite black handbag available to make the stunt look more realistic.

== Films ==
Connery has performed stunts and appeared on television and films such as Die Another Day, The Beach, Batman Begins, and Indiana Jones and the Kingdom of the Crystal Skull.

== Personal life ==
Connery was married to Vivienne, a café owner in Henley-on-Thames, and they have one child.

In July 2022, Connery was found guilty of causing grievous bodily harm to his then girlfriend Tanya Brass. He had pushed her down the stairs in their home in Satwell, Oxfordshire in October 2020 after an argument about who should turn off the light. She suffered a shattered shoulder and a cut to her head. He was jailed for 18 months in August 2022 for the attack. The sentencing judge said of him: "It is abundantly clear ... that you show absolutely no remorse for what happened and you do not seem to accept any fault."

== See also ==
- Luke Aikins

Records
Preceded by none	Highest jump without a parachute (0.730 km); May 23, 2012 – July 30, 2016	Succeeded by Luke Aikins
