= Intoxicated =

Intoxicated may refer to:

- The adjective related to intoxication
- "Intoxicated" (Hinder song), 2015 single
- "Intoxicated", song on Symphony Soldier album by The Cab
- "Intoxicated", 2007 single by Amanda Wilson
- "Intoxicated" (Martin Solveig and GTA song), 2015 single
- Intoxicated (album), a 2003 album by German recording artist Gracia
- "Intoxicated", a song by Lacuna Coil on the album Dark Adrenaline
- "Intoxicated", a song by Obscura on the album Retribution

== See also ==
- Intoxication (disambiguation)
