= Srbská Kamenice =

- Municipality
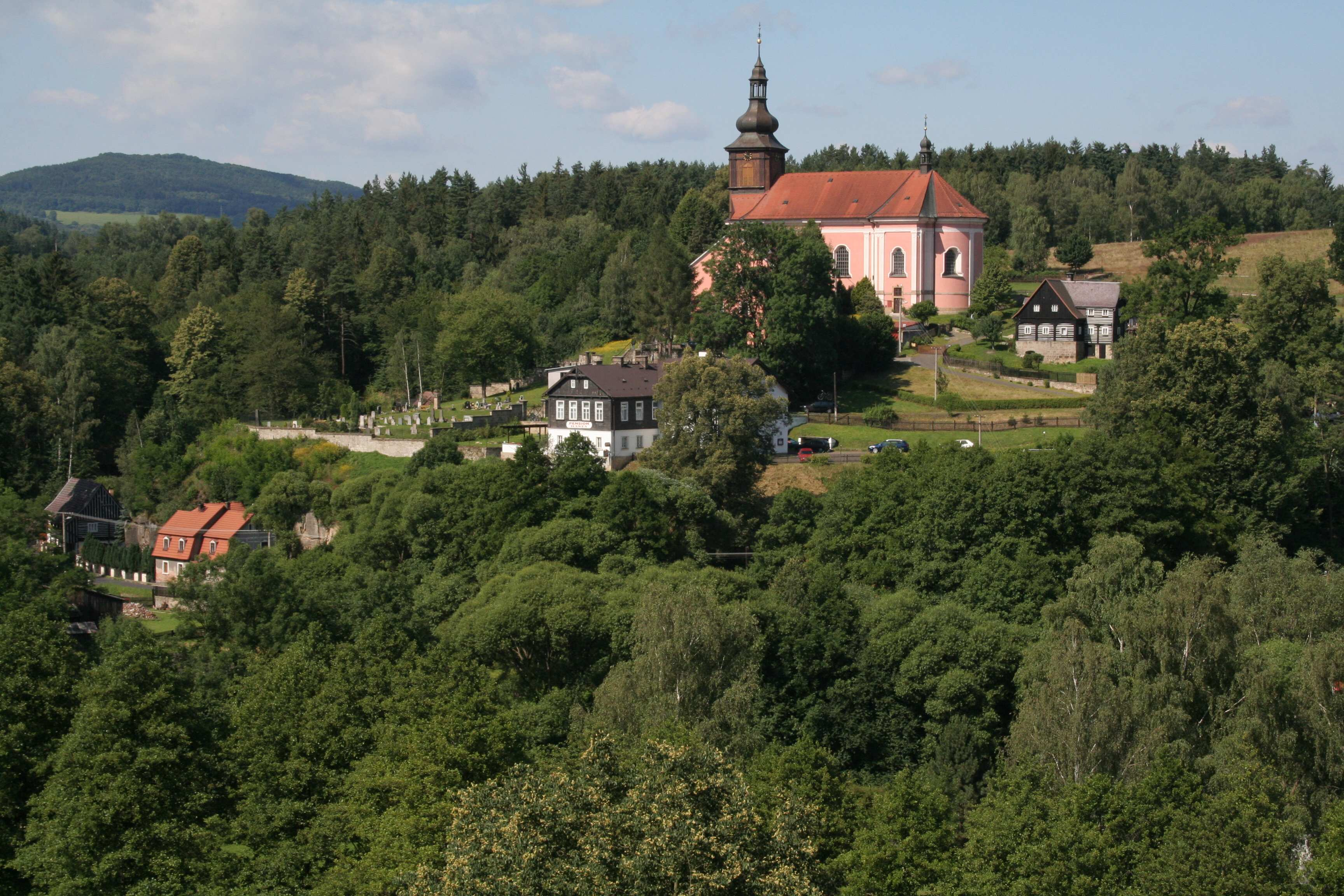
- Church of Saint Wenceslaus

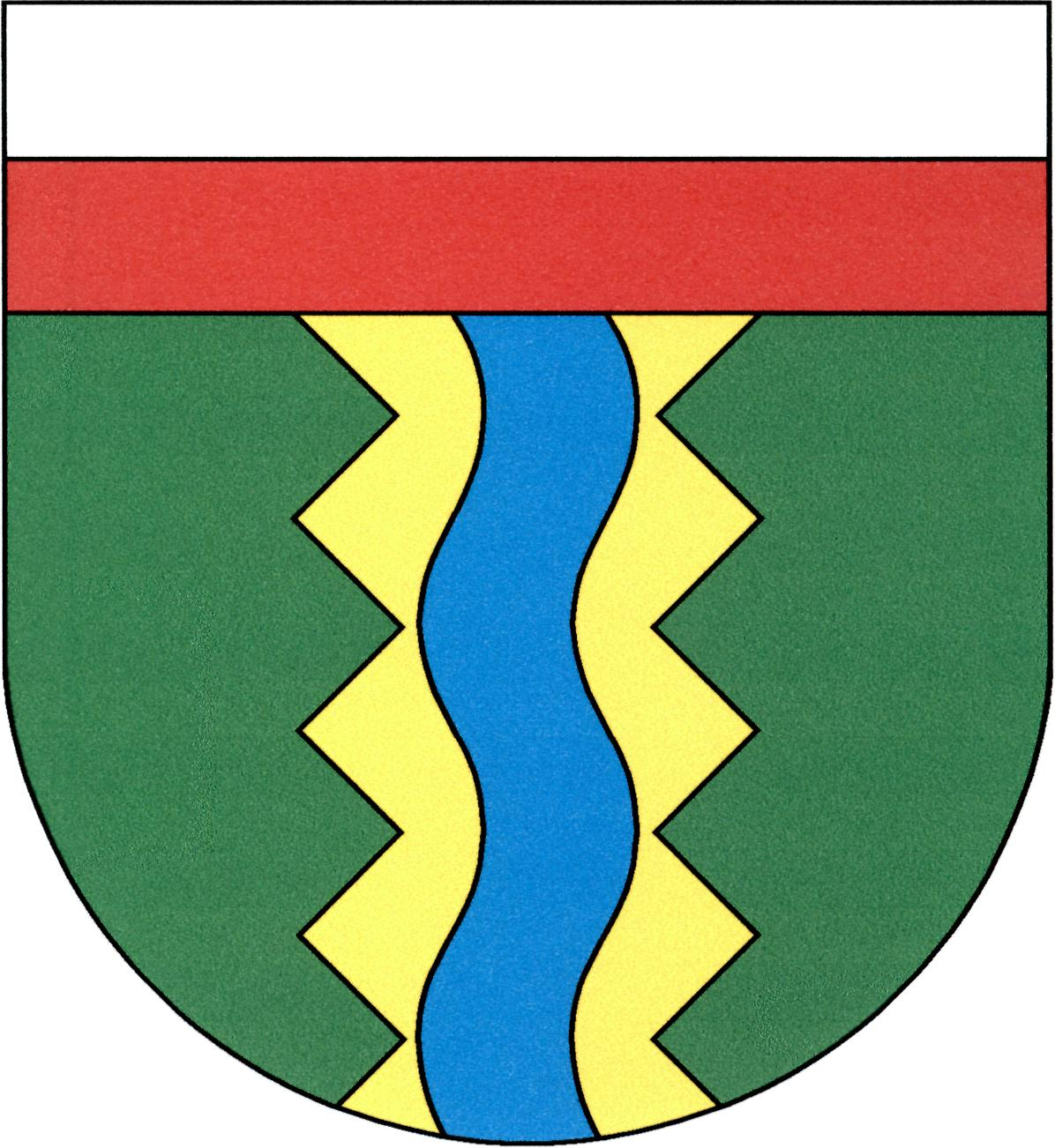
- Flag Coat of arms

- Location in the Czech Republic
- Coordinates: 50°49′14″N 14°21′10″E
- Country: Czech Republic
- Region: Ústí nad Labem
- District: Děčín
- First mentioned: 1352

Area
  - Total: 11.75 km^{2} (4.54 sq mi)
- Elevation: 216 m (709 ft)

Population (2026-01-01)
  - Total: 277
  - Density: 23.6/km^{2} (61.1/sq mi)
- Time zone: UTC+1 (CET)
  - Summer (DST): UTC+2 (CEST)
- Postal code: 407 15
- Website: www.srbska-kamenice.cz

Srbská Kamenice (German: Windisch Kamnitz) is a municipality and village in Děčín District in the Ústí nad Labem Region of the Czech Republic. It has about 300 inhabitants.

== Etymology ==
The village was named after the Kamenice River. The prefix Srbská ('Sorbian') refers to the original inhabitants of the village.

== Geography ==
Srbská Kamenice is located about 10 kilometres (6 mi) northeast of Děčín and 27 km (17 mi) northeast of Ústí nad Labem. It lies in the Elbe Sandstone Mountains. The northern part of the municipality lies in the Bohemian Switzerland National Park. The highest point is a contour line on the slopes of the Růžovský vrch hill at 498 m (1,634 ft) above sea level. The Kamenice River flows through the municipality.

== History ==
The first written mention of Srbská Kamenice is from 1352. It was founded in the early 11th century by Sorbs, refugees from the Holy Roman Empire after a military campaign of Emperor Henry II.

On 26 January 1972, Serbian flight attendant Vesna Vulović was the only person on board to survive the crash of JAT Flight 367 which exploded at an altitude of 10,160 metres (33,330 ft) over the village.

== Demographics ==
Historical population

Year	Pop.	±%
1869	1,044	—
1880	1,102	+5.6%
1890	1,032	−6.4%
1900	941	−8.8%
1910	997	+6.0%

Year	Pop.	±%
1921	905	−9.2%
1930	932	+3.0%
1950	346	−62.9%
1961	329	−4.9%
1970	273	−17.0%

Year	Pop.	±%
1980	218	−20.1%
1991	172	−21.1%
2001	176	+2.3%
2011	229	+30.1%
2021	264	+15.3%

Source: Censuses

== Transport ==
There are no railways or major roads passing through the municipality.

== Sights ==
The main landmark of Srbská Kamenice is the Church of Saint Wenceslaus. It was built in the Baroque style in 1772–1776.

There is an open-air museum of Czechoslovak border fortifications, built in 1937–1938. It consists of a number of reinforced concrete fortresses.
