= Vesna Vulović =

Serbian flight attendant (1950–2016)

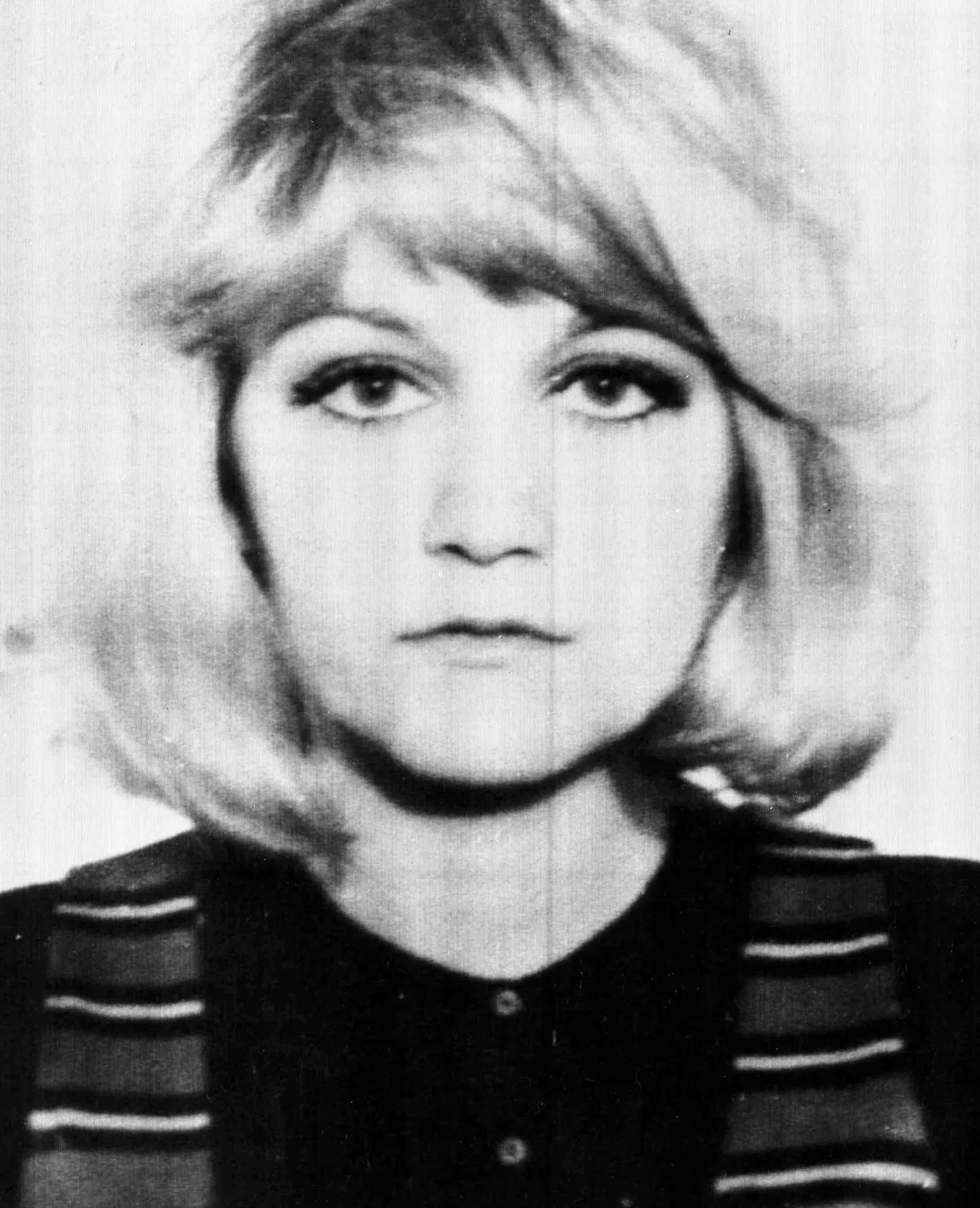
- Vulović in the early 1970s
- Born: 3 January 1950; Belgrade, PR Serbia, FPR Yugoslavia
- Died: 23 December 2016 (aged 66); Belgrade, Serbia
- Resting place: New Cemetery, Belgrade
- Occupation: Flight attendant
- Known for: Surviving JAT Flight 367
- Spouse: Nikola Breka (m. 1977, divorced)
- Relatives: Aleksa Vulović (nephew)

Vesna Vulović (Serbian Cyrillic: Весна Вуловић, pronounced [ʋêsna ʋûːloʋitɕ]; 3 January 1950 – 23 December 2016) was a Serbian flight attendant who survived the highest fall without a parachute: 10,160 metres (33,330 feet; 6.31 miles). She was the sole survivor of JAT Flight 367 after an explosion tore through the baggage compartment on 26 January 1972, causing it to crash near Srbská Kamenice, Czechoslovakia (now part of the Czech Republic). Air safety investigators attributed the explosion to a briefcase bomb. The Yugoslav authorities suspected that émigré Croatian nationalists were to blame, but no one was ever arrested.

Following the bombing, Vulović spent days in a coma and was hospitalized for several months. She suffered a fractured skull, three broken vertebrae, broken legs, broken ribs, and a fractured pelvis. These injuries resulted in her being temporarily paralyzed from the waist down. Vulović made an almost complete recovery but continued to walk with a limp. She had little to no memory of the incident and had no fear of flying in the aftermath of the crash. Despite her willingness to resume work as a flight attendant, JAT Airways gave her a desk job negotiating freight contracts, feeling her presence on flights would attract too much publicity. Vulović became a celebrity in Yugoslavia and was deemed a national hero.

Vulović was fired from JAT in the early 1990s after taking part in anti-government protests during the breakup of Yugoslavia, but was not arrested as the government was concerned about the negative publicity that her imprisonment would bring. She continued her work as a pro-democracy activist until the Socialist Party of Serbia was ousted from power during the Bulldozer Revolution of October 2000. Vulović later campaigned on behalf of the Democratic Party, advocating for Serbia's entry into the European Union. Her final years were spent in seclusion, and she struggled with survivor's guilt. Having divorced, she lived alone in her Belgrade apartment on a small pension until her death in 2016.

== Early life ==
Vesna Vulović was born in Belgrade on 3 January 1950. Her father was a businessman and her mother was a fitness instructor. Driven by her love of the Beatles, Vulović travelled to the United Kingdom after completing her first year of university, hoping to improve her English language skills. "I initially stayed with my parents' friends in Newbury," she recalled, "but wanted to move to London. It was there that I met up with a friend who suggested we go to Stockholm. When I told my parents I was living in the Swedish capital, they thought of the drugs and the sex and told me to come home at once." Upon returning to Belgrade, Vulović decided to become a flight attendant after seeing one of her friends in a flight attendant's uniform. "She looked so nice and had just been to London for the day," Vulović recalled. "I thought, 'Why shouldn't I be an air hostess? I could go to London once a month'." She joined JAT, the national flag carrier and dominant airline of Yugoslavia, in 1971.

== JAT Flight 367 ==
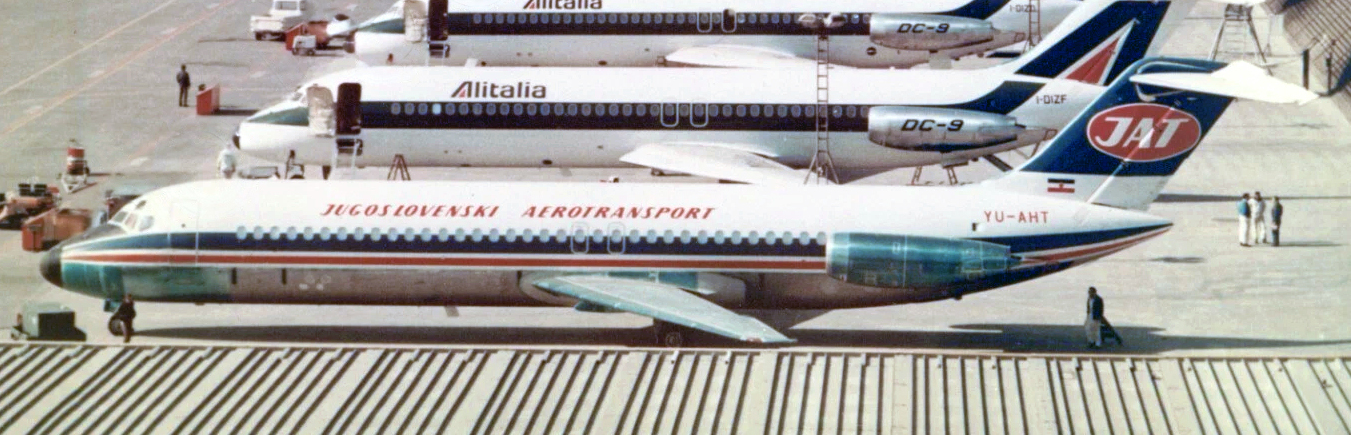
YU-AHT, the JAT McDonnell Douglas DC-9 involved, pictured in 1971

The secondary crew of JAT Flight 367, flying from Stockholm to Belgrade with stopovers in Copenhagen and Zagreb, arrived in Denmark on the morning of 25 January 1972. According to Vulović, she was not scheduled to be on Flight 367, and JAT had confused her for another flight attendant also named Vesna. Nevertheless, Vulović said that she was excited to travel to Denmark because it was her first time visiting the country. The crew had the entire afternoon and the following morning to themselves. Vulović wished to go sightseeing but her colleagues insisted that they go shopping. "Everybody wanted to buy something for his or her family," she recalled. "So I had to go shopping with them. They seemed to know that they would die. They didn't talk about it, but I saw ... I felt for them. And the captain was locked in his room for 24 hours. He didn't want to go out at all. In the morning, during breakfast, the co-pilot was talking about his son and daughter as if nobody else had a son or daughter."

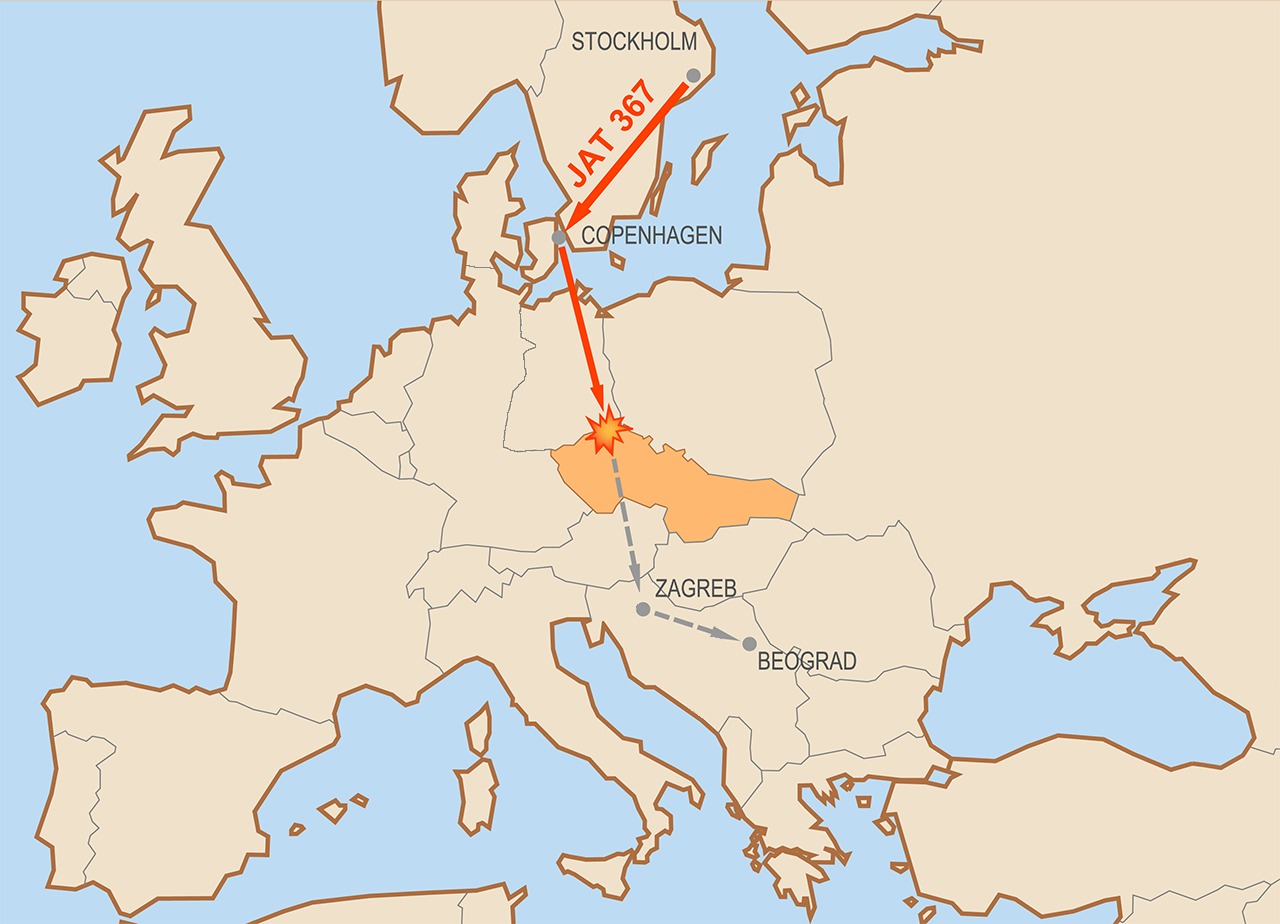
Intended route of JAT Flight 367

Flight 367 departed from Stockholm Arlanda Airport at 1:30 p.m. on 26 January. The aircraft, a McDonnell Douglas DC-9, landed at Copenhagen Airport at 2:30 p.m., whereupon Vulović and her colleagues boarded the plane. "As it was late, we were in the terminal and saw it park," Vulović said. "I saw all the passengers and crew deplane. One man seemed terribly annoyed. It was not only me that noticed him either. Other crew members saw him, as did the station manager in Copenhagen. I think it was the man who put the bomb in the baggage. I think he had checked in a bag in Stockholm, got off in Copenhagen and never re-boarded the flight."

Flight 367 departed from Copenhagen Airport at 3:15 p.m. At 4:01 p.m., an explosion tore through the DC-9's baggage compartment. The explosion caused the aircraft to break apart over the Czechoslovak village of Srbská Kamenice. Vulović was the only survivor of the 28 passengers and crew. She was discovered by villager Bruno Honke, who heard her screaming amid the wreckage. Her turquoise uniform was covered in blood and her stiletto heels had been torn off by the force of the impact. Honke had been a medic during the Second World War and was able to keep Vulović alive until rescuers arrived.

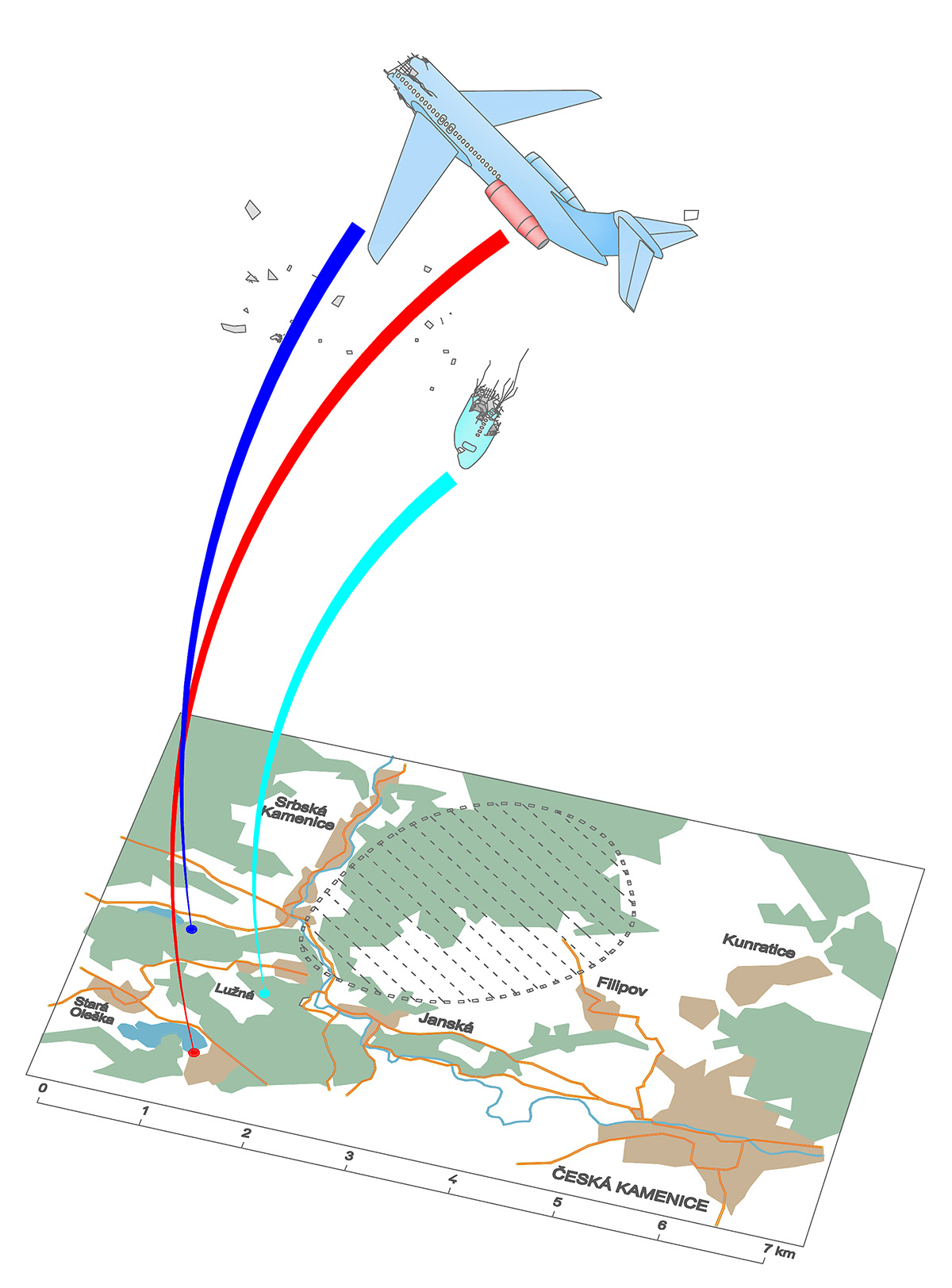
Debris distribution of Flight 367

Air safety investigators attributed Vulović's survival to her being trapped by a food trolley in the DC-9's fuselage as it broke away from the rest of the aircraft and plummeted towards the ground. When the cabin depressurized, the passengers and other flight crew were blown out of the aircraft and fell to their deaths. Investigators believed that the fuselage, with Vulović pinned inside, landed at an angle in a heavily wooded and snow-covered mountainside, which cushioned the impact. (Note: On the basis of her conversations with Honke, Vulović disputed the assertion that she was discovered in the rear section of the DC-9, as claimed in some reports. "The man who found me ... told me that I was in the middle part of the plane," she said. "I was found with my head down and my colleague on top of me. One part of my body with my leg was in the plane and my head was out of the plane. A catering trolley was pinned against my spine and kept me in the plane.") Vulović's physicians concluded that her history of low blood pressure caused her to pass out quickly after the cabin depressurized and kept her heart from bursting on impact. Vulović said that she was aware of her low blood pressure before applying to become a flight attendant and knew that it would result in her failing her medical examination, but she drank an excessive amount of coffee beforehand and was accepted.

Between 1962 and 1982, émigré Croatian nationalists carried out 128 terrorist attacks against Yugoslav civilian and military targets. Yugoslav authorities suspected that they were to blame for bringing down Flight 367. On the day of the crash, a bomb exploded aboard a train travelling from Vienna to Zagreb, injuring six. A man, describing himself as a Croatian nationalist, called the Swedish newspaper Kvällsposten the following day and claimed responsibility for the bombing of Flight 367. Despite this, he was not arrested. The Czechoslovak Civil Aviation Authority later attributed the explosion to a briefcase bomb.

== Paralysis and recovery ==
Following the crash, Vulović spent days in a coma, having fractured her skull and suffered a cerebral haemorrhage. (Note: The length of time that Vulović was comatose is the subject of considerable contradiction, with different sources indicating three days, ten days, and 27 days. A report issued by the Yugoslav state-owned news agency Tanjug in early February 1972 states that "[Vulović has] emerged from her coma ... is able to speak and read and is chatting in English with her doctors.") She also suffered two broken legs and three broken vertebrae, one of which was crushed completely. Her pelvis was fractured and several ribs broken. Her injuries resulted in her being temporarily paralyzed below the waist. She had total amnesia from the hour preceding her fall until one month afterwards. She first learned of the crash about two weeks after it occurred, when her parents told her. She fainted upon being shown a newspaper headline by her doctor and had to be tranquillized. The last thing that Vulović could remember from before the crash was greeting passengers as they boarded. The next thing she remembered was seeing her parents in her hospital room about one month later.

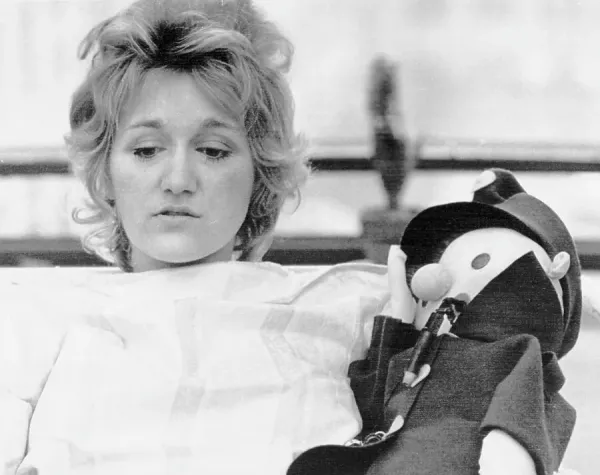
Vulovic in a Prague hospital

Vulović underwent treatment in a Prague hospital until 12 March 1972, after which she was flown to Belgrade. She was offered a hypnotic injection to help her sleep during the flight back to Yugoslavia, but declined, explaining that she was not afraid of flying because she had no memory of the crash. In Belgrade, Vulović's hospital room was placed under 24-hour police protection because authorities feared that the perpetrators of the bombing would wish to kill her. The guards changed shifts every six hours, and no one was allowed in to see her except for her parents and doctors. Vulović's hospitalization lasted until June 1972, after which she travelled to Montenegro to recuperate at a seaside resort, where her doctors visited her every two or three days.

Vulović underwent several operations to restore her movement. Initially, she could move only her left leg, but within one month, she regained the ability to move her right one, as well. Within ten months, Vulović had regained the ability to walk, but continued to walk with a limp for the rest of her life due to her spinal injury. In total, she spent sixteen months recuperating. "Nobody ever expected me to live this long," she recounted in 2008. Vulović attributed her recovery to her "Serbian stubbornness" and "a childhood diet that included chocolate, spinach, and fish oil". A year after the accident, she was planning on using insurance payments to help her parents to purchase a car, after they had to sell their old one to cover some debt.

== Fame ==
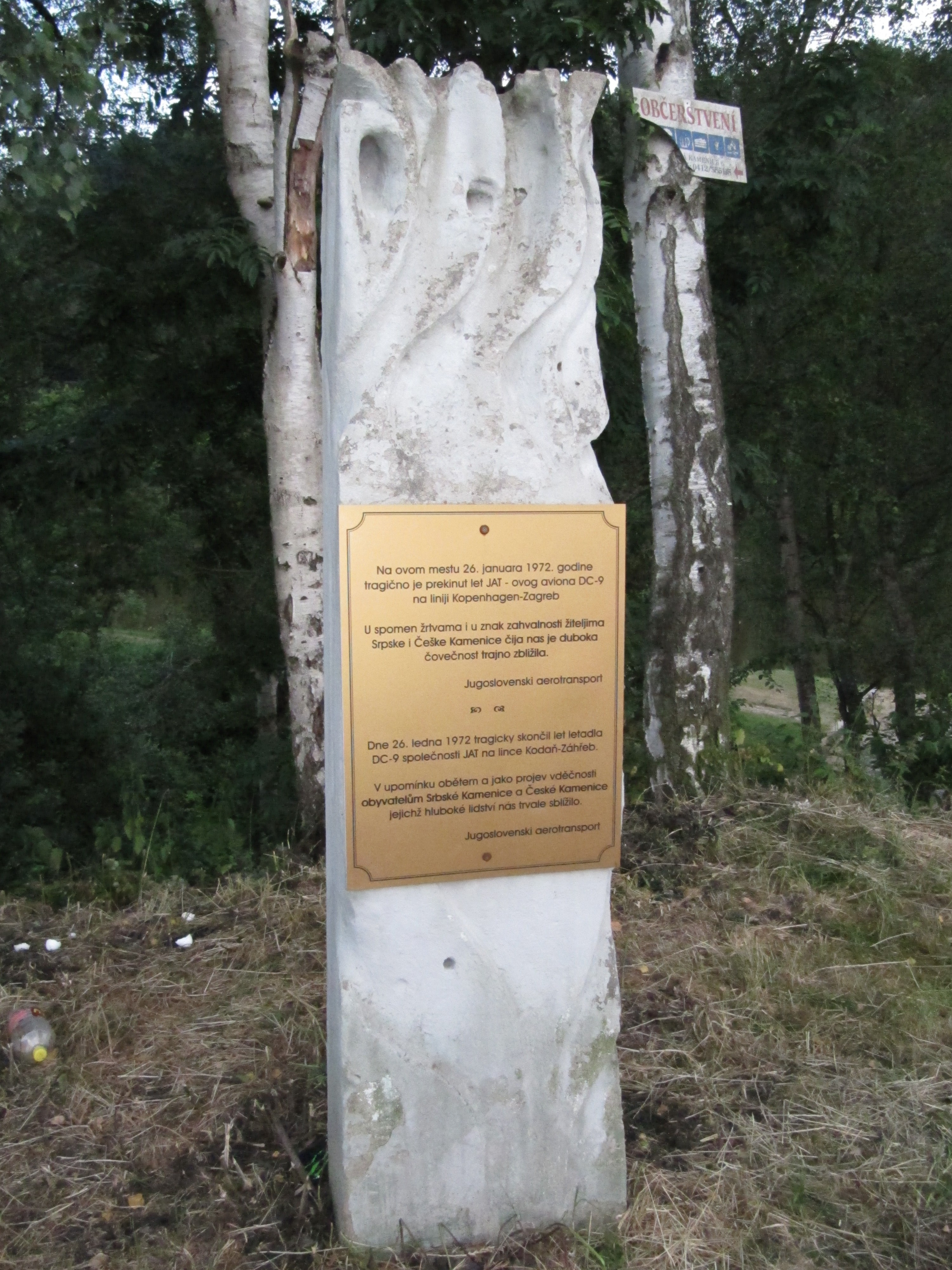
Monument in Srbská Kamenice commemorating the crash

In September 1972, Vulović expressed willingness to resume working as a flight attendant. JAT felt that her presence on flights would attract too much publicity and instead gave her a desk job negotiating freight contracts. In Yugoslavia, she was celebrated as a national hero. Her reputation as a "Cold War heroine" also extended to the Soviet Union and other Warsaw Pact countries. After the crash, Vulović was honoured by Yugoslav President Josip Broz Tito, and the Serbian folk singer Miroslav Ilić recorded a song titled "Vesna stjuardesa" ("Vesna the Stewardess"). She was soon made an honorary citizen of Srbská Kamenice. Honke, the man who found Vulović alive after the crash, had a granddaughter born six weeks after her fall; she was named Vesna in Vulović's honour. Vulović continued to fly regularly, stating that other passengers were surprised to see her on flights and wanted to sit next to her.

Vulović's parents both died within a few years of the crash. In 1977, (Note: A 2005 newspaper article published by the Croatian daily Večernji list reports that Vulović married in 1975. In an interview with Aviation Security Magazine, Vulović stated that she was married in 1977.) she married mechanical engineer Nikola Breka after a year of dating. Although she was advised by physicians that her injuries would not have an adverse effect on her reproductive function, Vulović experienced an ectopic pregnancy that nearly proved fatal and was never able to have children. In 1985, The Guinness Book of World Records recognized Vulović as the world record holder for surviving the highest fall without a parachute: 10,160 metres (33,330 ft; 6.31 mi). She was thus officially acknowledged as having surpassed the records of other fall survivors, such as Alan Magee, Juliane Koepcke, Nicholas Alkemade, and Ivan Chisov. She received the recognition at a London gala from musician Paul McCartney.

In the early 1990s, Vulović and her husband divorced. (Note: According to Večernji list, the couple divorced in the mid-1980s. In 2002, Vulović told Aviation Security Magazine that she and her husband divorced "ten years ago".) She attributed the divorce to her chain smoking, which her husband disapproved of. Around the same time, (Note: Some sources suggest that Vulović's employment was terminated in 1990. According to Večernji list, JAT terminated her employment in 1991.) Vulović was reported to have been terminated by JAT for speaking out against Serbian statesman Slobodan Milošević and taking part in anti-government protests. By her own account, however, she had her salary reduced, was demoted and was sent into retirement with a poor pension. She avoided arrest because the government was concerned about the negative publicity that her imprisonment would bring. In response to her activism, pro-Milošević tabloids launched a smear campaign against her, claiming that Flight 367 had been shot down by a Czechoslovak surface-to-air missile and that she had fallen from a lesser height than previously believed. Vulović continued taking part in anti-government demonstrations throughout the 1990s. When Milošević and his Socialist Party of Serbia were ousted in the Bulldozer Revolution of October 2000, Vulović was among several celebrities who took to the balcony of Belgrade's city hall to make victory addresses. She later campaigned on behalf of the Democratic Party and advocated for Serbia's entry into the European Union, which she believed would bring economic prosperity.

== Later life and death ==
Vulović told reporters that she did not think of her fall every day, but admitted to struggling with survivor's guilt. "Whenever I think of the accident, I have a prevailing, grave feeling of guilt for surviving it and I cry ... Then I think maybe I should not have survived at all." Vulović declined therapy to help cope with her experiences and instead turned to religion, becoming a devout Orthodox Christian. She stated that her ordeal had turned her into an optimist. "If you can survive what I survived," she said, "you can survive anything."

In 2009, Peter Hornung and Pavel Theiner, two Prague-based journalists, claimed that Flight 367 had been mistaken for an enemy aircraft and shot down by the Czechoslovak Air Force at an altitude of 800 metres (2,600 ft), far lower than the official altitude of 10,160 metres (33,330 ft). The two claimed that the Czechoslovak State Security had conjured up Vulović's record fall as part of a cover-up. They also hypothesized that the call received by Kvällsposten, claiming responsibility for the aircraft's downing, was a hoax. The Czech Civil Aviation Authority dismissed the journalists' claim, calling it a conspiracy theory. Hornung conceded that the pair's evidence was only circumstantial. Vulović said that she was aware of the journalists' claims, but stated that because she had no memory of the event, she could not confirm or deny the allegations. Guinness World Records continues to list her as the record-holder for surviving the highest fall without a parachute.

In the last years of her life, Vulović lived on a pension of €300 per month in her Belgrade apartment. "I don't know what to say when people say I was lucky," she remarked. "Life is so hard today." Vulović lamented that her mother and father might not have died prematurely had she not been aboard Flight 367, stating that the incident not only ruined her life but also those of her parents. She only occasionally granted interviews and declined numerous requests, most notably from Oprah Winfrey and the BBC, saying that she was "tired" of discussing her fall. By the time she had reached her sixties, Vulović's deteriorating health prevented her from taking part in annual commemorations at Srbská Kamenice, which she had previously attended for many years.

In December 2016, Vulović's friends became concerned for her well-being after she abruptly stopped answering telephone calls. On 23 December, locksmiths discovered her body in her apartment after forcing open the door. She was reported to have died the same day. Vulović's friends said that she had struggled with heart ailments in the years leading up to her death. She was buried in Belgrade's New Cemetery on 27 December.

== See also ==
- Free fall
- List of sole survivors of aviation accidents and incidents
- Ewa Wiśnierska
- William Rankin
