= Tête de Balme =

Mountain in Switzerland

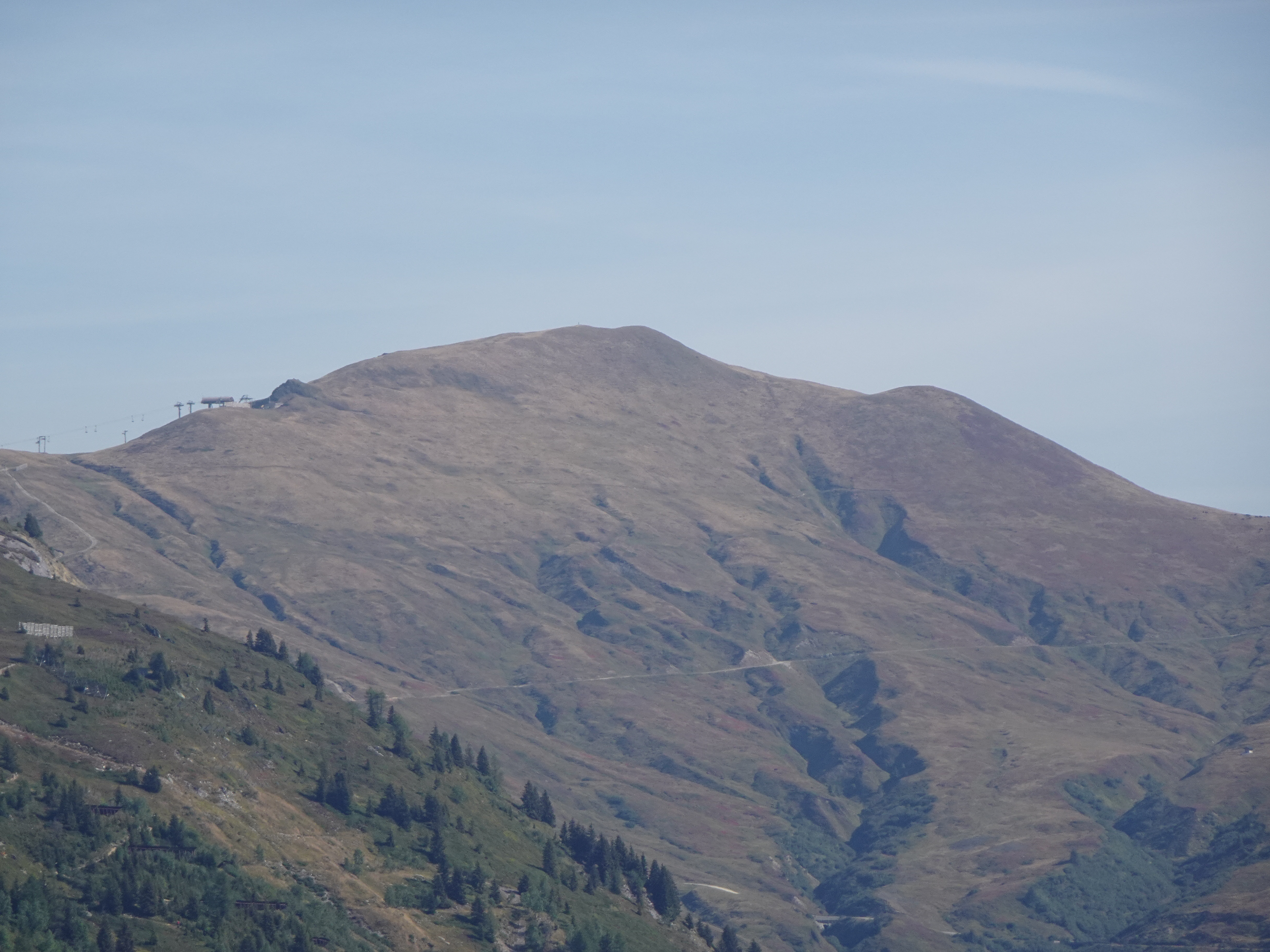

Highest point
- Elevation: 2,321 m (7,615 ft)
- Prominence: 32 m (105 ft)
- Parent peak: L'Arolette
- Coordinates: 46°01′52″N 6°57′59.5″E

Geography
- Location within Alps
- Location: Valais, Switzerland; Haute-Savoie, France
- Parent range: Mont Blanc Massif

The Tête de Balme (2,321 m) is a mountain of the Mont Blanc Massif, located on the border between Switzerland and France. It lies on the range north of the Col de Balme, culminating at the Croix de Fer.
