= Saint-Nazaire station =

Railway station in France

Coordinates: 47°17′12″N 2°12′42″W

Saint-Nazaire
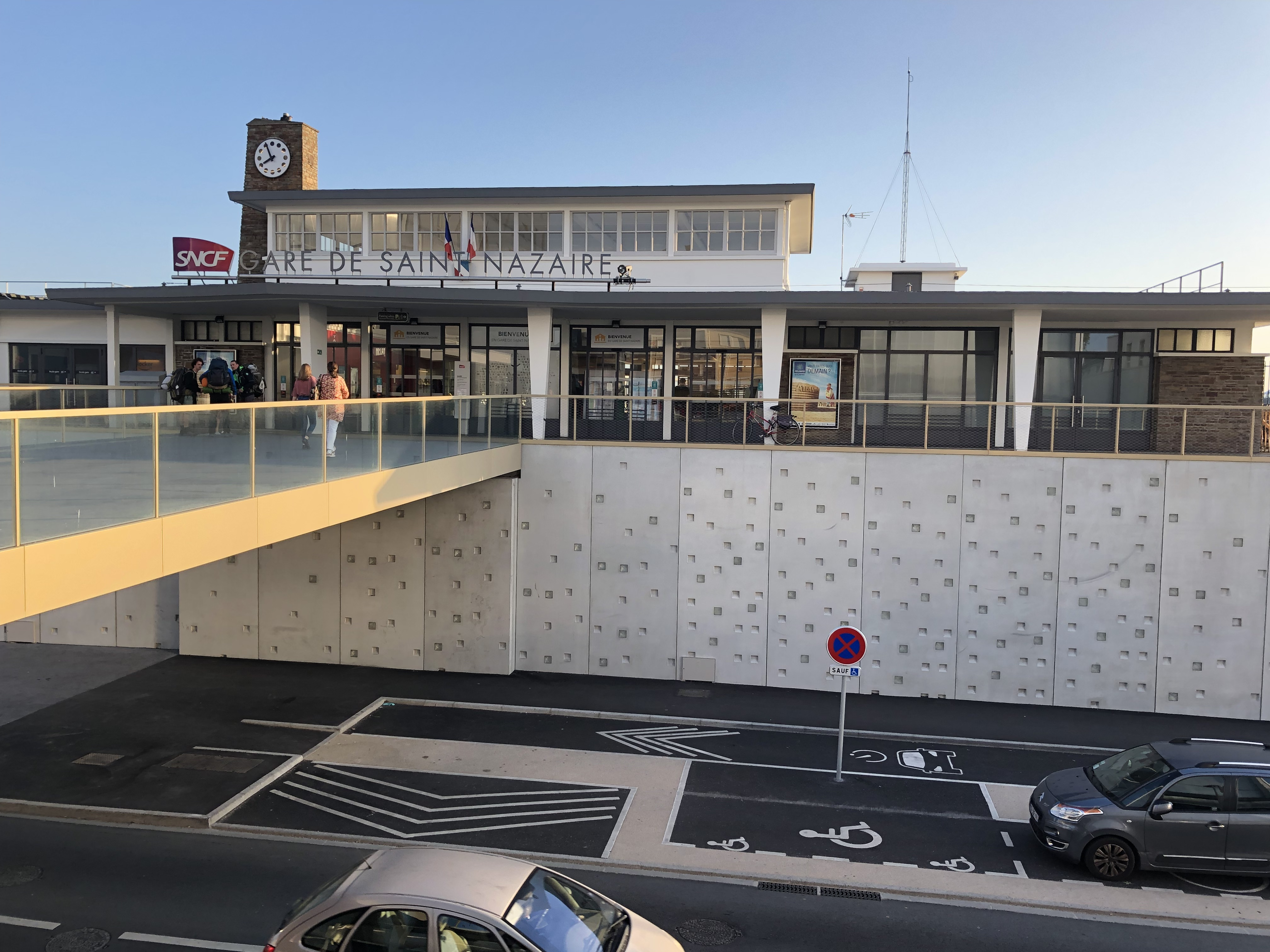

General information
- Location: Saint-Nazaire; France
- Elevation: 4 m (13 ft)
- Owner: RFF / SNCF
- Operator: SNCF
- Lines: TGV Atlantique; TER Pays de la Loire; Interloire
- Platforms: 3
- Tracks: 4

Construction
- Platform levels: 2

Other information
- Station code: 87481705

History
- Opened: 1995
- Electrified: 25 kV AC

Passengers
- 2024: 1,371,500

Services
Preceding station	SNCF	Following station
Nantes towards Montparnasse	TGV	Pornichet towards Le Croisic
Preceding station	TER Pays de la Loire	Following station
Pornichet towards Le Croisic	1	Penhoët towards Nantes
Location

The Gare de Saint-Nazaire is the passenger railway station serving the French town and port of Saint-Nazaire.

Designed by Noël Le Maresquier with a functional and maritime style, it was built in 1955 in anticipation of the arrival of the TGV Atlantique and replaced an older station in the town developed in the 19th century by the Chemin de Fer de Paris à Orléans railway. Located to the north of the town, to make access easier there is a bridge linking the station to the main town centre.

Its design has come in for some local criticism in 2008, as well as its state of upkeep. SNCF have promised various levels of maintenance and development, particularly to assist disabled passengers and make a better impression on visitors to the town. Access to the station by foot or car is currently difficult, due to associated and local redevelopment.

The shell of the old station, now a performing arts theatre, is located further south, adjacent to the Port of Saint Nazaire. It is also noted for being the site of one of the most incredible survival stories of WW2. On January 3, 1943, US Airman Alan Magee fell from his crippled B-17, without a parachute, from a height 20,000 feet. He crashed through the glass ceiling of the train station, which slowed his fall enough to allow him to survive upon hitting the floor below.

== Services ==
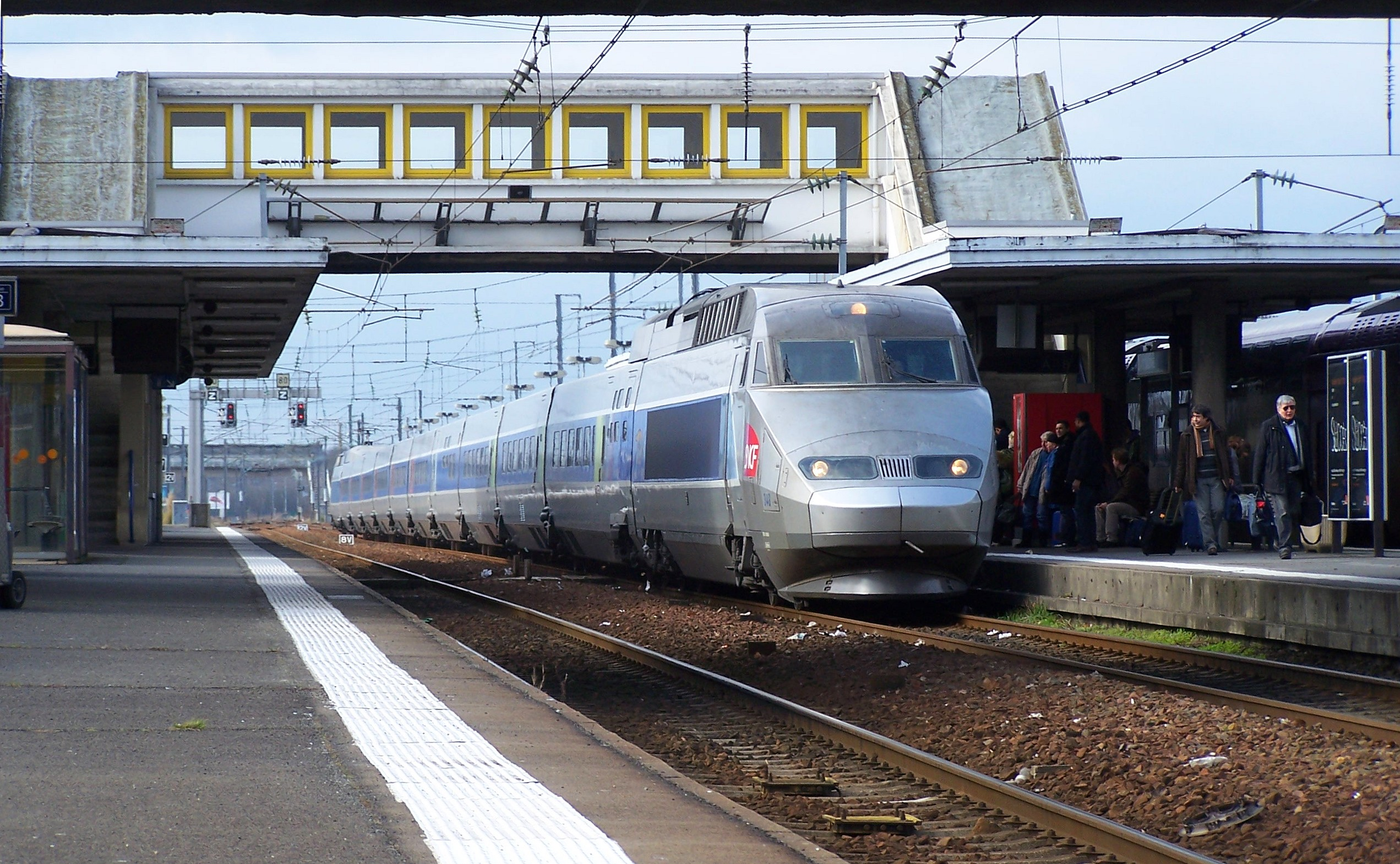
A TGV train at the station in 2004.

The station is served by both the TGV and the regional trains and buses of the TER Pays de la Loire. The TGV (high speed train) provides connection to Paris, Lyon, Marseille, Lille, and Strasbourg; with trains to Paris via the LGV Atlantique taking just over 2 hours. TER Pays de la Loire and Interloire provide links to Nantes, Angers, Le Mans, La Roche sur Yon, and many other regional cities and towns.

== See also ==
- Tours–Saint-Nazaire railway
- Alan Magee
