= Col de Balme =

High mountain pass of the Alps

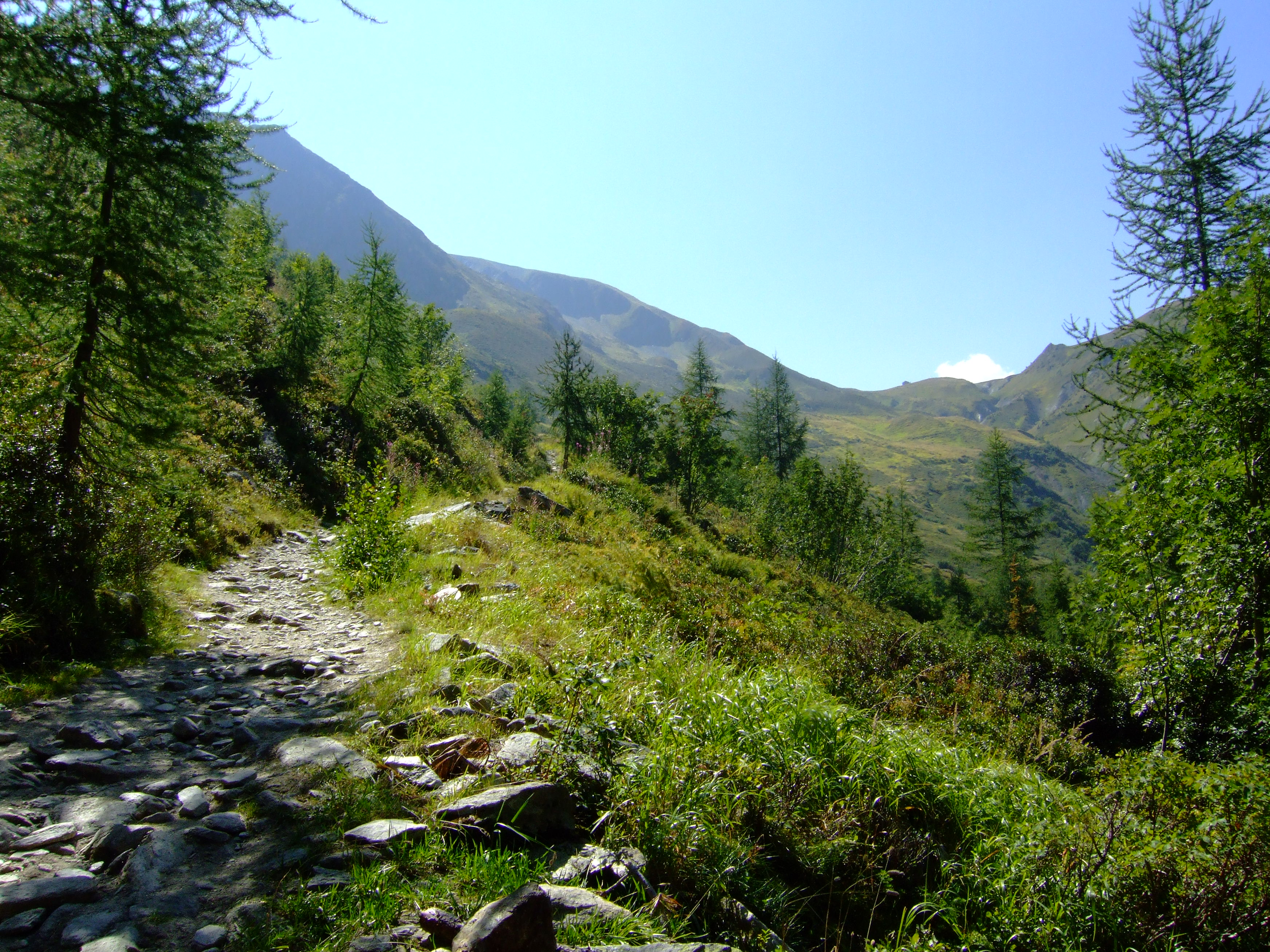
- View from the north side

- Location within Alps
- Elevation: 2,195 metres (7,201 ft)
- Traversed by: Trail

Third Approach
- Location: Valais, Switzerland; Haute-Savoie, France
- Range: Mont Blanc massif
- Coordinates: 46°01′39″N 06°58′11″E

The Col de Balme (2,195 m) is a high mountain pass of the Alps, located on the border between Switzerland and France. It connects Trient in the Swiss canton of Valais to Argentière in the French department of Haute-Savoie. The pass lies between the summits of Tête de Balme and Les Grandes Otanes.

The Col de Balme lies on the Tour du Mont Blanc walk. A restaurant is located above the summit of the pass.
