= Intoxication =

Intoxication — or poisoning, especially by an alcoholic or narcotic substance — may refer to:

- Substance intoxication:
  - Alcohol intoxication
  - LSD intoxication
  - Toxidrome
  - Tobacco intoxication
  - Cannabis intoxication
  - Cocaine intoxication
  - Caffeine § Caffeine intoxication
  - Stimulant § Effects
  - Water intoxication
  - Drug overdose
  - Inhalant abuse § Administration and effects
- Intoxication (film), a 1919 German film directed by Ernst Lubitsch
- Intoxication (Shaggy album)
- Intoxication (The Habibis album), 1998
- "Intoxication", a song by Disturbed from Believe
- "Intoxication", a single by Shriekback from their Go Bang! album

== See also ==
- Intoxicated (disambiguation)
