= Les Grandes Otanes =

Mountain in Switzerland

- Location within Alps

Highest point
- Elevation: 2,680 m (8,790 ft)
- Prominence: 23 m (75 ft)
- Coordinates: 46°01′10″N 06°58′53″E

Geography
- Location: Valais, Switzerland; Haute-Savoie, France
- Parent range: Mont Blanc Massif

Les Grandes Otanes is a mountain of the Mont Blanc Massif, located on the border between Switzerland and France, north of the Aiguille du Tour. They overlook the Col de Balme.
