= Ivan Chisov =

Soviet Air Force airman (1916–1986)

- Born: 1916; Bogdanovka, Poltava Raion, Russian Empire
- Died: 1986 (aged 69–70); Moscow, Soviet Union
- Military career
- Allegiance: Soviet Union
- Branch: Soviet Air Force
- Service years: 1941–1960
- Rank: Podpolkovnik
- Unit: 98th Long-range Aviation Regiment
- Conflicts: Second World War
- Awards: Order of the Red Banner

Ivan Mikhailovich Chisov (Russian: Иван Михайлович Чиcсов, Ukrainian: Іван Михайлович Чиссов; 1916–1986) was a Soviet Air Force lieutenant who survived a fall of approximately 7,000 meters (23,000 feet).

== Biography ==
Lieutenant Colonel Chisov was a navigator on a Soviet Air Force Ilyushin Il-4 bomber. On 21 January 1942, Luftwaffe fighters attacked his bomber, forcing him to bail out. Nikolai Zhugan, a crewman on Chisov's flight, later said that Chisov leapt from the plane at an altitude of approximately 7,000 meters (23,000 feet), though other references list Chisov's fall at 6,700 meters. Zhugan himself waited until the plane was at about 5,000 meters before bailing out.

With the air battle still raging around him, Chisov intentionally did not open his parachute, as he feared that doing so would make him an easy target for German gunfire while dangling from his parachute harness. He planned to drop below the level of the battle and open his chute once he was out of sight of the fighters. Due to the thin atmosphere at that altitude, however, he lost consciousness and was unable to pull the rip cord.

Chisov struck the edge of a snowy ravine at an estimated speed of between 190 and 240 km/h (120 and 150 mph), then slid, rolled, and ploughed his way to the bottom. The aerial battle had been seen by cavalry commander General Pavel Alexeyevich Belov. When Chisov was seen falling to the ground, cavalrymen rushed to the site, and were surprised to find Chisov alive, still wearing his unopened parachute. Chisov regained consciousness a short time later.

Chisov suffered severe injuries, including spinal injuries and a broken pelvis. He was immediately operated on and was in critical condition for a month following. Despite his injuries, he was able to fly again three months later. He requested to continue flying combat missions, but was instead sent to become a navigational trainer.

Chisov flew over 70 combat missions during the course of his career.

After the war, he graduated from the Military-Political Academy. On his departure from the reserve, he became a propagandist for the Central House of the Soviet Army.

== Awards ==
- Order of the Red Banner (23.07.1943)
- Order of the Patriotic War 1st class (1985)
- Medal "For the Defence of Moscow"
- Medal "For the Defence of Leningrad"
- Medal "For the Victory over Germany in the Great Patriotic War 1941–1945"
- Jubilee Medal "Twenty Years of Victory in the Great Patriotic War 1941–1945"
- Jubilee Medal "Thirty Years of Victory in the Great Patriotic War 1941–1945"
- Jubilee Medal "Forty Years of Victory in the Great Patriotic War 1941–1945"

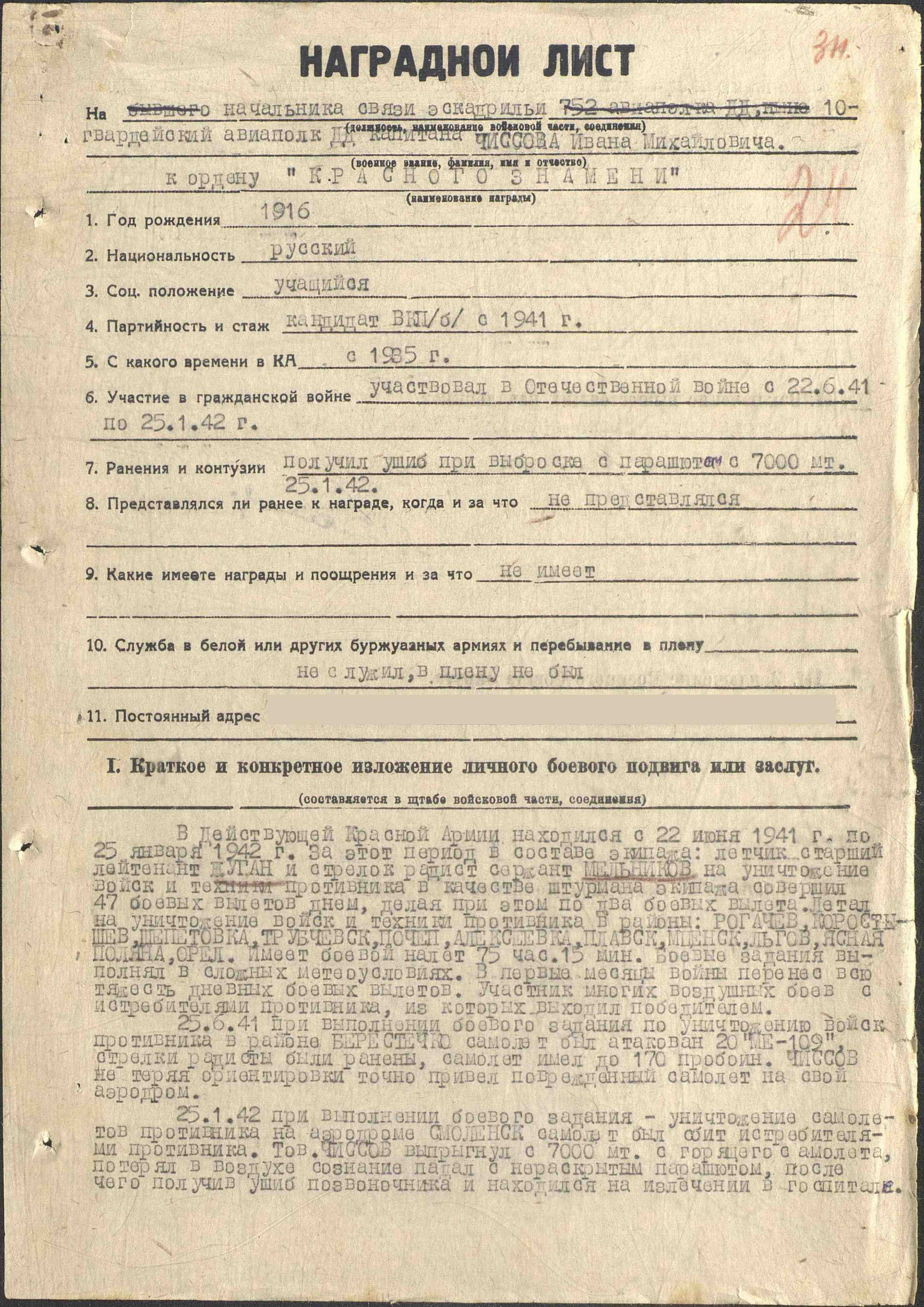
Order of the Red Banner citation.

== See also ==
Fall survivors

- Nicholas Alkemade, British bomber tailgunner who survived falling from his burning Avro Lancaster B Mk. II in 1944
- Juliane Koepcke, who survived a 3 kilometre fall after her Lockheed Electra flight broke up over the Peruvian Amazon in 1971
- Alan Magee, American, World War II airman who survived a 22,000-foot (6,700 m) fall from his damaged B-17F Flying Fortress in 1943
- Vesna Vulović, Serbian flight attendant who survived the mid-air breakup of her McDonnell Douglas DC-9 in 1972

Other

- List of aviation accidents and incidents with a sole survivor
