= Nicholas Alkemade =

Royal Air Force airman (1922–1987)

Nicholas Stephen Alkemade (20 December 1922 – 22 June 1987) was a British tail gunner in the Royal Air Force during the Second World War who survived a freefall of 18,000 feet (5,490 m) without a parachute after abandoning his out-of-control, burning Avro Lancaster heavy bomber over Germany.

== War service ==
On the night of 24 March 1944, 21-year-old Flight Sergeant Alkemade was one of seven crew members in Avro Lancaster B Mk. II, DS664, of No. 115 Squadron RAF flying from RAF Witchford. Returning from a 300-bomber raid on Berlin, east of Schmallenberg, DS664 was attacked by a German Junkers Ju 88 night-fighter flown by Oberleutnant Heinz Rökker of Nachtjagdgeschwader 2. The attack caused the Lancaster to catch fire and began to spiral out of control.

Alkemade was not wearing a parachute as there was no room in the turret, so he climbed towards the middle of the plane to get a parachute, but was initially beaten back by the flames.

His parachute eventually caught fire and was unserviceable, so Alkemade jumped from the aircraft without it, preferring to die on impact rather than burn to death. He fell 18,000 feet (5,490 m) to the ground. His fall was broken by fir trees and a soft snow cover on the ground. He was able to move his arms and legs and suffered only a sprained leg. The Lancaster crashed, bursting into flames and killing pilot Jack Newman, engineer Edgar Warren, bomb-aimer Charles Hilder, and mid-upper gunner John McDonough. They are buried in the Hanover War Cemetery. In 1998, Joe Cleary, a survivor of Newman's crew, met with Rökker and they visited the Lancaster's crash site near Oberkirchen.

Alkemade was subsequently captured and interviewed by the Gestapo, who were initially suspicious of his claim to have fallen without a parachute. This was until the wreckage of the aircraft was examined and his parachute was found as Alkemade had described it. The Germans gave Alkemade a certificate testifying to the fact. He was a celebrated prisoner of war, held in Stalag Luft I, before being repatriated in May 1945.

== Later life ==
Alkemade worked in the chemical industry after the war. He appeared on the ITV series Just Amazing!, a programme in which former motorcycle champion Barry Sheene interviewed people who had, through accident or design, achieved feats of daring and survival. He also appeared with Tom O'Connor on I've Got A Secret on BBC One, 5 December 1984.

Alkemade died on 22 June 1987 in Liskeard, Cornwall, aged 64.

In January 2020, 115 Squadron at RAF Wittering voted to rename a building as "The Alkemade Building" in honour of his achievements in the RAF.

== See also ==
Fall survivors

- Ivan Chisov, Soviet airforce lieutenant who survived falling from his aircraft in 1942
- Juliane Koepcke, German teenager who survived a 3,000-metre (9,800 ft) fall after her flight broke up over the Peruvian Amazon in 1971
- Alan Magee, American airman who survived a 22,000-foot (6,700 m) fall from his damaged B-17 in 1943
- Vesna Vulović, Serbian flight attendant who survived the 10,000-metre (33,000 ft) mid-air breakup of her aircraft in 1972

Other

- List of aviation accidents and incidents with a sole survivor
