= Alan Magee =

United States Army Air Forces airman

Alan Eugene Magee
- Born: January 13, 1919; Plainfield, New Jersey
- Died: December 20, 2003 (aged 84); San Angelo, Texas
- Military career
- Allegiance: USA
- Branch: USAAF
- Service years: 1941–1945
- Rank: Staff sergeant
- Units: 303rd Bomb Group, Eighth Air Force
- Conflicts: World War II
- Awards: Air Medal; Purple Heart

Alan Eugene Magee (January 13, 1919 – December 20, 2003) was a United States airman during World War II who survived a 22,000-foot (6,700-meter) fall from his damaged B-17F Flying Fortress. He was featured in the 1981 Smithsonian magazine as one of the 10 most amazing survival stories of World War II.

== Military career and fall ==
Immediately after the Japanese attack on Pearl Harbor, Magee joined the United States Army Air Forces and was assigned as a ball turret gunner on a B-17F bomber.

On January 3, 1943, his Flying Fortress—B-17F-27-BO, 41-24620, nicknamed Snap! Crackle! Pop!—part of the 360th Bombardment Squadron, 303rd Bomb Group, was on a daylight bombing run over Saint-Nazaire, France. It was Magee's seventh mission.

Magee left his ball turret when it became inoperative after German flak damaged it and discovered his parachute had been torn and rendered useless. Another flak hit then blew off a section of the right wing, causing the aircraft to enter a deadly spin. Magee, in the process of moving from the bomb bay to the radio room, blacked out from lack of oxygen because of the high altitude and was thrown clear of the aircraft. He fell over 4 miles (6.4 km), reaching a speed of approximately 120 mph (190 km/h) before crashing through the glass roof of the Saint-Nazaire railroad station. The glass roof shattered, mitigating the force of Magee's final impact. Rescuers found him on the floor of the station.

Magee was taken as a prisoner of war and given medical treatment by his captors. He had 28 shrapnel wounds in addition to his injuries from the fall: several broken bones, severe damage to his nose and eye, lung and kidney damage, and a nearly severed right arm.

Magee was liberated at the end of the war in Europe in May 1945 and received the Air Medal for meritorious conduct and the Purple Heart. On January 3, 1993, the 50th anniversary of the attack, the people of St. Nazaire honored Magee and the crew of his bomber by erecting a 6-foot-tall (1.8 m) memorial to them.

== Personal life ==
Magee was born in Plainfield, New Jersey, as the youngest of six children.

After World War II, Magee earned his pilot's license and worked in the airline industry in a variety of roles. He retired in 1979 and moved to northern New Mexico. He died in San Angelo, Texas, on December 20, 2003, from a stroke and kidney failure at the age of 84.

== See also ==
Fall survivors

- Nicholas Alkemade, British Avro Lancaster B Mk. II crewman who survived falling from his burning aircraft in 1944
- Ivan Chisov, Soviet Air Force lieutenant who survived falling from his Ilyushin Il-4 bomber in 1942
- Juliane Koepcke, German teenager who survived a 3,000-metre (9,800 ft) fall after her Lockheed Electra flight broke up over the Peruvian Amazon.
- Vesna Vulović, Serbian flight attendant who survived a 10,160-metre (33,330 ft) fall after the mid-air bombing of her McDonnell Douglas DC-9 in 1972; holds the world record for surviving the highest fall without a parachute

Other

- List of aviation accidents and incidents with a sole survivor
