= Luke Aikins =

American stunt performer and skydiver (born 1973)

- Born: November 21, 1973 (age 52); Corpus Christi, Texas, U.S.
- Occupations: Skydiver, pilot, stuntman, photographer
- Years active: 1985–present
- Known for: First person to intentionally skydive and land without a parachute or a wingsuit and survive
- Spouse: Monica Lee Aikins
- Children: Logan (son)

Luke Aikins (born November 21, 1973) is an American professional skydiver, BASE jumper, pilot, and aerial photographer. He is the first person to intentionally dive from mid-tropospheric altitude and land safely without a parachute or a wingsuit and the second skydiver to intentionally jump and safely land without using a parachute.

Aikins is affiliated with Red Bull.

== Sky diving ==
Aikins has coached United States Navy SEALs and NASCAR's Brian Vickers, and has advised the military on skydiving techniques. He is also a safety and training advisor for the United States Parachute Association. He is also an aerial photographer and his photos have been published in major magazines and newspapers. He has completed more than 18,000 jumps since he started skydiving at age 12.

In 2012, he helped skydiver Felix Baumgartner jump from a helium balloon in the stratosphere at 120,000 feet (36,576 m). Aikins also worked on stunts in the film Iron Man 3.

In 2020, he helped David Blaine with his Ascension stunt.

=== July 2016 jump ===
External videos
- Heaven Sent Stride Gum Presents Heaven Sent: A Mad Intense Jump
- Local news interview Luke Aikins 25,000-Foot Freefall

On July 30, 2016, Aikins jumped from an aircraft without any parachute or wingsuit at an altitude of 25,000 feet (7,620 m) above Simi Valley, California, watched by a live audience. After about two minutes of free fall he successfully landed in a 100-by-100-foot (30 by 30 m) net just outside of Simi Valley, California. Aikins reached a terminal velocity of 120 miles per hour (193 km/h) during the fall. The net was made from Spectra, a high-density polyethylene cord. It had four compressed air cylinders designed to gently slow him down after impact. The first skydiver to intentionally jump and land without using a parachute was Gary Connery in 2012 who wore a wingsuit to aid his landing.

Others have jumped out of an aircraft and returned to the same or another aircraft without making use of a parachute.

== Red Bull plane-swap stunt crash ==
On April 24, 2022, during the highly publicized stunt staged as a Hulu On-Demand special event, he and his cousin Andy Farrington attempted and failed to swap planes mid air, resulting in the total loss of one plane.

Aikins and Farrington had been denied permission to undertake the stunt by the Federal Aviation Administration (FAA), and subsequently had their pilot licenses revoked by the FAA.

Records
Preceded by Gary Connery	Highest jump without a parachute (7.620 km); July 30, 2016 – present	Succeeded by Current record
