= JAT Flight 367 =

1972 aircraft bombing in Czechoslovakia

Coordinates: 50°49′37″N 14°20′47″E

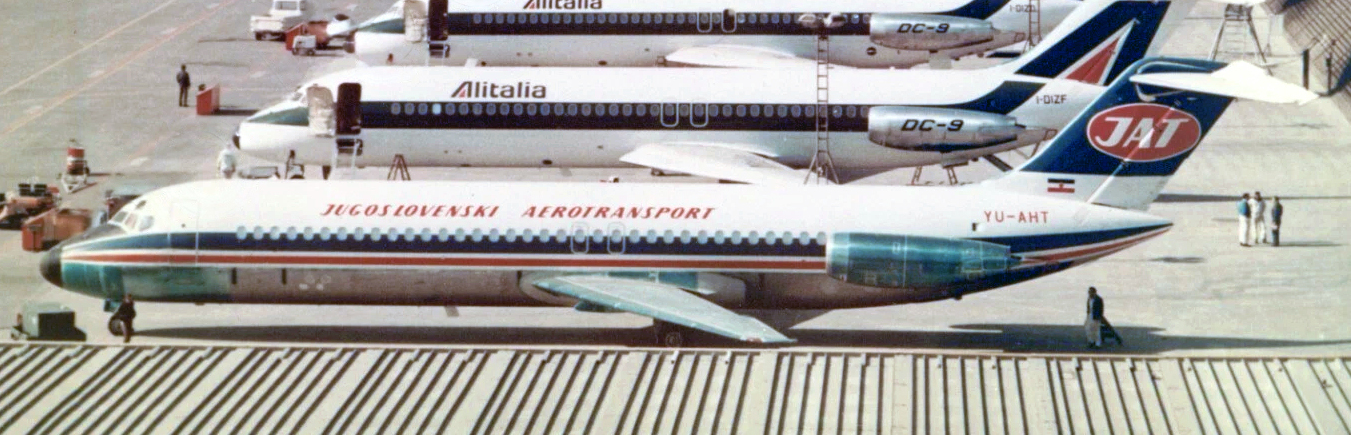
- YU-AHT, the aircraft involved, pictured in 1971

Bombing
- Date: 26 January 1972
- Summary: Bombing
- Site: Srbská Kamenice, Czechoslovakia

Aircraft
- Aircraft type: McDonnell Douglas DC-9-32
- Operator: JAT - Yugoslav Airlines
- IATA flight No.: JU367
- ICAO flight No.: JAT367
- Call sign: JAT 367
- Registration: YU-AHT
- Flight origin: Stockholm-Arlanda Airport; Stockholm, Sweden
- Stopover: Copenhagen Airport; Copenhagen, Denmark
- Last stopover: Zagreb Airport; Zagreb, SFR Yugoslavia (present-day Croatia)
- Destination: Belgrade Airport; Belgrade, SFR Yugoslavia (present-day Serbia)
- Occupants: 28
- Passengers: 23
- Crew: 5
- Fatalities: 27
- Injuries: 1
- Survivors: 1

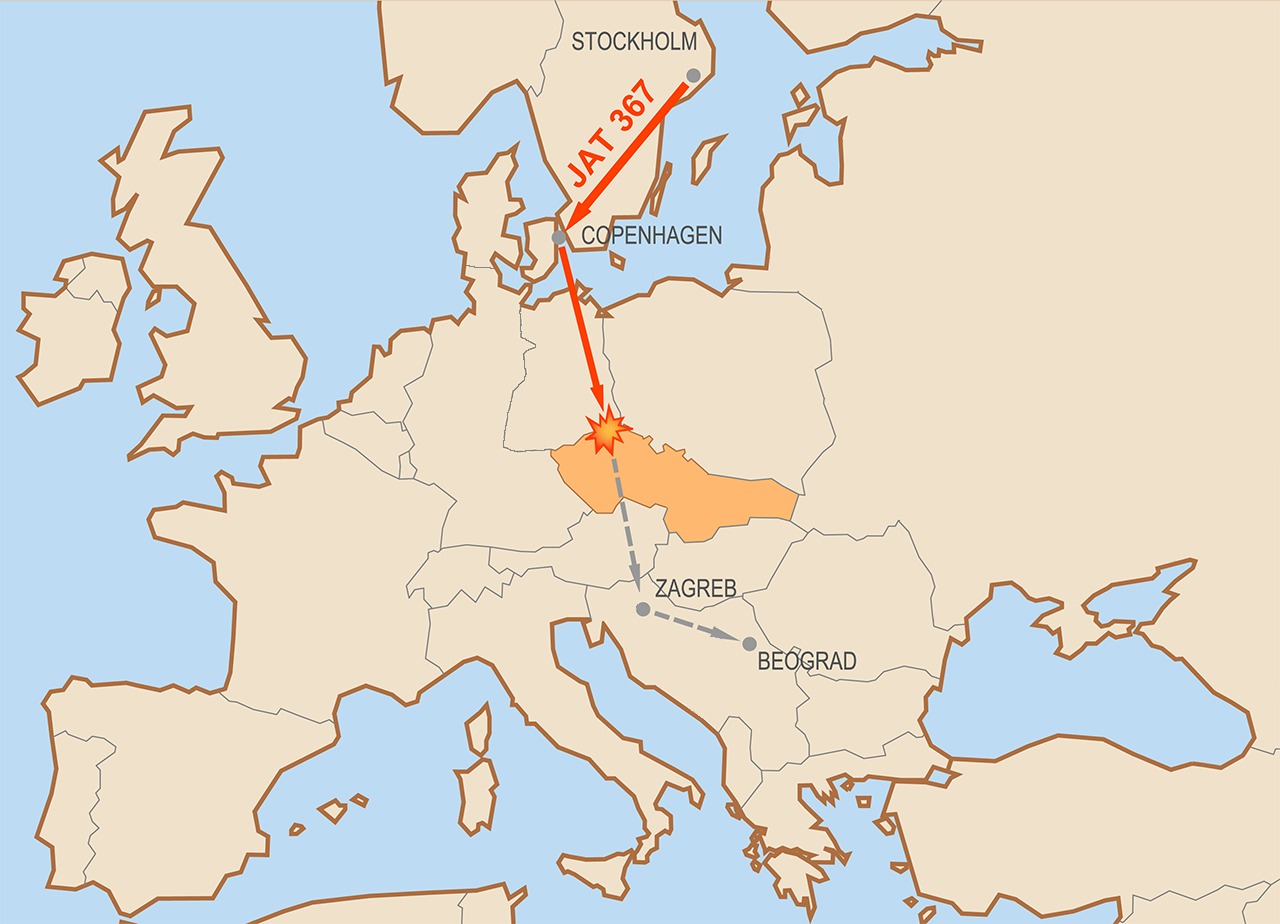
Intended route of Flight 367

JAT Flight 367 was a McDonnell Douglas DC-9-32 aircraft (registration YU-AHT) which exploded shortly after overflying NDB Hermsdorf (located in or around Hinterhermsdorf, in the present-day municipality of Sebnitz), Germany, while en route from Stockholm, Sweden, to Belgrade, SFR Yugoslavia, on 26 January 1972. The aircraft, piloted by Captain Ludvik Razdrih and First Officer Ratko Mihić, broke into three pieces and spun out of control, crashing near the village of Srbská Kamenice in Czechoslovakia (now the Czech Republic). Of the 28 on board, 27 were killed upon ground impact and one Serbian crew member, Vesna Vulović (1950–2016), survived. She holds the Guinness world record for surviving the highest fall without a parachute at 10,160 m (33,330 ft).

== Cause ==
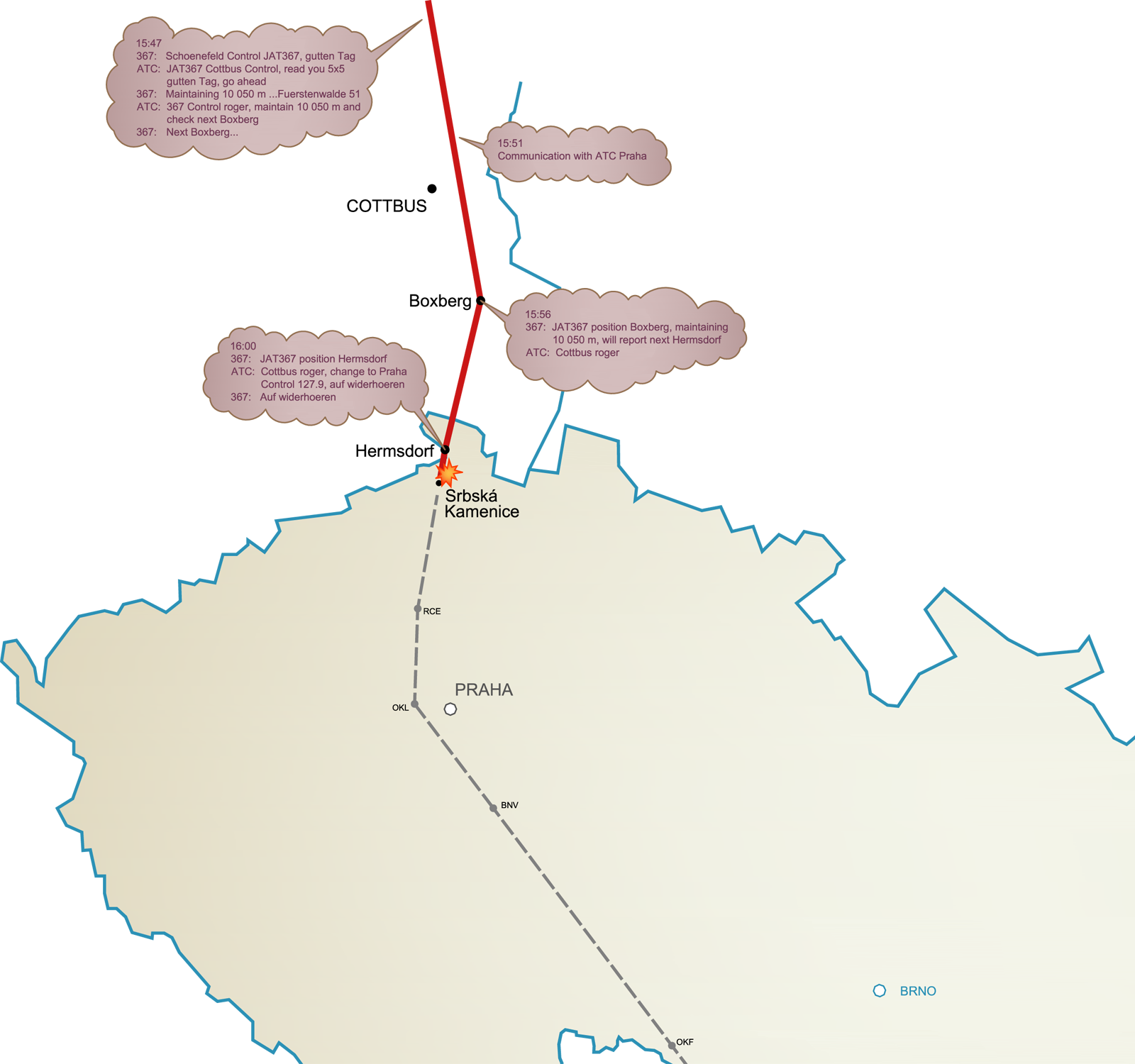
Last 20 minutes of the flight

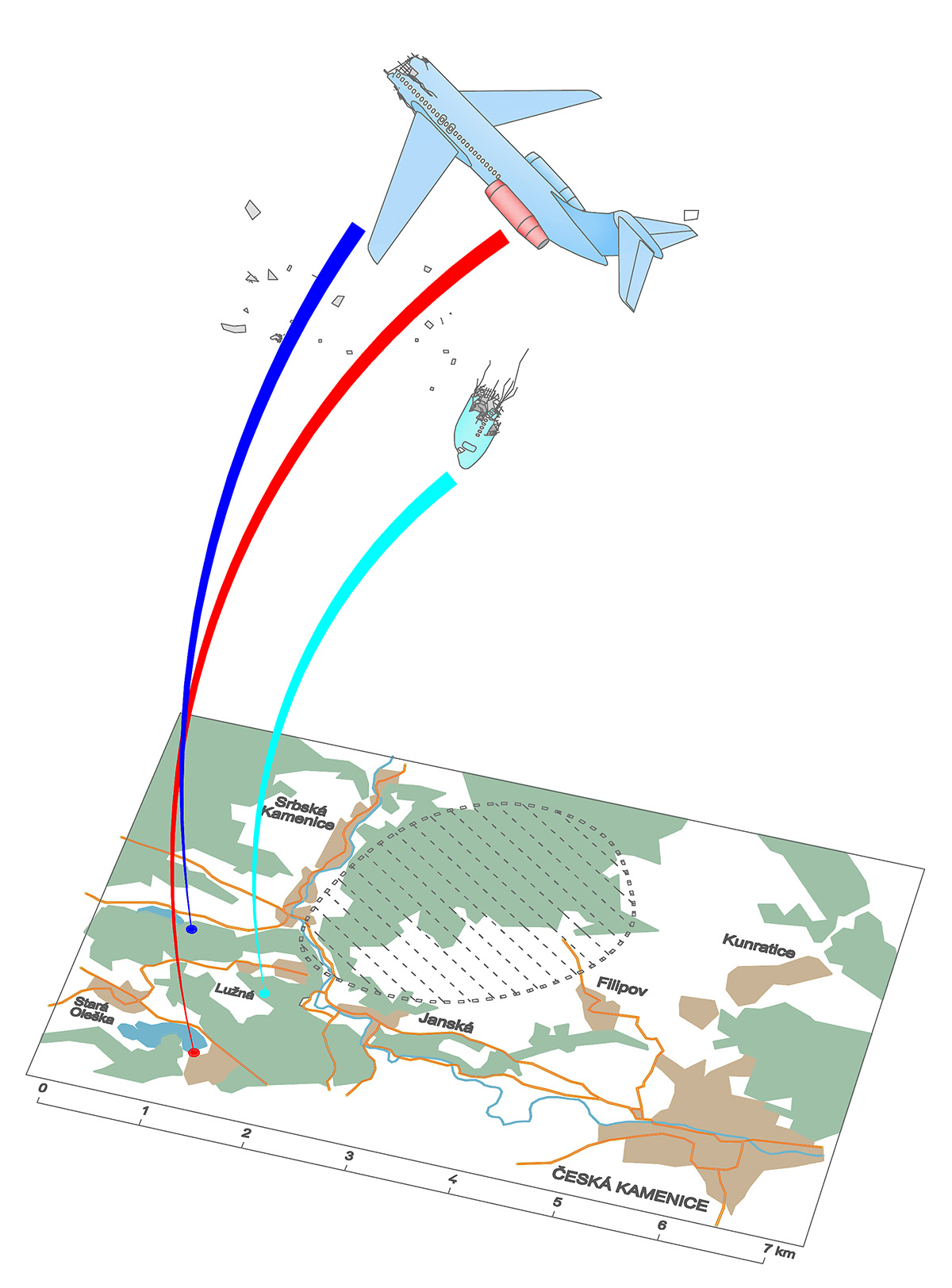
Debris distribution of Flight 367

The secondary crew of JAT Flight 367, flying from Stockholm to Belgrade with stopovers in Copenhagen and Zagreb, arrived in Denmark on the morning of 25 January 1972. Flight 367 departed from Stockholm Arlanda Airport at 1:30 p.m. (13:30 UTC) on 26 January. The aircraft, a McDonnell Douglas DC-9-32, landed at Copenhagen Airport at 2:30 p.m., where it was taken over by Vulović and her colleagues. "As it was late, we were in the terminal and saw it park," Vulović said. "I saw all the passengers and crew deplane. One man seemed terribly annoyed. It was not only me that noticed him either. Other crew members saw him, as did the station manager in Copenhagen. I think it was the man who put the bomb in the baggage. I think he had checked in a bag in Stockholm, got off in Copenhagen and never re-boarded the flight."

Flight 367 departed from Copenhagen Airport at 3:15 p.m. At 4:01 p.m, an explosion tore through the DC-9's baggage compartment. The explosion caused the aircraft to break apart over the Czechoslovak village of Srbská Kamenice. Vulović was the only survivor of the 28 passengers and crew. Some reports stated Vulović was at the rear of the aircraft when the explosion occurred, but she has stated she was told that she was found in the middle section of the plane. She was discovered by villager Bruno Honke, who heard her screaming amid the wreckage. Her turquoise uniform was covered in blood and her 76-millimetre (3 in) stiletto heels had been torn off by the force of the impact. Honke had been a medic during World War II and was able to keep Vulović alive until rescuers arrived. Vulović was in a coma for 27 days and was temporarily paralyzed from the waist down, but survived and eventually regained the ability to walk. She continued working for JAT, holding a desk job.

Between 1962 and 1982, the Ustaše carried out 128 terror attacks against Yugoslavian civilian and military targets. The Yugoslav authorities suspected that émigré Croatian terrorists linked to them brought down Flight 367. On the day of the crash, a bomb exploded aboard a train travelling from Vienna to Zagreb, injuring six. A man, describing himself as a Croatian nationalist, called the Swedish newspaper Kvällsposten the following day and claimed responsibility for the bombing of Flight 367. No arrests have yet been made. The Czechoslovak Civil Aviation Authority later said that a briefcase bomb had been used to blow up the plane.

On 10 October 2024, TV4's investigative program Kalla fakta aired a documentary that found a group of Croat nationalists based in Sweden were implicated in the bombing. Reporter Tonchi Percan discovered names of suspects and found previously classified documents from the Yugoslav security service. The documents contain detailed information about how the crime was planned, financed, and executed. For each one of the seven individuals, the documents contain intelligence from between 38 and 59 different secret agents. The seven men were exiled Croats associated with the Bugojno group who had resided in Sweden and Germany. Kalla fakta interviewed the three Swedish men who were still alive in 2024; two of them denied involvement in the bombing, while the third claimed not to remember anything.

== Shootdown conspiracy theory ==
=== Theory ===
The officially stated cause of the Flight 367 crash was challenged occasionally over the years by conspiracy theories. For example, in 1997 the Czech periodical Letectví a kosmonautika reported that the plane was shot down by mistake by Czechoslovak air defenses.

The discussion about different aspects of the crash was reopened on 8 January 2009, when German news magazine Tagesschau featured a report by investigative journalists Peter Hornung and Pavel Theiner. Allegedly based on newly obtained documents mainly from the Czech Civil Aviation Authority, they concluded that it was "extremely likely" that the plane had been mistakenly shot down only a few hundred meters above the ground by a MiG fighter of the Czechoslovak Air Force, having been mistaken for an enemy aircraft while attempting a forced landing.

As evidence that the DC-9 had broken up at a lower altitude, the journalists cited eyewitnesses from Srbská Kamenice, who had seen the plane burning but still intact below the low-hanging clouds, and confirmation of a Serbian aviation expert (who had been present at the crash site) that the debris area had been much too small for a crash from high altitude; it also referred to sightings of a second plane. According to Hornung, Flight 367 got into difficulties, "went into a steep descent and found itself over a sensitive military area", close to a nuclear weapons facility. However, Hornung himself stated that for his theory "there are only indications, no evidence".

=== Skepticism ===
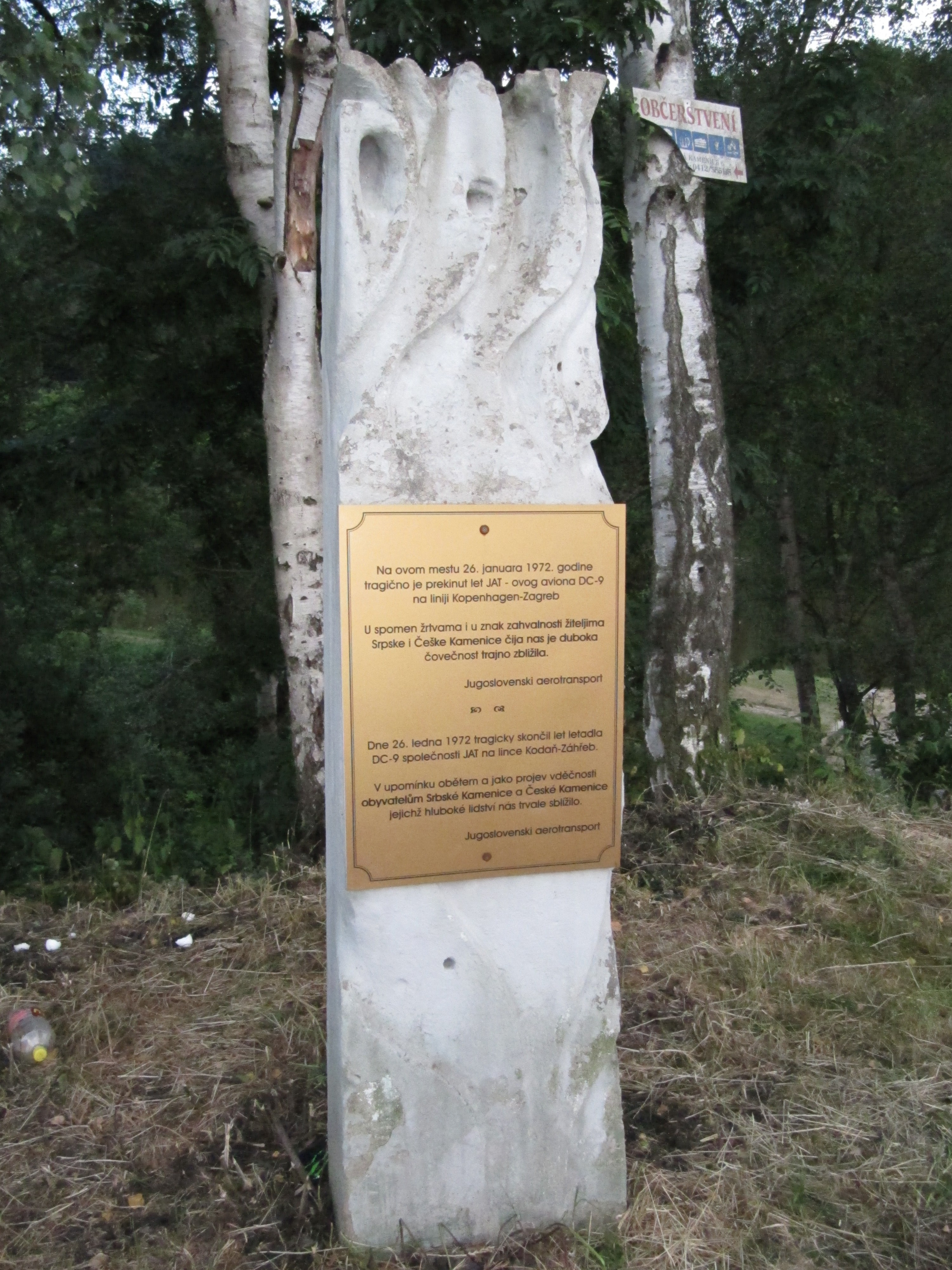
Monument in Srbská Kamenice memoralizing the crash (Czech Republic)

Vulović (who had no memory of the crash or the flight after boarding) referred to the claims that the plane attempted a forced landing or descended to such a low altitude as "nebulous nonsense". A representative of Guinness World Records, according to the German paper Die Tageszeitung, stated that "it seems that at the time Guinness was duped by this swindle just like the rest of the media."

The Civilian Aviation Authority dismissed the conspiracy theory as media speculation, that appears from time to time. Its spokeswoman added that Authority experts would not comment on them and that findings of the official investigation are being questioned mostly because of the media attractiveness of the story.

The Czech magazine Technet quoted a Czech army expert: "In case of violation of the air space, the incident would not be solved by anti-air missiles, but by fighter planes. Also it would not be possible to conceal such incident, as there would be approximately 150–200 people knowing about the incident. They would not have any reason to not tell about the incident today." A potential missile launch would be audible and especially visible for thousands of people long afterwards. He further claims that for the Yugoslav plane, it was technically impossible to dive in a "state of emergency" from the proven flight level to the low altitude and place where it was allegedly shot down. He also states that the debris area wasn't "too small" but that the main parts were more than 1.5 km apart. Additionally, the Czechoslovak Air Defense soldier who operated the radar on the day of the crash stated in a 2009 interview that any Czechoslovak jet fighters would be noticed by West German air defense.

The main evidence against such a theory is the flight data obtained from the black box, which provided the exact data about the time, speed, direction, acceleration and altitude of the plane at the moment of the explosion. Both black boxes were opened and analysed by their respective service companies in Amsterdam in the presence of experts from Czechoslovakia, Yugoslavia, and the Netherlands.

Vulović's fall was the subject of a MythBusters episode, which concluded it was possible to survive the fall depending on how the wreckage someone was sitting in landed.

== Vesna Vulović ==
Vesna Vulović holds the official record in the Guinness Book of Records for the highest fall survived without a parachute. Vesna Vulović received the Guinness prize from Paul McCartney.

A major celebrity in Yugoslavia, Vesna Vulović was a frequent guest on national television shows such as Maksovizija by Milovan Ilić Minimaks up until the 1990s. She attended annual commemorations at the crash site, until they were stopped in 2002. The daughter of the firefighter that saved her bears her name, as well as a local hotel called Pension Vesna in the Czech Republic, near the site of the crash.

== See also ==
- List of accidents and incidents involving airliners by airline
- List of terrorist incidents in 1972
- List of unsolved deaths
- List of aviation accidents and incidents with a sole survivor
- Timeline of airliner bombing attacks
