= List of aviation accidents and incidents with a sole survivor =

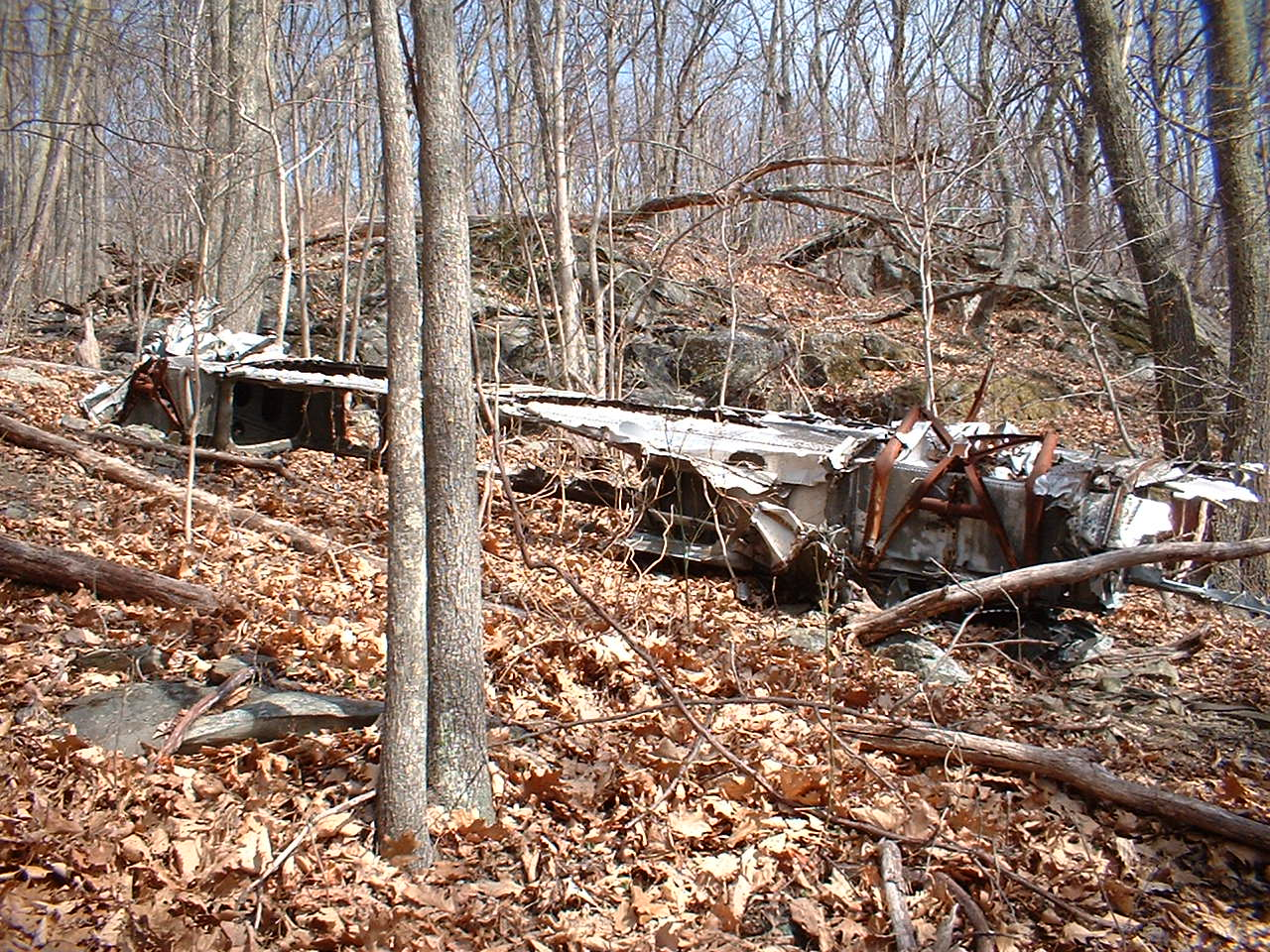
The 1959 crash of Piedmont Airlines Flight 349 near Crozet, Virginia, had 26 fatalities and a sole survivor.

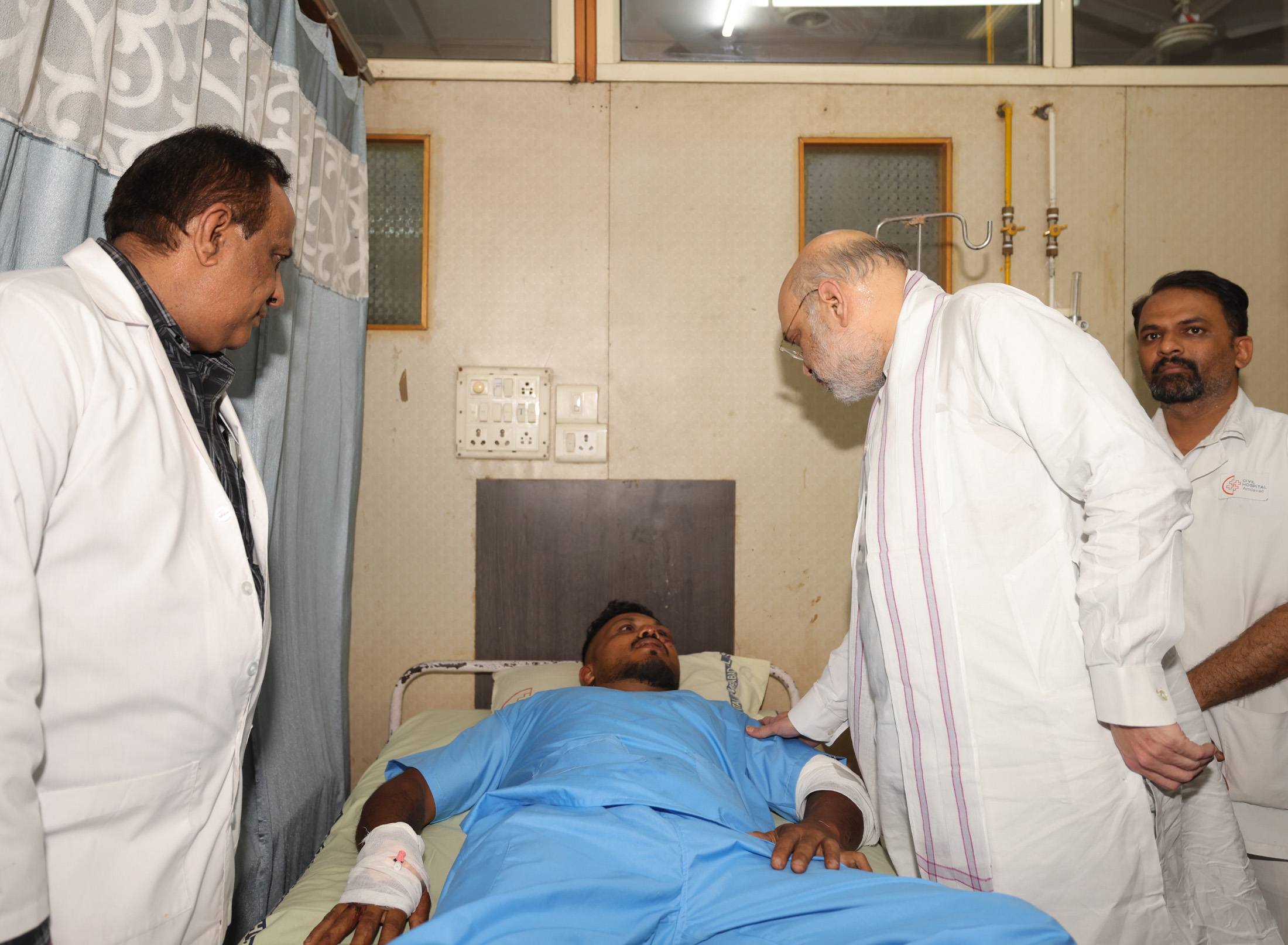
Home minister Amit Shah visits the sole survivor of Air India Flight 171

Presented below is a list of aviation accidents and incidents with a sole survivor, when the event involved 10 or more people on board. Within this list, "sole survivor" refers to a person who survived an air accident in which all other aircraft occupants died as a direct consequence of the accident. Specific criteria are outlined below.

== History ==
The earliest known instance of an incident with 10 or more people on board that had a sole survivor was a New Jersey sightseeing flight on 17 March 1929, which crashed into a sand-filled freight car in an unsuccessful forced landing due to engine failure. The pilot was thrown out on impact and suffered serious injuries; the crash killed all 13 in the cabin and another person in the cockpit.

The most recent aviation accident with a sole survivor is Air India Flight 171, which crashed on 12 June 2025. This accident also has the most fatalities of any sole survivor crash.

== List ==
The below table lists known aviation accidents and incidents with a sole survivor, when such events are consistent with the following criteria:

- The incident involved 10 or more people on board (minimum of 9 occupants in addition to the sole survivor), per official accident reports or other reliably sourced accounts of the incident.
- Excluded are incidents with an initial sole survivor who later died, possibly in another location, due to injuries sustained during the event. (Note: Such incidents, from which an initial sole survivor later succumbed to their injuries, include: 1950 Australian National Airways DC-4 crash; 1961 Ndola Transair Sweden DC-6 crash; Delta Air Lines Flight 723 (1973); Avioimpex Flight 110 (1993))
- When the incident was a collision of two aircraft, on the ground or during flight;
  - Excluded are instances in which there were a combined total of multiple survivors from both aircraft. (Note: Such incidents, in which there was a collision between aircraft and there were multiple survivors in total, include: 2024 Haneda Airport runway collision involving a Japan Coast Guard DHC Dash 8 (1 survivor) and a Japan Airlines Airbus A350 (379 survivors).; 2000 Charles de Gaulle runway collision involving a Streamline Aviation Short 330 (1 survivor) and a Air Liberté MD-83 (157 survivors).)
  - Excluded are instances in which the total of occupants on both aircraft did not meet the criteria of 10 or more people on board. (Note: Collisions where one aircraft has less than 10 occupants, but meets the criteria from the total of occupants on both aircraft, include: Capital Airlines Flight 300 (1958); Hughes Airwest Flight 706 (1971); 1973 Sunnyvale mid-air collision)
  - Excluded are instances in which all occupants of one aircraft died and the sole occupant of the opposing aircraft survived. (Note: Such incidents, in which the sole occupant of the opposing aircraft survived, include: Eastern Air Lines Flight 537 (1949); British European Airways Flight 142 (1958); VASP Flight 233 (1959); All Nippon Airways Flight 58 (1971).)
- Excluded are incidents involving heavy bombers during World War II, which frequently had 10 or more crew members. (Note: Non-combat events during World War II, such as the Dunbeath air crash, a VIP transport mission, are included.)

"Nationality" refers to the country of the sole survivor, and "Age" refers to the age of the sole survivor at the time that the event occurred. In some instances, details about the sole survivor are unknown or were not disclosed.

Date	Operator	Flight / information	Fatalities	Sole survivor (if known)					Notes	Source
Date	Operator	Flight / information	Fatalities	Name	Nationality	Age	M/F	P/C	Notes	Source
1929-03-17	Colonial Western Airlines	Ford Trimotor crash in Newark	14	Lou Foote	United States	34	M	C	Captain of the flight.	
1930-08-22	Czechoslovak Airlines	Ford Trimotor crash in Jihlava	12	Vojtěch Kraus	Czechoslovakia	30	M	P		
1935-12-31	Imperial Airways	Short Calcutta crash on the Nile near Alexandria	12	Vernon Gorry Wilson	United Kingdom	33	M	C	Captain of the flight; died in another plane crash seven years later.	
1936-09-05	Pittsburgh Skyways	Stinson 6000 crash in Pittsburgh	10	Linda McDonald	United States	17	F	P		
1936-09-24	Ala Littoria	CANT Z.506 crash off Benghazi	9				M	C	Radio operator of the flight.	
1939-11-17	Spanish Air Force	Ju 52 ditching off Cape Juby	10	Manuel Copano Taboada	Spain		M	C	Air observer on the flight.	
1941-10-30	Northwest Airlines	Flight 5	14	Clarence Bates	United States	41	M	C	Captain of the flight; died in another plane crash one year later.	
1942-08-25	Royal Air Force	Dunbeath air crash (Note: The aircraft involved, a Short Sunderland, was being used as a VIP transport.)	15	Andrew Jack	United Kingdom	20	M	C	Tail gunner of the flight. Fatalities included Prince George, Duke of Kent.	
1943-01-22	Pan American-Grace Airways	Flight 9	14	John Alfred Howard	United Kingdom	26	M	P		
1943-06-14	US Army Air Forces	Bakers Creek air crash (Note: The aircraft involved, a Boeing B-17 Flying Fortress, was being used as a personnel transport.)	40	Foye Kenneth Roberts	United States	22	M	P		
1943-07-04	Royal Air Force	Gibraltar Liberator AL523 crash (Note: The aircraft involved, a Consolidated B-24 Liberator, was being used as a personnel transport.)	16	Eduard Prchal	Czechoslovakia	33	M	C	Captain of the flight. Fatalities included Polish general Władysław Sikorski.	
1945-03-05	Luftwaffe	Resko Przymorskie Dornier Do 24 crash (Note: The aircraft involved, a Dornier Do 24, was being used to transport civilians.)	80		Nazi Germany		F	P		
1946-09-05	Trans-Luxury Airlines	Douglas C-47 crash in Elko	20	Peter Link	United States	3	M	P		
1947-01-12	Eastern Air Lines	Flight 665	18	William Keyes Jr.	United States	25	M	P		
1947-01-28	China National Aviation Corporation	Curtiss C-46 Commando crash in Hankou	25	Paul Ashton Vick	United States	1 (16 months)	M	P		
1947-02-01	Air France	Sintra Douglas C-47 crash	15	Eugène Léonard	France	38	M	P		
1948-03-10	Delta Air Lines	Flight 705	12	Tripolina Meo	United States	33	F	P		
1948-04-15	Pan Am	Flight 1–10	30	Mark Worst	United States	38	M	P		
1948-04-24	Aeroflot	Bodaybo Lisunov Li-2 crash	28					P		
1948-05-12	Sabena	Sabena Douglas DC-4 crash	31	Georges Moutafis	Egypt		M	P		
1948-07-17	Cathay Pacific	Miss Macao	25	Huang Yu (Note: Chinese: 黃裕, Hanyu Pinyin: Huáng Yù, Cantonese: Wong Yu)	Republic of China (1912–1949)	24	M	P	One of four hijackers of the aircraft.	
1949-07-21	Aeroflot	Ilyushin Il-12 crash in Nizhneudinsk	13					C		
1949-11-20	Aero Holland	Hurum air disaster	34	Isaac Allal	(French protectorate of Tunisia) French Tunisia (1881–1956)	12	M	P		
1950-05-24	LANSA	Galeras Douglas C-47 crash	25	Olga Rada	Colombia	10	F	P		
1950-07-27	US Air Force	Douglas C-47 crash near Ōshima Island	25	Haruo “Harry” Sazaki	United States	31	M	P		
1950-09-21	JAT Airways	Medvednica Douglas C-47 crash	10	Nikola Jovanović	Yugoslavia	23	M	C	Radio operator of the flight.	
1950-10-17	British European Airways	Mill Hill Douglas C-47 crash	28	James McKissick	United Kingdom	33	M	C	Flight attendant on the flight.	
1950-12-30	Aerolíneas Argentinas	Douglas C-47 crash in Camet	17	Susana Castilla	Argentina	7	F	P		
1951-03-25	Aeroflot	Lisunov Li-2 crash in Iskra	12					P		
1951-11-21	Deccan Airways	Douglas C-47 crash near Dum Dum Airport	16	C. N. Mehta	India		M	P		
1953-04-10	Caribbean International Airways	Lockheed Lodestar crash off Lime Cay near Kingston	13	Edward Remington Hobbs	United Kingdom	37	M	P		
1953-05-17	Delta Air Lines	Flight 318	19	Hazel Cox	United States	21	F	P		
1953-10-31	Aeroflot	Lisunov Li-2 crash near Kharkiv Airport	15					P		
1953-12-12	Indian Airlines	Douglas C-47 crash near Sonegaon Airport	13	Desmond Arthur Cartner	United Kingdom	28	M	C	Captain of the flight.	
1954-01-06	Royal Air Force	Aldbury Valetta accident	16	Patrick Cliff	United Kingdom	19	M	P		
1954-08-26	Aeroflot	Lisunov Li-2 crash near Yuzhno-Sakhalinsk	26		Soviet Union	40	M	P		
1956-05-24	Aviateca	Sierra de las Minas Douglas C-47 crash	30	Roberto Ovando	Guatemala	22	M	P		
1956-11-24	Linee Aeree Italiane	Flight 451	34	Concetta Finamore	Italy		F	P		
1957-03-17	Philippine Air Force	Cebu Douglas C-47 crash	25	Nestor Mata	Philippines	31	M	P	Reporter for the Philippine Herald. Fatalities included Ramon Magsaysay, president of the Philippines.	
1957-05-01	Eagle Aviation Limited	Blackbushe Viking accident	34	Ernest Taylor	United Kingdom	25	M	P		
1957-10-01	Aeroflot	Flight 11	27					P		
1958-05-20	US Air Force / Maryland Air National Guard	T-33 mid-air collision with Capital Airlines Flight 300	12	Julius McCoy	United States	34	M	C	Captain of the flight.	
1958-08-11	Lóide Aéreo Nacional	Douglas DC-4 crash near Belém-Val de Cans Airport	10	Cassiano Cirilo Anunciação	Brazil	27	M	P		
1959-01-16	Austral Líneas Aéreas	Flight 205	51	Roberto Servente	Argentina	39	M	P		
1959-10-23	Aeroflot	Flight 200	28					P		
1959-10-30	Piedmont Airlines	Flight 349	26	Phil Bradley	United States	33	M	P		
1959-12-01	Allegheny Airlines	Flight 371	25	Louis Matarazzo	United States	35	M	P		
1960-02-26	Aeroflot	Flight 315	32		Soviet Union	33	M	P		
1961-09-23	Turkish Airlines	Flight 835	28	Salih Kalafatoğlu	Turkey	40	M	P		
1962-01-27	Aeroflot / Ulyanovsk Flight School	Antonov An-10 crash in Baratayevka Airport	13					C		
1963-08-12	Air Inter	Flight 2611	16 (Note: Including 1 ground fatality)	Elsa Simon	France	5	F	P		
1965-04-14	British United Airways	Flight 1030X	26	Dominique Sillière	France	22	F	C	Flight attendant on the flight.	
1966-02-02	Pakistan International Airlines	Flight 17	23	Muhammad Abdul Mannan	East Pakistan	19	M	P		
1967-04-25	US Air Force	Lockheed EC-121H crash off Nantucket Island	15	Joseph Guenet	Canada	29	M	C	Navigator of the flight.	
1967-04-26	Avianca	Douglas C-47 crash near Sogamoso	17					C		
1967-06-24	Saudi Arabian Airlines	Douglas C-47 crash en route to Jeddah	16		Switzerland			P		
1968-02-29	Aeroflot	Flight 15	83	Vasily Andrienko	Soviet Union	21	M	P		
1968-03-09	Groupe de Liaisons Aériennes Ministérielles (GLAM)	Sainte-Marie Douglas DC-6 crash	19	Michèle Renard	France	27	F	P		
1970-01-25	Comisión Federal de Electricidad (CFE)	Convair CV-240 crash in Veracruz	19	Jesús Kramsky	Mexico	22	M	P		
1970-02-04	TAROM	Flight 35	20	Ludovic Alexandru Sarkadi	Romania	43	M	P		
1970-05-04	US Air Force	Convair T-29 crash near Hamilton Air Force Base	13	George A. Burk	United States	28	M	P		
1970-08-09	LANSA	Flight 502	101 (Note: Including 2 ground fatalities)	Juan Loo	Peru	26	M	C	First officer of the flight.	
1971-06-06	United States Marine Corps	F-4 mid-air collision with Hughes Airwest Flight 706	50	Christopher E. Schiess	United States	24	M	C	Radar operator of the flight.	
1971-12-24	LANSA	Flight 508	91	Juliane Koepcke	West Germany	17	F	P	Survived falling from 10,000 feet (3,000 m).	
1972-01-26	JAT Airways	Flight 367	27	Vesna Vulović	Yugoslavia	22	F	C	Flight attendant on the flight; survived falling from 33,000 feet (10,000 m).	
1973-04-12	US Navy	Sunnyvale mid-air collision	16	Bruce N. Mallibert	United States	22	M	C	Radar operator of the flight.	
1973-07-22	Pan Am	Flight 816	78	Neil James Campbell	Canada	28	M	P		
1973-08-22	Avianca	Douglas DC-3 crash near Yopal	16					P		
1977-07-20	Aeroflot	Flight B-2	39		Soviet Union	21	M	P		
1979-01-15	Aeroflot	Flight 7502	13	Viktoria "Vika" Bendeberya	Soviet Union	3	F	P		
1979-05-30	Downeast Airlines	Flight 46	17	John McCafferty	United States	16	M	P		
1981-08-24	Aeroflot	Flight 811 mid-air collision with Soviet Air Forces Tu-16	37	Larisa Savitskaya	Soviet Union	20	F	P	Survived falling from 17,000 feet (5,200 m).	
1981-09-02	Taxi Aéreo El Venado	Embraer Bandeirante crash in Paipa	21	Remberto Aparicio	Colombia	26	M	P		
1982-06-17	Ministry of Radio Equipment Production	Tupolev Tu-134 crash near Severomorsk-1 Naval Air Station	15	Viktor Khatkovsky	Soviet Union	38	M	C	Captain of the flight.	
1983-04-30	US Navy	Convair C-131 crash in Jacksonville	14	Melissa Kelly	United States	30	F	P		
1984-12-23	Aeroflot	Flight 3519	110		Soviet Union	27	M	P		
1985-01-21	Galaxy Airlines	Flight 203	70	George Lamson Jr.	United States	17	M	P		
1985-02-22	Air Mali	Air Mali Antonov An-24 crash	51	Ouologuem	Mali		M	P		
1987-01-03	Varig	Flight 797	50	Neuba Yessoh Damase	Ivory Coast	44	M	P		
1987-08-16	Northwest Airlines	Flight 255	156	Cecelia Cichan (Note: Later known by her married name, Crocker.)	United States	4	F	P		
1987-11-16	Libyan Air Force	Ilyushin Il-76 crash in Sebha	46					P		
1987-12-08	Peruvian Navy	Alianza Lima plane crash	43	Edilberto Villar	Peru		M	C	Captain of the flight. Fatalities included multiple members of Peruvian football club Alianza Lima.	
1988-12-11	Soviet Air Force	Soviet Air Force Ilyushin Il-76 crash	77	Fahraddin Balaev	Soviet Union		M	P		
1991-10-05	Indonesian Air Force	Jakarta Indonesian Air Force C-130 crash	135	Bambang Subandi	Indonesia	25	M	P		
1992-10-19	Aeroflot / Komiavia	Antonov An-28 crash in Ust-Kulomsky	15	Tatiana Yaroslavovna	Russia	30	F	P		
1992-11-14	Vietnam Airlines	Flight 474	30	Annette Herfkens	Netherlands	31	F	P		
1993-12-26	Kuban Airlines	Flight GW-5719	35	Smbat Martirosian	Georgia	21	M	P		
1994-04-25	Dirgantara Air Service	BN-2 Islander crash in Sintang	10	Nur Intan Fitriani	Indonesia	31	F	P		
1995-01-11	Intercontinental de Aviación	Flight 256	51	Erika Delgado	Colombia	9	F	P		
1995-09-21	MIAT Mongolian Airlines	Flight 557	42	Ulziibayar Sanjaa	Mongolia	33	M	P		
1996-11-14	Komiaviatrans	Antonov An-2 crash in Udorsky	14	Yuri Maslov	Russia		M	C	First officer of the flight	
1996-11-30	ACES Colombia	DHC-6 Twin Otter crash near Olaya Herrera Airport	14	Pedro Rafael Rojas	Colombia	39	M	P		
1996-12-07	Dirgantara Air Service	Flight 5940	18	Irianto	Indonesia	40	M	P		
1997-09-03	Vietnam Airlines	Flight 815	65 (Note: Accident final report states two survivors, as another passenger initially survived but later died from his injuries.)	Chanayuth Nim-anong	Thailand	1 (14 months)	M	P	Youngest known sole survivor, based on age at time of incident.	
1997-12-15	Tajik Air	Flight 3183	85	Sergei Petrov	Tajikistan	37	M	C	Navigator of the flight.	
2001-03-17	Sociedade de Aviação Ligeira	Beechcraft 1900 crash in Quilemba	16	Manuel González Pérez	Spain	25	M	P		
2003-03-06	Air Algérie	Flight 6289	102	Youcef Djillali	Algeria	28	M	P		
2003-07-08	Sudan Airways	Flight 139	116	Mohammed El Fateh Osman	Sudan	2	M	P		
2006-01-19	Slovak Air Force	Slovak Air Force Antonov An-24 crash	42	Martin Farkaš	Slovakia	27	M	P		
2006-08-27	Comair	Flight 5191	49	James M. Polehinke	United States	44	M	C	First officer of the flight.	
2007-01-09	AerianTur-M	AerianTur-M Antonov An-26 crash	34	Abdülkadir Akyüz	Turkey	31	M	P		
2007-08-26	Great Lakes Business Company	Kongolo Antonov An-32B crash	14			3	M	P		
2007-10-04	Malift Air	Africa One Antonov An-26 crash	51 (Note: Including 30 ground fatalities.)	Dédé Ngamba	Democratic Republic of the Congo		M	C	Aircraft's mechanic. Some sources state that there were two survivors.	
2008-10-08	Yeti Airlines	Flight 101	18	Surendra Kunwar	Nepal	41	M	C	Captain of the flight.	
2009-03-12	Cougar Helicopters	Flight 91	17	Robert Decker	Canada	28	M	P		
2009-06-30	Yemenia	Flight 626	152	Bahia Bakari	France	12	F	P		
2010-05-12	Afriqiyah Airways	Flight 771	103	Ruben van Assouw	Netherlands	9	M	P		
2010-08-25	Filair	Filair Let L-410 crash	20					P		
2011-04-04	Georgian Airways / United Nations	Flight 834	32	Francis Mwamba	Congo		M	P		
2011-09-07	Yak-Service	Lokomotiv Yaroslavl plane crash	44	Alexander Sizov	Russia	52	M	C	Aircraft's mechanic; oldest known sole survivor, based on age at time of incident. Fatalities included multiple members of the Lokomotiv Yaroslavl ice hockey team.	
2014-02-11	Algerian Air Force	Algerian Air Force C-130 crash	77	Nimer Djelloul	Algeria	21	M	P		
2014-05-17	Lao People's Liberation Army Air Force	Lao People's Liberation Army Air Force An-74 crash	16		Laos					
2014-07-07	Vietnam Air Force	Mil Mi-171 crash in Thạch Thất	20 (Note: Initially 3 survivors, one survivor died 2 weeks later and the other died 2 months later.)	Đinh Văn Dương	Vietnam	31	M	P		
2018-05-18	Cubana de Aviación	Flight 0972	112	Mailén Díaz Almaguer	Cuba	19	F	P		
2019-01-14	Saha Airlines	Saha Airlines Boeing 707 crash	15	Farshad Mahdavinejad	Iran		M	C	Flight Engineer of the flight.	
2019-11-24	Busy Bee Congo	Busy Bee Congo Dornier 228 crash	27 (Note: Including 6 ground fatalities)	Muma Emmanuel	Cameroon		M	P		
2020-09-25	Ukrainian Air Force	Chuhuiv An-26 crash	26	Viacheslav Zolochevsky	Ukraine	20	M	P		
2024-07-24	Saurya Airlines	Saurya Airlines Bombardier CRJ200 crash	18	Manish Shakya	Nepal	35	M	C	Captain of the flight.	
2025-01-29	Eagle Air / Light Air Services	Light Air Services Beechcraft 1900 crash	20	Emmanuel Maker Makoi	South Sudan		M	P		
2025-06-12	Air India	Flight 171	260 (Note: Including 19 ground fatalities)	Vishwash Kumar Ramesh	United Kingdom	40	M	P		

== See also ==
- Aviation accidents and incidents

== Bibliography ==
- Darby, Paul; Johnes, Martin; Mellor, Gavin (2005). Soccer and disaster (2005 ed.). Routledge. ISBN 978-0-7146-8289-1. Total pages: 193
- Williamson, Ronald M. (2000). Naval Air Station Jacksonville, Florida, 1940–2000: An Illustrated History (2000 ed.). Turner Publishing Company. ISBN 978-1-56311-730-5. Total pages: 200
- Congressional Record (2003 ed.). Washington, D.C.: United States Government Publishing Office. 2003. Total pages: 15,591
