= Dobrolet =

Dobrolet or Dobrolyot (Russian: Добролёт) may refer to:

- Dobrolyot, an early Soviet aviation company, a precursor of Aeroflot
- Dobrolet (airline), a defunct Russian low-cost airline
- Dobrolyot, Russia, a village in Russia
