= Dobrolet (airline) =

Russian low-cost airline

IATA	ICAO	Call sign
QD	DBR	DOBROLET
- Founded: October 2013
- Ceased operations: 4 August 2014
- Operating bases: Sheremetyevo International Airport
- Fleet size: 3
- Destinations: 9
- Parent company: Aeroflot
- Headquarters: Moscow, Russia
- Key people: Andrey Kalmykov (CEO)
- Website: www.dobrolet.com

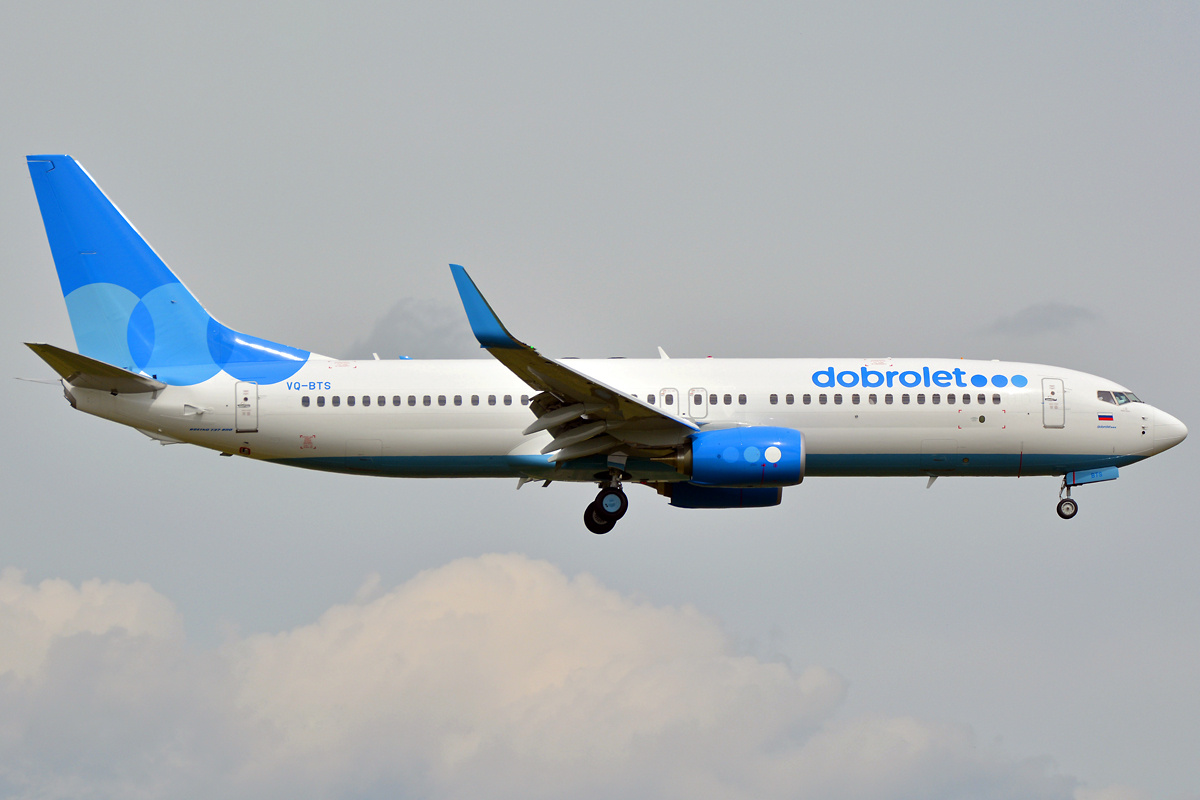
Dobrolet Boeing 737-800

Dobrolet LLC (Russian: ООО «Добролёт», romanized: OOO Dobrolyot) was a Russian low-cost airline - a subsidiary of Aeroflot - based at Sheremetyevo International Airport. It operated scheduled flights to domestic destinations before it ceased operation on 4 August 2014.

== History ==
=== Background ===
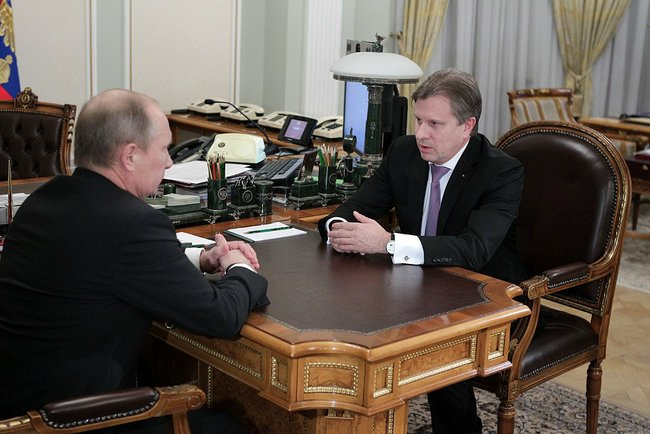
Aeroflot CEO Vitaly Savelyev meeting with Russian President Vladimir Putin at Novo-Ogaryovo in October 2012, during which discussions surrounding what would eventually lead to the creation of Dobrolet were held.

The operation of low-cost airlines in Russia to date has not been met with success. Sky Express was the first attempt at a Russian low-cost airline and began operations in 2007; it ceased operations in October 2011 after experiencing financial difficulties with all aircraft and flights being transferred to Kuban Airlines. Avianova, founded in 2009 and the fastest growing low-cost airline in Russia, ceased operations twenty days before SkyExpress due to unresolvable disputes between its shareholders; the Russian A1 Investments and the US-based Indigo Partners.

In October 2012, Aeroflot General-Director Vitaly Savelyev held a meeting with Russian President Vladimir Putin at Novo-Ogaryovo residence at which the operations of the Russian flag carrier and the creation of conditions optimal for the operation of low-cost airlines in Russia were discussed. During the meeting Savelyev told Putin that Aeroflot was committed to staying a full-service premium airline, but given the right legislative conditions the flag carrier would be ready to launch a low-cost airline in a six- to twelve-month period.

Experts had attributed part of the failure of SkyExpress and Avianova to unfavourable legislative conditions, and during the course of the meeting Savelyev noted the legislative changes which would need to implemented to create favourable conditions for the establishment of a true low-cost airline in Russia. Amongst them, Article 108 of the Russian Air Code would need to be amended in order to allow airlines to sell passengers non-refundable tickets and Article 56 of the Russian Air Code would need to be amended to allow the hiring of foreign pilots. Federal aviation rules would need amending to allow for airlines to charge passengers for baggage, who were then allowed to check in 10 kilograms for no charge, and rules would need to be amended to allow airlines not to serve meals on board, something which was then prohibited. Additionally, it was Savelyev's contention that low-cost airlines should operate from their own airport, in order to keep airport taxes to a minimum, and for import duties on aircraft with more than 170 seats to be scrapped.

Such changes were expected to hit obstacles as numerous government ministries had expressed their opposition to such changes—the Ministry of Transport was opposed to relaxing conditions on the serving of inflight meals and free luggage allowances; the Ministry of Economic Development and the Ministry of Industry were opposed to abolishing import duties on aircraft as this would impact on the Irkut MC-21 program; and the Federal Service for Supervision of Consumer Rights Protection and Human Welfare and the Federal Antimonolopy Service were against the introduction of a non-refundable ticket regime in Russia. However, for his part, Putin agreed with Savelyev that numerous legislative changes should be looked at, but was hesitant to lend his support on the idea of the hiring of foreign pilots as he stated this would require further indepth discussions and negotiations with the relevant trade unions.

=== Formation ===
On 17 September 2013, Savelyev announced that the Aeroflot board had resolved at its August meeting that the company would begin planning of a stand-alone low-cost airlines – it would not be carved out of the mainline company – and that the board had committed itself to allocating funding for the project in 2013, and further in 2014 from the company's budget.

Dobrolet, LLC was registered on 4 October 2013 with Aeroflot as the only shareholder. On 10 October 2013, Savelyev acknowledged the formation of the company and publicly announced that the name of the Aeroflot's new stand-alone low-cost airline would be Dobrolet; the same name as an early Soviet airline which itself preceded the formation of Aeroflot, and whose name translates loosely to good flight. It was announced that it was expected for the airline to launch flights in 2014 with flights from Moscow to 8 Russian cities – Saint Petersburg, Krasnodar, Yekaterinburg, Samara, Makhachkala, Ufa, Kaliningrad and Novy Urengoy, whilst expanding its network in the second year of operation to 19 destinations, and furthermore to 26 destinations in its third year. The airline also expected to begin foreign flights in 2016 to destinations such as Barcelona, Kyiv, Yerevan and Istanbul.

Following the annexation of the Crimea by the Russian Federation, on 27 March 2014 Prime Minister Dmitry Medvedev instructed Russian Railways and Aeroflot to submit proposals to the Russian government on transport accessibility to the newly annexed territory, and in the case of Aeroflot the proposal should see "a larger number of flights in Crimea and the city of Sevastopol, particularly with the use of a low-budget air carrier."

Tickets for the first route from Moscow to Simferopol went on sale on 26 May 2014 with one-way fares ranging between 999 and 3,499 rubles, and it was reported that within 24 hours some four thousand tickets were sold. All fares included one piece of carry-on luggage weighing up to 10 kilograms, with all other extras such as meals and pre-flight seat selection attracting additional charges.

=== Commencement of operations ===
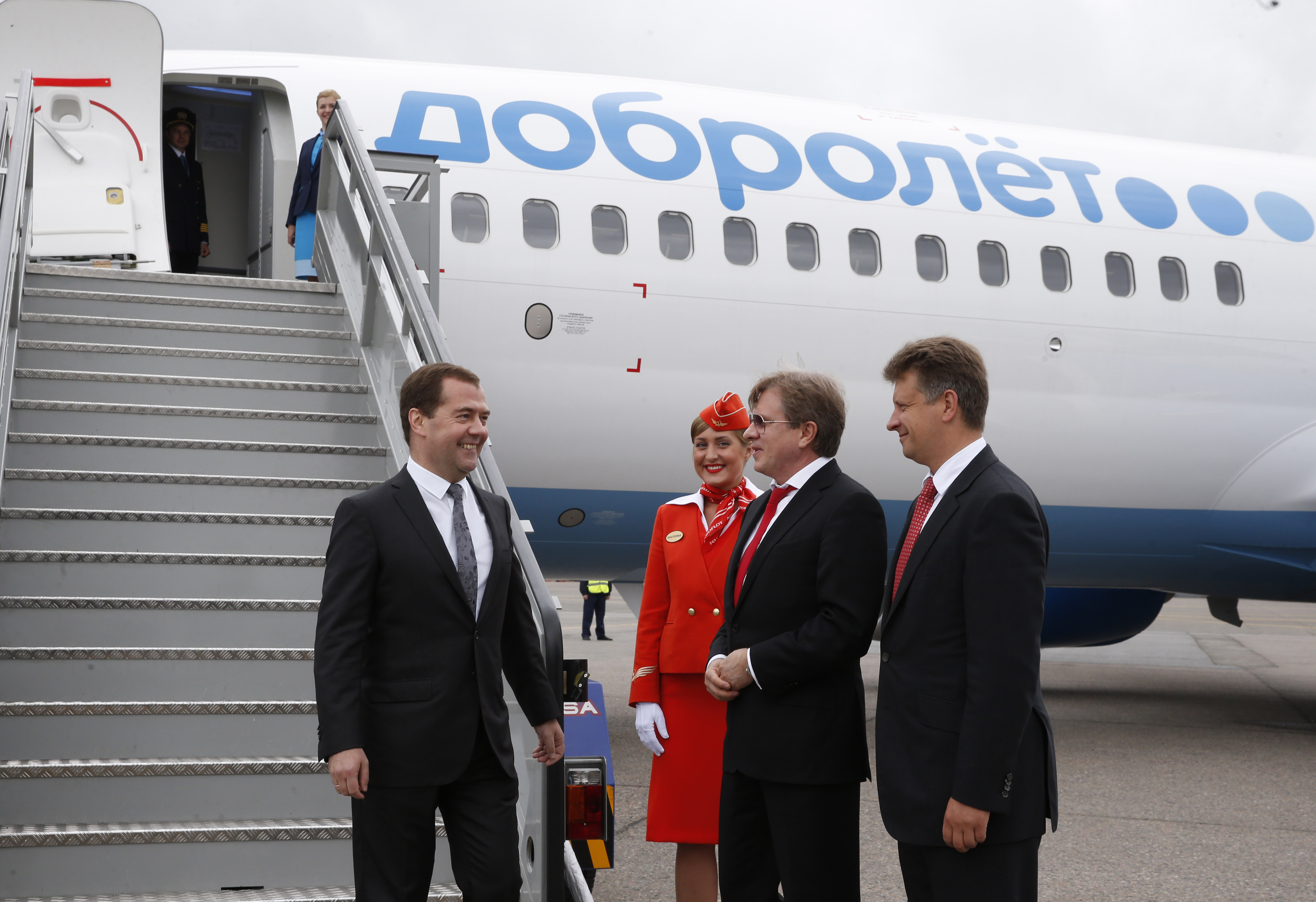
Russian Prime Minister Dmitry Medvedev inspected the Boeing 737-800 on 10 June 2014 at Sheremetyevo International Airport, prior to the inaugural flight to Simferopol.

Dobrolet operated its first commercial flight on the Moscow to Simferopol route on 10 June 2014. Prior to the flight, which was fully booked, the aircraft was inspected by Dmitry Medvedev, who also greeted Dobrolet customers who were booked on the flight. After inspecting the aircraft, Medvedev is reported as saying "The plane is cool, it's completely new. Its seats are narrow, but the flights aren't very long so I hope everything will be OK."

=== EU sanctions and shutdown ===
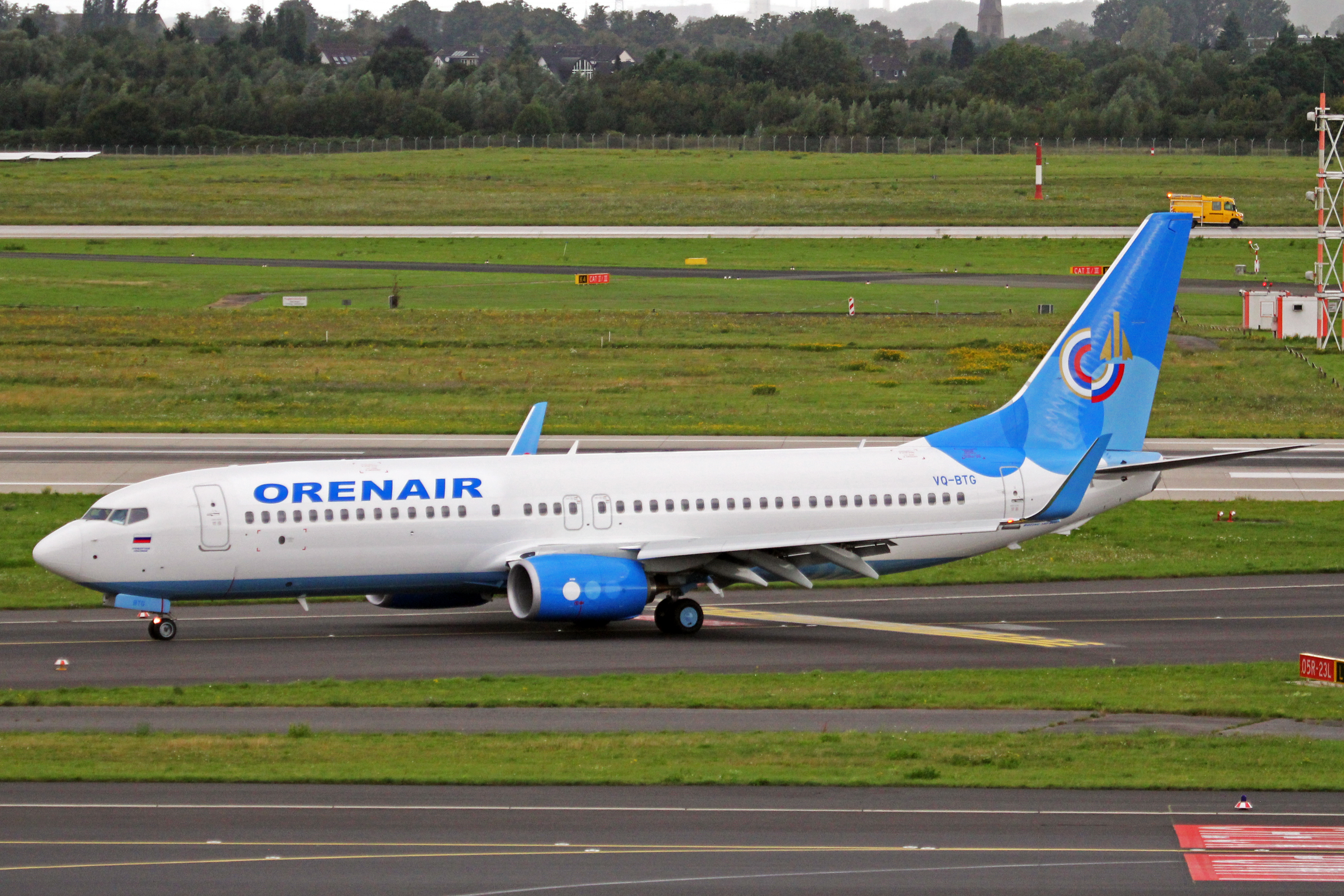
Following the shutdown, Dobrolet aircraft were transferred to Orenair, and put into service on that airlines' routes. Boeing 737-800 (VQ-BTG) is seen here at Düsseldorf Airport on 18 August 2014 in a hybrid Dobrolet-Orenair livery operating an Orenair flight.

In the aftermath of the unsolved shootdown on 17 July 2014 of Malaysia Airlines Flight 17 in eastern Ukraine, on 30 July 2014 the European Union placed additional sanctions on Russian individuals and entities, amongst them Dobrolet, LLC. The EU justified the sanctions on Dobrolet as it was state-owned and Dobrolet had operated only on the Moscow to Simferopol route, which in the view of the EU facilitates what it deemed to be the illegal integration of Crimea and Sevastopol into the Russian Federation and thereby it deems the act of flights to Crimea to be supporting the violation of Ukrainian sovereignty.

In accordance with the EU sanctions, supply of materials and investments in Russia were prohibited while its citizens were banned from providing economic resources. European partners of Dobrolet began to cancel contracts they held with the airline, covering aircraft leasing, maintenance and insurance. Irish-based SMBC Aviation Capital cancelled leasing agreements for a 737-800, and Lufthansa Technik cancelled agreements to provide maintenance on the Dobrolet Boeing-fleet. The EU also stopped providing aeronautical information.

Due to the sanctions and the resultant contract cancellations by its partners, on 3 August 2014 the management of Dobrolet announced that all flight operations would cease as of the next day. With this announcement, Dobrolet became the first company to cease operations due to EU sanctions, leading Moscow to threaten more tit-for-tat sanctions in response.

At the time of the shutdown, the airline had managed to sell some 95,000 tickets. It was announced that ticket holders for Dobrolet flights from Moscow to Simferopol and Volgograd would have their flights provided by Orenair until 15 September and 20 August, respectively. Other customers with paid for flights past these dates, and including flights to destinations for which service had not yet begun, would receive a full refund.

Nevertheless, on 6 August the company announced it has ordered sixteen new Boeing 737-800 airplanes to be produced in 2017–2018.

=== Post shutdown ===
On 16 September 2014, it was announced that Aeroflot had registered a new company, ООО «Бюджетный перевозчик» (English: Budget Carrier, LLC), which was pointedly known as Pobeda, which means "Victory". Pobeda added some Dobrolet aircraft to its own fleet, and use the same livery as Dobrolet.

== Destinations ==
The company served nine destinations (as of October 2014):

Russia:

- Kazan – Kazan International Airport
- Moscow – Sheremetyevo International Airport
- Perm – Perm International Airport
- Samara – Kurumoch International Airport
- Surgut – Surgut International Airport
- Ufa – Ufa International Airport
- Volgograd – Volgograd International Airport
- Yekaterinburg – Koltsovo Airport
- Simferopol – Simferopol International Airport

== Fleet ==
The Dobrolet Airlines fleet included the following aircraft (as of May 2014):

Aircraft	In Fleet	Orders	Passengers			Notes
Aircraft	In Fleet	Orders	C	Y	Total	Notes
Boeing 737-800	2	8	0	189	189	VQ-BTS, VQ-BTG
