= Flight 815 =

Flight 815 may refer to

- Vietnam Airlines Flight 815 crashed on 3 September 1997
- the fictional Oceanic Airlines Flight 815 in Lost season 1
