= Flight 5 =

Flight 5 or Flight 005 may refer to the following accidents involving commercial airliners:

- Northwest Airlines Flight 5 (1941) from Minneapolis to Fargo, which experienced severe icing and crashed on 30 October 1941
- Lufthansa Flight 005 from Frankfurt to Bremen, which crashed on 28 January 1966, killing all 46 people on board
- Northwest Airlines Flight 5 (1990) from Miami to Minneapolis, which lost an engine on 4 January 1990

== Other uses ==
- Starship flight test 5, a fully successful flight of the SpaceX Starship rocket in October 2024, including the first catch of a Super Heavy booster
