= Sky Express =

Sky Express may refer to:

- Sky Express (Greece), a Greek airline
- Sky Express (Russia), a defunct Russian airline
