= Kuban Airlines Flight 5719 =

1993 aviation accident in Armenia

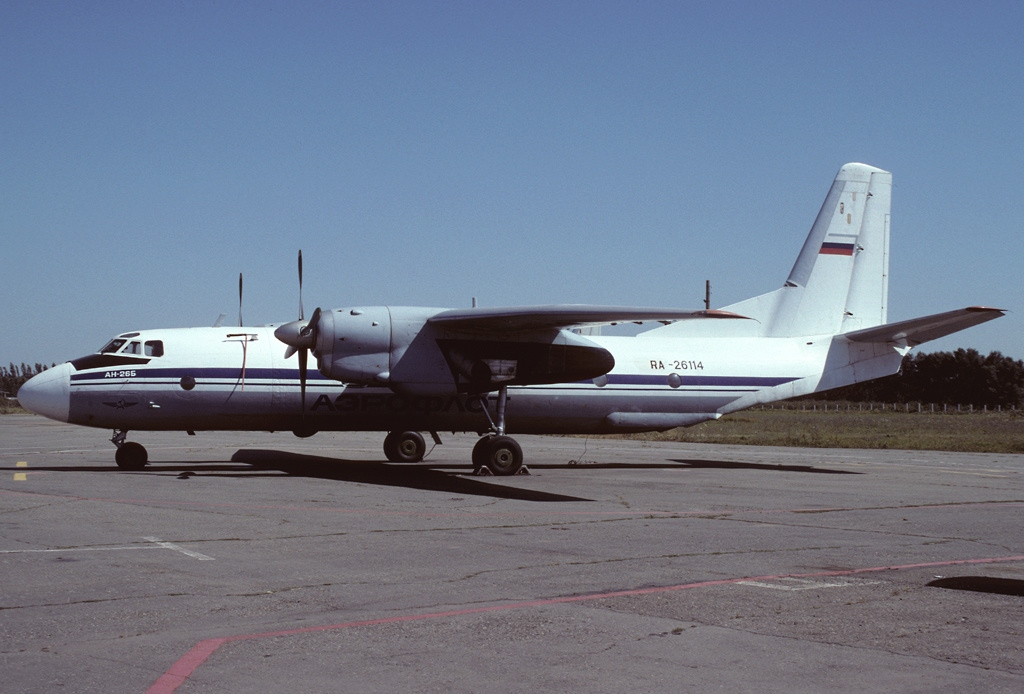
- An Antonov An-26b of Kuban Airlines, similar to the one involved in the crash

Accident
- Date: 26 December 1993
- Summary: Overloading leading to stall during attempted go-around
- Site: Shirak International Airport, Gyumri, Armenia; 40.739167°N 43.853611°E

Aircraft
- Aircraft type: Antonov An-26b
- Operator: Kuban Airlines
- Registration: RA-26141
- Flight origin: Pashkovsky, Krasnodar, Russia
- Destination: Leniankan, Gyumri, Armenia
- Occupants: 36
- Passengers: 31
- Crew: 5
- Fatalities: 35
- Injuries: 1
- Survivors: 1

On 26 December 1993, Kuban Airlines Flight 5719, a scheduled international flight flying from Krasnodar International Airport, Russia, to Gyumri Shirak International Airport, Armenia, stalled and subsequently crashed whilst attempting a go-around on approach to the airport. Out of the 36 occupants on board, 35 were killed. The sole survivor was injured.

== Aircraft ==
The aircraft involved, manufactured in 1983, was an Antonov An-26B registered as RA-26141. A twin-engine turboprop aircraft, it was powered by Ivchenko AI-24VT engines.

== Accident ==
On 26 December 1993, the aircraft, operating Flight 5719, was scheduled to fly from Krasnodar International Airport, Krasnodar, Russia to Gyumri Shirak International Airport, Gyumri, Armenia. It was transporting two cars, including a Lada Niva, and luggage. The flight was supposed to carry 6 passengers. However, the crew let 31 passengers board, contrary to the official flight manifest that listed 6 passengers. According to Komsomolskaya Pravda, the aircraft's weight exceeded its maximum takeoff weight (MTOW) of 2,246 kilograms (4,952 lb).

== See also ==
- Sakha Avia Flight 301 — A similar disaster that occurred 4 months earlier.
- 1993 in aviation
