= Sky Express (Russia) =

Russian low-cost airline

Sky Express Скай Экспресс
| IATA | ICAO | Call sign |
|---|---|---|
| XW | SXR | SKYSTORM |
- Founded: 2006
- Commenced operations: 29 January 2007
- Ceased operations: 29 October 2011
- Operating bases: Moscow-Vnukovo
- Fleet size: 9
- Destinations: 9
- Parent company: Kuban Airlines (2011)
- Headquarters: Moscow, Russia
- Key people: Marina Vladimirovna Bukalova (MD)
- Website: skyexpress.ru

CJSC Sky Express (Russian: ЗАО «Небесный Экспресс»), simply known as Sky Express and in Russian as Скай Экспресс, was a Russian low-cost airline. Its main base was Vnukovo International Airport, Moscow, Russia. Sky Express was the first airline to focus on being a low-cost domestic airline in Russia. It operated from January 2007 until October 2011.

== History ==
The airline was established in March 2006 by a consortium of investors which included KrasAir CEO Boris Abramovich, EBRD, Altima Partners and others, becoming Russia's first low-cost airline. The first flight took off on 29 January 2007 from Moscow to Sochi. Only 20 days after the only other Russian low-cost airline, Avianova, ceased its operations, Sky Express also decided to stop all flights from 29 October 2011. Its fleet and brand name was transferred to Kuban Airlines.

== Destinations ==
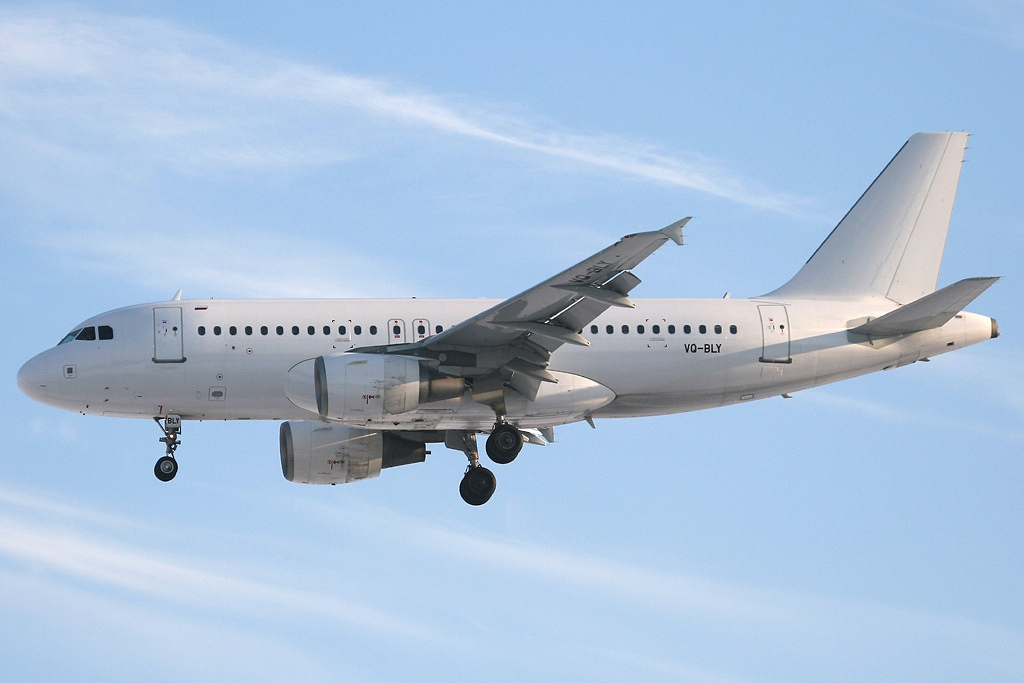
Sky Express Airbus A319-100

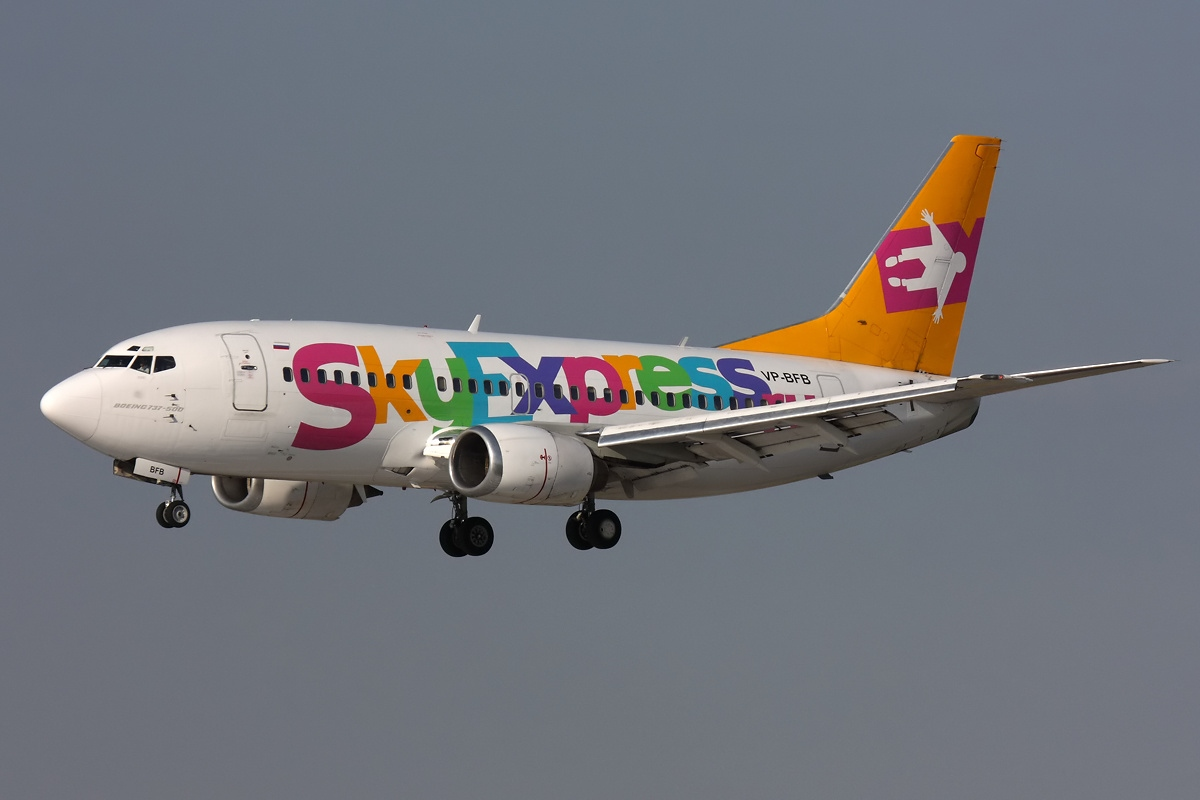
Sky Express Boeing 737-500

As of March 2011, Sky Express served the following destinations:

=== Scheduled flights ===
- Russia
  - Anapa – Anapa Airport
  - Chelyabinsk – Chelyabinsk Balandino Airport
  - Kaliningrad – Khrabrovo Airport
  - Krasnodar – Krasnodar International Airport
  - Moscow – Vnukovo Airport, base
  - Murmansk – Murmansk Airport
  - Orenburg – Orenburg Tsentralny Airport
  - Perm – Bolshoye Savino Airport
  - Rostov on Don – Rostov-on-Don Airport
  - Saint Petersburg – Pulkovo Airport
  - Sochi – Adler-Sochi International Airport
  - Tyumen – Roschino Airport
  - Yekaterinburg – Koltsovo Airport

=== Charter flights ===
Additionally, Sky Express operated charter flights on a seasonal basis to the following destinations during the summer of 2009 and 2010:

- Finland (winter 2009–2010)
  - Kuusamo – Kuusamo Airport
  - Rovaniemi – Rovaniemi Airport
- Greece
  - Heraklion – Nikos Kazantzàkis International Airport
  - Corfu – Ioannis Kapodistrias International Airport
  - Rhodes – Diagoras International Airport
- Hungary
  - Sármellék – Sármellék International Airport
- Montenegro
  - Tivat – Tivat Airport
- Spain
  - Ibiza – Ibiza Airport
- Republic of Macedonia
  - Ohrid – St. Paul the Apostle Airport
- Sweden
  - Östersund – Åre/Östersund (winter 2009–2010)
- Turkey
  - Istanbul – Atatürk International Airport

== Fleet ==
The Sky Express fleet consisted of the following aircraft in November 2011:

| Aircraft | Total | Passengers |
|---|---|---|
| Airbus A319-100 | 3 | 156 |
| Boeing 737-300 | 2 | 148 |
| Boeing 737-500 | 2 | 132 |

== Incidents and accidents ==
- On 24 October 2008, the crew of Sky Express flight XW230 from Sochi to Vnukovo Airport with 132 passengers, reported an attempted hijacking by a drunk passenger, and threatened to explode a bomb demanding the airplane to divert to Vienna. The crew raised a hijack alert almost immediately after liftoff. Emergency services and police were awaiting the plane in Moscow, and the passenger was arrested.
- On 2 April 2009, a Boeing 737 of Sky Express made an emergency landing at Vnukovo Airport shortly after takeoff when abnormal vibrations from the jet's left engine were detected by the crew. None of the 69 people on board were hurt.
