= Piedmont Airlines Flight 349 =

1959 aviation accident

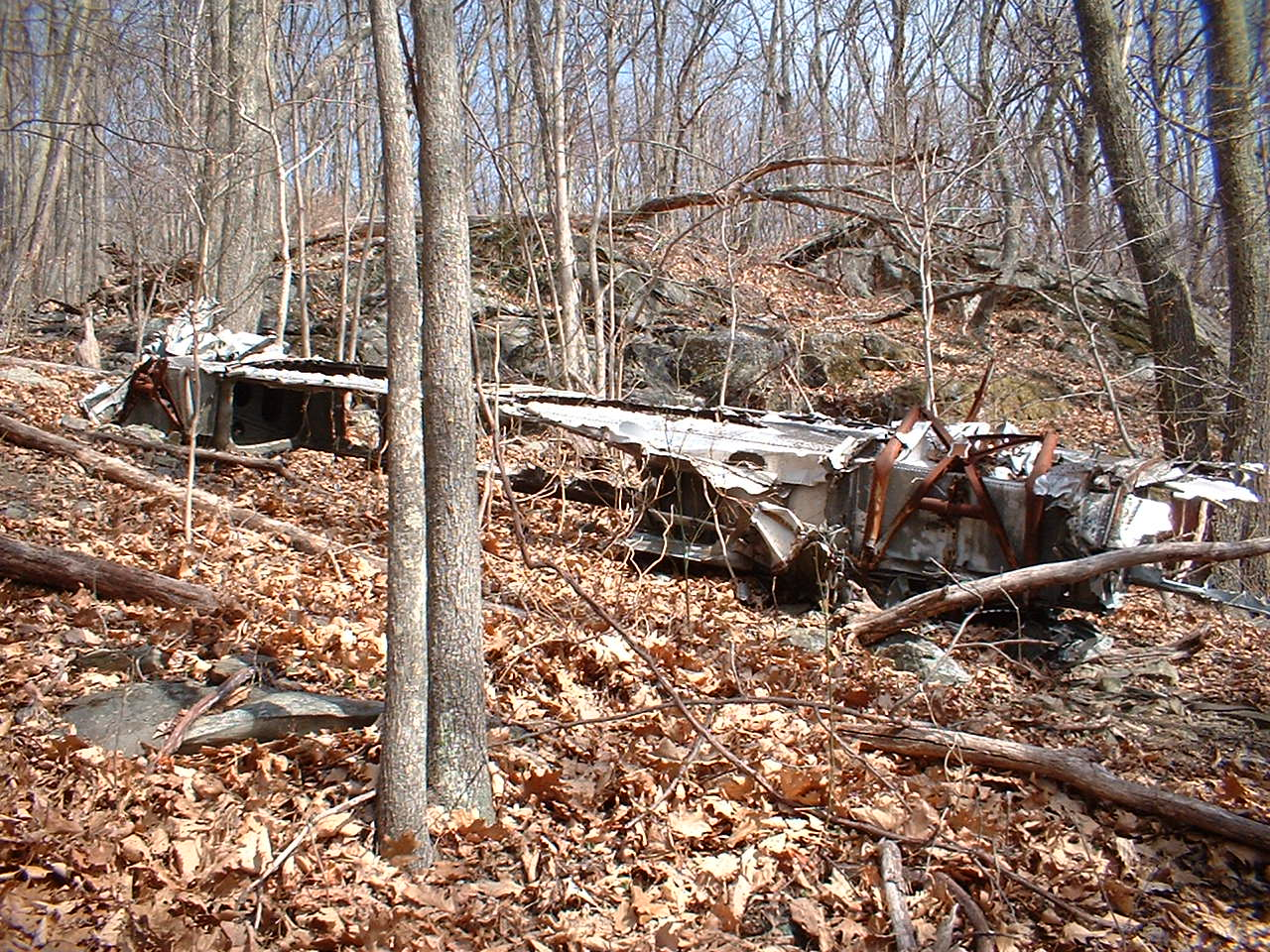
- The wreckage of Flight 349 in February 2002.

Accident
- Date: October 30, 1959
- Summary: Controlled flight into terrain due to pilot error
- Site: Bucks Elbow Mountain, Albemarle County, Virginia, U.S. (near Crozet, Virginia, U.S.); 38°06′15″N 78°43′53″W

Aircraft
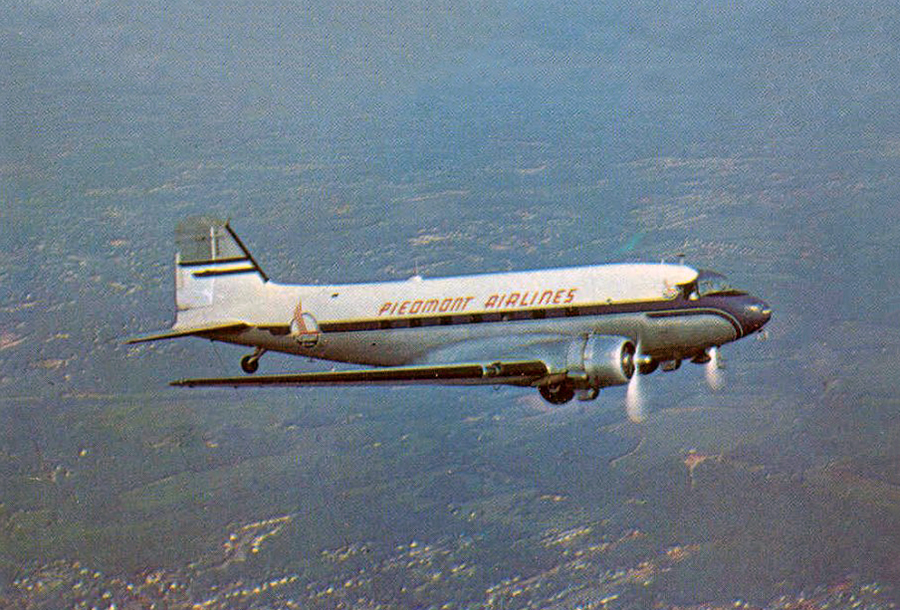
- N55V, the aircraft involved in the accident
- Aircraft type: Douglas DC-3
- Aircraft name: Buckeye Pacemaker
- Operator: Piedmont Airlines
- Registration: N55V
- Flight origin: Washington National Airport, Washington, D.C., United States
- 1st stopover: Charlottesville–Albemarle Airport, Virginia, United States
- Last stopover: Preston Glenn Airport, Virginia, United States
- Destination: Roanoke Regional Airport, Virginia, United States
- Occupants: 27
- Passengers: 24
- Crew: 3
- Fatalities: 26
- Injuries: 1
- Survivors: 1 (Ernest P. Bradley)

On October 30, 1959, Piedmont Airlines Flight 349, a Douglas DC-3, crashed on Bucks Elbow Mountain near Crozet, Virginia, killing the crew of three and all but one of its twenty-four passengers. The sole survivor was seriously injured and lay on the ground near the wreckage, still strapped in his seat.

== Aircraft ==
The accident aircraft, named Buckeye Pacemaker, was registered as N55V and had construction number 20447. The aircraft had previously flown with Meteor Air Transport as N53593 and was sold to Piedmont Airlines in December 1956.

== Accident ==
The aircraft was on an instrument landing system (ILS) approach to Charlottesville–Albemarle Airport, after taking off from Washington National Airport. While performing an inbound turn towards the runway, the wing clipped the ground, and the aircraft struck the ground on Bucks Elbow Mountain at 2,600 feet (790 m).

== Investigation ==
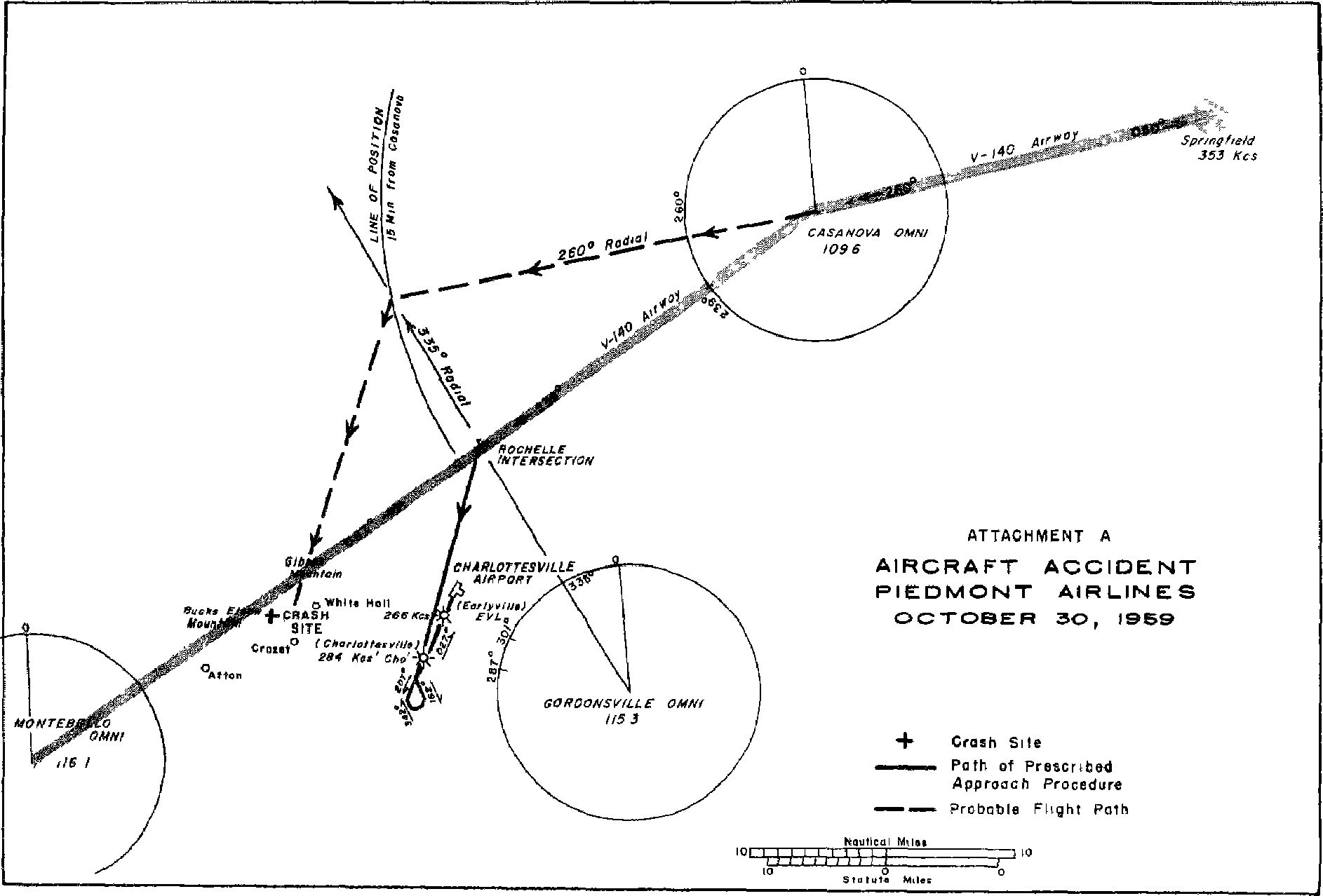
A diagram of the plane's flight path

The subsequent investigation determined the cause of the accident to be:

A navigational omission which resulted in a lateral course error that was not detected and corrected through precision instrument flying procedures. A contributing factor to the accident may have been pre-occupation of the captain resulting from mental stress.

== Opposing view ==
The Air Line Pilots Association conducted its own investigation and came to a very different conclusion. Rather than missing the one turn on their flight, the pilot and co-pilot, according to ALPA, may have been led astray by faulty radio beacons. The ALPA report, citing numerous instances of an intermittent signal at the beacon for the Charlottesville airport, found that the beacon for a private field in Hagerstown, Maryland, could have overridden and caused the collision with the mountain.

== See also ==
- List of sole survivors of aviation accidents and incidents
