= Eastern Air Lines Flight 665 =

1947 domestic flight crash in Virginia, US

Coordinates: 36.661°N 80.988°W

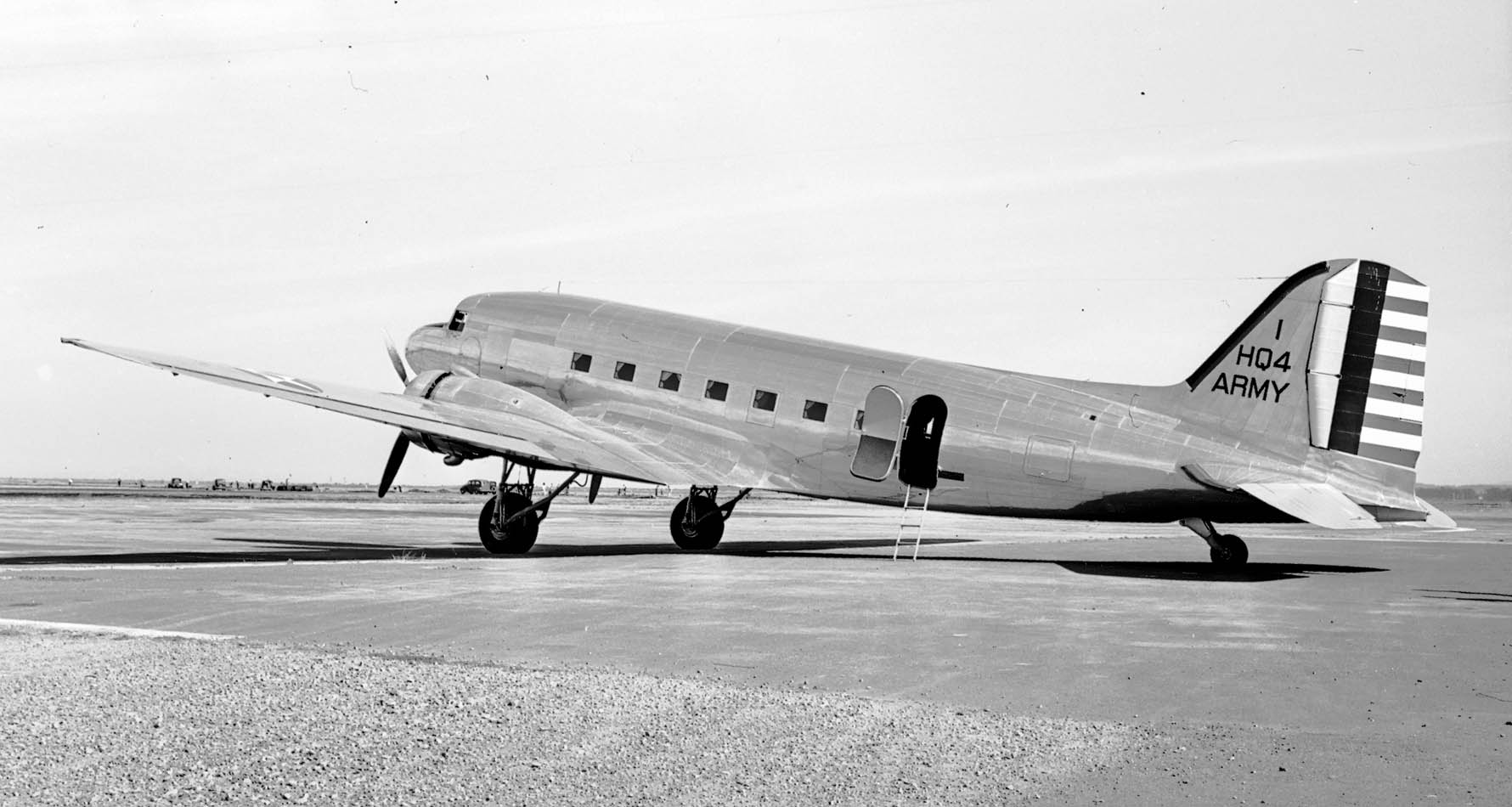
- A C-49 similar to the aircraft

Accident
- Date: January 12, 1947
- Summary: Controlled flight into terrain
- Site: Fries, Virginia, United States of America

Aircraft
- Aircraft type: Douglas C-49-DO
- Operator: Eastern Air Lines
- Registration: NC88872
- Occupants: 19
- Passengers: 16
- Crew: 3
- Fatalities: 18
- Injuries: 1
- Survivors: 1

Eastern Air Lines Flight 665 was a domestic airline flight, on January 12, 1947, using a Douglas C-49-DO, which deviated from its course during a rainstorm, struck high ground a few miles west of Galax, Virginia, and burned, killing all but one of the 19 aboard.

== Origin ==
The flight, which originated at Akron–Canton Airport, Green, Ohio, and was bound for Smith Reynolds Airport, Winston-Salem, North Carolina, with 16 passengers and three crew, was due to land at 0123 hrs EST. At 0114 hrs., the pilot radioed that he was little more than five miles southeast of the field and at 7,000 feet. That was the last contact with the flight. Winston-Salem is about 85 miles southeast of the crash scene.

== Crash ==
The converted C-49 Skytrain, coming in from the east, struck trees behind the Providence Church in the Providence community in Grayson County, just west-northwest of Galax, Virginia, and cut a path about 500 yards long. "The wings were ripped off and the fuselage came to rest against a fill where a dirt road leads from highway No. 94 into the church. It was a scant five feet from the pavement on the North-South highway and about a 100 yards from the intersection with route 95." The time of the crash was fixed at 0140 hrs. by a resident who checked a clock when she heard the impact. She immediately called the fire department. The plane impacted at an altitude of about 2,500 feet.

The sole surviving passenger, 25-year-old William Keyes Jr., was saved by two members of the Providence community who ripped his seat from the burning fuselage. The Galax fire department and rescue squad arrived in 20 minutes and extinguished the fire with chemicals and water. They pulled 18 badly charred bodies from the wreck in an hour and a half.

== Aircraft ==
The airliner had been ordered by Transcontinental & Western Air, Inc. as a DC-3-384, NC1949, but was impressed by the U.S. Army Air Force before delivery as C-49-DO, 41-7689, c/n 3274, with first flight in 1941. It went to the Reconstruction Finance Corporation on November 29, 1945, was purchased by Eastern Airlines and registered NC88872.

== Cause ==
The Civil Aeronautics Board report on the accident stated that the cause was "The action of the pilot in attempting a let-down without having positively determined the position of the aircraft. A contributing factor was the erroneous navigation of the pilot which on at least two occasions led him to believe that he was farther south than he actually was"
