= Delta Air Lines Flight 705 =

Aviation accident

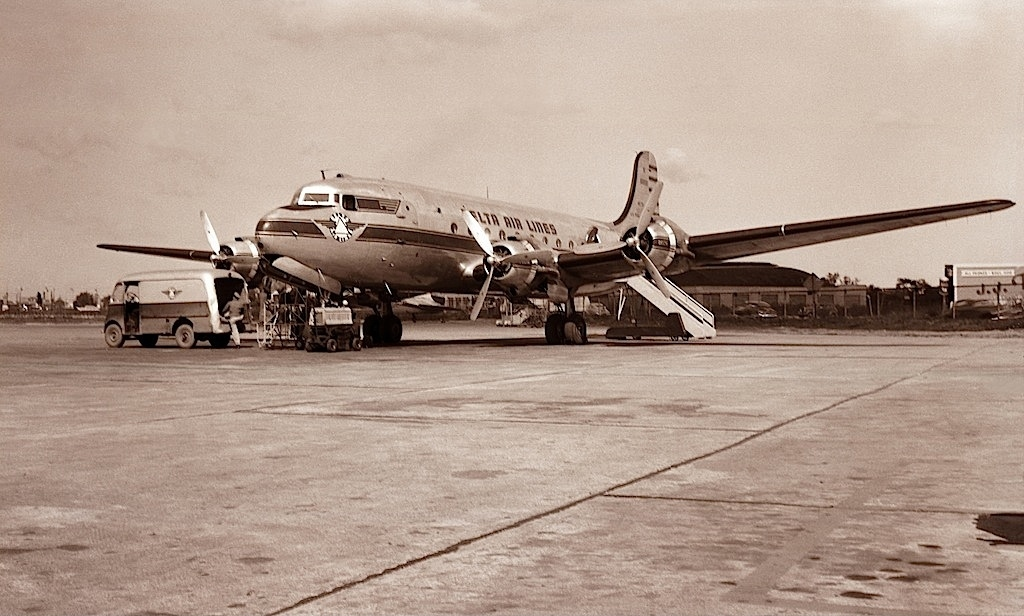
- Douglas DC-4 of Delta Air Lines in at Chicago Midway International Airport in 1947

Accident
- Date: 10 March 1948
- Summary: Stalled due to loss of pitch control during takeoff, cause undetermined.
- Site: near Forest View, Illinois, United States

Aircraft
- Aircraft type: Douglas DC-4
- Operator: Delta Air Lines
- Registration: NC37478
- Flight origin: Chicago Municipal Airport, United States
- Destination: Miami International Airport, United States
- Occupants: 13
- Passengers: 9
- Crew: 4
- Fatalities: 12
- Survivors: 1

Delta Air Lines Flight 705 (flight number: DL705, radio call sign: DELTA 705) was a regularly scheduled Delta Air Lines domestic flight from Chicago Municipal Airport, to Miami International Airport.

On 10 March 1948, the Douglas DC-4 crashed while taking off from Chicago Municipal Airport. The accident, occurring during the initial climb, killed 12 of the 13 people on board. The accident happened due to a loss of longitudinal controllability but the cause of the loss of control is unknown.

== Aircraft ==
The aircraft was a Douglas DC-4 with the serial number 18390, built during the Second World War as a military version C-54B-15-DO at the Douglas Aircraft Company factory in Santa Monica, California, with military aircraft registration number 43-17190. After its final assembly in 1944 she was delivered to the United States Army Air Forces (USAAF). After its military service ended, the aircraft was converted into a civilian DC-4 and registered for Delta Air Lines on 29 April 1946 with aircraft registration number NC37478. The aircraft was equipped with four Pratt & Whitney R-2000-2SD-13G Twin Wasp radial engines. At the time of the accident, the machine had flown for 6,509 hours.

== Crew ==
There were nine passengers and four crew members on board. The captain was the 36-year-old Grover L. Holloway who was with Delta Air Lines since 1939. He had 9,830 hours of flying hours, including 1,611 hours on a Douglas DC-4 aircraft. The first officer was the 26-year-old John S. Disosway who was with Delta Air Lines since 1946 after gaining extensive experience as a pilot in the US Army Air Forces (USAAF). He had 2,976 hours of flying experience, including 1,366 hours on the Douglas DC-4.

== Accident ==
On 10 March 1948 the plane initially flew from Miami International Airport to Chicago Municipal Airport where it landed at 9:06 pm. For the return flight, the plane departed from the gate at 10:45 p.m. and took off from the right southbound runway was at 10:57 p.m. At the time of the takeoff it was snowing. The takeoff appeared to be normal until an altitude of 150-200 feet was reached. The aircraft took on an increasingly steep pitch angle until it rose almost vertically. At an altitude of 500-800 feet, a stall occurred and the aircraft fell nose-first and over the right wing towards the ground. A partial recovery from the stall was made before the aircraft crashed to the ground and burst into flames. As a result of the accident, the aircraft caught fire. After an hour the fire was still not extinguished and burned down. The four crew members and eight of the nine passengers died. The sole survivor was Tripolina Meo, who lost her son in the crash.

== Investigation ==
The accident was investigated by the Civil Aeronautics Board. Over a year after the accident, on 13 June 1949 they published their report. The investigators were able to determine the cause of the accident being as a loss of longitudinal controllability of the aircraft. However, they were unable to determine the cause of the loss of control.
