= Avianova (Russia) =

Russian airline

Avianova Авианова
| IATA | ICAO | Call sign |
|---|---|---|
| AO | NET | NOVA |
- Founded: 2009
- Commenced operations: 27 August 2009
- Ceased operations: 10 October 2011
- Operating bases: Sheremetyevo International Airport
- Secondary hubs: Krasnodar
- Fleet size: 6
- Destinations: 22
- Parent company: Alfa Group (51%)
- Headquarters: Moscow, Russia
- Key people: Andrew Pyne (CEO); Vladimir Gorbunov (General Director)
- Website: www.avianova.com

Avianova, LLC (Russian: ООО «Авианова») was a low-cost airline based in Moscow, Russia. From its hub at Sheremetyevo International Airport, the carrier served a number of destinations within Russia, as well as an international destination within Ukraine.

== History ==
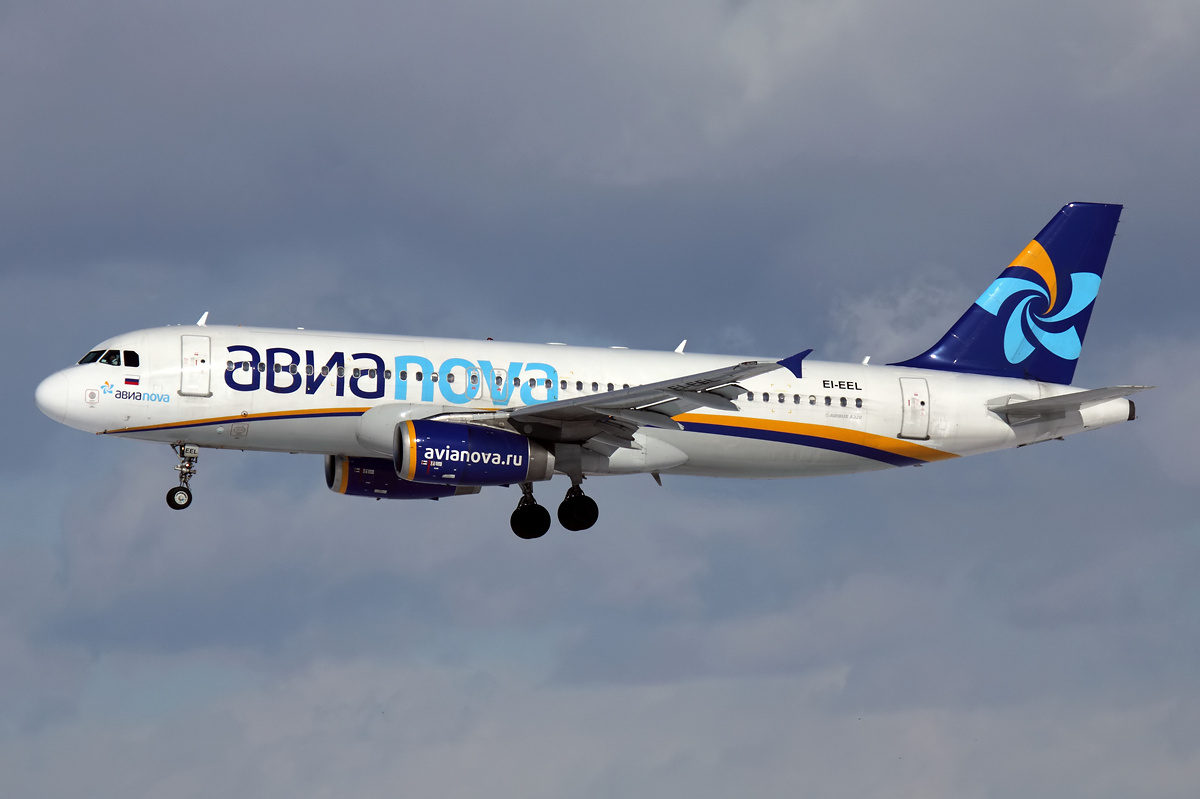
An Avianova Airbus A320-200 at Pulkovo Airport. (2011)

The company was first registered in 2006. It received Russian regulatory approval in August 2009; operations began on 27 August that year. In the beginning, the company advertised their base fares for RUB 250 (less than US$10) excluding taxes and fees. Andrew Pyne, CEO, voiced the strategy of the new company as "flying those Russians who haven't even seen the inside of an airplane in the past twenty years".

As of October 2011, Alfa Group controlled 51% of the stake, while US investment company Indigo Partners held the balance.

Avianova carried 1.3 million passengers in 2010, with an occupation of over 80%. By seat numbers flown it had become the second largest carrier at Sheremetyevo airport with 25% of total capacity, operating out of Terminal B. On monthly traffic statistics it ranked as fourth largest domestic carrier in Russia. It opened a second base at Krasnodar in May 2011, with operations to Sochi, Surgut, and St Petersburg, as well as Moscow. By June 2011, it had carried over 2 million passengers since launch at an average seat factor of nearly 80%.

=== Shareholder coup and bankruptcy ===
On the morning of 24 June 2011, representatives of the majority shareholder entered the airline's offices and removed the foreign management and some Russian managers and appointed a new leadership, in a move that CEO Andrew Pyne described as an "illegal coup". The airline's new management in turn accused the previous management of "managerial incompetence, flouting Russian law and inflicting severe financial damage on the company" and appointed Konstantin Teterin, former general manager of Red Wings Airlines, as deputy director general. However, Indigo did not recognize this designation, as it stated the move had "no legal basis". The Russian general director of the company, Vladimir Gorbunov, himself appointed by Pyne in the spring of 2008, stated that "from the very beginning of his co-operation with Avianova, Andrew Pyne demonstrated his unwillingness to work in compliance with Russian laws and emphasised his intention to work solely in accordance with his own rules."

The continued shareholder impasse over management changes and over funding for the company led to Avianova stopping ticket sales on 3 October as a prelude to stopping operations on 10 October 2011.

== Destinations ==
Even though the airline operated from Vnukovo Airport in its beginnings, it moved its hub to Sheremetyevo Airport's Terminal 1 on 28 March 2010.

Avianova served the following destinations before ceasing operations, as of April 2011:

- Russia
  - Anapa - Vityazevo Airport
  - Arkhangelsk - Talagi Airport
  - Astrakhan - Narimanovo Airport
  - Gelendzhik - Gelendzhik Airport
  - Kaliningrad - Khrabrovo Airport
  - Krasnodar - Pashkovsky Airport
  - Kurgan - Kurgan Airport
  - Moscow - Sheremetyevo International Airport Hub
  - Nizhnekamsk - Begishevo Airport
  - Perm - Bolshoye Savino Airport
  - Rostov-on-Don - Rostov-on-Don Airport
  - Saint Petersburg - Pulkovo Airport
  - Samara - Kurumoch Airport
  - Sochi - Adler-Sochi International Airport
  - Stavropol - Stavropol Shpakovskoye Airport
  - Surgut - Surgut Airport
  - Tyumen - Roschino International Airport
  - Ufa - Ufa International Airport
  - Ulyanovsk - Vostochny Airport
  - Volgograd - Volgograd International Airport
  - Yekaterinburg - Koltsovo Airport
- Ukraine
  - Simferopol - Simferopol Airport

=== Terminated before ceasing operations ===
- Russia – Kazan (suspended), Moscow-Vnukovo
