= Dobrolyot, Russia =

Settlement in Siberia, Russia

Coordinates: 52.2527°N 104.8299°E

Dobrolet or Dobrolyot is a settlement (Поселок) in Irkutsky District, on the Goloustnenskiy Trakt (Голоустненский тракт) located west of Lake Baikal in the Irkutsk Oblast, in eastern Siberia, Russia. It is included into the ru:Ушаковское муниципальное образование.
