= Sociedade de Aviação Ligeira =

Air taxi operator in Angola

- Industry: Transportation
- Founded: 1992
- Defunct: 2009
- Headquarters: Luanda, Angola
- Owners: TAAG, Endiama
- Number of employees: ~200

SAL - Sociedade de Aviação Ligeira was an air taxi operator based in Luanda, Angola.

== History ==
Founded in 1992, by a partnership between TAAG and Endiama, for light civil aviation in Angola, such as air taxi and other activities. It had 64 flight personnel, 65 maintenance personnel and 54 commercial and office support personnel.

== Fleet ==
As of January 2008 it had, according to its website:

- Beechcraft Super King Air these include 3 - 200 Super King Air and 2 - 350 Super King Air
- 4 Cessna 208 Caravan
- 1 Short SC.7 Skyvan

== Bases ==
- Benguela
- Cabinda
- Luanda
- Lubango
- Namibe (now Moçâmedes)
