= Northwest Airlines Flight 5 =

1941 commercial airplane crash in North Dakota

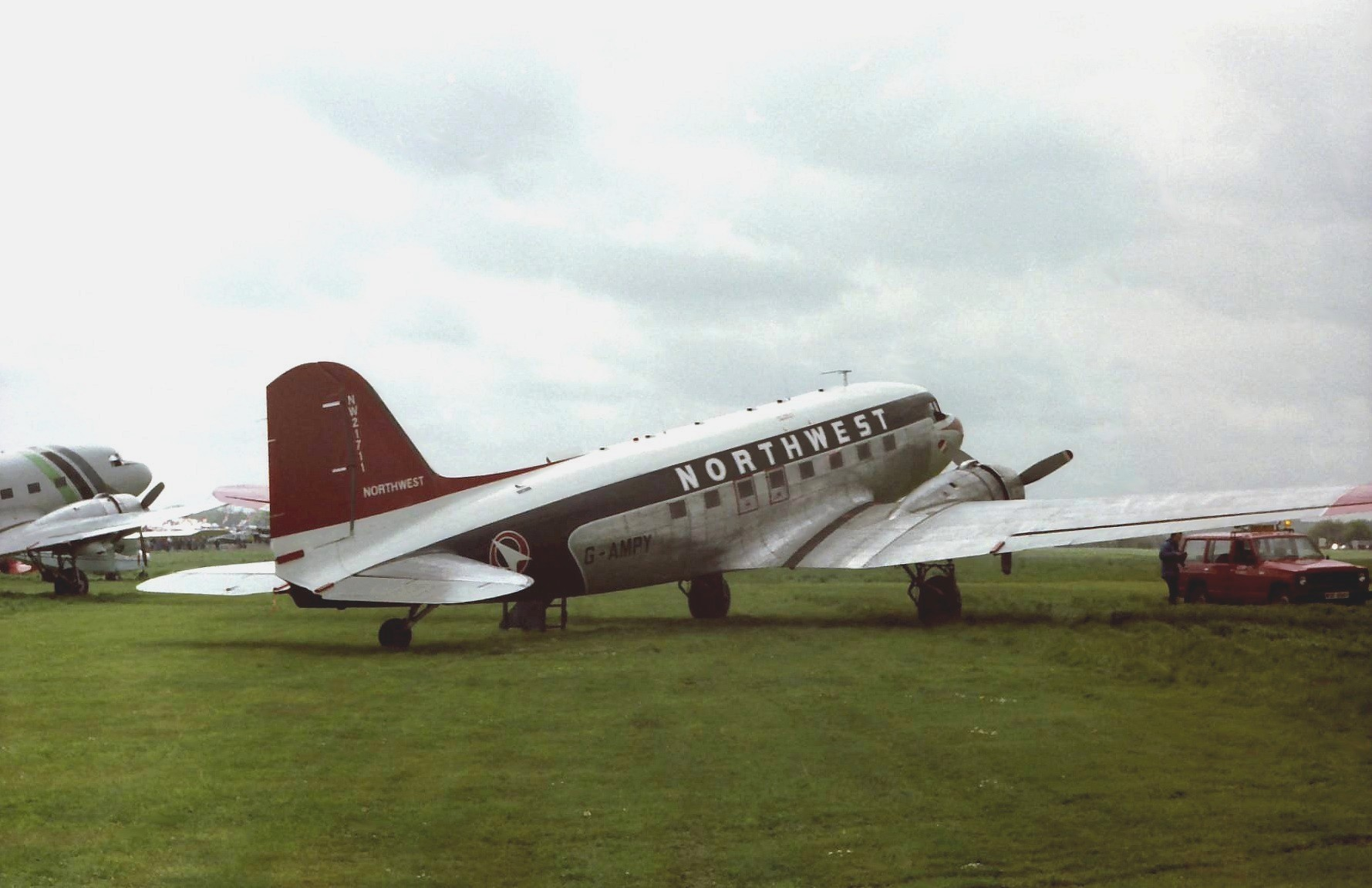
- A Douglas DC-3 painted in a Northwest Airlines livery, similar to the accident involved

Accident
- Date: October 30, 1941
- Summary: Crashed following icing conditions
- Site: Moorhead, Minnesota, United States; 46.91525°N 96.74242°W (approximate)

Aircraft
- Aircraft type: Douglas DC-3A-269
- Registration: NC21712
- Flight origin: Chicago
- 1st stopover: Madison, Wisconsin
- 2nd stopover: Minneapolis, Minnesota
- 3rd stopover: Fargo, North Dakota
- 4th stopover: Billings, Montana
- 5th stopover: Butte, Montana
- Last stopover: Spokane, Washington
- Destination: Seattle
- Passengers: 12
- Crew: 3
- Fatalities: 14
- Injuries: 1
- Survivors: 1 (Clarence F. Bates)

Northwest Airlines Flight 5 was a regularly scheduled, multiple stop flight from Chicago Municipal Airport to Boeing Field, Seattle. It had intermediate stops at Minneapolis; Fargo, North Dakota; Billings, Montana; Butte, Montana; and Spokane, Washington. On October 30, 1941, on the flight's leg between Minneapolis and Fargo, the Northwest Airlines Douglas DC-3A-269 operating the route crashed into an open field about 2 1/2 miles east of the Fargo airfield, just after 2:00 am local time. All 12 passengers and two of the three crew members aboard were killed.

== Investigation ==
The cause of the crash was determined to be an excessive buildup of ice on the aircraft's wings.

== Aftermath ==
Clarence Bates, the flight's captain and sole survivor, died a year later in an aviation accident in St. Paul, Minnesota, test flying a Consolidated B-24.
