= 1945 Resko Przymorskie Dornier Do 24 crash =

March 1945 plane crash in Resko Przymorskie, West Pomeranian Voivodeship, Poland

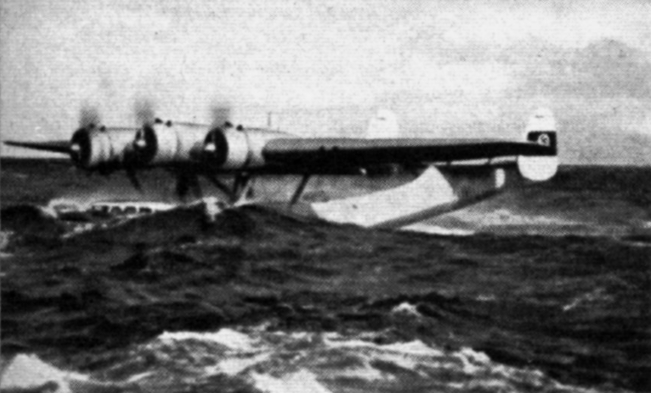
- A Dornier Do 24 similar to the accident aircraft.

Accident
- Date: March 5, 1945
- Summary: Undetermined, either overcrowding or possible shootdown
- Site: Resko Pryzmorskie (formerly Lake Kamper), West Pomeranian Voivodeship, German Pomerania; 54°8′32″N 15°22′37″E

Aircraft
- Aircraft type: Dornier Do 24T-3
- Operator: Luftwaffe
- Flight origin: Kamp, Pomerania, Nazi Germany (now part of Trzebiatów, West Pomeranian Voivodeship, Poland)
- Destination: Nazi Germany
- Occupants: 81
- Passengers: 77
- Crew: 4
- Fatalities: 80
- Survivors: 1

The 1945 Resko Przymorskie Dornier Do 24 crash was a military flight transporting mainly children that crashed on March 5, 1945. Shortly after takeoff from a German Air Force base in Kępa, the Dornier Do 24T-3 carrying four crew and 77 passengers crashed into Resko Przymorskie (formerly Lake Kamper), killing all but one on board.

== Accident ==
=== Background ===
As World War II drew to a close, many Germans attempted to escape the approaching Soviet Red Army. Fearing retaliation against atrocities committed by Nazi Germany, many citizens flocked to the air base at Lake Kamper seeking transport west. On March 5, 1945, flights were taking off from the base every fifteen minutes, carrying as many refugees as possible to Rügen and Schleswig-Holstein. Among the refugees were thousands of children who had been relocated to the countryside during the Kinderlandverschickung.

The aircraft involved in the crash was a German-made Dornier Do 24T-3, a seaplane with a capacity of about 16-24 passengers. On the day of the crash, four crew members and approximately 77 passengers boarded the plane.

=== Crash ===
As the plane took off, eyewitnesses on the banks of Lake Kamper watched in horror as the plane reached an altitude of about 260 feet before crashing into the water. Eyewitnesses described the plane as "howling" before "turning vertical" and "plunging stern first into the lake." Only one person escaped the wreck and survived the crash.

== Aftermath ==
The wreckage sank to the bottom of the lake. After the war, the lake and surrounding areas were taken over by Soviet forces. The lake itself became a restricted military area and the crash was kept secret for decades.

=== Cause ===
The cause remains formally undetermined, as an investigation has not taken place. Most people believe the plane crashed due to overcrowding, as it was massively above its weight limits on takeoff. Some believe that the unbelted children moved around in the plane which threw off the center of gravity, although others claim partitions in the plane would have made that unlikely.

There are also theories that the plane was shot down by Soviet troops. Eyewitnesses reported three Soviet tanks near the lake on the day of the crash.

=== Attempts to recover the wreckage ===
The area was used by Soviet troops until the 1990s. In 2001, the lake became accessible to the public. In 2009, divers found debris of the plane, but it was hopelessly stuck deep in the lake's mud. Pieces of the wreckage have been recovered, some apparently having pieces of Soviet shrapnel embedded within.

In a hangar near the lake, there is a small military museum called the Fort Rogowo Foundation for Military Studies. Its founder, Miroslaw Huryn, is convinced that the plane was shot down by the Soviets. Huryn believes that Soviet and Polish scouts visited the wreckage as early as 1987, and recovered the parts that Huryn now has at the foundation.

Fears of a Soviet conflict have kept Germans and Poles from making accusations about a shootdown. The costly and difficult task of fully recovering the plane means the wreck will likely remain in the lake for the foreseeable future. Huryn estimates recovery and conservation would cost around €200,000.

The bodies of the dead children remain in the lake with the wreckage. An entrepreneur from Baden-Württemberg provided funds for a mapping of the location of the wreck in 2012, which lies 2,600 feet from the north bank of the lake and covers an area of 60 square feet.

== Commemorations ==
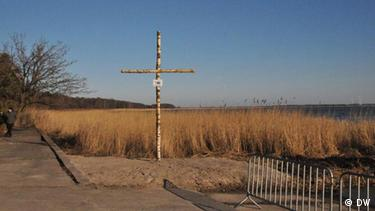
A cross on the banks of Lake Kamper.

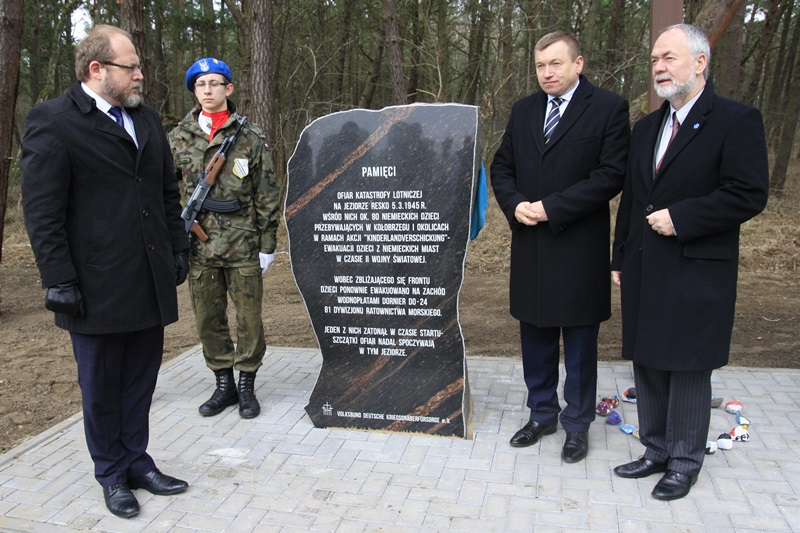
Plaque commemorating the victims, unveiled in 2016.

In 2012, on the 67th anniversary of the crash, a commemoration for the victims was held for the first time. A cross was placed on the banks of the lake to commemorate the 80 fatalities. Clergy from various denominations also spoke at the memorial.

In 2016, a ceremony commemorated the 71st anniversary of the crash and a plaque for the victims was unveiled.
