= Vietnam Airlines Flight 815 =

1997 aviation accident in Cambodia

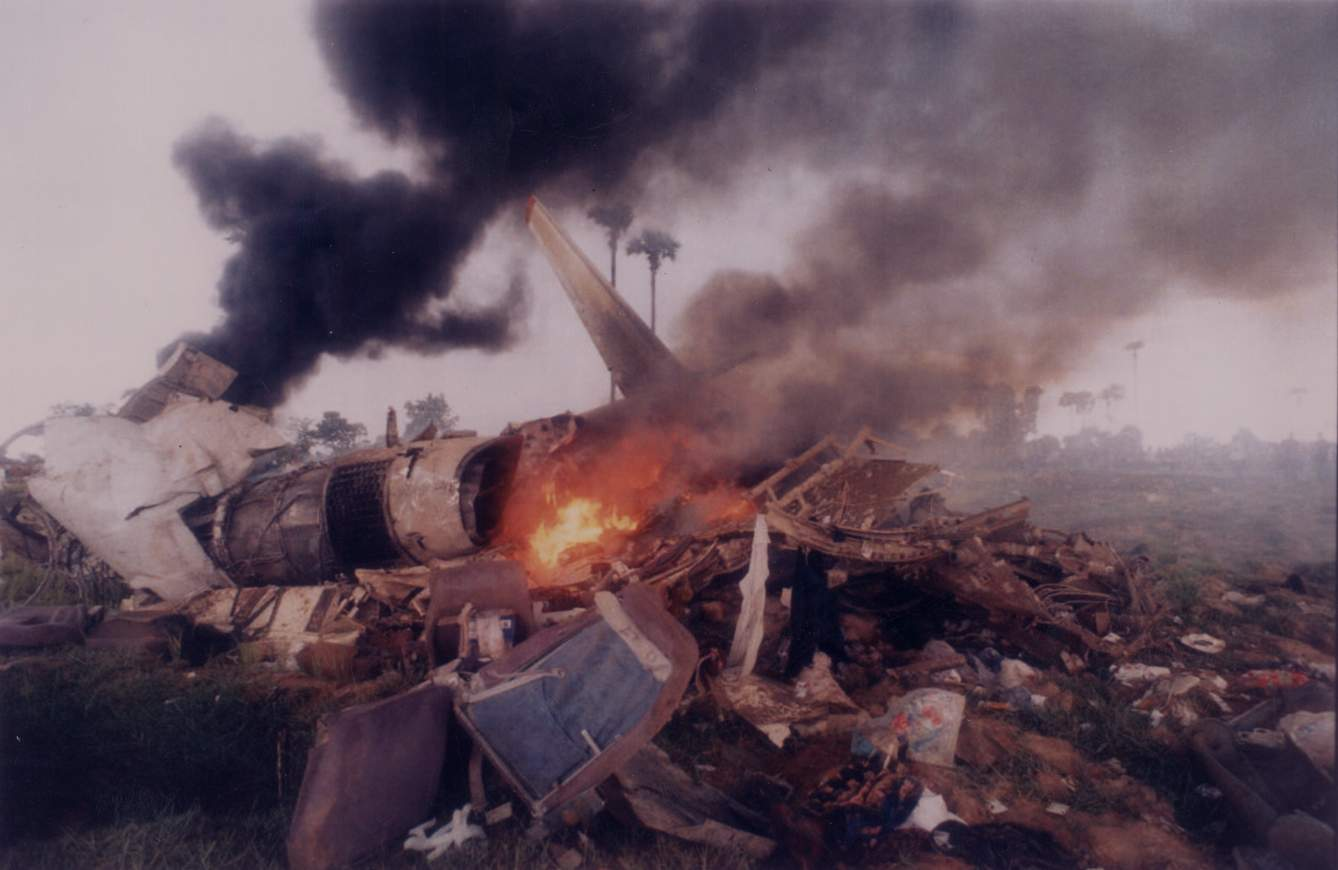
- Wreckage of the aircraft

Accident
- Date: 3 September 1997
- Summary: Controlled flight into terrain during approach
- Site: Near Pochentong International Airport, Phnom Penh, Cambodia; 11.5464°N 104.8440°E

Aircraft
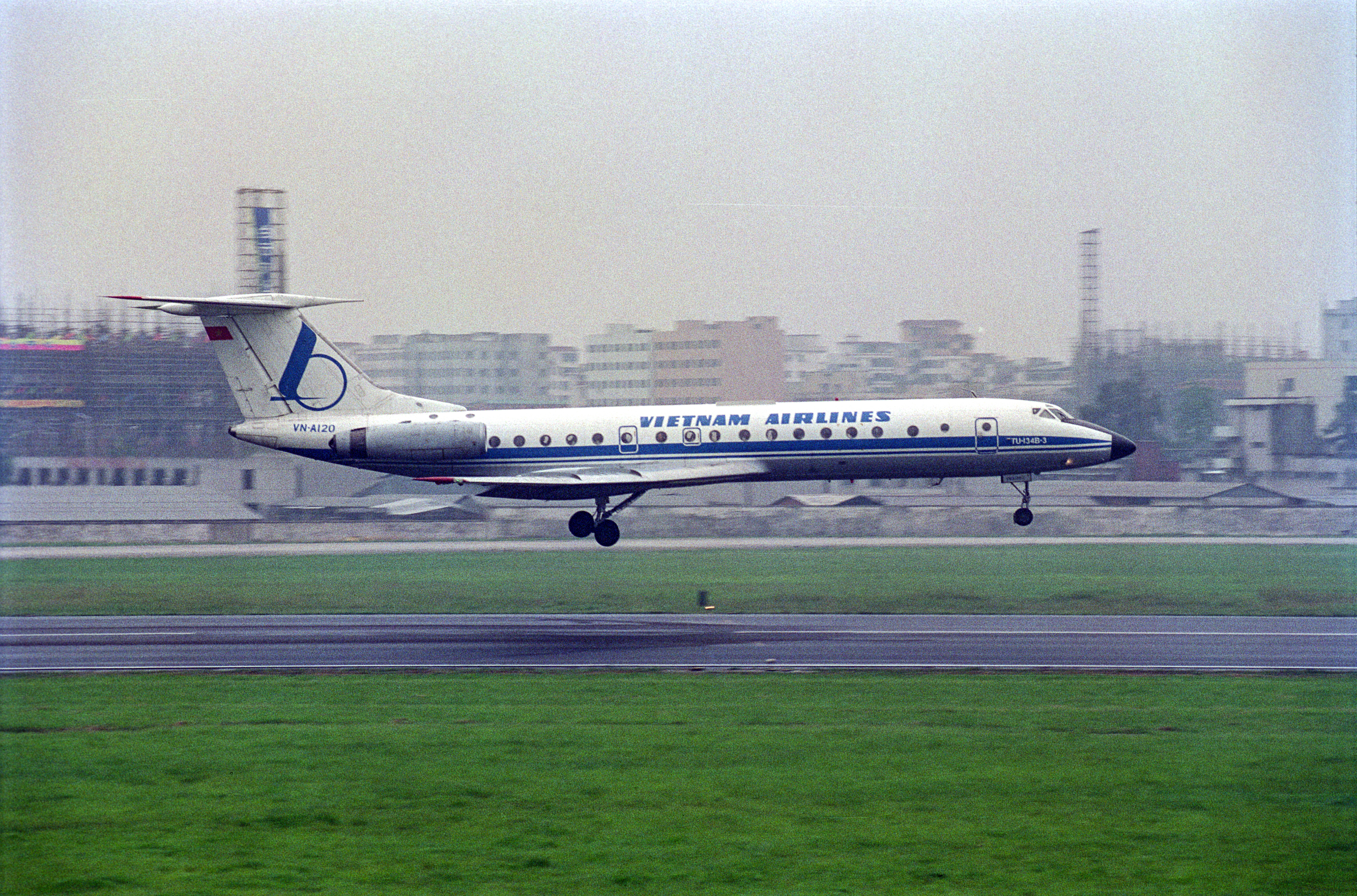
- VN-A120, the aircraft involved in the accident, pictured in May 1997
- Aircraft type: Tupolev Tu-134B-3
- Operator: Vietnam Airlines
- IATA flight No.: VN815
- ICAO flight No.: HVN815
- Call sign: VIETNAM AIRLINES 815
- Registration: VN-A120
- Flight origin: Tan Son Nhat International Airport, Ho Chi Minh City, Vietnam
- Destination: Pochentong International Airport, Phnom Penh, Cambodia
- Occupants: 66
- Passengers: 60
- Crew: 6
- Fatalities: 65
- Injuries: 1
- Survivors: 1

Vietnam Airlines Flight 815 was a scheduled Vietnam Airlines flight which crashed on final approach to Pochentong International Airport in Cambodia on 3 September 1997. The Soviet-built Tupolev Tu-134 airliner crashed approximately 800 metres (2,600 ft; 870 yd) short of the Phnom Penh runway, killing 65 of the 66 people on board. As of February 2024, it remains the deadliest accident in Cambodian history. Upon investigation, the crash was determined to have been the result of improper actions by the pilot.

== Aircraft ==
The aircraft was manufactured in 1984 registration number VN-A120, serial number 66360.

== Accident ==
Flight 815 departed Ho Chi Minh City around 1 o'clock in the afternoon for the 45-minute flight to Phnom Penh. The aircraft was approaching the Phnom Penh airport from the east in heavy rain. According to acting airport director and investigating committee chief Sok Sambour, the plane was supposed to be flying at 14,000 feet (4,300 m) when it began its approach, but was at 10,000 feet (3,000 m) when it reached the range of Pochentong's Non-Directional Beacon (NDB).

The airport previously had a VOR/DME, but it had been looted the previous July. Because of this the pilots had to use the non directional beacon (NDB) located 5 kilometres (3.1 mi; 2.7 nmi) west of the airport to get a general fix of the area, and had to keep descending until they could make visual contact with the airfield. As a result, the frequency of aborted landings had increased over the rainy season. The runway lights had also been looted, but were reportedly replaced and illuminated at the time.

Once in range of the NDB, the pilot asked the control tower for permission to land at 5,000 feet (1,500 m). The control tower agreed, but requested the pilot remind the control tower often of its approach, due to the heavy weather. As the flight approached the airport it was at 3,000 feet (910 m) when the pilot again asked for permission to land, stating that he could not find the runway. The pilot was given permission to drop to 2,000 feet (610 m) and was told to keep in contact.

After a moment the control tower inquired if the pilot had found the runway, to which the pilot replied that he could not see the runway. The control tower then informed the pilot that the wind direction was changing. The pilot was on an eastern approach to runway 23; the tower requested that the pilot instead approach runway 5 from the west. Continuing on the eastern approach would cause the pilot to attempt to land downwind. The pilot acknowledged the request, and had no further contact with the control tower.

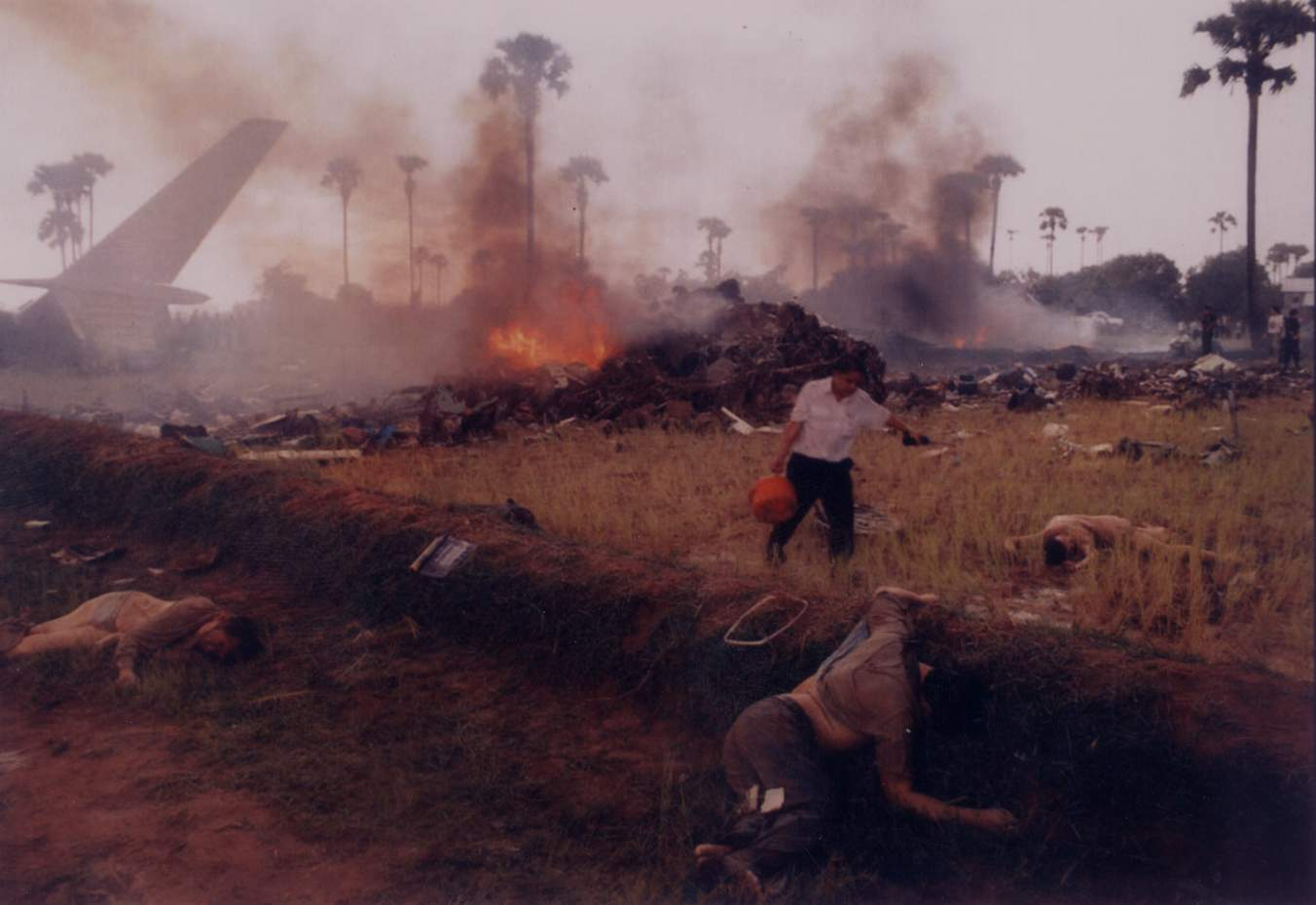
Another angle of the crash site with bodies could be seen near the wreckage

Two minutes later, Flight 815 was spotted still approaching from the east. The plane kept descending until it was 200 feet (61 m) above the ground. The cockpit voice recorder (CVR) showed at that time the first officer, Hoang Van Dinh (49), asked the captain, Pham Van Tieu (59), to pull up and abort the landing, as they still did not have visual of the runway. The captain said he would wait a little. The plane descended to 100 feet (30 m), still with no visual of the runway, at which point the first officer and the flight engineer, again asked the captain to abort the landing. It was too late, however; four seconds later the left wing of the plane struck a palm tree. At that time they were not in line with the runway, having veered left across the military side of the airport. Striking the tree caused one engine to stop. The right wing skimmed across a house. The plane tilted to the left and hit the ground at 270 kilometres per hour (150 kn; 170 mph).

Eyewitnesses state that there were flames in the aeroplane's tail after it struck the tree. One witness states he saw an emergency door open and could see passengers crowded at the door, but none jumped before the airplane struck the ground. The aircraft then slid 200 yards (600 ft; 180 m) through several dry rice paddies before exploding at around 1:40 pm.

== Victims ==
Nationality	Passengers	Crew	Total
Taiwan	22	0	22
South Korea	21	0	21
Vietnam	2	6	8
Hong Kong	4	0	4
Cambodia	3	0	3
Canada	2	0	2
China	2	0	2
Australia	1	0	1
Japan	1	0	1
Macau	1	0	1
United Kingdom	1	0	1
Total	60	6	66

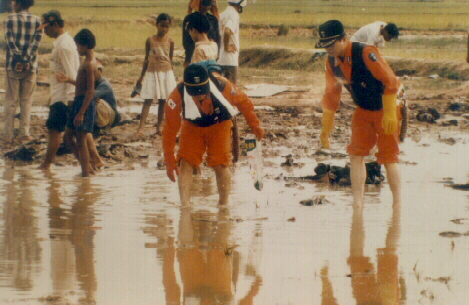
Rescue workers at the crash site

Most of the passengers were from South Korea and Taiwan. The 22 Taiwanese nationals were mainly coming for business reasons, though two or three were travelling to Cambodia for their weddings. Six of the 21 South Koreans were a medical team donating equipment to Phnom Penh University.

Five people were still alive after the crash and were taken to the hospital. Initially two survived; Chanayuth Nim-anong, a 14-month-old boy from Thailand who sustained broken legs, and a four-year-old Vietnamese boy who received head injuries. Nim-anong was the sole survivor after the Vietnamese boy succumbed to his injuries. The plane skimmed the top of a house and damaged it before landing on an oxcart road. One wing decapitated two cows. Initial looting of the scene was done by military and police. Once the bodies were removed, villagers looted much of the remaining personal belongings and parts of the aircraft including the flight recorders.

== Investigation ==
Cambodia's government offered a reward for the return of the missing flight recorders. The three flight recorders, the CVR, the flight data recorder (FDR), and the quick access recorder (QAR), were all obtained from the villagers for US$10, $200, and $1500, respectively.

Initially Vietnam Airlines and Phnom Penh airport workers argued over who was at fault. The airline stated that the navigational equipment at Phnom Penh airport was out of order and its control tower gave the pilots incorrect information prior to takeoff. However, the report by Cambodia's Aircraft Accident Investigation Committee determined that the cause of the crash was pilot error. The report concluded that the principal factors were:

- the captain did not follow the instructions of the approach controller in the control tower and he made the decision to continue to descend in very bad weather
- the captain ignored the advice of his first officer and flight engineer
- the captain's insistence in engaging the auto pilot even after passing the minimum height at which one should decide whether or not to land
- the captain's impulsive actions to continue his approach in the conditions revealed "his psychological unreadiness to abort the landing and go around"

The captain continued his landing descent from an altitude of 6,600 feet (2,000 m) to 100 feet (30 m) even though the runway was not in sight, and ignored pleas from his first officer and flight engineer to turn back. When the aircraft hit the trees, the captain finally realized the runway was not in sight and tried to abort the approach; the flight engineer pushed for full power, but the aircraft lost control and veered right; the right engine then failed, making it impossible to gain lift. The aircraft subsequently stalled and crashed.

Examinations of the aircraft and records determined that there was no mechanical problem and all maintenance was up to date. The crew all had valid licenses and medical certificates.
