= Kuban Airlines =

Airline ceased operations in Russia

Kuban Airlines Авиакомпания Кубань
IATA	ICAO	Call sign
GW	KIL	AIR KUBAN
- Founded: 1992
- Ceased operations: 2012
- Operating bases: Krasnodar; Moscow-Vnukovo
- Fleet size: 7
- Destinations: 17
- Headquarters: Krasnodar, Krasnodar Krai, Russia
- Key people: Sergey Mordvintsev (MD)

OAO Kuban Airlines (Russian: ОАО «Авиакомпания Кубань») was an airline based in Krasnodar, Russia. It operated domestic flights within Russia, as well as international charters. Its main base was Krasnodar International Airport. Its name comes from Kuban Province in southern Russia. On 11 December 2012 Kuban Airlines ceased operations due to financial difficulties.

== History ==
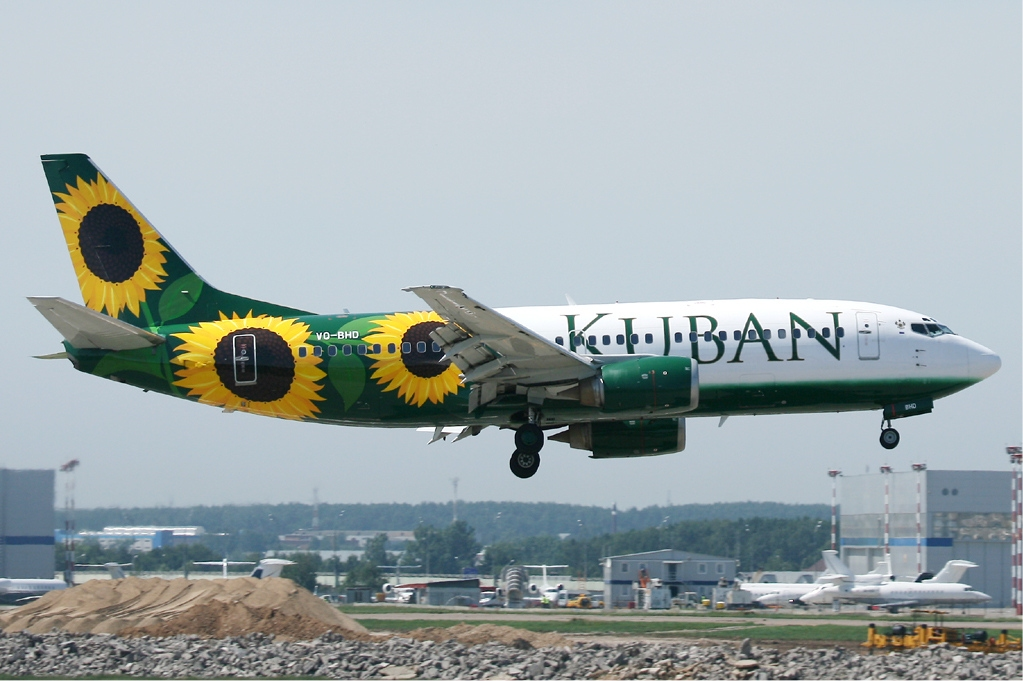
A Kuban Airlines Boeing 737-300 landing at Vnukovo International Airport, Russia. (2011)

Kuban Airlines was founded as a division of Aeroflot in 1932. It became an independent company in 1992, owned by the state (51%) and the airline employees (49%).

In February 2010, Kuban Airlines introduced a new livery to its first Boeing 737-300 aircraft. The new livery was a dark green background with sunflowers running from the back half of the fuselage and up the tail. The engines were also coloured in dark green.

On 18 May 2010, Kuban Airlines announced that they had taken delivery of their first of four ordered Boeing 737-300s. The airline also announced that beginning in 2011 their Yakolev aircraft were to be retired and replaced by new Antonov An-148 or Boeing 737-700 aircraft.

=== Merger with Sky Express ===
In September 2011, it was announced that Russian low-cost carrier Sky Express was to be merged into Kuban Airlines. On 29 October 2011, the two airlines merged, bringing Airbus A319 and Boeing 737 aircraft into the Kuban Airlines fleet.

== Fleet ==
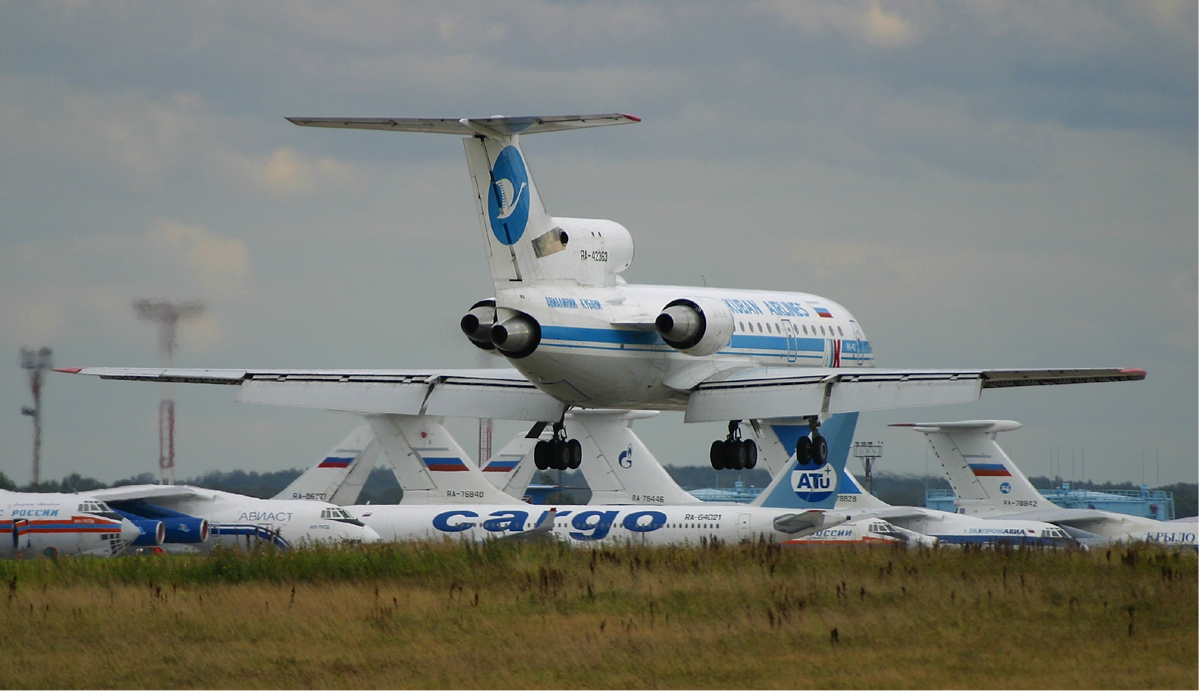
A Kuban Airlines Yakovlev Yak-42D landing at Domodedovo International Airport, Russia. (2003)

The Kuban Airlines fleet consisted of the following aircraft in November 2012:

Kuban Airlines fleet
Aircraft	In fleet	Orders	Passengers			Notes
Aircraft	In fleet	Orders	C	Y	Total	Notes
Airbus A319-100	3	0	0	156	156	Charter
Boeing 737-300	2	0	12	112	124	
Boeing 737-500	2	0	–	–	–	
Sukhoi Superjet 100	—	12	TBA			Was planned to enter service in 2012

=== Previously operated ===
Prior to November 2012, the airline has also operated:

- Antonov An-24
- Tupolev Tu-154M
- Yakovlev Yak-42 – Retired on 1 November 2012

== Accidents and incidents ==
- On 26 December 1993, Kuban Airlines Flight 5719, operated by an Antonov An-26b, crashed near Gyumri Shirak International Airport in Armenia during an attempted go-around. The plane had been overloaded, causing it to stall and crash. Of the 36 people on board, only one survived the crash.

== See also ==
- Babyflot
