= Krasnodar International Airport =

Airport in Russia

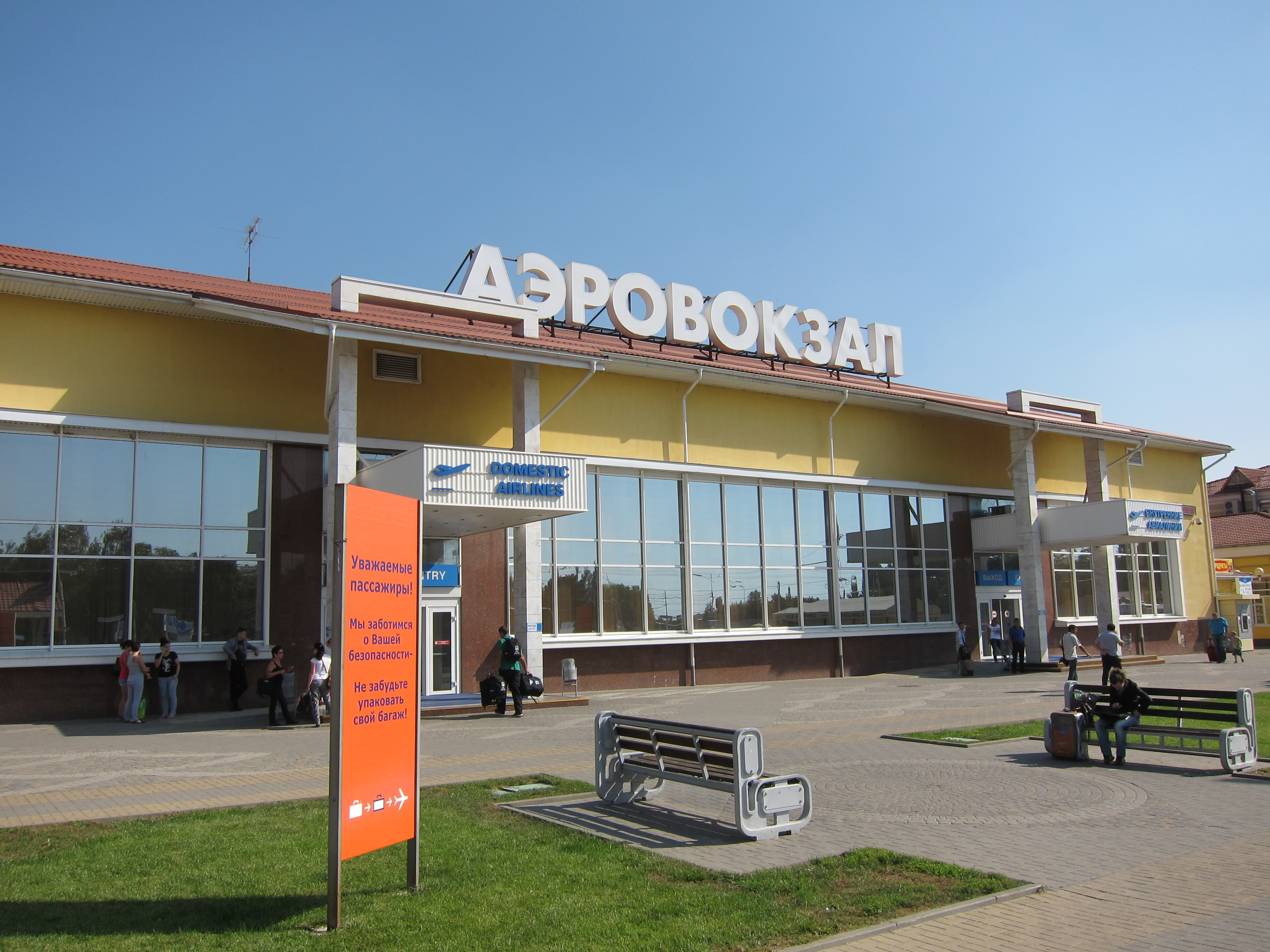
- IATA: KRR; ICAO: URKK

Summary
- Airport type: Public
- Operator: JSC Krasnodar International Airport
- Serves: Krasnodar
- Location: Krasnodar, Russia
- Opened: 1934
- Elevation AMSL: 118 ft (36 m)
- Coordinates: 45°02′05″N 39°10′14″E
- Website: krr.aero

Map
- Location of the airport in Krasnodar Krai Location of the airport in Russia Location of the airport in Europe

Runways
Direction	Length		Surface
Direction	ft	m	Surface
05R/23L	9,835	3,000	Concrete
05L/23R	7,218	2,200	Asphalt
05C/23C	7,874	2,400	Concrete

Statistics (2018)
- Number of passengers: 4,160,053
- Sources: Russian Federal Air Transport Agency (see also provisional 2018 statistics)

Krasnodar International Airport (Russian: Международный аэропорт Краснодар), also known as Pashkovsky Airport (Russian: Аэропорт Пашковский; IATA: KRR, ICAO: URKK) is the main airport serving the southern Russian city of Krasnodar. It is an international airport, and is located 12 km east of the centre of Krasnodar city.

Krasnodar International Airport is the 9th busiest airport in Russia. In 2015, it handled more than 3.1 million passengers.

The airport is a part of Basel Aero airport managing holding. Until the end of 2012 it was the operating hub of Kuban Airlines.

== Characteristics ==
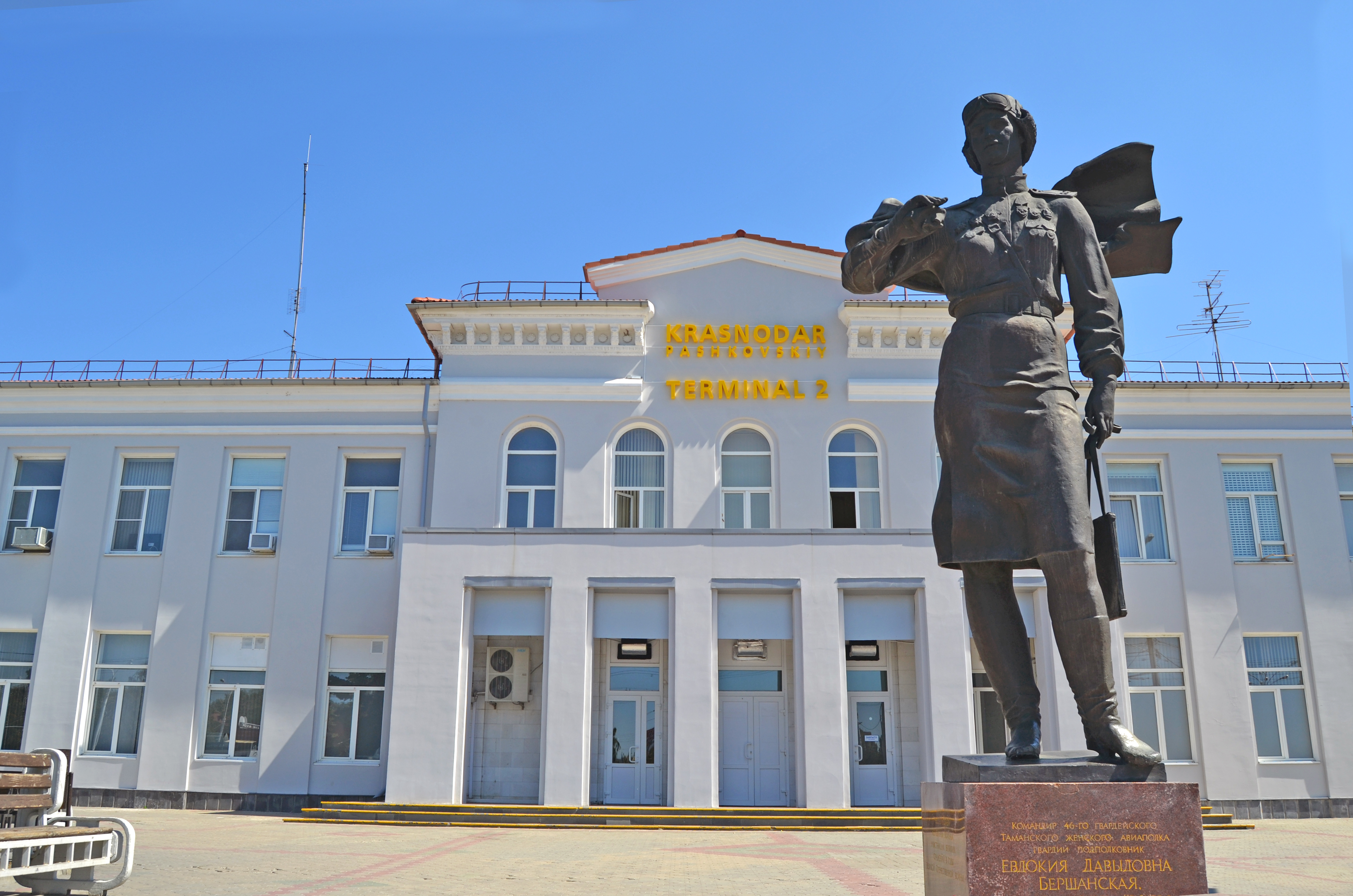
International terminal

Krasnodar International Airport has three runways that can accommodate modern aircraft, such as Boeing-737 (excluding Boeing-737-900), Boeing 757 (with limitations), Airbus A319, Airbus A320, Embraer 195, as well as helicopters of all types.

The airport's capacity is 500 passengers per hour for domestic flights and 200 passengers per hour for international flights.

In the terminal building, there are VIP and CIP lounges, as well as shops, cafes, pharmacies. Wi-Fi access is also provided.

== History ==
In 1932, Krasnodar United Air Group was established. Later that year seven Po-2 Aerial Pest Control Agency aircraft landed near the central office of Pashkovsky state farm. In late 1932, the Agency was reorganized. It was used as a basis for the formation of Pashkovsky air base, which in late 1933 was moved to the aerodrome used by the present-day Krasnodar airport.

In 1934, the air base was reorganized into the 218 Civil Aviation Pashkovsky Special Air Group. The majority of Po-2 aircraft were re-equipped into passenger carriers. Scheduled passenger flights were performed from Krasnodar to Maikop, Sochi, Anapa, etc.

In 1941–1945, during World War II, the aircraft of the Special Air Squadron of Krasnodar Airline transported ammunition and POL to the battle-front and carried out medevac missions.

In 1946, the airport started accommodating Li-2 aircraft; and since 1948, Il-12 aircraft.

In 1960, construction of the first concrete runway was completed. Flights performed by Il-18 aircraft commenced in Krasnodar airport. Construction of a two-story passenger terminal was also completed later. Scheduled passenger and cargo flights to domestic destinations performed using Аn-10, Il-18, and Аn-12 aircraft.

In 1962, scheduled passenger service with Тu-124 aircraft was launched.

In 1964, Krasnodar United Air Group within the structure of the North Caucasian Civil Aviation Authority was formed. Later that year, the Group acquired its own fleet of Аn-24 aircraft.

In 1981, Yak-42 aircraft was put into operation. In 1984, the second concrete runway was put into operation.

In 1993, Krasnodar United Air Group within the structure of the North Caucasian Civil Aviation Authority was restructured into OJSC Kuban Airlines, which comprised an air carrier and an airport.

In 2006, OJSC Kuban Airlines was restructured through the spinoff of two of its entities, namely OJSC Krasnodar International Airport and OJSC Kuban Air Transport Territorial Agency. 20 December is the birthday of Krasnodar International Airport.

In 2007, Russian Transportation Ministry included the airport in its list of 12 international hubs on the territory of the Russian Federation.

Before the Russian invasion of Ukraine, the airport was of strategic importance to Russia as its southern air gates. It was used by over 30 airlines flying to 62 destinations (including 17 international destinations).

In 2022, with the launch of the Russian invasion of Ukraine on February 24, all civilian flights to and from the airport were suspended. The airport officially reopened on 11 September 2025. While the first flight, arriving from Moscow, is scheduled for 17 September 2025.

== Reconstruction ==
Krasnodar International Airport is currently undergoing revamp that is divided into two parts: construction of a new 60,000 m^{2} airport building, scheduled to be completed in 2017, and the modernization of the aerodrome infrastructure.

The latter includes runway revamp, construction of a ramp, engineering installations and upgrade of the equipment to provide safe, uninterrupted, and high-quality aircraft handling.

Basel Aero managing the project of the new terminal building has picked up Dutch NACO, one of the world's leading independent airport consultancy and engineering firms, to develop the new airport's master plan. According to NACO, annual passenger traffic of the new terminal will reach 10 million passengers in 2030.

Within the period of design and construction of the new Krasnodar airport, the area of the existing terminal is to be expanded by 8 200 sq m. As a result, the airport's capacity will increase up to 1,700 passengers per hour. In August 2013, reconstruction of the international terminal was commenced. According to the design, the number of check-in counters will increase to 8, immigration control counters to 10, and an additional baggage carousel is to be installed. Besides, a children playground will be constructed within the terminal building.

The Krasnodar airport reconstruction project involves the domestic terminal building. The renovated terminal buildings are to be put into operation in late 2014.

== Airlines and destinations ==
Airlines	Destinations
Aeroflot	Antalya, Dubai–International, Gyumri, Hurghada, Istanbul, Kazan, Krasnoyarsk–International, Moscow–Sheremetyevo, Novosibirsk, Saint Petersburg, Sharm El Sheikh, Ufa, Yekaterinburg, Yerevan
Air Anka	Seasonal charter: Antalya
AlMasria Universal Airlines	Seasonal charter: Sharm El Sheikh
azimuth	Antalya, Dubai–Al Maktoum, Istanbul, Makhachkala, Mineralnye Vody, Perm, Samarqand, Sochi, Tashkent, Tbilisi, Tel Aviv, Yerevan
Azur Air	Seasonal charter: Antalya, Nha Trang, Phuket
Alrosa	Novosibirsk
Centrum Air	Tashkent
FlyOne	Yerevan
IrAero	Seasonal charter: Antalya
Nesma Airlines	Seasonal charter: Sharm El Sheikh
Nordstar Airlines	Chelyabinsk, Norilsk
Nordwind Airlines	Kazan
Pobeda	Istanbul, Kazan, Moscow–Vnukovo, Saint Petersburg, Yekaterinburg
Red Sea Airlines	Seasonal charter: Sharm El Sheikh
Red Wings Airlines	Batumi, Makhachkala, Sharm El Sheikh, Tbilisi
Rossiya Airlines	Krasnoyarsk–International, Saint Petersburg
S7 Airlines	Moscow–Domodedovo, Novosibirsk
SCAT Airlines	Şymkent
Smartavia	Moscow–Sheremetyevo, Saint Petersburg
Southwind Airlines	Seasonal: Antalya
Tailwind Airlines	Seasonal charter: Antalya
Ural Airlines	Dushanbe, Chelyabinsk, Moscow–Domodedovo, Yekaterinburg
Utair	Moscow–Vnukovo, Surgut, Ufa
Uzbekistan Airways	Namangan, Tashkent

== Statistics ==
=== Annual traffic ===
Annual passenger traffic
Year	Passengers	% Change
2010	2,086,000	Steady
2011	2,511,000	▲20.4%
2012	2,599,100	▲3.5%
2013	2,853,394	▲9.8%
2014	3,421,000	▲19.9%
2015	3,128,248	▼8.5%
2016	3,002,121	▼4.0%
2017	3,498,126	▲16.5%
2018	4,173,000	▲19.3%

== See also ==
- List of the busiest airports in Russia
- List of the busiest airports in Europe
- List of the busiest airports in the former USSR
