= Koepcke =

Koepcke or Köpcke is a surname. Notable people with the name include:

- Juliane Koepcke (born 1954), German mammalogist
- Karl-Heinz Köpcke (1922–1991) German television presenter
- Maria Koepcke (1924–1971), German ornithologist
- Hans-Wilhelm Koepcke (1914–2000), German ornithologist and herpetologist
- Wolfgang Köpcke (born 1948), German athlete
