= Panguana =

Biological research station

Coordinates: 9.6137°S 74.9356°W

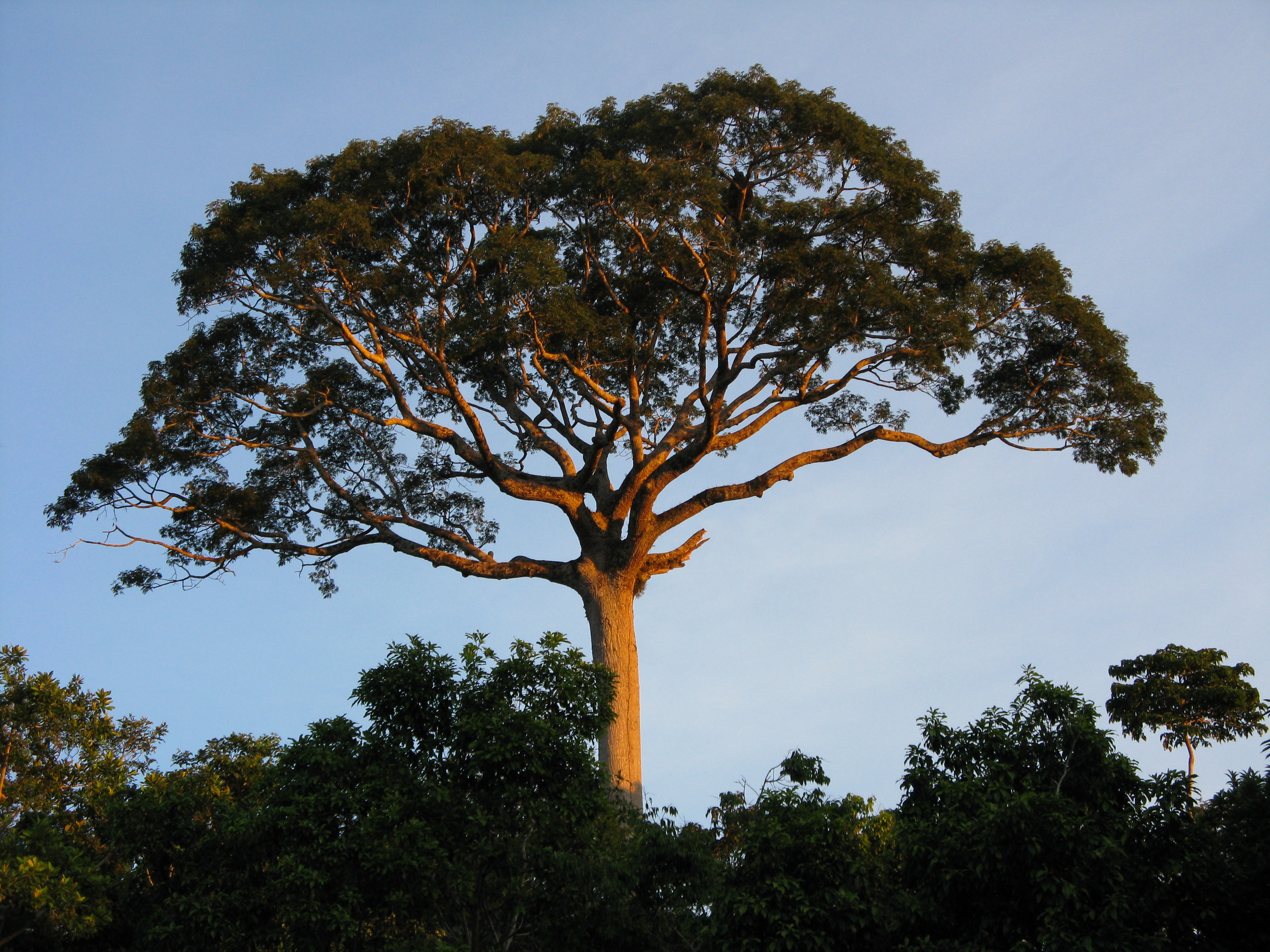
The kapok tree (Ceiba pentandra) just behind the station - Panguana's landmark

Panguana is a biological research station, founded in 1968 and since 2011 it is also a private conservation area extending over almost 10 km^{2} of tropical primary forest in Peru.

== Geography and Biodiversity ==
Panguana is located in the low land rainforest at the western foothill of the El Sira mountain range east to the Andes. It was named after a common native tinamou species (Crypturellus undulatus). The station is located at 230 m asl next to the Rio Yuyapichis, a tributary to the Rio Pachitea. It can be accessed by crossing the Pachitea at the village of Yuyapichis and a 1 1/2h foot march over pastures and through forests or a 2h boat ride upstream the Rio Yuyapichis.

The research area's terrain is slightly hilly and contains various water bodies, non-flooded terra firme, swamp, alluvial and secondary forests, and also some plantations and pastures in the western border areas.

In the east, the area borders the territory of the indigenous people of the Asháninka. Their area stretches to the Sira mountains, which are about 40 km away and almost 2500 m high. It is only extensively used and largely covered by primary rainforest. About 4 km east of the station is a central village of the people with a school, where the Asháninka children from the area go to. Panguana supports this school to teach the local people the value of their rainforest.

The annual average temperature is 24.5 °C, but temperatures of over 40 °C or more are quite frequent during the dry season (May - September). Annual precipitation amounts to 2,000 to 3,000 mm with around 180 rain days. The rainy season usually extends from October to April, followed by a dry season. Within the forest, there is a constant humidity of about 90% throughout the year.

Large parts of the Panguana conservation area are still covered by primary Amazon rainforest, and thus show a very high biodiversity, which has been explored only fragmentarily. So far, 500 tree species and 16 species of palm trees were identified on an area of 2 square kilometers, and over 670 different vertebrates, including 360 bird, 115 mammalian, 78 reptile, 76 amphibian and 34 fish species were documented. In the 1980s, the head of the station studied the 52 bat species found in Panguana. Meanwhile, 57 species are known. For comparison, there are only about 27 bat species documented for Europe, and only around 254 breeding birds live all over Germany with an area of around 357,000 km^{2}. The insect fauna is extraordinarily rich in diversity and only known in the beginning. Manfred Verhaagh from the State Museum of Natural History in Karlsruhe was able to find about 500 species of ants in Panguana, which is one of the highest number of species recorded worldwide. About 250 butterfly species have been found. Moths and small butterflies that have so far hardly been explored are estimated to be between 10,000 and 12,000 species.

== Research station ==
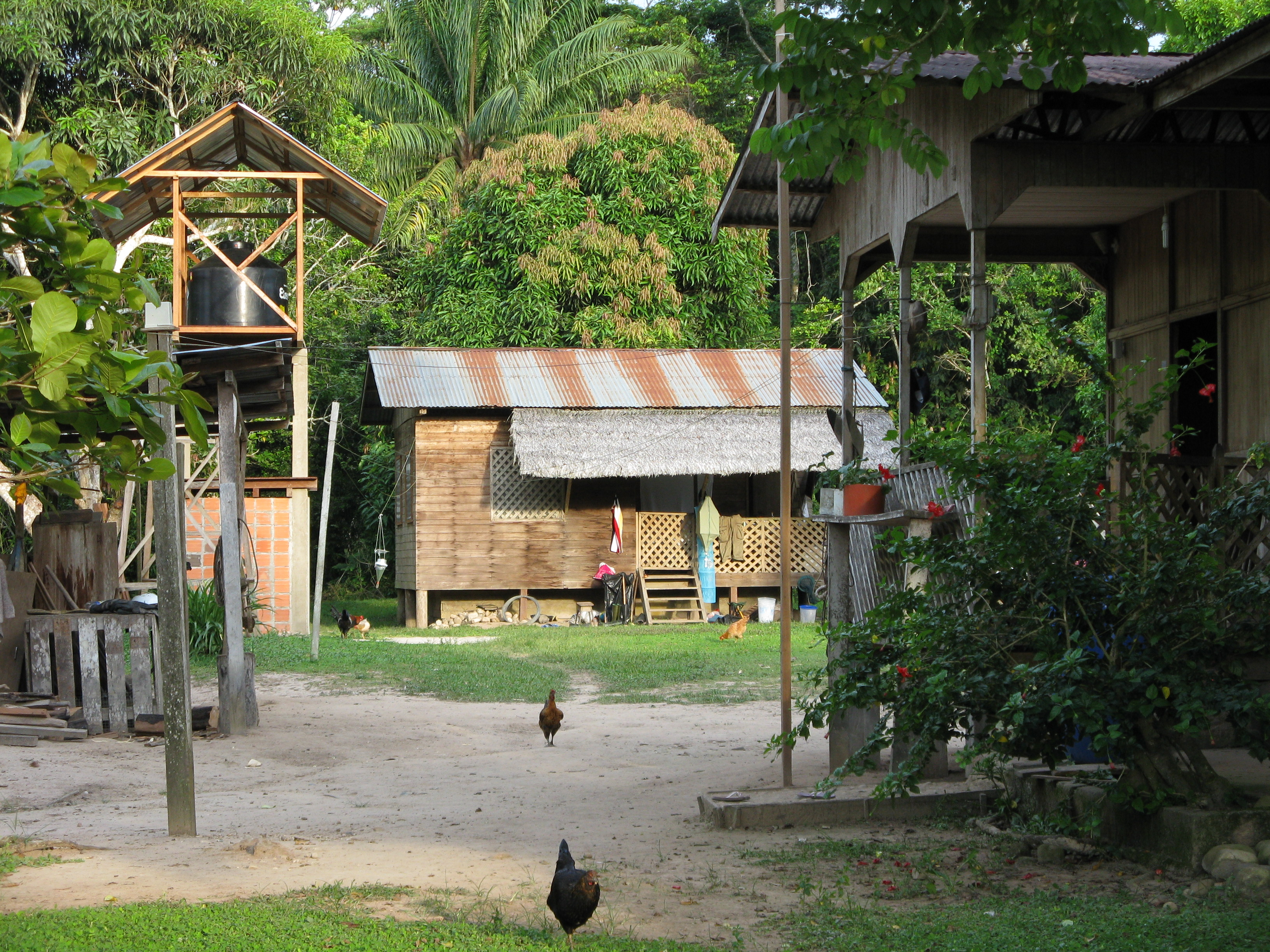
View of the station in 2008, meanwhile new buildings were added.

The aim of the research station Panguana is to explore the biodiversity of flora and fauna, and study their ecological relationships. In addition, a unique ecosystem is protected and preserved.

Through continuous scientific work, the diverse flora and fauna can be explored, systematically assigned and the different ways of life and biological relationships documented. Numerous diploma and doctoral studies were made in Panguana and many international expeditions were held there. To date, more than 180 scientific publications have been published on the research results in this area. After consultation with the head of the station, Juliane Diller, scientists can work at the research station Panguana.

For better observation, over 20 km of paths were cut into the jungle. The station has three guest houses with a laboratory for about 14 people, a round house for dining and workshops, several boats and a photovoltaic system for electricity and the operation of a well pump. By now, even an internet connection via wifi is available. It is guarded and supervised by the owner of the neighboring farm Carlos Vásquez "Moro" Módena, and his family.

== History ==
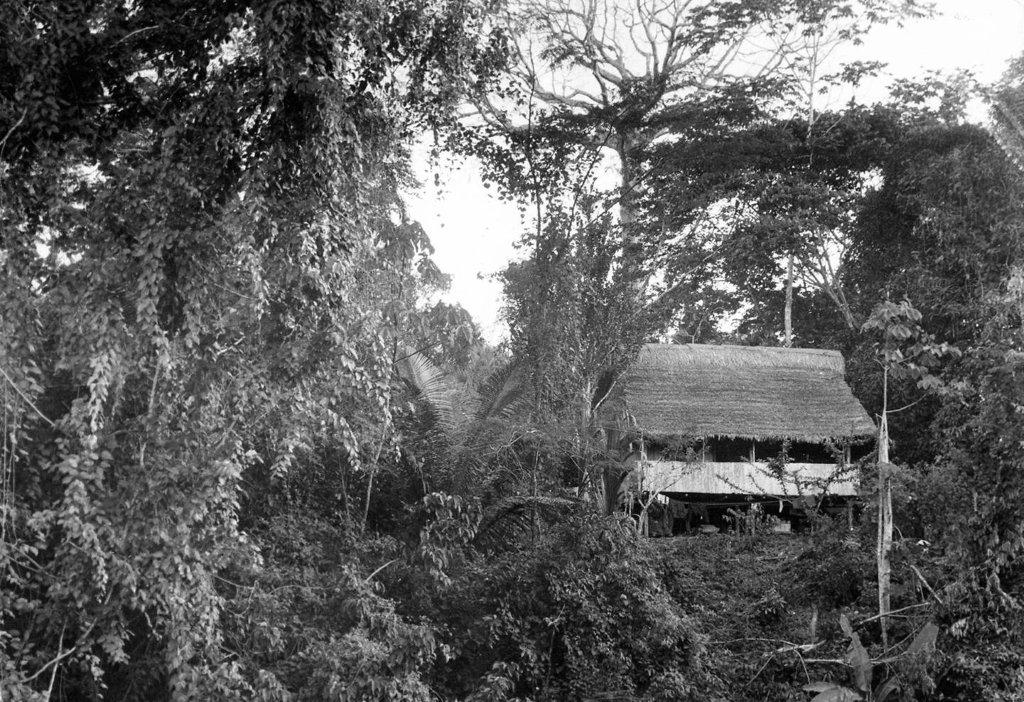
The Panguana station in 1971

The biological research station Panguana was founded in 1968 by the biologists Maria Koepcke and Hans-Wilhelm Koepcke and was originally only designed for a period of 5 years of field research. Originally a wooden cabin which had been abandoned by locals served as accommodation. The cabin stood on stilts, with a roof of palm leaves (see picture) and an additional kitchen hut next to it. Later it was replaced by a larger house and another was added. Since 2000, their daughter, Juliane Diller, has been running the station. In her absence, the manager, Moro, is her representative. Since 2003, there has been a co-operation between the Zoological State Collection Munich, where Diller works, and the Natural History Museum in Lima, Peru. Through sponsoring by the "Hofpfisterei" in Munich, the area of the station has been enlarged several times over the past few years by the acquisition of adjacent lands.

In the 1970s, Hans-Wilhelm Koepcke unsuccessfully tried to promote Panguana as a nature conservation area and in 1972 the area became an official scientific research area (zona de estudio científico del Ministerio de Agricultura, Direccíon forestal, de caza y Tierras). Finally at the end of 2011, the newly created Peruvian Ministry of Environment declared Panguana as a private conservation area (Area de Conservación Privada) in order to protect the area permanently from clearing, hunting and colonization.

== Literature ==
- Juliane Koepcke und Beate Rygiert: Als ich vom Himmel fiel. Malik, München 2011, ISBN 978-3-8902-9389-9.
