= Miracles Still Happen =

- I miracoli accadono ancora
- Directed by: Giuseppe Maria Scotese
- Written by: Giuseppe Maria Scotese
- Story by: Juliane Koepcke
- Produced by: Paul Maslansky (uncredited); Ninki Maslansky
- Cinematography: Giorgio Tonti
- Edited by: Giuliana Trippa
- Music by: Marcello Giombini
- Distributed by: Brut Productions
- Release date: 19 July 1974 (West Germany)
- Running time: 87 minutes
- Country: Italy
- Language: English

Miracles Still Happen (Italian: I miracoli accadono ancora) is a 1974 Italian film directed by Giuseppe Maria Scotese. It features the story of Juliane Koepcke, the sole survivor of 92 passengers and crew, in the 24 December 1971 crash of LANSA Flight 508 in the Peruvian rainforest.

== Cast ==
- Susan Penhaligon as Juliane Koepcke
- Paul Muller as Hans-Wilhelm Koepcke
- Graziella Galvani as Maria Koepcke

== Production ==
Filmed on location in Peru (exterior scenes) and in Rome, Italy at Cinecittà Studios (interior scenes) on a 12-week shooting schedule from October 9 to December 28, 1972.

== See also ==
- Wings of Hope
- The One, similar story about Aeroflot Flight 811
