= Susan Penhaligon =

English actress and writer (born 1949)

- Born: 3 July 1949 (age 77); Manila, Philippines
- Education: Webber Douglas Academy of Dramatic Art
- Occupation: Actress
- Years active: 1971–present
- Known for: Bouquet of Barbed Wire; Emmerdale; A Fine Romance; The Land That Time Forgot
- Partner: Duncan Preston (1997–present)
- Children: 1
- Relatives: David Penhaligon (cousin)

Susan Penhaligon (born 3 July 1949) is a British actress and writer known for her role in the drama series Bouquet of Barbed Wire (1976), and for playing Helen Barker in the sitcom A Fine Romance (1981–1984).

She appeared in the soap opera Emmerdale as Jean Hope in 2006, and her film appearances include Under Milk Wood (1971); No Sex Please, We're British (1973); The Land That Time Forgot (1974); The Uncanny (1977); Paul Verhoeven's Soldier of Orange (1977) and as Lucy Westenra in Count Dracula (1977). She has also had a substantial stage career.

Tagged the "British Bardot" in the 1970s, she was described by Clive Aslet in The Daily Telegraph as "the face of the decade".

== Early life and education ==
Penhaligon is the eldest child of Bill, an engineer for the Shell Oil Company and Jean Penhaligon who ran a bed and breakfast. Born in Manila, where her father was working, Penhaligon returned with her family to the UK aged six and spent her formative years living in St Ives and Falmouth in Cornwall, and considers herself Cornish. Aged 11, she was sent to boarding school in Bristol where her acting ambitions were encouraged. She has two brothers and a sister in the US. After her parents divorced, her father went to live in San Francisco. She is a cousin of David Penhaligon, a former Liberal member of parliament in Cornwall.

While training at the Webber Douglas Academy of Dramatic Art, Penhaligon shared a flat with Peter Hammill; she is mentioned in the lyrics of the Van der Graaf Generator song "Refugees" and the Hammill song "Easy to Slip Away".

== Acting career ==
=== Theatre ===
Penhaligon's first appearance in the theatre was playing Juliet in Romeo and Juliet at the Connaught Theatre, Worthing in a two weekly repertory company.

In the West End she appeared in a 1987 production of Three Sisters at the Albery Theatre. In 1982, she played a leading part in The Real Thing at the Strand Theatre, Aldwych (now called the Novello). She appeared in The Maintenance Man at the Comedy Theatre in 1987, and played Curley’s Wife in a 1984 production of Of Mice and Men at the Mermaid Theatre. She has toured the UK extensively, appearing in productions of The Constant Wife (Richmond Theatre, 2004), Mrs. Warren's Profession (Richmond Theatre, 2009), Death Trap (Theatre Royal, Norwich, 2002), Agatha Christie's Verdict (Floral Pavilion Theatre, 2011), Dangerous Obsession with Simon Ward (Theatre Royal, Bath, 1989), and Lord Arthur Saville's Crime by Oscar Wilde (Richmond Theatre, 2005).

She was in Time and the Conways, Lower Depths and The Cherry Orchard, and played a leading part in Arthur Miller's Broken Glass at the West Yorkshire Playhouse in Leeds.

In the Edinburgh Festival Fringe she appeared in the premiere of Dario Fo's Abduction Diana and she appeared in a critically acclaimed production of Misery at the King's Head Theatre and Keeping Up With the Joans with her friend Katy Manning.

=== Television ===
Her television credits include Public Eye (1975) (as Tuesday Simpson, a lesbian, would-be seductress of Julian Bradley, played by Ronald Lewis), Count Dracula (1977) with Louis Jourdan, Bouquet of Barbed Wire, Upstairs Downstairs, Tales of the Unexpected, Bergerac, Remington Steele, Wycliffe, Doctor Who, The Taming of the Shrew by the BBC Shakespeare series, Heart of the Country, A Kind of Loving, A Fine Romance, three episodes of Doctors, three episodes of Casualty, and UK soap Emmerdale (in which she played Jean Hope).

Being Cornish, there was one particular role Penhaligon badly wanted and auditioned for, that of the miner's daughter and servant girl Demelza in Poldark; she lost out to Welsh actress Angharad Rees.

=== Film ===
Penhaligon had roles in films such as Say Hello to Yesterday (1970); Private Road (1971); Under Milk Wood (1971) as Mae Rose Cottage; No Sex Please, We're British (1973); The Land That Time Forgot (1974); House of Mortal Sin (1976); Nasty Habits (1977); Paul Verhoeven's Soldier of Orange (1977) as a British military officer; The Uncanny (1977); Leopard in the Snow (1978); Patrick (1978); The Masks of Death (1984) and Top Dog (2014). She also played the role of the sole survivor of LANSA Flight 508, Juliane Koepcke in the film Miracles Still Happen (1974), directed by Giuseppe Maria Scotese.

== Writing career ==
Penhaligon's novel For the Love of Angel, published in 2008 by Truran Books, is set in Cornwall in the 1880s.

== Filmography ==
=== Film ===
Year	Title	Role	Notes
1971	Say Hello to Yesterday	Girl on train	uncredited
1971	Under Milk Wood	Mae Rose Cottage	
1971	Private Road	Ann Halpern	
1973	No Sex Please, We're British	Penny Hunter	
1974	The Last Chapter	Penny	
1974	Miracles Still Happen	Juliane Koepcke	
1974	The Land That Time Forgot	Lisa Clayton	
1976	House of Mortal Sin	Jenny Welch	
1977	Nasty Habits	Felicity	
1977	The Uncanny	Janet	
1977	Soldier of Orange	Susan	
1977	Count Dracula	Lucy Westenra	
1978	Leopard in the Snow	Helen James	
1978	Patrick	Kathy Jacquard	
1980	The Taming of the Shrew	Bianca Minola	
1984	The Masks of Death	Miss Derwent	
1999	Junk	Mrs. Brogan	
2013	Patrick: Evil Awakens	Woman on Radio	Cameo; voice
2014	Top Dog	Sal	
2018	The Dead Room	Joan	
2021	Into the Night	Mary Richards	
2022	Long Way Back	Angie	

=== Television ===
Year	Title	Role	Notes
1970	BBC Play of the Month	Maid	Episode: "The Rivals"
1971	ITV Sunday Night Theatre	Judy	Episode: "Pandora"
1971	Play for Today	Barbara	Episode: "O Fat White Woman"
1971	Upstairs, Downstairs	Mary Stokes	Episode: "A Cry for Help"
1971	Thirty-Minute Theatre	Marjory	Episode: "Jenkins"
1972	Pardon My Genie	Joyce	Episode: "If Opportunity Knocks: I'm Out"
1972	Doctor Who	Lakis	Serial: "The Time Monster"
1972	The Visitors	Gisela	All 5 episodes
1972	Country Matters	Ianthe Forrest	Episode: "Craven Arms"
1973	The Regiment	Annie Hassock	Episode: "Troopship"
1973	Late Night Theatre	Barbara	Episode: "Barbara's Wedding"
1973	Once Upon a Time		Episode: "Ishmael"
1973	Love Story	Carol	Episode: "My Brother Peter"
1974	BBC Play of the Month	Isabella	Episode: "The Changeling"
1974	Seven Faces of Woman	Christine	Episode: "Polly Put the Kettle On"
1975	Public Eye	Tuesday Simpson	Episode: "The Fall Guy"
1975	Play for Today	Lucy Bagley	Episode: "Brassneck"
1976	Shades of Greene	Julia	Episode: "Mortmain"
1976	Bouquet of Barbed Wire	Prue Sorenson	All 7 episodes
1978	BBC2 Play of the Week	Secretary	Episode: "Fearless Frank"
1978	Return of the Saint	Emma Bartlett	Episode: "The Imprudent Professor"
1979	The Dick Francis Thriller	Carol Tomes	Episode: "Horsenap"
1980	Ramp Ahead	Suzy Wilkins	TV film
1981–1984	A Fine Romance	Helen	23 episodes
1982	A Kind of Loving	Donna Pennyman	4 episodes
1982	Tales of the Unexpected	W.P.C. Mary Bryan	Episode: "Decoy"
1983	Tales of the Unexpected	Mary Ashburn	Episode: "Hit and Run"
1983	Heather Ann	Heather Ann Lewis	TV film
1984	Remington Steele	Margaret Cable	Episode: "Maltese Steele"
1987	Heart of the Country	Natalie Harris	All 4 episodes
1989	Bergerac	Ruth Gardiner	Episode: "Natural Enemies"
1991	Trouble in Mind	Julia Charlesworth	All 9 episodes
1992	Casualty	Hattie Kent	Episode: "Act of Faith"
1993	Teenage Health Freak	Jane	Episode: "#2.4"
1994	Wycliffe	Mariah Penrose	Episode: "The Scapegoat"
1997	The Ruth Rendell Mysteries	Beth Fyfield	Episode: "Thornapple"
1999	Junk	Mrs Brogan	TV film
2001	Doctors	Carla Halliday	Episode: "Kissing Babies"
2002	A Touch of Frost	Pam Hartley	2 episodes
2003	Casualty	Leila Morrison	Episode: "Getting Through"
2006	Emmerdale	Jean Hope	13 episodes
2010	Doctors	Angela Linkson	Episode: "Double Bogey"
2012	Doctors	Daphne Morris	Episode: "Out Damned Spot"
2013	Casualty	Anne Pitney	Episode: "Rock and a Hard Place"
2016	Doctors	June Collerton	Episode: "Clues to My Heart"
2018	The Dead Room	Joan	TV film
2021	Doctors	Alice Price	Episode: "Sleeping with Ghosts"
2024	Doctors	Emily Chandak	Episode: "Protest"
2026	Beyond Paradise	Maud Dingleby	Episode: "4.4"
