= Puerto Inca District =

Coordinates: 9.3811°S 74.9643°W

Puerto Inca
- District
- Interactive map of Puerto Inca
- Country: Peru
- Region: Huánuco
- Province: Puerto Inca
- Founded: February 2, 1956
- Capital: Puerto Inca

Government
  - Mayor: Melanio Leonidas Nuñez Vera

Area
  - Total: 2,071.18 km^{2} (799.69 sq mi)
- Elevation: 175 m (574 ft)

Population (2005 census)
  - Total: 8,845
  - Density: 4.271/km^{2} (11.06/sq mi)
- Time zone: UTC-5 (PET)
- UBIGEO: 100901

Puerto Inca District is one of five districts of the province Puerto Inca in Peru. On December 24 1971, LANSA sole Lockheed Electra crashed in the district. All but one of the people on board were killed.

== Climate ==
Climate data for Puerto Inca, elevation 212 m (696 ft), (1991–2020)
| Month | Jan | Feb | Mar | Apr | May | Jun | Jul | Aug | Sep | Oct | Nov | Dec | Year |
|---|---|---|---|---|---|---|---|---|---|---|---|---|---|
| Mean daily maximum °C (°F) | 31.0 (87.8) | 30.6 (87.1) | 30.8 (87.4) | 30.9 (87.6) | 30.7 (87.3) | 30.6 (87.1) | 30.9 (87.6) | 32.3 (90.1) | 32.7 (90.9) | 32.2 (90.0) | 31.5 (88.7) | 31.2 (88.2) | 31.3 (88.3) |
| Mean daily minimum °C (°F) | 22.2 (72.0) | 22.2 (72.0) | 22.0 (71.6) | 21.8 (71.2) | 21.3 (70.3) | 20.5 (68.9) | 20.0 (68.0) | 20.3 (68.5) | 21.1 (70.0) | 22.0 (71.6) | 22.3 (72.1) | 22.3 (72.1) | 21.5 (70.7) |
| Average precipitation mm (inches) | 302.4 (11.91) | 294.3 (11.59) | 256.3 (10.09) | 158.8 (6.25) | 124.0 (4.88) | 79.0 (3.11) | 77.1 (3.04) | 60.4 (2.38) | 108.0 (4.25) | 176.7 (6.96) | 246.1 (9.69) | 283.4 (11.16) | 2,166.5 (85.31) |
Source: National Meteorology and Hydrology Service of Peru
