= Mayantuyacu =

Healing retreat in Puerto Inca Province, Peru

Coordinates: 8.82°S 74.73°W

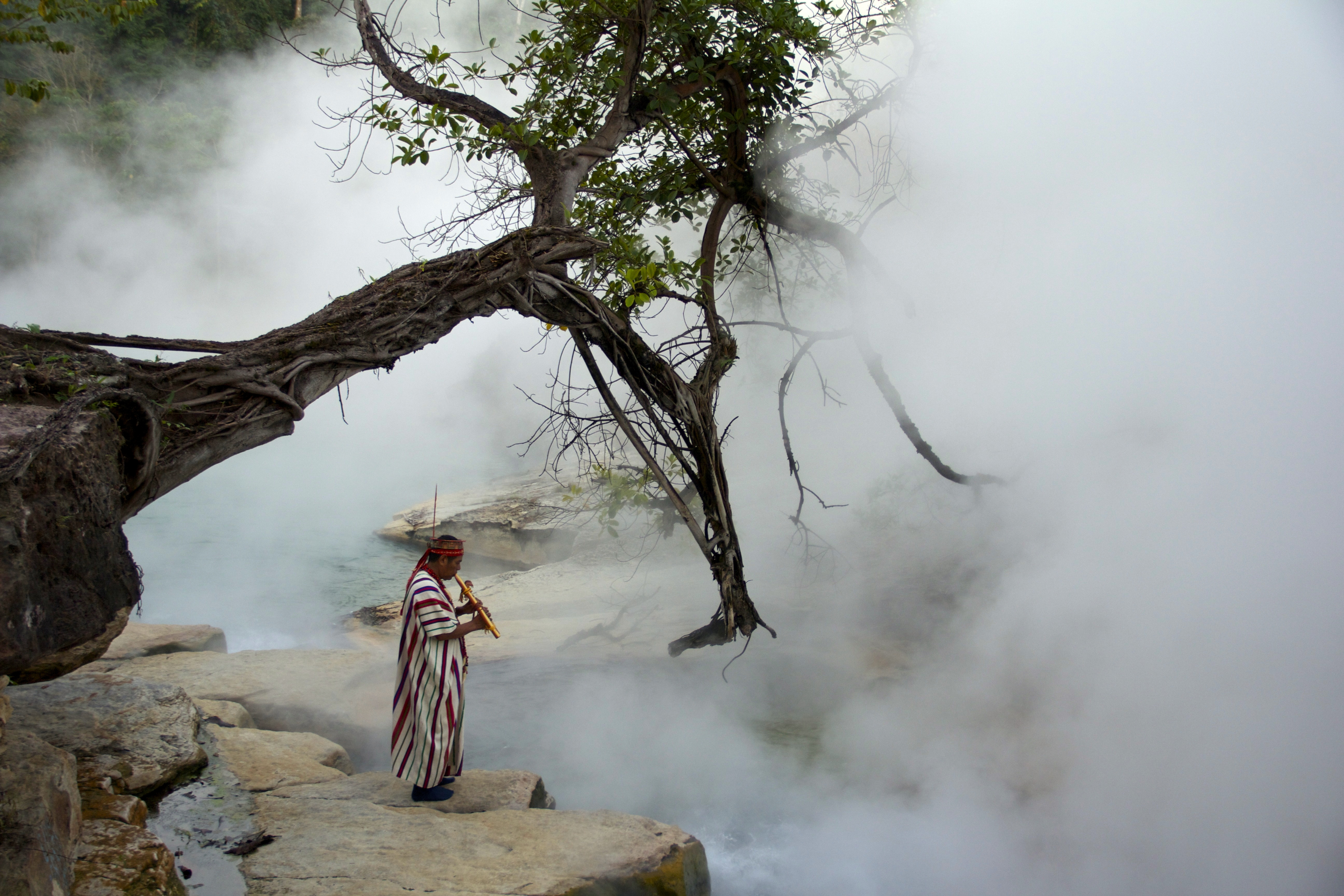
Shanay-Timpishka hot stream

Mayantuyacu is a healing retreat in Puerto Inca Province, Peru. Located near Pucallpa, the Mayantuyacu sanctuary covers 180 hectares of Amazon rainforest. In Asháninka language, Mayantuyacu means "the water and the air". According to the local guides, "Mayantu" refers to the spirit of the jungle, and "Yacu" refers to the spirit of the water.

The retreat was established by Juan Flores Salazar, an Ashaninka traditional healer (vegetalismo). He was born into a family of traditional healers; he states that he established Mayantuyacu to practice plant therapy and pass on the traditional knowledge to future generations. His healing techniques involve use of tobacco, bark, natural fragrances and ayahuasca.

Mayantuyacu has many natural hot springs. The area also has the Shanay-Timpishka hot stream, which has been described as "The Boiling River" by geoscientist Andrés Ruzo in a book by the same name.
