= Puerto Inca province =

Coordinates: 9°40′31″S 75°27′01″W

Puerto Inca
- Province
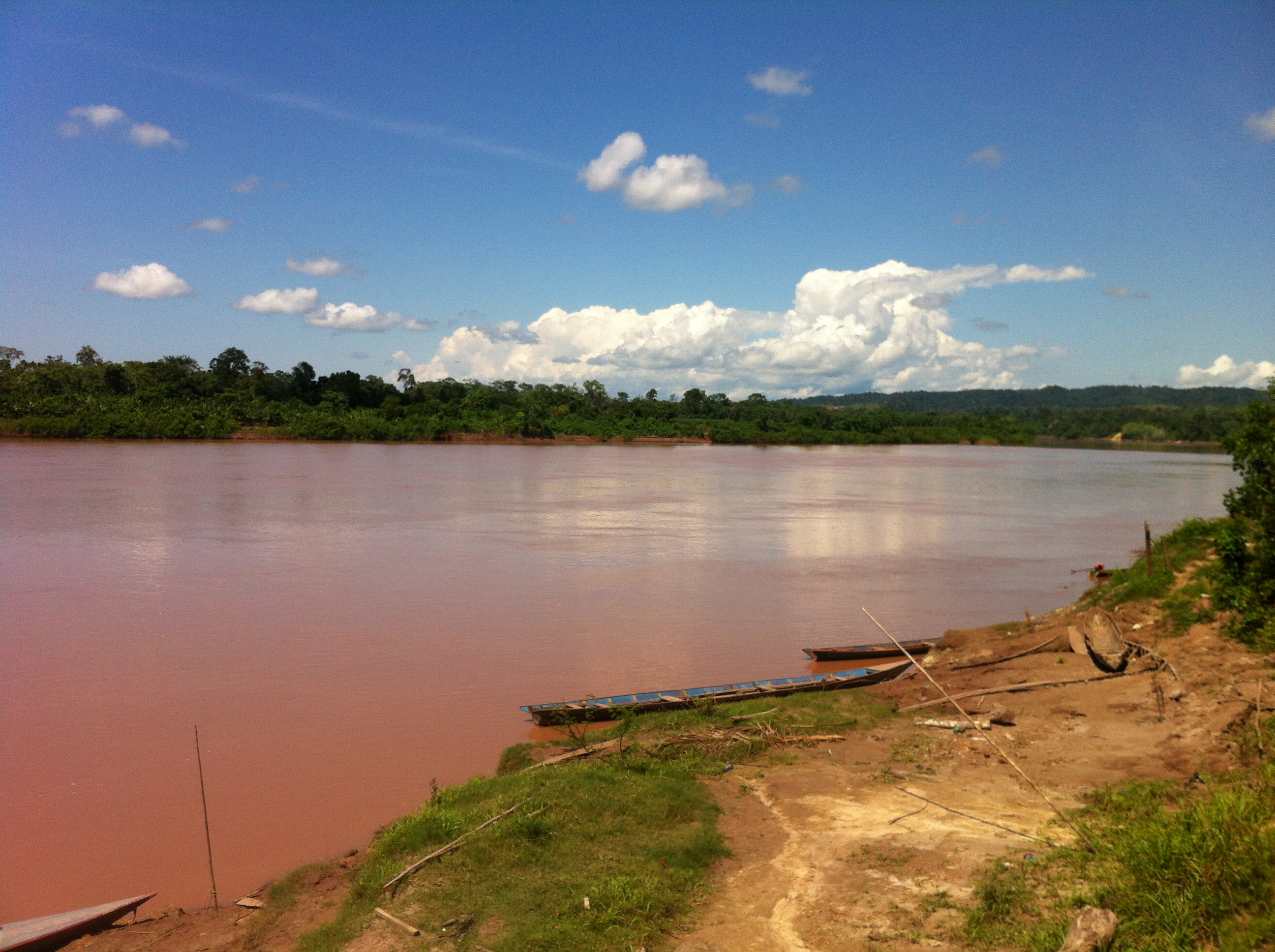
- Pachitea River near Nueva Honoria, Honoria District

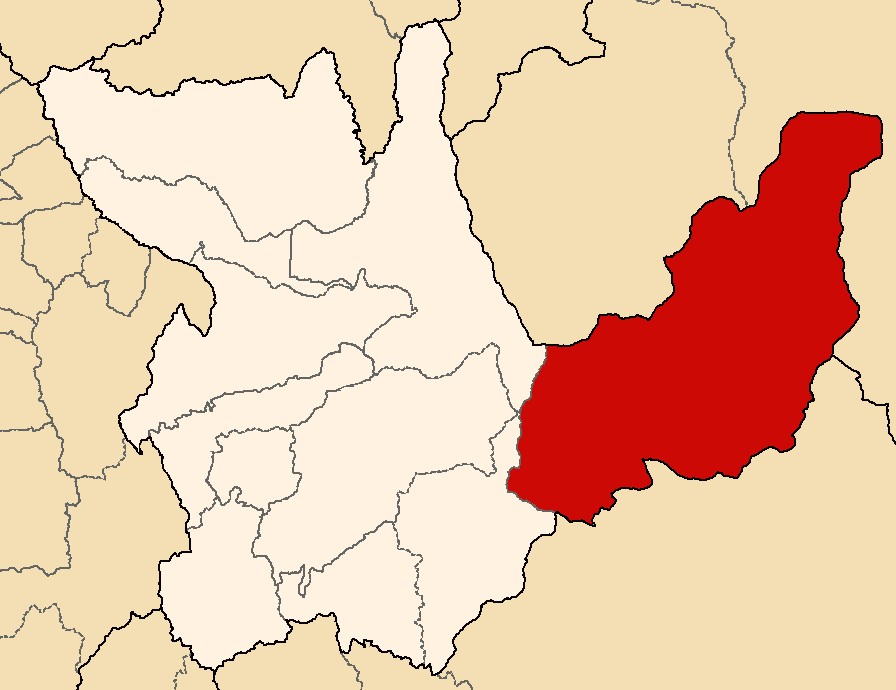
- Location of Puerto Inca in the Huánuco Region
- Country: Peru
- Region: Huánuco
- Capital: Puerto Inca

Government
  - Mayor: Melanio Leonidas Nuñez Vera

Area
  - Total: 9,913.94 km^{2} (3,827.79 sq mi)

Population (2005 census)
  - Total: 31,748
  - Density: 3.2024/km^{2} (8.2941/sq mi)
- UBIGEO: 1009

Puerto Inca is the largest of eleven provinces of the Huánuco Region in Peru. The capital of this province is the city of Puerto Inca.

== Boundaries ==
- North: Ucayali Region
- East: Ucayali Region
- South: Pasco Region
- West: Leoncio Prado Province

== Languages ==
According to the 2007 census, Spanish was spoken by 89.5% of the population as their first language, while 5.5% spoke Quechua, 1.9% spoke Asháninka, 0.3% spoke Aymara, 2.6% spoke other indigenous languages and 0.0% spoke foreign languages.

In the early 20th century, a number of Japanese migrated to the area and established the Kudo and Taba settlements for rice and coffee cultivation.

== Political division ==
The province is divided into five districts:

- Codo del Pozuzo (Codo del Pozuzo)
- Honoria (Honoria)
- Puerto Inca
- Tournavista (Tournavista)
- Yuyapichis (Yuyapichis)

== Places of interest ==
- El Sira Communal Reserve
- Mayantuyacu natural retreat
- Santuario Huishtin – traditional Amazonian Healing Centre and Nature Reserve

== Notes ==
- A species of oribatid mite, Rhynchoppia puertoincaensis was discovered in Puerto Inca province and named after the area in 2017
