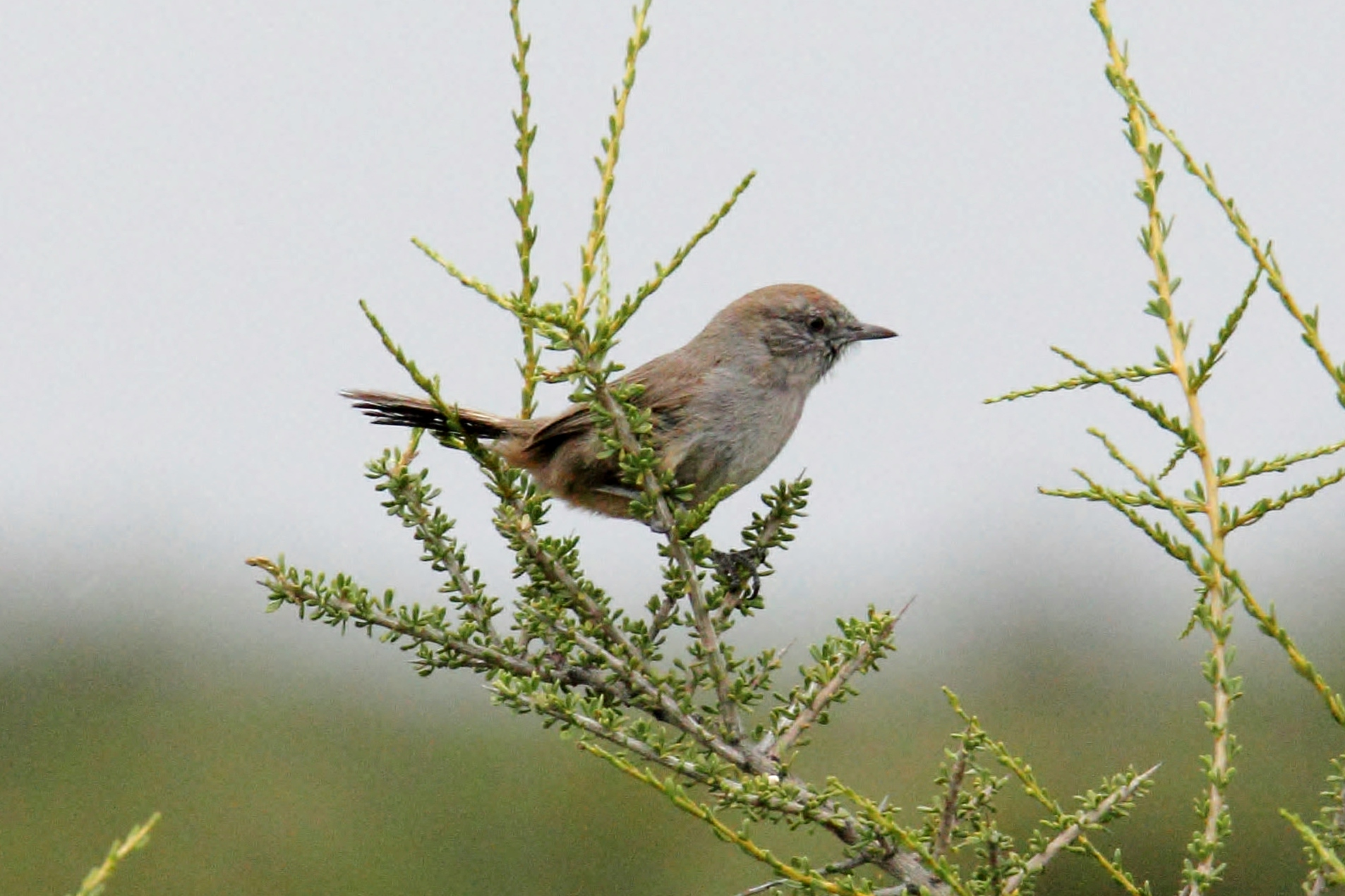

Conservation status
- Least Concern (IUCN 3.1)

Scientific classification
- Kingdom: Animalia
- Phylum: Chordata
- Class: Aves
- Order: Passeriformes
- Family: Furnariidae
- Genus: Pseudasthenes
- Species: P. patagonica

Binomial name
- Pseudasthenes patagonica (D'Orbigny, 1839)

= Patagonian canastero =

Species of bird

The Patagonian canastero (Pseudasthenes patagonica) is a species of bird in the subfamily Furnariinae of the ovenbird family Furnariidae. It is endemic to Argentina.

== Taxonomy and systematics ==
The Patagonian canastero was long placed in genus Asthenes. Beginning in 2010 it and three other members of Asthenes were moved to the newly coined genus Pseudasthenes. The Patagonian canastero is monotypic.

== Description ==
The Patagonian canastero is 14 to 15 cm (5.5 to 5.9 in) long and weighs 14 to 19 g (0.49 to 0.67 oz). The sexes have the same plumage. Adults have a light grayish brown face with hints of a paler supercilium and darker line behind the eye. Their crown and upperparts are light gray-brown. Their wings are somewhat browner and the feathers have somewhat rufescent edges. Their tail is dark gray-brown with chestnut on the outer feathers. Their chin and throat are grayish white with black flecks and streaks on the latter. Their breast is pale grayish, their upper belly pale buff-gray, their lower belly and flanks tawny, and their undertail coverts tawny-rufous.

== Distribution and habitat ==
The Patagonian canastero is found in southern Argentina from the provinces of Mendoza, La Pampa, and Buenos Aires south into northern Santa Cruz Province. It inhabits semi-arid to arid steppe scrublands from near sea level to 700 m (2,300 ft).

== Behavior ==
=== Movement ===
The Patagonian canastero is a year-round resident throughout its range.

=== Feeding ===
The Patagonian canastero feeds mostly on arthropods with some seeds also part of its diet. As best is known, it forages by itself, gleaning prey from the ground and low vegetation.

=== Breeding ===
The Patagonian canastero breeds during the austral spring and summer, roughly from September to November. It is thought to be monogamous. Its nest is a sphere of thorny sticks with a side entrance, typically placed in a bush 1 to 6 m (3 to 20 ft) above the ground. The nest chamber is lined with softer plant material, hair, and feathers. The clutch is usually three eggs and sometimes four. The incubation period is from 15 to 16 days and fledging occurs about 15 days after hatch.

=== Vocalization ===
The Patagonian canastero's song is "a loud, penetrating trill on single pitch, 'tree-ee-ee-ee-ee-ee…' " that is occasionally sung in duet. Its call is " a single loud, sharp note, often repeated".

== Status ==
The IUCN has assessed the Patagonian canastero as being of Least Concern. It has a large range and an unknown population size that is believed to be decreasing. No immediate threats have been identified. It is considered uncommon to fairly common. "Habitat in much of its range subjected to at least moderate grazing."
