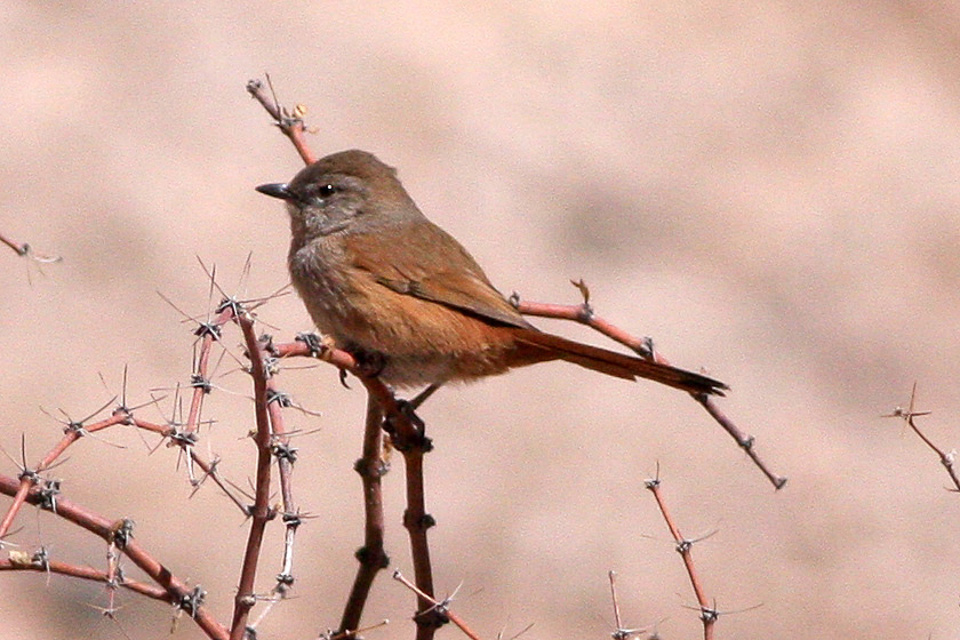

Conservation status
- Least Concern (IUCN 3.1)

Scientific classification
- Kingdom: Animalia
- Phylum: Chordata
- Class: Aves
- Order: Passeriformes
- Family: Furnariidae
- Genus: Pseudasthenes
- Species: P. steinbachi

Binomial name
- Pseudasthenes steinbachi (Hartert, 1909)

= Steinbach's canastero =

Species of bird

Steinbach's canastero (Pseudasthenes steinbachi) or the chestnut canastero, is a species of bird in the Furnariinae subfamily of the ovenbird family Furnariidae. It is endemic to Argentina.

== Taxonomy and systematics ==
Steinbach's canastero was originally described as Siptornis steinbachi and was later long placed in genus Asthenes. Beginning in 2010 it and three other members of Asthenes were moved to the newly coined genus Pseudasthenes. Steinbach's canastero is monotypic. (Subspecies neiffi of the short-billed canastero (Asthenes baeri) was originally described as a subspecies of Steinbach's canastero.)

== Description ==
Steinbach's canastero is 15 to 16 cm (5.9 to 6.3 in) long and weighs 14 to 20 g (0.49 to 0.71 oz). The sexes have the same plumage. Adults have a pale supercilium on an otherwise grayish brown face. Their crown and back are dull gray-brown, their rump chestnut, and their uppertail coverts rufous-chestnut. Their wings are mostly rufous with dark fuscous outer halves to the flight feathers. Their tail's inner feathers are blackish fuscous with rufescent outer webs and the outer two pairs entirely rufous or chestnut. Their chin and throat are whitish with faint dusky specks, their breast and belly grayish, and their flanks and undertail coverts tawny-rufous or pale cinnamon. Their iris is brown to dark brown, their bill black to dark brown, and their legs and feet brown to black.

== Distribution and habitat ==
Steinbach's canastero is found in western Argentina from southern Salta Province south to Neuquén and Río Negro provinces. It inhabits arid montane scrublands, where it favors ravines, and monte woodlands. In elevation it ranges from 500 to 3,000 m (1,600 to 9,800 ft).

== Behavior ==
=== Movement ===
Steinbach's canastero is mostly resident but some in higher elevations move to lower ones after the breeding season.

=== Feeding ===
Little is known about the diet or feeding behavior of Steinbach's canastero. It is usually seen singly or in pairs and is believed to glean arthropods from the ground and low vegetation.

=== Breeding ===
Steinbach's canastero is thought to breed during the austral spring and summer, and is thought to be monogamous. Its nest is a globe of thorny sticks with a side entrance, typically placed in a bush 2 to 5 m (7 to 20 ft) above the ground. The nest chamber is lined with softer plant material, hair, and feathers. The clutch size is two or three eggs. The incubation period, time to fledging, and details of parental care are not known.

=== Vocalization ===
Xeno-canto and the Cornell Lab of Ornithology's Macaulay Library have many recordings of the vocalizations of Steinbach's canastero, but they have not been described in words.

== Status ==
The IUCN originally assessed Steinbach's canastero as Vulnerable but since 2004 has rated it as being of Least Concern. It has a large range and an unknown population size that is believed to be stable. "Settlement and agricultural conversion have altered habitat in small parts of the species range, and grazing by cattle and goats may pose some threat. However, extensive tracts of suitable habitat remain unaffected and the species occurs in several protected areas." It is considered rare to uncommon.
