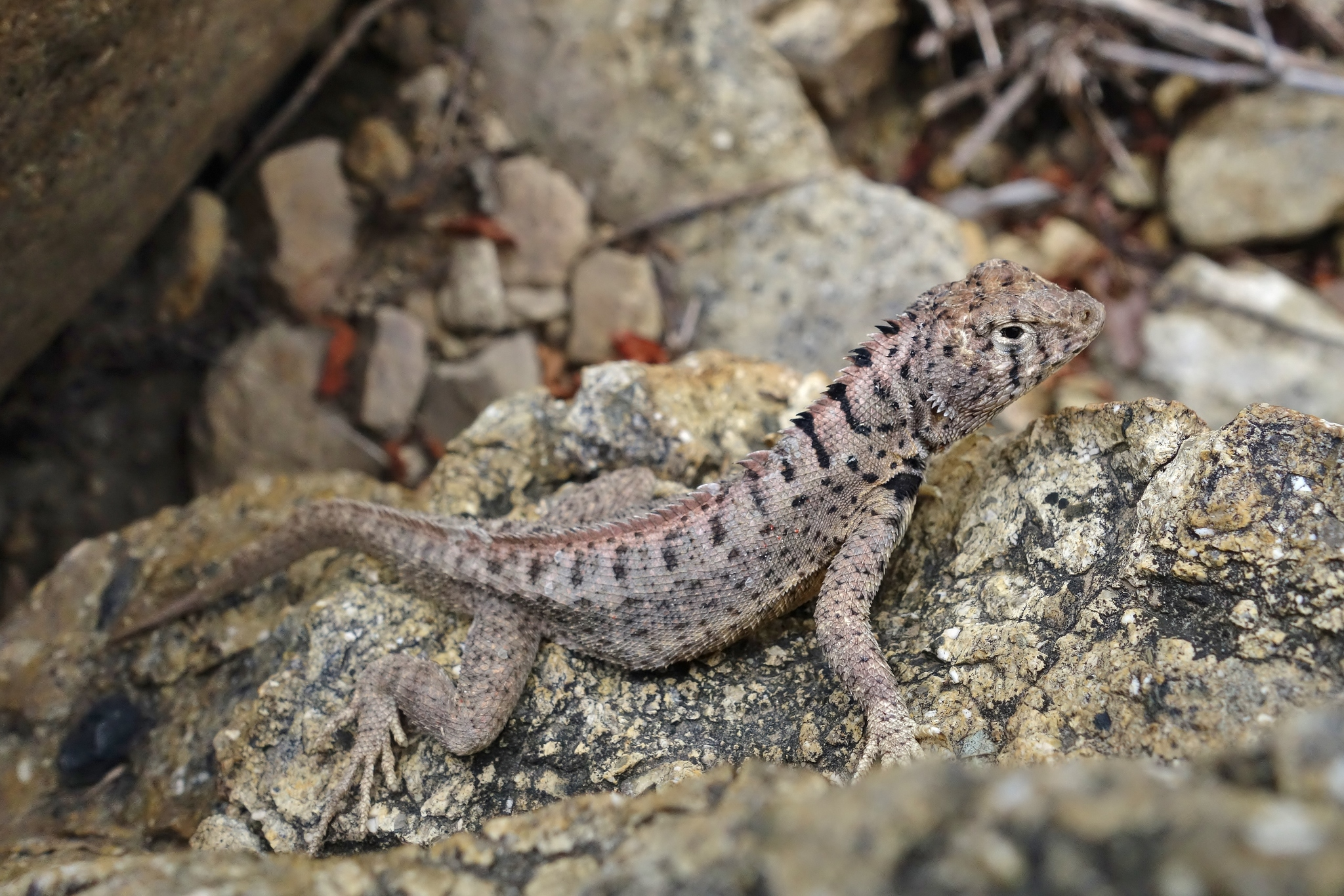

Conservation status
- Least Concern (IUCN 3.1)

Scientific classification
- Kingdom: Animalia
- Phylum: Chordata
- Class: Reptilia
- Order: Squamata
- Suborder: Iguania
- Family: Tropiduridae
- Genus: Microlophus
- Species: M. koepckeorum

Binomial name
- Microlophus koepckeorum (Mertens, 1956)

Synonyms
- Tropidurus occipitalis koepckeorum Mertens, 1956; Tropidurus koepckeorum — Dixon & Wright, 1975; Plesiomicrolophus koepckeorum — Frost, 1992; Microlophus koepckeorum — Frost et al., 2001

= Microlophus koepckeorum =

Species of lizard

Microlophus koepckeorum, commonly known as Frost's iguana, is a species of lava lizard in the family Tropiduridae. The species is endemic to Peru.

== Etymology ==
The specific name, koepckeorum (genitive plural), is in honor of German-born Peruvian ornithologists Hans-Wilhelm Koepcke and Maria Koepcke, husband and wife.

== Habitat ==
The preferred natural habitats of M. koepckeorum are dry forest and dry shrubland, at altitudes of 400–2,330 m (1,310–7,640 ft).

== Reproduction ==
M. koepckeorum is oviparous. An adult female may lay a clutch of 2–6 eggs.
