= Tournavista District =

Coordinates: 8.9321°S 74.7041°W

Tournavista
- District
- Interactive map of Tournavista
- Country: Peru
- Region: Huánuco
- Province: Puerto Inca
- Founded: November 19, 1984
- Capital: Tournavista

Government
  - Mayor: José Aizana Sanchez

Area
  - Total: 2,043.32 km^{2} (788.93 sq mi)
- Elevation: 250 m (820 ft)

Population (2005 census)
  - Total: 6,024
  - Density: 2.948/km^{2} (7.636/sq mi)
- Time zone: UTC-5 (PET)
- UBIGEO: 100904

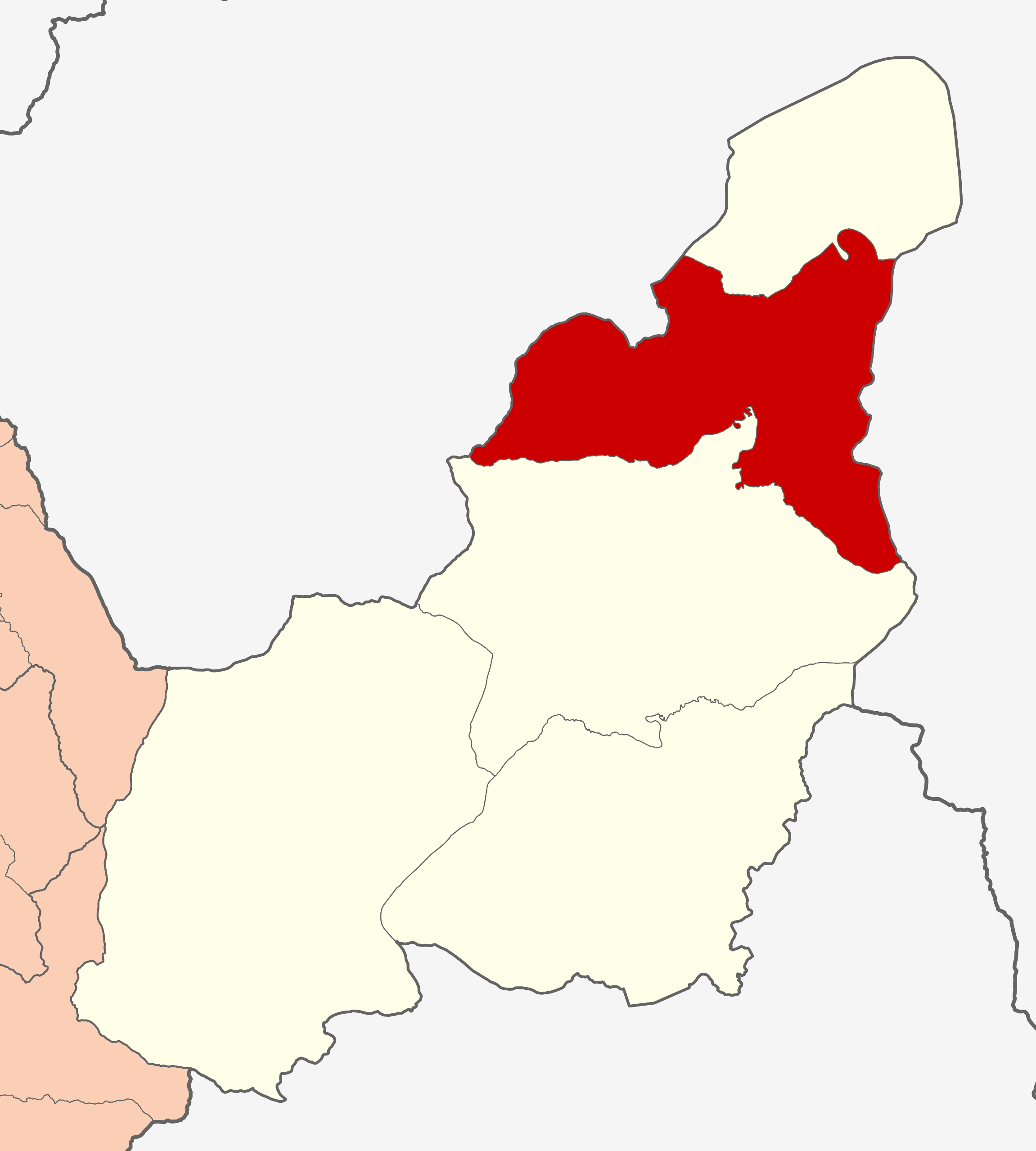
A picture of the District of Tournavista

Tournavista District is one of five districts of the province Puerto Inca in Peru.

== Climate ==
Climate data for Tournavista, elevation 196 m (643 ft), (1991–2020)
Month	Jan	Feb	Mar	Apr	May	Jun	Jul	Aug	Sep	Oct	Nov	Dec	Year
Mean daily maximum °C (°F)	31.1 (88.0)	30.5 (86.9)	30.7 (87.3)	31.0 (87.8)	30.7 (87.3)	30.7 (87.3)	31.2 (88.2)	32.5 (90.5)	32.9 (91.2)	32.3 (90.1)	31.8 (89.2)	31.1 (88.0)	31.4 (88.5)
Mean daily minimum °C (°F)	22.7 (72.9)	22.7 (72.9)	22.7 (72.9)	22.5 (72.5)	21.9 (71.4)	21.3 (70.3)	20.8 (69.4)	21.0 (69.8)	21.7 (71.1)	22.3 (72.1)	22.5 (72.5)	22.7 (72.9)	22.1 (71.7)
Average precipitation mm (inches)	221.9 (8.74)	235.6 (9.28)	196.2 (7.72)	163.7 (6.44)	78.1 (3.07)	61.1 (2.41)	35.1 (1.38)	50.4 (1.98)	73.2 (2.88)	121.7 (4.79)	160.6 (6.32)	230.7 (9.08)	1,628.3 (64.09)
Source: National Meteorology and Hydrology Service of Peru
