= Wings of Hope (film) =

- Juliane Koepcke sitting on a row of seats in the jungle
- Directed by: Werner Herzog
- Starring: Juliane Koepcke; Werner Herzog
- Narrated by: Werner Herzog
- Original languages: German; English (official dub)

Production
- Producer: Lucki Stipetic
- Cinematography: Peter Zeitlinger
- Editor: Joe Bini
- Running time: 68 minutes

Original release
- Release: 1998

Wings of Hope (German: Julianes Sturz in den Dschungel, literally "Juliane's Fall into the Jungle") is a 1998 made-for-TV documentary directed by Werner Herzog. The film explores the story of Juliane Koepcke, a German Peruvian woman who was the sole survivor of Peruvian flight LANSA Flight 508 following its mid-air disintegration after a lightning strike in 1971. Herzog was inspired to make this film since he had narrowly avoided taking the same flight while he was location scouting for Aguirre, the Wrath of God; his reservation had been canceled due to a last minute change in itinerary.

In the film, Herzog and Koepcke visit the scenes of her flight, crash, and escape from the jungle. They take a flight from Lima to Pucallpa (though with a different airline), and sit in the same row of seats where Koepcke sat during the crash. They unearth many large fragments of the plane in the jungle, and then visit the river routes where she traveled for 10 days on foot, and the small village where she was eventually found by three men, one of whom appears in the film.

Wings of Hope is often seen as a companion piece or sequel to Herzog's 1997 film Little Dieter Needs to Fly, in which he retraces the steps of a U.S. Navy pilot's successful escape from a POW camp during the Vietnam War.

== Production ==
Herzog had planned to make the film ever since narrowly missing the flight, but was unable to contact Koepcke for many years since she shied away from any media coverage. Herzog finally located her in Munich after contacting the priest who performed the funeral for Koepcke's mother. Koepcke's dreams, as described in the film and shot in documentary style, were invented and scripted by Herzog.

== See also ==
- 1998 in film
- Miracles Still Happen (1974), a biopic about Juliane Koepcke's ordeal
