= Codo del Pozuzo District =

Coordinates: 9.6739°S 75.4623°W

Codo de Pozuzo
- District
- Coat of arms
- Interactive map of Codo de Pozuzo
- Country: Peru
- Region: Huánuco
- Province: Puerto Inca
- Founded: November 19, 1984
- Capital: Codo del Pozuzo

Government
  - Mayor: Carlos José Macalupu Caballero

Area
  - Total: 3,328.39 km^{2} (1,285.10 sq mi)
- Elevation: 450 m (1,480 ft)

Population (2005 census)
  - Total: 6,238
  - Density: 1.874/km^{2} (4.854/sq mi)
- Time zone: UTC-5 (PET)
- UBIGEO: 100902
- Website: municododelpozuzo.gob.pe

Codo de Pozuzo District is one of five districts of the province Puerto Inca in Peru.

== History ==
Codo del Pozuzo is a racial integration of Europeans (Austrians and Germanise), Peruvian ethnic group and different provinces of the country. This district is situated in the central jungle, and has progressed very fast by its own people, for their authorities and for their wide and flat country.
