= Shanay-timpishka =

River in Peru

Location
- Countries: Peru

Physical characteristics
- Source: Mayantuyacu
  - location: Agua Caliente, Peru
  - coordinates: 8°48′50″S 74°44′24″W
  - elevation: 265 m (869 ft)
- Mouth: Pachitea River
  - location: Honoria, Peru
  - coordinates: 8°48′04″S 74°42′32″W
  - elevation: 160 m (520 ft)
- Length: 9 km (5.6 mi)
- Width
  - maximum: 25 m (82 ft)
- Depth
  - maximum: 6.1 m (20 ft)

Basin features
- Progression: Pachitea River → Ucayali River → Amazon → Atlantic Ocean
- River system: Amazon River

The Shanay-timpishka, more popularly known as the "Boiling River of the Amazon", is a tributary of the Pachitea River, which subsequently flows into the Ucayali River, the main headstream of the Amazon River. It is one of the largest documented thermal rivers in the world; the entire river system is around 9 km (5.6 mi), but only the lower 6.3 km (3.9 mi) is thermal. Its deepest point is around 4.5 m (15 ft), and its widest is around 30 m (98 ft).

At its headwaters, its temperatures are that of a typical jungle stream at around 27 °C (81 °F). As the stream flows over geologic fault-zones, hot geothermal waters rise from deep in the earth and increase the temperature greatly: the hottest temperature ever measured in the river was 99.1 °C (210.4 °F) in a hot spring, while the hottest average river temperature ever recorded was nearly 95 °C (203 °F).

== Name ==
The Quechua name "Shanay-timpishka" means 'boiled by the heat of the sun'—from shanay (heat of the sun) and t'impuy ("to boil"), though the source of the heat is actually geothermal.

The most popular name for this site is "Boiling River" or "Río Hirviente" (Spanish). An individual hot spring in the river is commonly known as “La Bomba" (The Pump).

== Location and mythology ==
The river is located in Peru, in the State of Huánuco, the Province of Puerto Inca, and the District of Honoria. As part of the Pachitea River's watershed, it is located in Amazon "omagua" (low) jungle. Three communities are located along the Boiling River: Mayantuyacu, Santuario Huishtín, and Shanay-timpishka Center.

Local shamans believe that the boiling water is birthed by Yacumama, a giant serpent spirit known as the "Mother of the Waters."

== Scientific explanation ==
Andrés Ruzo, a geothermal scientist, has investigated the source of the heat. He initially learned of it as a child from his grandfather. The river maintains its high temperature despite not being near any known active volcanoes or geothermal vents, which normally provide geothermal heating for groundwater. Despite its unique nature, National Geographic has described it as an entirely natural feature: a non-volcanic, geothermal feature flowing at anomalously high rates. The predominant theory for the source of this heat is from the geothermal gradient of the Earth. Being closer to the Earth's mantle, underground water tends to be of a higher temperature than surface water. The theory is that rainwater falls onto the surface of the Amazon Rainforest and finds deep-rooted faults where it travels down into the crust. The water is thus heated in accordance with the geothermal gradient. It is then likely fed to the surface of the Earth through fault-fed hot springs that act to heat up the river along its stretch.

== Threats ==
The area faces threats from deforestation. According to National Geographic, up to ninety-nine percent of this is the result of local indigenous populations selling the higher-value lumber from larger trees, then clear-burning the rest. The only section of pristine jungle remaining is the concession granted to Maple Energy, a local oil and gas company, which complies with environmental regulations under penalty of fines.
