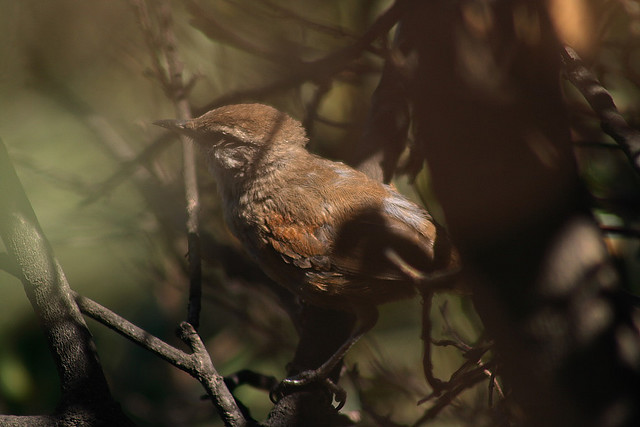
- Dusky-tailed canastero (Pseudasthenes humicola)

Scientific classification
- Kingdom: Animalia
- Phylum: Chordata
- Class: Aves
- Order: Passeriformes
- Family: Furnariidae
- Genus: Pseudasthenes; Derryberry et al., 2010

Type species
- Synallaxis patagonica Patagonian canastero D'Orbigny, 1839

Species
- See text

= Pseudasthenes =

Genus of birds

Pseudasthenes is a genus of small suboscine passerine birds, commonly known as canasteros or false canasteros, in the ovenbird family. It was described in 2010 to accommodate four species split from the related genus Asthenes. The genus is endemic to South America

== Species ==
The four species in the genus are:

Genus Pseudasthenes – D'Orbigny, 1839 – Four species
Common name	Scientific name and subspecies	Range	Size and ecology	IUCN status and estimated population
Dusky-tailed canastero	Pseudasthenes humicola (Kittlitz, 1830) Three subspecies: P. h. humicola (Kittlitz, 1830); P. h. goodalli (Marin, Kiff & Peña, 1989); P. h. polysticta (Hellmayr, 1925)	Chile.	Size: Habitat: Diet:	LC
Patagonian canastero	Pseudasthenes patagonica (D'Orbigny, 1839)	Argentina	Size: Habitat: Diet:	LC
Steinbach's canastero	Pseudasthenes steinbachi (Hartert, 1909)	Argentina	Size: Habitat: Diet:	LC
Cactus canastero	Pseudasthenes cactorum (Koepcke, 1959)	Peru	Size: Habitat: Diet:	LC
