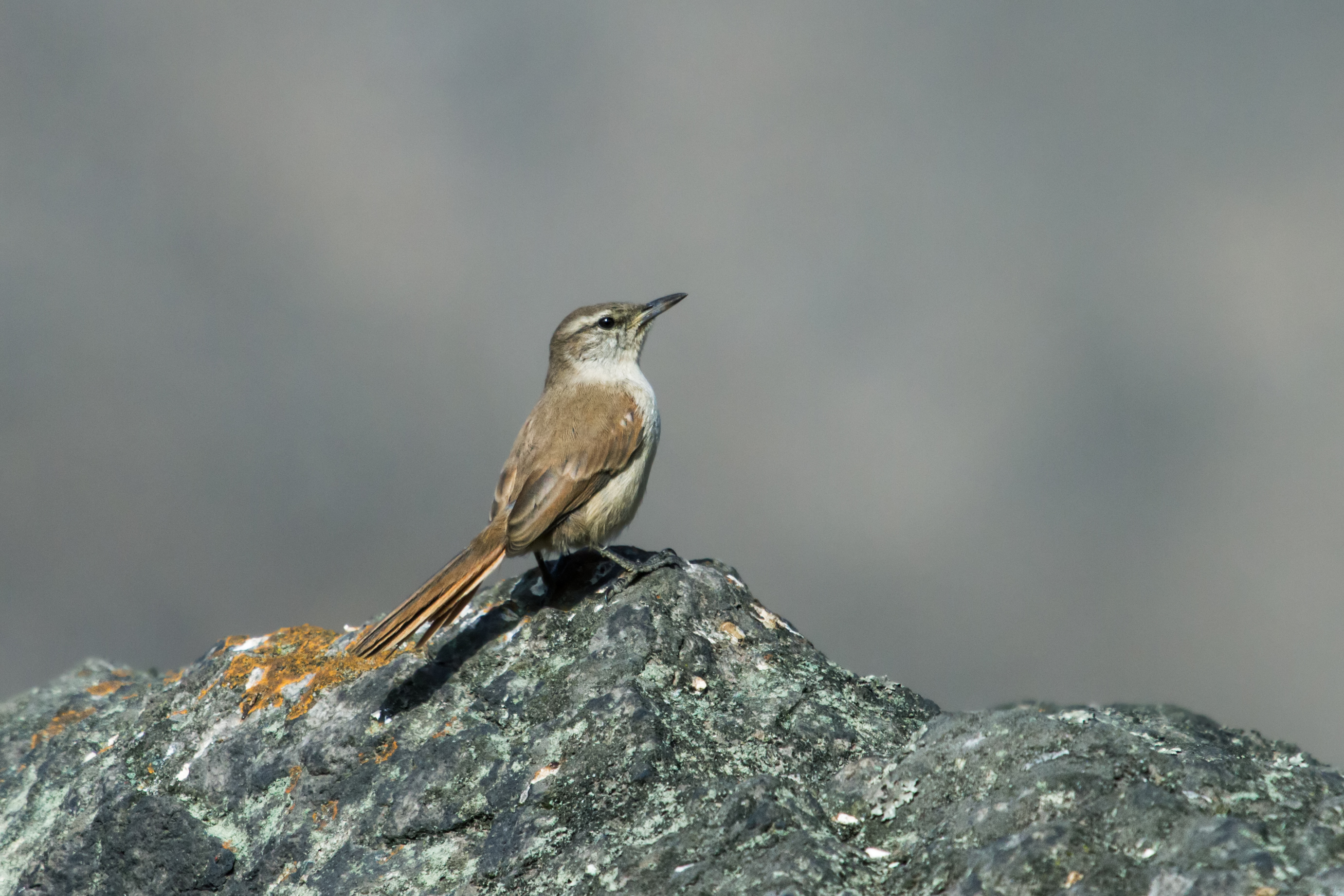

Conservation status
- Least Concern (IUCN 3.1)

Scientific classification
- Kingdom: Animalia
- Phylum: Chordata
- Class: Aves
- Order: Passeriformes
- Family: Furnariidae
- Genus: Pseudasthenes
- Species: P. cactorum

Binomial name
- Pseudasthenes cactorum (Koepcke, 1959)

= Cactus canastero =

Species of bird

The cactus canastero (Pseudasthenes cactorum) is a species of bird in the Furnariinae subfamily of the ovenbird family Furnariidae. It is endemic to Peru.

== Taxonomy and systematics ==
The cactus canastero was long placed in genus Asthenes. Beginning in 2010 it and three other members of Asthenes were moved to the newly coined genus Pseudasthenes. Beyond that move, its taxonomy is unsettled. The International Ornithological Committee and BirdLife International's Handbook of the Birds of the World treat it as monotypic. The Clements taxonomy assigns it two subspecies, the nominate P. c. cactorum (Koepcke, 1959) and P. c. lachayensis (Keopcke, 1965). However, the two putative taxa "appear to be products of clinal variation combined with differences in degree of plumage wear, and described characters do not permit diagnosis of individual specimens".

This article follows the monotypic species model.

== Description ==
The cactus canastero is 13 to 14 cm (5.1 to 5.5 in) long and weighs 16 to 19 g (0.56 to 0.67 oz). The sexes have the same plumage. Adults have a pale buff supercilium, fuscous lores and stripe behind the eye, and dull buff ear coverts. Their crown and upperparts are uniform plain dull brown. Their wing coverts are mostly dull rufous and their flight feathers dull fuscous with a rufous patch that shows as a band on the closed wing. Their tail's central pair of feathers are brown, the next two pairs dull dark fuscous with tawny edges on the outer webs, the next pair rufous with dark fuscous edges near their base, and the outer two pairs almost entirely rufous. Their chin and center of their throat are pale orange-tawny; their breast and the rest of their underparts are pale buff. Their iris is brown, their maxilla black to gray, their mandible blue-gray with a blackish tip, and their legs and feet gray-brown to black.

== Distribution and habitat ==
The cactus canastero is found on the west slope of the Andes in Peru, in the Department of La Libertad and then from the Department of Lima south to the Department of Arequipa. It inhabits arid montane scrublands with scattered bushes and columnar cacti. In elevation it ranges between 50 and 2,500 m (160 and 8,200 ft).

== Behavior ==
=== Movement ===
The cactus canastero is a year-round resident throughout its range.

=== Feeding ===
Little is known about the diet or feeding behavior of the cactus canastero. It is usually seen singly or in pairs and is believed to glean arthropods from the ground, rocks, cacti, and maybe low vegetation.

=== Breeding ===
The cactus canastero breeds in the austral spring and summer. It is thought to be monogamous and nests in columnar cacti. Nothing else is known about its breeding biology.

=== Vocalization ===
The cactus canastero's song is "a weak, dry trill lasting up to 6 seconds" and its call a "low-pitched, fast, dry trill" that is often repeated.

== Status ==
The IUCN has assessed the cactus canastero as being of Least Concern. It has a large range and an unknown population size that is believed to be decreasing. No immediate threats have been identified. It is poorly known and considered uncommon. Its "[h]abitat is subjected to at least moderate overgrazing".
