= Honoria District =

Coordinates: 8.7680°S 74.7097°W

Honoria
- District
- Interactive map of Honoria
- Country: Peru
- Region: Huánuco
- Province: Puerto Inca
- Founded: February 2, 1956
- Capital: Honoria

Government
  - Mayor: Boris Pinedo Alonso

Area
  - Total: 798.05 km^{2} (308.13 sq mi)
- Elevation: 265 m (869 ft)

Population (2005 census)
  - Total: 5,054
  - Density: 6.333/km^{2} (16.40/sq mi)
- Time zone: UTC-5 (PET)
- UBIGEO: 100903

Honoria District is one of five districts of the province Puerto Inca in Peru.
