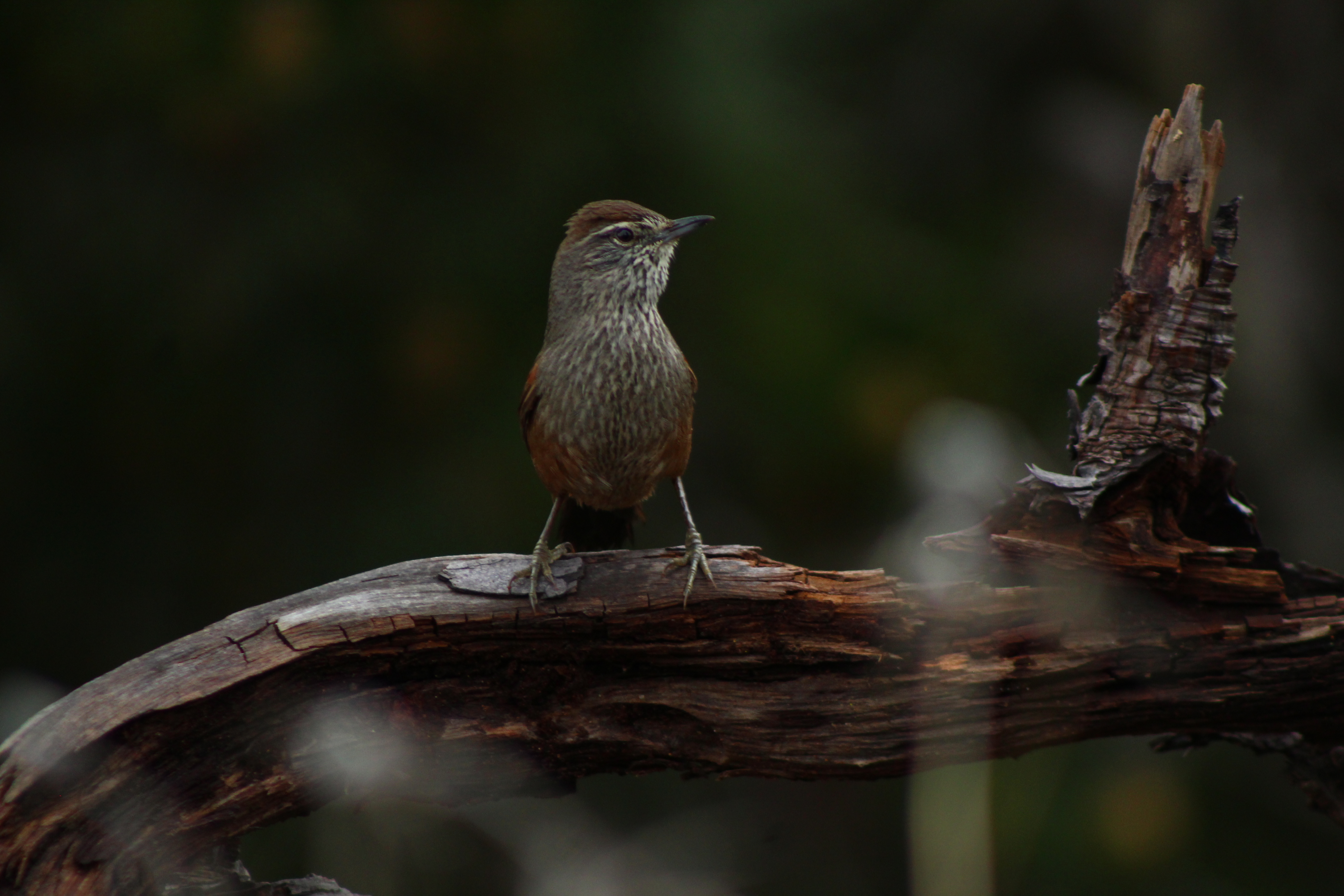

Conservation status
- Least Concern (IUCN 3.1)

Scientific classification
- Kingdom: Animalia
- Phylum: Chordata
- Class: Aves
- Order: Passeriformes
- Family: Furnariidae
- Genus: Pseudasthenes
- Species: P. humicola

Binomial name
- Pseudasthenes humicola (Kittlitz, 1830)

Synonyms
- see text

= Dusky-tailed canastero =

Species of bird

The dusky-tailed canastero (Pseudasthenes humicola) is a species of bird in the Furnariinae subfamily of the ovenbird family Furnariidae. It is endemic to Chile.

== Taxonomy and systematics ==
The dusky-tailed canastero was originally described as Synallaxis humicola and subsequently placed in genera Siptornis, Thripophaga, and Asthenes by various authors and taxonomic systems. Beginning in about 2010 it and three other members of Asthenes were moved to the newly coined genus Pseudasthenes.

The dusky-tailed canastero has three subspecies, the nominate P. h. humicola (Kittlitz, 1830), P. h. goodalli (Marin, Kiff & Peña, 1989), and P. h. polysticta (Hellmayr, 1925).

== Description ==
The dusky-tailed canastero is 14 to 16 cm (5.5 to 6.3 in) long and weighs 18 to 24 g (0.63 to 0.85 oz). The sexes have the same plumage. Adults of the nominate subspecies have a narrow whitish supercilium on an otherwise dark gray-brown face with faint paler streaks. Their crown is dark brown, their back a slightly paler brown, and paler brown rump and uppertail coverts that have a rufescent tinge. Their wings are mostly the same brown as the back with dull rufous on the shoulder. Their tail's central feathers are also mostly the same brown as the back with dark fuscous tips; the rest of the feathers are fuscous blackish. Their throat is whitish with black flecks, their upper breast whitish with black streaks, their lower breast brownish gray with faint pale streaks, their belly paler unstreaked brownish gray, their flanks rufescent brown, and their undertail coverts darker rufous-brown. Their iris is dark brown, their maxilla dull black, their mandible bluish gray with a black tip, and their legs and feet greenish to gray. Juveniles have a more rufous rump than adults, with less streaking on the underparts more rufescent on the tail. Compared to the nominate, subspecies P. h. goodalli has more streaks on its face, a darker crown, less visible streaks on its breast, and brighter cinnamon on its shoulder, flanks, and undertail coverts. P. h. polysticta is very like the nominate but with duller brown flanks and undertail coverts and more spotting on the underparts.

== Distribution and habitat ==
The dusky-tailed canastero is endemic to Chile. Subspecies P. h. goodalli is the northernmost. It is found in the southwestern part of the Antofagasta Region in the north of the country. The nominate subspecies is found from the Atacama Region south into the northern part of the Maule Region. At least one historical record in western Argentina leads The International Ornithological Committee to include "Argentina (?)" as part of its range, but that record has not been accepted by the South American Classification Committee of the American Ornithological Society or the Clements taxonomy. Subspecies P. h. polysticta is found from southern Maule south to the Araucanía Region.

The dusky-tailed canastero's habitat varies geographically. In the northern part of its range it is found in desert with some shrubs and the edges of dry forest near the coast, and very locally inland in valleys with some vegetation. In the central and southern parts of its range it extends from near the coast up to about 1,800 m (5,900 ft) in the piedmont foothills. There it inhabits semi-arid steppe landscapes with many bushes and the edges of forests as well. In all parts of its range it shuns populated areas.

== Behavior ==
=== Movement ===
The dusky-tailed canastero is a year-round resident throughout its range.

=== Feeding ===
The dusky-tailed canastero feeds mostly on arthropods but includes smaller amounts of berries and seeds in its diet. It forages mostly by itself or in pairs, taking its prey while moving among the branches of shrubs and trees.

=== Breeding ===
The dusky-tailed canastero breeds between August and December with the peak of activity in mid-September. Both members of a pair build the nest, a covered basket of thorny twigs suspended from a forked branch or cactus. Its egg chamber is lined with softer plant material, horsehair, and feathers. The clutch size is two to four eggs. The incubation period is 20 to 22 days and fledging occurs 15 to 16 days after hatch. Both parents incubate the clutch and provision nestlings.

=== Vocalization ===
The dusky-tailed canastero has two songs which are mostly sung during the breeding season. One is squeaky disyllabic notes "gradually becoming louder, higher-pitched, and longer in duration after which notes again get fainter, shorter, and lower-pitched...chi-wee.. chi-wee". The other is a "long, somewhat variable dry rattling trill which descends in pitch". Its call, heard year-round, is a "short and sharp tsik".

== Status ==
The IUCN has assessed the dusky-tailed canastero as being of Least Concern. It has a large range and an unknown population size that is believed to be decreasing. No immediate threats have been identified. It occurs in several protected areas. However, it "does not tolerate human disturbance, so changes in habitat may negatively impact the population."
