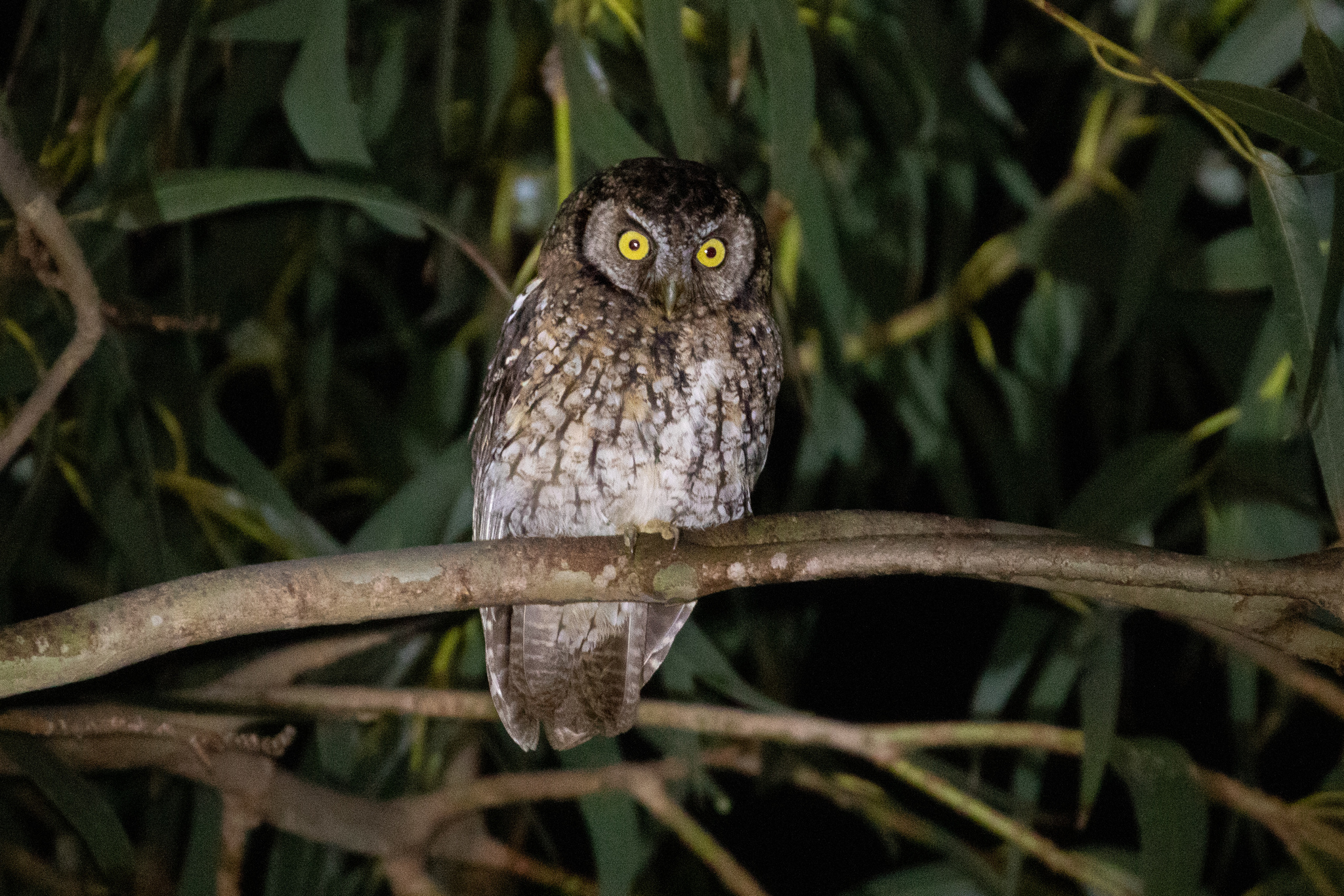

Conservation status
- Least Concern (IUCN 3.1)
- CITES Appendix II (CITES)

Scientific classification
- Domain: Eukaryota
- Kingdom: Animalia
- Phylum: Chordata
- Class: Aves
- Order: Strigiformes
- Family: Strigidae
- Genus: Megascops
- Species: M. koepckeae

Binomial name
- Megascops koepckeae (Hekstra, 1982)

Synonyms
- Otus choliba koepckeae Hekstra, 1982

= Koepcke's screech owl =

Species of owl

Koepcke's screech owl (Megascops koepckeae) is a species of owl in the family Strigidae. It is endemic to Peru.

== Taxonomy and systematics ==
Koepcke's screech owl was originally described as a subspecies of tropical screech owl (then Otus choliba, now Megascops choliba), and they are now considered sister species. It was named in honor of Maria Koepcke, a German ornithologist who worked extensively in Peru. It has two subspecies, the nominate M. k. koepckeae and M. k. hockingi.

== Description ==
Koepcke's screech owl is about 24 cm (9.4 in) long. Six individuals of M. k. koepckeae weighed 112 to 127 g (4.0 to 4.5 oz) and three of M. k. hockingi 121 to 130 g (4.3 to 4.6 oz). The nominate subspecies has a whitish gray facial disc with darker speckles and a blackish rim. It has short whitish brows above yellow eyes. The crown is very dark brown with pale brown speckles. The upperparts are grayish brown to dark brown with blackish or dusky streaks and dark barring. The folded wing shows a line of whitish spots. The tail is dark brown with narrow ochre bars and small speckles. The underparts are grayish white and have wide dark brown streaks and irregular bars. The upper breast has a pale brownish ochre wash. M. k. hockingi is similar to the nominate but grayer, and the markings on its underparts are less apparent.

== Distribution and habitat ==
Koepcke's screech owl is found only in Peru. The nominate subspecies has a disjunct range including the northerly Departments of Lambayeque, Cajamarca, and La Libertad; the valley of the Utcubamba River; and small areas of the Departments of Ancash and Lima. M. k. hockingi is found further south, irregularly from southern Junín Department to the Departments of Huancavelica, Ayacucho, and Apurímac.

The two subspecies of Koepcke's screech owl inhabit different landscapes. The nominate uses evergreen forests between 1,840 and 4,500 m (6,040 and 14,760 ft) while M. k. hockingi inhabits dry forest and scrubby areas in intermontane valleys. In elevation it ranges between 1,400 and 3,400 m (4,600 and 11,200 ft) but is usually found below 2,000 m (6,600 ft).

== Behavior ==
=== Feeding ===
Like most other screech owls, Koepcke's screech owl is nocturnal. Its diet has not been well studied but appears to be mostly insects and might include small vertebrates.

=== Breeding ===
The breeding phenology of Koepcke's screech owl is also essentially undocumented. In south central Peru it breeds in February and March. It is assumed to usually nest in tree cavities like others of its genus but the only reported nest was in a cavity in an earthen bank.

=== Vocalization ===
The territorial song of Koepcke's screech owl has been described as "a loud, staccato series of notes with slowing pace and rising volume: ko-ko-ko-ko ka ka KA KAH!". M. k. hockingi's song is similar but is longer and higher pitched. An aggressive song is "a series of quieter short hoots rising and falling in pitch". Pairs sometimes sing in duet.

== Status ==
The IUCN has assessed Koepcke's screech owl as being of Least Concern. Though its population size has not been determined, it is believed to be stable. The species appears to adapt well to highly degraded habitat as long as some trees remain for nesting and roosting.
