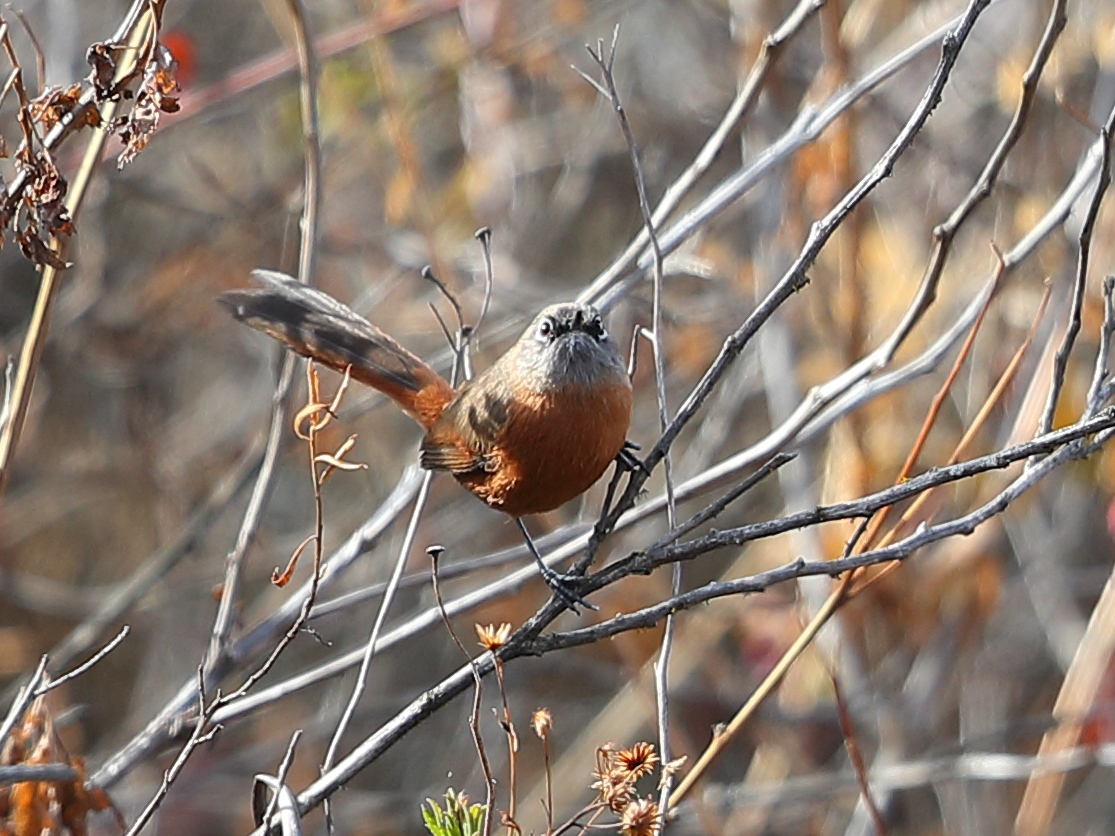

Conservation status
- Vulnerable (IUCN 3.1)

Scientific classification
- Kingdom: Animalia
- Phylum: Chordata
- Class: Aves
- Order: Passeriformes
- Family: Furnariidae
- Genus: Synallaxis
- Species: S. zimmeri

Binomial name
- Synallaxis zimmeri Koepcke, 1957

= Russet-bellied spinetail =

Species of bird

The russet-bellied spinetail (Synallaxis zimmeri) is a Vulnerable species of bird in the Furnariinae subfamily of the ovenbird family Furnariidae. It is endemic to Peru.

== Taxonomy and systematics ==
The russet-bellied spinetail appears to have no close relatives within genus Synallaxis and some authors have suggested that it deserves its own genus.

The russet-bellied spinetail is monotypic.

== Description ==
The russet-bellied spinetail is 16.5 to 17 cm (6.5 to 6.7 in) long and weighs 12 to 14 g (0.42 to 0.49 oz). The sexes have the same plumage. Adults have a faint gray-white supercilium, a distinct but broken white eyering, and blackish lores on an otherwise gray face. Their crown is gray, their back and rump olivaceous gray, and their uppertail coverts bright rufous. Their wing coverts are almost chestnut and the flight feathers brownish. Their tail's central pair of feathers are dark fuscous; the feathers become progressively more rufous to the outermost. Their chin is ashy-gray to white, throat grayish brown, and their upper breast grayish brown with faint paler streaks. The rest of their underparts are rufous; that color is darkest on the undertail coverts. Their iris is black or dark gray, their bill dark gray to black, and their legs and feet dark gray.

== Distribution and habitat ==
The russet-bellied spinetail is found on the west slope of the Andes in west-central Peru. The known locations are scattered from western Department of La Libertad south into Department of Ancash; it is suspected to also occur outside this corridor. It is the southernmost representative of genus Synallaxis on the west side of the Andes. It inhabits arid woody scrublands characterized by dense stands of short, thorny, trees and shrubs. In elevation it ranges between 2,100 and 2,900 m (6,900 and 9,500 ft) and is most common above 2,500 m (8,200 ft).

== Behavior ==
=== Movement ===
The russet-bellied spinetail is a year-round resident throughout its range.

=== Feeding ===
The russet-bellied spinetail feeds on arthropods, seeds, and other plant material. It typically forages singly, in pairs, or in small family groups. It mostly gleans its prey from foliage, moss, and branches up to about 2 m (7 ft) above the ground. It also forages on the ground, scratching on soil and leaf litter while hopping about.

=== Breeding ===
The russet-bellied spinetail's breeding season has not been defined, but nestlings have been observed in May. Its nest is a globe woven of sticks and twigs with a side extension through which a tunnel leads to the inner chamber; the chamber is lined with softer plant material. Nothing else is known about the species' breeding biology.

=== Vocalization ===
The russet-bellied spinetail's song is "a mewing or nasal-like prr'kuit kuit", typically sung from deep in vegetation. Its calls include "a nasal tu-vit" and "a squeakier djewit".

== Status ==
The IUCN originally assessed the russet-bellied spinetail as Threatened, then in 1994 as Endangered, and since late 2020 as Vulnerable. It has a small range and its estimated population of 600 to 1700 mature individuals is believed to be decreasing due to habitat destruction. "Dense undergrowth habitat within its range is severely degraded by grazing of cattle and goats, and is cleared for agricultural expansion and plantations." It is thought to be "fairly common locally" but its habitat is patchy and fragmented so its sub-populations are not contiguous.
