= Yuyapichis District =

Coordinates: 9.6285°S 74.9740°W

Yuyapichis
- District
- Interactive map of Yuyapichis
- Country: Peru
- Region: Huánuco
- Province: Puerto Inca
- Founded: November 19, 1984
- Capital: Yuyapichis

Government
  - Mayor: Esteban Gibson Bedon Almendrades

Area
  - Total: 1,673 km^{2} (646 sq mi)
- Elevation: 250 m (820 ft)

Population (2005 census)
  - Total: 5,587
  - Density: 3.340/km^{2} (8.649/sq mi)
- Time zone: UTC-5 (PET)
- UBIGEO: 100905

Yuyapichis District is one of five districts of the province Puerto Inca in Peru.

== Languages ==
According to the 2007 census, Spanish was spoken by 90.3% of the population as their first language, while 4.5% spoke Asháninka, 4.3% spoke Quechua, 0.5% spoke Aymara. 0.1% spoke other indigenous languages and 0.0% spoke foreign languages.
