= Puerto Inca =

- Town
- Location within Peru
- Country: Peru
- Region: Huánuco
- Province: Puerto Inca
- District: Puerto Inca
- Time zone: UTC-5 (PET)

Puerto Inca is a town in Central Peru, capital of the province Puerto Inca in the region Huánuco.

== Climate ==
Climate data for Puerto Inca, elevation 212 m (696 ft), (1991–2020)
Month	Jan	Feb	Mar	Apr	May	Jun	Jul	Aug	Sep	Oct	Nov	Dec	Year
Mean daily maximum °C (°F)	31.0 (87.8)	30.6 (87.1)	30.8 (87.4)	30.9 (87.6)	30.7 (87.3)	30.6 (87.1)	30.9 (87.6)	32.3 (90.1)	32.7 (90.9)	32.2 (90.0)	31.5 (88.7)	31.2 (88.2)	31.3 (88.3)
Mean daily minimum °C (°F)	22.2 (72.0)	22.2 (72.0)	22.0 (71.6)	21.8 (71.2)	21.3 (70.3)	20.5 (68.9)	20.0 (68.0)	20.3 (68.5)	21.1 (70.0)	22.0 (71.6)	22.3 (72.1)	22.3 (72.1)	21.5 (70.7)
Average precipitation mm (inches)	302.4 (11.91)	294.3 (11.59)	256.3 (10.09)	158.8 (6.25)	124.0 (4.88)	79.0 (3.11)	77.1 (3.04)	60.4 (2.38)	108.0 (4.25)	176.7 (6.96)	246.1 (9.69)	283.4 (11.16)	2,166.5 (85.31)
Source: National Meteorology and Hydrology Service of Peru
