= Maria Koepcke =

German ornithologist (1924–1971)

- Born: Maria Emilie Anna von Mikulicz-Radecki; 15 May 1924; Leipzig, Weimar Republic
- Died: c. 24 December 1971 (aged 47); Amazon rainforest, Peru
- Education: University of Kiel
- Spouse: Hans-Wilhelm Koepcke
- Children: Juliane Koepcke

Maria Koepcke (born Maria Emilie Anna von Mikulicz-Radecki, 15 May 1924 – c. 24 December 1971) was a German ornithologist known for her work with Neotropical bird species. Koepcke was a well-respected authority in South American ornithology and her work is still referenced today. For her efforts, she is commemorated in the scientific names of four Peruvian bird species and, along with her husband, a Peruvian lizard species.

== Biography ==
Maria Emilie Anna von Mikulicz-Radecki was born in Leipzig, Saxony, Germany on 15 May 1924, the daughter of Felix von Mikulicz-Radecki, a university professor of gynaecology, and Käthe Finzenhangen. Her father's family descended from Polish nobility and the Polish surgeon Jan Mikulicz-Radecki was a relative of hers.

As a young woman, Koepcke set out to study animals. It was in 1949 that Koepcke obtained her doctorate in zoology from the University of Kiel. During her time in Kiel, she met her future husband, Hans-Wilhelm Koepcke, also a student of zoology. After receiving their degrees, the two traveled to Peru in order to study birds and other wildlife native to the area and they were married there in 1950. They lived in Miraflores, a suburb of Lima, and managed Casa Humboldt, a visitor's centre, until it closed in 1967. The Koepckes' only child, a daughter named Juliane Margaret Beate Koepcke, was born in Lima in 1954.

Koepcke died at the age of 47 following the crash of LANSA Flight 508 in the Peruvian jungle. On 24 December 1971, she and Juliane boarded the flight to travel to Pucallpa, where Hans-Wilhelm was working at the time, to spend Christmas there with him. The plane crashed due to a lightning strike during a heavy storm. Separated during the crash, it later was determined that Koepcke had been mortally wounded and died several days afterwards from her injuries. Her daughter, Juliane, was the only survivor of the crash, having fallen from 3,000 m (10,000 ft), still strapped into her seat that, apparently, cushioned her landing. Although injured, without food, and unable to find her mother, the teenager then hiked for eleven days through the rainforest until she found help.

At the time of her death, Koepcke was a department head for a natural history museum affiliated with the National University of San Marcos in Lima and a member of the German Ornithologists' Society.

After Koepcke's death, Hans-Wilhelm and Juliane both left Peru for West Germany, Juliane in 1972, and Hans-Wilhelm in 1974. Hans-Wilhelm lived in Hamburg, teaching zoology at the University of Hamburg until his death in 2000. Like her parents, Juliane studied zoology at the University of Kiel. She became a mammalogist, specializing in the study of bats.

== Ornithology ==
Koepcke moved to Lima in 1950 at the age of 26 to work at the Javier Prado museum. Along with her husband, she made expeditions across the region. The couple named their home in Lima as "Casa Humboldt." She collected more than 1500 specimens in the region, describing 14 taxa between 1954 and 1971. The new species she described included Zaratornis stresemanni, Synallaxis zimmeri and Asthenes cactorum. She illustrated many of her papers herself. Several species were also named after her.

- Koepcke's screech owl, Megascops koepckeae
- Koepcke's hermit, Phaethornis koepckeae
- Koepke's hairy-nosed bat, Mimon koepckeae
- Selva cacique, Cacicus koepckeae
- Sira curassow, Pauxi koepckeae
- Frost's iguana, Microlophus koepckeorum (genitive plural, named in honor of both Maria and her husband Hans-Wilhelm)
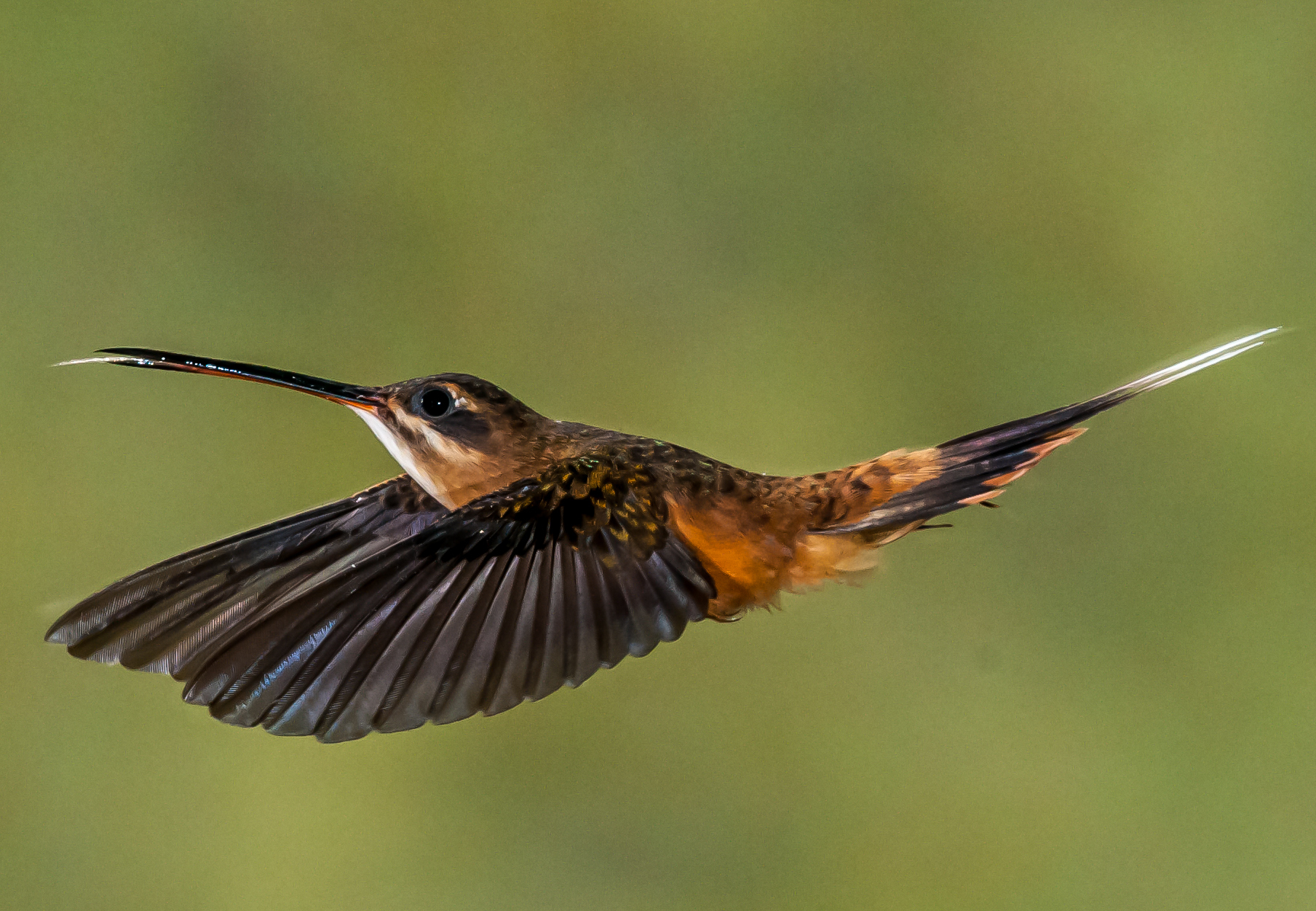
Koepke's Hermit Hummingbird

Range of Koepke's Hermit hummingbird (Phaethornis koepckeae)

Range of the Selva Cacique (Cacicus koepckeae)

Range of the Koepcke's Screech-owl (Megascops koepckeae)

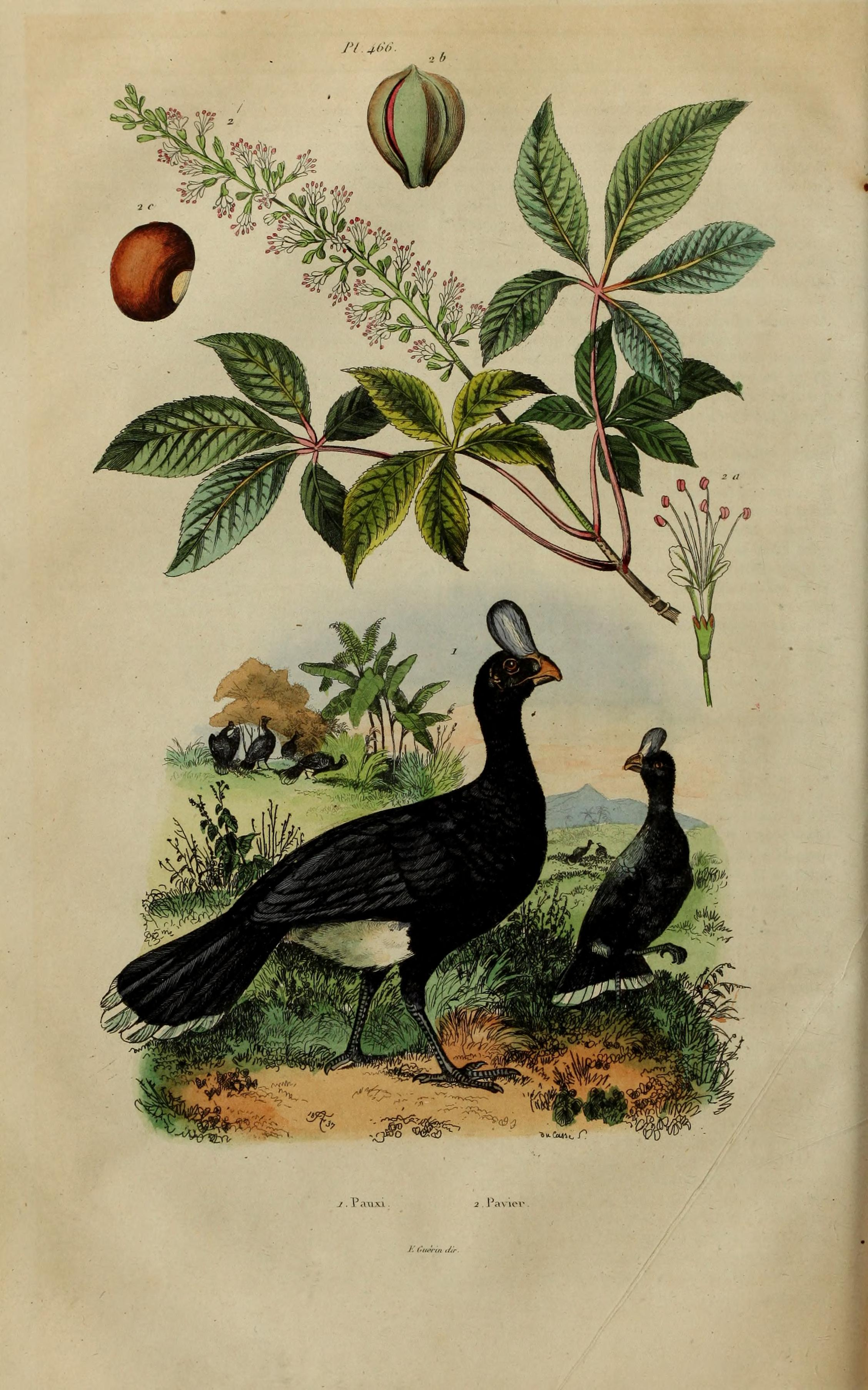
1838 illustration of the Sira curassow

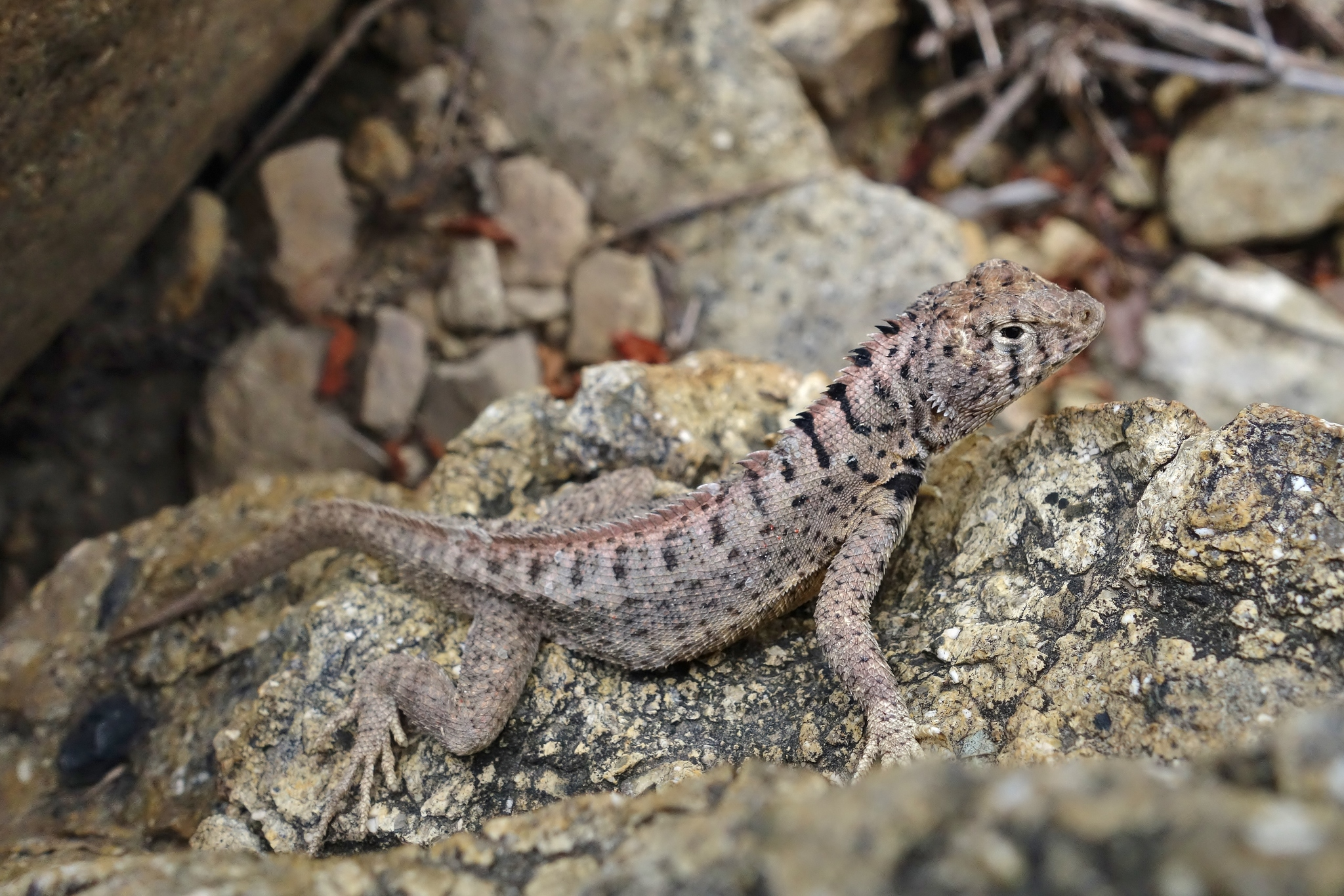
Frost's Iguana: named after Maria Koepcke and her husband
