= LANSA Flight 508 =

1971 aviation accident in Peru

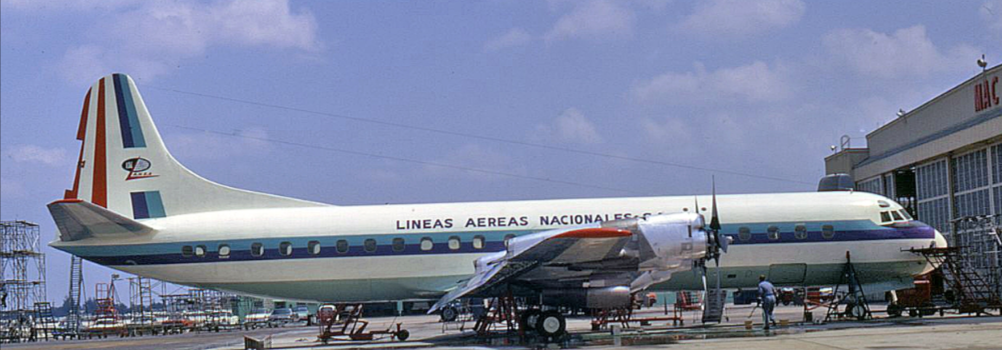
- A LANSA Lockheed L-188 Electra similar to the accident aircraft

Accident
- Date: 24 December 1971
- Summary: Crashed following a midair break-up in a thunderstorm
- Site: Puerto Inca, Peru

Aircraft
- Aircraft type: Lockheed L-188A Electra
- Operator: Líneas Aéreas Nacionales S.A. (LANSA)
- Registration: OB-R-941
- Flight origin: Jorge Chávez International Airport, Lima, Peru
- Stopover: Captain Rolden International Airport, Pucallpa, Peru
- Destination: Coronel FAP Francisco Secada Vignetta International Airport, Iquitos, Peru
- Occupants: 92
- Passengers: 86
- Crew: 6
- Fatalities: 91
- Injuries: 1
- Survivors: 1

LANSA Flight 508 was a Lockheed L-188A Electra turboprop operated as a scheduled domestic passenger flight by Lineas Aéreas Nacionales Sociedad Anonima (LANSA) that crashed in a thunderstorm en route from Lima to Pucallpa in Peru on 24 December 1971, killing 91 people – all 6 crew on board and 85 of its 86 passengers. As a result of a lightning bolt strike to the right-hand wing, the aircraft crashed down into the Amazon rainforest. Whilst several of the passengers initially survived the 3 km (2 mi) fall to earth, only one person, German Juliane Koepcke, was able to leave the crash site and hike for 11 days to safety. It is regarded in popular retellings as the deadliest lightning strike disaster in aviation history.

== Accident ==
Approximate flight path of OB-R-941

LANSA Flight 508 departed Lima’s Jorge Chávez International Airport shortly before noon on 24 December 1971 on its way to Iquitos in north-eastern Peru, with a scheduled stop at Pucallpa. Whilst cruising at FL210 (6.4 km or 4 mi) above mean sea level, the Lockheed L-188A Electra entered an area of severe thunderstorms and turbulence. Consequently, the aircraft was struck by lightning on its right wing. A fire broke out, and the aircraft suffered structural failure, with the right wing and part of the left wing separating in flight. Later analysis of the flight recorder indicated that the break-up occurred around 12:45, about fifteen minutes before the aircraft was due to land at Pucallpa. The aeroplane then crashed in flames into a jungle located in a mountainous terrain in the region of Puerto Inca.

=== Victims and sole survivor ===
The sole survivor was 17-year-old Juliane Koepcke, who whilst still strapped to her seat fell 3 km (2 mi) into the Amazon rainforest. She survived the fall with a broken collarbone, cruciate ligament tear in her left knee, deep laceration to her right arm, eye injury, and concussion. One hour after the fall, she gained her consciousness and was able to trek through the dense Amazon jungle for 11 days. She did not have anything to eat except a bag of candy that had fallen out of the plane. By following a stream, she eventually found shelter in a hut of local hunters and woodcutters, who found her and took her by canoe back to civilisation. By then, her upper arm wound had been severely affected by Botfly larvae (maggots).

As many as 14 other passengers were also later found to have survived the crash, but died awaiting rescue, including Koepcke's mother.

== Aftermath ==
Some evidence showed the crew decided to continue the flight despite the hazardous weather ahead, apparently because of pressure to meet the holiday schedule. Peruvian investigators concluded that the structural failure was caused by the extreme loads imposed while flying through the thunderstorm, compounded by stresses from a manoeuvre to level the aircraft; citing "intentional flight into hazardous weather conditions" as a cause of the crash. The Electra was LANSA's last aircraft; the company lost its operating permit eleven days later.

The sole survivor, Juliane Koepcke, later became the director of the Panguana Foundation, which works closely with local Indigenous communities to advocate for the conservation and protection of the Panguana region’s biodiversity.

== In popular culture ==
The movie Miracles Still Happen (1974) is based on the story. Koepcke's story was also told in the documentary film Wings of Hope (1998) by director Werner Herzog, who had narrowly avoided taking the same flight, when his reservation had been cancelled due to a last minute change in itinerary. In the film, Koepcke boards a flight from Lima to Pucallpa and sits on the same seat, 19F, as during the crash. Her unsentimental demeanour during the flight surprised many viewers. The film team later treks in Koepcke's footprints through the jungle, and finds debris from the plane previously undiscovered.

Koepcke's memoir Als ich vom Himmel fiel (English: When I Fell From the Sky) was published by the German publisher Piper Malik on 10 March 2011.

The crash also features in the final season one episode of the Discovery Channel documentary Aircrash Confidential. The episode was first aired in 2011, and features an interview with Koepcke.

The Swedish author Nils Bergeå includes a chapter on the LANSA flight 508 in his 2025 book Mirakulösa överlevare (Miraculous survivors).

== See also ==
- List of accidents and incidents involving commercial aircraft
- List of sole survivors of aviation accidents and incidents
- Braniff International Airways Flight 352, a similar wing-overload crash in the same type of aircraft caused when the crew attempted to fly through a severe thunderstorm. This incident might provide an alternative explanation of the cause for wing separation independent of a lightning strike, as severe turbulence caused by the storm and the crew's efforts to correct for it proved sufficient to overload the wing without prior structural damage due to fire.
