= Andrés Ruzo =

Geo scientist and conservationist

- Born: Andrés A. Ruzo
- Education: Southern Methodist University
- Occupation: Geothermal scientist
- Years active: 2011-present
- Known for: Boiling River Project
- Awards: National Geographic Young Explorer Grant (2016)

Andrés Ruzo is a geoscientist, conservationist, author, science communicator, and educator, who became the first scientist who was granted permission to study the Boiling River of the Amazon in 2011.

He has received multiple National Geographic Young Explorer Grants since 2010. He is married, and his wife also works as his field partner.

A tri-citizen, Ruzo grew up between Peru, Nicaragua, and the United States, all countries where he now has active projects. He holds degrees in geology and finance from Southern Methodist University (Dallas, TX), where he is currently finishing a Ph.D. in geophysics.

Ruzo is also the founder and director of the Boiling River Project, a non-profit dedicated to understanding and protecting the sacred Boiling River of the Amazon (i.e., the Shanay-Timpishka Geothermal System) by bringing together modern science, conservation economics, and traditional Amazonian knowledge.

Ruzo has been a National Geographic Explorer since 2010, receiving multiple grants for his projects in Perú. He has been featured on various NatGeo outlets, including the magazine, channel, and digital media. He was the Partnership Ambassador for the LEGO-NatGeo Partnership (which was released in summer 2017), He has served as a National Geographic Ambassador, visiting over 340 schools to educate students and teachers, and has keynoted over 300 NatGeo events. He has also hosted the award-winning National Geographic Latin America show Misterios del Inframundo (Mysteries of the Underworld).

Ruzo has been a TED Main Stage Speaker and TED Book Author. He has received various awards and recognitions from industry associations and conservation groups, including the Geothermal Resources Council, the American Association of Petroleum Geologists, and Greenpeace.

In 2022, Ruzo was named to The Explorers Club EC50, a recognition of fifty people "changing the world, the world needs to know about." He has led educational expeditions, including the inaugural The Explorers Club Teaching Fellowship expedition to the Boiling River in 2025.

Ruzo's scientific work, with over 50 collaborators from multiple disciplines and institutions, focuses on heat flow, geophysics, volcanology, geothermal system geochemistry, and geothermal extremophile life forms. His research contributions include co-authoring the SMU Geothermal Laboratory's heat flow map of the conterminous United States, a project supported by Google.org, which has been widely cited in geothermal resource assessments. His interdisciplinary research also extends to conservation biology, including published work on wildlife protection in the Amazon. His research has garnered over 300 citations in academic literature. Through his outreach efforts, including his TED talk which has received over 2.4 million views, Ruzo has introduced the Boiling River to an estimated 800 million people worldwide.

== Works ==
- The Boiling River: Adventure and Discovery in the Amazon. Simon & Schuster/TED. 2016. ISBN 978-1501119477.
