= Juliane Koepcke =

German mammalogist, sole survivor of LANSA Flight 508

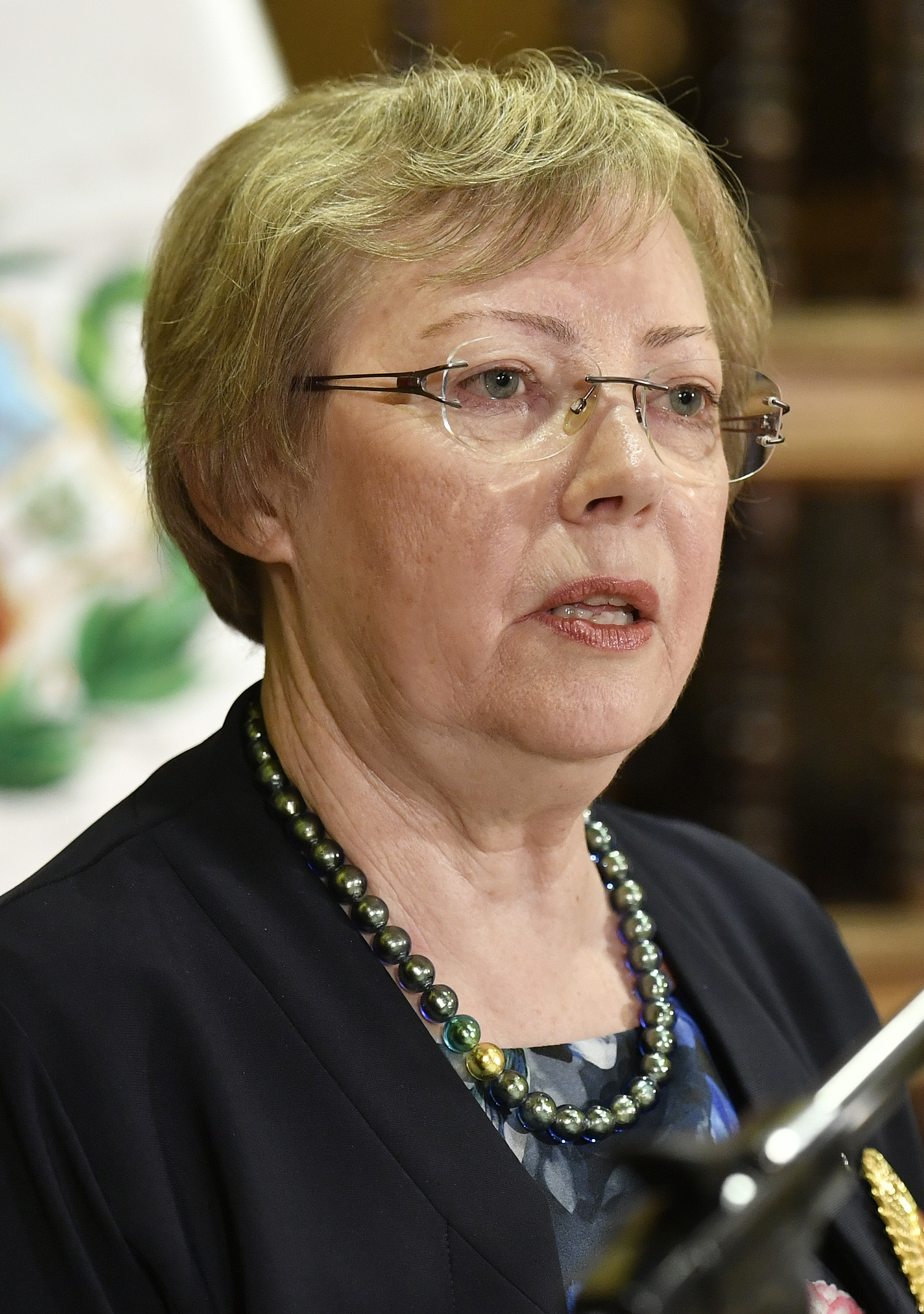
- Koepcke in April 2019
- Born: 10 October 1954 (age 72); Lima, Peru
- Occupation: Mammalogist
- Spouse: Erich Diller (m. 1989)
- Relatives: Hans-Wilhelm Koepcke (father); Maria Koepcke (mother)

Juliane Margaret Beate Koepcke (born 10 October 1954) is a German-Peruvian mammalogist who specialises in bats. She is the daughter of German zoologists Maria and Hans-Wilhelm Koepcke.

Koepcke is known for being the sole survivor of the 1971 LANSA Flight 508 crash. When the plane was struck by lightning, she fell 3,000 m (10,000 ft) while strapped to her seat and suffered numerous injuries including a concussion, broken collarbone, and a torn knee ligament. She survived 11 days alone in the Peruvian Amazon rainforest until she located a lumberjack camp.

== Early life ==
Koepcke was born in Lima, Peru, on 10 October 1954, the only child of German zoologists Maria (née von Mikulicz-Radecki; 1924–1971) and Hans-Wilhelm Koepcke (1914–2000). Her parents were working at Lima's Museum of Natural History when she was born. At the age of 14, she left Lima with her parents to establish the Panguana research station in the Amazon rainforest, where she learned survival skills. Educational authorities disapproved and she was required to return to the Deutsche Schule Lima Alexander von Humboldt to take her examinations, graduating on 23 December 1971.

== Plane crash ==
On 24 December 1971, just one day after she graduated, Koepcke flew on LANSA Flight 508. Her mother Maria had wanted Juliane to return to Panguana with her on 19 or 20 December, but Koepcke wanted to attend her graduation ceremony in Lima on 23 December. Maria agreed that they would stay for her graduation and instead they scheduled a flight for Christmas Eve. All flights were fully booked except for one with LANSA. Koepcke's father, Hans-Wilhelm, urged his wife to avoid flying with the airline due to its poor reputation. Nonetheless, the flight was booked. The plane was struck by lightning mid-flight and began to disintegrate before plummeting to the ground. Koepcke found herself falling, still strapped to her row of seats, 3,000 m (10,000 ft) into the Amazon rainforest.

Koepcke survived the fall but suffered injuries including a broken collarbone, a deep cut on her right arm, an eye injury, a ruptured ligament in her knee, and a concussion. She then spent 11 days in the rainforest, most of which she spent following a creek to a river. While in the jungle, she dealt with severe insect bites and an infestation of botfly larvae in her injured arm. After nine days, she was able to find an encampment that had been set up by local lumberjacks. A few hours later, the returning lumberjacks found her, poured gasoline onto her wound, and used a canoe to transport her for 11 hours to a more inhabited area. She was then airlifted to a hospital.

Koepcke's unlikely survival has been the subject of much speculation. Experts have said that she survived the fall because she was harnessed into her seat, the window seat, which was attached to the two seats to her left as part of a row of three. That was thought to have functioned as a parachute or helicopter which slowed her fall. The impact may have also been lessened by the updraft from a thunderstorm Koepcke fell through, as well as the thick foliage at her landing site. As many as 14 other passengers were later discovered to have survived the initial crash but died while waiting to be rescued.

== Aftermath ==
I had nightmares for a long time, for years, and of course the grief about my mother's death and that of the other people came back again and again. The thought "why was I the only survivor?" haunts me. It always will.

— Koepcke in 2010

After recovering from her injuries, Koepcke assisted search parties in locating the crash site and recovering the bodies of victims. Her mother's body was discovered on 12 January 1972.

Koepcke returned to her parents' native West Germany, where she fully recovered from her physical injuries. Like her parents, she studied biology at the University of Kiel and graduated in 1980. She received a doctorate from LMU Munich and returned to Peru to conduct research in mammalogy, specialising in bats. She published her thesis, "Ecological study of a bat colony in the tropical rain forest of Peru", in 1987.

In 1989, Koepcke married Erich Diller, a German entomologist who specialises in parasitic wasps. In 2000, following the death of her father, she took over as the director of Panguana. She served as a librarian at the Bavarian State Collection of Zoology in Munich.

Koepcke's autobiography Als ich vom Himmel fiel: Wie mir der Dschungel mein Leben zurückgab (German for When I Fell from the Sky: How the Jungle Gave Me My Life Back) was released in 2011 by Piper Verlag. The book won that year's Corine Literature Prize. In 2019, the government of Peru made her a Grand Officer of the Order of Merit for Distinguished Services.

== Portrayal in media ==
Koepcke's survival has been the subject of numerous books and films, including the low-budget and heavily fictionalized I miracoli accadono ancora (1974) by Italian filmmaker Giuseppe Maria Scotese, which was released in English as Miracles Still Happen and is sometimes called The Story of Juliane Koepcke. She was portrayed by English actress Susan Penhaligon in the film.

Koepcke's story was more faithfully told by Koepcke herself in German filmmaker Werner Herzog's documentary Wings of Hope (1998). Herzog was interested in telling her story because of a personal connection: He was scheduled to be on the same flight while scouting locations for his film Aguirre, the Wrath of God (1972), but a last-minute change of plans spared him from the crash. He had planned to make the film ever since narrowly missing the flight but was unable to contact Koepcke for decades because she avoided the media; he located her after contacting the priest who performed her mother's funeral. Koepcke accompanied him on a visit to the crash site, which she described as a "kind of therapy" for her.

Franz Lidz described Koepcke as one of his most interesting interview subjects, noting that she was initially reluctant to participate, until Lidz convinced her he "just wanted to write about the science of it, rather than focusing on the childhood trauma".

== Works ==
- Koepcke, Juliane (1987). Ökologische Studien an einer Fledermaus-Artengemeinschaft im tropischen Regenwald von Peru [Ecological studies on a bat community in the tropical rainforest of Peru.] (Thesis) (in German). Ludwig-Maximilians-Universität München.
- Koepcke, Juliane (2011). Als ich vom Himmel fiel: Wie mir der Dschungel mein Leben zurückgab [When I Fell from the Sky: How the Jungle Gave Me My Life Back] (in German). Munich: Piper Malik. ISBN 978-3-89029-389-9.

== See also ==
- Ivan Chisov, Soviet airman who survived falling from his aeroplane in 1942
- Alan Magee, American airman who survived falling from his aeroplane in 1943
- Nicholas Alkemade, British airman who survived falling from his aeroplane in 1944
- Vesna Vulović, Serbian flight attendant who survived the mid-air breakup of JAT Flight 367 in 1972
- Larisa Savitskaya, Soviet woman who was the sole survivor of Aeroflot Flight 811 in 1981
- List of aviation accidents and incidents with a sole survivor
