= Hans-Wilhelm Koepcke =

German zoologist, ornithologist, and herpetologist

- Hans-Wilhelm Koepcke ca. 1980
- Born: 13 June 1914; Saatzig, Pomerania, German Empire
- Died: 21 November 2000 (aged 86); Hamburg, Germany
- Occupations: Zoologist, ornithologist, herpetologist
- Spouse: Maria Koepcke
- Children: Juliane Koepcke Diller

Hans-Wilhelm Koepcke (13 June 1914 – 21 November 2000) was a German zoologist, ornithologist, and herpetologist. He was married to ornithologist Maria Koepcke, and was the father of mammalogist Juliane Koepcke.

== Scientific work in Peru ==
Koepcke studied at the University of Kiel, Germany, earning a doctorate in Natural Sciences in 1947. He then traveled to Peru where he started work at the Javier Prado Museum of Natural History in Lima, an institution affiliated with the National University of San Marcos.

Along with his wife Maria, whom he met at the University of Kiel and later married in Peru, he spent much of his life studying the Peruvian and South American fauna. He co-authored with Maria many scientific publications, mostly ornithological. His greatest individual academic accomplishment was the publication (in German) of the 1,684 page two volume opus entitled Die Lebensformen: Grundlagen zu einer universell gültigen biologischen Theorie (Life Forms: The basis for a universally valid biological theory), in 1971 and 1973. According to François Vuilleumier, curator of the Department of Ornithology, American Museum of Natural History in New York City:

The number of topics covered in this monumental work (volume 1, pages 1–789; volume 2, pages 790–1,684) is simply astonishing, and includes the concept of adaptation, death of individuals and of species, homology, systematics, ecological specialization, teleology, convergences, social signalization, mimicry, sexuality, mating systems, and many others. Richly illustrated, this work draws its empirical examples from many forms of life, where birds, and Peruvian or South American birds especially, figure prominently.

On 24 December 1971, Koepcke's wife Maria was killed in the crash of LANSA Flight 508 in the Peruvian Amazon rainforest. Their daughter, Juliane, who was on the flight with her mother, was the sole survivor of the crash, having fallen from 3,000 m (10,000 ft) still strapped into her seat. Injured, Juliane Koepcke survived 11 days hiking without food until she was rescued.

== Return to Germany ==
After returning from Peru to West Germany, Koepcke lived in Hamburg, where he worked at the herpetology department and taught zoology at the Zoological Institute and Museum of the University of Hamburg.

== Eponyms ==
A species of Peruvian lizard, Microlophus koepckeorum, is named in honor of him and his wife.
