= Kamenice Gorge =

Coordinates: 50°52′10″N 14°16′7″E

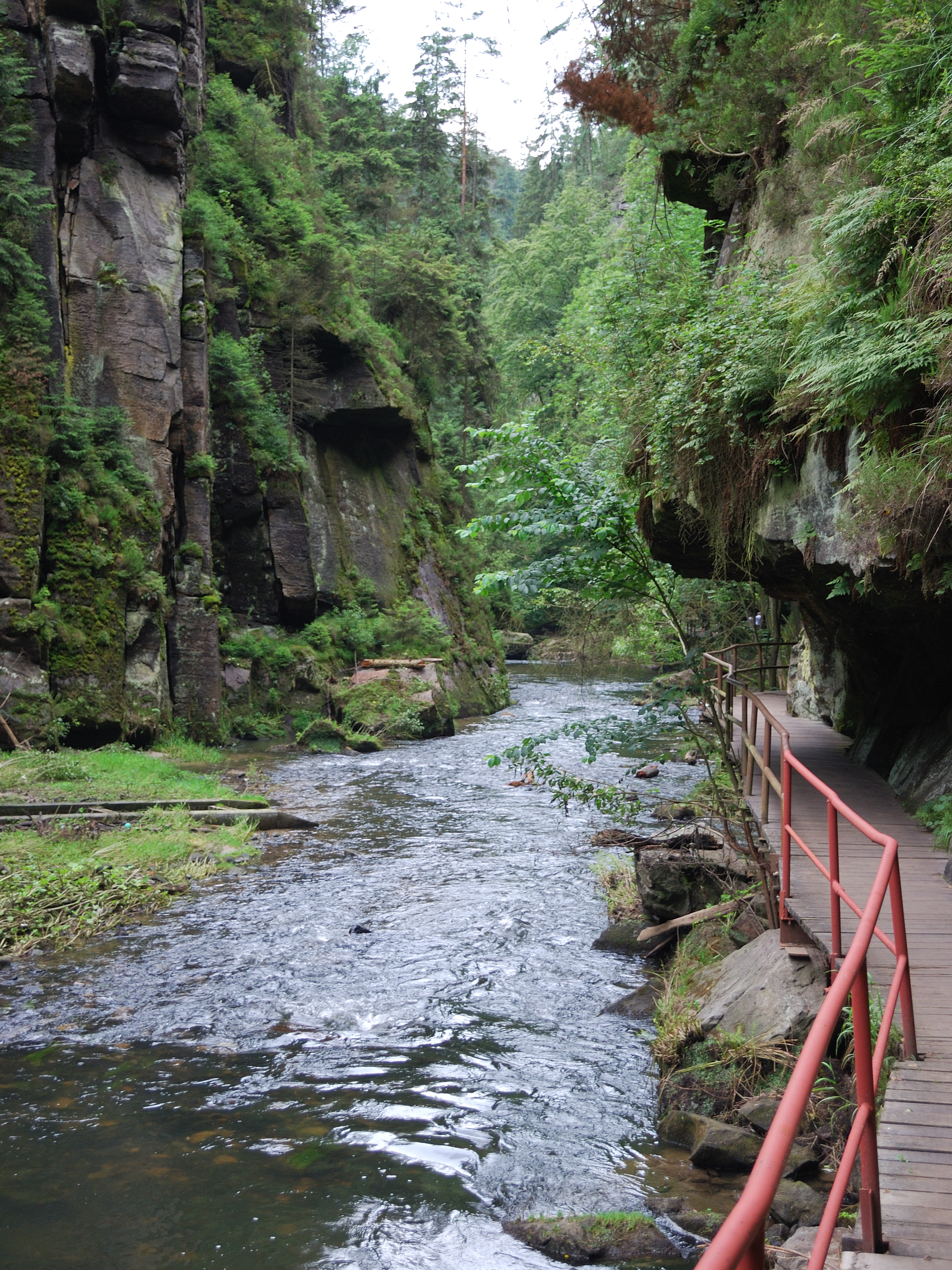
Edmund Gorge

The Kamenice Gorge (formerly also known as Kamnitz Gorge; Czech: soutěsky Kamenice, German: Kamnitzklamm) is a rocky ravine of the Kamenice River in the Ústí nad Labem Region of the Czech Republic. Located within the Bohemian Switzerland National Park, it is one of the main tourist destinations of the region.

== Geography ==
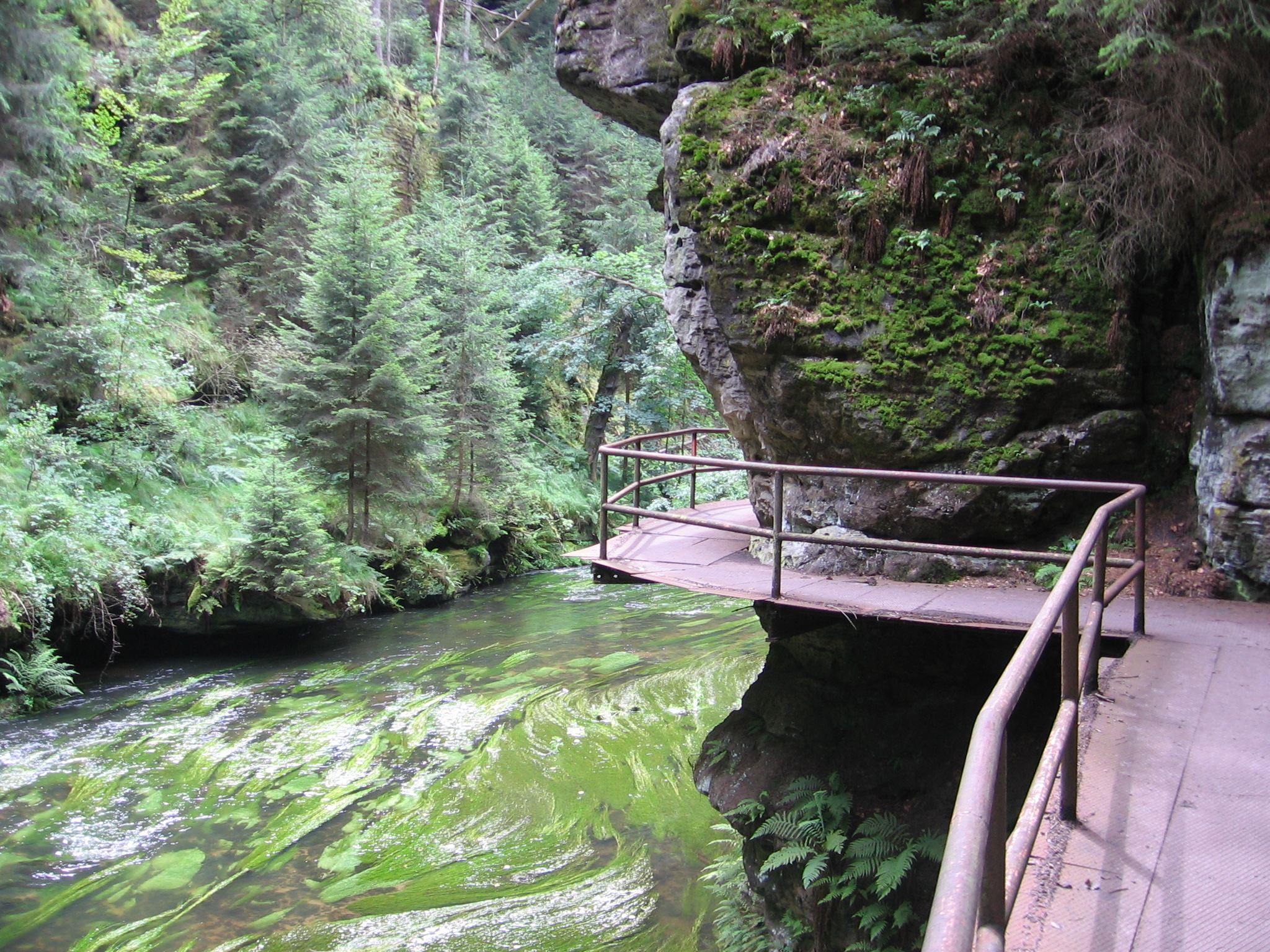
Wild Gorge

The gorge is located about 12 kilometres (7 mi) northeast of Děčín, in the southwestern part of the Bohemian Switzerland National Park. It extends into the municipal territories of Srbská Kamenice, Růžová, Jetřichovice and Hřensko. The Kamenice River flows through the canyon and then discharges into the Elbe in Hřensko. The gorge is located at an altitude of 125–200 m.

== Tourism ==
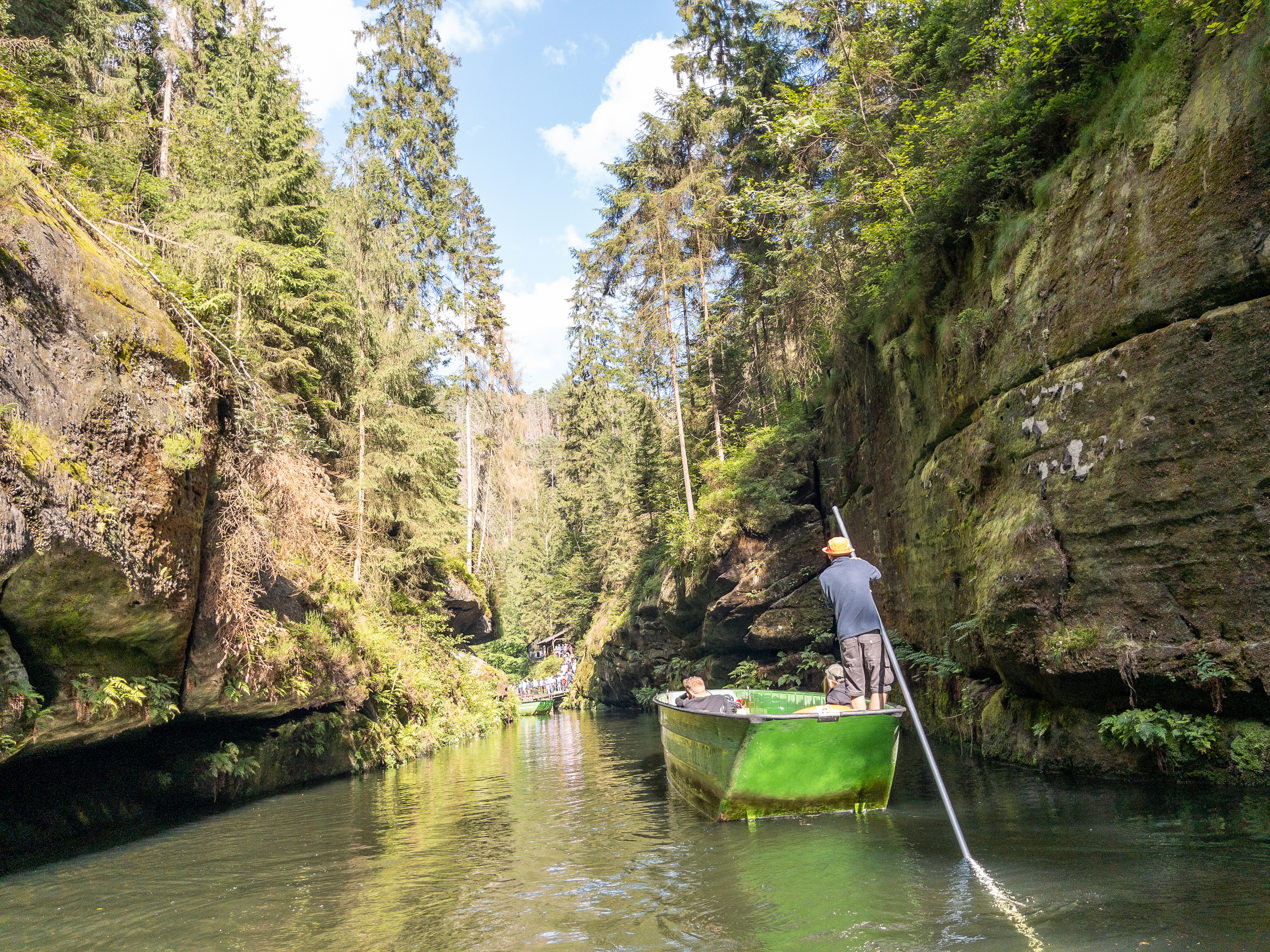
Boat transport

There are three navigation sections in the gorge: Edmund Gorge (Czech: Edmundova soutěska; also called Quiet Gorge or Tichá soutěska), Wild Gorge (Divoká soutěska) and Ferdinand Gorge (Ferdinandova soutěska), but only the first two are open to tourists. The operation is carried out by ferrymen who steer the ship with a tiller. The Wild Gorge represents the most valuable and best preserved part of the Bohemian Switzerland National Park.

The navigation section of the Wild Gorge is currently about 450 m (1,480 ft) long and the navigation takes about 15 minutes. The Edmund Gorge is about 900 m (3,000 ft) long and the navigation takes 20 minutes. The gorges are connected by a 1.5 km (0.9 mi) long pedestrian path.

== History ==
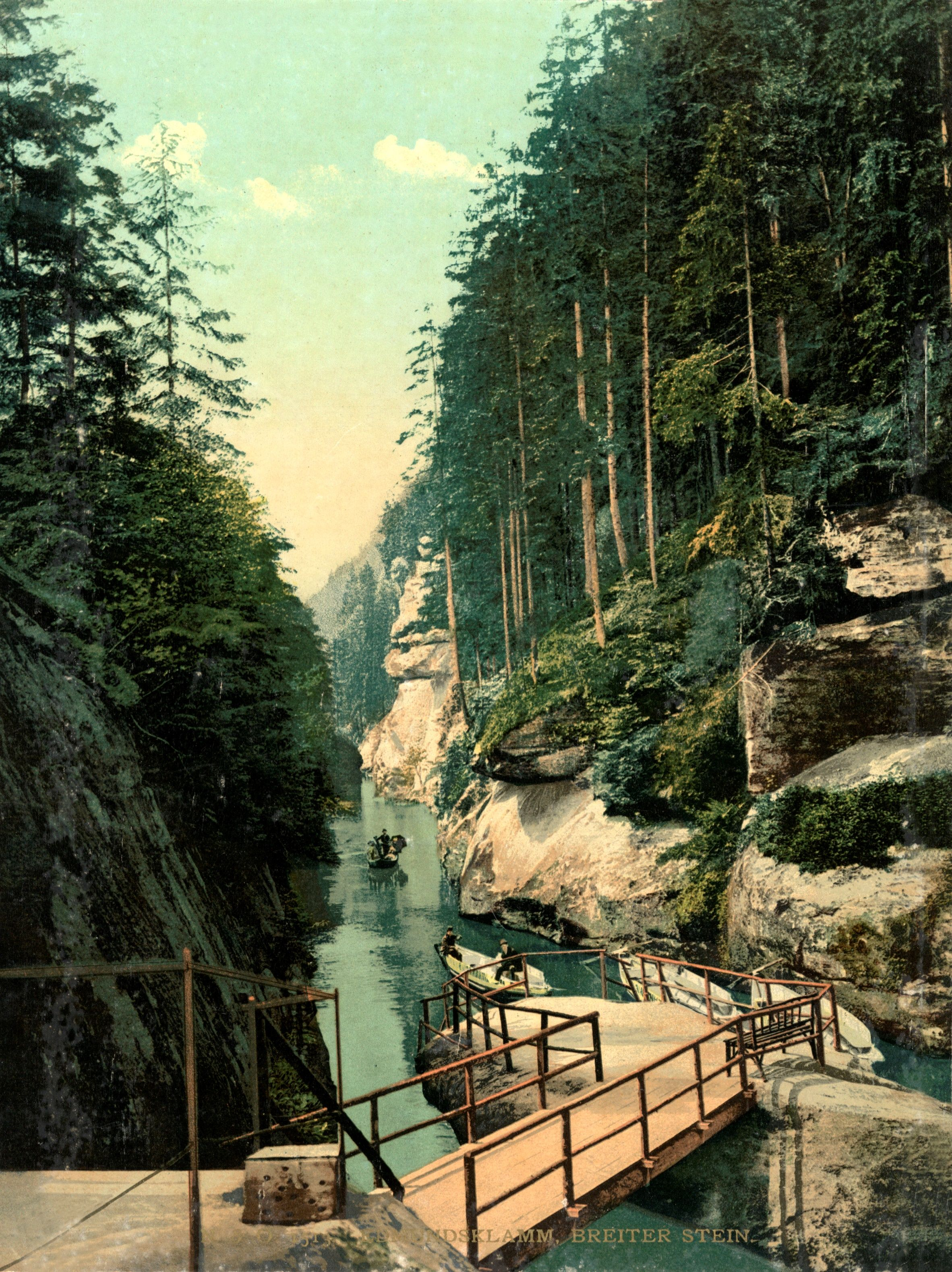
Edmund Gorge in c. 1900

The Kamenice Gorge was formed in the Tertiary period when the sea receded and volcanic activity caused the sandstone layers to break into many pieces. Wind and water erosion then created unique rock formations. For people who lived near the river, the gorge represented of an obstacle that they had to overcome, but the Kamenice River was also used here for fishing and wood transportation.

The Kamenice Gorge was first travelled in 1877, when five adventurers bet that they would cross the gorge on a wooden raft. This event was the beginning of the use of the gorge for tourist purposes. From the 1880s, Prince Edmund Clary-Aldringen spent money to make the area accessible and called in Italian experts to help with the construction work. Under their leadership, two hundred workers carved out pedestrian tunnels in the sandstone. In 1881, first of the navigation sections (Ferdinand Gorge) was opened to the public. Tourists were travelling on a 2 km long section from Srbská Kamenice to the Dolský mlýn watermill, but the journey was only one-way. The Edmund Gorge was opened in 1890 and subsequently a restaurant was built here. The Wild Gorge followed in 1898. Originally, the Edmund Gorge was about 500 m (1,600 ft) long and the Wild Gorge was 250 m (820 ft) long. There was great interest in the place and at the beginning of the 20th century an average of 160,000 people visited it. Fourteen boats transported tourists in the Edmund Gorge, and seven boats in the Wild Gorge.

Due to strong currents and the difficulty of transporting ships back, operations on the Ferdinand Gorge were cancelled in 1939. A reconstruction of the Edmund and Wild gorges took place in 1964.

== Nature ==
The gorge contains vegetation that usually grows in mountainous regions.
