= Svor =

- Municipality
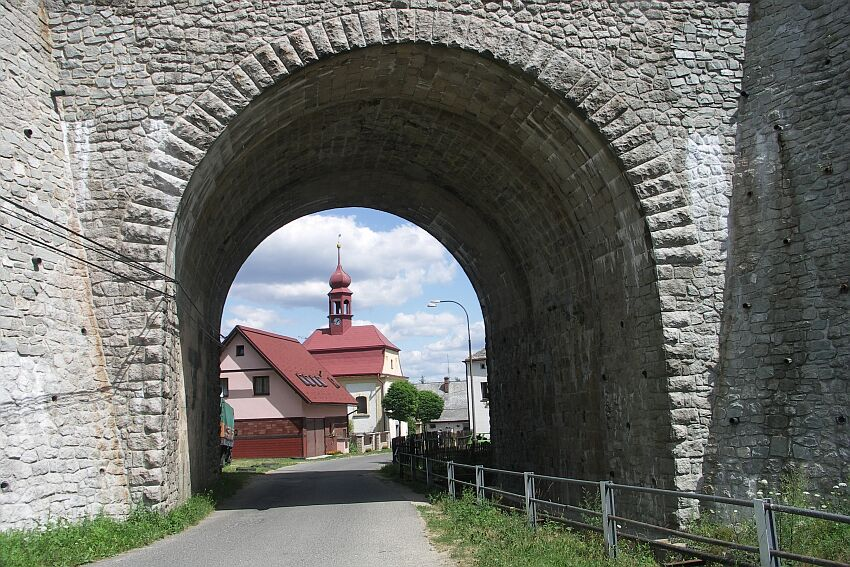
- Underpass in Svor

- Flag Coat of arms

- Location in the Czech Republic
- Coordinates: 50°47′31″N 14°35′49″E
- Country: Czech Republic
- Region: Liberec
- District: Česká Lípa
- First mentioned: 1395

Area
  - Total: 18.02 km^{2} (6.96 sq mi)
- Elevation: 435 m (1,427 ft)

Population (2026-01-01)
  - Total: 720
  - Density: 40/km^{2} (100/sq mi)
- Time zone: UTC+1 (CET)
  - Summer (DST): UTC+2 (CEST)
- Postal code: 471 51
- Website: www.obecsvor.cz

Svor is a municipality and village in Česká Lípa District in the Liberec Region of the Czech Republic. It has about 700 inhabitants.

== Administrative division ==
Svor consists of two municipal parts (in brackets population according to the 2021 census):

- Svor (577)
- Rousínov (54)

== Geography ==
The Kamenice River originates in the municipal territory.

== Demographics ==
Historical population
Year	Pop.	±%
1869	1,567	—
1880	1,650	+5.3%
1890	1,753	+6.2%
1900	1,842	+5.1%
1910	1,920	+4.2%
1921	1,702	−11.4%
1930	1,763	+3.6%
1950	825	−53.2%
1961	875	+6.1%
1970	770	−12.0%
1980	638	−17.1%
1991	559	−12.4%
2001	624	+11.6%
2011	628	+0.6%
2021	631	+0.5%
Source: Censuses
