= Kamenice (Elbe) =

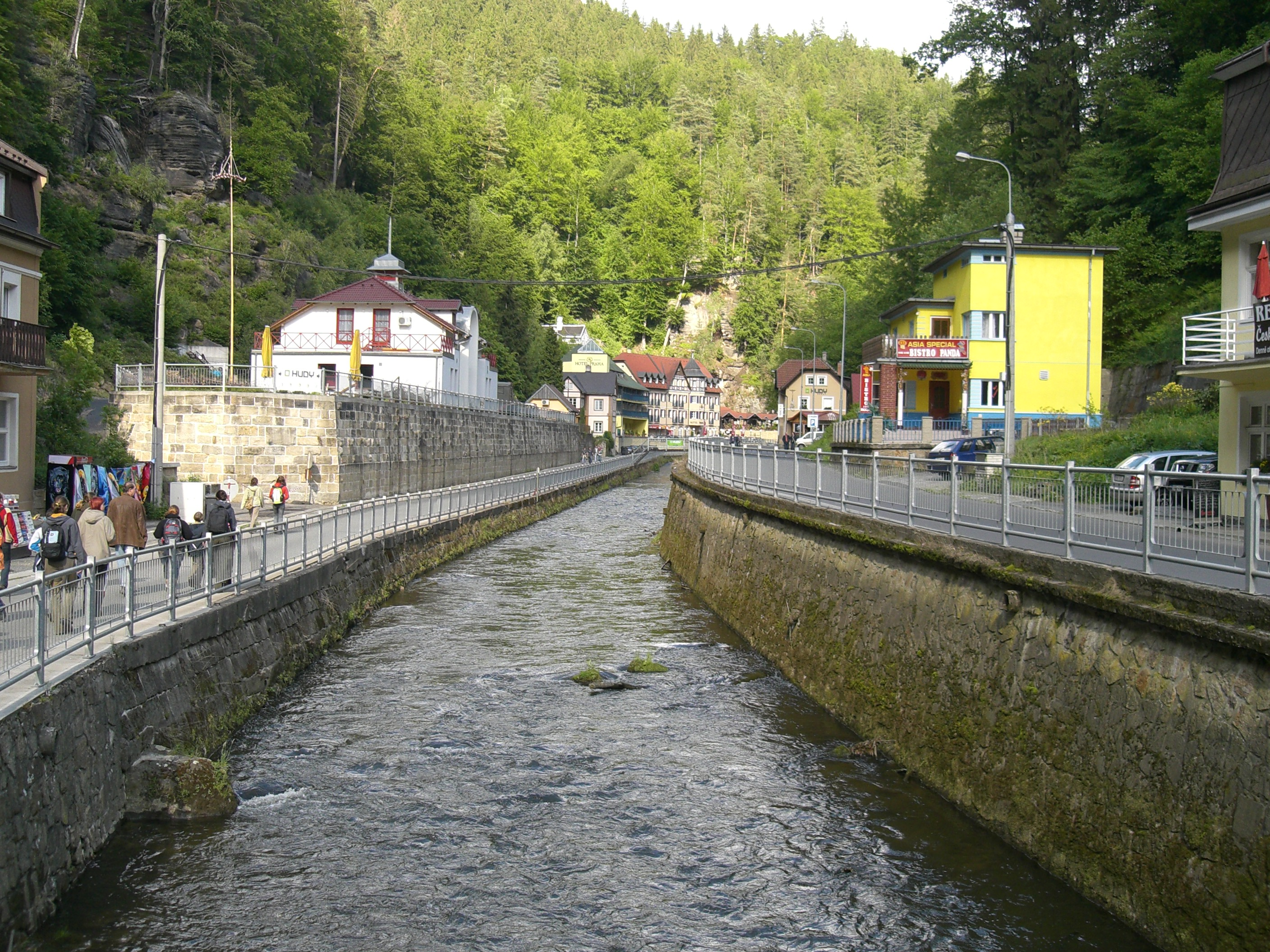
- The Kamenice in Hřensko

Location
- Country: Czech Republic
- Regions: Ústí nad Labem; Liberec

Physical characteristics
- Source
  - location: Svor, Lusatian Mountains
  - coordinates: 50°50′17″N 14°34′16″E
  - elevation: 576 m (1,890 ft)
- Mouth
  - location: Elbe
  - coordinates: 50°52′27″N 14°14′10″E
  - elevation: 119 m (390 ft)
- Length: 37.7 km (23.4 mi)
- Basin size: 217.2 km^{2} (83.9 sq mi)
- Discharge
  - average: 2.7 m^{3}/s (95 cu ft/s) near estuary

Basin features
- Progression: Elbe→ North Sea

The Kamenice (German: Kamnitz) is a river in the Czech Republic, a right tributary of the Elbe River. It originates in the Liberec Region, but flows mostly through the Ústí nad Labem Region. It is 37.7 km (23.4 mi) long.

== Etymology ==
Kamenice is a common Czech toponym. The name is derived from the Czech word kamenný, i.e. 'stony'. The river was named after the character of the river bed. The river is sometimes called Hřenská Kamenice to distinguish it from the eponymous rivers in the country.

== Characteristic ==
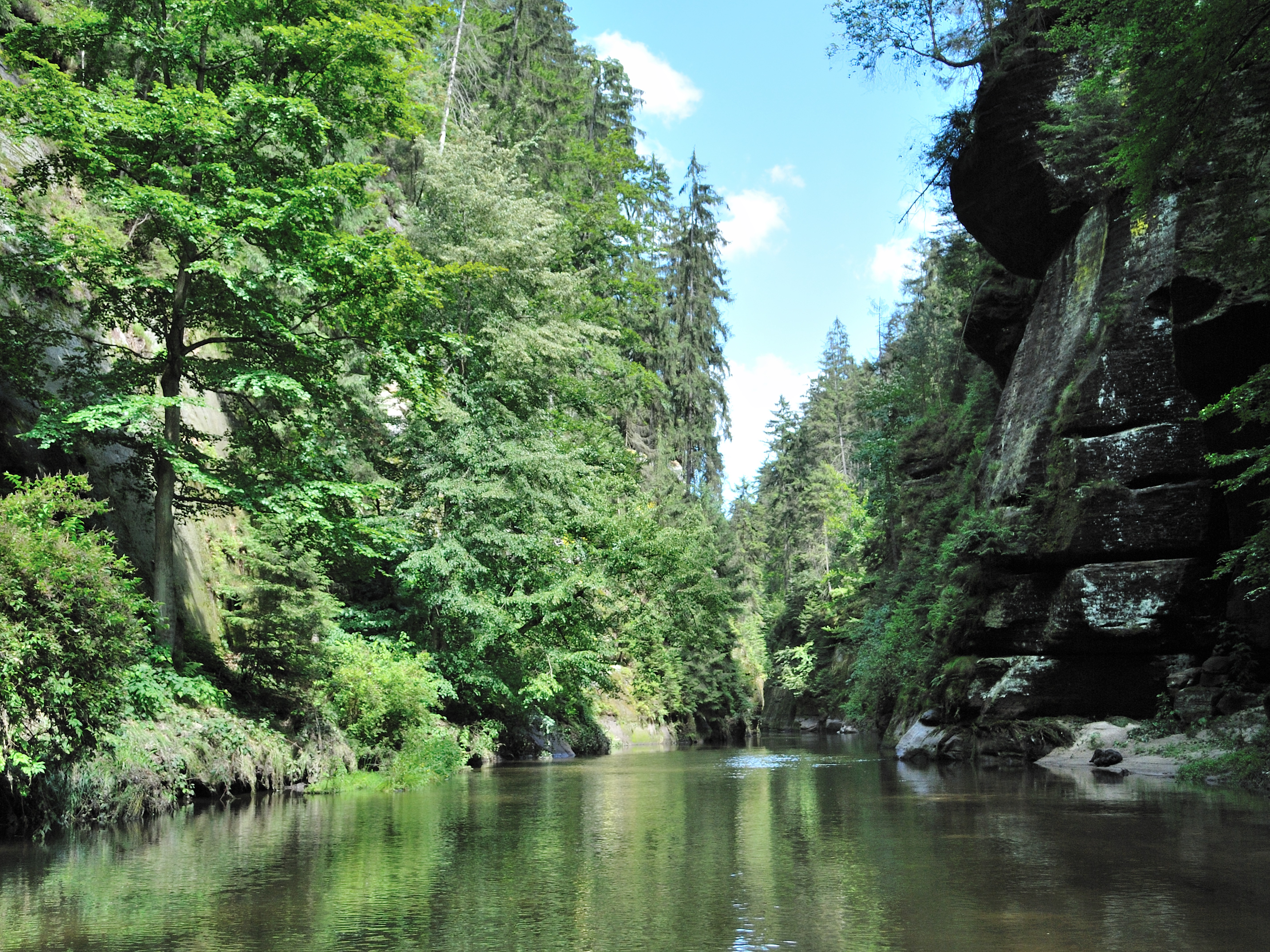
The Kamenice Gorge

The Kamenice originates in the territory of Svor in the Lusatian Mountains at an elevation of 576 m (1,890 ft) and flows to Hřensko, where it enters the Elbe River at an elevation of 119 m (390 ft). It is 37.7 km (23.4 mi) long. Its drainage basin has an area of 217.2 km^{2} (83.9 sq mi). The average discharge at its mouth is 2.7 m3/s.

The longest tributaries of the Kamenice are:

Tributary	Length (km)	Side
Chřibská Kamenice	23.5	right
Olešnička	8.0	left
Bynovecký potok	7.8	left

== Course ==
The river flows through the municipal territories of Svor, Kytlice, Prysk, Česká Kamenice, Janská, Srbská Kamenice, Jetřichovice, Růžová and Hřensko.

== Fauna ==
Atlantic salmon, which were exterminated in the Czech Republic in the 1920s, have been reintroduced into the river. Efforts to restore it have been ongoing since 1998.

== Tourism ==
The Kamenice flows through the national park of Bohemian Switzerland. Among the best preserved and most valuable parts of the national park is the Kamenice Gorge. Punt rides are organized for tourists. The gorge belongs to the most visited tourist destinations of the region and to the most visited natural tourist destinations in the entire Czech Republic.

Due to the location in the national park, individual sailing on the river is prohibited.

== See also ==
- List of rivers of the Czech Republic
