= Hřensko =

- Municipality
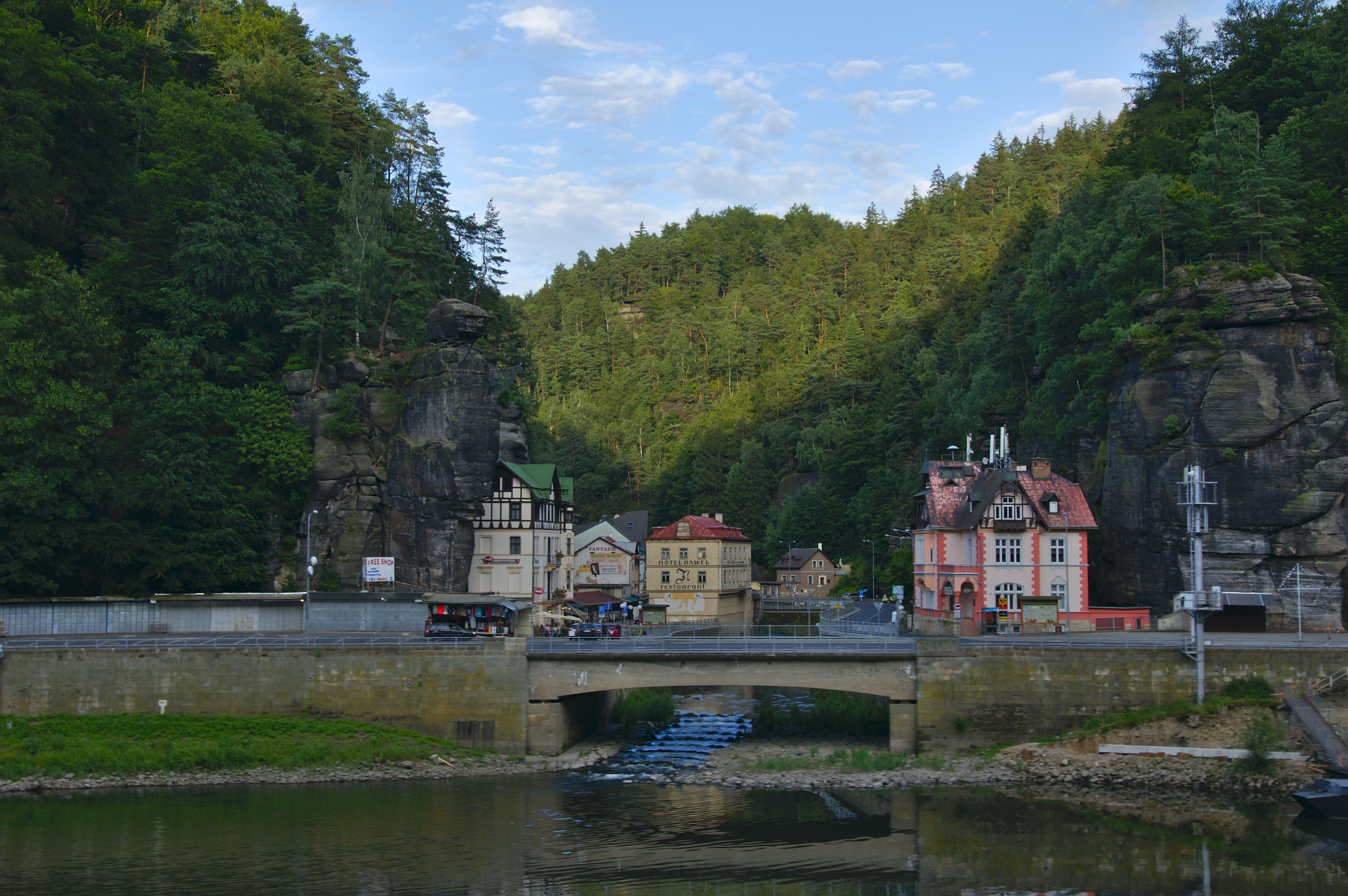
- Confluence of the Elbe and Kamenice rivers

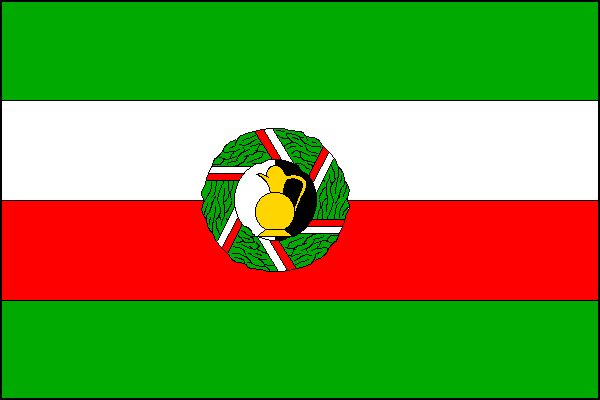
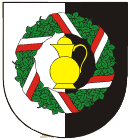
- Flag Coat of arms

- Location in the Czech Republic
- Coordinates: 50°52′28″N 14°14′33″E
- Country: Czech Republic
- Region: Ústí nad Labem
- District: Děčín
- First mentioned: 1488

Area
  - Total: 19.86 km^{2} (7.67 sq mi)
- Elevation: 130 m (430 ft)

Population (2026-01-01)
  - Total: 251
  - Density: 12.6/km^{2} (32.7/sq mi)
- Time zone: UTC+1 (CET)
  - Summer (DST): UTC+2 (CEST)
- Postal code: 407 17
- Website: www.hrensko.cz

Hřensko (Czech pronunciation: [ˈɦr̝ɛnsko]; German: Herrnskretschen) is a municipality and village in Děčín District in the Ústí nad Labem Region of the Czech Republic. It has about 300 inhabitants. With an elevation of 130 metres (430 ft) above sea level, it is the lowest municipality in the country. Located on the edge of the Bohemian Switzerland National Park, Hřensko is known for many natural monuments, especially for the Kamenice Gorge and Pravčická brána.

== Administrative division ==
Hřensko consists of two municipal parts (in brackets population according to the 2021 census):

- Hřensko (175)
- Mezná (49)

== Etymology ==
Before the establishment of the village, there was a pub below the Hornichen mountain called Horniss Kraczmer. The possessive adjective gradually distorted (Hörniß-, Herniß-, Herns-) and was then adopted into Czech as Hřen- with the suffix of place names -sko.

== Geography ==
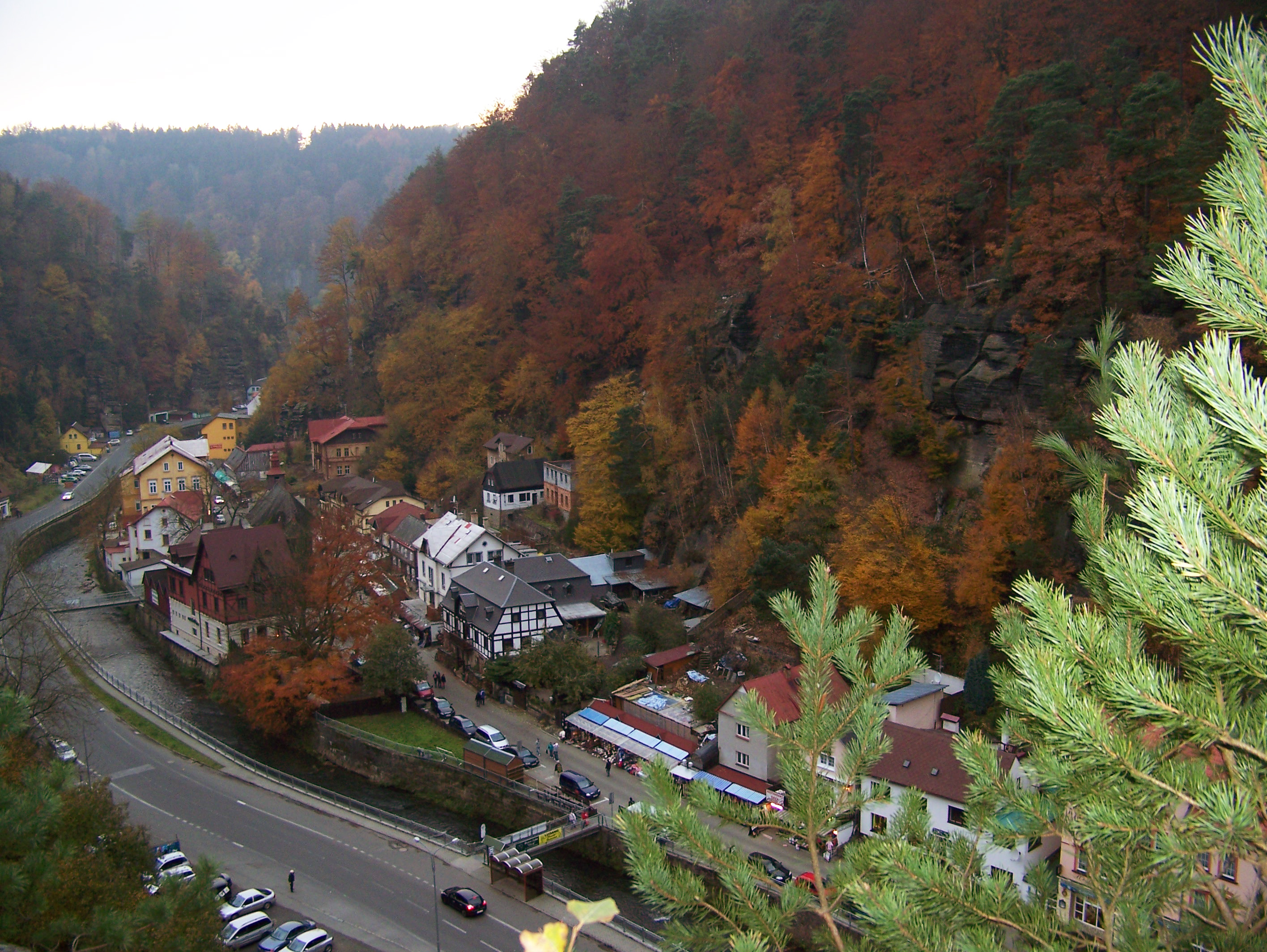
View of Hřensko in the Elbe valley

Hřensko is located about 11 kilometres (7 mi) north of Děčín and 27 km (17 mi) northeast of Ústí nad Labem. It lies on the border with Germany and is adjacent to Bad Schandau and Schöna. It lies in the Elbe Sandstone Mountains. Most of the municipality lies in the Bohemian Switzerland National Park. The highest point of the municipality is Oltářní kámen at 469 m (1,539 ft) above the sea.

Hřensko is situated at the confluence of the Kamenice and Elbe rivers, in the Elbe valley. In the municipal territory is located the lowest point of the Czech Republic, which is the Elbe on the border with Germany at 115 m (377 ft) above sea level.

== History ==
Hřensko was established during the 15th century as a trading settlement.

== Demographics ==
Historical population

Year	Pop.	±%
1869	1,060	—
1880	1,108	+4.5%
1890	1,088	−1.8%
1900	1,132	+4.0%
1910	1,117	−1.3%

Year	Pop.	±%
1921	914	−18.2%
1930	904	−1.1%
1950	311	−65.6%
1961	266	−14.5%
1970	270	+1.5%

Year	Pop.	±%
1980	285	+5.6%
1991	199	−30.2%
2001	247	+24.1%
2011	266	+7.7%
2021	224	−15.8%

Source: Censuses

== Transport ==
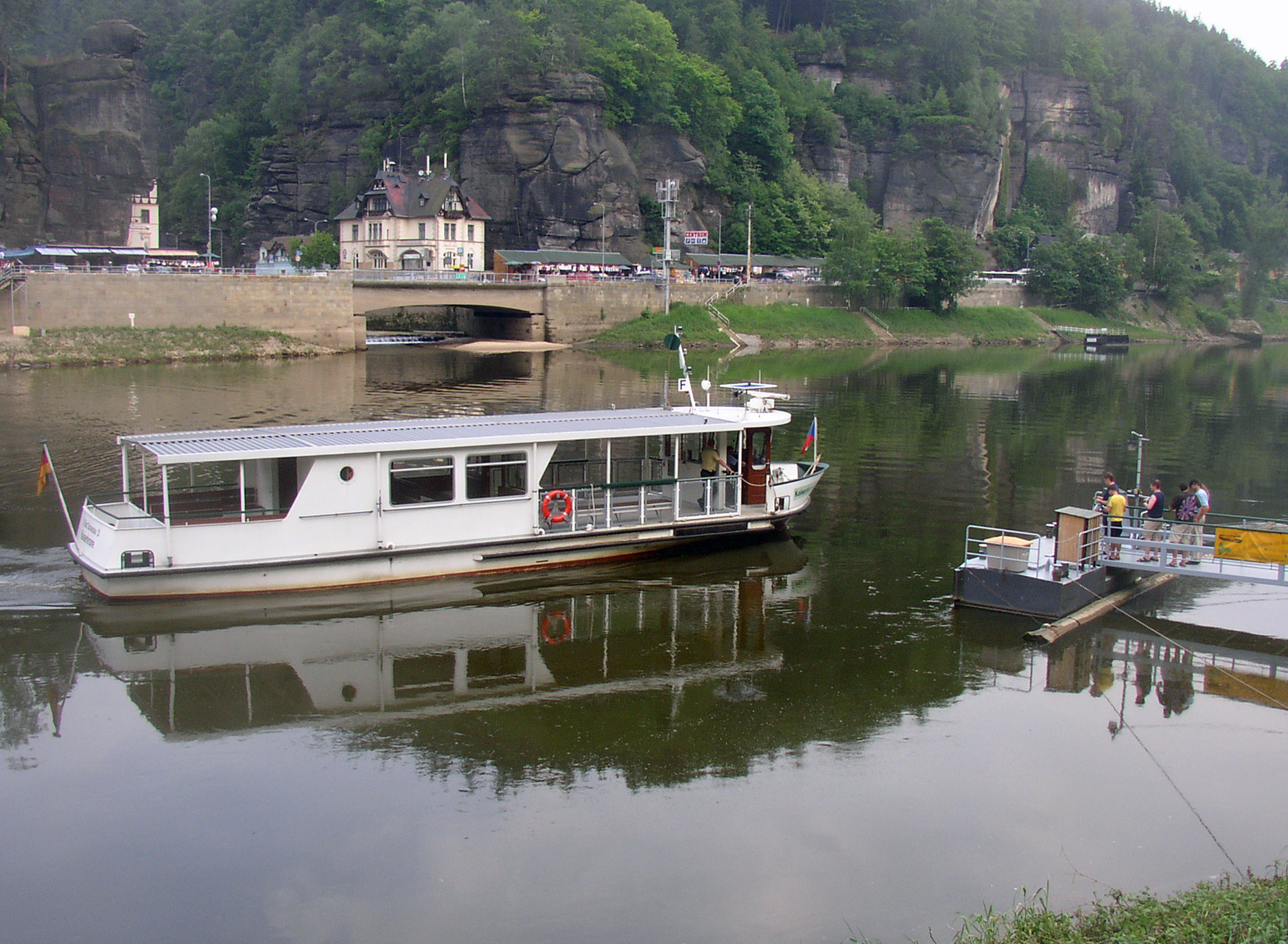
Ferry and the river border crossing on the Elbe

The I/62 road from Ústí nad Labem to the Czech–German border passes through the municipality. There are two border crossings in Hřensko: the road border crossing Hřensko / Schmilka and the river border crossing Hřensko / Schöna.

== Sights ==
The municipality is a portal to the Bohemian Switzerland National Park. The main attractions in the municipal territory are the Kamenice Gorge and Pravčická brána, the largest natural stone bridge in Europe. They are among the most visited nature tourist destinations in the entire country.

The main cultural landmark of Hřensko is the Church of Saint John of Nepomuk. It was built in the late Baroque style in 1786–1787.

== In popular culture ==
Pravčická brána was featured in the film The Chronicles of Narnia: The Lion, the Witch and the Wardrobe.

== Notable people ==
- Erich Clar (1902–1987), German chemist
