= Malá Pravčická brána =

Natural sandstone arch in Bohemian Switzerland

Coordinates: 50°52′18″N 14°21′00″E

Malá Pravčická Brána

The Malá Pravčická Brána (German: Kleines Prebischtor) is a natural sandstone arch that is about 2.3 m (7.5 ft) high and 3.3 m (11 ft) wide. It is located in Bohemian Switzerland near the red-marked main hiking route (E3 European long-distance path) between Mezní Louka and Vysoká Lípa.

Its name is derived from the nearby Pravčická brána in the Winterberg area, the largest natural sandstone arch in Europe.
