= Pravčická brána =

Rock formation in Bohemian Switzerland, Czech Republic

Coordinates: 50°53′1.59″N 14°16′53.46″E

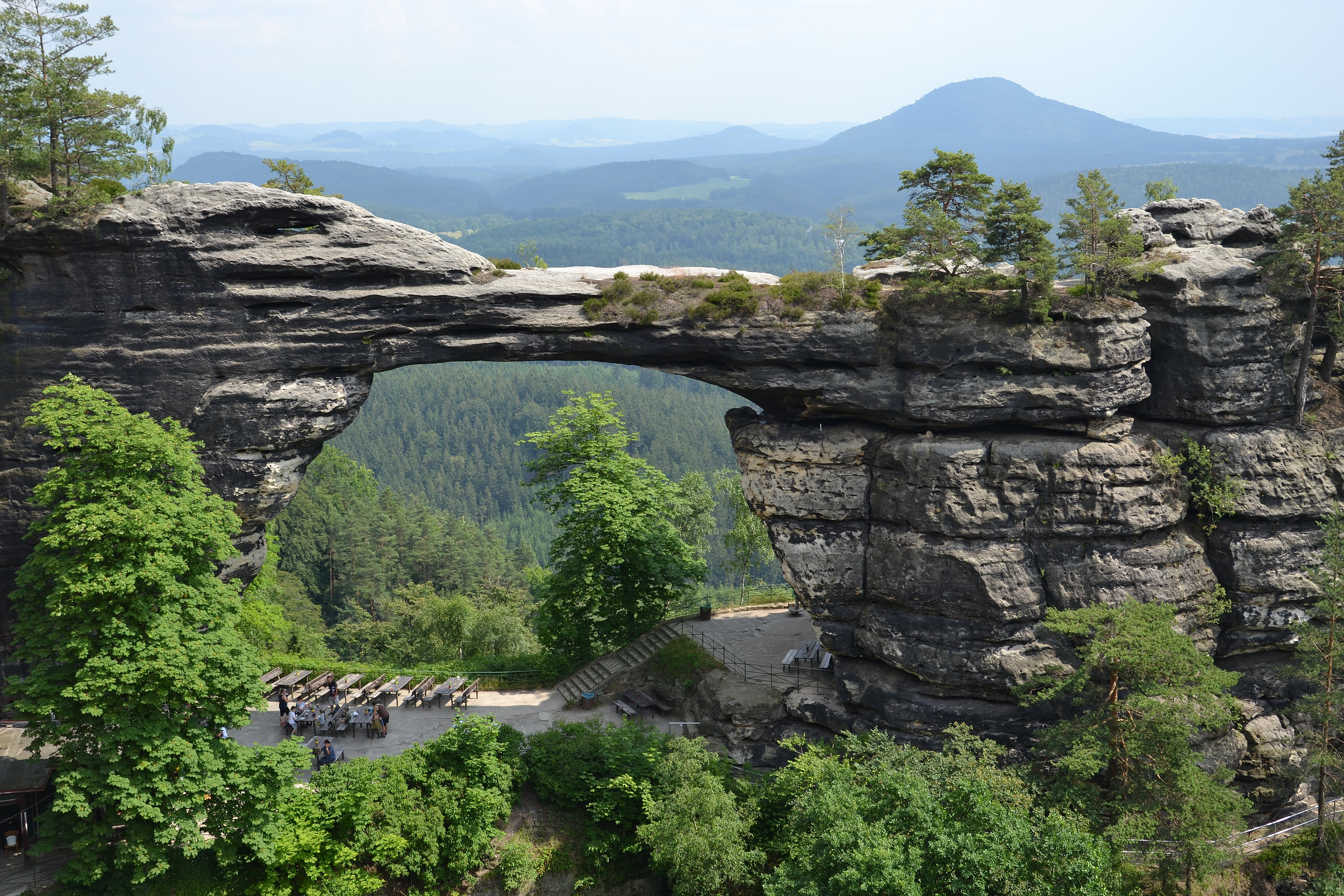
View of Pravčická brána

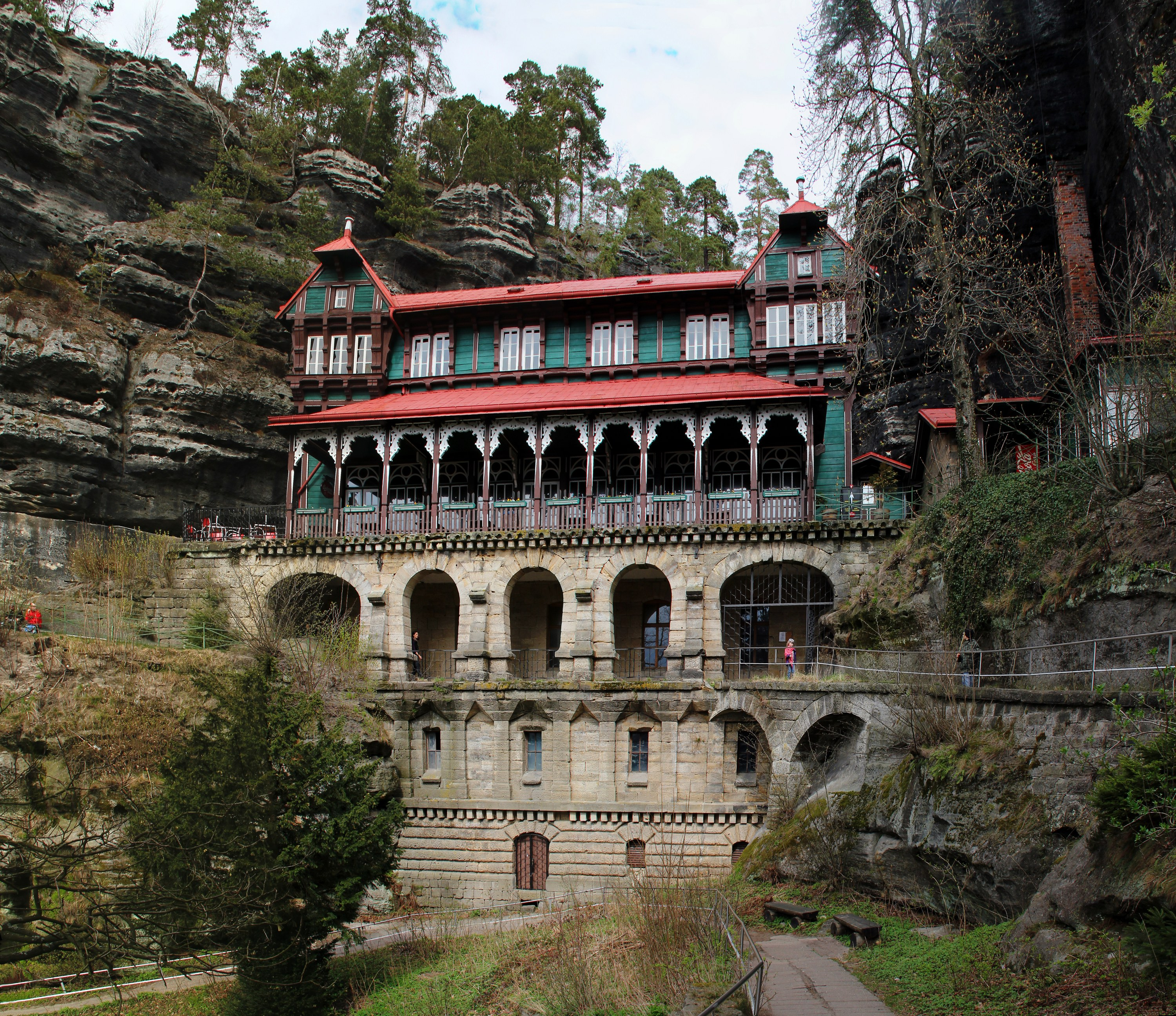
Sokolí hnízdo Hotel next to the arch

The Pravčická brána (in English also Pravčice Gate, Pravčická Gate or Pravcicka Gate; German: Prebischtor) is a narrow rock formation in Bohemian Switzerland in the Czech Republic, approx. 3 km northeast of Hřensko. With a span of 26.5 metres, an inside height of 16 metres, 8 metre maximum width and 3 metre arch, it is the largest natural sandstone arch in Europe, and one of the most striking nature monuments in the Elbe Sandstone Mountains. It is protected as a national nature monument.

== History ==
In 1826, an inn was built by the Pravčická brána. In 1881, Prince Edmund of Clary-Aldringen had built the Hotel Sokolí hnízdo (that time called Falkennest, both meaning "falcon's nest") with 50 beds.

As a result of heavy erosion by visitors, the arch has been placed out of bounds since 1982. The entire terrain has been in private ownership since the privatisation of the hotel and may be visited for an entry fee during opening times.

The Eisenach to Budapest mountain path runs by the Pravčická brána.

== Film ==
Several landscape scenes in the film The Chronicles of Narnia: The Lion, the Witch and the Wardrobe were filmed here. Because the rock formation may no longer be climbed on, the scenes in which the actors appear to run over the arch were taken in the studio and pasted in.

== See also ==
- Malá Pravčická brána
