= List of defunct airlines of Georgia =

This is a list of defunct airlines of the European country of Georgia.

Airline	Image	IATA	ICAO	Callsign	Commenced operations	Ceased operations	Notes
Adjarian Airlines			ADJ		1994	2001	
AG Air			AGA		2013		
Air Batumi			BTM	AIR BATUMI	2010	2014	
Air Bisec					1998	2004	Rebranded as Georgian National Airlines
Air Caucasus		UY	CSG		2012	2014	
Air Georgia		DF	AGF	AIR GEORGIA	1992	1999	Merged with Airzena to form Airzena Georgian Airlines
Air Iberia			TBB		2009	2011	
Air Victory Georgia			GVI		2004	2009	
Air West			AWG		2008	2010	
Airzena		A9	TGZ		1994	1999	Merged with Air Georgia to form Airzena Georgian Airlines
Airzena Georgian Airlines					1999	2004	Rebranded as Georgian Airways
Aquilene International							
Aviaexport Airways					2013		
Avial Airlines			GGO		2003	2003	
Caucasus Airlines		NS	SRJ	CAUCASUS	2002	2004	
Eastern Express Georgia			DGD		2009	2010	
Eurex Airlines			URX		2009	2011	
EuroLine		4L	MJX		2004	2010	Rebranded as Georgian International Airlines
Fly Georgia		9Y	FGE	GEORGIAN WING	2011	2013	
Flyvista		GT	AJD	Vista Georgia	2014	2015	Division of Vista Georgia
Georgian Airlines					1998	1999	Merged into Airzena Georgian Airlines
Georgian Cargo Airlines		6R	GEG		1998	2002	
Georgian International Airlines		4L	GNN	GEO-LINE	2004	2014	
Georgian National Airlines		QB	GFG		2004	2008	Rebranded as Sky Georgia
Georgian Star International			GST	GEORGIAN STAR	2009		
Georgian Wings		D4	GEL	SKY GEORGIA	2017	2025	
Global Georgian Airways			GGZ		2004	2009	
Karre Aviation Georgia			GEO		2010	2011	
Lasare Air			LRE		1995	2004	
Luftline Georgia						2016	
Orbi Georgian Airways		NQ	DVU		1992	1998	Rebranded as Georgian Airlines
Sakaviaservice		EU	AZG		1998	2010	
Sky Georgia		QB	GFG	NATIONAL	2008	2011	
Sun Way			MGC		2010	2011	
TAM Air (Tbilaviamsheni)		L6	VNZ		2001	2010	
Transair Georgia							
VIP-Avia			VPV		2005	2008	
Vista Georgia			AJD		2010		
Zakavia					1923	1929	Merged with Ukhrozdukhput into Dobrolyot

== See also ==
- List of airlines of Georgia (country)
- List of airports in Georgia (country)
