= Georgian Civil Aviation Administration =

Georgian Civil Aviation Administration (Georgian: საქართველოს სამოქალაქო ავიაციის ადმინისტრაციის) is the Aviation Authority which controls all the aviation affairs on the territory of Georgia. GCCA HQ is at Tbilisi International Airport in the city of Tbilisi (Coordinates : 41°40'09N 044°57'17E).

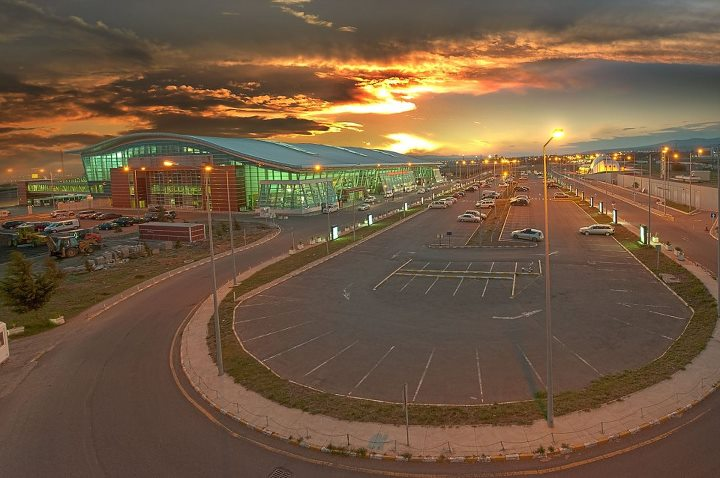
Tbilisi Intl' Airport is controlled and owned by GCCA.

GCAA complies with the ICAO (International Civil Aviation Organization) HQ in Montreal, Quebec, CANADA.

== Air Transportation ==
Air Transportation Functions of Air Transportation Department: Facilitating Georgian air carriers in International aviation market access; Granting Georgian aviation market access to foreign air carriers; Issuing permissions for non-scheduled flights to Georgian and foreign air carriers; Granting of permissions for the aerial works in the territory of Georgia; Approval of airlines flight schedules in accordance with IATA navigation seasons; Certification of air cargo terminals; Surveillance on shipment of dangerous goods by the civil aircraft and lifting up restrictions for carriage of above-mentioned cargo by the same transport.

== Aerodromes and Airports ==
The main responsibilities of Aerodromes and Airports Department: Certification of Civil Aerodromes and Heliports; Keeping State Registers of Civil Aerodromes and Heliports; Performing technical regulation of certified civil aerodromes and heliports, carrying out control over its compliance with International civil aviation standards and continuing surveillance, as well as inspection of their activities, as to ensure flight safety; Keeping records and controlling the obstacles at aerodromes and on its close vicinity, as well as in the aircraft's’ flight and manoeuvring zones; Keeping records over the domestic flying grounds and conducting there technical supervision; Certification of aviation fuel suppliers; Keeping Registers of aviation fuel suppliers; Performing technical supervision and inspection of aviation fuel suppliers.

== Air Navigation Service Department ==
The main responsibilities of ANS Department: Conducting certification and supervision of Air Navigation Service Providers; Approving and monitoring of technical facilities and devices, relevant for the providing Air Traffic Management (ATM), Communication, navigation and surveillance (CNS) services as well as Aeronautical Information Service (AIS); Carrying out the surveillance on Aeronautical Meteorological Service maintenance; Organizing search and rescue activities in the Civil Aviation field and ensuring coordination with appropriate government authorities.

This is a list of airlines currently operating in Georgia under Georgian Civil Aviation Administration (GCCA).

AIRLINE	IATA	ICAO	Call sign	COMMENCED OPERATIONS	NOTES
Air Batumi	-	BTM	AIR BATUMI	2010	
LLC Airline Geo Sky	D4	GEL	SKY GEORGIA	2017	
Fly Georgia	9Y	FGE	Georgian wing	2010	
Georgian Airways	A9	TGZ	TAMAZI	2004	
Georgian International Airlines	4L	GNN	GEO-LINE	2004	
Sky Georgia	QB	GFG	NATIONAL	2003	
TAM Air	L6	VNZ	TABILAVIA	2001	
