= List of defunct airlines of Armenia =

This is a list of defunct airlines of Armenia.

Airline	Image	IATA	ICAO	Callsign	Commenced operations	Ceased operations	Notes
Adigey Avia			DYA		2003	2003	
Air Armenia		QN	ARR	AIR ARMENIA	2003	2014	
Air Dilijans		RM	NGT	NIKA	2016	2025	Trading name of Aircompany Armenia since March 2023
Air Highnesses			HNS		2008	2014	
Air Van Airlines			VAR	VAR	2003	2005	
Air Wings			LXL	LUXLINER	1998	1998	
AirGloria					2007	2007	
Ararat Avia		4A	ARK		1991	1999	Operated Antonov An-12, Yak-40 Merged into Armenian Airlines in 1999
Ararat International Airlines		4A	RRN	ARARAT AVIA	2010	2013	
Arax Airways		Y5	RXR		1995	1999	Operated Tupolev Tu-154
Ark Airways		ZQ	ARQ	ARK AIRWAYS	2010	2013	
Armavia		U8	RNV	ARMAVIA	1997	2013	Went bankrupt
Armenian Airlines (1991)		R3	RME	ARMENIAN	1991	2003	Went bankrupt
Armenian International Airways		MV	RML	ARMENIA	2003	2006	Merged operations into Armavia in 2005
Atlantis Armenian Airlines		TD	LUR	ATLANTIS	2004	2021	
Avia-Urartu			URT	URARTU AIR	2004	2006	Operated Antonov An-12, Antonov An-24
Ayk Avia			AYK		2007 (schedules)		
Blue Sky Airlines (Blue Airways)			BLM	BLUE ARMENIA	2005	2008	
Dvin-Avia			DVN	DIVN-AIR	1996	2002	Operated Ilyushin Il-76
Easyfreight					2010	2010	
Fly Arna (Armenian National Airlines)		G6	ACY	ARNA	2022	2024	
Fly Armenia Airways		VF	FBB		2021	2021	Renamed Hayways in 2021
Golis Airlines					1999	1999	
Gyumri Airlines			GYM	GYUMURI	2003	2004	Operates Tupolev Tu-134
Jupiter-Avia			JPT	JUPITER	1998	2002	
Krunk Air					2013	2013	
LSV					1992	1993	
Mars Avia			MRS	MARS CARGO	2017	2020	Operated Antonov An-26, Antonov An-74
Miapet Avia			MPT	MIAPET	2006	2012	Cargo carrier. Operated Antonov An-12
Navigator Airlines			NVL	NAVLINES	2005	2012	Cargo carrier
Ridge Airways			RDG		2011	2012	
Simeron Enterprises			SPT	SIM-ENTERPRISES	2001	2006	
South Airlines			STH		2001	2018	Operated An-12, An-24, An-28, An-72, Boeing 747, Il-76, Tu-154
Taron Avia		H7	TRV	TARON AVIA	2017	2019	
Tiga-Air			CKW		2001	2005	
V Bird Avia			VBD	VEEBIRD-AVIA	2010	2011	Operated Il-76
Vertir Airlines			VRZ	VERTIR	2010	2016	
Veteran Avia			VTF	VETFLIGHT	2009	2014	
Yerevan-Avia			ERV	YEREVAN-AVIA	1992	2006	

== See also ==
- List of airlines of Armenia
- List of airports in Armenia
- List of defunct airlines of Europe
- Transport in Armenia
