= List of airlines of Georgia =

This is a list of airlines currently operating in Georgia.

== Scheduled airlines ==
Airline	Image	IATA	ICAO	Callsign	Commenced operations	Notes
Georgian Airways		A9	TGZ	TAMAZI	2004	Rebranded from Airzena (1994-2004); Flag carrier of Georgia

== Commuter airlines ==
Airline	Image	IATA	ICAO	Callsign	Commenced operations	Notes
Tbilisi Airways					2022 (planned)	
Vanilla Sky Airlines					2008	

== Cargo airlines ==
Airline	Image	IATA	ICAO	Callsign	Commenced operations	Notes
Camex		Z7	CMS	CAMEX	2018	
Easy Charter		RD	LOL	EASY CHARTER	2020	
Geosky		D4	GEL	SKY GEORGIA	2017	
Georgian Airlines		GH	IGT	SKY IKA	2022	
MyWay Airlines		MJ	MYW	MY SKY	2018	

== Charter airlines ==
Airline	Image	IATA	ICAO	Callsign	Commenced operations	Notes
TCA		N6	TZS	TOKA	2012	

== See also ==
- List of defunct airlines of Georgia
- List of airlines
- List of defunct airlines of Europe
