= Silk Road (disambiguation) =

The Silk Road is a number of trade routes across the Eurasian landmass.

Silk Road may also refer to:

== Art and media ==
=== Films and television ===
- The Silk Road (Japanese TV series), a 1980 documentary produced by Japan's NHK
- The Silk Road (1988 film), a 1988 Japanese film
- The Maritime Silk Road (film), a 2011 Iranian movie
- The Silk Road (British TV series), a 2016 documentary by the BBC, in three episodes, presented by Sam Willis
- Silk Road (2021 film), about the online marketplace of the same name

=== Games ===
- Silkroad Online, a 2005 free multiplayer online game

=== Literature ===
- Silk Road, a 1989 novel by Jeanne Larsen
- Silk Road, a 2011 book by Colin Falconer (writer)
- Silk Road, a 2014 book by Eileen Ormsby of All Things Vice
- The Silk Roads, 2015 book by Peter Frankopan
- The Silk Road: Trade, Travel, War and Faith, 2004 book by Susan Whitfield
- Silk Roads. Peoples, Cultures, Landscapes., 2019 book by Susan Whitfield

=== Music ===
- Silk Road (album), a 1997 album by Art Farmer
- Silk Road, for string quartet Tan Dun
- Silk Road Fantasia, Zhao Jiping
- Silk Road, album by Kitarō
- Silk Road Suite, a 1996 musical compositions by Kitarō for the NHK documentary series
- "Silk Road", song by Rick Ross from Black Market (Rick Ross album)

=== Theater ===
- Silk Road Rising, a theater company in downtown Chicago

== Companies and organizations ==
- Silk Road (marketplace), anonymous online black market (Tor hidden service) best known for the illegal drug trade, active from 2011 to 2013
- Silkroad (arts organization), a non-profit organization initiated by cellist Yo-Yo Ma

== See also ==
- Belt and Road Initiative
- Maritime Silk Road (disambiguation)
- New Silk Road (disambiguation)
- Silk Route (disambiguation)
- Silk Way (disambiguation)
