= 1992 Tbilisi Tupolev Tu-154 crash =

Fatal aviation accident in Georgia

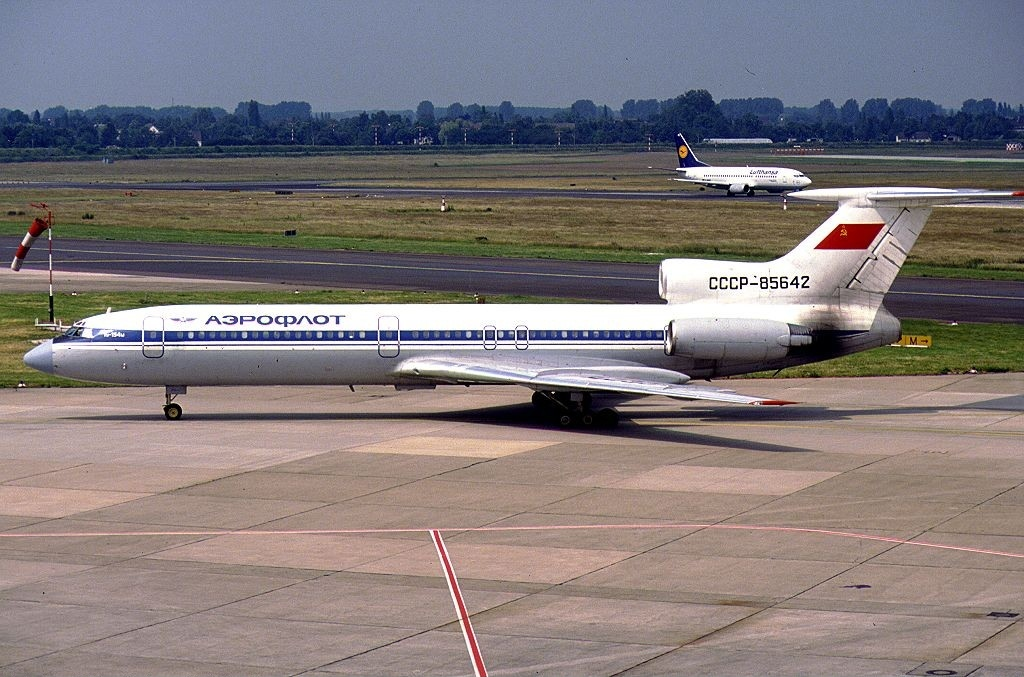
- A Tupolev Tu-154B, similar to the aircraft involved

Accident
- Date: 20 July 1992
- Summary: Crashed during takeoff
- Site: Tbilisi-Novo Alexeyevka Airport, Tbilisi, Georgia
- Total fatalities: 28
- Total survivors: 0

Aircraft
- Aircraft type: Tupolev Tu-154B
- Operator: Transair Georgia or Tbilisi Aviation Enterprise
- Registration: 85222
- Flight origin: Tbilisi-Novo Alexeyevka Airport, Tbilisi, Georgia
- Destination: Mineralnye Vody Airport, Russia
- Occupants: 24
- Passengers: 16
- Crew: 8
- Fatalities: 24
- Survivors: 0

Ground casualties
- Ground fatalities: 4

On 20 July 1992, a Tupolev Tu-154B cargo plane crashed during takeoff from Tbilisi-Novo Alexeyevka Airport in Georgia. The aircraft failed to become airborne and struck a residential area, killing all 24 on board and four more people on the ground. An investigation revealed that the aircraft's cargo was improperly loaded and partially undocumented, causing it to become overloaded.

== Aircraft ==
The Tupolev Tu-154B aircraft was manufactured in 1977 with tail number CCCP-85222 for Aeroflot's International division. It was powered by three Kuznetsov NK-8-2U turbofan engines. On 16 October 1979 it was transferred to Aeroflot's Georgian division. During the 1980 Summer Olympics, it bore the Official Olympic Carrier livery.

== Flight ==
The cargo flight operated either by Transair Georgia or Tbilisi Aviation Enterprise was scheduled from Tbilisi in Georgia to Russia's Mineralnye Vody, carrying tea. The aircraft was carrying eight crew and sixteen passengers; none of the passengers had tickets and did not receive official permission to be on the flight.

The aircraft began its takeoff procedure on runway 31L. While the nose gear lifted off the runway at V1 speed, the main landing gears failed to become airborne. The nose only reached an angle of 6–7°. It rolled past the runway and continued for about 490 m (1,610 ft) before barrelling into a localizer. The impact caused the aircraft to roll over. After traveling for another 190 m (620 ft), it impacted homes in the village of Alekseevka and caught fire. Everyone on board died, along with four people on the ground, although Georgian media said there were as many as 30 ground fatalities. Ten people on the ground were also injured.

== Investigation ==
Officials began suspecting the crash was due to overloading as the aircraft failed to lift off the ground. The investigation revealed that the flight crew and ground personnel at the cargo warehouse had violated regulations for loading cargo. Twenty tons of cargo was present on board, exceeding the maximum allowed weight. The loading of cargo was also improperly done and not all the cargo was recorded; flight documents only recorded 6.4 tons. The cargo placement also violated the Tu-154B's alignment standards. Three tons of load was added without the crew's knowledge, overloading the aircraft by two tons. This altered the aircraft's center of gravity.

The airport transport management and cargo warehouse was a single corporation before separating into two different entities; the airport management did not oversee cargo flights although this arrangement was not officially removed. The airport loading and balance controllers ceased operations for cargo flights while the warehouse company (Lasare) did not provide such services as they did not have relevant employees. As a result, the loading of cargo went unmonitored.
