= Global Georgian Airways =

Georgian airline

Global Georgian Airways (ICAO: GGZ) was an international cargo carrier airline founded in 2004 and was based in Tbilisi International Airport. It ceased operations in 2009.

== See also ==
- List of defunct airlines of Georgia
