= Taron Avia =

Armenian airline

Taron-Avia

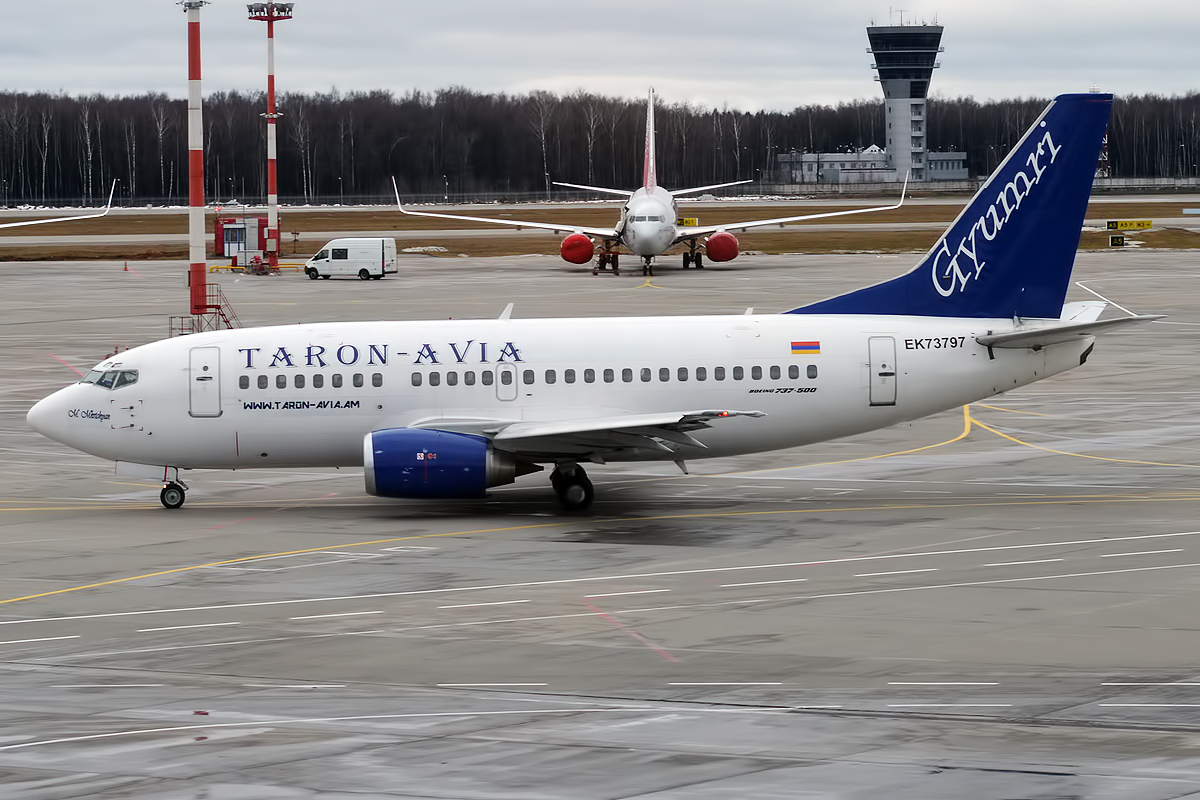
- Boeing 737-500 in 2017
IATA	ICAO	Call sign
H7	TRV	TARON AVIA
- Founded: 2007
- Commenced operations: 2017
- Ceased operations: 2019
- Hubs: Shirak International Airport
- Focus cities: Zvartnots International Airport
- Fleet size: 3
- Destinations: 5
- Headquarters: Yerevan, Armenia
- Website: taron-avia.am

Taron-Avia was an Armenian airline headquartered in Yerevan that operated from 2017 until 2019.

== History ==
Taron-Avia was founded in 2007 and started unscheduled operations on that same year. Originally operating a fleet of four Boeing 737-500s, Taron-Avia operated regular and charter flights from Shirak International Airport and Zvartnots International Airport.

Schedules were launched in April 2017 but they ceased in 2018. They later resumed. As of June 2019, Taron Avia focused its efforts on the transfer of Georgian citizens to and from Russia via Armenia, following Russian President Vladimir Putin's order on suspending Russian flights to Georgia.

In November 2019, the Armenian aviation regulator revoked the airlines' operational license forcing it to suspend all operations.

== Fleet ==
As of August 2019 Taron Avia fleet consisted of three Boeing 737-500s.

== See also ==
- Armenia Aircompany
- Atlantis Armenian Airlines
- Transport in Armenia
