= 1993 Sukhumi airliner attacks =

Part of the War in Abkhazia

- Part of War in Abkhazia (1992–1993)
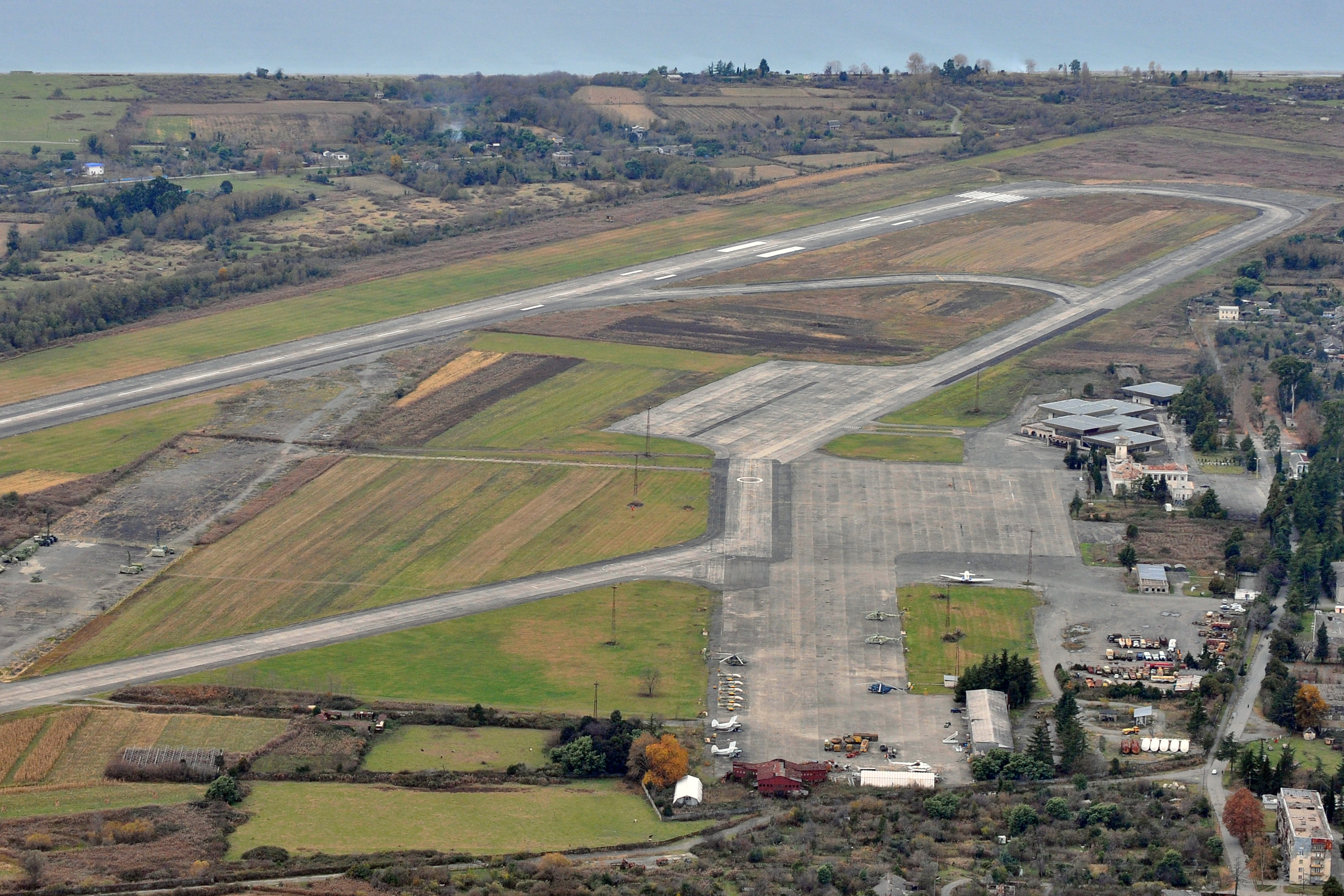
- Overview of Sukhumi Airport
- Location: 42°51′29″N 041°07′41″E; Sukhumi Babushara Airport, Georgia
- Date: 20–23 September 1993

1993 Sukhumi airliner attacks
Occurrence
- Date: 20–23 September 1993
- Summary: Shoot down, destroyed on the ground
- Site: Georgia, Black Sea
- Total fatalities: 136
- Total survivors: 53

First aircraft
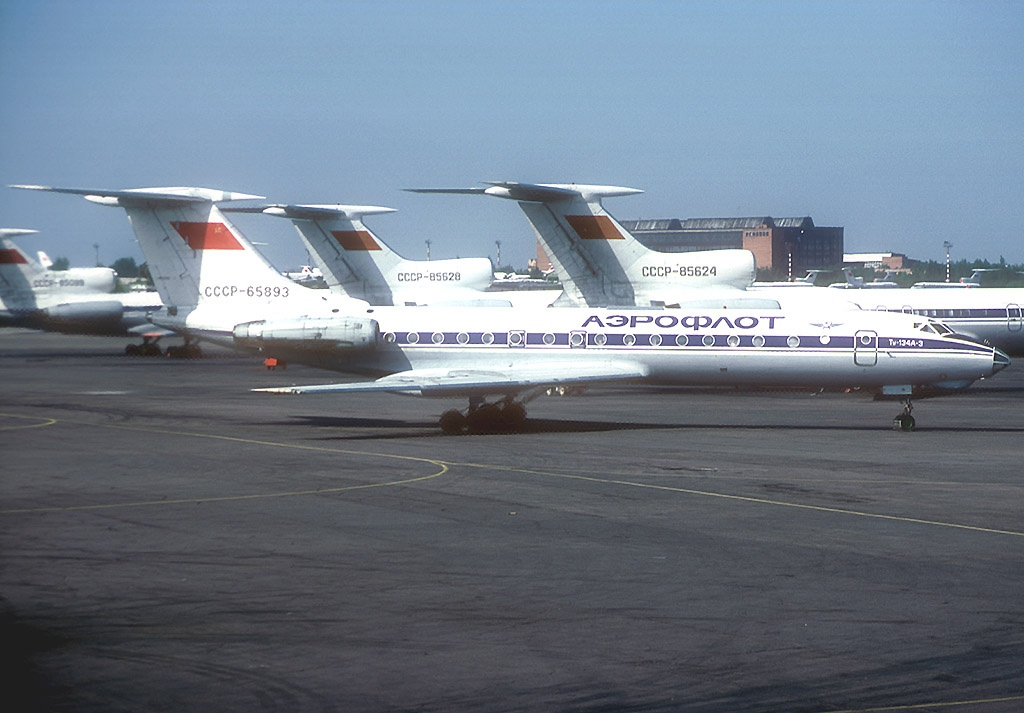
- CCCP-65893, the Tupolev Tu-134A-3 involved in the accident, while still in service with Aeroflot
- Type: Tupolev Tu-134A-3
- Operator: Transair Georgia
- Registration: CCCP-65893
- Flight origin: Sochi Airport
- Destination: Sukhumi-Babusheri Airport
- Occupants: 27
- Passengers: 22
- Crew: 5
- Fatalities: 27
- Survivors: 0

Second aircraft
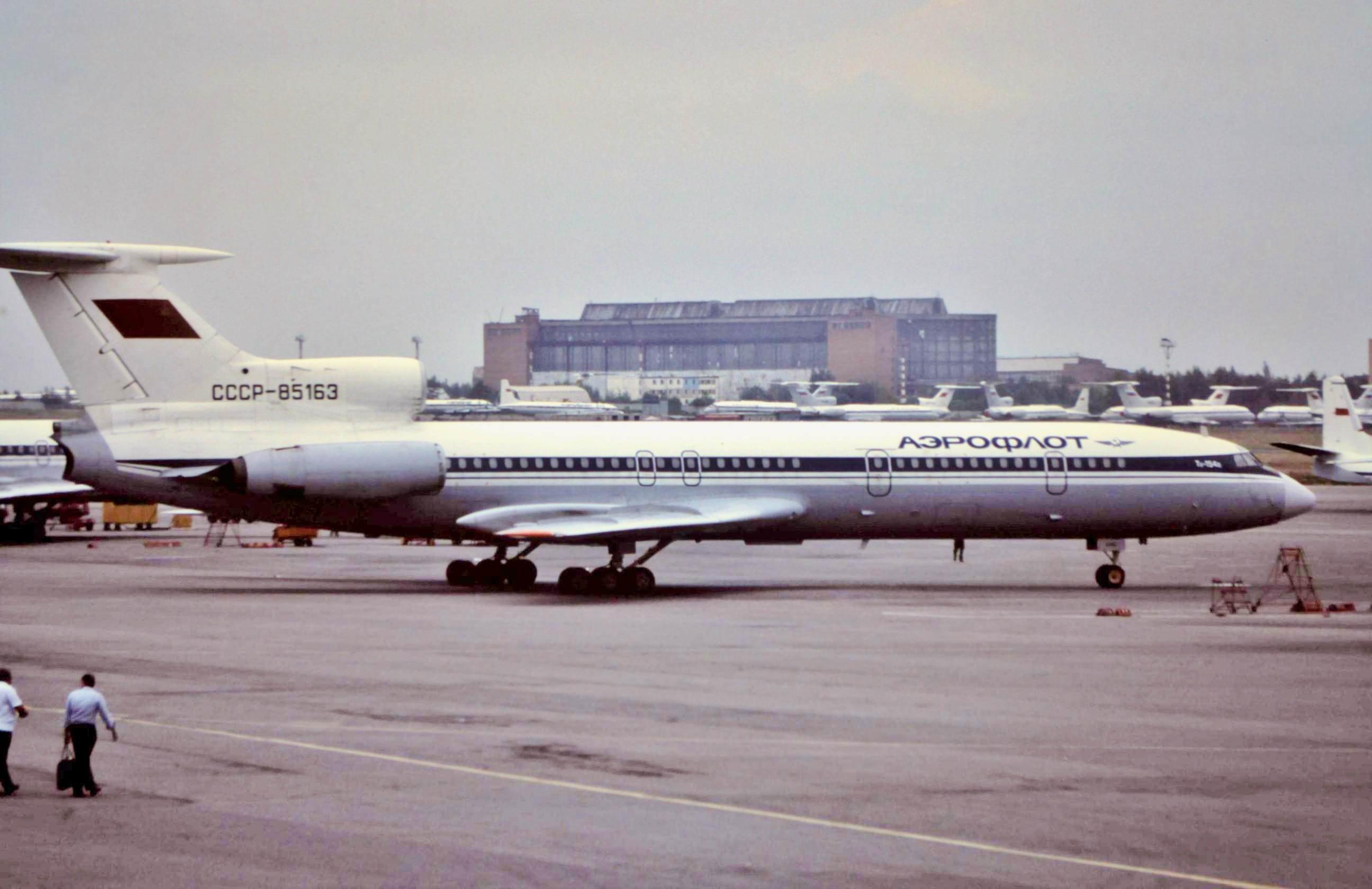
- CCCP-85163, the Tupolev Tu-154B involved in the accident, while still in service with Aeroflot
- Type: Tupolev Tu-154B
- Operator: Orbi Georgian Airways
- Registration: CCCP-85163
- Flight origin: Novo Alexeyevka Airport
- Destination: Sukhumi-Babusheri Airport
- Occupants: 132
- Passengers: 120
- Crew: 12
- Fatalities: 108
- Survivors: 24

Third aircraft
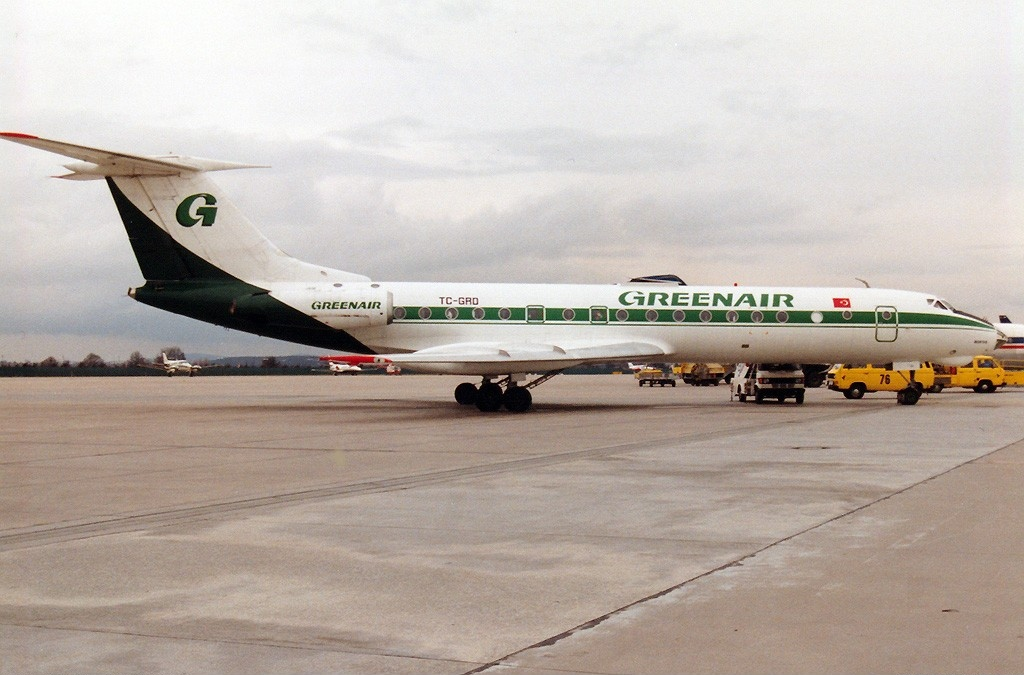
- A Tupolev Tu-134A similar to the accident aircraft
- Type: Tupolev Tu-134A
- Operator: Transair Georgia
- Registration: CCCP-65001
- Flight origin: Sukhumi-Babusheri Airport
- Destination: Novo Alexeyevka Airport
- Occupants: 30
- Passengers: 24
- Crew: 6
- Fatalities: 1
- Survivors: 29

From 20 to 23 September 1993, during the Sukhumi massacre, separatists in Sukhumi, Abkhazia blocked Georgian troops' overland supply routes as part of the war in Abkhazia. In response, the Georgian government used Sukhumi Babushara Airport to ferry supplies to troops stationed in Sukhumi. Abkhaz forces attacked the airport in an attempt to further block the supply routes.

During the siege of the airport, five civilian airliners belonging to Transair Georgia and Orbi Georgian Airways were hit by missiles allegedly fired by separatists in Sukhumi. Over 130 people died in the attacks.

== 20 September ==
Two Orbi Georgian Airways' Tupolev Tu-134As (65808 and 65809) were destroyed by Abkhaz small arms fire or missiles with no casualties.

== 21 September ==
A Transair Тu-134А-3 (built in 1975 with registration 65893 and factory number 5340120) was flying to Sukhumi from Sochi International Airport. The crew consisted of captain Geras Georgievich Tabuev, first officer Otar Grigorievich Shengelia, navigator Sergey Alexandrovich Shah, flight engineer Vladimir Vasilievich Nazarko, as well as two flight attendants; Ketevan Shalvovna Kvaratsheliya and Olga Mikhailovna Morgunova. Тhe 22 passengers were mainly journalists. At 16:25, at an altitude of 980 feet (300 m), the aircraft was hit on approach to Sukhumi-Babusheri Airport by a Strela 2 surface-to-air missile. The missile had been fired from an Abkhaz boat commanded by Toriy Achba. The plane crashed into the Black Sea, killing all five crew members and 22 passengers. Other sources reported 28 people on board (six crew members and 22 passengers).

== 22 September ==
An Orbi Georgian Airways Tu-154B aircraft (built in 1976 with registration 85163 and factory number 76А163) flying from Tbilisi and carrying civilians and internal security forces was on approach to Sukhumi-Babusheri Airport when it was struck by a surface-to-air missile, fired from a patrol boat by Abkhaz soldier Bulat Amayev. The plane crash-landed on the airstrip; the ensuing fire killed 108 of the 132 passengers and crew, making the incident the deadliest aviation disaster to occur in Georgia. Georgian media claimed that the flight was carrying refugees, but there was no evidence supporting these claims.

Another Tu-154 was attacked later in the evening, but landed safely.

== 23 September ==
Passengers were boarding a Transair Tu-134A (built in 1975 with registration CCCP-65001 and factory number 42235) at Sukhumi when it was struck by rockets from an Abkhaz BM-21 Grad rocket launcher. It caught fire and burned, leaving one crew member dead. The aircraft was due to operate a Sukhumi-Tbilisi service.

On the same day, an ORBI Tu-154 (registration 85359) was reportedly destroyed by mortar or artillery fire.
