= GFG =

GFG may refer to:

== Companies and organizations ==
- Global Fashion Group, and international group of fashion companies headquartered in Luxembourg
- GFG Alliance, an international group of companies owned by British businessman Sanjeev Gupta
- GFG Style, a car design studio of the Italian automotive designer Giorgetto Giugiaro
- Grupo Financiero Galicia, a financial services holding company based in Buenos Aires, Argentina
- Joint Financial Investigative Unit of Federal Criminal Police Office in Germany

== Other uses ==
- GFG, the ICAO code for Georgian National Airlines
- Greedy-Face-Greedy, a Geographic routing strategy
- Grown Folks Gospel, an album by J. Moss
