= Silk Route (disambiguation) =

The Silk Route, or Silk Road, was a network of Eurasian trade routes.

Silk Route may also refer to:

- Silk Route (band), an Indian music band
- Caucasus Airlines, previously known as Silk Route Airways

== See also ==
- Silk Road (disambiguation)
