= FGE =

FGE may refer to:

- Fly Georgia, a defunct Georgian airline
- Formylglycine-generating enzyme
- Fruit Growers Express, an American refrigerator car line
