= Camex (airline) =

Georgia (country) cargo airline, established in 2020

IATA	ICAO	Call sign
Z7	CMS	CAMEX
- Commenced operations: 23 April 2018; 8 years ago
- Hubs: Tbilisi International Airport
- Subsidiaries: CAMEX Adria Airlines
- Fleet size: 4
- Destinations: Athens, Istanbul, Baku, Milan, Almaty, Urümqi, Guangzhou
- Headquarters: Tbilisi, Georgia (country)
- Website: camex.aero

Camex (IATA code: Z7) is a cargo airline based at Tbilisi, Georgia's Tbilisi International Airport. The airline was established in 2020 by parent company Camex International, a cargo company. Camex uses Boeing 737-800 Converted Freighter aircraft.

== History ==
On May 8, 2022, Camex received their air operator's certificate from the Georgian Civil Aviation Administration.

Camex received its first aircraft, a former Ryanair aircraft that was in Guangzhou, China, on July 7 of that year. The airplane is owned by Nomura, Babcock and Brown, which leases it to the Georgian airline.

The airline was formally launched on August 1, 2022, in an event that was attended by, among many others, United States ambassador to Georgia, Kelly Degnan.

In January 2023, Camex announced that they will set up a subsidiary in Slovenia named Camex Adria Airlines. The company successfully applied for a European operational license in December 2023. The subsidiary operates a single Boeing 737-800BCF freighter.

== Fleet ==
=== Current fleet ===
As of July 2026, Camex operates the following aircraft:

Camex fleet
Aircraft	In service	Orders	Notes
Boeing 737-800BCF	1	—	
Boeing 737-800SF	1	—	
Boeing 767-300ER(BDSF)	2	—	
Total	4	—	

=== Former fleet ===
As of August 2025, Camex operated 1 Boeing 737-800BCF, 1 Boeing 737-800SF and 2 Boeing 767-300ER(BDSF).
