= Flyvista =

IATA	ICAO	Call sign
GT	AJD	Vista Georgia
- Commenced operations: 4 August 2014
- Ceased operations: May 2015
- Hubs: Tbilisi International Airport
- Fleet size: 3
- Destinations: 4
- Headquarters: Tbilisi, Georgia
- Website: flyvista.aero

Flyvista was a Georgian low cost carrier headquartered in Tbilisi with its base at Tbilisi International Airport. The company slogan was For those who travel.

== History ==
Flyvista began operations on 5 August 2014, with their first flight to Tehran-Imam Khomeini. In May 2015, Flyvista ceased all operations due to a decreasing number of passengers. Reasons given were the cancellation of visas on arrival in Tbilisi by the government and the lack of passengers on the important Tbilisi-Kyiv route due to the Russo-Ukrainian war.

== Destinations ==
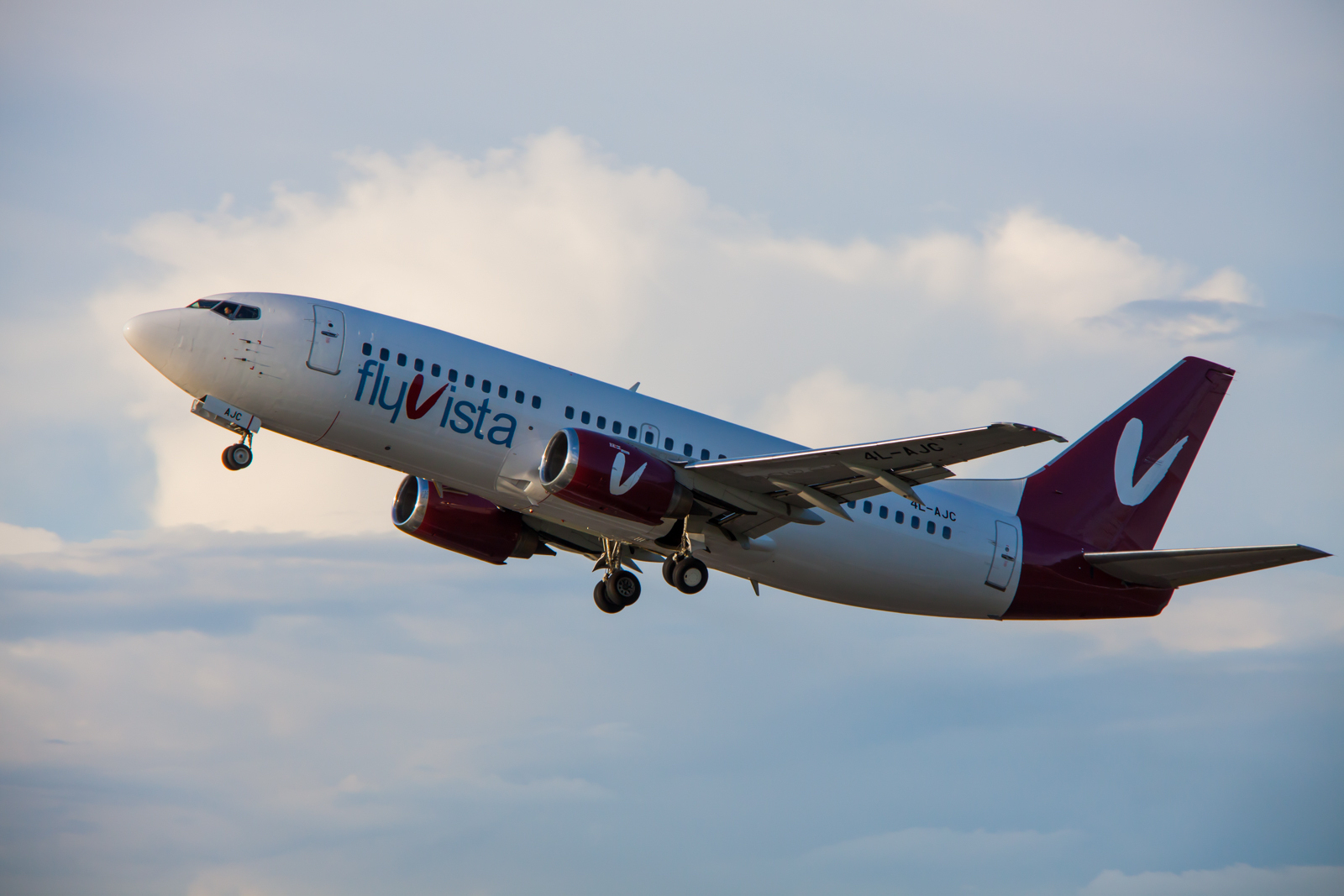
Flyvista Boeing 737-300

As of May 2015, prior to its demise Flyvista served the following destinations:

City	Country	IATA	ICAO	Airport	Ref
Almaty	Kazakhstan	ALA	UAAA	Almaty International Airport	
Kyiv	Ukraine	IEV	UKKK	Kyiv-Zhuliany	
Moscow	Russia	DME	UUDD	Domodedovo International Airport	
Tbilisi	Georgia	TBS	UGTB	Tbilisi International Airport ^{[Base]}	
Tehran	Iran	IKA	OIIE	Imam Khomeini Airport	
