= Sky Georgia =

Georgian airline

Sky Georgia სქაი ჯორჯია
IATA	ICAO	Call sign
QB	GFG	NATIONAL
- Founded: 1998 as Air Bisec
- Ceased operations: 2011
- Operating bases: Tbilisi International Airport
- Fleet size: 1
- Headquarters: Tbilisi, Georgia
- Website: www.skygeorgia.org

Sky Georgia (Georgian: საერთაშორისო ავიაკომპანია „სქაი ჯორჯია“ - saertašoriso aviaqompania «sqai dzhordzhia») was an airline from Tbilisi, Georgia, operating out of Tbilisi International Airport.

== History ==
The airline was established in 1998 as Air Bisec. In 2004, it was renamed Georgian National Airlines. The current Sky Georgia brand was adopted in 2008, when the company was acquired by US-based Sky Investment Group. In October 2009, the airline ceased all scheduled flights and stated that it would concentrate on cargo rather than on passenger transport. In January 2010, three Ilyushin Il-76 freighter aircraft were leased.

Georgy Kodua was the general director and CEO of Sky Georgia. (Note: In 2006, Georgy Kodua (Russian: Георгий Кодуа) (Georgian: გიორგი კოდუა) who was the president of Georgian National Airlines during the 2006 Georgian–Russian espionage controversy, demanded that Russia compensate Georgian National Airlines for its lost revenue due to Russia closing its airspace to Georgian air carriers. At that time, his brother Irakli Kodua (Russian: Ираклий (Эрекле) Кодуа) (Georgian: ირაკლი (ერეკლე) კოდუა) was the head of the Georgian Internal Affairs Ministry's special department (Russian: спецдепартамента МВД Грузии). Georgy Kodua is the founder and president of Air Georgia. Georgy Kodua was the founder and president of Air Caucasus. In February 2016, Georgy Kodua's older brother David Kodua (Russian: Давид Кодуа) (Georgian: დავით კოდუა), a businessman who owns the Commerce Group (Georgian: კომერციული ჯგუფი), was trying to develop the Casino Georgia Hotel into a Hilton Hotel. David Kodua was a former business partner of Noshrevan Namoradze (Georgian: ნოშრევან ნამორაძე) who was responsible for the violent 3 May 2014 attack on Davit Kodua.)

In 2007, the airline (which was called Georgian National Airlines at that time) had a codeshare agreement with airBaltic on the latter's route from Riga to Tbilisi. In summer 2008, scheduled and charter services were operated from Tbilisi, Kutaisi and Batumi to destinations in Europe and Central Asia. On 9 August 2008, following the outbreak of the 2008 South Ossetia war, Georgian National Airlines was banned from operating into Russia. After the crisis, flights were not resumed.

== Destinations ==
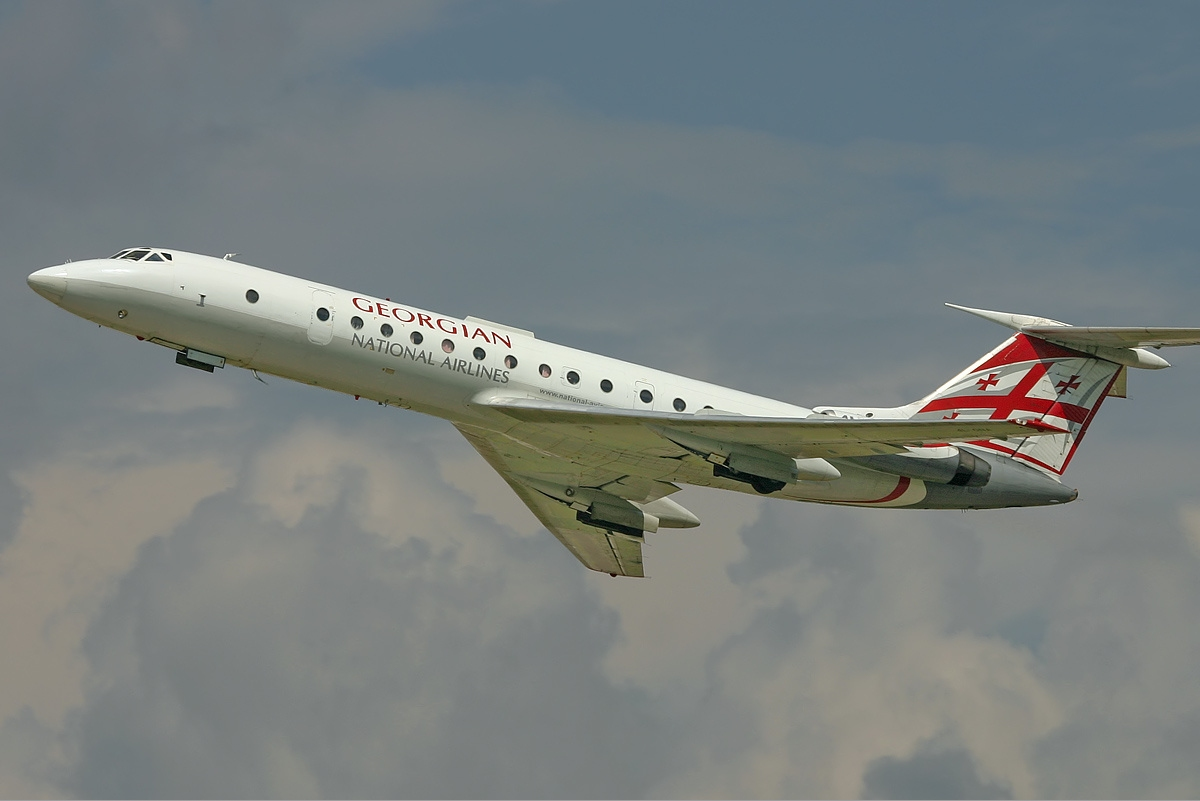
A Tupolev Tu-134 of Georgian National Airlines in 2006, shortly after take-off at Vnukovo International Airport.

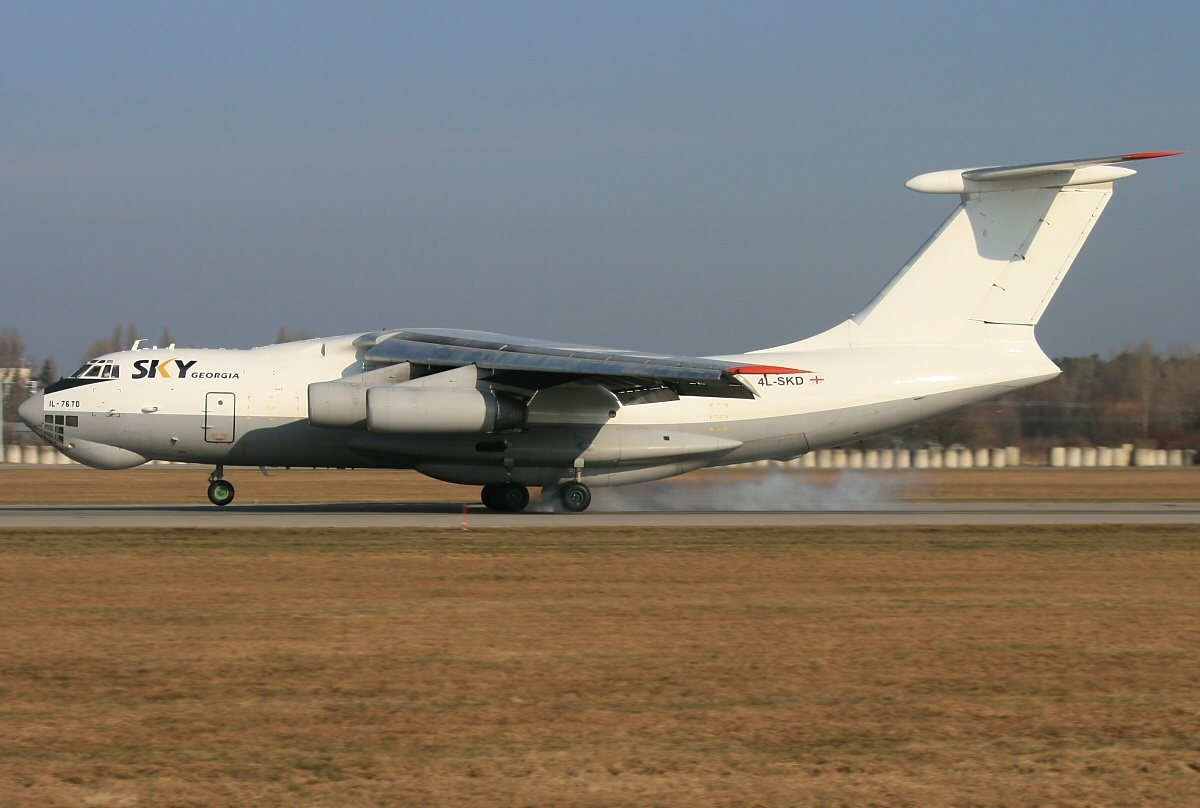
A Sky Georgia Ilyushin Il-76 at Pardubice Airport in 2011.

As of January 2011, the official Sky Georgia timetable does not list any scheduled flights.

=== Former destinations ===
Sky Georgia used to serve the following scheduled destinations:

Asia

- Georgia
  - Batumi - Batumi International Airport
  - Tbilisi - Tbilisi International Airport

Europe

- Belarus
  - Minsk - Minsk International Airport
- Turkey
  - Antalya - Antalya Airport
- Ukraine
  - Kyiv - Boryspil International Airport

== Fleet ==
=== Historic fleet ===
Over the years, the airline operated the following aircraft types:

- Tupolev Tu-134B (until 2007)
- Bombardier CRJ200 (2007–2008)
- Ilyushin Il-76T (from 2010)
- McDonnell Douglas DC-9-50
