= Air Batumi =

IATA	ICAO	Call sign
-	BTM	AIR BATUMI (1)
- Founded: 2010
- Ceased operations: 2012
- Hubs: Batumi International Airport
- Fleet size: 2
- Destinations: 3
- Headquarters: Batumi, Georgia
- Website: www.airbatumi.net

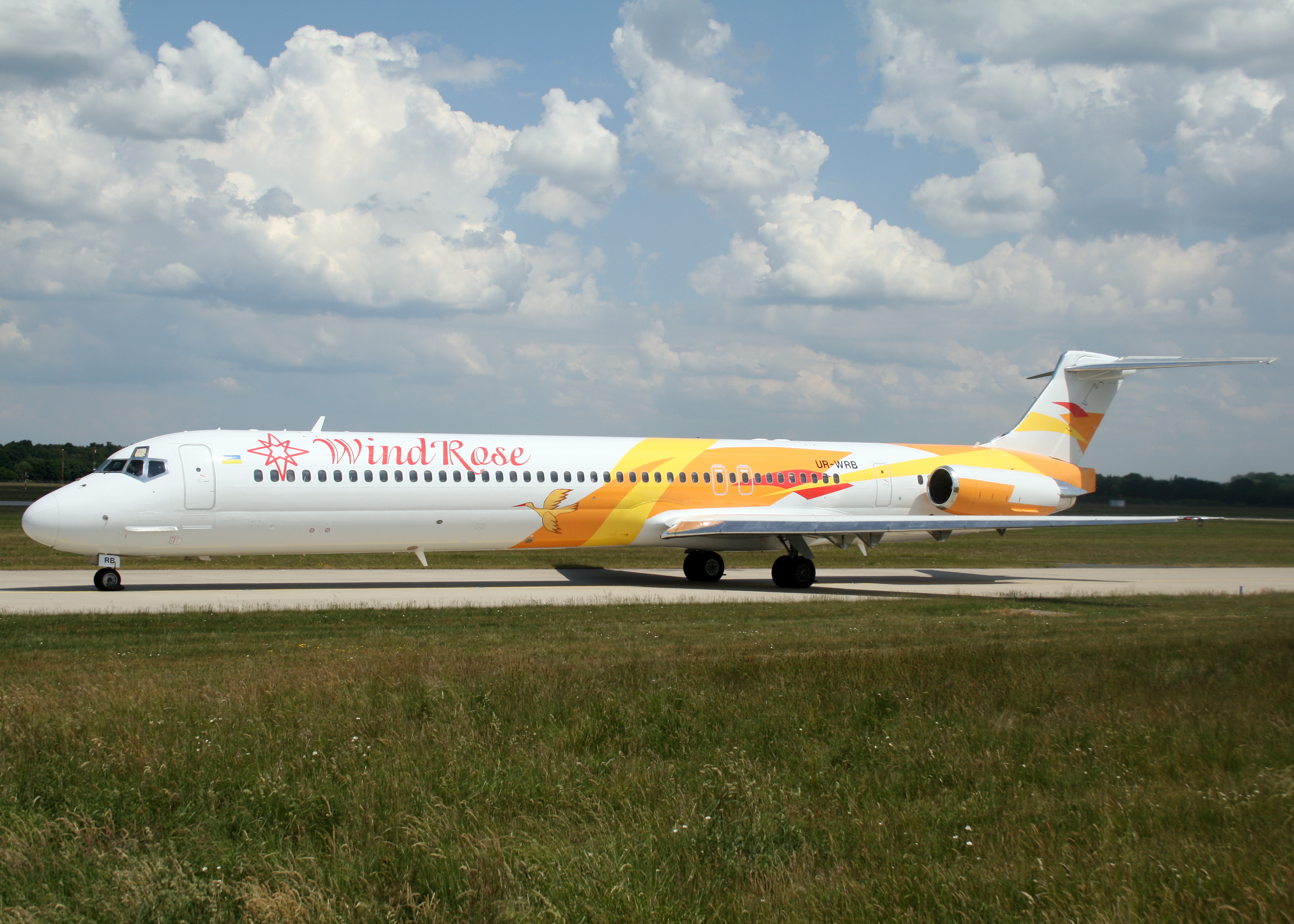

Air Batumi was an airline based in Batumi, Georgia with its base at Batumi International Airport.

== Destinations ==
Air Batumi used to serve the following destinations:

- Georgia
  - Batumi - Batumi International Airport
  - Tbilisi - Tbilisi International Airport
- Iran
  - Tehran - Imam Khomeini International Airport

== Fleet ==
The Air Batumi fleet included the following aircraft (as of 14 August 2010):

Air Batumi fleet
Aircraft	Total	Orders	Notes
Boeing 737-300	1	—	operated for Ariana Afghan Airlines
Saab 340A	1	—	operated by Direct Aero Services
Total	2	—	
