= Air Georgia =

Cargo airline in Georgia

IATA	ICAO	Call sign
DA	AGF	AIR GEORGIA
- Founded: 2015 (11 years ago)
- Commenced operations: 30 August 2016 (10 years ago)
- Hubs: Tbilisi International Airport
- Fleet size: 1
- Headquarters: Tbilisi

Air Georgia is a cargo airline from Georgia. It was founded in 2015 and commenced operations in August 2016 after receiving its first aircraft. The airline has its main hub at Tbilisi International Airport, and its fleet comprises one Boeing 747 aircraft.

== History ==
Georgy Kodua (Russian: Георгий Кодуа) (Georgian: გიორგი კოდუა) is the founder and president of Air Georgia which was financed by Arab investors.

== Fleet ==
As of August 2020 the Air Georgia fleet consists of the following aircraft:

Air Georgia fleet
Aircraft	In fleet	Orders	Historic	Capacity	Notes
Boeing 747-200BSF	1		1	Cargo	
Total	1		1		

== See also ==
- List of airlines of Georgia (country)
