= Maritime Silk Road (disambiguation) =

The Maritime Silk Road is the maritime portion of the historic Silk Road.

Maritime Silk Road may also refer to:

- 21st Century Maritime Silk Road, a Chinese foreign policy initiative
- The Maritime Silk Road (film), a 2011 Iranian movie

== See also ==
- Silk Road (disambiguation)
- Maritime Silk Route Museum, Guangdong Province, China
