= Atlantis Armenian Airlines =

Armenian airline

Atlantis Armenian Airlines Ատլանտիս Հայկական Ավիաուղիներ

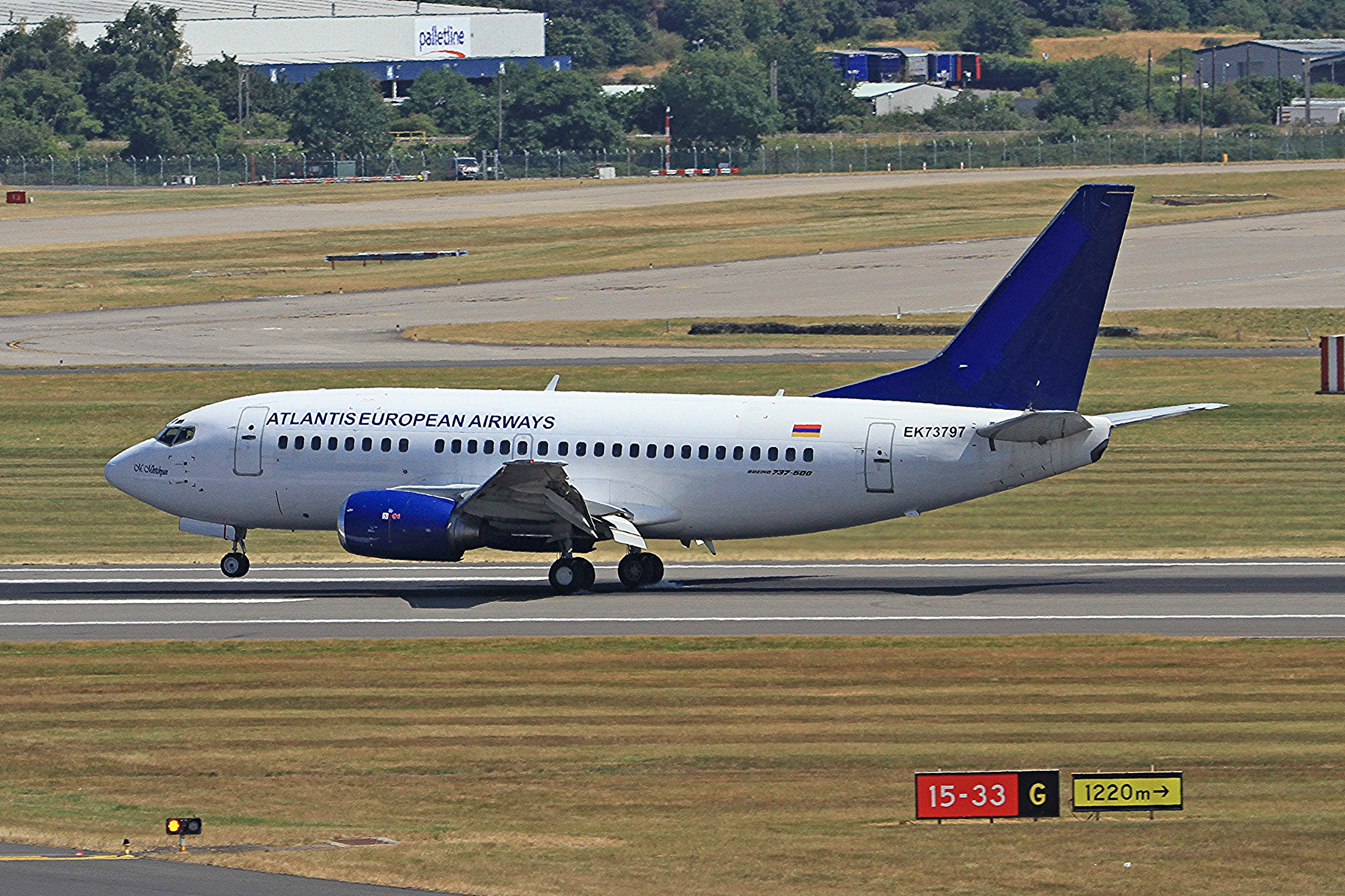
- Boeing 737-500
IATA	ICAO	Call sign
TD	LUR	ATLANTIS
- Founded: 2004
- Ceased operations: 2021
- AOC #: 068
- Operating bases: Zvartnots International Airport
- Fleet size: 4
- Headquarters: Yerevan, Armenia
- Website: atlantis.am

Atlantis Armenian Airlines LLC, commonly known as Atlantis European Airways, was an airline of Armenia. Founded in 2004. The airline ceased operations on 20 February 2021.

== Operations ==
Initially, the airline operated flights exclusively to Vienna, where it connected to the Austrian Airlines network. The fleet consisted of a single Boeing 737-500.

As of 2014, it had no owned aircraft and only offered codeshare flights in cooperation with Austrian Airlines and Czech Airlines. After some time they started to build up their own fleet with a sole pre-owned Airbus A320-200 with the aim to reach leisure destinations.

According to the company's then business plan, the airline would operate flights from Yerevan to Tbilisi and Kutaisi airports in Georgia, as well as services to other destinations within the region. In 2020 summer season, Atlantis Armenian Airlines planned to operate flights from Yerevan to Vienna, Prague, and Athens, as well as to Kyiv and Moscow using Airbus A320 aircraft. The airline also intended to operate charter flights to various Greek Islands.

In March 2020, the airline organized a special flight from Rome to Yerevan for Armenian citizens wishing to leave Italy due to the COVID-19 pandemic. In August of that same year, the Armenian authorities suspended the airlines licenses and the company subsequently ceased all operations for good on 20 February 2021.

== Fleet ==
The fleet consisted of the following aircraft:

Aircraft	In Service	Orders	Passengers			Notes
Aircraft	In Service	Orders	J	Y	Total	Notes
Airbus A320-200	3	1	—	180	180	
Boeing 737-500	1	—				
Total	4	—				

== See also ==
- Armenia Aircompany
- Transport in Armenia
- List of airports in Armenia
- List of the busiest airports in Armenia
