= TAM Air =

Georgian airline

TAM Air TbilAviaMsheni
IATA	ICAO	Call sign
L6	VNZ	TBILAVIA
- Founded: 2001
- Ceased operations: 2010
- Hubs: Tbilisi International Airport
- Fleet size: 1
- Headquarters: Tbilisi, Georgia
- Website: tamair.ge

TbilAviaMsheni, trading as TAM Air (Georgian: თბილავიამშენი, romanized: tbilaviamsheni), was a Georgian airline based in Tbilisi.

== History ==
Aircraft Investor Resources (AIR) had appointed Georgian manufacturer Tbilaviamsheni (TAM) to manufacture the fuselage, wings and stabilizer for its Epic LT single-engined turboprop kitplane, for which it had 25 orders. Rick Schrameck, AIR owner and chief executive, stated Tbilisi-based TAM will build the same parts for the certificated version of the LT. Las Vegas-based AIR was gearing up for first delivery of the Epic kit by year end.

TAM, which was a joint stock company, was in the process of restructuring its complete organisation consisting primarily of its aircraft manufacturing/maintenance concern and its small regional airline with the objective of acquiring a larger share of the civil aviation market, in Georgia and Euro-Asia. It was also looking into expanding into a multimodal logistics centre as the main merchandise railway line, serving the Black Sea ports of Poti and Batumi, run right on the location of its airfield making it very convenient for rail, road and air freight to converge both to and from Central Europe, northern Africa and Asia.

However, TAM Air ceased operations in 2010.

== Fleet ==
The TAM Air fleet consisted of the following aircraft as of 29 May 2009:

- 1 Boeing 737-200 (operated by Starline.kz)
