= Jupiter-Avia =

Armenian airline

IATA	ICAO	Call sign
-	JPT	JUPITER
- Founded: 1998
- Ceased operations: 2002
- Hubs: Erebuni Airport
- Fleet size: 2
- Headquarters: Armenia

Jupiter-Avia was an airline based at Erebuni Airport in Armenia.

== History ==
Jupiter-Avia was formed in 1998 by Dvin-Avia and operated two Antonov An-24. Operations were halted in 2002.

== Fleet ==
2 x Antonov AN-24
