= New Silk Road =

New Silk Road can refer to:

- Eurasian Land Bridge, rail transport route between Europe and Asia
- Belt and Road Initiative, a Chinese-sponsored Eurasian development strategy
- New Silk Road Initiative, a US initiative for economic integration in Central Asia
- New Silk Road, a 2018 album by Maksim Mrvica

== See also ==
- Silk Road, a network of trade routes connecting the East and West from the 2nd century BCE to the 18th century
