= Sukhum International Airport =

Airport in Sukhumi, Abkhazia, Georgia

Vladislav Ardzinba Sukhum International Airport Международный аэропорт Сухум имени В. Г. Ардзинба

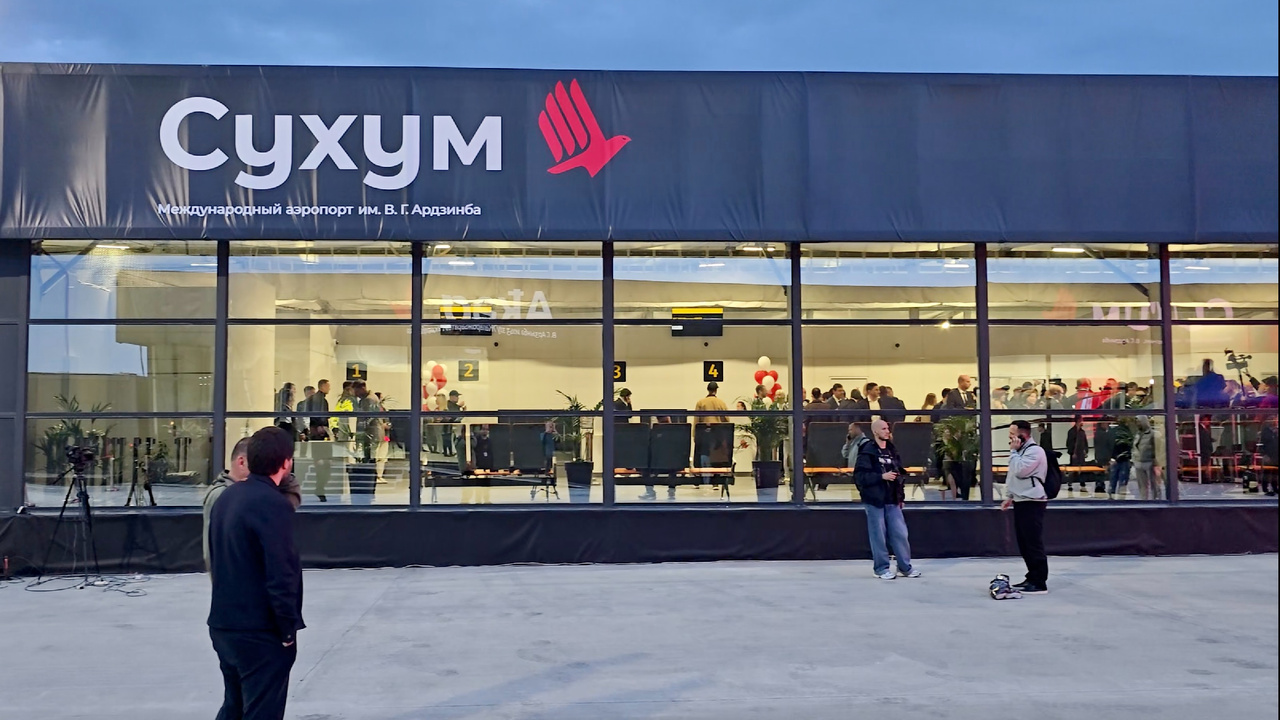
- IATA: SUI; ICAO: UGSS / URAS

Summary
- Airport type: Public / Military
- Serves: Sukhumi
- Location: Abkhazia / Georgia
- Time zone: Moscow Time (UTC+3)
- Elevation AMSL: 65 ft (20 m)
- Coordinates: 42°51′29″N 041°07′41″E
- Website: Official website

Map
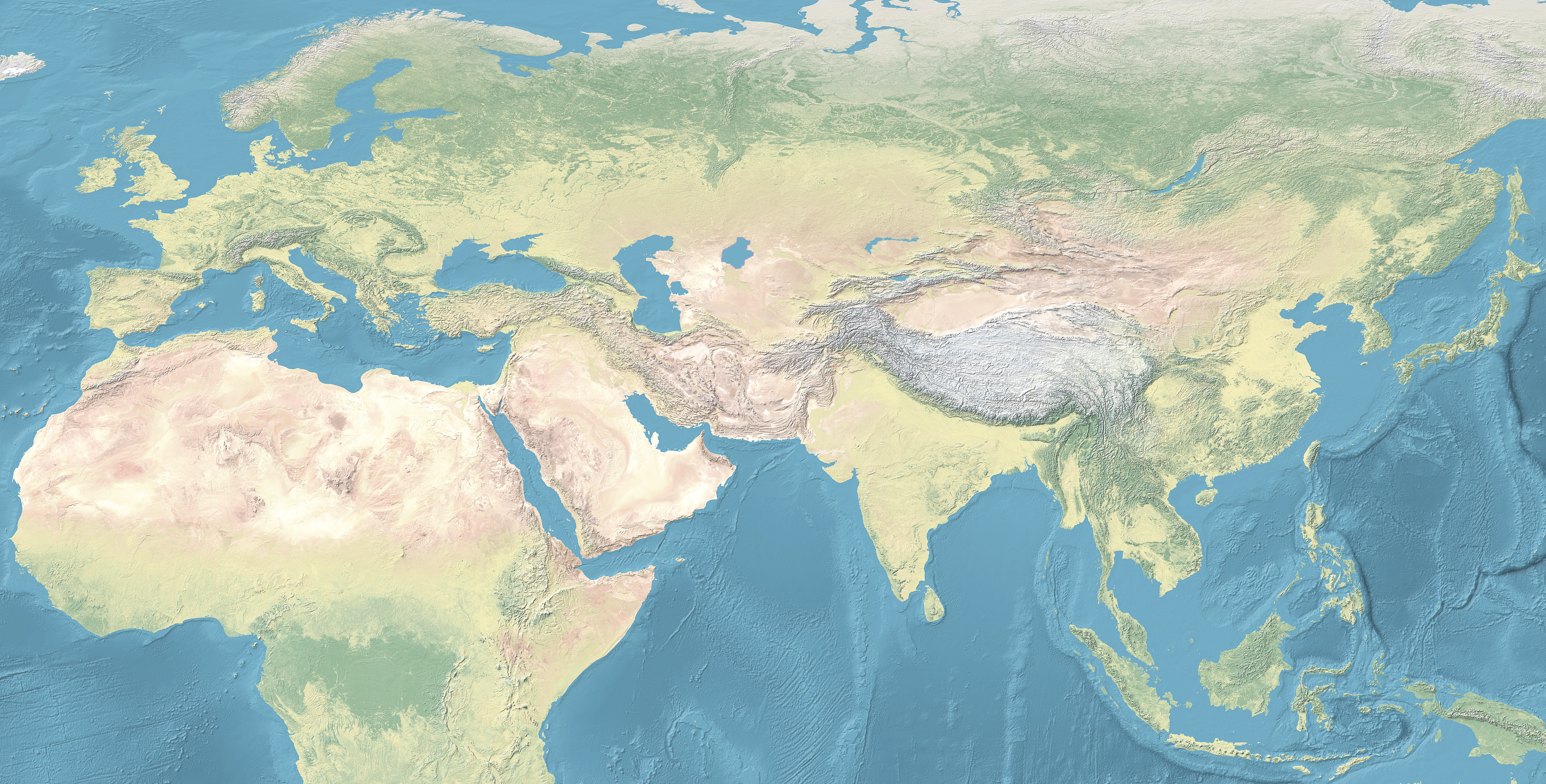
- Location within Abkhazia Location within Georgia Location within Europe Location within West and Central Asia Location within Eurasia

Runways
| Direction | Length | | Surface |
| Direction | m | ft | Surface |
|---|---|---|---|
| 12/30 | 3,145 | 10,301 | Concrete |
- Source: DAFIF

Vladislav Ardzinba Sukhum International Airport (IATA: SUI, ICAO: URAS), formerly known as Sukhumi Babushara and Sukhumi Dranda (IATA: SUI, ICAO: UGSS) is the main airport of Abkhazia. It is located in the village of Babushara next to the larger village of Dranda and some 20 kilometres (12 mi) from Sukhumi, the capital of the unrecognised republic of Abkhazia.

On 1 May 2025, Sukhum airport resumed operations and direct flights with Moscow for the first time since the 1990s and the war in Abkhazia.

== History ==
The airport was built in the mid-1960s, when the region was part of the Soviet Union. In the Soviet era, it was used only for domestic flights, primarily to transport people from across the Soviet Union to the beaches of Abkhazia. The airport was heavily damaged during the civil war in the early 1990s. Land mines and other explosive remnants of war have been cleared from the airport since by the HALO Trust, the only land mine clearance agency active in Abkhazia at the present time.

In 2006, the government of the Republic of Abkhazia expressed its desire to resume international air traffic in the future; however, the facility is not recognized as an international airport by ICAO, and flights can be allowed only with the permission of the Georgian government.

There is another airport in Abkhazia near Gudauta, which serves Russian military troops located there, and an airstrip in Pskhu.

In July 2019, the leadership of Abkhazia issued a decree to open the "Vladislav Ardzinba Sukhum International Airport" for international flights.

In July 2023, the People's Assembly of Abkhazia ratified an agreement that will allow a Russian investor to reconstruct the airport.

On 7 February 2025, UVT Aero operating a test flight from Vnukovo Airport in Moscow and finally landed at the airport. This led to reopening of scheduled flights, with first commercial flight to Moscow.

== Airlines and destinations ==
| Airlines | Destinations |
|---|---|
| Ikar | Seasonal: Moscow-Sheremetyevo |
| Nordwind Airlines | Seasonal: Chelyabinsk, Kazan, Nizhniy Novgorod, Omsk, Samara, Saint Petersburg, Ufa, Yekaterinburg |
| RusLine | Seasonal: Khanty-Mansiysk, Moscow-Vnukovo, Mineralnye Vody, Orenburg, Ufa |
| Ural Airlines | Seasonal: Moscow-Domodedovo, Samara, Yekaterinburg |

== Incidents ==
On 14 August 1982 two airliners collided on a runway at Babushara Airport. The aircraft involved were a Tu-134A (registration number CCCP-65836, factory number 17113, serial number 25-08) and a Let L-410M (registration number CCCP-67191, factory number 781120, serial number 11-20) operated by "Aeroflot" on flights 974 (Sukhumi to Moscow) and G-73 (Sukhumi to Kutaisi). The collision resulted in the deaths of 11 people—all 9 passengers and both pilots on the L-410.

== See also ==
- 1993 Sukhumi airliner attacks
