= MyWay Airlines =

Georgian airline

Myway Airlines
IATA	ICAO	Call sign
MJ	MYW	MY SKY
- Founded: 2017
- Commenced operations: 3 April 2018
- Operating bases: Tbilisi International Airport
- Fleet size: 1
- Destinations: 2
- Headquarters: Tbilisi, Georgia
- Website: mywayairlines.com

Myway Airlines (Georgian: მაივეი ეარლაინს) is a Georgian carrier based at Tbilisi International Airport in Tbilisi, Georgia.

== History ==
In June 2016, Myway Airlines was registered in Tbilisi, Georgia. In October and November 2017, two Boeing 737-800 aircraft were delivered to Myway Airlines.

On 23 January 2018, the airline received its air operator's certificate (AOC) with plans to begin operations in May 2018. Flights between Tbilisi and Tel Aviv began on 28 June 2018.

== Destinations ==
Currently, the airline is operating regular scheduled services along with charter flights to various destinations. As of May 2021, Myway Airlines operates to the following destinations:

Country	City	Airport	Notes
Georgia	Tbilisi	Shota Rustaveli Tbilisi International Airport	Hub
Israel	Tel Aviv	David Ben Gurion International Airport	

== Fleet ==
=== Current fleet ===
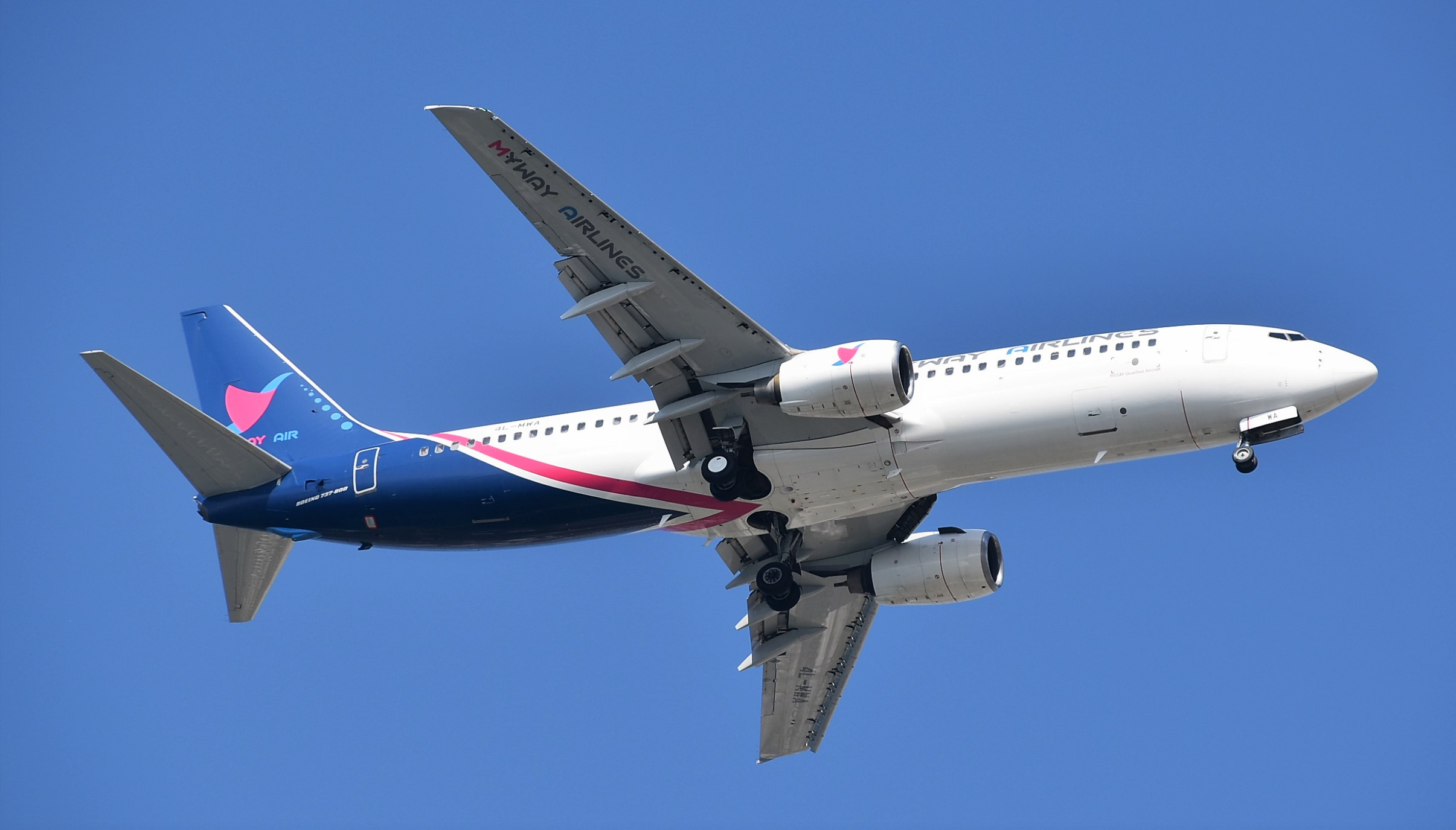
MyWay Airlines Boeing 737-800

As of July 2026, MyWay Airlines operates the following aircraft:

Myway Airlines fleet
Aircraft	In Service	Orders	Passengers			Notes
Aircraft	In Service	Orders	C	Y	Total	Notes
Boeing 777-200ER	1	0				
Total	1	0				

=== Former fleet ===
As of August 2025, MyWay Airlines operated 1 Boeing 737-700BDSF and 1 Boeing 777-200ER

The airline also previously operated the following aircraft:

- 2 Boeing 737-800
