= Transair Georgia =

IATA	ICAO	Call sign
-	-	-
- Headquarters: Georgia

Transair Georgia was an airline based in Georgia.

== Incidents ==
In late-September 1993, three Transair Georgia aircraft were destroyed by Abkhazian rebels over the course of three days, leaving a total of 136 people dead. The first aircraft (a Tu-134) went down in the Black Sea whilst on approach to Sukhumi Dranda Airport, the second (a Tupolev Tu-154, reportedly carrying Georgian troops) went down on the runway at the airport, and the third (another Tu-134) was attacked on the ground with mortar/artillery fire.

	Aircraft type	Incident type
1st aircraft	Tupolev Tu-134	Shootdown
2nd aircraft	Tupolev Tu-154	Shootdown
3rd aircraft	Tupolev Tu-134	Ground attack

== Fleet ==
The Transair Georgia fleet included the following aircraft:

- Tupolev Tu-134
- Tupolev Tu-154
