= Air Van =

Armenian airline

IATA	ICAO	Call sign
-	VAR	-
- Founded: 2003
- Ceased operations: 2005

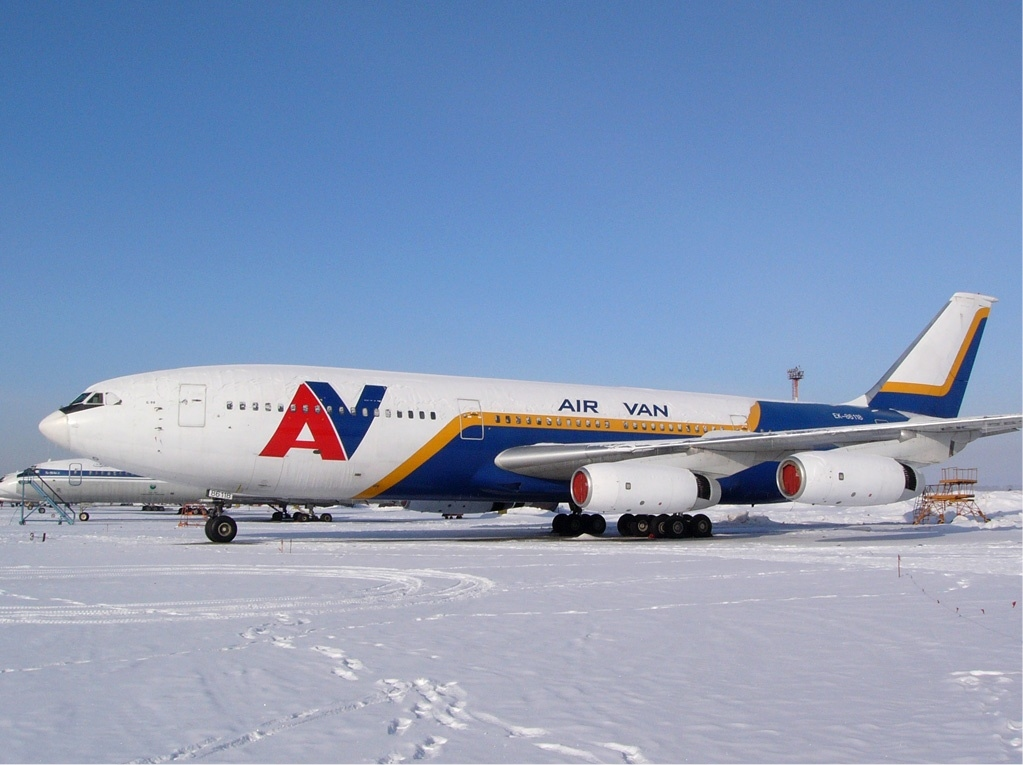
Ilyushin 86

Air-Van Airlines was an airline based in Armenia. It operated two leased Boeing B747-200s and a leased Douglas DC-10 on charter services.

It was forced to suspend operations after the Armenian civil aviation authority decided not to extend its air operator certificate. Air-Van was also forbidden from landing in Switzerland and Belgium. These bans may have been the cause for Air Van to appear on a proposed Europe-wide blacklist of some airlines.
