= Silk Way (disambiguation) =

Silk Way may refer to the following:

- The Silk Road, a network of ancient trade routes connecting the Mediterranean region with the Middle East and Far East
- Silk Way Airlines, a cargo airline from Azerbaijan
- Silk Way Rally, a rally raid
