= Georgian International Airlines =

Georgian airline

IATA	ICAO	Call sign
4L	GNN	GEO-LINE
- Founded: June 2004
- Ceased operations: 2014
- Operating bases: Tbilisi International Airport
- Fleet size: 2
- Headquarters: Tbilisi, Georgia
- Key people: Mikhail Karashvili, MD
- Website: avia.ge

Georgian International Airlines was an airline based in Tbilisi, Georgia.

== History ==
Georgian International Airlines was founded as EuroLine in June 2004 and launched operations later that year. In February 2010, the EuroLine board of directors held a meeting in which they decided to re-brand to Georgian International Airlines with a new logo, name and livery. The move was to help the airline expand its operations network.

The rebranded Georgian International Airlines planned to start flight operations in August 2013. According to its website, the airline planned to implement direct flights to Islamabad, Moscow, Cologne, Tehran and Baghdad using 4 Fokker 100 and 2 Boeing 737-400. However, as of late October 2013, the airline had yet to take possession of any aircraft while also thinking about buying a used Boeing 767-300ER for long-haul flights.

As of January 2014, the airline still hadn't started operations and announced plans to acquire an Airbus A320-200 formerly operated by Mexicana de Aviación.

== Fleet ==
As of January 2014, the Georgian International Airlines fleet consisted of the following aircraft:

Georgian International Airlines fleet
Aircraft	In Fleet	Orders	Passengers	Notes
Fokker 100 and Saab 340	2	—	130	stored at Saarbrücken Airport
