= Caucasus Airlines =

Airline in Georgia

IATA	ICAO	Call sign
NS	SRJ	CAUCASUS
- Hubs: Batumi International Airport
- Headquarters: Batumi, Georgia

Caucasus Airlines was a regional airline based in Georgia which served domestic destinations and countries in the region.

== History ==
The airline was established in 2001 and started operations in November 2002. The airline imposed a voluntary suspension of services in 2004 and ceased operations. Previously known as Silk Route Airways, the name was changed for legal reasons.

== Fleet ==
The Caucasus Airlines fleet included the following aircraft:

- 1 Embraer EMB 120 Brasilia

Caucasus Airlines operated 2 EMB-120 airplanes. Registration numbers 4L-XLA and 4L-XLF.
