= Fly Georgia =

Georgian airline

FlyGeorgia
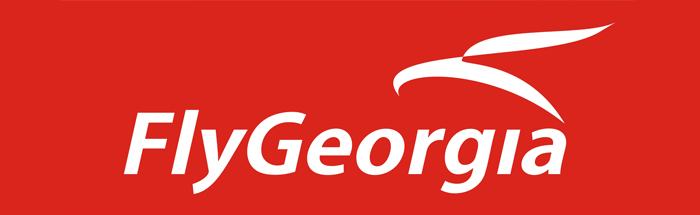
IATA	ICAO	Call sign
9Y	FGE	GEORGIAN WING
- Founded: 2011
- Ceased operations: 2013
- Hubs: Tbilisi International Airport
- Fleet size: 2
- Destinations: 6
- Headquarters: Tbilisi, Georgia
- Website: flygeorgia.ge

FlyGeorgia (Georgian: ფლაი ჯორჯია; IATA: FGE) was the second national airline of Georgia, with its headquarters in Tbilisi, beginning its operations in August 2012. It was a privately owned and controlled airline, which offered flights to a number of destinations in Europe, the Middle East and South Asia as well as in the CIS. As of the end of 2013, its operating license has been suspended. The company slogan was The World Awaits You.

== History ==
Dubai, United Arab Emirates-based Iranians Hoshang Hosseinpour (born 21 March 1967, Tehran), (Note: Hoshang Hosseinpour is also known as Houshang Hosein-Pur or Houshang Shahali Hosseinpour.) Houshang Farsoudeh (born 10 October 1968, Tehran) (Note: Houshang Farsoudeh is also known as Hushang Farsoudeh or Houshang Hossein Farsoudeh.) and Pourya Nayebi (born 25 July 1974, Tehran) (Note: Pourya Nayebi is also known as Pourya Ali Asghar Nayebi.) co-founded Fly Georgia in 2011.

On 30 July 2012, it was officially announced that FlyGeorgia would start operating flights from Tbilisi to Batumi and the first flight would be launched on 3 August 2012. On 6 October 2012, it was officially stated that FGE would start direct flights from Tbilisi to Amsterdam with an Airbus A319.

At the end of October 2012, FlyGeorgia announced it had ordered 2 more A320 aircraft. The first of these aircraft would be delivered at the end of 2012, whilst the second one would be delivered to Tbilisi in March 2013. They would be purchased from the leasing company. Fly Georgia also declared it would start flights to Germany, Ukraine, UAE, Iraq, Brussels, Kazakhstan, Armenia, and many destinations to come.

In September 2013, Fly Georgia's aircraft, an A320 and two leased A319-100s, were seized at the Brussels Airport due to unpaid debts.

On 16 October 2013, the Georgian civil aviation authority suspended FlyGeorgia's license and it is no longer allowed to operate any flights until further notice.

== Destinations ==
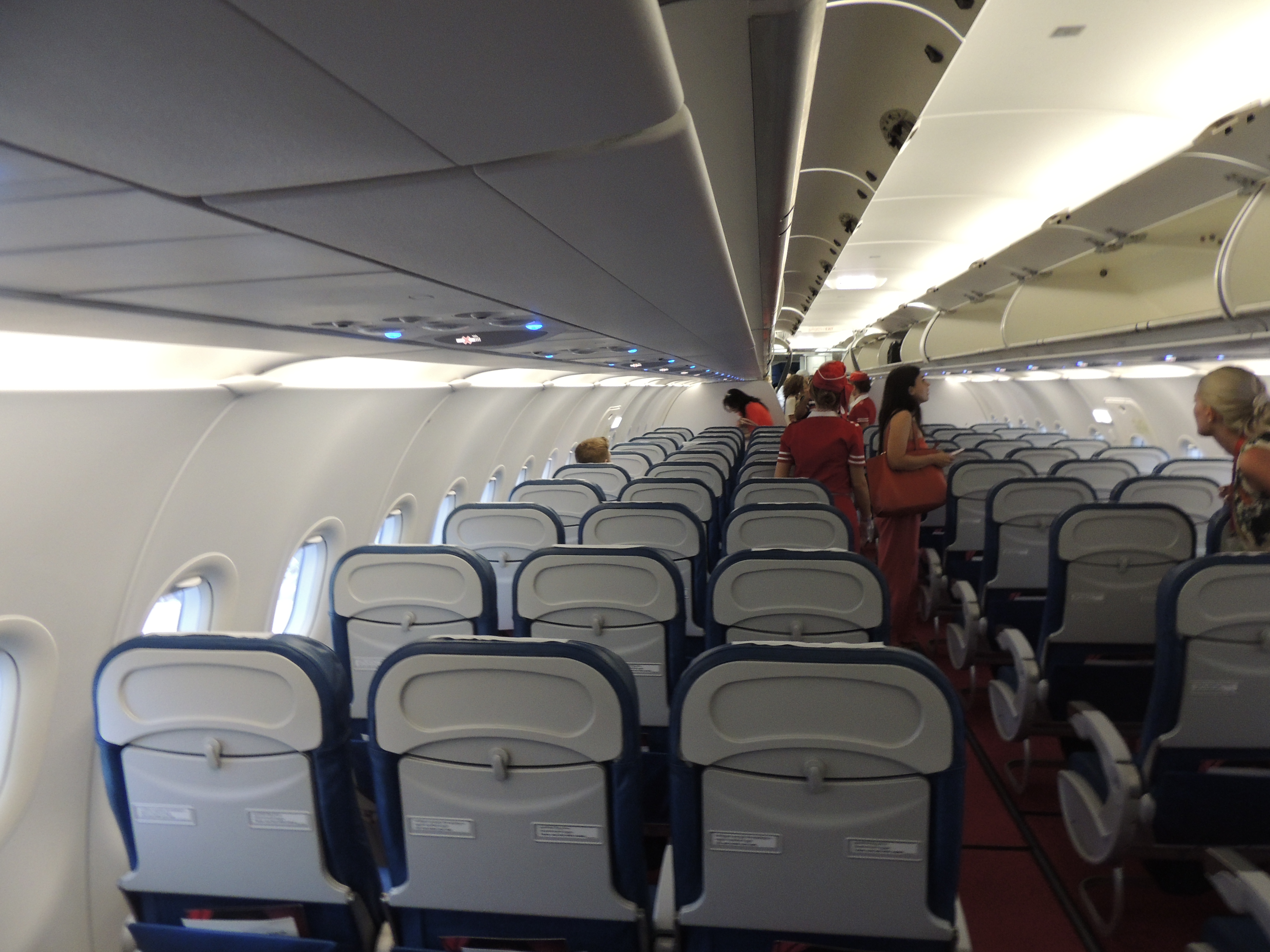
Cabin aboard a FlyGeorgia Airbus aircraft

Hub
Focus city
Future
Seasonal
Terminated route

City	Country	IATA	ICAO	Airport	Refs
Amsterdam	Netherlands	AMS	EHAM	Amsterdam Airport Schiphol	Terminated
Antalya	Turkey	AYT	LTAI	Antalya Airport	Seasonal
Batumi	Georgia	BUS	UGSB	Batumi International Airport	Seasonal
Baghdad	Iraq	BGW	ORBI	Baghdad International Airport	
Brussels	Belgium	BRU	EBBR	Brussels Airport	Terminated
Cairo	Egypt	CAI	HECA	Cairo International Airport	
Dubai	UAE	DXB	OMDB	Dubai Airport	
Düsseldorf	Germany	DUS	EDDL	Düsseldorf Airport	
Erbil	Iraq	EBL	ORER	Erbil International Airport	Terminated
Hurghada	Egypt	HRG	HEGN	Hurghada International Airport	Seasonal
Kyiv	Ukraine	KBP	UKBB	Boryspil International Airport	
Sharm el-Sheikh	Egypt	SSH	HESH	Sharm el-Sheikh International Airport	Seasonal
Tbilisi	Georgia	TBS	UGTB	Tbilisi International Airport	Hub
Tehran	Iran	IKA	OIIE	Imam Khomeini International Airport	

== Fleet ==
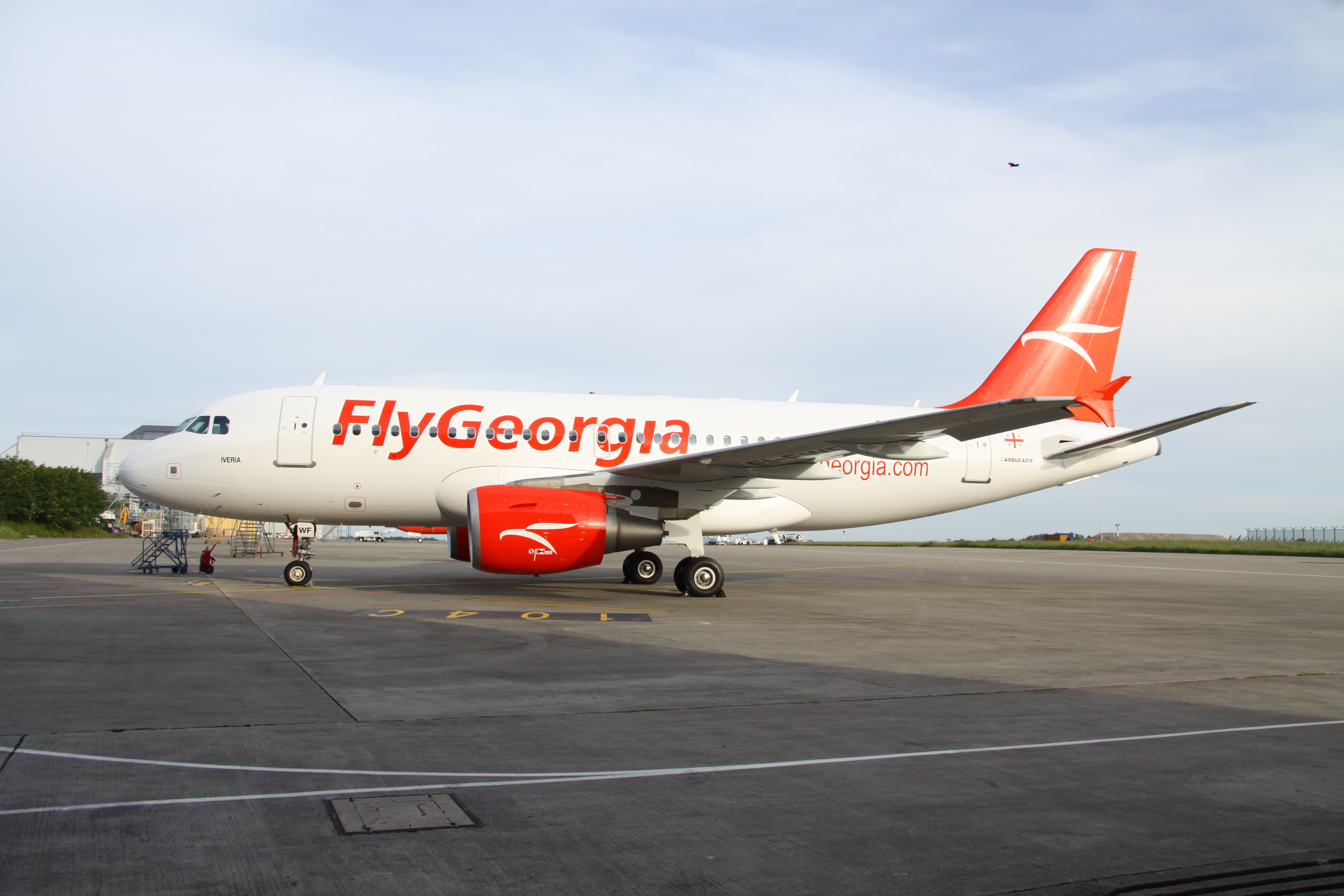
A FlyGeorgia Airbus A319-100

The FlyGeorgia fleet consisted of the following aircraft (as of December 2012):

FlyGeorgia Fleet
Aircraft	Total	Orders	Passengers			Notes
Aircraft	Total	Orders	C	Y	Total	Notes
Airbus A319-100	1	-	12	102	114	
Airbus A320-200	1	-	16	122	138	
Total	2	-				
