= Georgian Airways =

Flag carrier of Georgia

- A Boeing 737-700 of Georgian Airways
IATA	ICAO	Call sign
A9	TGZ	TAMAZI
- Founded: 1993; 33 years ago (as Airzena)
- Hubs: Tbilisi International Airport
- Fleet size: 10
- Destinations: 16
- Headquarters: Tbilisi, Georgia
- Key people: David Gaiashvili (General Director; since 2022)
- Website: https://www.georgian-airways.com

Georgian Airways (Georgian: ჯორჯიან ეარვეისი, romanized: jorjian earveisi), formerly Airzena, is the privately owned flag carrier of Georgia, with its headquarters in Tbilisi. Its main base is Tbilisi International Airport. The company filed for bankruptcy on 31 December 2021, linked to a restructuring procedure, and it has been for sale since January 2022.

== History ==
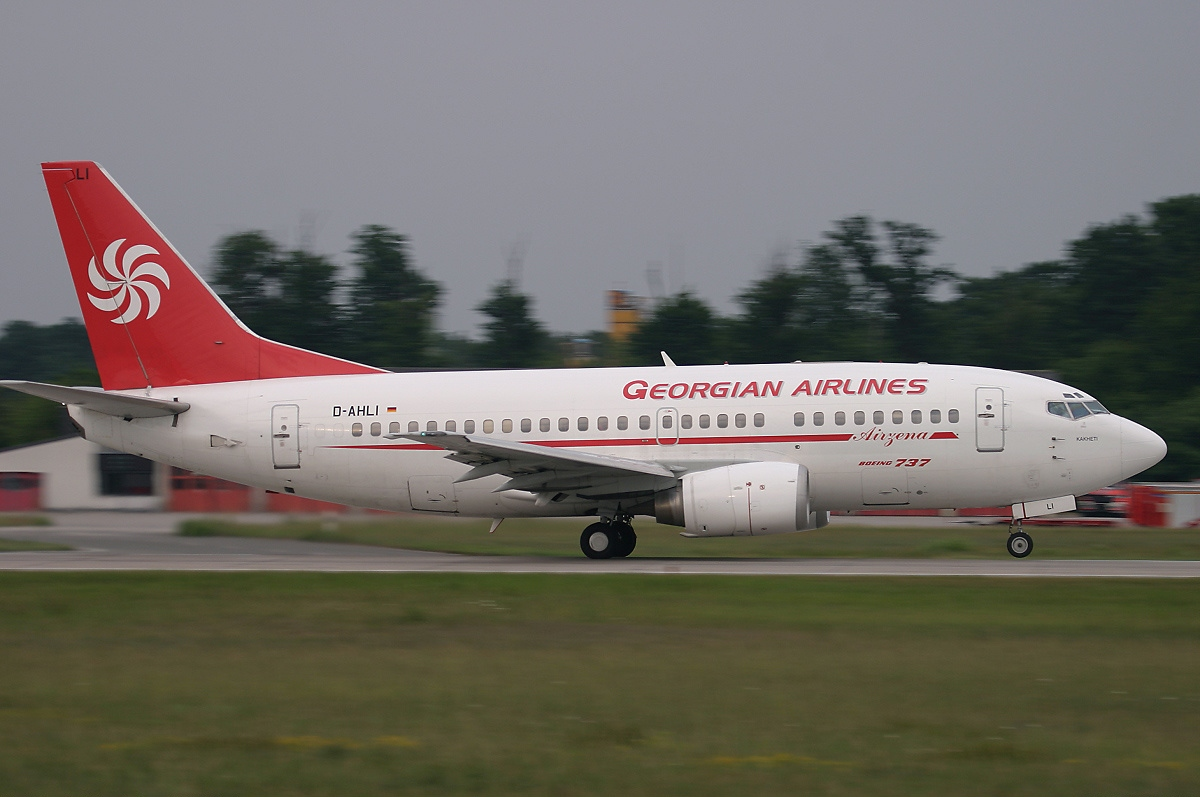
Hapag Lloyd leased Boeing 737-500 (2003)

The airline Airzena was established in September 1993. Initially, Airzena operated charter flights to the United Arab Emirates, Italy, China, Egypt, India, and Syria, as well as a regularly scheduled flight to Vienna. The company managed to achieve recognition and retain its share in the aviation market during the economically and politically complicated period of the 1990s.

In 1999, Airzena became the flag carrier of Georgia. In August 2004, the company changed its name to Georgian Airways. During the first half of the 2000s, the airline's management decided to modernise the fleet, and leased two Boeing 737-500s from Hapag-Lloyd. This was the first case of a Georgian airline operating up-to-date Western equipment.

== Russian sanctions ==
Following what Russia perceived as anti-Russian protests in June 2019, it banned all flights to and from Georgia starting 8 July 2019. Georgian Airways flights to Moscow-Vnukovo have since been operated by Aircompany Armenia via Yerevan. The ban was revoked by Russian president Vladimir Putin on 10 May 2023, and starting 15 May, Georgian Airways announced it would then resume flights to Moscow from 20 May, with the first flight arriving in Vnukovo on that day. In response, Ukrainian president Volodymyr Zelenskyy imposed sanctions against the airline on 1 July.

== Bankruptcy ==
Georgian Airways filed for bankruptcy on 31 December 2021, linked to restructuring proceedings, and the airline was put up for sale in January 2022. The airline is in debt of ₾125,000,000 (€52,000,000), against ₾21,000,000 in assets. The causes include the Russian flight ban since July 2019, but most of all, the COVID-19 pandemic hit the airline hard. The Georgian authorities banned international air traffic for 11 months, with the exception of a number of monthly government mandated flights for repatriation purposes (operated by Georgian Airways). Georgian Airways cut back on its fleet (such as disposing of its Embraer planes) but with the Georgian resumption of international air traffic in February 2021, it could only offer six destinations.

The insolvency plan focused on the year-round profitable routes (Amsterdam, Tel Aviv and Minsk (Note: In practical terms the Minsk flights do not operate.)) and a few profitable seasonal charters, while guaranteeing these flights. Georgian Airways indicated in January 2022 that it would continue to operate the flights. Currently, the airline operates more routes.

== Destinations ==
As of October 2024, Georgian Airways operates scheduled services from Tbilisi International Airport to destinations in the European Union, Israel and Russia, while it jointly sells (but does not operate) flights to Armenia and France.

Country	City	Airport	Notes	Refs
Armenia	Yerevan	Zvartnots International Airport		
Austria	Vienna	Vienna International Airport		
Belgium	Brussels	Brussels Airport		
Cyprus	Larnaca	Larnaca International Airport		
France	Nice	Nice Côte d'Azur Airport		
France	Paris	Charles de Gaulle Airport		
Georgia	Batumi	Alexander Kartveli Batumi International Airport		
Georgia	Kutaisi	David the Builder Kutaisi International Airport	Terminated	
Georgia	Tbilisi	Shota Rustaveli Tbilisi International Airport	Hub	
Germany	Berlin	Berlin Brandenburg Airport		
Israel	Tel Aviv	David Ben Gurion Airport	Terminated	
Italy	Bergamo	Orio al Serio International Airport		
Italy	Bologna	Bologna Guglielmo Marconi Airport		
Italy	Forlì	Forlì Airport		
Italy	Rome	Rome Fiumicino Airport		
Netherlands	Amsterdam	Amsterdam Airport Schiphol		
Qatar	Doha	Hamad International Airport		
Russia	Moscow	Vnukovo International Airport		
Russia	Novosibirsk	Tolmachevo Airport		
Russia	Saint Petersburg	Pulkovo Airport		
Seychelles	Mahé	Seychelles International Airport	Terminated	

=== Partners ===
Georgian Airways partners with the following airlines:

- Aegean Airlines
- Air Astana
- Air Dilijans
- Air France
- Austrian Airlines
- Azerbaijan Airlines
- Delta Air Lines
- El Al
- Emirates
- Iran Air
- KLM

== Fleet ==
=== Current fleet ===
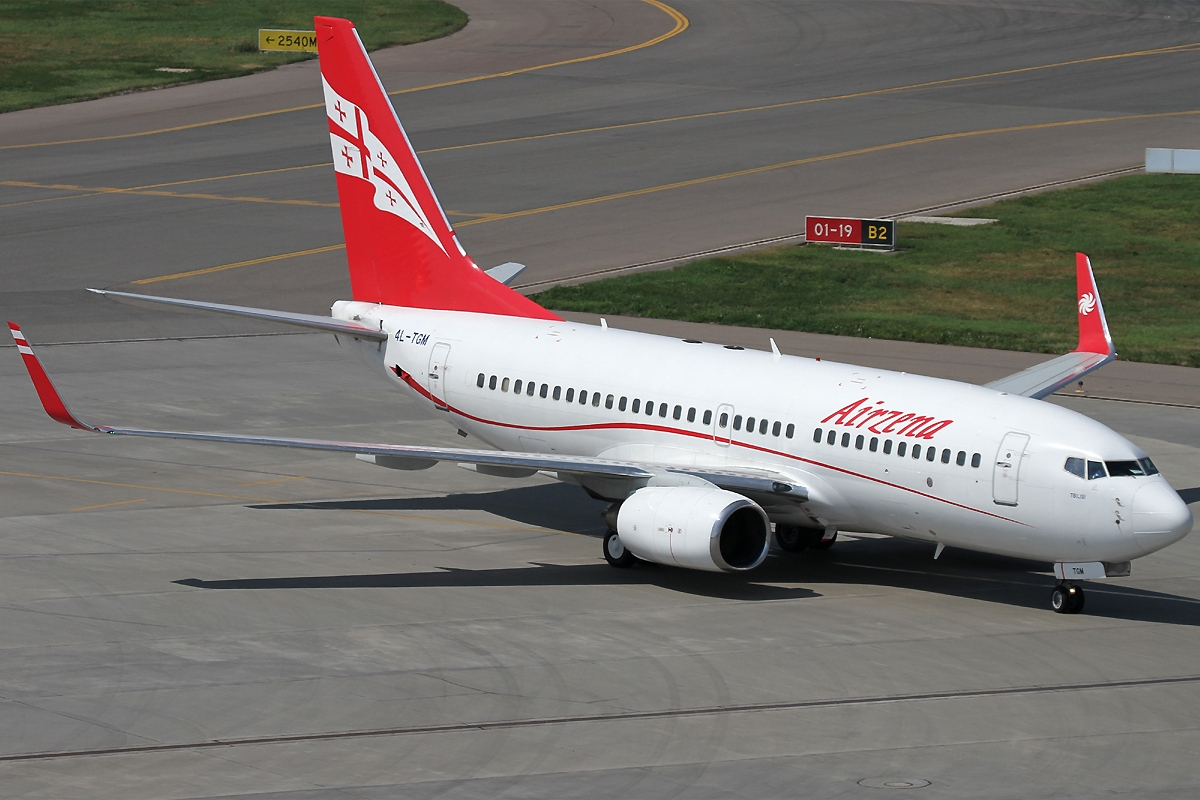
Georgian Airways Boeing 737-700

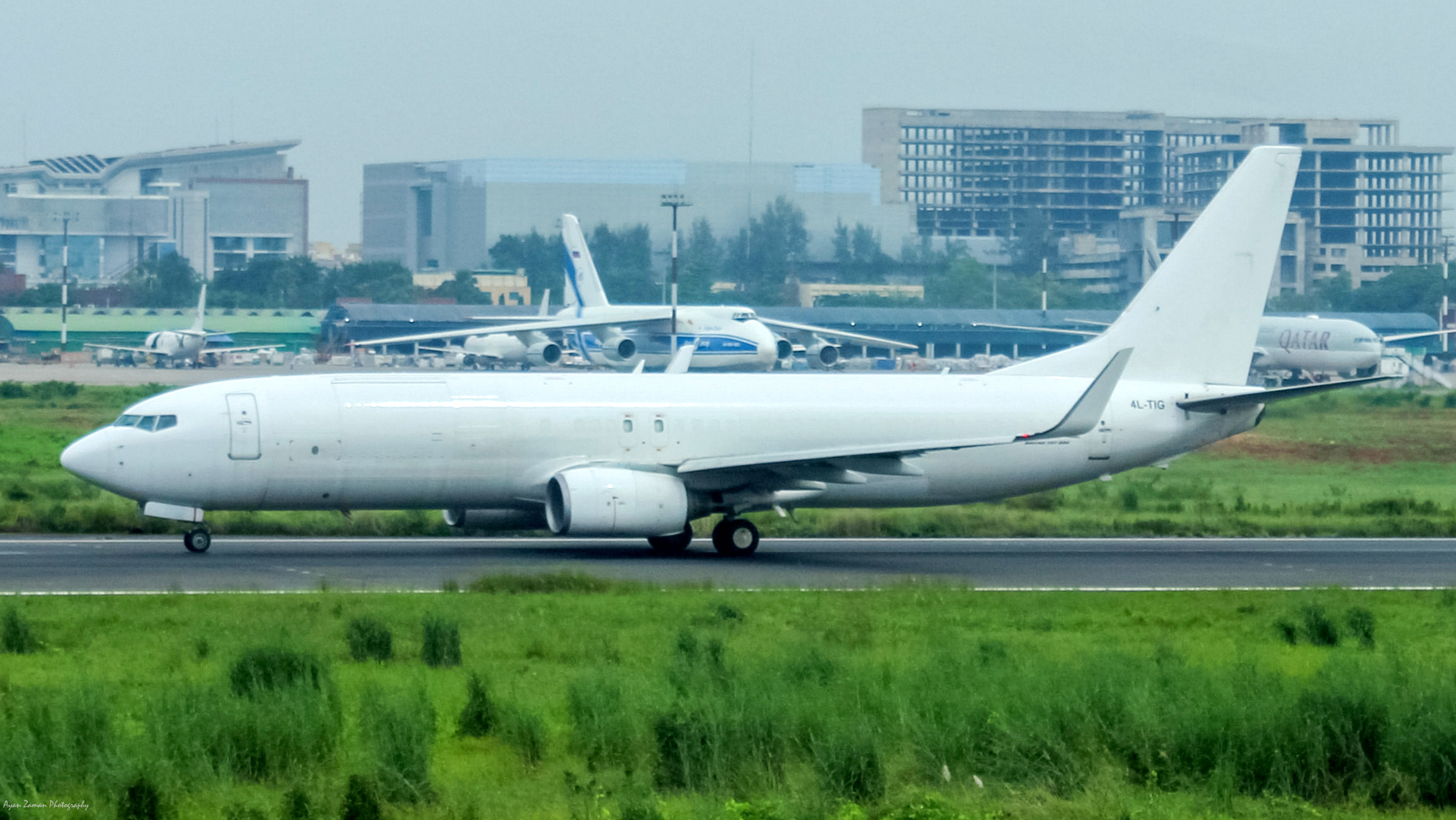
A former Georgian Airways Boeing 737-800F

As of August 2025, Georgian Airways operates the following aircraft:

Georgian Airways fleet
Aircraft	In service	Orders	Passengers			Notes
Aircraft	In service	Orders	J	Y	Total	Notes
Boeing 737-500	1	—	12	104	116	As of July 2026
Boeing 737-700	2	—	12	120	132	As of July 2026
Boeing 737-800	3	—	12	168	180	As of July 2026
Boeing 737-900ER	1	—	—	189	189	As of July 2026
Bombardier CRJ200LR	1	—	6	44	50	Operating under Airzena brand as of July 2026
Bombardier Challenger 850	1	—	VIP			For government and VIP use only.
Bombardier Global 6000	1	—	VIP			For government and VIP use only.
Total	10	—				

=== Former fleet ===
The airline fleet previously included the following aircraft (inconclusive list)

- Boeing 737-300
- Boeing 737-400
- Boeing 737-500
- Boeing 737-800
- Boeing 767-300ER
- Bombardier CRJ100ER
- Embraer 190
- Embraer 195

== Safety rating, accidents and incidents ==
Georgian Airways has a 6/7 safety rating in AirlineRatings.

- On 4 April 2011, Georgian Airways Flight 834, a charter flight for a United Nations mission, operated by a Georgian Airways Bombardier CRJ100ER (registered as 4L-GAE) crashed at N'djili Airport, Kinshasa, Democratic Republic of the Congo, while flying at very low altitude in 'extreme inclement' weather. 32 of the 33 people on board were killed.
