= Air Dilijans =

Airline of Armenia

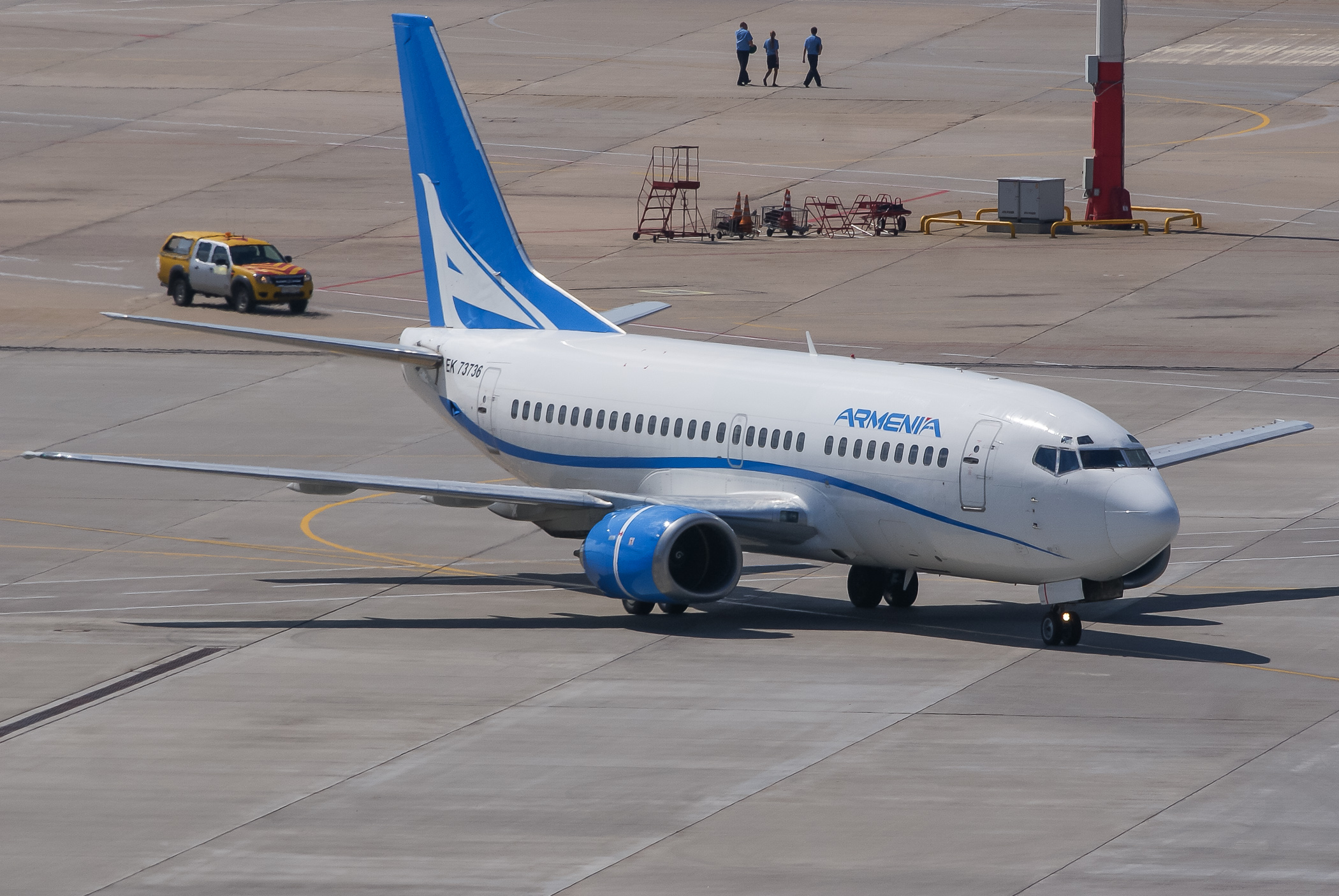
- Boeing 737-500
IATA	ICAO	Call sign
RM	NGT	NIKA
- Founded: 25 November 2015
- Ceased operations: 3 February 2025
- AOC #: 065
- Hubs: Zvartnots International Airport; Shirak International Airport
- Fleet size: 0
- Destinations: 0
- Headquarters: Yerevan, Armenia
- Key people: Tamaz Gaiashvili (Co-Founder)
- Website: airdilijans.com

Air Dilijans (Armenian: Էյր Դիլիջանս), formerly Aircompany Armenia, was an Armenian airline company that was founded on 25 November 2015 and commenced operations on 21 April 2016. Its headquarters were located in Yerevan.

== History ==
Aircompany Armenia logo.

Aircompany Armenia was founded on 25 November 2015 by Tamaz Gaishvili and Robert Oganesian after Armavia had suspended all flights in 2013. Flight operations were launched on April 21, 2016. On 20 March 2023, the airline was renamed Air Dilijans LLC.

As of 7 August 2023 all flights were suspended. In late 2024, the airline was put on the list of airlines banned in the European Union, together with all other Armenian airlines. The airline lost its air operator's certificate on 3 February 2025, after it sold its last aircraft to Georgian Airways. Flight operations were briefly reactivated between 2024 and 3 February 2025. AOC was lost again in that same year.

== Destinations ==
As of 2024, Air Dilijans does not operate any flights. The company formerly operated flights to Georgia, Iran, Iraq, and Russia.

Country	City	Airport	Notes	Refs
Armenia	Yerevan	Zvartnots International Airport	Hub	

=== Codeshare agreements ===
Air Dilijans had codeshare agreements with the following airline:

- Georgian Airways

== Fleet ==
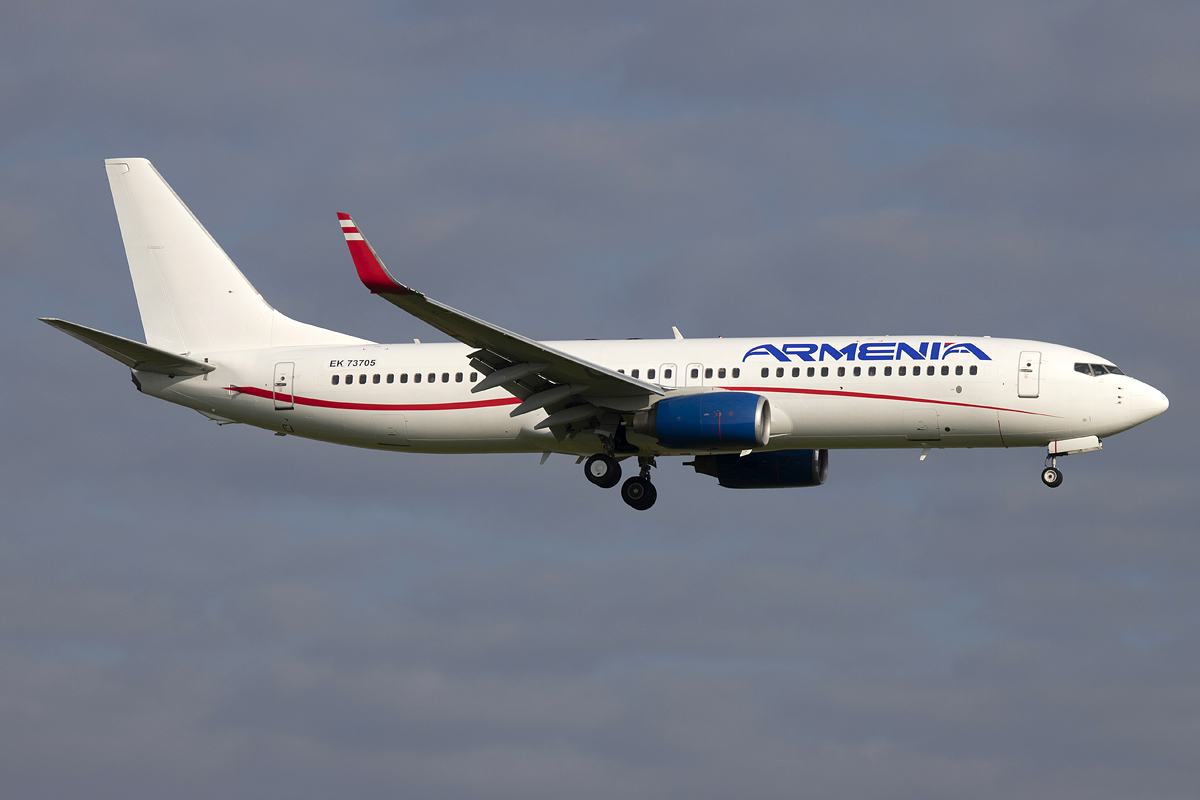
Aircompany Armenia Boeing 737-800

The Air Dilijans fleet consisted of the following aircraft (as of April 2025):

Air Dilijans fleet
Aircraft	In service	Orders	Passengers			Notes
Aircraft	In service	Orders	J	Y	Total	Notes
0	0	0				

== See also ==
- List of airlines of Armenia
- List of defunct airlines of Armenia
- Transport in Armenia
