= Tbilisi International Airport =

International airport in Tbilisi, Georgia

Shota Rustaveli Tbilisi International Airport

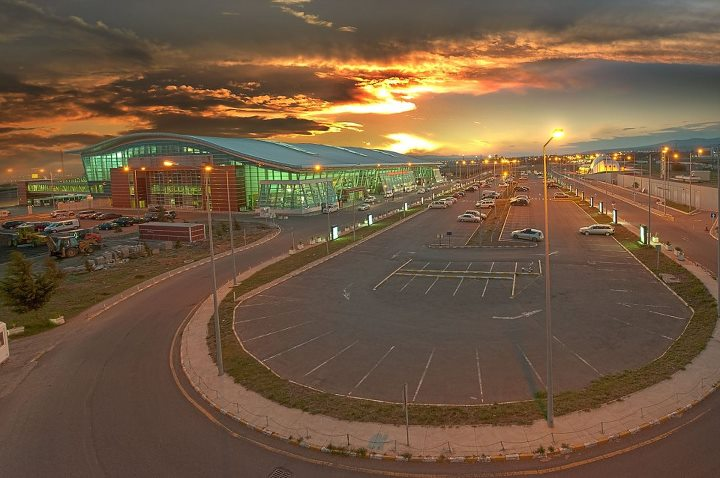
- IATA: TBS; ICAO: UGTB

Summary
- Airport type: Public
- Owner: United Airports of Georgia LLC
- Operator: TAV Airports Holding
- Serves: Tbilisi
- Location: Tbilisi, Georgia
- Hub for: Georgian Airways; MyWay Airlines; Camex; Geosky
- Elevation AMSL: 1,624 ft (495 m)
- Coordinates: 41°40′09″N 044°57′17″E
- Website: https://tbilisiairport.com/

Map
- Location within Georgia TBS/UGTB (Asia) TBS/UGTB (West and Central Asia)

Runways
Direction	Length		Surface
Direction	m	ft	Surface
13R/31L	3,000	9,843	Concrete
13L/31R (closed)	2,500	8,202	Asphalt

Helipads
Number	Length		Surface
Number	m	ft	Surface
H1	30	98	Asphalt/Concrete

Statistics (2024)
- Passengers: 4,750,830
- Passenger change 23-24: ▲25%
- Source: Georgian AIP at EUROCONTROL

Shota Rustaveli Tbilisi International Airport (Georgian: თბილისის შოთა რუსთაველის სახელობის საერთაშორისო აეროპორტი) (IATA: TBS, ICAO: UGTB) is the busiest international airport in Georgia, located 17 km (11 mi) southeast of capital Tbilisi. The airport handled 4.75 million passengers in 2024. The airport is operated by TAV Airports Holding, making it a part of Groupe ADP.

Over 45 airlines operate from the airport, with nonstop or direct flights to over 25 countries.

Tbilisi Airport is a hub for Georgian Airways, flag carrier of Georgia, as well as for MyWay Airlines and Camex.

In 2015, Tbilisi City Assembly named the airport after medieval Georgian poet Shota Rustaveli (1160–1220).

== General ==
Tbilisi Airport is home to Georgian flag carrier Georgian Airways and MyWay Airlines, which was founded in 2017. The airport is served by approximately 30 airlines, mainly from Europe, the Middle East, and Central Asia serving roughly 30 destinations out of Tbilisi. Due to the increasing popularity of Georgia and the city of Tbilisi as a tourist destination, the number of travelers grew since 2010 from 1 million to almost 4 million until the outbreak of the coronavirus pandemic. The airspace of Georgia was closed for most of 2020 with the exception of government-mandated expatriation flights, but regular international air traffic resumed as of February 2021.

Following a political row in June 2019, Russia banned flights to and from Georgia starting 8 July 2019. Georgian Airways from Tbilisi to Moscow-Vnukovo have since been operated by Aircompany Armenia through Yerevan. The ban was still in effect at the end of 2021. The Kremlin has also banned all Russian airlines from flying to Georgia. A similar ban was in effect during 2006–2008.

The George W. Bush Avenue (Kakheti Highway) leads from the airport to the center of Tbilisi.

== History ==
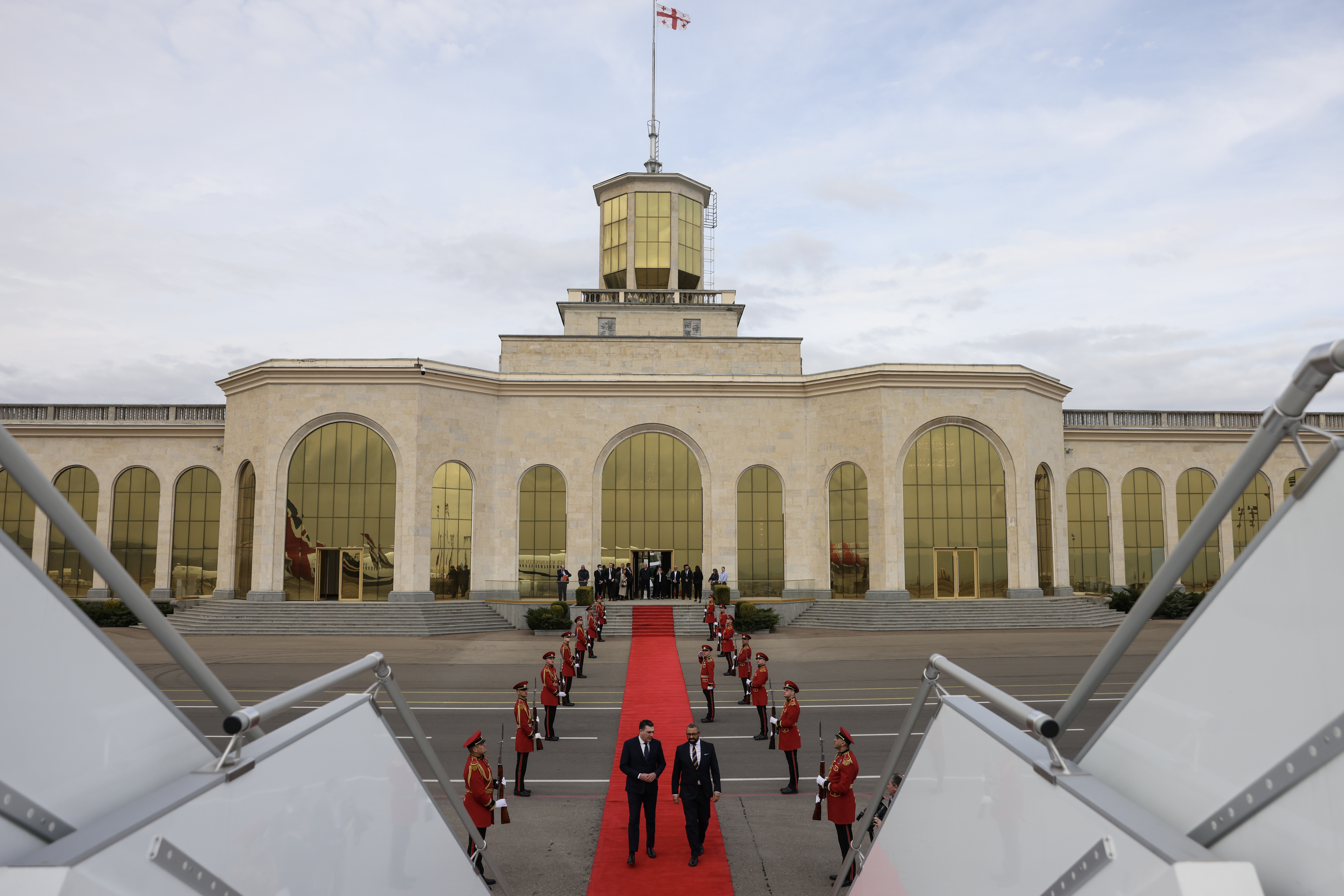
Terminal of 1952, now VIP lounge

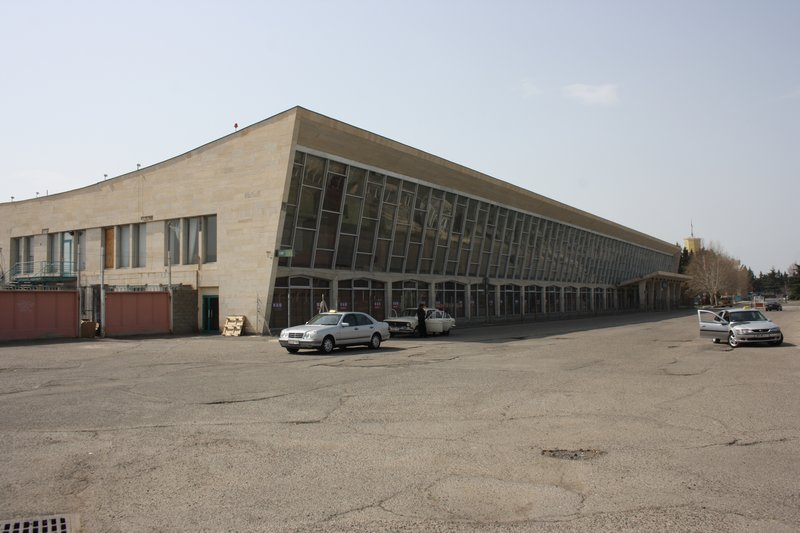
Terminal of 1968, now disused

Second terminal building was completed in 1968, designed by the chief architect Vladimer Beridze and others in the International Style, now is likewise out of public service.

In 1981, Tbilisi airport was the 12th largest airport in the Soviet Union, with 1,478,000 passengers on so-called central lines, which were flights connecting Tbilisi with cities in other Soviet republics. After the dissolution of the Soviet Union, the civil war and the economic crisis in the newly independent Georgia, passenger numbers had dropped to 230,000 by 1998.

Tbilisi International Airport is operated by TAV Airports Holding (TAV) Urban Georgia since October 2005 whose concession has been extended until at least 2027. In Georgia, the company also operates Batumi International Airport for a 20-year term since May 2007. TAV Airports Holding, which owns a 76% share in Tbilisi airport operator TAV Urban Georgia, agreed with the Georgian state-owned United Airports of Georgia to reconstruct and extend the unused runway, one of the two runways at the Tbilisi airport, in line with ICAO standards to accept all types of aircraft, including the Boeing 747-8, Airbus A380-800, Antonov An-225 and Antonov An-124. A new F Code taxiway was also planned.

=== Modernisation ===
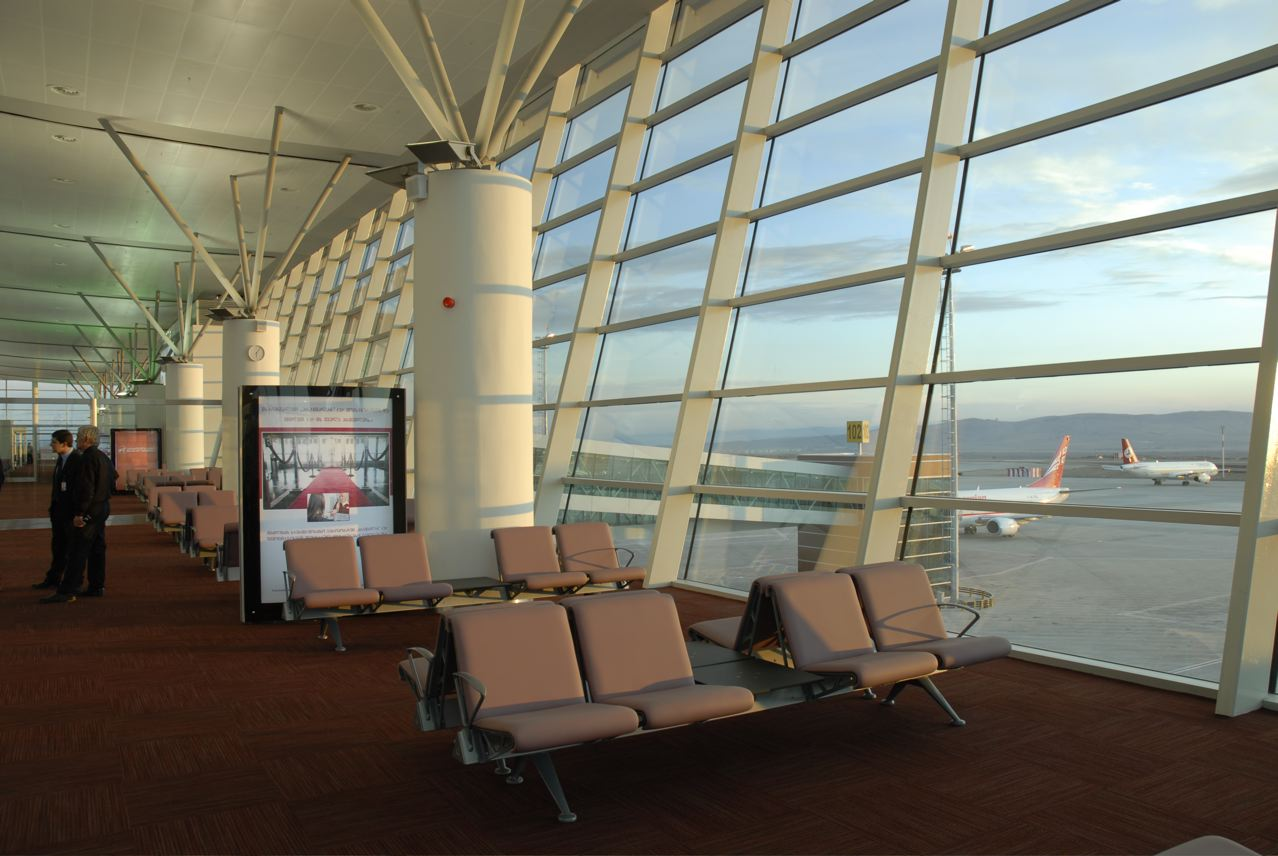
2007 departure lounge

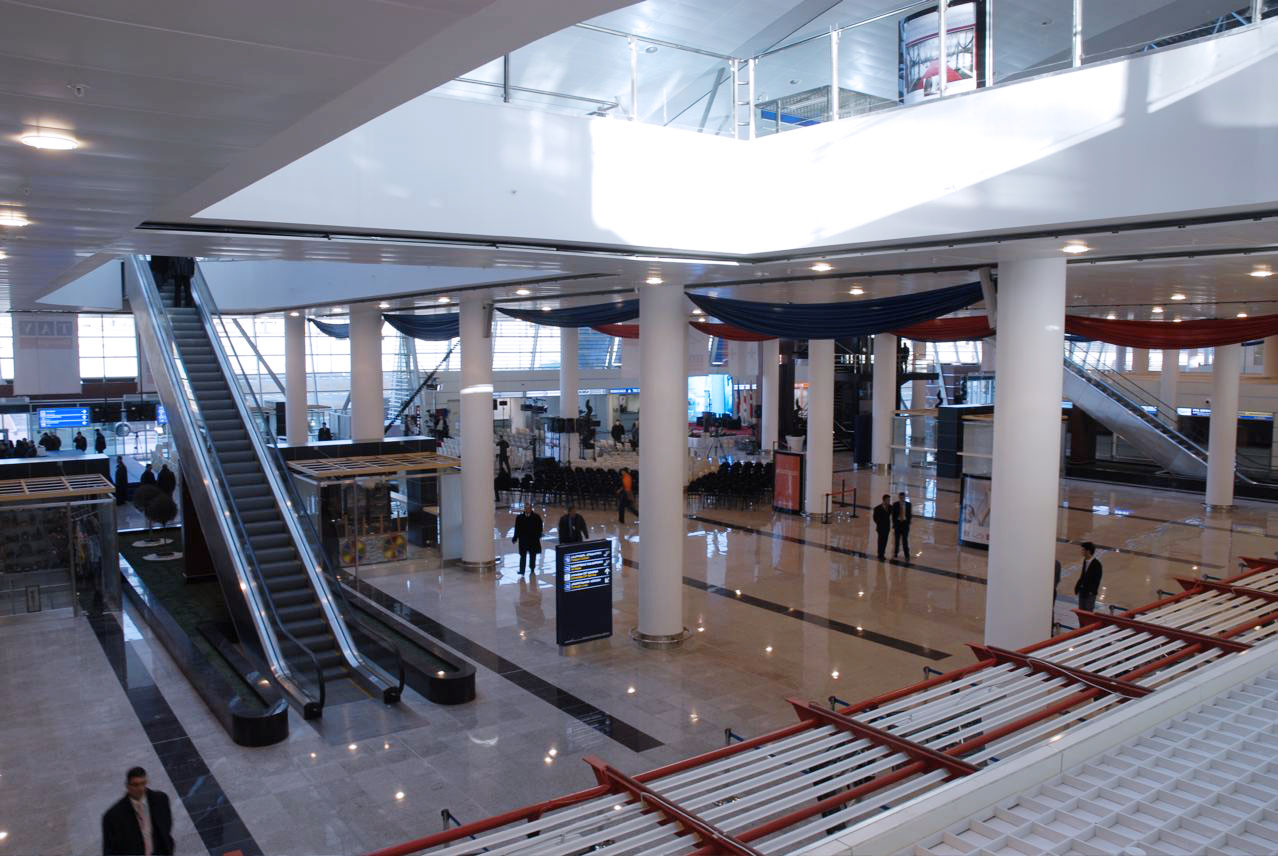
Ground floor check-in area

February 2007 saw the completion of a US$90.5 million reconstruction project, with the construction of a new international terminal, a car park, improvements to the apron, taxiway and runway and the acquisition of ground handling equipment and an annual passenger capacity of 2.8 million. A rail link to the city centre was constructed, with an infrequent rail service of two trains per day each way. The airport got a contemporary and functional design, to provide an optimized flow of both passengers and luggage from the parking lot to the planes, with a 25,000 m^{2} (270,000 sq ft) total usable area, while future expansions can be implemented without interrupting terminal operations. Various food and beverage operations have been incorporated in the new terminal, including four duty-free stores. The implementing party for the project was TAV Urban Georgia, a concessionaire and Special-purpose entity for the construction and operation of the airport, and the project was financed by the International Finance Corporation (IFC) and European Bank for Reconstruction and Development (EBRD).

In 2016, the main runway of the airport was renovated and equipped with new navigation lighting. Runway guard lights and guidance signs at all the holding positions on the airport's main runway were added. The instrument landing system was also upgraded. The airfield lighting control and monitoring system was upgraded, including installation of new lighting signals on all four taxiways. In 2017, a new arrival terminal with an area of 12,000 square metres (130,000 sq ft), integrated with the existing terminal building, was completed to meet the increasing numbers of travelers. The terminal's capacity was increased to 3.5 million passengers per year. In addition to the expansion of the terminal building, this $33 million project implemented, among other things, a new boarding bridge with two exits, five new aircraft parking spaces, three 150-metre (490 ft) luggage racks and a new parking lot for 250 cars.

A new Tbilisi Metro overground line linking the airport with the city was announced in October 2018. The proposed extension would connect the airport with Samgori metro station as transfer point with the existing metro line. Construction was set to begin in late 2019, but the project was effectively abandoned in spring 2021 when a feasibility study did not produce the desired outcome.

== Airlines and destinations ==
Tbilisi Airport mainly serves destinations in Europe and the Middle East. Below are destinations served according to press releases and the schedules authorised by the Georgian Civil Aviation Agency on a seasonal basis.

=== Passenger ===
Airlines	Destinations
Aegean Airlines	Athens
Air Arabia	Sharjah, Abu Dhabi
Air Astana	Almaty
Air China	Ürümqi
Air Serbia	Belgrade
Air Samarkand	Seasonal charter: Tashkent
airBaltic	Riga
AJet	Ankara, Istanbul–Sabiha Gökçen
arkia	Tel Aviv
Austrian Airlines	Vienna
Azerbaijan Airlines	Baku
azimuth	Krasnodar, Mineralnye Vody, Moscow–Vnukovo, Saint Petersburg, Sochi, Ufa
Belavia	Minsk
British Airways	London–Heathrow
Centrum Air	Tashkent
China Eastern Airlines	Shanghai–Pudong
China Southern Airlines	Ürümqi
Condor	Frankfurt
Dan Air	Bucharest–Otopeni
easyJet	Geneva, London–Luton, Milan–Malpensa
Edelweiss Air	Zürich
Eurowings	Düsseldorf
Fly Baghdad	Baghdad (suspended)
Flydubai	Dubai–International
Fly Khiva	Tashkent
Flynas	Jeddah, Riyadh
FlyOne	Chișinău, Yerevan
Georgian Airways	Amsterdam, Batumi, Bergamo, Berlin, Doha, Larnaca, Moscow–Vnukovo, Nice, Novosibirsk, Paris–Charles de Gaulle, Rome–Fiumicino, Saint Petersburg, Vienna, Yerevan; Seasonal: Forlì (suspended)
Gulf Air	Bahrain
Iran Aseman Airlines	Tehran–Imam Khomeini (suspended)
Israir	Tel Aviv
Jazeera Airways	Kuwait City
Jordan Aviation	Amman–Queen Alia
Kuwait Airways	Kuwait City
LOT Polish Airlines	Warsaw
Lufthansa	Munich
Norwegian Air Shuttle	Copenhagen
Pegasus Airlines	Istanbul–Sabiha Gökçen
Qatar Airways	Doha
Qeshm Air	Tehran–Imam Khomeini (suspended)
Red Wings Airlines	Kazan, Krasnodar, Moscow–Zhukovsky, Nizhny Novgorod, Saint Petersburg, Samara, Sochi, Tyumen, Yekaterinburg
SCAT Airlines	Aktau, Şymkent
Sky Express	Athens
Somon Air	Dushanbe
SkyUp Airlines	Chișinău
Sundor	Tel Aviv
Transavia	Amsterdam, Paris–Orly
Turkish Airlines	Istanbul
Uzbekistan Airways	Tashkent
Varesh Airlines	Tehran–Imam Khomeini (suspended)

=== Cargo ===
Airlines	Destinations
SF Airlines	Ürümqi

== Statistics ==
Annual passenger statistics Tbilisi International Airport
Year	Passengers	Change
2025	5,414,762	▲
2024	4,750,425	▲25%
2023	3,694,052	▲23%
2022	2,998,785	▲78%
2021	1,683,696	▲185%
2020	590,089	▼84.0%
2019	3,692,202	▼3.1%
2018	3,808,619	▲20.4%
2017	3,164,139	▲40.5%
2016	2,252,535	▲22.0%
2015	1,847,111	▲17.3%
2014	1,575,386	▲9.7%
2013	1,436,046	▲17.8%
2012	1,219,175	▲15.2%
2011	1,058,679	▲28.7%
2010	822,772	▲17.1%
2009	702,916	▼1.7%
2008	714,976	▲16.1%
2007	615,873	▲8.5%
2006	567,402	▲3.7%
2005	547,150	Steady

Top 5 Most Popular Routes
Country	Destination	Airport	Weekly flights	Airlines
Turkey	Istanbul	Istanbul Airport, Sabiha Gökçen Airport	52	Turkish Airlines (4 daily), Pegasus Airlines (17 weekly), AnadoluJet (1 daily)
Israel	Tel Aviv	Ben Gurion Airport	23	Georgian Airways (12 weekly), Israir Airlines (5 weekly), El Al (4 weekly), Arkia (2 weekly)
UAE	Dubai	Dubai-International	21	flydubai (3 daily)
Azerbaijan	Baku	Heydar Aliyev Airport	21	Buta Airways (3 daily)
Armenia	Yerevan	Zvartnots International Airport	21	Aircompany Armenia (2 daily), FlyOne Armenia (4 weekly), Fly Arna (3 weekly)

== Accidents ==
On 20 July 1992, a Tupolev Tu-154 cargo plane loaded with about 20 tons of tea (carrying more than 2 tons over the weight limit for a safe take-off) overran the runway and crashed during a takeoff attempt, killing all 24 people aboard and 4 on the ground.

== See also ==
- Georgian Civil Aviation Administration
- List of the busiest airports in the former USSR
- List of airports in Georgia
- Transport in Georgia
