= Flight 513 =

Flight 513 may refer to:

- TWA Flight 513, crashed on 11 July 1946
- Aeroflot Flight 513, crashed on 8 March 1965
