= Aeroflot Flight 5484 =

1979 aviation accident

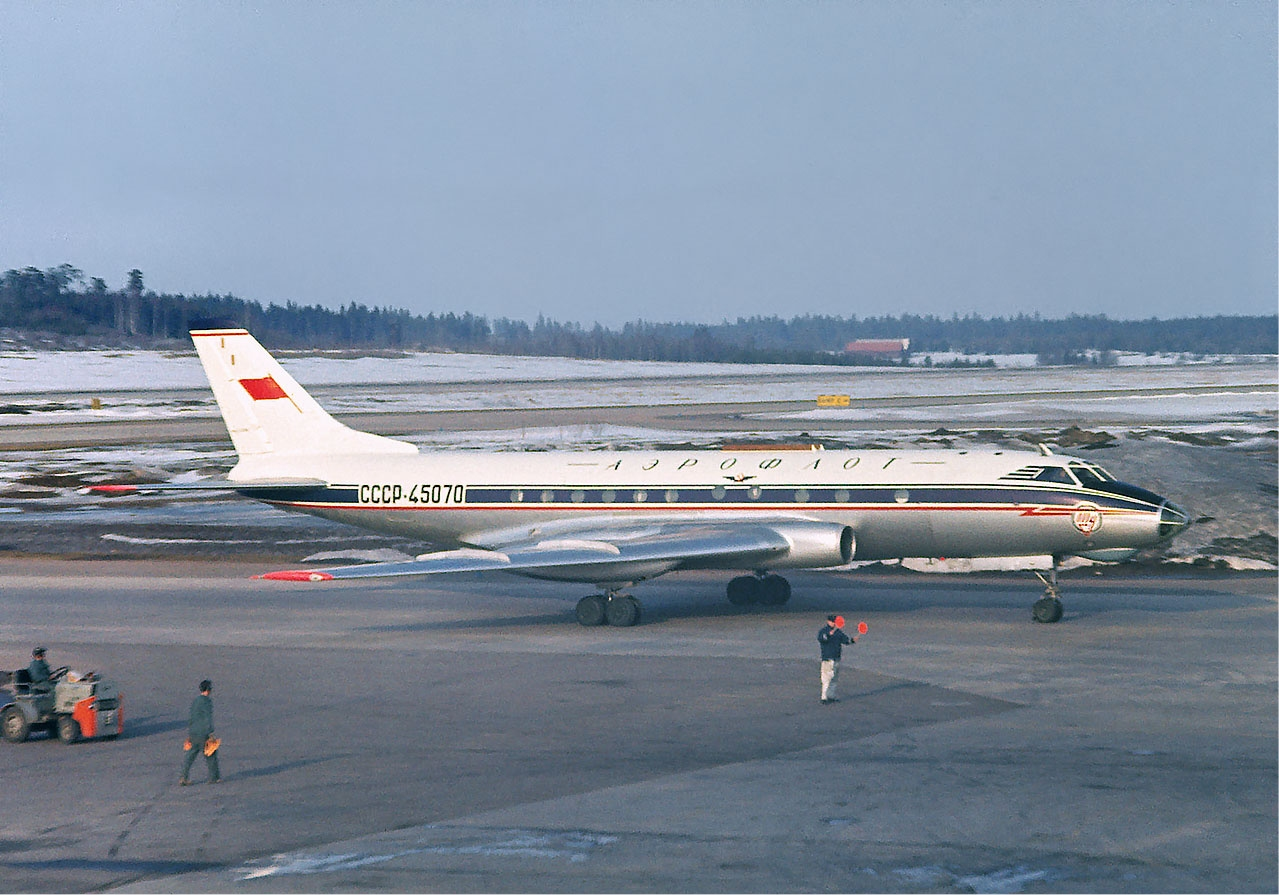
- An Aeroflot Tu-124, similar to the one involved in the accident

Accident
- Date: 29 August 1979
- Summary: Loss of control followed by mid air breakup
- Site: Town of Inokovka, Vorona River floodplains, Tambov Oblast, Russian SFSR; 52°31′30″N 42°36′0″E

Aircraft
- Aircraft type: Tupolev Tu-124V
- Operator: Aeroflot
- Registration: CCCP-45038
- Flight origin: Odesa International Airport, Odesa, Ukrainian SSR
- Stopover: Boryspil International Airport, Kyiv, Ukrainian SSR
- Destination: Kazan Airport, Kazan, Tatar ASSR, Russian SFSR
- Passengers: 58
- Crew: 5
- Fatalities: 63
- Survivors: 0

Aeroflot Flight 5484 was a scheduled domestic passenger flight from Odesa in Soviet Ukraine, to Kazan, the capital of Tatarstan, with a stopover in Kyiv. The aircraft experienced loss of control followed by breaking up in the air on 29 August 1979 over the Tambov Oblast, killing all 63 people on board. It remains the deadliest Tu-124 crash and regular passenger services with the Tu-124 were permanently suspended after the accident, but the Tu-124 was still used by the Soviet military after the accident.

== Aircraft and crew ==
The aircraft involved in the accident was a Tupolev Tu-124V powered by two Soloviev D-20P engines, registered as CCCP-45038 to the Privolzhsk Civil Aviation Directorate of Aeroflot. At the time of the accident, the aircraft had flown 23,232 flight hours and sustained 18,369 pressurization cycles. The five crew members that were aboard the flight consisted of a captain, co-pilot, navigator, flight engineer and one flight attendant.

== Synopsis ==
Flight 5484 departed from the stopover at Kyiv Boryspil Airport on August 28 at 23:21 MSK - Moscow Time (22:21 local time) with five crew members and 58 passengers aboard, including five children. The night was clear with visibility ranging from 10 to 20 km (6.2 to 12.4 mi; 5.4 to 10.8 nmi). After takeoff the flight climbed to a cruising altitude of 9,000 metres (30,000 ft) and maintained a speed of 525–530 km/h (326–329 mph; 283–286 kn). At 00:23 MSK the flight contacted Penza air traffic control to report entering their airspace. That was the last time the flight made contact with controllers.

The flaps were extended for unknown reasons at 00:24:35 while the Tu-124 was at a speed of 530 km/h (330 mph; 290 kn) and flying at a heading of 65°. The crew immediately noticed the aircraft began to lose altitude and they switched off the autopilot at 00:24:43. The flaps did not retract and the position of the flaps led to the aircraft descending quickly; the crew pulled on the control column in attempt to level the aircraft, which levelled briefly before the aircraft went into a roll. The force on the control column was weakened at 00:24:52, and thereafter the flaps fully extended to 30° putting the aircraft in a steep dive that quickly exceeded the aircraft maximum safe speed of 590 km/h (370 mph; 320 kn).

At 00:25:13 MSK, less than a minute after the flaps were extended, the aircraft was at an altitude of 6,000 metres (20,000 ft) and flying at a speed of 660 km/h (360 kn; 410 mph) with a rate of descent of 36 m/s (7,100 ft/min), the inboard flap tore off the right wing, followed by the outboard flaps tearing off; the Tu-124 was put into a spin rotating 45°/s (7.5 rpm). At 00:26 the damaged airliner reached an altitude of 3,000 metres (9,800 ft) while at a speed of 860 km/h (460 kn; 530 mph) and a rate of descent of 280 metres per second (55,000 ft/min), putting a 5g load on the aircraft, resulting in the left wing tearing off the airliner and the fuselage breaking apart in mid-air.

The wreckage of the crash was found at 07:40 MSK - Moscow Time in the town of Inokovka, on the floodplains of the Vorona River in Tambov Oblast in the Russian SFSR. The wreckage was spread across an area 10,750 by 1,650 metres (35,270 by 5,410 ft), with fragments of the fuselage in an area of 10,000 by 1,200 metres (32,800 by 3,900 ft). All 63 passengers and crew were killed in the accident, which remains the deadliest Tu-124 crash in aviation history.

== Conclusions ==
The exact reason for the flaps being released at cruising altitude was not discovered because major portions of the flap control system were not found among the wreckage. The board did speculate several possible causes but produced no definitive cause for the release of the flaps in the first place. Possible causes were as described:

1. It was possible that the pilot in command accidentally threw the switch to release the flaps without realizing it. Tests of the lock on that switch showed that accidentally activating it was indeed possible.
2. Electrical malfunction of the signals in the flap control system; investigators speculated if it is possible that a signal from a nearby wire could have activated it, but not quickly, and such issue would not have been detected by mechanics. However, six Tu-124 aircraft with identical flap control systems were examined to test this hypothesis but all the tests showed the flap control system to be in safe working order.

It is also unknown why the crew weakened their grip on the control column at 00:25:13, which led to the aircraft going into a sharp rate of descent. Possible reasons for this include:

1. The crew could have been misled by the indications of the variometer, which indicated the aircraft was increasing altitude at speeds between 15 and 20 m/s (49 and 66 ft/s) when it was actually decreasing at a rate of 40–45 m/s (130–150 ft/s);
2. The crew could have diverted their attention towards other tasks in the cockpit, ex. changing engine power, attempting to adjust the flaps, checking the position of the spoilers, etc.;
3. Overload and overspeed on the control column;
4. The overload from the rate of descent limiting the crew's capability to apply sufficient force;
5. any combination of the above factors.

== Aftermath ==
The Tupolev Tu-124 was withdrawn from regular passenger service in the USSR, but was still used by the Soviet military. The design and placement of the switch to release the flaps was changed to prevent accidental activation of the flaps.
