= Tupolev Tu-124 =

Soviet first generation jet airliner

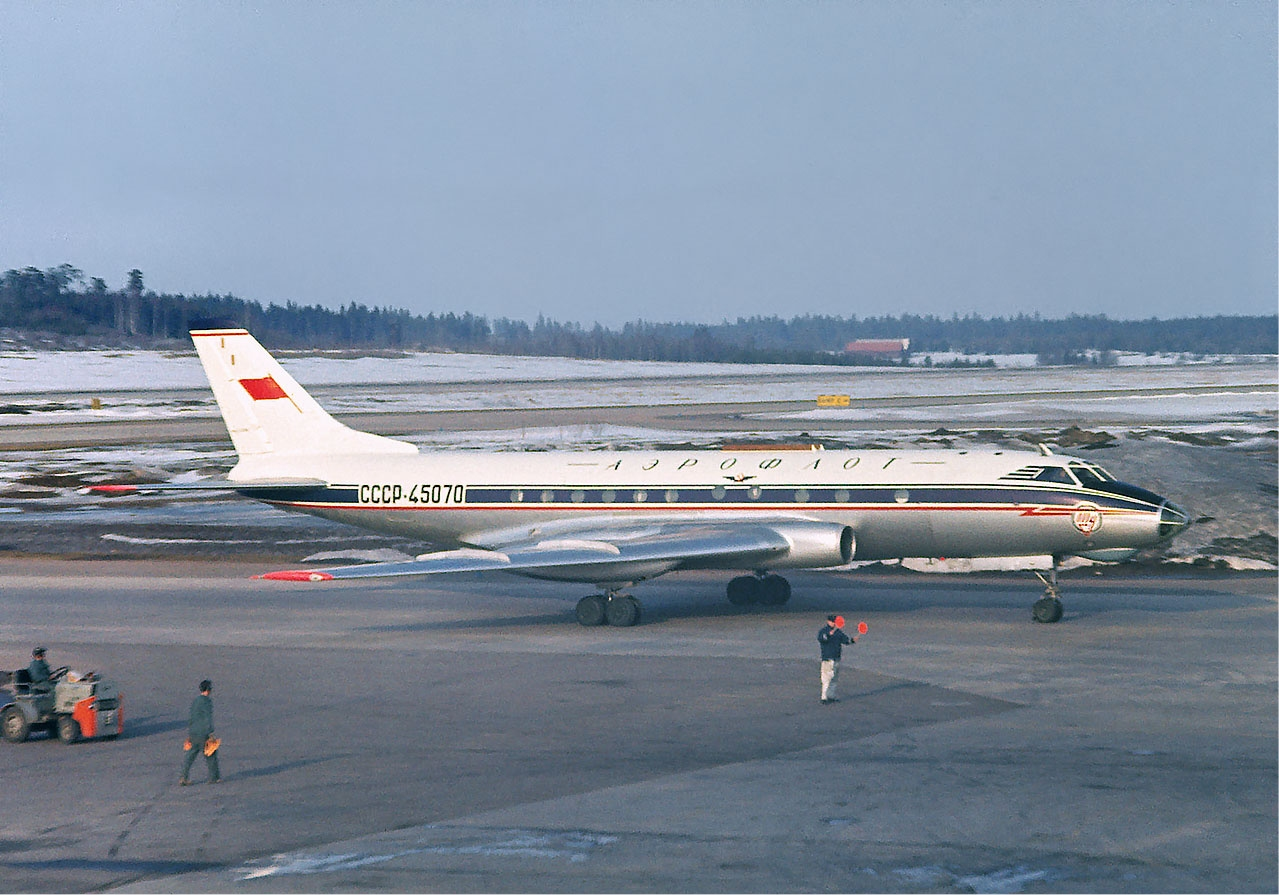
- Aeroflot Tu-124 at Arlanda Airport C. 1966

General information
- Type: Short-range jetliner
- Designer: Tupolev
- Built by: Kharkiv State Aircraft Manufacturing Company
- Status: Retired
- Primary users: Aeroflot ČSA; Interflug; Iraqi Airways
- Number built: 164

History
- Manufactured: 1960–1965
- Introduction date: 2 October 1962
- First flight: 29 March 1960
- Retired: 1980 Aeroflot, 1990 Iraqi Airways, 1992 (military service)
- Developed from: Tupolev Tu-104
- Developed into: Tupolev Tu-134

The Tupolev Tu-124 (NATO reporting name: Cookpot) is a 56-passenger short-range twin-jet airliner built in the Soviet Union. It was the Soviet Union's first operational airliner powered by turbofan engines.

== Design and development ==
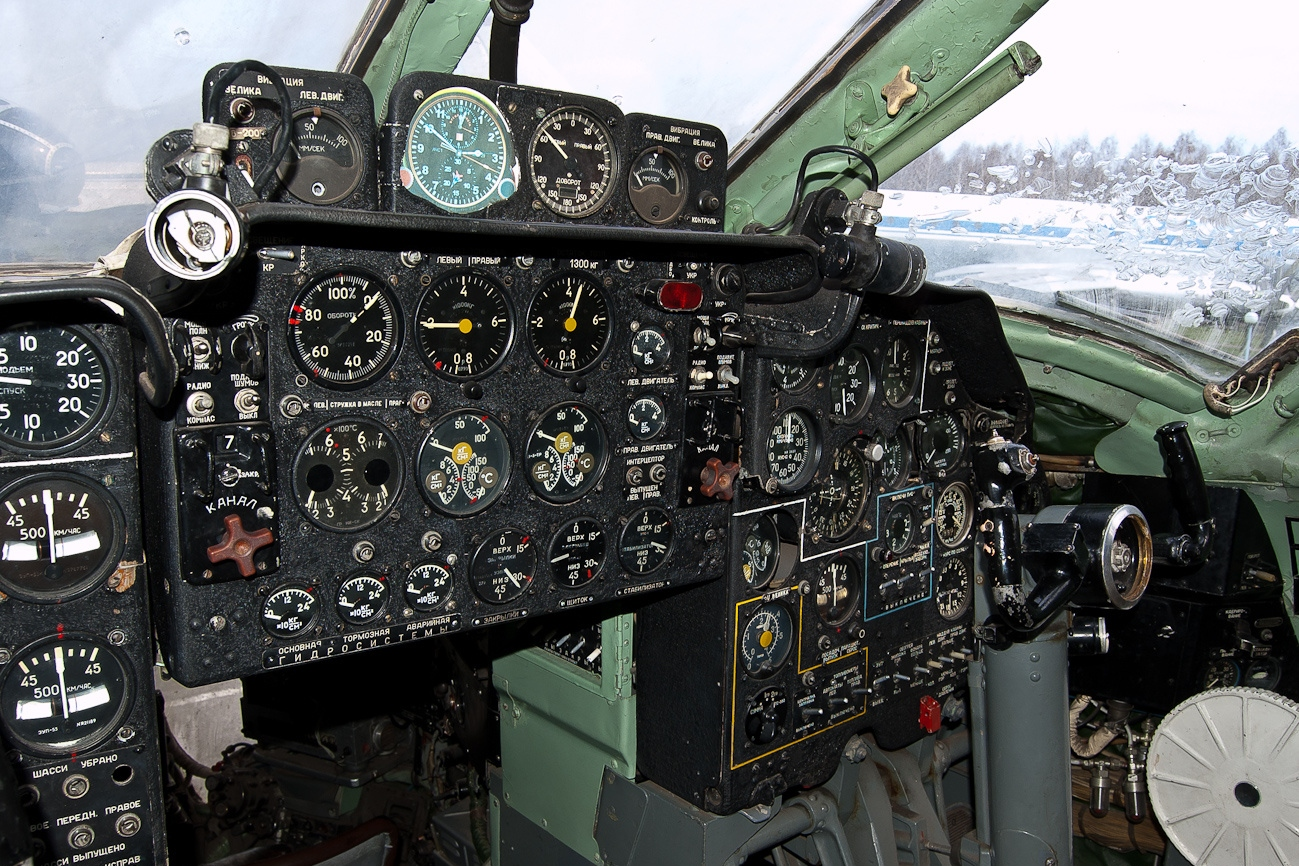
Tupolev Tu-124Sh cockpit.

Developed from the medium-range Tupolev Tu-104 jetliner, the Tu-124 was meant to meet Aeroflot's requirement for a regional airliner/jetliner to replace the Ilyushin Il-14 on domestic routes. Resembling a 75% scaled-down Tu-104, the two were hard to tell apart at a distance but it was not a complete copy of the Tu-104. The Tu-124 had a number of refinements, including double-slotted flaps, a large center-section airbrake and automatic spoilers. Unlike the Tu-104, the wing trailing edge inboard of the undercarriage was unswept.

The Tu-124 had a drogue parachute similar to those on military jets like the Sukhoi Su-7, Chengdu J-10, Avro Vulcan, and Lockheed Martin SR-71 to be used in an emergency landing or landing on a slippery surface and had low pressure tires for operation from unpaved airfields. As on the Tu-104 the engines were installed in the wing roots, but the turbofan engines used less fuel. The installation of the engines close to the fuselage allowed vibrations to be more readily transmitted to the cabin, which reduced passenger comfort, and also reduced the fatigue life of the wing assembly.

The standard seating of the basic version was 44 seats. The first of two prototype, SSSR-45000 (C/N 0350101) made its first flight from Zhukovsky airfield on 24 March 1960. The second prototype, SSSR-45001 (C/N 0350102), followed in June 1960. Two other airframes served as a static test cells. Testing was successful, and the aircraft entered production at Factory 135 at Kharkiv, Ukraine, replacing the Tu-104 in production. Deliveries to Aeroflot began in August 1962, with the type operating its first scheduled passenger service, between Moscow and Tallinn in Estonia, on 2 October 1962.

== Operational history ==
Aeroflot was impressed with the flight performance of the Tu-124 and used it on domestic routes from the end of 1962.

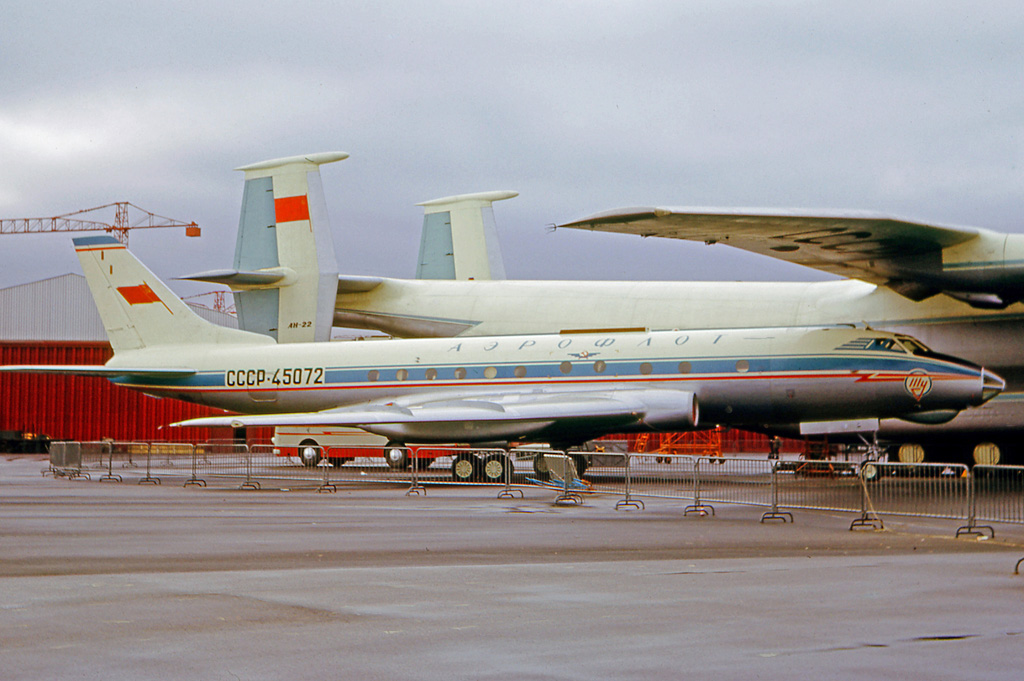
Aeroflot Tupolev Tu-124V displayed at the Paris Air Show, 1965

The improved Tu-124V, which could seat 56 passengers instead of the 44 of the original model, and which had increased range and maximum takeoff weight, came into service in 1964. An Aeroflot Tu-124V was exhibited at the 1965 Paris Air Show. Despite the aircraft's low purchase price (stated as $1.45 million in 1965) and low operating costs, few were exported, with Československé Státní Aerolinie (ČSA) and the East German airline Interflug being the only airlines other than Aeroflot that bought the Tu-124 new, although ČSA sold its surviving Tu-124s to Iraqi Airways for use on VIP flights in 1973. Interflug used its three Tu-124s as an alternative to the Ilyushin Il-62, when the Il-62s were grounded due to mechanical issues. All three were sold back to the Soviet Union in 1975.

Three airframes were completed in 1966 in a VIP configuration, and designated Tu-124K. However, Aeroflot never placed them into service, and they were purchased by the Indian Air Force.

A number were also sold to military users, including the Soviet Air Force, which used them as navigational trainers, and to the Chinese Air Force.

A total of 164 Tu-124s were built. Issues with the safety of the Tu-104 affected the fate of the Tu-124, although the reliability of the Tu-124 was slightly better. Production ended in 1965 and Aeroflot decommissioned its last twelve Tu-124s on 21 January 1980. The Tu-124 continued in operation for some years with the Soviet Air Force and in Iraq, but all aircraft were withdrawn before and in 1990, the ones owned by Iraq military and Iraqi Airways were destroyed in early 1990s during the Gulf War.

Several Tu-124s have been preserved. One is in the museum of the Kharkiv State Aircraft Manufacturing Company (formerly the Tu-124 manufacturer Factory 135), another is in the China Aviation Museum in Beijing, another at the Central Air Force Museum at Monino outside Moscow. A Tu-124K is on display at New Delhi Airport and next to the State Museum at Lucknow Zoo.

== Variants ==
Tu-124
Original production variant with 44 seats and 34,500 kg TOW. Almost all converted to 56-seat version.
Tu-124B
Three prototypes with D-20P-125 engines, built in 1963
Tu-124K/Tu-124K2
VIP configuration operated by the militaries of Iraq and China, and by the Indian Air Force
Tu-124LL
Avionic testbed version.
Tu-124Sh-1
Long-range bomber navigator trainer.
Tu-124Sh-2
Tactical bomber navigator trainer.
Tu-124TS
Military troop transport/casualty evacuation version.
Tu-124V
Version with 56 seats and 38,000 kg TOW.
Tu-124VE
Export version of Tu-124V, differing mainly in cabin trim.
Tu-127
Proposed military transport version, not built.
Tu-124A
Despite bearing this designation, this aircraft (CCCP-45075) was the prototype Tu-134, with engines located at the rear, and totally revised wings and T-tail. Preserved at Moscow-Novogireyevo.

== Former operators ==
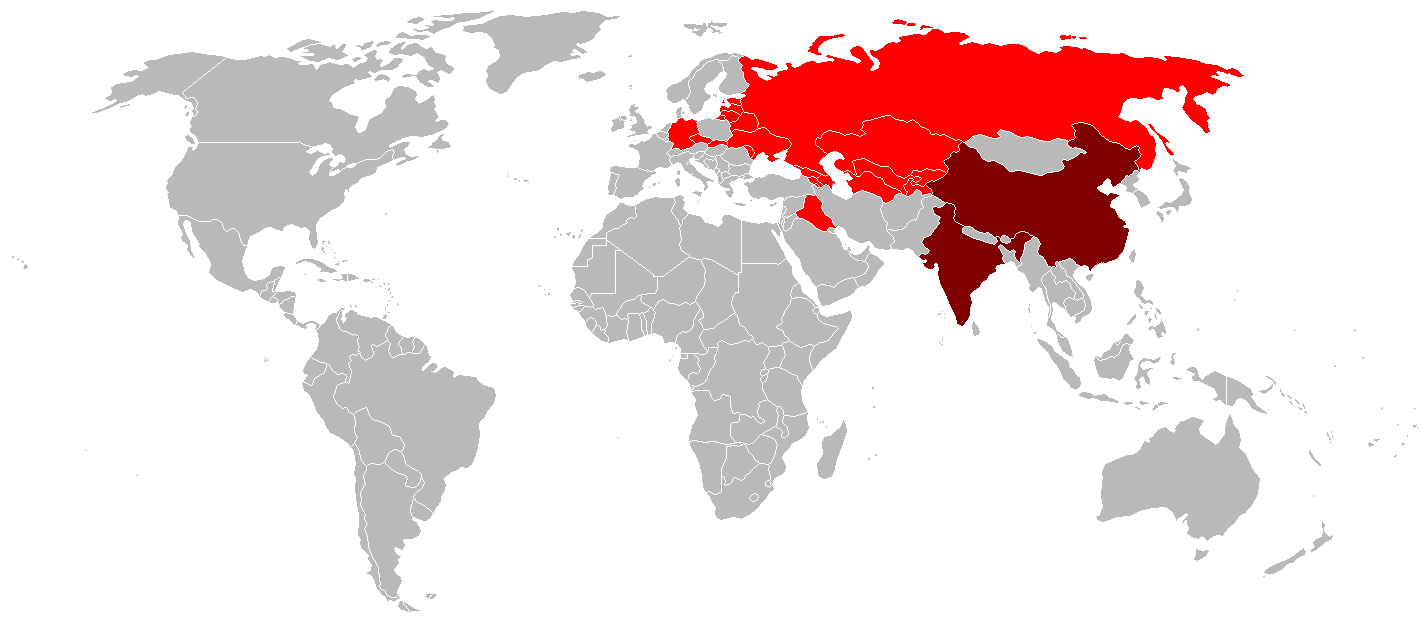
Tu-124 former operators (countries with only former military operators in dark red)

=== Former civil operators ===
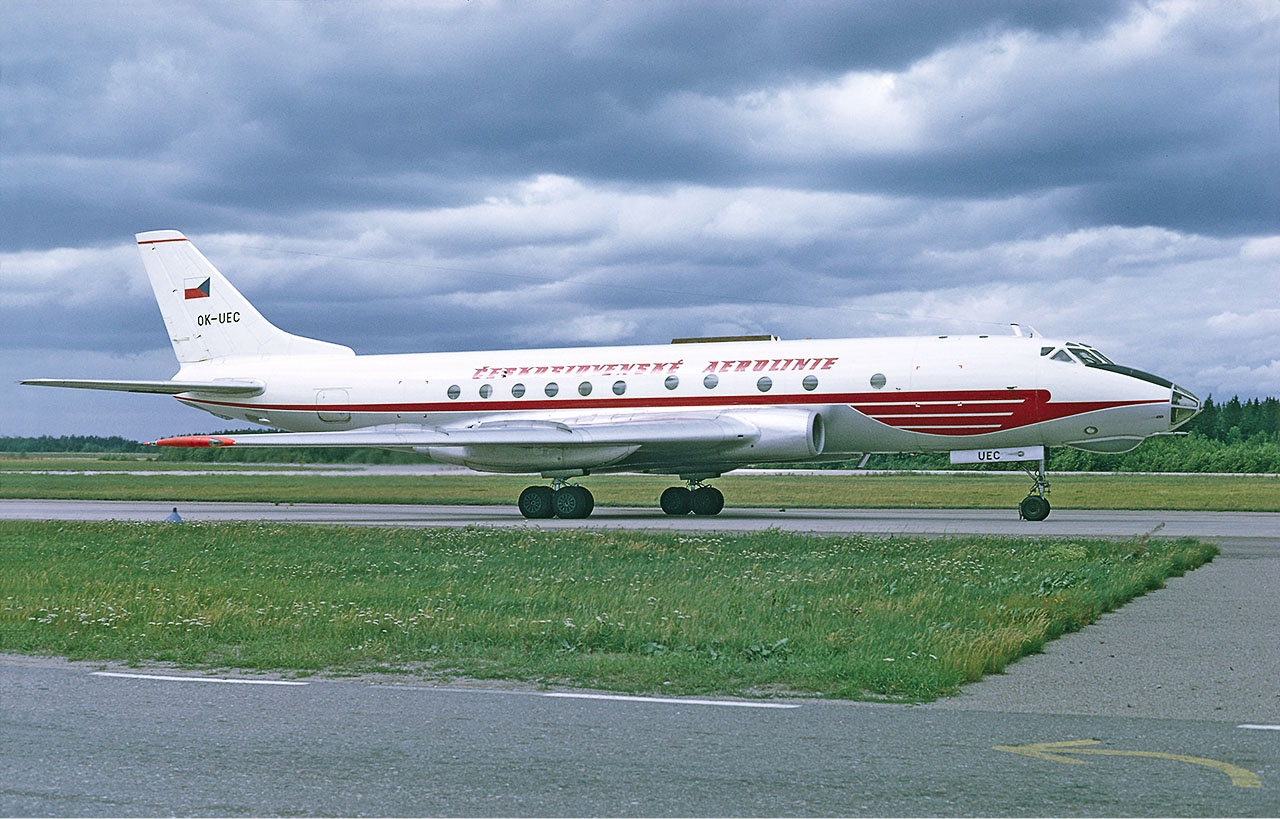
ČSA Tu 124V, OK-UEC, at Stockholm-Arlanda (ARN) 1970

Czechoslovakia

- ČSA Three Tu-124V (OK-TEA, -TEB, -UEC)

East Germany

- Interflug Three (DM-SDA, -SDB, plus ?) (Interflug colours but operated on behalf of the East German Air Force)

Iraq

- Iraqi Airways Two Tu-124V (YI-AEL, -AEY)

Soviet Union

- Aeroflot

=== Former military operators ===
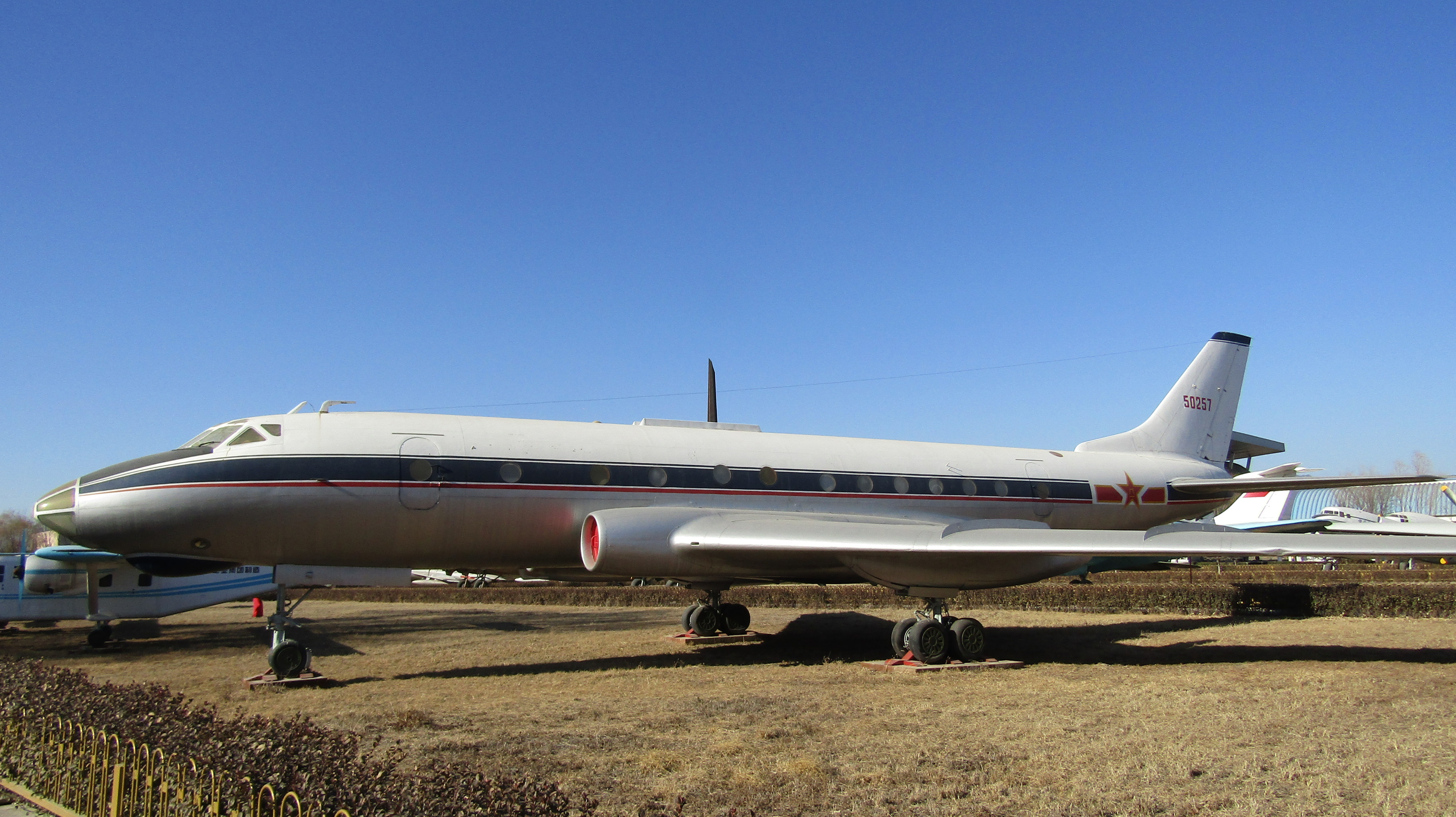
Tupolev Tu-124V at China Aviation Museum, Beijing

China

- People's Liberation Army Air Force

Czechoslovakia

- Czechoslovak Air Force

East Germany

- East German Air Force

India

- Indian Air Force (three Tu-124K VIP variants)

Iraq

- Iraqi Air Force

Soviet Union

- Soviet Air Force

== Accidents and incidents ==
A total of fifteen Tu-124s were written off in crashes during the type's operational career; another two aircraft of Iraqi Airways were destroyed on the ground during the Gulf War.

=== 1960s ===
21 August 1963
Aeroflot Flight 366, a Tu-124 (CCCP-45021), ditched in the Neva River in Leningrad (now Saint Petersburg) after both engines failed due to fuel exhaustion while the crew was preoccupied with landing gear problems; all 52 on board survived.

8 March 1965
Aeroflot Flight 513, a Tu-124 (CCCP-45028), stalled and crashed shortly after takeoff from Kuybyshev Airport, killing 30 of 39 on board.

11 November 1965
Aeroflot Flight 99, a Tu-124V (CCCP-45086), crashed on the frozen Lake Kilpyavr after the pilot mistook lights near Murmansk Airport for the runway threshold lights, killing 32 of 64 on board.

13 June 1966
An Aeroflot Tu-124 (CCCP-45017) overran a wet runway on landing at Minsk-1 International Airport and was written off; no casualties.

27 July 1966
Aeroflot Flight 67, a Tu-124V (CCCP-45038), went into a dive over Zaporizhzhia Oblast after flying into a storm at 7,200 m (23,622 ft). The crew were able to regain control at 2,800 m (9,200 ft) and landed safely at Simferopol, but one passenger died (of 90 on board) and several more were injured during the incident. The aircraft was repaired and returned to service, but was lost in the crash of Aeroflot Flight 5484 in 1979.

7 March 1968
Aeroflot Flight 3153, a Tu-124 (CCCP-45019), crashed on takeoff from Volgograd Airport after the crew accidentally activated the spoilers, killing a crew member; all 44 passengers survived. The spoiler switch had been poorly placed on the control column, allowing the pilot to hit it by accident.

=== 1970s ===
29 January 1970
Aeroflot Flight 145, a Tu-124V (CCCP-45083), struck a hillside while on approach to Kilpyavr Airport, Murmansk; of the 38 on board, five died on impact and another six died in the freezing temperatures while waiting for rescue.

18 August 1970
CSA Flight 744, a Tu-124V (OK-TEB), landed wheels-up at Kloten Airport after the pilot, preoccupied with a cabin pressurization problem, failed to hear the command to lower the landing gear; all 20 on board survived. The gear warning system alarm had been turned off.

2 September 1970
Aeroflot Flight 3630, a Tu-124 (CCCP-45012), crashed near Dnipropetrovsk (now Dnipro) following an unexplained loss of control, killing all 37 on board.

9 July 1973
Aeroflot Flight 5385, a Tu-124V (CCCP-45062), suffered an uncontained failure of the right engine shortly after takeoff from Kuybyshev Airport. Debris from the engine penetrated the fuselage, killing two passengers and injuring another four. The crew began an emergency descent and the engine was shut down. Panicking passengers moved to the front of the cabin, causing the center of gravity to move forward, but flight attendants were able to get the passengers seated and the aircraft was able to land safely at Kuybyshev. The aircraft was repaired and returned to service.

20 November 1973
An Aeroflot Tu-124V (CCCP-45031) overran a snow-covered runway on landing at Kazan Airport; no casualties.

16 December 1973
Aeroflot Flight 2022, a Tu-124V (CCCP-45061), went into a spiraling dive at 8,000 metres (26,000 ft) while descending for Moscow due to a short circuit in the elevator trim system. Although the crew were able to pull out and regain control at around 2,000 metres (6,600 ft), control was lost again due to a failed gyro and spatial disorientation and the aircraft crashed near Karacharovo, killing all 51 on board.

23 December 1973
Aeroflot Flight 5398, a Tu-124V (CCCP-45044), crashed near Vynnyky when a defective turbine blade in the no. 1 engine failed, resulting in violent vibration of the affected engine. The vibrations caused the fuel line to break. The resulting in-flight fire caused a loss of control resulting in the plane's crash and loss of all 17 on board.

3 January 1976
Aeroflot Flight 2003, a Tu-124V (CCCP-45037), crashed shortly after takeoff from Vnukovo Airport due to a loss of control following instrument failure after entering clouds, killing all 61 on board; one person on the ground also died when the aircraft struck several homes

5 November 1977
Indian Air Force Tu-124K V643, named Pushpak Rath (Floral Chariot), crashed in a paddy field near Jorhat after descending too low during the second attempt to land, killing five crew; Prime Minister Morarji Desai is among the survivors.

1977
Soviet Air Force Tu-124Sh 53 red landed wheels-up at Luhansk Airport after the pilot forgot to lower the landing gear; no casualties.

29 August 1979
Aeroflot Flight 5484, a Tu-124V (CCCP-45038), went into a spin, broke apart in mid-air, and crashed near Kirsanov after a flap was accidentally extended, killing all 63 on board. This crash is the deadliest involving the Tu-124, and Aeroflot retired it afterwards.

=== 1990s ===
February 1991
Two Iraqi Airways Tu-124Vs (YI-AEY and YI-AEL) were destroyed on the ground at Saddam International Airport by US or allied bombs during the Gulf War.

== Aircraft on display ==
=== China ===
- Tu-124, registration 50256, operated by the PLAAF, is preserved and on display at the Chinese Aviation Museum in Datangshan, Beijing.
- Tu-124, registration 50257, operated by the PLAAF, is also preserved and on display alongside 50256 at the Chinese Aviation Museum in Datangshan, Beijing.

=== India ===
- Tu-124K, registration V642 "Rajdoot", is on display at the Indian Air Force Museum, Palam in New Delhi. This aircraft historically served as a VIP transport for the President of India.
- Tu-124K, registration V644, formerly operated by the Indian Air Force, is preserved as a public exhibit at the Lucknow Zoo in Lucknow.

=== Russia ===
- Tu-124, registration CCCP-45025, is preserved as a static exhibit at the Central Air Force Museum in Monino, near Moscow.
- Tu-124V, registration CCCP-45052, is on display at the Ulyanovsk Museum of Civil Aviation.
- Tu-124, registration CCCP-45086, is preserved as a prominent square monument in Kimry, Tver Oblast.

=== Ukraine ===
- Tu-124, registration CCCP-45079, is on display at the Ukraine State Aviation Museum in Kyiv.

== Specifications (Tu-124V) ==
Data from Soviet Transport Aircraft since 1945

General characteristics

- Crew: 3
- Capacity: 56 passengers
- Length: 30.58 m (100 ft 4 in)
- Wingspan: 25.55 m (83 ft 10 in)
- Height: 8.08 m (26 ft 6 in)
- Wing area: 119.48 m^{2} (1,286.1 sq ft)
- Empty weight: 22,900 kg (50,486 lb)
- Max takeoff weight: 37,500 kg (82,673 lb)
- Powerplant: 2 × Soloviev D-20P turbofan engines, 53.1 kN (11,900 lbf) thrust each

Performance

- Maximum speed: 970 km/h (600 mph, 520 kn)
- Cruise speed: 800–870 km/h (500–540 mph, 430–470 kn)
- Range: 2,100 km (1,300 mi, 1,100 nmi) with maximum fuel and 3,000 kg (6,600 lb) payload
- Service ceiling: 11,700 m (38,400 ft)
- Rate of climb: 12 m/s (2,400 ft/min)

== See also ==
Related development

- Tupolev Tu-104
- Tupolev Tu-110
- Tupolev Tu-134
- Tupolev Tu-107

Aircraft of comparable role, configuration, and era

- BAC-111
- Sud Aviation Caravelle

Related lists

- List of civil aircraft
- List of jet airliners
