= Flight 99 =

Flight 99 may refer to:

- Aeroflot Flight 99, crashed on 11 November 1965
- Wien Air Alaska Flight 99, crashed on 30 August 1975
