= Rzhaksa =

Rzhaksa Ржакса
- Urban-type settlement
- Interactive map of Rzhaksa
- Location of Rzhaksa Rzhaksa (Tambov Oblast)
- Coordinates: 52.1351°N 42.0267°E
- Country: Russia
- Federal subject: Tambov Oblast
- Administrative district: Rzhaksinsky District

Population (2010 Census)
  - Total: 5,196
  - Estimate (2021): 4,480 (−13.8%)
- Time zone: UTC+3 (MSK)
- Postal code: 393520
- OKTMO ID: 68630151051

Rzhaksa (Russian: Ржакса) is an urban locality (an urban-type settlement) in Rzhaksinsky District of Tambov Oblast, Russia. Population: 5,196 (2010 census); 5,864 (2002 census); 6,164 (1989 Soviet census).
