= List of the busiest airports in the former Soviet Union =

This is a list of the busiest airports in the post-Soviet states (handling more than 1,000,000 passengers per year), ranked by total passengers per year, including both terminal and transit passengers. Data is from provisional sources.

The tables also show the percentage change in total passengers for each airport over the last year. Data is sourced individually for each airport and normally originates from national aviation authority statistics, or those of the airport operator.

== 2025 statistics ==
| Rank 2025 | Country | Airport | IATA | City | Passengers 2025 | Rank change | Change 2024–2025 |
|---|---|---|---|---|---|---|---|
| 1 | Russia | Alexander S. Pushkin Sheremetyevo International Airport | SVO | Moscow | 43,400,000 | Steady | ▼0.7% |
| 2 | Russia | Pulkovo Airport | LED | Saint Petersburg | 20,700,000 | Steady | ▼1.0% |
| 3 | Russia | Vnukovo Andrei Tupolev International Airport | VKO | Moscow | 16,300,000 | Steady | ▲1.9% |
| 4 | Russia | Moscow Domodedovo Airport | DME | Moscow | 13,860,000 | Steady | ▼11.2% |
| 5 | Russia | Adler-Sochi International Airport | AER | Sochi | 12,500,000 | Steady | ▼8.9% |
| 6 | Kazakhstan | Almaty International Airport | ALA | Almaty | 11,930,941 | Steady | ▲4.4% |
| 7 | Uzbekistan | Islam Karimov Tashkent International Airport | TAS | Tashkent | 9,986,445 | ▲1 | ▲14.2% |
| 8 | Russia | Tolmachevo Airport | OVB | Novosibirsk | 9,680,000 | ▼1 | ▲4.1% |
| 9 | Kazakhstan | Nursultan Nazarbayev International Airport | NQZ | Astana | 9,200,000 | Steady | ▲10.6% |
| 10 | Russia | Koltsovo Airport | SVX | Yekaterinburg | 8,385,000 | Steady | ▲4.2% |
| 11 | Azerbaijan | Heydar Aliyev International Airport | GYD | Baku | 7,640,000 | Steady | ▲1.4% |
| 12 | Latvia | Riga International Airport | RIX | Riga | 7,111,000 | Steady | ▼0.1% |
| 13 | Moldova | Chișinău Eugen Doga International Airport | RMO | Chișinău | 6,080,431 | ▲8 | ▲46.8% |
| 14 | Armenia | Zvartnots International Airport | EVN | Yerevan | 5,615,789 | Steady | ▲7.0% |
| 15 | Georgia | Shota Rustaveli Tbilisi International Airport | TBS | Tbilisi | 5,400,000 | ▲3 | ▲13.7% |
| 16 | Russia | Ğabdulla Tuqay Kazan International Airport | KZN | Kazan | 5,380,000 | ▼3 | ▲0.2% |
| 17 | Lithuania | Vilnius Čiurlionis International Airport | VNO | Vilnius | 5,113,452 | Steady | ▲6.4% |
| 18 | Russia | Khrabrovo Airport | KGD | Kaliningrad | 5,000,000 | ▼2 | ▲3.8% |
| 19 | Russia | Mostay Kərim Ufa International Airport | UFA | Ufa | 4,929,715 | Steady | ▲4.9% |
| 20 | Russia | Mineralnye Vody Airport | MRV | Mineralnye Vody | 4,600,000 | ▼5 | ▼5.3% |
| 21 | Russia | Krasnoyarsk International Airport | KJA | Krasnoyarsk | 4,263,566 | ▼1 | ▼0.4% |
| 22 | Russia | International Airport Irkutsk | IKT | Irkutsk | 4,048,738 | Steady | ▲2.7% |
| 23 | Russia | Kurumoch International Airport | KUF | Samara | 3,570,000 | Steady | Steady |
| 24 | Estonia | Lennart Meri Airport | TLL | Tallinn | 3,488,094 | Steady | ▼0.1% |
| 25 | Kyrgyzstan | Manas International Airport | BSZ | Bishkek | TBU | Steady | TBU |
| 26 | Russia | Knevichi Airport | VVO | Vladivostok | 3,260,000 | Steady | ▲9.7% |
| 27 | Belarus | Minsk National Airport | MSQ | Minsk | 3,025,000 | ▲1 | ▲8.4% |
| 28 | Russia | Uytash Airport | MCX | Makhachkala | 3,000,000 | ▼1 | ▲3.5% |
| 29 | Russia | Roshchino Airport | TJM | Tyumen | 2,764,000 | Steady | ▼0.4% |
| 30 | Russia | Khabarovsk Novy Airport | KHV | Khabarovsk | 2,578,000 | Steady | ▲5.4% |
| 31 | Kazakhstan | Şymkent Airport | CIT | Şymkent | 2,500,000 | ▲3 | ▲13.6% |
| 32 | Kyrgyzstan | Osh Airport | OSS | Osh | TBU | ▼1 | TBU |
| 33 | Russia | Farman Salmanov Surgut Airport | SGC | Surgut | 2,214,034 | Steady | ▼0.3% |
| 34 | Russia | Balandino Airport | CEK | Chelyabinsk | 2,160,421 | ▲1 | ▲2.3% |
| 35 | Tajikistan | Dushanbe International Airport | DYU | Dushanbe | 2,160,248 | ▼3 | ▼7.6% |
| 36 | Russia | Bolshoye Savino Airport | PEE | Perm | 2,004,861 | Steady | ▲1.7% |
| 37 | Georgia | David the Builder Kutaisi International Airport | KUT | Kutaisi | 1,824,720 | ▲1 | ▲5.9% |
| 38 | Kazakhstan | Aqtau Airport | SCO | Aqtau | 1,700,000 | ▲1 | Steady |
| 39 | Russia | Omsk Central Airport | OMS | Omsk | 1,630,000 | ▼2 | ▼5.6% |
| 40 | Lithuania | Kaunas Airport | KUN | Kaunas | 1,599,253 | ▲5 | ▲12.0% |
| 41 | Russia | Gumrak Airport | VOG | Volgograd | 1,540,000 | ▼1 | ▼8.4% |
| 42 | Uzbekistan | Samarqand International Airport | SKD | Samarqand | 1,521,158 | ▲4 | ▲10.1% |
| 43 | Russia | Khomutovo Airport | UUS | Yuzhno-Sakhalinsk | 1,460,000 | ▲1 | Steady |
| 44 | Russia | Zhukovsky International Airport | ZIA | Moscow | 1,426,000 | ▼3 | ▼4.4% |
| 45 | Russia | Emperor Nicholas II Murmansk Airport | MMK | Murmansk | 1,410,000 | ▼2 | ▼3.9% |
| 46 | Kazakhstan | Atyrau Airport | GUW | Atyrau | 1,400,000 | New entry | TBU |
| 46 | Russia | Strigino Airport | GOJ | Nizhny Novgorod | 1,400,000 | ▼4 | ▼4.8% |
| 47 | Georgia | Alexander Kartveli Batumi International Airport | BUS | Batumi | 1,230,200 | New entry | ▲29.0% |
| 48 | Russia | Saratov Gagarin Airport | GSV | Saratov | 1,064,000 | ▼1 | ▼7.5% |
| 49 | Russia | Ignatyevo Airport | BQS | Blagoveshchensk | 1,051,000 | New entry | ▲13.3% |
| 50 | Russia | Platon Oyunsky Yakutsk International Airport | YKS | Yakutsk | 1,040,000 | ▼2 | ▼4.1% |
| 51 | Russia | Novy Urengoy Airport | NUX | Novy Urengoy | 1,036,000 | ▼2 | ▼4.3% |
| 52 | Russia | Talagi Airport | ARH | Arkhangelsk | TBU | ▼2 | TBU |
| 53 | Kazakhstan | Aliya Moldagulova International Airport | AKX | Aqtöbe | >1,000,000 | New entry | ▲TBU |

== 2024 statistics ==
| Rank 2024 | Country | Airport | IATA | City | Passengers 2024 | Change 2023–2024 |
|---|---|---|---|---|---|---|
| 1 | Russia | Alexander S. Pushkin Sheremetyevo International Airport | SVO | Moscow | 43,711,773 | ▲19.4% |
| 2 | Russia | Pulkovo Airport | LED | Saint Petersburg | 20,900,000 | ▲2.5% |
| 3 | Russia | Vnukovo Andrei Tupolev International Airport | VKO | Moscow | 16,000,000 | ▲10.3% |
| 4 | Russia | Moscow Domodedovo Airport | DME | Moscow | 15,600,000 | ▼21.6% |
| 5 | Russia | Adler-Sochi International Airport | AER | Sochi | 13,725,979 | ▼1.3% |
| 6 | Kazakhstan | Almaty International Airport | ALA | Almaty | 11,426,650 | ▲19.7% |
| 7 | Russia | Tolmachevo Airport | OVB | Novosibirsk | 9,299,000 | ▲2.3% |
| 8 | Uzbekistan | Islam Karimov Tashkent International Airport | TAS | Tashkent | 8,716,526 | ▲28.2% |
| 9 | Kazakhstan | Nursultan Nazarbayev International Airport | NQZ | Astana | 8,315,108 | ▲10.7% |
| 10 | Russia | Koltsovo Airport | SVX | Yekaterinburg | 8,047,000 | ▲9.0% |
| 11 | Azerbaijan | Heydar Aliyev International Airport | GYD | Baku | 7,537,000 | ▲28.8% |
| 12 | Latvia | Riga International Airport | RIX | Riga | 7,120,000 | ▲7.4% |
| 13 | Russia | Ğabdulla Tuqay Kazan International Airport | KZN | Kazan | 5,369,000 | ▲3.9% |
| 14 | Armenia | Zvartnots International Airport | EVN | Yerevan | 5,249,689 | ▼1.5% |
| 15 | Russia | Mineralnye Vody Airport | MRV | Mineralnye Vody | 4,860,000 | ▲1.5% |
| 16 | Russia | Khrabrovo Airport | KGD | Kaliningrad | 4,814,395 | ▲11.9% |
| 17 | Lithuania | Vilnius Airport | VNO | Vilnius | 4,803,725 | ▲8.9% |
| 18 | Georgia | Shota Rustaveli Tbilisi International Airport | TBS | Tbilisi | 4,750,830 | ▲28.6% |
| 19 | Russia | Mostay Kərim Ufa International Airport | UFA | Ufa | 4,700,000 | ▼0.9% |
| 20 | Russia | Krasnoyarsk International Airport | KJA | Krasnoyarsk | 4,282,721 | ▲13.5% |
| 21 | Moldova | Chișinău International Airport | RMO | Chișinău | 4,142,418 | ▲46.0% |
| 22 | Russia | International Airport Irkutsk | IKT | Irkutsk | 3,900,000 | ▲3.0% |
| 23 | Russia | Kurumoch International Airport | KUF | Samara | 3,570,000 | ▲0.8% |
| 24 | Estonia | Lennart Meri Airport | TLL | Tallinn | 3,491,677 | ▲17.9% |
| 25 | Kyrgyzstan | Manas International Airport | FRU | Bishkek | 3,300,000 | ▲~4.5% |
| 26 | Russia | Knevichi Airport | VVO | Vladivostok | 2,971,000 | ▲17.8% |
| 27 | Russia | Uytash Airport | MCX | Makhachkala | 2,898,731 | ▲3.5% |
| 28 | Belarus | Minsk National Airport | MSQ | Minsk | 2,800,000 | ▲12.1% |
| 29 | Russia | Roshchino Airport | TJM | Tyumen | 2,776,417 | ▲6.7% |
| 30 | Russia | Khabarovsk Novy Airport | KHV | Khabarovsk | 2,446,000 | ▲8.0% |
| 31 | Kyrgyzstan | Osh Airport | OSS | Osh | 2,400,000 | ▲~4.5% |
| 32 | Tajikistan | Dushanbe International Airport | DYU | Dushanbe | 2,338,000 | ▲5.0% |
| 33 | Russia | Farman Salmanov Surgut Airport | SGC | Surgut | 2,220,534 | ▲3.4% |
| 34 | Kazakhstan | Şymkent Airport | CIT | Şymkent | 2,200,000 | ▲18.0% |
| 35 | Russia | Balandino Airport | CEK | Chelyabinsk | 2,100,000 | ▼2.9% |
| 36 | Russia | Bolshoye Savino Airport | PEE | Perm | 1,971,626 | ▼1.1% |
| 37 | Russia | Omsk Central Airport | OMS | Omsk | 1,726,029 | ▲2.7% |
| 38 | Georgia | David the Builder Kutaisi International Airport | KUT | Kutaisi | 1,722,809 | ▲3.1% |
| 39 | Kazakhstan | Aqtau Airport | SCO | Aqtau | 1,700,000 | ▲8.7% |
| 40 | Russia | Gumrak Airport | VOG | Volgograd | 1,682,000 | ▲7.0% |
| 41 | Russia | Zhukovsky International Airport | ZIA | Moscow | 1,491,000 | ▲2.8% |
| 42 | Russia | Strigino Airport | GOJ | Nizhny Novgorod | 1,470,000 | ▲5.0% |
| 43 | Russia | Emperor Nicholas II Murmansk Airport | MMK | Murmansk | 1,466,649 | ▲2.1% |
| 44 | Russia | Khomutovo Airport | UUS | Yuzhno-Sakhalinsk | 1,448,527 | ▲8.7% |
| 45 | Lithuania | Kaunas Airport | KUN | Kaunas | 1,427,284 | ▲9.8% |
| 46 | Uzbekistan | Samarqand International Airport | SKD | Samarqand | 1,381,320 | ▲36.6% |
| 47 | Russia | Saratov Gagarin Airport | GSV | Saratov | 1,150,000 | ▲7.6% |
| 48 | Russia | Platon Oyunsky Yakutsk International Airport | YKS | Yakutsk | 1,084,000 | TBU |
| 49 | Russia | Novy Urengoy Airport | NUX | Novy Urengoy | 1,076,000 | ▲2.0% |
| 50 | Russia | Talagi Airport | ARH | Arkhangelsk | 1,058,000 | ▲146.0% |
| 51 | Russia | Orenburg Tsentralny Airport | REN | Orenburg | 1,005,000 | ▼3.6% |

== 2023 statistics ==
| Rank 2023 | Country | Airport | IATA | City | Passengers 2023 | Change 2022–2023 |
|---|---|---|---|---|---|---|
| 1 | Russia | Alexander S. Pushkin Sheremetyevo International Airport | SVO | Moscow | 36,600,000 | ▲28.7% |
| 2 | Russia | Pulkovo Airport | LED | Saint Petersburg | 20,400,000 | ▲12.1% |
| 3 | Russia | Moscow Domodedovo Airport | DME | Moscow | 19,900,000 | ▼6.1% |
| 4 | Russia | Vnukovo Andrei Tupolev International Airport | VKO | Moscow | 14,500,000 | ▼11.6% |
| 5 | Russia | Adler-Sochi International Airport | AER | Sochi | 13,912,820 | ▲6.9% |
| 6 | Kazakhstan | Almaty International Airport | ALA | Almaty | 9,547,136 | ▲32.0% |
| 7 | Russia | Tolmachevo Airport | OVB | Novosibirsk | 9,093,000 | ▲19.9% |
| 8 | Kazakhstan | Nursultan Nazarbayev International Airport | NQZ | Astana | 7,546,391 | ▲25.0% |
| 9 | Russia | Koltsovo Airport | SVX | Yekaterinburg | 7,380,000 | ▲26.4% |
| 10 | Uzbekistan | Islam Karimov Tashkent International Airport | TAS | Tashkent | 6,800,000 | ▲39.0% |
| 11 | Latvia | Riga International Airport | RIX | Riga | 6,630,891 | ▲23.2% |
| 12 | Azerbaijan | Heydar Aliyev International Airport | GYD | Baku | 5,850,000 | ▲33.0% |
| 13 | Armenia | Zvartnots International Airport | EVN | Yerevan | 5,330,308 | ▲46% |
| 14 | Russia | Ğabdulla Tuqay Kazan International Airport | KZN | Kazan | 5,168,000 | ▲28.6% |
| 15 | Russia | Mostay Kərim Ufa International Airport | UFA | Ufa | 4,794,786 | ▲17.3% |
| 16 | Russia | Mineralnye Vody Airport | MRV | Mineralnye Vody | 4,790,000 | ▲17.4% |
| 17 | Lithuania | Vilnius Airport | VNO | Vilnius | 4,410,000 | ▲12.6% |
| 18 | Russia | Khrabrovo Airport | KGD | Kaliningrad | 4,300,625 | ▲14.9% |
| 19 | Russia | International Airport Irkutsk | IKT | Irkutsk | 3,787,498 | ▲43.9% |
| 20 | Russia | Krasnoyarsk International Airport | KJA | Krasnoyarsk | 3,774,449 | ▲22.1% |
| 21 | Georgia | Shota Rustaveli Tbilisi International Airport | TBS | Tbilisi | 3,694,205 | ▲23.6% |
| 22 | Russia | Kurumoch International Airport | KUF | Samara | 3,540,000 | ▲22.1% |
| 23 | Kyrgyzstan | Manas International Airport | FRU | Bishkek | ~3,150,000 | ▲~16.8% |
| 24 | Estonia | Lennart Meri Airport | TLL | Tallinn | 2,961,569 | ▲7.8% |
| 25 | Moldova | Chișinău International Airport | KIV | Chișinău | 2,960,194 | ▲28.2% |
| 26 | Russia | Uytash Airport | MCX | Makhachkala | 2,800,000 | ▲11.6% |
| 27 | Russia | Roshchino Airport | TJM | Tyumen | 2,601,128 | ▲11.1% |
| 28 | Russia | Knevichi Airport | VVO | Vladivostok | 2,593,000 | ▲22.4% |
| 29 | Belarus | Minsk National Airport | MSQ | Minsk | 2,497,631 | ▲20.7% |
| 30 | Kyrgyzstan | Osh Airport | OSS | Osh | ~2,300,000 | ▼~1.7% |
| 31 | Russia | Khabarovsk Novy Airport | KHV | Khabarovsk | 2,264,000 | ▲16.6% |
| 32 | Tajikistan | Dushanbe International Airport | DUS | Dushanbe | 2,227,386 | ▲31.0% |
| 33 | Russia | Balandino Airport | CEK | Chelyabinsk | 2,162,423 | ▲12.5% |
| 34 | Russia | Farman Salmanov Surgut Airport | SGC | Surgut | 2,147,448 | ▲19.2% |
| 35 | Russia | Bolshoye Savino Airport | PEE | Perm | 1,992,852 | ▲14.3% |
| 36 | Russia | Omsk Central Airport | OMS | Omsk | 1,680,206 | ▲5.9% |
| 37 | Georgia | David the Builder Kutaisi International Airport | KUT | Kutaisi | 1,671,016 | ▲103.2% |
| 38 | Russia | Gumrak Airport | VOG | Volgograd | 1,571,246 | ▲13.0% |
| 39 | Kazakhstan | Aqtau Airport | SCO | Aqtau | 1,563,444 | ▲19.9% |
| 40 | Kazakhstan | Şymkent Airport | OSS | Şymkent | >1,500,000 | TBU |
| 41 | Russia | Zhukovsky International Airport | ZIA | Moscow | 1,450,000 | ▲4.3% |
| 42 | Russia | Emperor Nicholas II Murmansk Airport | MMK | Murmansk | 1,435,945 | ▲10.5% |
| 43 | Russia | Strigino Airport | GOJ | Nizhny Novgorod | 1,400,000 | ▲16.7% |
| 44 | Russia | Khomutovo Airport | UUS | Yuzhno-Sakhalinsk | 1,333,115 | ▲5.2% |
| 45 | Lithuania | Kaunas Airport | KUN | Kaunas | 1,300,000 | ▲12.2% |
| 46 | Russia | Saratov Gagarin Airport | GSV | Saratov | 1,069,000 | ▲9.0% |
| 47 | Russia | Novy Urengoy Airport | NUX | Novy Urengoy | 1,055,000 | ▲2.0% |
| 48 | Russia | Orenburg Tsentralny Airport | REN | Orenburg | 1,042,000 | ▲112.7% |
| 49 | Tajikistan | Khujand Airport | LBD | Khujand | 1,025,537 | ▲9.9% |
| 50 | Uzbekistan | Samarqand International Airport | SKD | Samarqand | 1,010,938 | ▲104.9% |
| 51 | Russia | Kadyrov Grozny International Airport | GRV | Grozny | 1,005,806 | ▲29.3% |

== 2022 statistics ==
| Rank 2022 | Country | Airport | IATA | City | Passengers 2022 | Change 2021–2022 |
|---|---|---|---|---|---|---|
| 1 | Russia | Alexander S. Pushkin Sheremetyevo International Airport | SVO | Moscow | 28,400,000 | ▼7.0% |
| 2 | Russia | Moscow Domodedovo Airport | DME | Moscow | 21,200,000 | ▼15.0% |
| 3 | Russia | Pulkovo Airport | LED | Saint Petersburg | 18,200,000 | ▲0.9% |
| 4 | Russia | Vnukovo Andrei Tupolev International Airport | VKO | Moscow | 16,400,000 | ▼8.9% |
| 5 | Russia | Adler-Sochi International Airport | AER | Sochi | 13,011,000 | ▲17.4% |
| 6 | Russia | Tolmachevo Airport | OVB | Novosibirsk | 7,585,000 | ▲12.2% |
| 7 | Kazakhstan | Almaty International Airport | ALA | Almaty | 7,230,156 | ▲18.5% |
| 8 | Kazakhstan | Nursultan Nazarbayev International Airport | NQZ | Astana | 6,001,471 | ▲24.0% |
| 9 | Russia | Koltsovo Airport | SVX | Yekaterinburg | 5,840,000 | ▼3.6% |
| 10 | Latvia | Riga International Airport | RIX | Riga | 5,380,779 | ▲129.0% |
| 11 | Uzbekistan | Islam Karimov Tashkent International Airport | TAS | Tashkent | 5,000,000 | ▲46.0% |
| 12 | Azerbaijan | Heydar Aliyev International Airport | GYD | Baku | 4,400,000 | |
| 13 | Russia | Ufa International Airport | UFA | Ufa | 4,089,111 | ▲2.2% |
| 14 | Russia | Mineralnye Vody Airport | MRV | Mineralnye Vody | 4,080,000 | ▲27.3% |
| 15 | Russia | Kazan International Airport | KZN | Kazan | 4,018,000 | ▲3.7% |
| 16 | Lithuania | Vilnius Airport | VNO | Vilnius | 3,915,960 | ▲106.0% |
| 17 | Russia | Khrabrovo Airport | KGD | Kaliningrad | 3,742,387 | ▼4,3% |
| 18 | Armenia | Zvartnots International Airport | EVN | Yerevan | 3,649,764 | ▲60.2% |
| 19 | Russia | Krasnoyarsk International Airport | KJA | Krasnoyarsk | 3,092,342 | ▲13.2% |
| 20 | Georgia | Shota Rustaveli Tbilisi International Airport | TBS | Tbilisi | 2,988,785 | ▲78.0% |
| 21 | Kazakhstan | Şymkent International Airport | CIT | Şymkent | 2,976,880 | ▲39.2% |
| 22 | Russia | Kurumoch Airport | KUF | Samara | ~2,900,000 | ▼3.0% |
| 23 | Estonia | Lennart Meri Airport | TLL | Tallinn | 2,748,255 | ▲111.0% |
| 24 | Kyrgyzstan | Manas International Airport | FRU | Bishkek | 2,695,883 | ▲26.8% |
| 25 | Russia | International Airport Irkutsk | IKT | Irkutsk | 2,632,834 | ▲27.0% |
| 26 | Russia | Uytash Airport | MCX | Makhachkala | 2,509,238 | ▲23.6% |
| 27 | Russia | Roshchino Airport | TYU | Tyumen | 2,341,727 | ▲4.4% |
| 28 | Kyrgyzstan | Osh Airport | OSS | Osh | 2,339,503 | ▲33.6% |
| 29 | Moldova | Chișinău International Airport | KIV | Chișinău | 2,308,316 | ▲25.1% |
| 30 | Russia | Knevichi Airport | VVO | Vladivostok | 2,118,000 | ▲16.7% |
| 31 | Belarus | Minsk National Airport | MSQ | Minsk | 2,068,000 | ▼20.0% |
| 32 | Russia | Khabarovsk Novy Airport | KHV | Khabarovsk | 1,941,500 | ▲9.0% |
| 33 | Russia | Balandino Airport | CEK | Chelyabinsk | 1,922,000 | ▲5.2% |
| 34 | Russia | Farman Salmanov Surgut Airport | SGC | Surgut | 1,900,000 | ▲4.5% |
| 35 | Russia | Bolshoye Savino Airport | PEE | Perm | 1,743,696 | ▼9.6% |
| 36 | Tajikistan | Dushanbe International Airport | DYU | Dushanbe | 1,700,000 | |
| 37 | Russia | Omsk Tsentralny Airport | OMS | Omsk | 1,585,994 | ▲6.3% |
| 38 | Russia | Gumrak Airport | VOG | Volgograd | 1,390,000 | ▼3,5% |
| 39 | Russia | Zhukovsky International Airport | ZIA | Moscow | 1,390,000 | ▲~50% |
| 40 | Kazakhstan | Aqtau Airport | SCO | Aqtau | 1,303,560 | ▲17,4% |
| 41 | Russia | Murmansk Airport | MMK | Murmansk | 1,299,084 | ▼4.2% |
| 42 | Russia | Khomutovo Airport | UUS | Yuzhno-Sakhalinsk | 1,266,000 | ▲18.4% |
| 43 | Russia | Strigino Airport | GOJ | Nizhny Novgorod | 1,200,000 | ▼19.0% |
| 44 | Lithuania | Kaunas International Airport | KUN | Kaunas | 1,158,304 | ▲237.6% |
| 45 | Russia | Novy Urengoy Airport | NUX | Novy Urengoy | 1,034,640 | ▲7.9% |
| 46 | Russia | Talagi Airport | ARH | Arkhangelsk | 1,000,000 | ▼6.0% |

== 2021 statistics ==
| Rank 2021 | Country | Airport | IATA | City | Passengers 2021 | Change 2020–2021 |
|---|---|---|---|---|---|---|
| 1 | Russia | Alexander S. Pushkin Sheremetyevo International Airport | SVO | Moscow | 30,623,796 | ▲56.5% |
| 2 | Russia | Moscow Domodedovo Airport | DME | Moscow | 25,065,087 | ▲52.9% |
| 3 | Russia | Pulkovo Airport | LED | Saint Petersburg | 18,043,464 | ▲64.9% |
| 4 | Russia | Vnukovo Andrei Tupolev International Airport | VKO | Moscow | 17,999,084 | ▲43.2% |
| 5 | Russia | Adler-Sochi International Airport | AER | Sochi | 11,076,621 | ▲70.3% |
| 6 | Ukraine | Boryspil International Airport | KBP | Kyiv | 9,433,000 | ▲82.9% |
| 7 | Ukraine/Russia^{*} | Simferopol International Airport | SIP | Simferopol | 6,830,000 | ▲46.7% |
| 8 | Russia | Tolmachevo Airport | OVB | Novosibirsk | 6,662,128 | ▲47.0% |
| 9 | Kazakhstan | Almaty International Airport | ALA | Almaty | 6,103,657 | ▲66.3% |
| 10 | Russia | Koltsovo Airport | SVX | Yekaterinburg | 5,973,142 | ▲71.2% |
| 11 | Uzbekistan | Islam Karimov Tashkent International Airport | TAS | Tashkent | 5,400,000 | |
| 12 | Russia | Pashkovsky Airport | KRR | Krasnodar | 5,022,243 | ▲63.2% |
| 13 | Kazakhstan | Nursultan Nazarbayev International Airport | TSE | Nur-Sultan | 4,837,464 | ▲58% |
| 14 | Russia | Mineralnye Vody Airport | MRV | Mineralnye Vody | >4,000,000 | ▲78.2% |
| 15 | Russia | Ufa International Airport | UFA | Ufa | 3,987,137 | ▲68.3% |
| 16 | Russia | Khrabrovo Airport | KGD | Kaliningrad | 3,910,846 | ▲84.7% |
| 17 | Russia | Kazan International Airport | KZN | Kazan | 3,700,000 | ▲70.4% |
| 18 | Russia | Kurumoch Airport | KUF | Samara | 2,993,142 | ▲78.7% |
| 19 | Russia | Vityazevo Airport | AAQ | Anapa | 2,931,057 | ▲61.7% |
| 20 | Russia | Platov Airport | ROV | Rostov-on-Don | 2,897,938 | ▲39.0% |
| 21 | Russia | Krasnoyarsk International Airport | KJA | Krasnoyarsk | 2,694,817 | ▲62.7% |
| 22 | Belarus | Minsk National Airport | MSQ | Minsk | ~2,500,000 | ▲31.5% |
| 23 | Latvia | Riga International Airport | RIX | Riga | 2,353,064 | ▲17.0% |
| 24 | Russia | Roshchino Airport | TYU | Tyumen | 2,242,326 | ▲63.0% |
| 25 | Kazakhstan | Şymkent International Airport | CIT | Şymkent | 2,138,100 | ▲ |
| 26 | Kyrgyzstan | Manas International Airport | FRU | Bishkek | 2,126,354 | ▲ |
| 27 | Russia | International Airport Irkutsk | IKT | Irkutsk | 2,077,769 | ▲54.5% |
| 28 | Russia | Uytash Airport | MCX | Makhachkala | 2,030,044 | ▲45.1% |
| 29 | Russia | Bolshoye Savino Airport | PEE | Perm | 1,928,000 | ▲72.5% |
| 30 | Lithuania | Vilnius Airport | VNO | Vilnius | 1,898,817 | ▲44.7% |
| 31 | Moldova | Chișinău International Airport | KIV | Chișinău | 1,844,450 | |
| 32 | Russia | Farman Salmanov Surgut Airport | SGC | Surgut | 1,843,224 | ▲42.1% |
| 33 | Ukraine | Lviv Danylo Halytskyi International Airport | LWO | Lviv | 1,834,100 | ▲108.8% |
| 34 | Russia | Balandino Airport | CEK | Chelyabinsk | 1,813,869 | ▲57.1% |
| 35 | Russia | Knevichi Airport | VVO | Vladivostok | 1,813,658 | ▲40.3% |
| 36 | Armenia | Zvartnots International Airport | EVN | Yerevan | | |
| 37 | Azerbaijan | Heydar Aliyev International Airport | GYD | Baku | | |
| 38 | Russia | Khabarovsk Novy Airport | KHV | Khabarovsk | 1,780,605 | ▲40.2% |
| 39 | Kyrgyzstan | Osh Airport | OSS | Osh | 1,750,857 | ▲ |
| 40 | Georgia | Shota Rustaveli Tbilisi International Airport | TBS | Tbilisi | 1,683,696 | ▲185.3% |
| 41 | Russia | Omsk Tsentralny Airport | OMS | Omsk | 1,492,032 | ▲59.8% |
| 42 | Russia | Strigino Airport | GOJ | Nizhny Novgorod | 1,452,301 | ▲152.9% |
| 43 | Russia | Gumrak Airport | VOG | Volgograd | 1,440,697 | ▲84.5% |
| 44 | Ukraine | Igor Sikorsky Kyiv International Airport (Zhuliany) | IEV | Kyiv | 1,418,153 | ▲101.3% |
| 45 | Russia | Murmansk Airport | MMK | Murmansk | 1,355,612 | ▲32.0% |
| 46 | Ukraine | Odesa International Airport | ODS | Odesa | 1,328,000 | ▲ |
| 47 | Kazakhstan | Aqtau Airport | SCO | Aqtau | 1,303,560 | ▲17,4% |
| 48 | Estonia | Lennart Meri Airport | TLL | Tallinn | 1,301,066 | ▲50.7% |
| 49 | Tajikistan | Dushanbe International Airport | DYU | Dushanbe | | |
| 50 | Ukraine | Kharkiv Airport | HRK | Kharkiv | 1,159,889 | ▲56.8% |
| 51 | Russia | Khomutovo Airport | UUS | Yuzhno-Sakhalinsk | 1,069,627 | ▲53.4% |
| 52 | Russia | Talagi Airport | ARH | Arkhangelsk | 1,064,215 | ▲65.4% |
| 53 | Russia | Gelendzhik Airport | GDZ | Gelendzhik | 1,040,167 | ▲116% |

^*The political status of Crimea is the subject of a political and territorial dispute between Russia and Ukraine. The Crimean Peninsula was annexed by the Russian Federation in February–March 2014. In 2016, UN General Assembly reaffirmed non-recognition of the annexation and condemned "the temporary occupation of part of the territory of Ukraine—the Autonomous Republic of Crimea and the city of Sevastopol".

== 2020 statistics ==
| Rank 2020 | Country | Airport | IATA | City | Passengers 2020 | Change 2019–2020 |
|---|---|---|---|---|---|---|
| 1 | Russia | Alexander S. Pushkin Sheremetyevo International Airport | SVO | Moscow | 19,566,402 | ▼60.8% |
| 2 | Russia | Moscow Domodedovo Airport | DME | Moscow | 16,389,427 | ▼42.0% |
| 3 | Russia | Vnukovo Andrei Tupolev International Airport | VKO | Moscow | 12,565,241 | ▼47.7% |
| 4 | Russia | Pulkovo Airport | LED | Saint Petersburg | 10,944,421 | ▼44.1% |
| 5 | Russia | Adler-Sochi International Airport | AER | Sochi | 6,505,301 | ▼3.8% |
| 6 | Ukraine | Boryspil International Airport | KBP | Kyiv | 5,157,848 | ▼66.2% |
| 7 | Ukraine/Russia^{*} | Simferopol International Airport | SIP | Simferopol | 4,630,000 | ▼9.9% |
| 8 | Russia | Tolmachevo Airport | OVB | Novosibirsk | 4,531,157 | ▼32.8% |
| 9 | Kazakhstan | Almaty International Airport | ALA | Almaty | 3,669,668 | ▼42.9% |
| 10 | Russia | Koltsovo Airport | SVX | Yekaterinburg | 3,498,286 | ▼45.2% |
| 11 | Russia | Pashkovsky Airport | KRR | Krasnodar | 3,076,447 | ▼33.7% |
| 12 | Kazakhstan | Nursultan Nazarbayev International Airport | NQZ | Nur-Sultan | 3,059,714 | ▼40.0% |
| 13 | Russia | Ufa International Airport | UFA | Ufa | 2,368,689 | ▼33.7% |
| 14 | Russia | Kazan International Airport | KZN | Kazan | 2,171,603 | ▼37.4% |
| 15 | Russia | Khrabrovo Airport | KGD | Kaliningrad | 2,117,931 | ▼10.6% |
| 16 | Russia | Platov Airport | ROV | Rostov-on-Don | 2,086,000 | ▼31.8% |
| 17 | Latvia | Riga International Airport | RIX | Riga | 2,011,155 | ▼74.2% |
| 18 | Belarus | Minsk National Airport | MSQ | Minsk | 1,939,192 | ▼62.0% |
| 19 | Uzbekistan | Islam Karimov Tashkent International Airport | TAS | Tashkent | TBU | TBU |
| 20 | Russia | Vityazevo Airport | AAQ | Anapa | 1,813,128 | ▲10.4% |
| 21 | Russia | Mineralnye Vody Airport | MRV | Mineralnye Vody | 1,797,989 | ▼28.1% |
| 22 | Russia | Kurumoch Airport | KUF | Samara | 1,675,034 | ▼44.4% |
| 23 | Russia | Krasnoyarsk International Airport | KJA | Krasnoyarsk | 1,656,190 | ▼35.5% |
| 24 | Russia | Uytash Airport | MCX | Makhachkala | 1,399,489 | ▼6.7% |
| 25 | Russia | Roshchino Airport | TYU | Tyumen | 1,374,620 | ▼32.9% |
| 26 | Russia | International Airport Irkutsk | IKT | Irkutsk | 1,344,484 | ▼45.4% |
| 27 | Lithuania | Vilnius Airport | VNO | Vilnius | 1,312,468 | ▼73.8% |
| 28 | Russia | Farman Salmanov Surgut Airport | SGC | Surgut | 1,297,578 | ▼27.9% |
| 29 | Russia | Knevichi Airport | VVO | Vladivostok | 1,292,560 | ▼58.0% |
| 30 | Russia | Khabarovsk Novy Airport | KHV | Khabarovsk | 1,270,203 | ▼42.1% |
| 31 | Russia | Balandino Airport | CEK | Chelyabinsk | 1,154,750 | ▼32.6% |
| 32 | Russia | Bolshoye Savino Airport | PEE | Perm | 1,118,143 | ▼32.1% |
| 33 | Azerbaijan | Heydar Aliyev International Airport | GYD | Baku | 1,030,700 | ▼78.2% |

== 2019 statistics ==
| Rank 2019 | Country | Airport | IATA | City | Passengers 2019 | Change 2018–2019 |
|---|---|---|---|---|---|---|
| 1 | Russia | Alexander S. Pushkin Sheremetyevo International Airport | SVO | Moscow | 49,933,000 | ▲8.9% |
| 2 | Russia | Moscow Domodedovo Airport | DME | Moscow | 28,252,337 | ▼4.1% |
| 3 | Russia | Vnukovo Andrei Tupolev International Airport | VKO | Moscow | 24,011,150 | ▲12.0% |
| 4 | Russia | Pulkovo Airport | LED | Saint Petersburg | 19,581,262 | ▲8.1% |
| 5 | Ukraine | Boryspil International Airport | KBP | Kyiv | 15,260,281 | ▲21.1% |
| 6 | Latvia | Riga International Airport | RIX | Riga | 7,798,382 | ▲10.5% |
| 7 | Russia | Adler-Sochi International Airport | AER | Sochi | 6,760,000 | ▲6.5% |
| 8 | Russia | Tolmachevo Airport | OVB | Novosibirsk | 6,747,151 | ▲14.2% |
| 9 | Kazakhstan | Almaty International Airport | ALA | Almaty | 6,422,721 | ▲12.9% |
| 10 | Russia | Koltsovo Airport | SVX | Yekaterinburg | 6,363,000 | ▲4.3% |
| 11 | Ukraine/Russia^{*} | Simferopol International Airport | SIP | Simferopol | 5,140,000 | ▼0.1% |
| 12 | Belarus | Minsk National Airport | MSQ | Minsk | 5,101,766 | ▲12.5% |
| 13 | Kazakhstan | Nursultan Nazarbayev International Airport | TSE | Nur-Sultan | 5,099,391 | ▲12.2% |
| 14 | Lithuania | Vilnius Airport | VNO | Vilnius | 5,004,922 | ▲1.7% |
| 15 | Azerbaijan | Heydar Aliyev International Airport | GYD | Baku | 4,730,000 | ▲6.8% |
| 16 | Russia | Pashkovsky Airport | KRR | Krasnodar | 4,642,791 | ▲11.3% |
| 17 | Uzbekistan | Islam Karimov Tashkent International Airport | TAS | Tashkent | 4,430,000 | ▲22.2% |
| 18 | Georgia | Shota Rustaveli Tbilisi International Airport | TBS | Tbilisi | 3,692,202 | ▼3.1% |
| 19 | Russia | Ufa International Airport | UFA | Ufa | 3,570,000 | ▲10.7% |
| 20 | Russia | Kazan International Airport | KZN | Kazan | 3,470,742 | ▲10.5% |
| 21 | Estonia | Lennart Meri Airport | TLL | Tallinn | 3,267,909 | ▲8.7% |
| 22 | Russia | Knevichi Airport | VVO | Vladivostok | 3,080,000 | ▲16.9% |
| 23 | Russia | Platov Airport | ROV | Rostov-on-Don | 3,060,000 | ▼5.4% |
| 24 | Armenia | Zvartnots International Airport | EVN | Yerevan | 3,048,859 | ▲13.3% |
| 25 | Russia | Kurumoch Airport | KUF | Samara | 3,010,000 | ▼2.4% |
| 26 | Moldova | Chișinău International Airport | KIV | Chișinău | 2,995,530 | ▲5.9% |
| 27 | Ukraine | Igor Sikorsky Kyiv International Airport (Zhuliany) | IEV | Kyiv | 2,617,900 | ▼6.9% |
| 28 | Russia | Krasnoyarsk International Airport | KJA | Krasnoyarsk | 2,568,541 | ▼0.7% |
| 29 | Turkmenistan | Saparmurat Türkmenbaşy International Airport | ASB | Aşgabat | | |
| 30 | Russia | Mineralnye Vody Airport | MRV | Mineralnye Vody | 2,500,000 | ▲4.2% |
| 31 | Russia | International Airport Irkutsk | IKT | Irkutsk | 2,463,384 | ▲11.3% |
| 32 | Russia | Khrabrovo Airport | KGD | Kaliningrad | 2,369,860 | ▲10.3% |
| 33 | Ukraine | Lviv Danylo Halytskyi International Airport | LWO | Lviv | 2,217,400 | ▲38.8% |
| 34 | Russia | Khabarovsk Novy Airport | KHV | Khabarovsk | 2,195,000 | ▲2.5% |
| 35 | Kyrgyzstan | Manas International Airport | FRU | Bishkek | 2,167,759 | ▲4.0% |
| 36 | Russia | Roshchino Airport | TYU | Tyumen | 2,047,500 | ▲3.1% |
| 37 | Russia | Surgut International Airport | SGC | Surgut | 1,800,000 | ▲2.4% |
| 38 | Russia | Balandino Airport | CEK | Chelyabinsk | 1,713,532 | ▲3.4% |
| 39 | Ukraine | Odesa International Airport | ODS | Odesa | 1,694,022 | ▲17.1% |
| 40 | Russia | Bolshoye Savino Airport | PEE | Perm | 1,647,005 | ▲7.9% |
| 41 | Russia | Vityazevo Airport | AAQ | Anapa | 1,642,000 | ▲10.4% |
| 42 | Russia | Uytash Airport | MCX | Makhachkala | 1,500,690 | ▲15.9% |
| 43 | Kyrgyzstan | Osh Airport | OSS | Osh | 1,499,561 | ▲6.8% |
| 44 | Tajikistan | Dushanbe International Airport | DYU | Dushanbe | 1,422,204 | ▲6.1% |
| 45 | Russia | Omsk Tsentralny Airport | OMS | Omsk | 1,382,000 | ▲26.9% |
| 46 | Ukraine | Kharkiv Airport | HRK | Kharkiv | 1,340,000 | ▲40.0% |
| 47 | Russia | Zhukovsky International Airport | ZIA | Moscow | 1,320,000 | ▲13.6% |
| 48 | Russia | Gumrak Airport | VOG | Volgograd | 1,214,675 | ▲5.6% |
| 49 | Russia | Khomutovo Airport | UUS | Yuzhno-Sakhalinsk | 1,209,161 | ▲13.5% |
| 50 | Lithuania | Kaunas International Airport | KUN | Kaunas | 1,160,672 | ▲14.8% |
| 51 | Russia | Strigino Airport | GOJ | Nizhny Novgorod | 1,129,000 | ▼1.0% |
| 52 | Russia | Murmansk Airport | MMK | Murmansk | 1,030,000 | ▲9.8% |
| 53 | Kazakhstan | Aqtau Airport | SCO | Aqtau | 1,029,685 | ▲0.7% |

^*The political status of Crimea is the subject of a political and territorial dispute between Russia and Ukraine. The Crimean Peninsula was annexed by the Russian Federation in February–March 2014. In 2016, UN General Assembly reaffirmed non-recognition of the annexation and condemned "the temporary occupation of part of the territory of Ukraine—the Autonomous Republic of Crimea and the city of Sevastopol".

== 2018 statistics ==
| Rank 2018 | Country | Airport | IATA | City | Passengers 2018 | Change 2017–2018 |
|---|---|---|---|---|---|---|
| 1 | Russia | Sheremetyevo International Airport | SVO | Moscow | 45,385,254 | ▲14.3% |
| 2 | Russia | Moscow Domodedovo Airport | DME | Moscow | 29,449,537 | ▼4.1% |
| 3 | Russia | Vnukovo International Airport | VKO | Moscow | 21,536,387 | ▲18.4% |
| 4 | Russia | Pulkovo Airport | LED | Saint Petersburg | 18,122,286 | ▲12.4% |
| 5 | Ukraine | Boryspil International Airport | KBP | Kyiv | 12,603,271 | ▲19.4% |
| 6 | Latvia | Riga International Airport | RIX | Riga | 7,056,099 | ▲15.7% |
| 7 | Russia | Adler-Sochi International Airport | AER | Sochi | 6,347,066 | ▲6.4% |
| 8 | Russia | Koltsovo Airport | SVX | Yekaterinburg | 6,103,049 | ▲13.0% |
| 9 | Russia | Tolmachevo Airport | OVB | Novosibirsk | 5,909,078 | ▲18.0% |
| 10 | Kazakhstan | Almaty International Airport | ALA | Almaty | 5,686,926 | ▲0.8% |
| 11 | Ukraine/Russia^{*} | Simferopol International Airport | SIP | Simferopol | 5,146,095 | ▲0.3% |
| 12 | Lithuania | Vilnius Airport | VNO | Vilnius | 4,922,949 | ▲30.9% |
| 13 | Kazakhstan | Nursultan Nazarbayev International Airport | TSE | Nur-Sultan | 4,545,370 | ▲5.9% |
| 14 | Belarus | Minsk National Airport | MSQ | Minsk | 4,536,618 | ▲10.3% |
| 15 | Azerbaijan | Heydar Aliyev International Airport | GYD | Baku | 4,430,000 | ▲9.1% |
| 16 | Russia | Pashkovsky Airport | KRR | Krasnodar | 4,172,550 | ▲19.3% |
| 17 | Georgia | Shota Rustaveli Tbilisi International Airport | TBS | Tbilisi | 3,808,619 | ▲20.4% |
| 18 | Uzbekistan | Islam Karimov Tashkent International Airport | TAS | Tashkent | 3,624,000 | ▲16.4% |
| 19 | Russia | Platov Airport | ROV | Rostov-on-Don | 3,236,000 | ▲17.0% |
| 20 | Russia | Ufa International Airport | UFA | Ufa | 3,222,825 | ▲14.5% |
| 21 | Russia | Kazan International Airport | KZN | Kazan | 3,141,776 | ▲19.8% |
| 22 | Russia | Kurumoch Airport | KUF | Samara | 3,085,386 | ▲17.0% |
| 23 | Estonia | Lennart Meri Airport | TLL | Tallinn | 3,007,644 | ▲13.6% |
| 24 | Moldova | Chișinău International Airport | KIV | Chișinău | 2,828,626 | ▲3.1% |
| 25 | Ukraine | Igor Sikorsky Kyiv International Airport (Zhuliany) | IEV | Kyiv | 2,812,300 | ▲51.9% |
| 26 | Armenia | Zvartnots International Airport | EVN | Yerevan | 2,690,727 | ▲10.0% |
| 27 | Russia | Knevichi Airport | VVO | Vladivostok | 2,634,149 | ▲21.0% |
| 28 | Russia | Yemelyanovo International Airport | KJA | Krasnoyarsk | 2,586,974 | ▲12.6% |
| 29 | Turkmenistan | Saparmurat Türkmenbaşy International Airport | ASB | Aşgabat | 2,450,000 | ▲8.2% |
| 30 | Russia | Mineralnye Vody Airport | MRV | Mineralnye Vody | 2,408,000 | ▲10.5% |
| 31 | Russia | International Airport Irkutsk | IKT | Irkutsk | 2,213,098 | ▲10.1% |
| 32 | Russia | Khrabrovo Airport | KGD | Kaliningrad | 2,149,413 | ▲20.1% |
| 33 | Russia | Khabarovsk Novy Airport | KHV | Khabarovsk | 2,142,330 | ▲4.5% |
| 34 | Kyrgyzstan | Manas International Airport | FRU | Bishkek | 2,084,738 | ▼3.7% |
| 35 | Russia | Roshchino Airport | TYU | Tyumen | 1,985,749 | ▲8.4% |
| 36 | Russia | Surgut International Airport | SGC | Surgut | 1,758,310 | ▲2.0% |
| 37 | Russia | Balandino Airport | CEK | Chelyabinsk | 1,656,728 | ▲7.4% |
| 38 | Ukraine | Lviv Danylo Halytskyi International Airport | LWO | Lviv | 1,598,700 | ▲48.0% |
| 39 | Russia | Bolshoye Savino Airport | PEE | Perm | 1,526,110 | ▲13,5% |
| 40 | Russia | Vityazevo Airport | AAQ | Anapa | 1,487,382 | ▲9.0% |
| 41 | Ukraine | Odesa International Airport | ODS | Odesa | 1,446,521 | ▲17.7% |
| 42 | Kyrgyzstan | Osh Airport | OSS | Osh | 1,403,622 | ▼0.4% |
| 43 | Tajikistan | Dushanbe International Airport | DYU | Dushanbe | 1,340,692 | ▲2.8% |
| 44 | Russia | Uytash Airport | MCX | Makhachkala | 1,295,000 | ▲27.3% |
| 45 | Russia | Zhukovsky International Airport | ZIA | Moscow | 1,161,633 | ▲173.0% |
| 46 | Russia | Gumrak Airport | VOG | Volgograd | 1,149,912 | ▲13.4% |
| 47 | Russia | Strigino Airport | GOJ | Nizhny Novgorod | 1,140,340 | ▲18.0% |
| 48 | Russia | Omsk Tsentralny Airport | OMS | Omsk | 1,088,926 | ▲14.9% |
| 49 | Russia | Khomutovo Airport | UUS | Yuzhno-Sakhalinsk | 1,065,132 | ▲8.1% |
| 50 | Kazakhstan | Aqtau Airport | SCO | Aqtau | 1,023,826 | ▼4.5% |
| 51 | Lithuania | Kaunas International Airport | KUN | Kaunas | 1,011,067 | ▼14.8% |

^*The political status of Crimea is the subject of a political and territorial dispute between Russia and Ukraine. The Crimean Peninsula was annexed by the Russian Federation in February–March 2014. In 2016, UN General Assembly reaffirmed non-recognition of the annexation and condemned "the temporary occupation of part of the territory of Ukraine—the Autonomous Republic of Crimea and the city of Sevastopol".

== 2017 statistics ==
| Rank 2017 | Country | Airport | IATA | City | Passengers 2017 | Change 2016–2017 |
|---|---|---|---|---|---|---|
| 1 | Russia | Sheremetyevo International Airport | SVO | Moscow | 39,641,443 | ▲17.8% |
| 2 | Russia | Moscow Domodedovo Airport | DME | Moscow | 30,657,854 | ▲7.6% |
| 3 | Russia | Vnukovo International Airport | VKO | Moscow | 18,139,000 | ▲30.1% |
| 4 | Russia | Pulkovo Airport | LED | Saint Petersburg | 16,125,520 | ▲21.6% |
| 5 | Ukraine | Boryspil International Airport | KBP | Kyiv | 10,554,757 | ▲22.1% |
| 6 | Latvia | Riga International Airport | RIX | Riga | 6,097,765 | ▲12.9% |
| 7 | Russia | Adler-Sochi International Airport | AER | Sochi | 5,691,822 | ▲9.1% |
| 8 | Kazakhstan | Almaty International Airport | ALA | Almaty | 5,640,800 | ▲15.6% |
| 9 | Russia | Koltsovo Airport | SVX | Yekaterinburg | 5,404,000 | ▲25.7% |
| 10 | Ukraine/Russia^{*} | Simferopol International Airport | SIP | Simferopol | 5,128,738 | ▼1.4% |
| 11 | Russia | Tolmachevo Airport | OVB | Novosibirsk | 5,007,302 | ▲22.2% |
| 12 | Kazakhstan | Astana Nursultan Nazarbayev International Airport | TSE | Astana | 4,294,145 | ▲24.8% |
| 13 | Belarus | Minsk National Airport | MSQ | Minsk | 4,114,512 | ▲20.0% |
| 14 | Azerbaijan | Heydar Aliyev International Airport | GYD | Baku | 4,060,000 | ▲24.5% |
| 15 | Lithuania | Vilnius Airport | VNO | Vilnius | 3,761,001 | ▼1.4% |
| 16 | Russia | Pashkovsky Airport | KRR | Krasnodar | 3,498,126 | ▲16.5% |
| 17 | Georgia | Shota Rustaveli Tbilisi International Airport | TBS | Tbilisi | 3,164,139 | ▲40.5% |
| 18 | Uzbekistan | Islam Karimov Tashkent International Airport | TAS | Tashkent | 3,114,000 | ▲9.0% |
| 19 | Russia | Ufa International Airport | UFA | Ufa | 2,814,330 | ▲21.4% |
| 20 | Russia | Rostov-on-Don Airport + Platov Airport | ROV | Rostov-on-Don | 2,766,000 | ▲32.0% |
| 21 | Moldova | Chișinău International Airport | KIV | Chișinău | 2,744,653 | ▲24.4% |
| 22 | Russia | Kurumoch Airport | KUF | Samara | 2,649,426 | ▲26.6% |
| 23 | Estonia | Lennart Meri Airport | TLL | Tallinn | 2,648,361 | ▲12.0% |
| 24 | Russia | Kazan International Airport | KZN | Kazan | 2,623,423 | ▲37.1% |
| 25 | Armenia | Zvartnots International Airport | EVN | Yerevan | 2,448,250 | ▲16.3% |
| 26 | Russia | Yemelyanovo International Airport | KJA | Krasnoyarsk | 2,297,468 | ▲26.0% |
| 27 | Russia | Mineralnye Vody Airport | MRV | Mineralnye Vody | 2,180,178 | ▲26.6% |
| 28 | Russia | Knevichi Airport | VVO | Vladivostok | 2,179,000 | ▲17.8% |
| 29 | Kyrgyzstan | Manas International Airport | FRU | Bishkek | 2,164,858 | ▲18.0% |
| 30 | Russia | Khabarovsk Novy Airport | KHV | Khabarovsk | 2,047,000 | ▲9.7% |
| 31 | Russia | International Airport Irkutsk | IKT | Irkutsk | 2,010,000 | ▲17.6% |
| 32 | Ukraine | Igor Sikorsky Kyiv International Airport (Zhuliany) | IEV | Kyiv | 1,851,700 | ▲64.2% |
| 33 | Russia | Roshchino Airport | TYU | Tyumen | 1,831,654 | ▲19.7% |
| 34 | Russia | Khrabrovo Airport | KGD | Kaliningrad | 1,780,000 | ▲13.9% |
| 35 | Russia | Surgut International Airport | SGC | Surgut | 1,723,312 | ▲15.7% |
| 36 | Russia | Balandino Airport | CEK | Chelyabinsk | 1,517,000 | ▲23.7% |
| 37 | Turkmenistan | Saparmurat Türkmenbaşy International Airport | ASB | Aşgabat | 1,500,000(2013) | Steady |
| 38 | Kyrgyzstan | Osh Airport | OSS | Osh | 1,409,768 | ▲38.1% |
| 39 | Russia | Vityazevo Airport | AAQ | Anapa | 1,364,000 | ▼3.8% |
| 40 | Russia | Bolshoye Savino Airport | PEE | Perm | 1,338,373 | ▲19.0% |
| 41 | Tajikistan | Dushanbe International Airport | DYU | Dushanbe | 1,304,800 | ▲12.7% |
| 42 | Ukraine | Odesa International Airport | ODS | Odesa | 1,230,000 | ▲18.3% |
| 43 | Lithuania | Kaunas International Airport | KUN | Kaunas | 1,186,074 | ▲60.2% |
| 44 | Ukraine | Lviv Danylo Halytskyi International Airport | LWO | Lviv | 1,080,000 | ▲46.3% |
| 45 | Kazakhstan | Aqtau Airport | SCO | Aqtau | 1,067,900 | ▲23.3% |
| 46 | Russia | Uytash Airport | MCX | Makhachkala | 1,067,685 | ▲23.0% |
| 47 | Russia | Gumrak Airport | VOG | Volgograd | 1,013,985 | ▲24.9% |

^*The political status of Crimea is the subject of a political and territorial dispute between Russia and Ukraine.

== 2016 statistics ==
| Rank 2016 | Country | Airport | IATA | City | Passengers 2016 | Change 2015–2016 |
|---|---|---|---|---|---|---|
| 1 | Russia | Sheremetyevo International Airport | SVO | Moscow | 34,030,000 | ▲7.6% |
| 2 | Russia | Moscow Domodedovo Airport | DME | Moscow | 28,537,243 | ▼6.6% |
| 3 | Russia | Vnukovo International Airport | VKO | Moscow | 14,012,058 | ▼11.6% |
| 4 | Russia | Pulkovo Airport | LED | Saint Petersburg | 13,265,037 | ▼1.7% |
| 5 | Ukraine | Boryspil International Airport | KBP | Kyiv | 8,650,000 | ▲18.9% |
| 6 | Latvia | Riga International Airport | RIX | Riga | 5,402,545 | ▲4.6% |
| 7 | Russia | Adler-Sochi International Airport | AER | Sochi | 5,263,275 | ▲28.7% |
| 8 | Ukraine/Russia^{*} | Simferopol International Airport | SIP | Simferopol | 5,201,522 | ▲3.7% |
| 9 | Kazakhstan | Almaty International Airport | ALA | Almaty | 4,878,450 | ▼0.5% |
| 10 | Russia | Koltsovo Airport | SVX | Yekaterinburg | 4,300,732 | ▲1.2% |
| 11 | Russia | Tolmachevo Airport | OVB | Novosibirsk | 4,097,490 | ▲10.6% |
| 12 | Lithuania | Vilnius Airport | VNO | Vilnius | 3,814,001 | ▲14.3% |
| 13 | Kazakhstan | Astana Airport | TSE | Astana | 3,452,714 | ▲2.6% |
| 14 | Belarus | Minsk National Airport | MSQ | Minsk | 3,429,112 | ▲23.2% |
| 15 | Azerbaijan | Heydar Aliyev International Airport | GYD | Baku | 3,260,000 | ▲8.7% |
| 16 | Russia | Pashkovsky Airport | KRR | Krasnodar | 3,002,121 | ▼4.0% |
| 17 | Uzbekistan | Tashkent International Airport | TAS | Tashkent | 2,857,000 | ▼4.7% |
| 18 | Russia | Ufa International Airport | UFA | Ufa | 2,318,350 | ▲0.2% |
| 19 | Georgia | Shota Rustaveli Tbilisi International Airport | TBS | Tbilisi | 2,252,535 | ▲21.9% |
| 20 | Estonia | Lennart Meri Airport | TLL | Tallinn | 2,221,615 | ▲2.5% |
| 21 | Moldova | Chișinău International Airport | KIV | Chișinău | 2,206,266 | ▼1.6% |
| 22 | Armenia | Zvartnots International Airport | EVN | Yerevan | 2,105,540 | ▲12.0% |
| 23 | Russia | Rostov-on-Don Airport | ROV | Rostov-on-Don | 2,094,677 | ▲1.5% |
| 24 | Russia | Kurumoch Airport | KUF | Samara | 2,092,042 | ▼5.3% |
| 25 | Russia | Kazan International Airport | KZN | Kazan | 1,912,954 | ▲6.6% |
| 26 | Russia | Khabarovsk Novy Airport | KHV | Khabarovsk | 1,869,096 | ▲2.6% |
| 27 | Russia | Knevichi Airport | VVO | Vladivostok | 1,850,376 | ▲9.0% |
| 28 | Kyrgyzstan | Manas International Airport | FRU | Bishkek | 1,834,115 | ▲3.1% |
| 29 | Russia | Yemelyanovo International Airport | KJA | Krasnoyarsk | 1,822,825 | ▲1.0% |
| 30 | Russia | Mineralnye Vody Airport | MRV | Mineralnye Vody | 1,721,607 | ▼12.0% |
| 31 | Russia | International Airport Irkutsk | IKT | Irkutsk | 1,708,893 | ▲0.9% |
| 32 | Russia | Khrabrovo Airport | KGD | Kaliningrad | 1,570,821 | ▲1.9% |
| 33 | Russia | Roshchino Airport | TYU | Tyumen | 1,530,549 | ▲8.7% |
| 34 | Turkmenistan | Saparmurat Türkmenbaşy International Airport | ASB | Aşgabat | 1,500,000(2013) | Steady |
| 35 | Russia | Surgut International Airport | SGC | Surgut | 1,489,395 | ▲4.7% |
| 36 | Russia | Vityazevo Airport | AAQ | Anapa | 1,418,454 | ▲20.3% |
| 37 | Russia | Balandino Airport | CEK | Chelyabinsk | 1,225,902 | ▼1.1% |
| 38 | Tajikistan | Dushanbe International Airport | DYU | Dushanbe | 1,156,000 | ▲18.5% |
| 39 | Russia | Bolshoye Savino Airport | PEE | Perm | 1,131,844 | ▼12.1% |
| 40 | Ukraine | Igor Sikorsky Kyiv International Airport (Zhuliany) | IEV | Kyiv | 1,127,500 | ▲19.4% |
| 41 | Ukraine | Odesa International Airport | ODS | Odesa | 1,033,560 | ▲8.9% |
| 42 | Kyrgyzstan | Osh Airport | OSS | Osh | 1,020,572 | ▼16.2% |

^*The political status of Crimea is the subject of a political and territorial dispute between Russia and Ukraine.

== 2015 statistics ==
| Rank 2015 | Country | Airport | City | Passengers 2015 | Change 2014–2015 |
|---|---|---|---|---|---|
| 1 | Russia | Sheremetyevo International Airport | Moscow | 31,612,000 | ▲0.1% |
| 2 | Russia | Moscow Domodedovo Airport | Moscow | 30,504,000 | ▼7.7% |
| 3 | Russia | Vnukovo International Airport | Moscow | 15,815,129 | ▲24.2% |
| 4 | Russia | Pulkovo Airport | Saint Petersburg | 13,501,440 | ▼5.4% |
| 5 | Ukraine | Boryspil International Airport | Kyiv | 7,277,135 | ▲5.6% |
| 6 | Latvia | Riga International Airport | Riga | 5,162,149 | ▲7.2% |
| 7 | Ukraine/Russia^{*} | Simferopol International Airport | Simferopol | 5,017,760 | ▲79.8% |
| 8 | Kazakhstan | Almaty International Airport | Almaty | 4,905,307 | ▲6.9% |
| 9 | Russia | Koltsovo Airport | Yekaterinburg | 4,247,541 | ▼6.2% |
| 10 | Russia | Adler-Sochi International Airport | Sochi | 4,088,606 | ▲31.6% |
| 11 | Russia | Tolmachevo Airport | Novosibirsk | 3,703,211 | ▼6.4% |
| 12 | Kazakhstan | Astana Airport | Astana | 3,366,560 | ▲13.7% |
| 13 | Lithuania | Vilnius Airport | Vilnius | 3,336,084 | ▲13.3% |
| 14 | Russia | Pashkovsky Airport | Krasnodar | 3,128,248 | ▼8.5% |
| 15 | Azerbaijan | Heydar Aliyev International Airport | Baku | ~3,000,000 | Steady |
| 16 | Uzbekistan | Tashkent International Airport | Tashkent | 2,997,000 | ▼3.3% |
| 17 | Belarus | Minsk National Airport | Minsk | 2,782,866 | ▲7.3% |
| 18 | Russia | Ufa International Airport | Ufa | 2,313,358 | ▼2.8% |
| 19 | Moldova | Chișinău International Airport | Chișinău | 2,219,162 | ▲24.6% |
| 20 | Russia | Kurumoch Airport | Samara | 2,208,127 | ▼7.1% |
| 21 | Estonia | Lennart Meri Airport | Tallinn | 2,166,663 | ▲7.4% |
| 22 | Russia | Rostov-on-Don Airport | Rostov-on-Don | 2,062,761 | ▼11.9% |
| 23 | Russia | Mineralnye Vody Airport | Mineralnye Vody | 1,957,122 | ▲1.8% |
| 24 | Armenia | Zvartnots International Airport | Yerevan | 1,879,667 | ▼7.7% |
| 25 | Georgia | Tbilisi International Airport | Tbilisi | 1,847,111 | ▲17.2% |
| 26 | Russia | Khabarovsk Novy Airport | Khabarovsk | 1,821,694 | ▼10.6% |
| 27 | Russia | Yemelyanovo International Airport | Krasnoyarsk | 1,804,821 | ▼12.6% |
| 28 | Russia | Kazan International Airport | Kazan | 1,794,735 | ▼7.6% |
| 29 | Kyrgyzstan | Manas International Airport | Bishkek | 1,778,603 | ▲5.9% |
| 30 | Russia | Knevichi Airport | Vladivostok | 1,698,000 | ▼5.0% |
| 31 | Russia | International Airport Irkutsk | Irkutsk | 1,694,285 | ▼1.1% |
| 32 | Russia | Khrabrovo Airport | Kaliningrad | 1,542,360 | ▲5.6% |
| 33 | Turkmenistan | Saparmurat Türkmenbaşy International Airport | Aşgabat | ~1,500,000(2013) | Steady |
| 34 | Russia | Surgut International Airport | Surgut | 1.432,097 | ▲5.4% |
| 35 | Russia | Roshchino Airport | Tyumen | 1,390,000 | ▲2,2% |
| 36 | Russia | Bolshoye Savino Airport | Perm | 1,288,368 | ▼2.3% |
| 37 | Kyrgyzstan | Osh Airport | Osh | 1,253,914 | ▼2.9% |
| 38 | Russia | Balandino Airport | Chelyabinsk | 1,239,212 | ▼11.8% |
| 39 | Russia | Vityazevo Airport | Anapa | 1,178,984 | ▲17.1% |
| 40 | Tajikistan | Dushanbe International Airport | Dushanbe | 1,135,000 | ▼12,1% |

^*The political status of Crimea is the subject of a political and territorial dispute between Russia and Ukraine.

== 2014 statistics ==
| Rank 2014 | Country | Airport | City | Passengers 2014 | Change 2013–2014 |
|---|---|---|---|---|---|
| 1 | Russia | Domodedovo Airport | Moscow | 33,039,531 | ▲7.4% |
| 2 | Russia | Sheremetyevo Airport | Moscow | 31,567,974 | ▲7.9% |
| 3 | Russia | Pulkovo Airport | Saint Petersburg | 14,264,732 | ▲11.0% |
| 4 | Russia | Vnukovo Airport | Moscow | 12,733,118 | ▲13,9% |
| 5 | Ukraine | Boryspil Airport | Kyiv | 6,890,443 | ▼13.1% |
| 6 | Latvia | Riga International Airport | Riga | 4,813,959 | ▲0.4% |
| 7 | Kazakhstan | Almaty Airport | Almaty | 4,588,866 | ▲6.0% |
| 8 | Russia | Koltsovo Airport | Yekaterinburg | 4,526,167 | ▲5.4% |
| 9 | Russia | Tolmachevo Airport | Novosibirsk | 3,957,667 | ▲5.4% |
| 10 | Russia | Pashkovsky Airport | Krasnodar | 3,417,845 | ▲19.8% |
| 11 | Russia | Sochi International Airport | Sochi | 3,107,425 | ▲27.7% |
| 12 | Uzbekistan | Tashkent International Airport | Tashkent | 3,100,000 | ▼5.1% |
| 13 | Azerbaijan | Heydar Aliyev International Airport | Baku | 2,966,725 | ▲3.8% |
| 14 | Kazakhstan | Astana Airport | Astana | 2,960,181 | ▲13.0% |
| 15 | Lithuania | Vilnius Airport | Vilnius | 2,942,670 | ▲10.5% |
| 16 | Ukraine/Russia^{*} | Simferopol International Airport | Simferopol | 2,800,000 | ▲130.0% |
| 17 | Belarus | Minsk National Airport | Minsk | 2,593,559 | ▲18.7% |
| 18 | Russia | Ufa International Airport | Ufa | 2,380,581 | ▲7.3% |
| 19 | Russia | Kurumoch Airport | Samara | 2,377,418 | ▲14.7% |
| 20 | Russia | Rostov-on-Don Airport | Rostov-on-Don | 2,342,302 | ▲6.9% |
| 21 | Russia | Yemelyanovo International Airport | Krasnoyarsk | 2,066,020 | ▲0.1% |
| 22 | Armenia | Zvartnots International Airport | Yerevan | 2,045,058 | ▲20.9% |
| 23 | Russia | Khabarovsk Novy Airport | Khabarovsk | 2,038,307 | ▼2.4% |
| 24 | Estonia | Lennart Meri Airport | Tallinn | 2,017,291 | ▲3.0% |
| 25 | Russia | Kazan International Airport | Kazan | 1,942,408 | ▲5.2% |
| 26 | Russia | Mineralnye Vody Airport | Mineralnye Vody | 1,921,669 | ▲30.4% |
| 27 | Russia | Knevichi Airport | Vladivostok | 1,792,000 | ▼3.3% |
| 28 | Moldova | Chișinău International Airport | Chișinău | 1,781,469 | ▲34.3% |
| 29 | Russia | International Airport Irkutsk | Irkutsk | 1,712,781 | ▲9.1% |
| 30 | Kyrgyzstan | Manas International Airport | Bishkek | 1,679,800 | ▲22.4% |
| 31 | Georgia | Tbilisi International Airport | Tbilisi | 1,575,386 | ▲9,7% |
| 32 | Turkmenistan | Saparmurat Türkmenbaşy International Airport | Aşgabat | ~1,500,000 (2013) | Steady |
| 33 | Russia | Khrabrovo Airport | Kaliningrad | 1,458,591 | ▲11.1% |
| 34 | Russia | Balandino Airport | Chelyabinsk | 1,404,238 | ▲16.0% |
| 35 | Russia | Roshchino Airport | Tyumen | 1,369,094 | ▼0.3% |
| 36 | Russia | Surgut International Airport | Surgut | 1,358,983 | ▲3.6% |
| 37 | Russia | Bolshoye Savino Airport | Perm | 1,319,253 | ▲14.6% |
| 38 | Tajikistan | Dushanbe International Airport | Dushanbe | 1,291,541 | ▲5.1% |
| 39 | Kyrgyzstan | Osh Airport | Osh | 1,253,914 | ▲25.8% |
| 40 | Russia | Strigino Airport | Nizhny Novgorod | 1,131,874 | ▲23.4% |
| 41 | Ukraine | Kyiv International Airport | Kyiv | 1,090,120 | ▼40.7% |
| 42 | Russia | Omsk Airport | Omsk | 1,044,982 | ▲7.1% |
| 43 | Russia | Vityazevo Airport | Anapa | 1,012,000 | ▲36.8% |

^*The political status of Crimea is the subject of a political and territorial dispute between Russia and Ukraine. The Crimean Peninsula was annexed by the Russian Federation in February–March 2014. In 2016, UN General Assembly reaffirmed non-recognition of the annexation and condemned "the temporary occupation of part of the territory of Ukraine—the Autonomous Republic of Crimea and the city of Sevastopol".

== 2013 statistics ==
| Rank 2013 | Country | Airport | City | Passengers 2013 | Change 2012–2013 |
|---|---|---|---|---|---|
| 1 | Russia | Moscow Domodedovo Airport | Moscow | 30,765,078 | ▲9.2% |
| 2 | Russia | Sheremetyevo International Airport | Moscow | 29,256,200 | ▲11.7% |
| 3 | Russia | Pulkovo Airport | Saint Petersburg | 12,854,366 | ▲15.2% |
| 4 | Russia | Vnukovo International Airport | Moscow | 11,175,116 | ▲15.2% |
| 5 | Ukraine | Boryspil International Airport | Kyiv | 7,927,500 | ▼6.5% |
| 6 | Latvia | Riga International Airport | Riga | 4,793,045 | ▲0.6% |
| 7 | Kazakhstan | Almaty Airport | Almaty | 4,323,224 | ▲8.0% |
| 8 | Russia | Koltsovo Airport | Yekaterinburg | 4,293,002 | ▲13.6% |
| 9 | Russia | Tolmachevo Airport | Novosibirsk | 3,748,211 | ▲14.7% |
| 10 | Uzbekistan | Tashkent International Airport | Tashkent | 3,265,000 | ▲1.0% |
| 11 | Azerbaijan | Heydar Aliyev International Airport | Baku | 2,857,000 | ▲16.0% |
| 12 | Russia | Pashkovsky Airport | Krasnodar | 2,853,394 | ▲10.0% |
| 13 | Lithuania | Vilnius Airport | Vilnius | 2,661,869 | ▲20.6% |
| 14 | Kazakhstan | Astana Airport | Astana | 2,609,431 | ▲15.0% |
| 15 | Russia | Adler-Sochi International Airport | Sochi | 2,427,676 | ▲14.5% |
| 16 | Russia | Ufa International Airport | Ufa | 2,218,000 | ▲15.6% |
| 17 | Russia | Rostov-on-Don Airport | Rostov-on-Don | 2,190,726 | ▲16.9% |
| 18 | Belarus | Minsk National Airport | Minsk | 2,182,177 | ▲18.7% |
| 19 | Russia | Kurumoch Airport | Samara | 2,167,728 | ▲14.7% |
| 20 | Russia | Khabarovsk Novy Airport | Khabarovsk | 2,089,097 | ▲10.9% |
| 21 | Russia | Yemelyanovo International Airport | Krasnoyarsk | 2,064,629 | ▲8.7% |
| 22 | Estonia | Lennart Meri Tallinn Airport | Tallinn | 1,958,801 | ▼11.2% |
| 23 | Russia | Knevichi Airport | Vladivostok | 1,853,000 | ▲14.1% |
| 24 | Russia | Kazan International Airport | Kazan | 1,847,158 | ▲24.2% |
| 25 | Ukraine | Kyiv International Airport | Kyiv | 1,838,393 | ▲113.0% |
| 26 | Armenia | Zvartnots International Airport | Yerevan | 1,691,710 | ▼0.0% |
| 27 | Russia | International Airport Irkutsk | Irkutsk | 1,569,011 | ▲12.1% |
| 28 | Turkmenistan | Saparmurat Türkmenbaşy International Airport | Aşgabat | ~1,500,000 | Steady |
| 29 | Russia | Mineralnye Vody Airport | Mineralnye Vody | 1,473,446 | ▲15.2% |
| 30 | Georgia | Tbilisi International Airport | Tbilisi | 1,436,046 | ▲17.8% |
| 31 | Russia | Roshchino Airport | Tyumen | 1,372,621 | ▲10.8% |
| 32 | Kyrgyzstan | Manas International Airport | Bishkek | 1,372,380 | ▲30.4% |
| 33 | Moldova | Chișinău International Airport | Chișinău | 1,321,362 | ▲8.3% |
| 34 | Russia | Khrabrovo Airport | Kaliningrad | 1,314,046 | ▲10.6% |
| 35 | Russia | Surgut International Airport | Surgut | 1,311,730 | ▲12.3% |
| 36 | Tajikistan | Dushanbe International Airport | Dushanbe | 1,228,869 | ▼5.6% |
| 37 | Russia | Balandino Airport | Chelyabinsk | 1,210,388 | ▲20.9% |
| 38 | Ukraine | Simferopol International Airport | Simferopol | 1,204,400 | ▲8.1% |
| 39 | Russia | Bolshoye Savino Airport | Perm | 1,150,929 | ▲15.8% |
| 40 | Ukraine | Donetsk Sergey Prokofiev International Airport | Donetsk | 1,110,459 | ▲11.0% |
| 41 | Ukraine | Odesa International Airport | Odesa | 1,069,100 | ▲17.8% |

== See also ==
- List of the busiest airports in Armenia
- List of the busiest airports in the Baltic states
- List of the busiest airports in Georgia (country)
- List of the busiest airports in Kazakhstan
- List of the busiest airports in Russia
- List of the busiest airports in Ukraine
