= Rzhaksinsky District =

Rzhaksinsky District Ржаксинский район (Russian)
- District
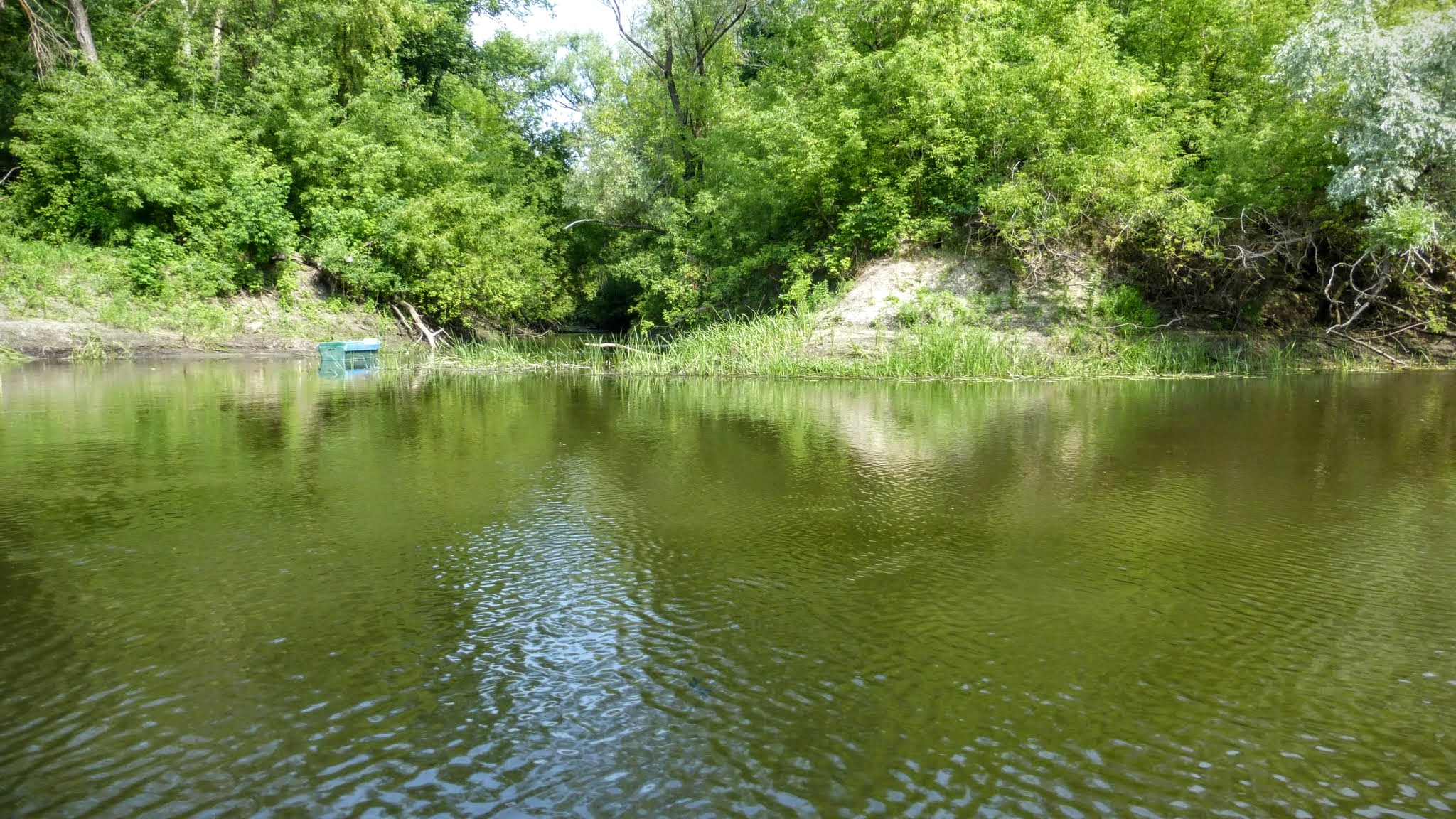
- River in Rzhaksinsky District

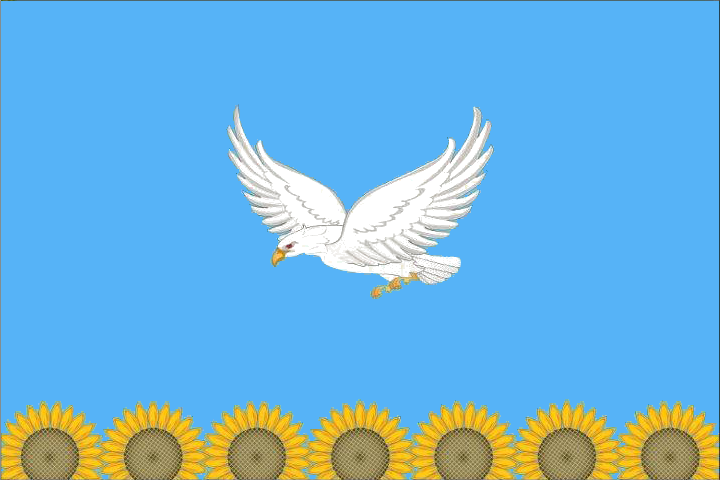
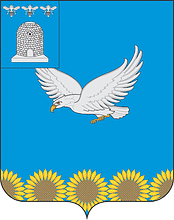
- Flag Coat of arms
- Location of Rzhaksinsky District in Tambov Oblast
- Coordinates: 52°08′N 42°01′E
- Country: Russia
- Federal subject: Tambov Oblast
- Established: 1928
- Administrative center: Rzhaksa

Area
  - Total: 1,415 km^{2} (546 sq mi)

Population (2010 Census)
  - Total: 18,565
  - Density: 13.12/km^{2} (33.98/sq mi)
  - Urban: 28.0%
  - Rural: 72.0%

Administrative structure
  - Administrative divisions: 1 Settlement councils, 10 Selsoviets
  - Inhabited localities: 1 urban-type settlements, 88 rural localities

Municipal structure
  - Municipally incorporated as: Rzhaksinsky Municipal District
  - Municipal divisions: 1 urban settlements, 10 rural settlements
- Time zone: UTC+3 (MSK)
- OKTMO ID: 68630000
- Website: http://r55.tmbreg.ru/

Rzhaksinsky District (Russian: Ржаксинский райо́н) is an administrative and municipal district (raion), one of the twenty-three in Tambov Oblast, Russia. It is located in the south of the oblast. The district borders with Rasskazovsky District in the north, Inzhavinsky District in the east, Uvarovsky District in the south, and with Sampursky District in the west. The area of the district is 1,415 square kilometers (546 sq mi). Its administrative center is the urban locality (a work settlement) of Rzhaksa. Population: 18,565 (2010 Census); 21,981 (2002 census); 26,111 (1989 Soviet census). The population of Rzhaksa accounts for 28.0% of the district's total population.

== Notable residents ==
- Vladimir Semyonov (1911–1992), Soviet diplomat

== See also ==
- Inokovka
