= Aeroflot Flight 513 =

1965 aviation accident

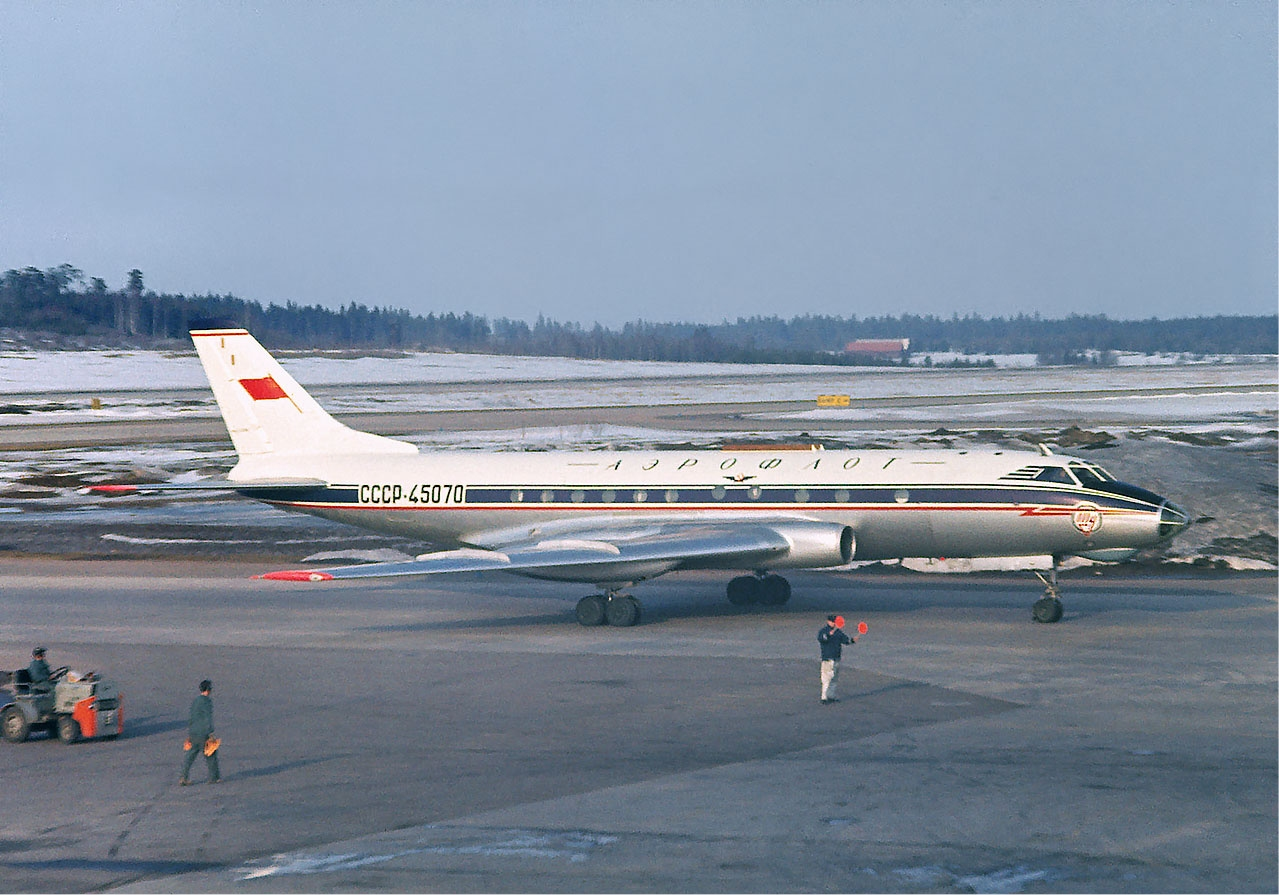
- An Aeroflot Tupolev Tu-124, similar to the one involved in the accident

Accident
- Date: 8 March 1965
- Summary: Stall, loss of control
- Site: Near Kuybyshev Airport, Soviet Union

Aircraft
- Aircraft type: Tupolev Tu-124
- Operator: Aeroflot
- Registration: CCCP-45028
- Flight origin: Kuybyshev Airport
- Stopover: Rostov-on-Don Airport
- Destination: Sochi International Airport
- Occupants: 39
- Passengers: 30
- Crew: 9
- Fatalities: 30
- Survivors: 9

Aeroflot Flight 513 was a domestic scheduled passenger from Kuybyshev Airport, Soviet Union, to Sochi International Airport, Soviet Union, with a stopover at Rostov-on-Don Airport, Soviet Union. On 8 March 1965, the Tupolev Tu-124 operating this route crashed shortly after takeoff from Kuybyshev Airport, resulting in the deaths of 30 passengers and crew and leaving 9 survivors. It was the first fatal accident involving a Tupolev Tu-124.

== Background ==
=== Aircraft ===
The aircraft involved was a Tupolev Tu-124V with two Soloviev D-20P engines, registered CCCP-45028 to the Soviet Union's state airline, Aeroflot. At the time of the accident, the aircraft had accumulated 1,612 flight hours and 1,151 pressurization cycles in service.

=== Crew ===
Thirty passengers and nine crew members were on board the flight. The crew consisted of the following:

- Captain Ivan Kostin
- Captain trainee Victor Sjulin
- Check captain Pavel Saveliev
- Co-pilot Victor Kiryakov
- Radio operator Evgeny Ivanov
- Flight engineer Alexander Danilov
- Navigator Leonid Gostev

Stewardesses Zoya Chicherina and Tamara Kolesnikova worked in the cabin.

== Flight and accident ==
The aircraft was de-iced before takeoff. In the cockpit, the check captain observing the trainee's performance sat on the right; the trainee sat on the left. The captains and first officer remained in the cabin and did not assist the trainee and check captain during takeoff. Flight 513 took off from the runway at a bearing of 100°. At an altitude of 40–50 meters the angle of attack increased to the point of causing a stall. The Tu-124 never recovered from the stall and crashed into a field of snow. All 9 crew members and 21 out of 30 passengers died in the accident. There were initially 16 passenger fatalities, but five passengers later died in hospital from their injuries.
