= Inokovka =

Settlement in Tambov Oblast, Russia

Coordinates: 52°21′50″N 42°05′15″E

Inokovka (Russian: Иноковка) is a settlement in Rzhaksinsky District of Tambov Oblast, Russia.
