= Aeroflot Flight 99 =

1965 aviation accident

Coordinates: 69°6′59″N 32°27′24″E

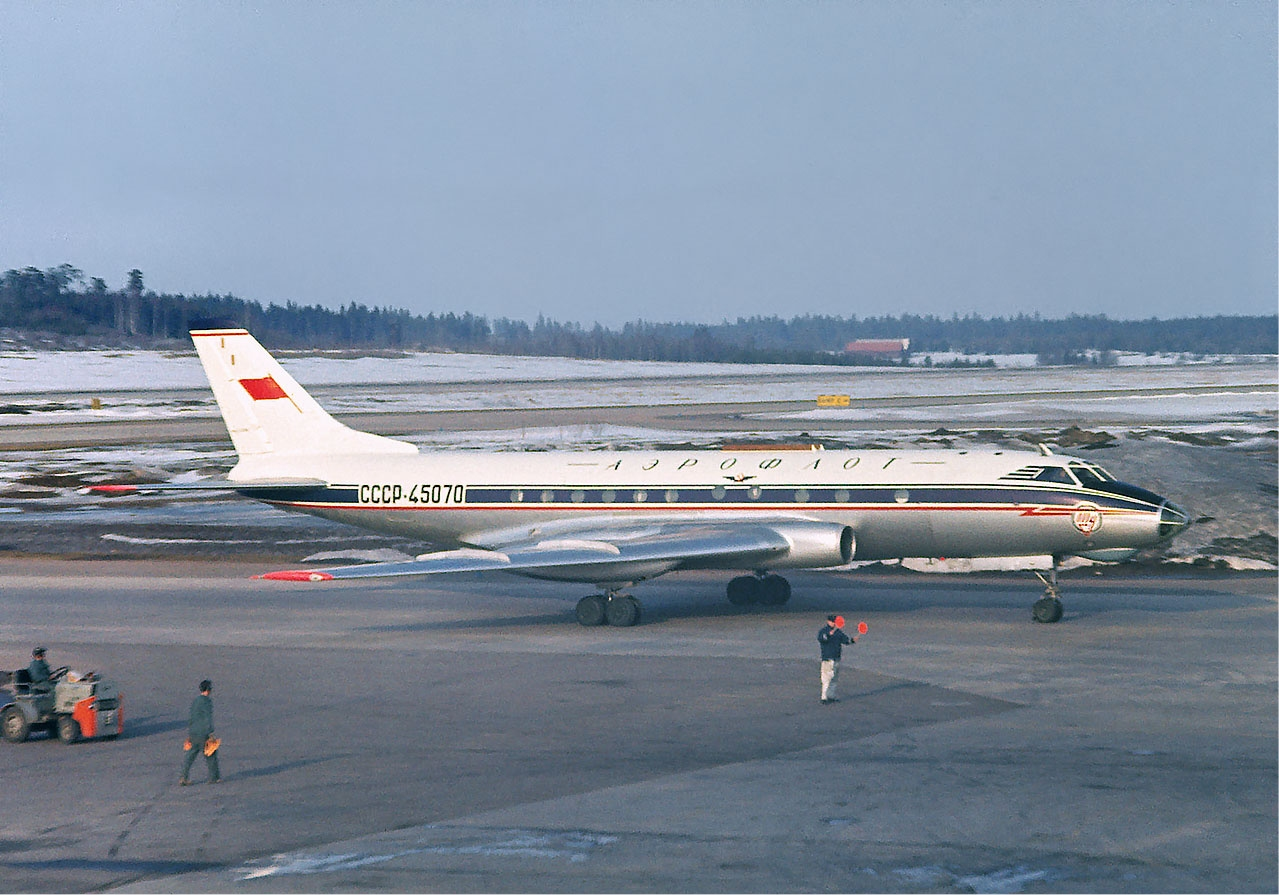
- An Aeroflot Tupolev Tu-124 similar to the one involved in the accident.

Accident
- Date: 11 November 1965
- Summary: Controlled flight into terrain
- Site: 1.5 km from Murmansk Airport, RSFSR, Soviet Union

Aircraft
- Aircraft type: Tupolev Tu-124V
- Operator: Aeroflot
- Registration: CCCP-45086
- Flight origin: Leningrad-Pulkovo Airport
- Destination: Murmansk Airport
- Occupants: 64
- Passengers: 57
- Crew: 7
- Fatalities: 32
- Survivors: 32

Aeroflot Flight 99 was a Tupolev Tu-124 operating a scheduled domestic passenger flight from Leningrad to Murmansk, both in the Soviet Union, which crashed while attempting to land on 11 November 1965. Of the 64 passengers and crew on board, 32 were killed in the accident, and many of the survivors sustained injuries.

== Aircraft ==
The aircraft involved in the accident was a Tupolev Tu-124 registered as CCCP-45086 to Aeroflot. The aircraft was rather new as it had rolled off the assembly line in August 1965. At the time of the accident, the aircraft had sustained 357 flight hours and 300 pressurization cycles. (one cycle equals one takeoff and landing)

== Accident ==
The flight departed Leningrad-Pulkovo Airport at 2:21 pm. The flight went smoothly during takeoff and cruise. Weather conditions deteriorated around the destination of Murmansk with snow, cumulonimbus clouds at 260 meters and visibility of 1.5 km.

At 15:50, 7 minutes before the estimated time of arrival, the air traffic controller informed the flight of the deteriorating weather conditions at the airport and instructed the flight to fly at an altitude of 2400 meters; shortly thereafter he ordered the aircraft to reduce altitude again to reach 700 meters. The bearing for the landing was 215°.

When the flight was at an altitude of 800 meters the captain began a turn, losing altitude quicker than anticipated. During the approach, 7100 meters from the runway, the Tupolev was flying 400 m to the left of the extended centerline. When the flight was at an altitude of 180 meters and trying to pass the non-directional beacon that was about 2400 meters from the runway, the aircraft entered the snowstorm. Shortly thereafter the pilot-in-command increased the rate of descent, and at 15:57 the Tu-124 crashed into the frozen Lake Kilpyavr while 273 meters short of the beacon and 2127 meters short of the runway.

After hitting the ice the aircraft lost the left wing, and the fuselage broke in two, separating from the cockpit. The right wing then separated. The fuselage stopped on the ice 1562 m from the beginning of the runway, and quickly sank. Soldiers managed to save several passengers from the sunken fuselage. The cockpit stopped on the ice 166 meters to the left of the fuselage then fell through the ice into shallow waters near a small island in the middle of the lake; It sank partially. All crew members except the navigator and dispatcher managed to escape. Soldiers stationed at a building near the beacon rushed to rescue the passengers and crew from the crash, but 32 of the 64 people aboard perished in the crash.

== Cause ==
The pilots descended below the glidepath but did not notice their mistake immediately. What the pilots thought were runway lights were actually lights from a neighborhood near the airport, causing the pilots to think they had not descended enough; hence they increased the rate of descent even more. When the pilots noticed the mistake, it was too late and the aircraft crashed onto the frozen lake. Secondary reasons for the crash included that the airport was not equipped with glidepath approach lights, and the air traffic controller had failed to warn the crew that their altitude was too low relative to their proximity to the runway.
