= Murmansk Airport =

Airport in Murmansk, Russia

Emperor Nicholas II Murmansk Airport

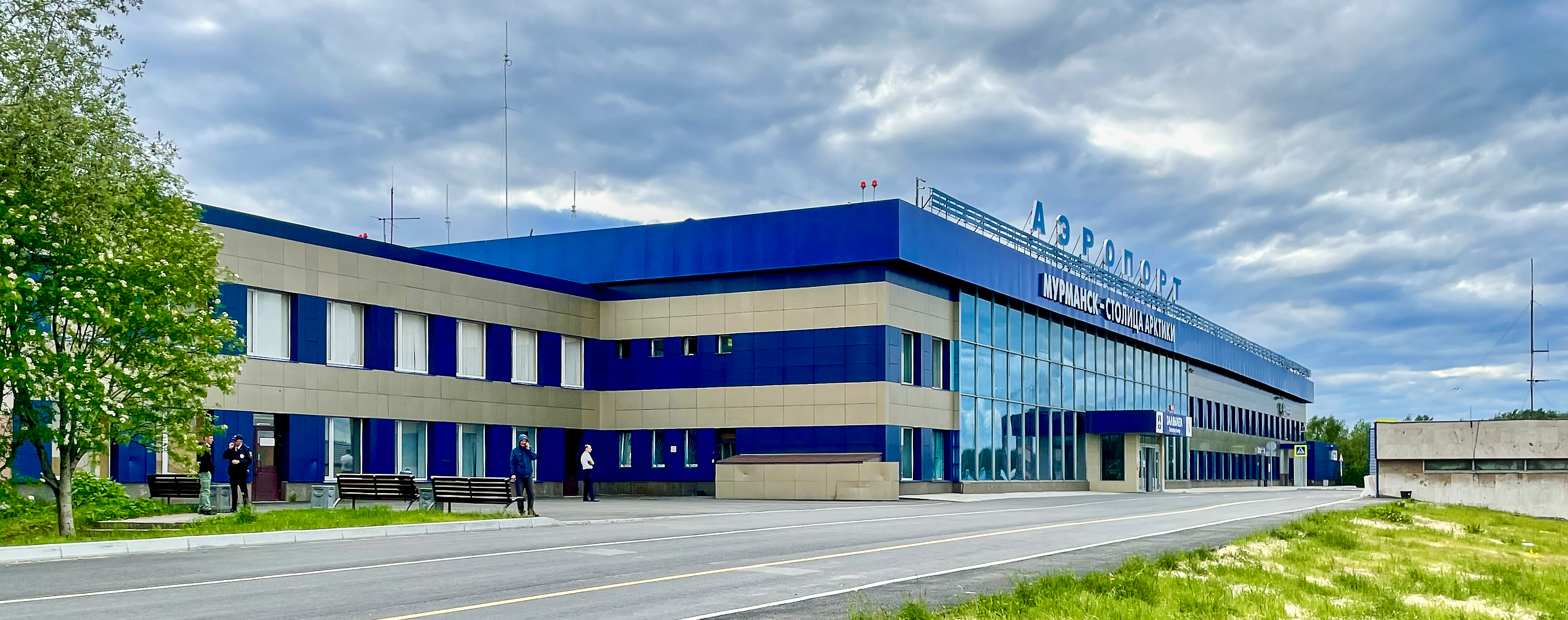
- IATA: MMK; ICAO: ULMM; LID: МУН

Summary
- Airport type: Public
- Operator: JSC "Airport Murmansk"
- Serves: Murmansk, Russia
- Location: Murmashi, Russia
- Coordinates: 68°47′01.68″N 32°45′21.41″E
- Website: airport-murmansk.ru

Map
- Location of the airport in Murmansk Oblast Location of the airport in Russia Location of the airport in Europe

Runways
Direction	Length		Surface
Direction	ft	m	Surface
13/31	8,202	2,500	Paved

Statistics (2018)
- Passengers: 938,022
- Sources: Russian Federal Air Transport Agency (see also provisional 2018 statistics)

Emperor Nicholas II Murmansk Airport (Russian: Аэропо́рт Му́рманска им. Николая II or Аэропорт Мурмаши; IATA: MMK, ICAO: ULMM) is an international airport serving the city Murmansk in Russia. It is located near the town of Murmashi in Murmansk's southern suburbs, 24 kilometres (15 mi) outside the city centre. It serves as the airline hub for Smartavia.

As of 2019, it is the 31st busiest airport in Russia and 53rd busiest airport in the former USSR. The airport served 763,668 passengers in 2016, an increase of 1.65% from 2015. In 2017 it served 845,928 passengers, an increase of 10.8% from 2016.

== History ==
Previously, the airfield had military significance and was called Murmashi airfield. During the Soviet-Finnish war, the Soviet 147th fighter aviation regiment, provided with Polikarpov I-15 bis, I-16 and I-153 aircraft, was based at the airfield. After the German invasion of USSR, the 147th fighter aviation regiment performed tasks to cover Murmansk and the Kirov Railway from German air raids. From July 1941, the regiment received MiG-3 aircraft, which it used until the spring of 1942. In mid-July 1941, the regiment included four MiG-3s designed to intercept enemy bombers and by the end of the month received 17 MiG-3s. In January 1942, the regiment received P-40 Tomahawk aircraft. The regiment was based at the airfield until the spring of 1945.

In November 2015, Novaport bought out the Murmansk Airport from its former owner, Gazprom Oil, with the aim to develop flights from the low-cost airline Pobeda to the airport.

== Terminals ==
=== Passenger terminal ===
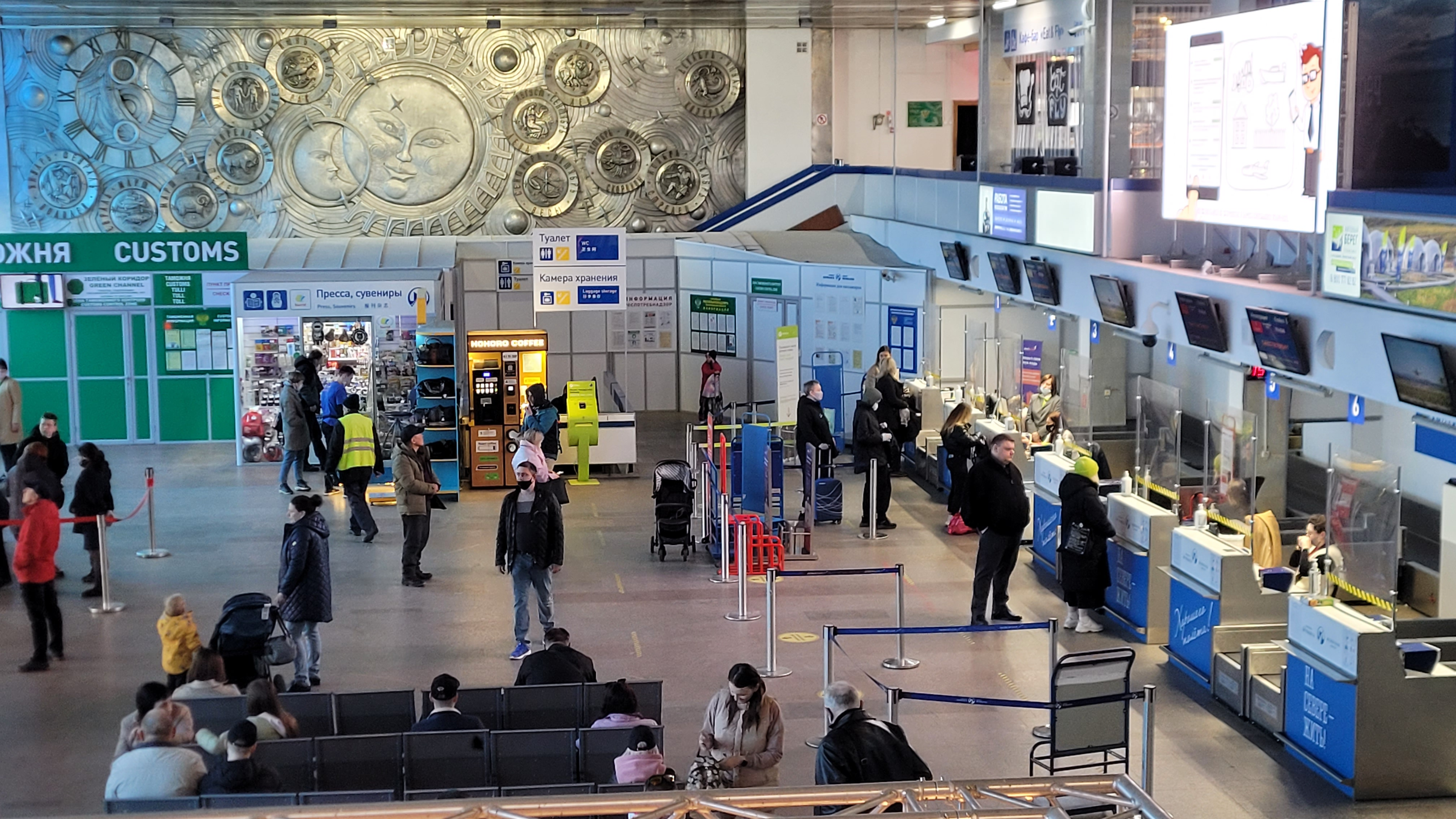
Interior of Murmansk airport

On the ground floor of the only civilian passenger terminal there are check-in counters, waiting room, international zone, cafes and souvenir shops. On the second floor there is a cafe, a duty-free shop, airline representative offices and souvenir shops. The duty-free store is located only in the international zone.

The arrival zones are located on the first floors — in the right ("arrival hall B") and left ("arrival hall A") wings of the building. There is also a hall for VIP guests, where inspection and check-in takes place separately from other passengers.

=== Cargo terminal ===
The cargo terminal with an area of 400 m^{2} is located on a fenced territory, in the area under responsibility for transport security.

== Airlines and destinations ==
Airlines	Destinations
Aeroflot	Moscow–Sheremetyevo
Arktikugol	Charter: Longyearbyen
Belavia	Seasonal: Minsk
Ikar	Kazan
Pobeda	Moscow–Sheremetyevo
Rossiya Airlines	Saint Petersburg
Severstal Air Company	Arkhangelsk–Talagi, Cherepovets
Smartavia	Kaliningrad, Moscow–Sheremetyevo, Saint Petersburg; Seasonal: Sochi
UVT Aero	Seasonal: Petrozavodsk (begins 3 June 2026)

== Statistics ==
	2005	2006	2007	2008	2009	2010	2012	2013	2014	2015	2016	2017	2018	2019
Passengers				403,828	378,171		545,073	614,110	667,065	751,258	763,679	845,928	938,023	1,029,661
Mail and cargo (in tons)				1,485	1,355							2,366		

== Accidents and incidents ==
On 11 November 1965, Aeroflot Flight 99 crashed while on approach to Murmansk Airport. 32 of the 64 passengers and crew on board were killed in the accident.

== In popular culture ==
In the novel The Long Dark Tea-Time of the Soul by Douglas Adams, it is stated that Murmansk Airport is the only airport that is not full of tired, cross people who have found that their luggage is in Murmansk Airport. The airport also briefly serves as a location in the Alex Rider novel Skeleton Key by Anthony Horowitz.

== See also ==
- List of the busiest airports in Russia
- List of the busiest airports in Europe
- List of the busiest airports in the former USSR
