= List of the busiest airports in Georgia (country) =

== Georgia's airports by passenger traffic in 2024 ==
Rank	Airport	Location	Total passengers	Annual change	Rank change
1	Shota Rustaveli Tbilisi International Airport	Tbilisi	4,750,830	▲28.61%	Steady
2	David the Builder Kutaisi International Airport	Kutaisi	1,722,809	▲3.09%	Steady
3	Alexander Kartveli Batumi International Airport	Batumi	951,760	▲53.14%	Steady
4	Natakhtari Airfield	Natakhtari	TBU	TBU	TBU
5	Queen Tamar Airport	Mestia	9,759	▼4.48%	Steady
6	Ambrolauri Airport	Ambrolauri	1,825	▼16.59%	Steady

== Georgia's airports by passenger traffic in 2023 ==
Rank	Airport	Location	Total passengers	Annual change	Rank change
1	Shota Rustaveli Tbilisi International Airport	Tbilisi	3,694,052	▲23.19%	Steady
2	David the Builder Kutaisi International Airport	Kutaisi	1,671,198	▲109.93%	Steady
3	Alexander Kartveli Batumi International Airport	Batumi	621,514	▲0.75%	Steady
4	Natakhtari Airfield	Natakhtari	14,789	▲16.00%	▲2
5	Queen Tamar Airport	Mestia	10,217	▲8.87%	▼1
6	Ambrolauri Airport	Ambrolauri	2,225	▼16.26%	▼1

== Georgia's airports by passenger traffic in 2022 ==
Rank	Airport	Location	Total passengers	Annual change	Rank change
1	Shota Rustaveli Tbilisi International Airport	Tbilisi	2,998,785	▲78.11%	Steady
2	David the Builder Kutaisi International Airport	Kutaisi	796,063	▲181.78%	▲1
3	Alexander Kartveli Batumi International Airport	Batumi	616,885	▲19.55%	▼1
4	Queen Tamar Airport	Mestia	9,385	▲82.55%	Steady
5	Ambrolauri Airport	Ambrolauri	2,657	▲32.85%	Steady

== Georgia's airports by passenger traffic in 2021 ==
Rank	Airport	Location	Total passengers	Annual change	Rank change
1	Shota Rustaveli Tbilisi International Airport	Tbilisi	1,683,696	▲185.31%	Steady
2	Alexander Kartveli Batumi International Airport	Batumi	516,017	▲903.69%	▲1
3	David the Builder Kutaisi International Airport	Kutaisi	282,514	▲53.65%	▼1
4	Queen Tamar Airport	Mestia	5,141	▲62.43%	Steady
5	Ambrolauri Airport	Ambrolauri	2,000	▲64.74%	Steady

== Georgia's airports by passenger traffic in 2020 ==
Rank	Airport	Location	Total passengers	Annual change	Rank change
1	Shota Rustaveli Tbilisi International Airport	Tbilisi	590,123	▼84.02%	Steady
2	David the Builder Kutaisi International Airport	Kutaisi	183,873	▼78.95%	Steady
3	Alexander Kartveli Batumi International Airport	Batumi	51,412	▼91.76%	Steady
4	Queen Tamar Airport	Mestia	3,165	▼63.30%	Steady
5	Ambrolauri Airport	Ambrolauri	1,214	▼38.25%	Steady

== Georgia's airports by passenger traffic in 2019 ==
Rank	Airport	Location	Total passengers	Annual change	Rank change
1	Shota Rustaveli Tbilisi International Airport	Tbilisi	3,692,175	▼3.05%	Steady
2	David the Builder Kutaisi International Airport	Kutaisi	873,616	▲41.50%	Steady
3	Alexander Kartveli Batumi International Airport	Batumi	624,151	▲4.22%	Steady
4	Queen Tamar Airport	Mestia	8,625	▲25.77%	Steady
5	Ambrolauri Airport	Ambrolauri	1,966	▲24.27%	Steady

== Georgia's airports by passenger traffic in 2018 ==
Rank	Airport	Location	Total passengers	Annual change	Rank change
1	Shota Rustaveli Tbilisi International Airport	Tbilisi	3,808,619	▲20.37%	Steady
2	David the Builder Kutaisi International Airport	Kutaisi	617,373	▲52.37%	▲1
3	Alexander Kartveli Batumi International Airport	Batumi	598,891	▲20.83%	▼1
4	Queen Tamar Airport	Mestia	6,858	▼5.49%	Steady
5	Ambrolauri Airport	Ambrolauri	1,582	▼8.18%	Steady

== Georgia's airports by passenger traffic in 2017 ==
Rank	Airport	Location	Total passengers	Annual change	Rank change
1	Shota Rustaveli Tbilisi International Airport	Tbilisi	3,164,139	▲40.47%	Steady
2	Alexander Kartveli Batumi International Airport	Batumi	495,668	▲58.69%	Steady
3	David the Builder Kutaisi International Airport	Kutaisi	405,173	▲49.31%	Steady
4	Queen Tamar Airport	Mestia	7,256	▲72.19%	Steady
5	Ambrolauri Airport	Ambrolauri	1,723	0.0%	Steady

== Georgia's airports by passenger traffic in 2016 ==
Rank	Airport	Location	Total passengers	Annual change	Rank change
1	Shota Rustaveli Tbilisi International Airport	Tbilisi	2,252,535	▲21.95%	Steady
2	Alexander Kartveli Batumi International Airport	Batumi	312,343	▲37.91%	Steady
3	David the Builder Kutaisi International Airport	Kutaisi	271,363	▲48.32%	Steady
4	Queen Tamar Airport	Mestia	4,214	▼5.62%	Steady

== See also ==
- List of the busiest airports in Asia
- List of the busiest airports in Europe
- List of the busiest airports in the former Soviet Union
