= List of airports in Georgia (country) =

This is a list of airports in Georgia, grouped by type and sorted by location.

Georgia is a sovereign state in the Caucasus region of Eurasia. It is bounded to the west by the Black Sea, to the north by Russia, to the south by Turkey and Armenia, and to the east by Azerbaijan. Georgia covers a territory of 69,700 square kilometres (26,911 sq mi) and its population is 3.7 million.

The country is divided into nine regions, two autonomous republics, and the capital city of Tbilisi.

== Passenger statistics ==
Georgian airports with number of passengers served 2018-2025:

Rank	Airport	City	IATA / ICAO	2018	2019	2020	2021	2022	2023	2024	2025	Change
1.	Tbilisi Airport	Tbilisi	TBS / UGTB	3,808,619	3,692,175	590,123	1,683,696	2,998,785	3,694,205	4,750,425	5,400,000	▲12.80%
2.	Kutaisi Airport	Kutaisi	KUT / UGKO	617,373	873,616	183,873	282,514	796,063	1,671,198	1,722,804	1,824,720	▲6%
3.	Batumi Airport	Batumi	BUS / UGSB	598,891	624,151	51,412	516,017	616,885	621,514	951,766	1,230,200	▲29.25%
4.	Natakhtari Airfield	Natakhtari	— / UGSA						14,789			
5.	Queen Tamar Airport	Mestia	— / UGMS	6,858	8,625	3,165	5,141	9,385	10,217	9,759	10,059	▲0.68%
6.	Ambrolauri Airport	Ambrolauri	— / UGAM	1,582	1,966	1,214	2,000	2,657	2,225	1,825	1,669	-7.89%
TOTAL				5,033,323	5,209,505	829,787	2,489,368	4,423,775	6,014,148	7,436,579	8,466,648	▲12.95

== Airports ==
Locations of Georgian airports with commercial airline services. Bold indicates international airports.

Airport names shown in bold have scheduled passenger service on commercial airlines.

	City served	Region	ICAO	IATA	Airport name	Coordinates
	**Public airports**					
1.	Batumi	Adjara ^{[†]}	UGSB	BUS	**Batumi International Airport**	41°36′37″N 041°35′58″E
2.	Kutaisi	Imereti	UGKO	KUT	**Kutaisi International Airport**	42°10′35″N 042°28′57″E
3.	Tbilisi	(capital)	UGTB	TBS	**Tbilisi International Airport**	41°40′09″N 044°57′17″E
4.	Sukhumi	Abkhazia ^{[‡]}	UGSS	SUI	**Sukhumi Babushara Airport**	42°51′29″N 041°07′41″E
5.	Mestia	Samegrelo-Zemo Svaneti	UGMS		**Queen Tamar Airport**	43°03′16″N 042°45′00″E
6.	Ambrolauri	Racha-Lechkhumi - Kvemo Svaneti	UGAM		**Ambrolauri Airport**	42.5266°N 43.1352°E
7.	Natakhtari	Mtskheta-Mtianeti	UGSA		**Natakhtari Airfield**	41°55′16″N 044°42′50″E
8.	Telavi	Kakheti	UGGT		Telavi Erekle II Airport	41°57′12″N 045°30′29″E
9.	Sighnaghi	Kakheti	UGGN		Tsnori Airport	41.634444°N 46.012778°E
10.	Mukhrani	Mtskheta-Mtianeti	UGMM		Mukhrani Airport	41.933°N 44.583°E
11.	Pskhu	Abkhazia			Pskhu Airfield	43.38620°N 40.810328°E
12.	Ozurgeti	Guria			Ozurgeti Air Base	41.928942°N 41.865335°E
13.	Lagodekhi	Kakheti			Lagodekhi Airfield	41.8150179°N 46.2341595°E
14.	Tsalka	Kvemo-Kartli			Tsalka Helipad	41.593399°N 44.0761986°E
15.	Poti	Samegrelo-Zemo Svaneti			Poti International Airport	42°09′47″N 041°42′08″E
16.	Zugdidi	Samegrelo-Zemo Svaneti			Zugdidi (Ingiri) Airport	42.488665°N 41.818213°E
17.	Akhalkalaki	Samtskhe-Javakheti			Akhalkalaki Airport	41.3769989°N 43.4799995°E
18.	Tskhinvali	Shida-Kartli			Tskhinvali Air Base	42.1899986°N 43.9399986°E
19.	Omalo	Kakheti (Tusheti)			Omalo Airfield (planned)	–
20.	Anaklia	Samegrelo-Zemo Svaneti			Anaklia International Airport (planned)	–
	**Military airports**					
1.	Gudauta	Abkhazia ^{[‡]}			Gudauta Air Base	43°06′14″N 040°34′45″E
2.	Kobuleti	Adjara ^{[†]}			Kobuleti Airfield	41°50′26″N 041°47′57″E
3.	Marneuli	Kvemo Kartli			Marneuli Air Base	41°27′33″N 044°46′59″E
4.	Senaki	Samegrelo-Zemo Svaneti			Senaki Air Base	42°14′34″N 042°03′03″E
5.	Tbilisi	(capital)			Soganlugi Air Base	41°38′57″N 044°56′11″E
6.	Tbilisi	(capital)			Vaziani Military Base	41°37′40″N 045°01′50″E

^{†} Adjara is an autonomous republic of Georgia.
^{‡} Abkhazia is a de facto independent state, and functions as such since the 1992-93 war. However, the vast majority of the international community consider it to be a part of Georgia, legally governed by the de jure Government of the Autonomous Republic of Abkhazia, even though Georgia has no control over it. (see also; International recognition of Abkhazia and South Ossetia).

== See also ==
- Georgian Air Force and Abkhazian Air Force
- Transport in Georgia
- List of airports by ICAO code: U#UG - Georgia
- Tourism in Georgia (country)
