= List of airports in Georgia =

List of airports in Georgia may refer to:

- List of airports in Georgia (country)
- List of airports in Georgia (U.S. state)
