= Vanilla Sky (airline) =

Georgian airline

- Founded: 2008
- Operating bases: Natakhtari Airport
- Focus cities: Batumi, Kutaisi, Mestia
- Fleet size: 2
- Destinations: 5
- Headquarters: Tbilisi, Georgia
- Website: vanillasky.ge

Vanilla Sky (also known as Service Air or AK-Air Georgia) is a privately owned airline headquartered in Tbilisi, Georgia and based at Natakhtari. It was founded in 2008. The airline is part of "Service Air" Company, a subsidiary of Vanilla Sky International Tour Operator. Flights are subsidized by the state to increase mobility and tourism in Georgia with US$5.3 million as the reported amount that the airline was offered by the Georgian Airport Union.

== Destinations ==
As of April 2019, Vanilla Sky serves the following scheduled destinations with additional charter services being on offer:

- Georgia
  - Ambrolauri - Ambrolauri Airport
  - Batumi – Alexander Kartveli Batumi International Airport
  - Kutaisi - David the Builder Kutaisi International Airport
  - Mestia - Queen Tamar Airport
  - Tbilisi / Natakhtari - Natakhtari Airfield

== Fleet ==
As of May 2020, Vanilla Sky (Service Air and AK-Air Georgia) operates the following aircraft:

Vanilla Sky fleet
Aircraft	In service	Registration	Passengers	Notes
Let L-410 UVP-E	1	4L-LSA	19	Operated on flights to Mestia, Ambrolauri and Kutaisi
Embraer 120	1	4L-ESA	30	Operated on the Tbilisi-Batumi route
Total	2			

Vanilla Sky previously operated a different Let L-410 (OK-PRH) on Mestia routes. The flight plan is regularly updated on the airline's Facebook page.
