= List of the busiest airports in Georgia =

List of the busiest airports in Georgia may refer to:

- List of the busiest airports in Georgia (country)
- List of the busiest airports in Georgia (U.S. state)

== See also ==
- Hartsfield–Jackson Atlanta International Airport, the busiest airport in the U.S. state of Georgia and in the United States overall
