= BWG =

BWG may refer to:

- BWG, the IATA and FAA LID code for Bowling Green–Warren County Regional Airport, an airport in Bowling Green, Kentucky
- BWG, the National Rail code for Bowling railway station, West Dunbartonshire, Scotland
- BWG, the OACI code for Blue Wings, a defunct charter airline based in Germany
- BWG Foods, an Irish wholesaler and retail grocery franchise operator
- Bradford West Gwillimbury, a town in Ontario, Canada
- Birmingham Wire Gauge, a unit of wire thickness
