= Ugam =

Ugam or UGAM may refer to:

- Ugam Range, mountain range in Kazakhstan and Uzbekistan
- Ambrolauri Airport (ICAO code UGAM), Georgia
- Ugam, traditional musical genre from Pahang, Malaysia
- Ugam River, Uzbekistan
- Ugam, village in Yecheon County, South Korea
- Ana G. Méndez University, abbreviated as UGAM
