= List of state highways in Georgia =

List of state highways in Georgia may refer to:

- List of state routes in Georgia (U.S. state)
  - List of special state routes in Georgia (U.S. state)
- Transport in Georgia (country)#Highways
