= Connect (aviation forum) =

CONNECT Route Development Forum is a European event aimed at the aviation industry.

== CONNECT background and origins ==
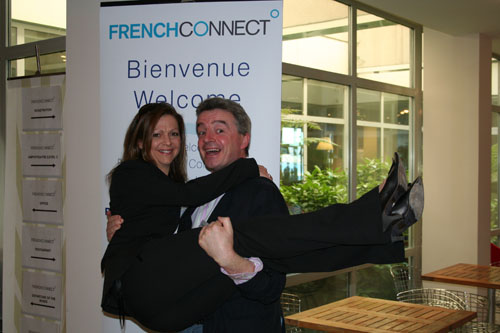
Michael O'Leary, CEO announces a new Ryanair base in Marseille at the original event, French Connect, in Marseille, 2006, together with Karin Butot, MD of The Airport Agency

In 2004, under the name of French Connect, the first event was launched by Alistair Darling, the then UK Secretary of State for Transport and was hosted jointly by Manchester Airport and the recently branded Liverpool John Lennon Airport, which both desired to attract new airlines into their region. Shortly after the first event in Liverpool and Manchester, of the airlines who attended, Wizz Air launched new flights to Liverpool, Jet2.com opened a new base at Manchester and Flybe commenced services to both airports.

Each year, the event, now known as CONNECT, has grown to its present level of 600 delegates, and the event has now been hosted by 15 different international regions from Europe and beyond.

CONNECT (formerly French Connect) was created and has been organised by The Airport Agency since its inception in 2003. The Airport Agency is a marketing communications business with clients including Aéroports de Paris, Bordeaux Airport and Marseille Provence Airport.

== Impact on the French aviation market ==
French Connect was created in 2004 in response to the demand from French airports for a dedicated event that would put them in contact with low-cost carriers. Up to this point, the French market had proved difficult for the low-cost carriers to break into. The event played a part in opening up the French market to the low-cost carriers, witnessed in the development of purpose-built low-cost terminals in France at the likes of Marseille and Bordeaux, and the opening of domestic routes by low-cost carriers (e.g. EasyJet from Bordeaux to Lyon). The event has since broadened its appeal by including politicians, tour operators, suppliers and international guest airports, and has evolved into a larger multinational event and speakers and airline network planners attend from legacy carriers such as British Airways and Air France and airlines and airports from as far as Canada, Cyprus and the Middle East.

== Past event venues and hosts ==
- 2004 Liverpool Marriott Hotel South, Liverpool hosted by Manchester and Liverpool John Lennon Airports
- 2005 Thorseby Hall, Sheffield hosted by Doncaster Sheffield Airport
- 2006 Sofitel Palm Beach Hotel, Marseille hosted by Marseille Provence Airport
- 2007 Atlantia Conference Centre, Nantes hosted by Nantes Atlantique Airport
- 2008 Mercure Courchevel 1850 Congress Centre hosted by Courchevel Airport & Grenoble Isère Airport
- 2009 Strand Hotel, Limerick hosted by Shannon Airport
- 2010 French Connect Village, Cité St Pierre, Lourdes hosted by Tarbes-Lourdes Pyrenées Airport
- 2011 Chambre of Commerce, Lille hosted by Lille Airport
- 2012 The Dome, Disneyland Paris hosted by Paris-Vatry Airport
- 2013 Palais des Congrès, Bordeaux hosted by Bordeaux Airport
- 2014 Palmeraie Conference Center (Palais des Congrès), Marrakech hosted by Moroccan Airports Authority (ONDA)
- 2015 Gleneagle Hotel, Killarney hosted by Kerry Airport
- 2016 National Gallery of Art, Vilnius hosted by Lithuanian Airports
- 2017 Palais des Congrès, Ajaccio hosted by Chamber of Commerce & Industry of Ajaccio & Southern Corsica
- 2018 Biltmore Hotel, Tbilisi hosted by United Airports of Georgia
- 2019 Bastione di San Remy hosted by Cagliari Airport and Sardinia Region
- 2020 Susesi Resort Hotel, Antalya hosted by Antalya Airport
- 2022 Tampere Hall, Tampere hosted by City of Tampere and Business Tampere
- 2023 Hilton Tangier Al Houara Resort, Tangier hosted by Moroccan Airports Authority and Moroccan National Tourism Office
- 2024 Lingotto Fiere, Torino hosted by Visit Piemonte, Torino Airport and Cuneo Airport.
