= United Airports of Georgia =

- საქართველოს აეროპორტების გაერთიანება
- Logo of the UAG
- Formation: 2011; 15 years ago
- Type: State-owned
- Legal status: Limited liability company
- Location: Tbilisi, Georgia
- Region served: Georgia
- Products: Airport operations and services
- Director: Irakli Karkashadze
- Website: airports.ge

United Airports of Georgia LLC (Georgian: საქართველოს აეროპორტების გაერთიანება, romanized: sakartvelos aerop'ort'ebis gaertianeba) is a state-owned company in Georgia established in 2011, functioning under the Ministry of Economy and Sustainable Development. It is the owner on behalf of the Georgian government of the country's civil airports, of which it operates three. The civil airports comprise Tbilisi International Airport and Batumi International Airport, which are both operated by TAV Georgia, and those operated by UAG itself, which are Kutaisi International Airport and two domestic airports, namely, Mestia Airport, also known as Queen Tamar Airport, and (from 2017) Ambrolauri Airport.
