= Red Wings Airlines Flight 9268 =

2012 aviation accident in Russia

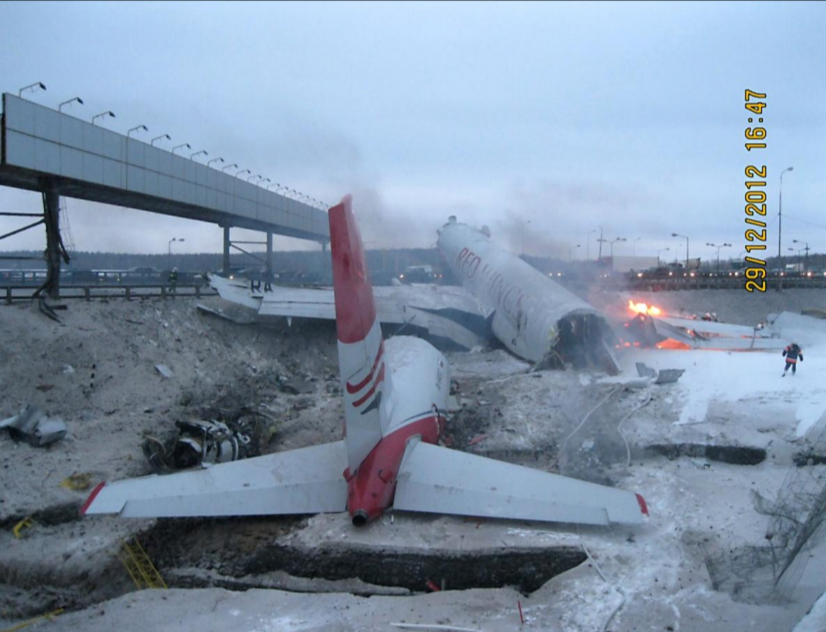
- Wreckage of the aircraft

Accident
- Date: 29 December 2012
- Summary: Runway overrun on landing due to braking system failure and pilot error
- Site: Vnukovo International Airport, Moscow, Russia; 55°35′2″N 37°15′18″E
- Total fatalities: 5
- Total injuries: 4

Aircraft
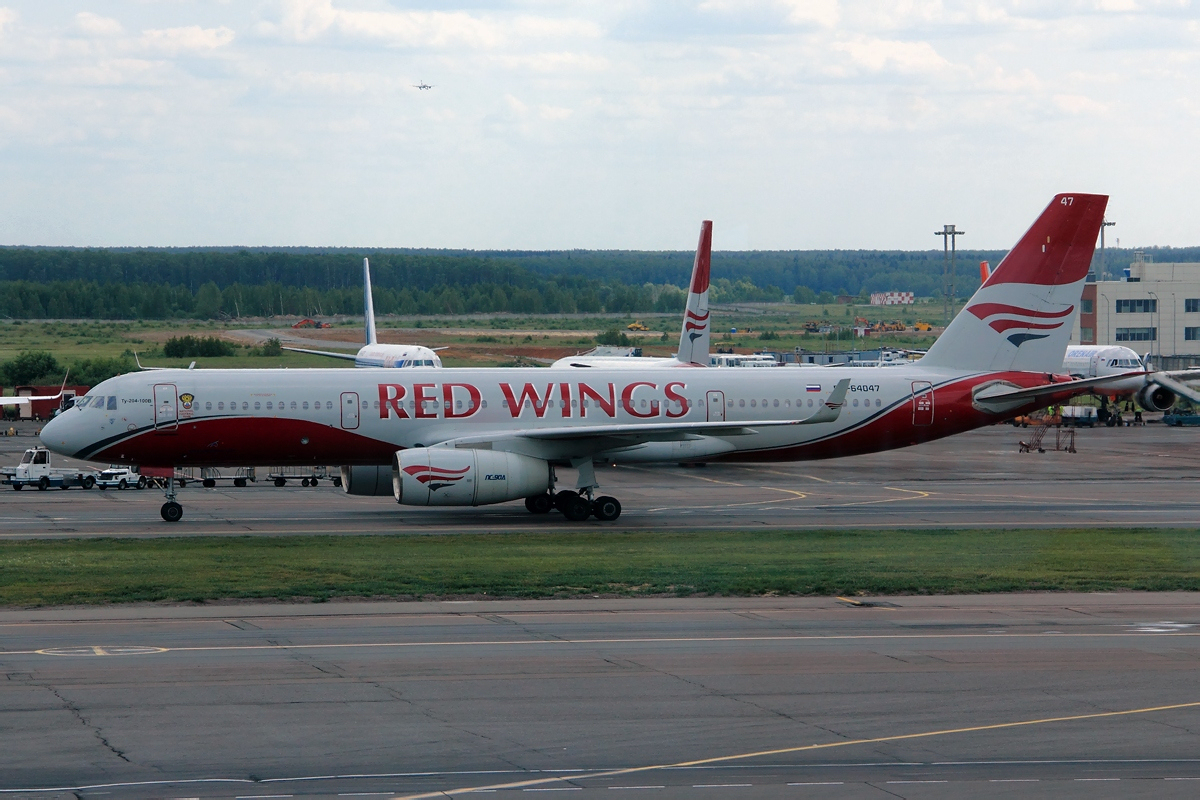
- RA-64047, the aircraft involved in the accident, pictured in 2011
- Aircraft type: Tupolev Tu-204-100B
- Operator: Red Wings Airlines
- IATA flight No.: WZ9268
- ICAO flight No.: RWZ9268
- Call sign: REDWINGS 9268
- Registration: RA-64047
- Flight origin: Pardubice Airport, Pardubice, Czech Republic
- Destination: Vnukovo International Airport, Moscow, Russia
- Occupants: 8
- Crew: 8
- Fatalities: 5
- Injuries: 3
- Survivors: 3

Ground casualties
- Ground injuries: 1

On 29 December 2012, Red Wings Airlines Flight 9268, operated by a Tupolev Tu-204-100 passenger jet, crashed on landing at Moscow Vnukovo Airport, Russia, following a repositioning flight from Pardubice Airport, Czech Republic. There were no passengers on board, but 5 of the 8 crew members were killed when the aircraft hit a ditch and highway structures after overrunning the runway.

The accident marked the second hull-loss of a Tupolev Tu-204, as well as the type's first fatal accident since its introduction in 1989.

== Background ==
According to Vnukovo airport authorities, there were eight crew members onboard and no passengers.

It had been snowing prior to the accident and there was a significant cross wind with gusts of up to 29 knots (54 km/h; 33 mph).

The 29 December accident was the second runway overrun involving a Red Wings operated Tu-204-100B in nine days. A Moscow Vnukovo to Novosibirsk flight on 20 December 2012 (operated by a Tupolev Tu-204 registered as RA-64049) overran runway 25 at Tolmachevo Airport by 350 metres (1,150 ft) when its brakes failed on landing. All 70 people on board survived uninjured and damage to the aircraft was minor. As a result of that incident, on 24 December the Federal Air Transport Agency of Russia (Rosaviatsia) issued a mandatory Airworthiness Directive requiring Red Wings and all other operators of the Tu-204 to inspect and apply extra lubrication to the braking system drive mechanism limit switches, located on the main landing shock absorber, "before next departure".

On 28 December, the day before the fatal Vnukovo accident, Rosaviatsia also formally notified Tupolev, the aircraft's manufacturer, that malfunctioning brakes had caused the Red Wings Tu-204 overrun accident at Novosibirsk. On 30 December Rosaviatsia chief Alexander Neradko announced that a preliminary examination of the aircraft's flight data recorder indicated that the flight had touched down in the proper landing area but, as in the 20 December incident in Novosibirsk, the braking system on RA-64047 appeared to have failed in the fatal Moscow overrun accident as well.

=== Aircraft ===
The aircraft, a Tupolev Tu-204-100B (reg RA-64047, c/n 1450743164047, s/n 047) was built in 2008. The airframe had accumulated 8,672 flight hours in 2,482 cycles.

=== Crew ===
The captain, 58-year-old Gennady Dmitrievich Shmelev, had more than 14,500 hours of total flying experience, of which more than 3,000 hours were on the Tu-204. The first officer, 52-year-old Evgeny Ivanovich Astashenkov had more than 10,000 flight hours, including more than 500 hours on the Tu-204. The flight engineer, 54-year-old Igor Nikolaevich Fisenko, also had more than 10,000 flight hours, with nearly 1,600 of them on the Tu-204. The accident was the first hull loss for Red Wings Airlines since its founding in 1999.

== Accident ==
External videos
- Dashcam footage of the incident on YouTube

The approach was carried out on runway 19 at Vnukovo Airport, which was 3,060 metres (10,039 ft) long. The captain was in control of the aircraft during approach. The approach was performed without significant deviations from the glide path, and the aircraft passed over the start of the runway at a height of 15 metres (49 ft) and an airspeed of 260 kilometres per hour (140 kn; 160 mph). Five seconds after the throttle had been retarded to idle, the aircraft touched down, between 900 and 1,000 metres (2,953 and 3,281 ft) along the runway, at a speed of 230 kilometres per hour (120 kn; 140 mph). At the moment of touchdown only the left side gear was in contact with the runway. During the landing the right side wind gusts reached up to 11.5 metres per second (22.4 kn; 41 km/h; 26 mph). About 10 seconds elapsed from the moment of passing the 4-metre (13 ft) altitude point and the touchdown. Three seconds after touchdown the nose gear strut was compressed. At this stage the right gear strut compression signal had not yet been sensed. Almost simultaneously with the touchdown of the nose landing gear, the crew put the engines into reverse thrust and applied the mechanical brakes.

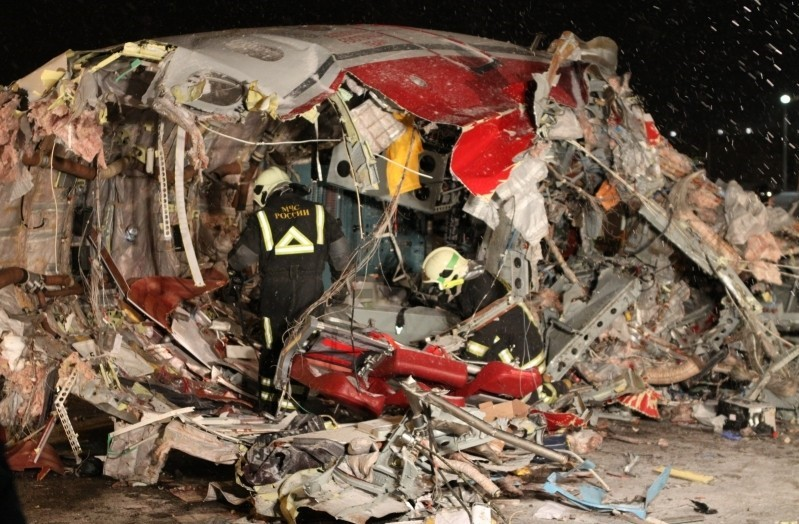
Wreckage from another view

As a safety feature, both sets of main landing gear were required to be compressed simultaneously before the thrust reversers could deploy. Because there was no compression of the right landing gear, the reversers were never deployed, and moving the controls to the Maximum Reverse position caused an increase of forward thrust in both engines. In addition to the lack of reverse thrust, the airbrakes and spoilers failed to activate automatically, and the crew did not attempt to activate them manually. The minimum airspeed which the aircraft reached, 7–8 seconds after landing, was 200 to 205 kilometres per hour (108 to 111 kn; 124 to 127 mph), after which the speed began to increase to a maximum of 240 kilometres per hour (130 kn; 150 mph). The increased speed, along with rolling of the aircraft from side to side, alternately compressed the left and right landing gear struts. The crew attempted to activate the reversers a second time, but because there was no time when both landing gear struts were compressed, the attempt was unsuccessful. The wheel brakes were also ineffective, as they also required compression of the gear strut to function correctly.

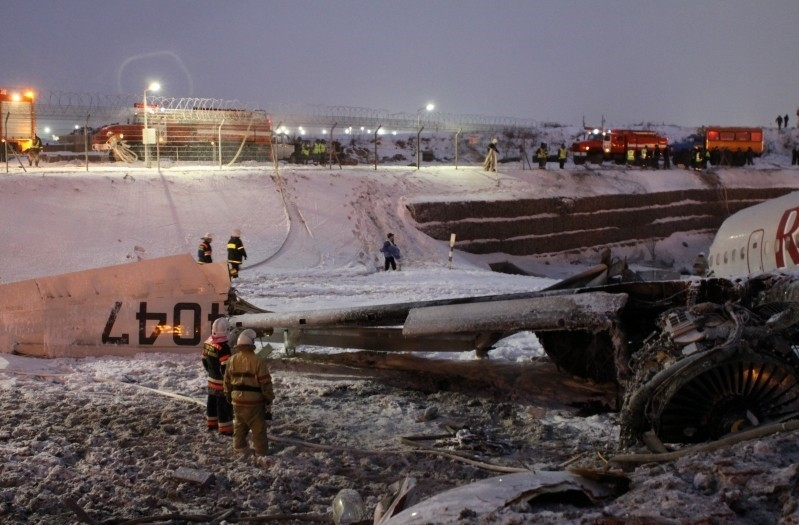
Rescuers at the crash site

The aircraft skidded off the runway 32 seconds after landing at an air speed of about 215 kilometres per hour (116 kn; 134 mph). In the process of skidding off, at the command of the captain, the flight engineer switched off the engines by means of the emergency shut down. The plane continued to roll out of the runway, slowly decelerating due to road bumps and snow cover. At this point, both landing gear struts were compressed, which led to the activation of airbrakes and spoilers. The plane collided with the slope of a ravine at a ground speed of about 190 kilometres per hour (100 kn; 120 mph).

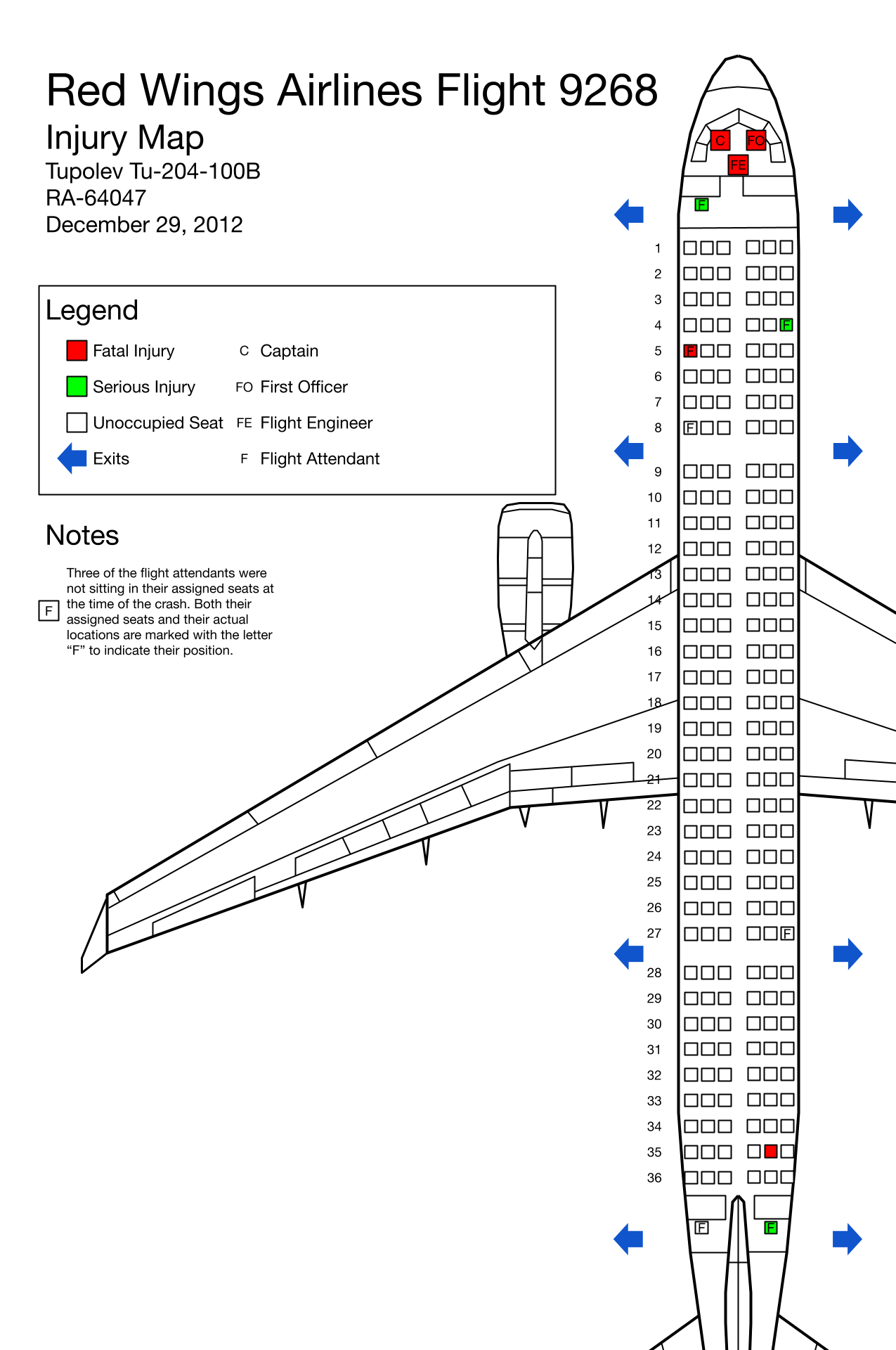
Injury map of the crash of Red Wings Airlines Flight 9268, showing the locations of crewmembers and the severity of their injuries.

There were five fatalities. At 16:35 local time (12:35 GMT), the aircraft overran runway 19, splitting into three sections upon running into a ditch between the airport fence and the M3 highway, with parts of it scattering onto the road; included were parts of the aircraft's interior, seat assemblies and two of the aircraft's wheels hitting the underside of the runway's approach lighting system scaffolding and impacting an automobile. The crash was recorded on video by a dashcam mounted on another automobile. The cockpit section of the aircraft became detached from the rest of the airframe.

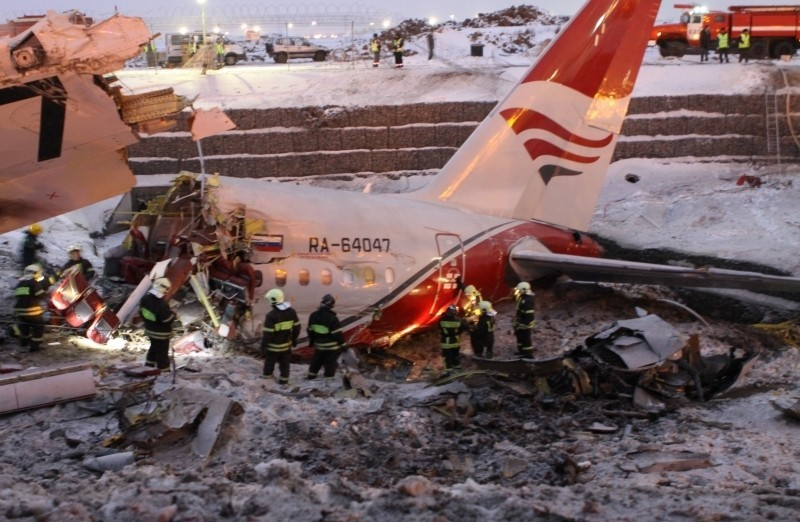
Rescuers next to the tail section

According to the official report, the cockpit crew consisting of the pilot, first officer, and flight engineer, were killed on impact. One of the flight attendants was ejected from the aircraft and landed on an adjacent road; she was confirmed to be dead in an ambulance transporting her to the hospital. Three of the remaining flight attendants, including the chief flight attendant, managed to escape the plane through cracks in the fuselage, and were transported to the hospital in serious condition. The remaining flight attendant was pulled out of the wreckage by first responders and transported to the hospital, where she later succumbed to her injuries.

== See also ==
- TAM Airlines Flight 3054
- Garuda Indonesia Flight 200
- Malaysia Airlines Flight 2133
- TACA Flight 390
