= Red Wings Airlines =

Russian airline based in Moscow

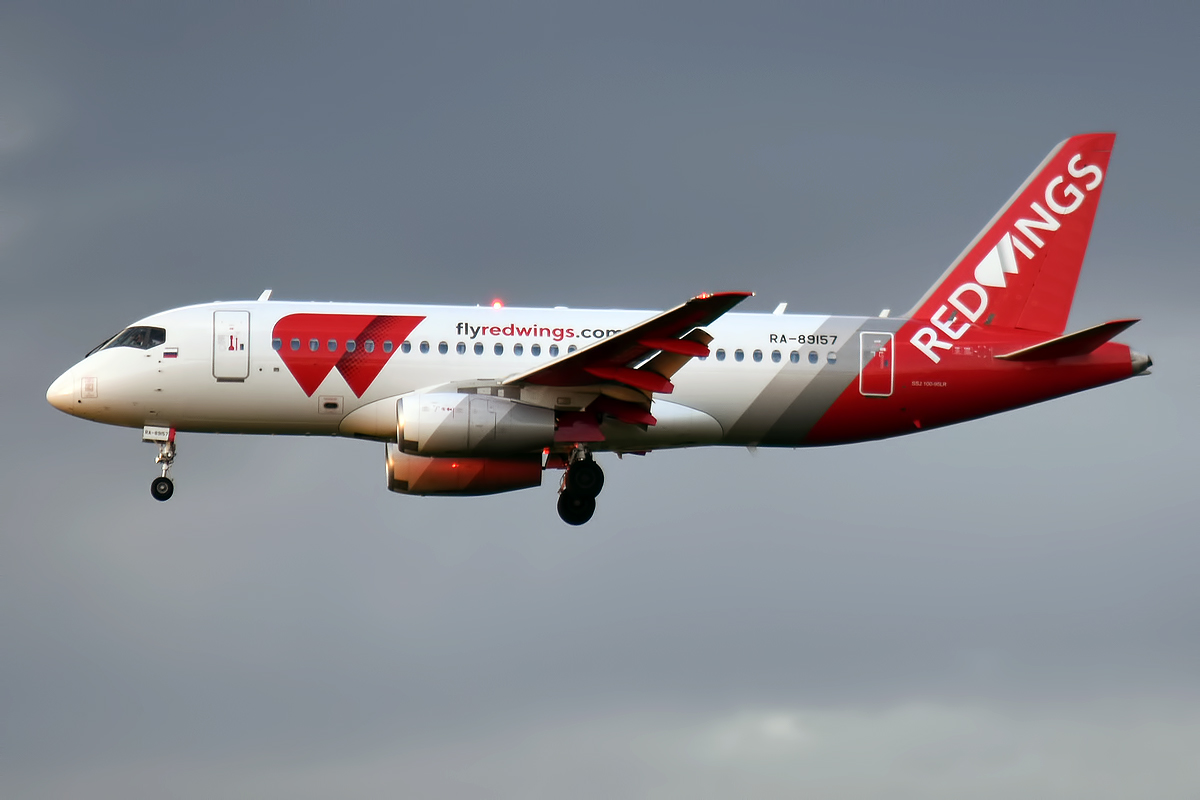
- Red Wings Airlines Sukhoi Superjet 100
IATA	ICAO	Call sign
WZ	RWZ	RED WINGS
- Founded: 1999; 27 years ago
- Hubs: Chelyabinsk; Moscow-Zhukovsky; Omsk; St Petersburg; Yekaterinburg
- Subsidiaries: Sky Gates Airlines
- Fleet size: 31
- Destinations: 28
- Headquarters: Moscow, Russia
- Key people: Yevgeny Solodilin (CEO)
- Website: www.flyredwings.com

Red Wings Airlines is a Russian airline based in Zhukovsky International Airport. The airline provides both scheduled passenger and cargo services.

== History ==
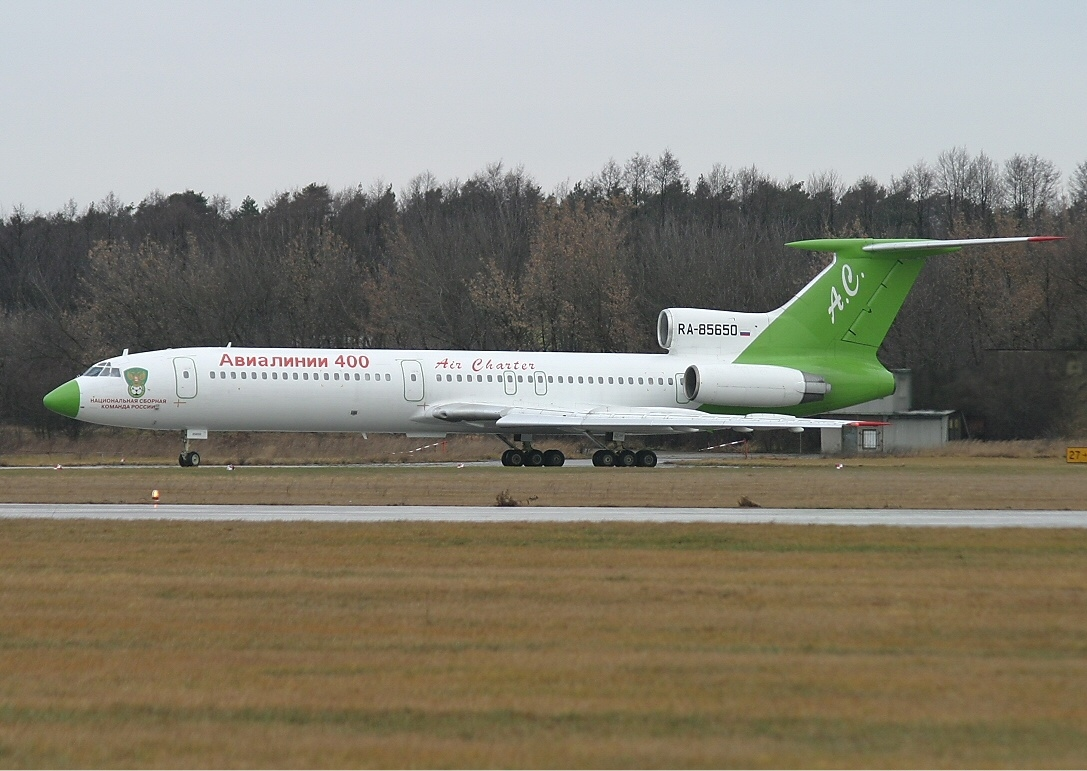
A former Airline 400 Tupolev Tu-154 at Pardubice Airport in 2005

A former Red Wings logo used from 2008 to 2018

Red Wings was founded in 1999 under the name VARZ-400, after the Russian acronym of the Vnukovo Avia Repair Factory. It was renamed Airlines 400 in 2001, before adopting its current name in 2007.

The airline was owned by Russian tycoon Alexander Lebedev, who wanted to create a discount airline using modern Russian Tupolev Tu-204-100B 210-passenger twin-jet airliners, both newly built and used. The company had a fleet of ten Tu-204-100Bs (an eleventh Tu-204 was written off after crashing at Vnukovo International Airport on 29 December 2012), and had also sought to acquire Airbus A320s and possibly Airbus A321s to complement its Tu-204 fleet.

Lebedev also owned 49% of German charter airline Blue Wings, which was to become Red Wings's sister company. However, on 13 January 2010, Blue Wings ceased all operations and filed for bankruptcy, citing the 2008 financial crisis for a reduction in investors.

After the crash of Flight 9268 in Vnukovo, Russian aviation authorities initiated an emergency check of airline operational activities and fleet maintenance, resulting in the revocation of the carrier's AOC, effective on 4 February 2013. The airline had ceased all operations the day before and owner Alexander Lebedev announced that no return to operation was planned.

On 4 April 2013, NRC sold Red Wings Airlines Group "Guta" for one symbolic ruble (in this case, leased aircraft remained with the lessor NRC-owned company Ilyushin Finance). The new owners of Red Wings planned to increase the fleet to 10–15 aircraft; the airline was only going to buy Russian aircraft. On 25 April 2013, Red Wings announced it would be headed by Sergey Belov—the previous CEO of the airline "Russia". On 18 June 2013, the Federal Air Transport Agency renewed Red Wings' commercial passenger and cargo transportation certificate. On 22 June, the airline resumed charter flights, and on 12 July, scheduled flights from Moscow.

To increase their business power, Red Wings and Nordavia decided to merge. But while the process was initiated, a date for finalization of the merger or clarification of the two airlines' future business relationship and branding identities was never announced. The plan called for Airbus A320 aircraft initially ordered by Nordavia to be delivered to Red Wings. The new brand name was to be announced after the completion of the merger.

In 2016 Ilyushin Finance acquired a 74% stake in Red Wings. In 2017 this was increased to 100%.

On 20 September 2018, Red Wings announced its re-branding; the first aircraft to arrive with the updated livery was to be the Airbus A321, set to arrive by the end of 2018.

In August 2021, Red Wings signed their first personal services 20-year contract to the value of 500 million dollars with United Aircraft Corporation in order to technical support of SSJ100 engines. Before, only the engine's manufacturer, PowerJet company, could carry the right to sign any technical support contracts with air companies directly.

In 2022, Red Wings was added to the List of airlines banned in the European Union along with all other Russian airlines due to the Russian invasion of Ukraine.

== Destinations ==
Country	City	Airport	Notes	Ref
Armenia	Yerevan	Zvartnots International Airport		
Azerbaijan	Baku	Heydar Aliyev International Airport		
Bahrain	Manama	Bahrain International Airport		
Belarus	Minsk	Minsk National Airport		
China	Beijing	Beijing Capital International Airport	Terminated	
China	Hangzhou	Hangzhou Xiaoshan International Airport	Terminated	
China	Ürümqi	Ürümqi Tianshan International Airport	Begins 1 July 2026	
Egypt	Hurghada	Hurghada International Airport	Seasonal charter	
Egypt	Sharm El Sheikh	Sharm El Sheikh International Airport	Seasonal charter	
France	Belfort	Belfort–Fontaine Aerodrome	Airport closed	
Georgia	Batumi	Alexander Kartveli Batumi International Airport		
Georgia	Tbilisi	Shota Rustaveli Tbilisi International Airport		
Israel	Tel Aviv	David Ben Gurion Airport		
Kazakhstan	Almaty	Almaty International Airport		
Kazakhstan	Aqtau	Aqtau International Airport		
Kazakhstan	Astana	Nursultan Nazarbayev International Airport		
Kyrgyzstan	Bishkek	Manas International Airport		
Kyrgyzstan	Osh	Osh Airport		
Russia	Abakan	Abakan International Airport		
Russia	Astrakhan	Narimanovo Airport		
Russia	Barnaul	Barnaul Airport		
Russia	Chelyabinsk	Kurchatov Chelyabinsk International Airport	Hub	
Russia	Chita	Chita-Kadala International Airport		
Russia	Gorno-Altaysk	Gorno-Altaysk Airport		
Russia	Grozny	Kadyrov Grozny International Airport		
Russia	Irkutsk	International Airport Irkutsk		
Russia	Izhevsk	Izhevsk Airport		
Russia	Kazan	Ğabdulla Tuqay Kazan International Airport		
Russia	Kemerovo	Kemerovo International Airport		
Russia	Kirovsk / Apatity	Kirovsk-Apatity Airport	Begins 25 December 2026	
Russia	Krasnodar	Krasnodar International Airport		
Russia	Makhachkala	Uytash Airport		
Russia	Moscow	Moscow Domodedovo Airport	Terminated	
Russia	Moscow	Sheremetyevo International Airport	Terminated	
Russia	Moscow	Vnukovo International Airport	Terminated	
Russia	Moscow	Zhukovsky International Airport	Hub	
Russia	Murmansk	Murmansk Airport		
Russia	Nizhnekamsk	Begishevo Airport		
Russia	Nizhnevartovsk	Nizhnevartovsk Airport		
Russia	Nizhny Novgorod	Strigino International Airport		
Russia	Norilsk	Alykel International Airport		
Russia	Novosibirsk	Tolmachevo Airport	Seasonal	
Russia	Novokuznetsk	Spichenkovo Airport		
Russia	Novy Urengoy	Novy Urengoy Airport		
Russia	Omsk	Omsk Central Airport	Focus city	
Russia	Orenburg	Orenburg Airport		
Russia	Perm	Bolshoye Savino Airport		
Russia	Saint Petersburg	Pulkovo Airport	Focus city	
Russia	Samara	Kurumoch International Airport		
Russia	Saransk	Saransk Airport		
Russia	Saratov	Saratov Gagarin Airport		
Russia	Sochi	Sochi International Airport		
Russia	Stavropol	Stavropol Shpakovskoye Airport		
Russia	Surgut	Farman Salmanov Surgut Airport		
Russia	Tyumen	Roshchino International Airport		
Russia	Ufa	Mostay Kərim Ufa International Airport		
Russia	Ulan-Ude	Baikal International Airport		
Russia	Ulyanovsk	Ulyanovsk Baratayevka Airport		
Russia	Volgograd	Volgograd International Airport		
Russia	Yaroslavl	Golden Ring Yaroslavl International Airport		
Russia	Yekaterinburg	Koltsovo International Airport	Hub	
Sri Lanka	Hambantota	Mattala Rajapaksa International Airport	Seasonal charter	
Tajikistan	Dushanbe	Dushanbe International Airport	Begins 6 June 2026	
Thailand	Phuket	Phuket International Airport	Terminated	
Turkey	Antalya	Antalya Airport	Seasonal	
Turkey	Istanbul	Istanbul Airport		
United Arab Emirates	Abu Dhabi	Zayed International Airport		
United Arab Emirates	Dubai	Al Maktoum International Airport		
Uzbekistan	Bukhara	Bukhara International Airport		
Uzbekistan	Namangan	Namangan Airport		
Uzbekistan	Tashkent	Tashkent International Airport		
Uzbekistan	Urgench	Urgench International Airport		
Vietnam	Nha Trang	Cam Ranh International Airport		

=== Codeshare agreements ===
Currently, Red Wings Airlines has codeshare agreements with the following airlines:

- Air France
- Belavia
- Smartavia
- Ural Airlines

== Fleet ==
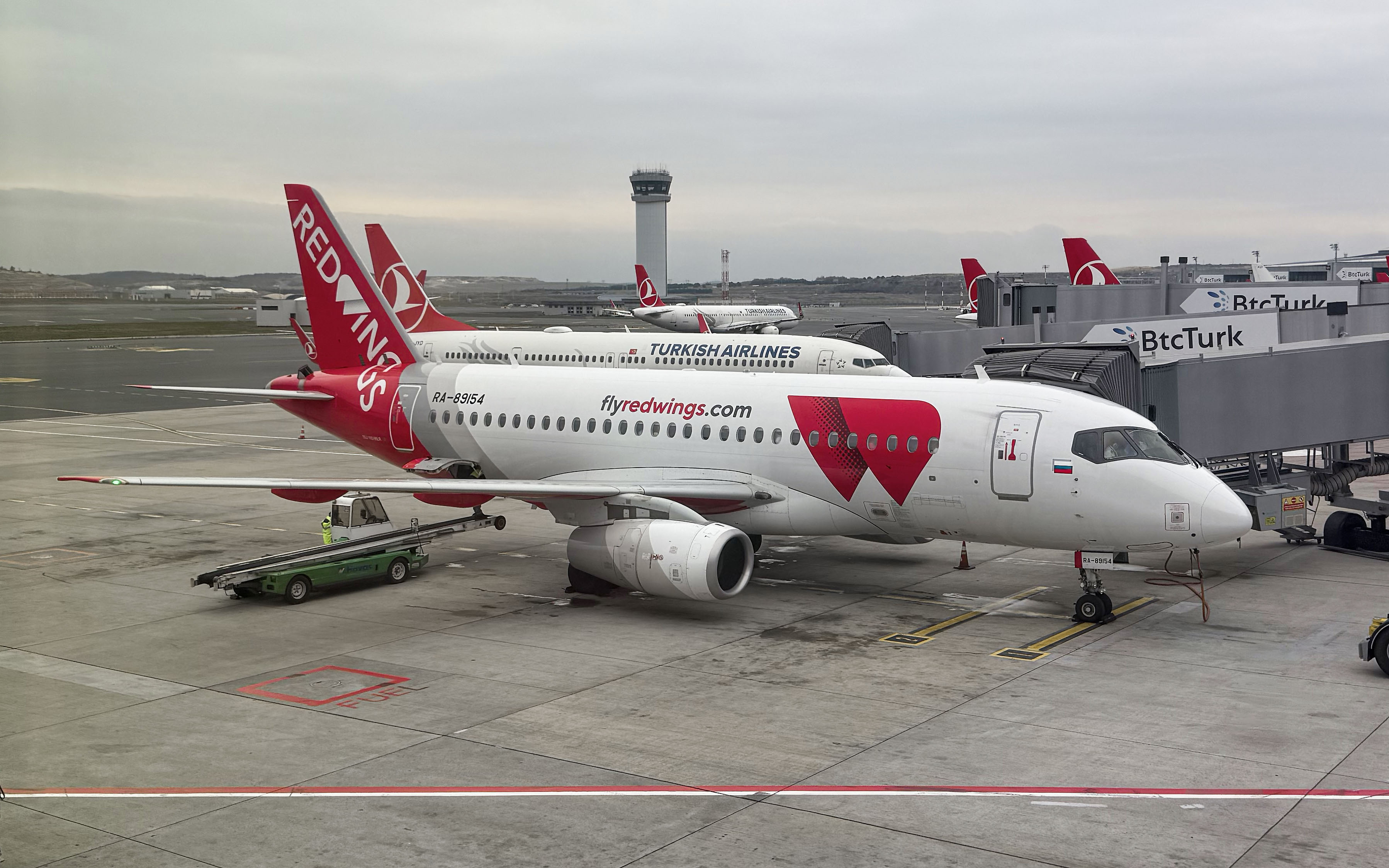
Red Wings Airlines Sukhoi Superjet 100-95LR

=== Current fleet ===
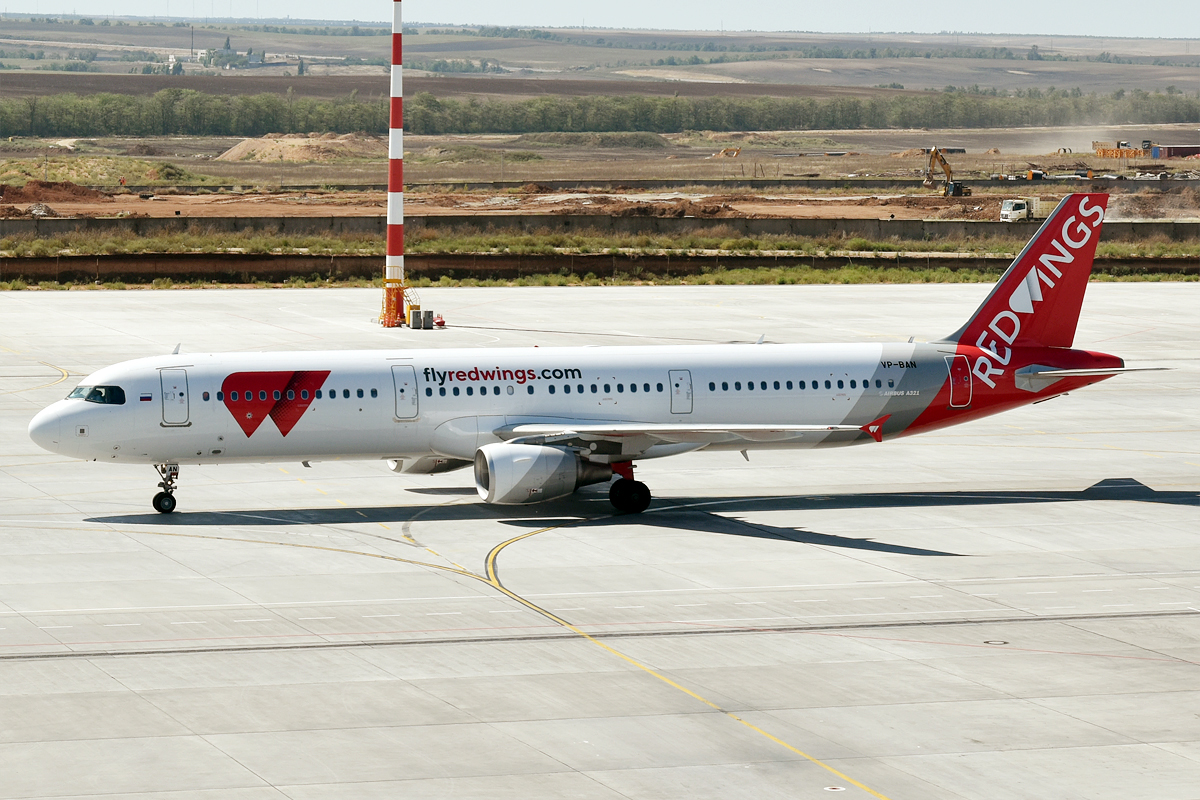
Former Red Wings Airlines Airbus A321-200 wearing the new livery

As of August 2025, Red Wings Airlines operates the following aircraft:

Red Wings Airlines fleet
Aircraft	In service	Orders	Passengers			Notes
Aircraft	In service	Orders	J	Y	Total	Notes
Boeing 777-200ER	3	—	—	412	412	
Sukhoi Superjet 100-95	22	38	—	100	100	Overall order of 60 aircraft.
Tupolev Tu-214	5	—	—	194	194	Used for international flights.
Yakovlev MC-21-300	—	16	TBA			
Total	27	54				

=== Retired fleet ===
Red Wings Airlines previously also operated the following types of aircraft:

- Airbus A320-200
- Airbus A321-200
- Ilyushin Il-76
- Tupolev Tu-154
- Tupolev Tu-204-100

== Accidents and incidents ==
- On 29 December 2012, at 16:35 local time (12:35 GMT), Red Wings Airlines Flight 9268, a Tupolev Tu-204-100В (Registration: RA-64047, c/n: 1450743164047, s/n: 047, built: 2008) crashed on landing after overrunning Runway 19 at Vnukovo International Airport (VKO) following a non-revenue repositioning flight originating from Pardubice Airport, Czech Republic. The aircraft broke up and came to a stop on elevated highway M3 about 400 metres (1,312 ft; 437 yd) past the runway's end. There were eight crew members on board of whom five were killed and the other three seriously injured. The fatal Vnukovo accident was the second runway overrun incident involving a Red Wings operated Tu-204-100B in nine days following a Moscow Vnukovo to Novosibirsk flight on 20 December 2012 that overran Runway 25 at Tolmachevo Airport by 351 metres (1,150 feet) into an open field. Initial flight data recorder readouts indicate that brake failure, as well as engine thrust reverser issues, were major contributing causes in both overruns resulting in the issuance of additional airworthiness directives. Russia's Interstate Aviation Committee (IAC) later determined that, as in the precursor non-fatal overrun incident in Novosibirsk, the fatal Moscow accident was caused by a failure of the compression switches in two of the three landing gear assemblies to close on touchdown thus causing the engine thrust reverser shells to fail to deploy.
- On 22 August 2018, one of the Aviadvigatel PS-90 engines of a Red Wings Tu-204 operating flight WZ808 from Ufa to Sochi experienced an engine surge during takeoff from Ufa International Airport and subsequently caught fire. The crew did not receive any fire indications, the automatic fire suppression system did not work, and the manual fire suppression failed to fully extinguish the flames. Emergency services put out the fire after landing while the passengers were evacuated through the right-hand emergency doors via slides. There were no injuries. A Rosaviatsia (Russia's Civil Aviation Authority) commission has been set up to investigate the occurrence.

== See also ==
- List of airlines of Russia
