= Batumi International Airport =

International airport in Batumi, Georgia

Alexander Kartveli Batumi International Airport ბათუმის ალექსანდრე ქართველის სახელობის საერთაშორისო აეროპორტი

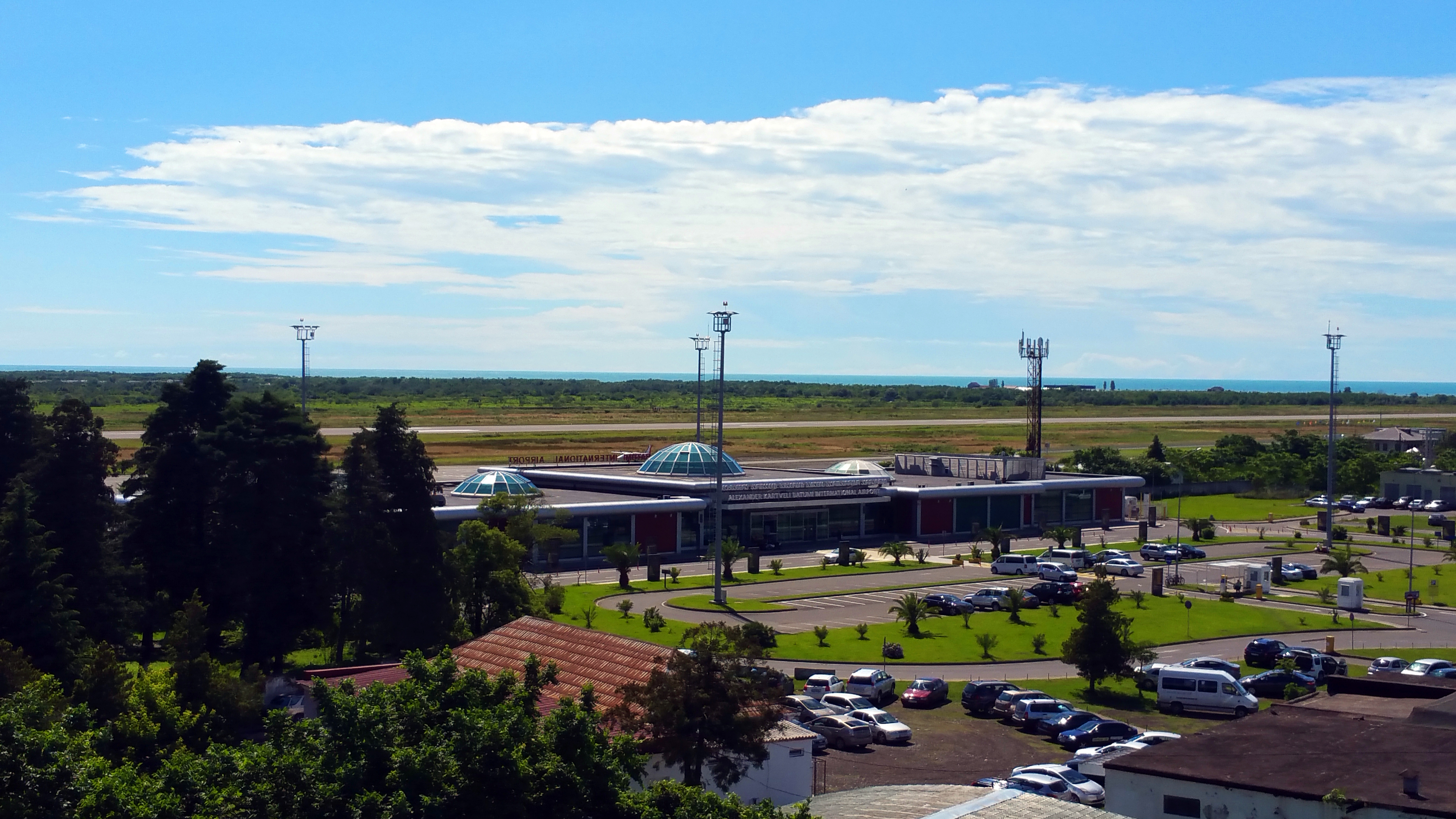
- IATA: BUS; ICAO: UGSB

Summary
- Airport type: Public
- Operator: TAV Airports Holding
- Serves: Batumi, Georgia
- Location: Batumi, Adjara, Georgia
- Focus city for: Georgian Airways
- Elevation AMSL: 37 ft (11 m)
- Coordinates: 41°36′37″N 41°35′58″E
- Website: www.batumiairport.com

Map
- Location of Batumi Airport BUS (Turkey) BUS (Black Sea)

Runways
Direction	Length		Surface
Direction	m	ft	Surface
12/30	2,500	8,202	Asphalt

Statistics (2025)
- Passengers: 1,230,200
- Passenger change 22-23: ▲0.75%
- Source: Civil Aviation Agency of Georgia

Alexander Kartveli Batumi International Airport (IATA: BUS, ICAO: UGSB) is an international airport located 2 km (1.2 mi) south of Batumi, a city on the Black Sea coast and capital of Adjara, an autonomous republic in southwest Georgia. The airport is 20 km (12 mi) northeast of Hopa, Turkey, and serves as a domestic and international airport for Georgia. The airport is named after Alexander Kartveli, an aeronautical engineer and aviation pioneer. A sculpture dedicated to Fadiko Gogitidze, Adjara's first woman pilot, is at the entrance.

== Overview ==
Batumi is one of three international airports in operation in Georgia (along with Tbilisi International Airport serving the Georgian capital and Kutaisi International Airport in Georgia's second largest city Kutaisi). The new airport terminal has been in operation since 26 May 2007. With a total area of 4,256 square metres (45,810 sq ft), it is capable of handling 600,000 passengers a year.

On 25 October 2000, Il-18 aircraft with registration number RA-74295 crashed into the Mtirala mountain northeast of Batumi during the final approach to the airport. The plane was returning personnel and their relatives to the Russian 12th Military Base in Batumi. All 84 people (73 passengers and 11 crew members) on board were killed. The cause of the disaster was the navigation error of the pilots and the lack of control on the part of air traffic control services.

Batumi International Airport has noted a significant growth in the number of passengers since its renovation in 2007. In 2011, the airport handled 134,000 passengers, an increase of 51% over the previous year.

In 2019, the terminal was expanded because the existing capacities were no longer sufficient. The work was completed in spring 2021. The airport's area was doubled to 8000 square meters, which allows the handling of 1,200,000 passengers a year. Part of the work was to expand the number of bus gates, the check-in area, and passport control counters as well as the expansion of duty-free areas and the car park. Additionally, the luggage handling area was partially expanded, where an automatic conveyor system was introduced and an additional one luggage carousel was installed. A total of US$17 million were invested.

== Airlines and destinations ==
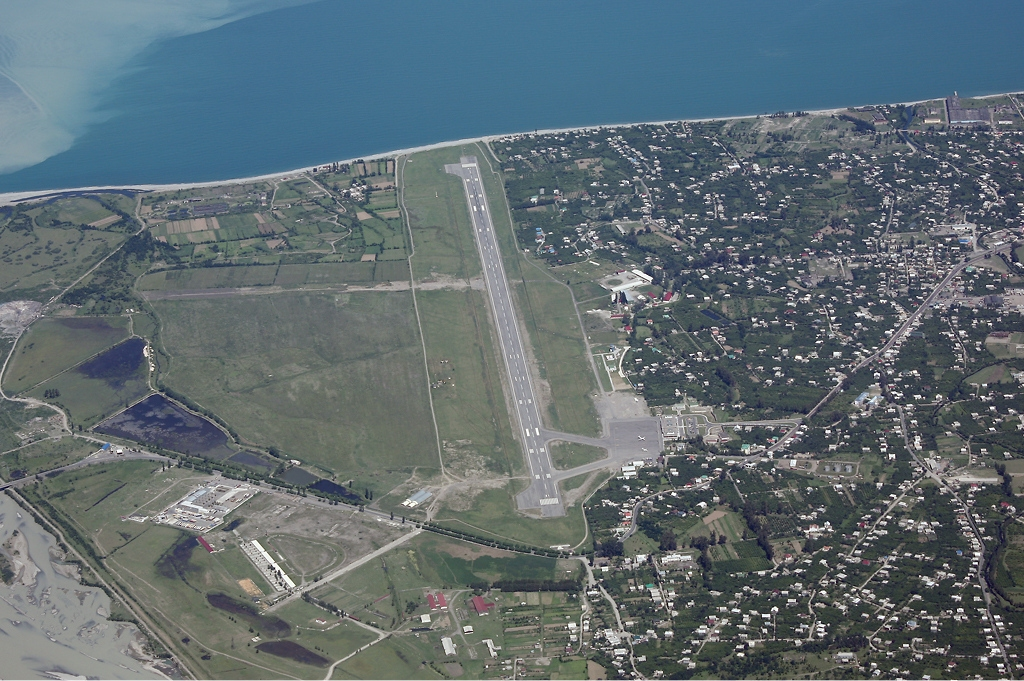
Batumi Airport

Airlines	Destinations
Air Astana	Seasonal: Almaty, Astana
Air Samarkand	Seasonal charter: Tashkent
airBaltic	Seasonal: Riga
arkia	Seasonal: Tel Aviv
Azerbaijan Airlines	Baku
azimuth	Mineralnye Vody, Moscow–Vnukovo, Sochi
Belavia	Minsk
Flyadeal	Seasonal: Riyadh
FlyArystan	Seasonal: Almaty, Aqtau, Astana, Atyrau, Şymkent
Flydubai	Seasonal: Dubai–International
Fly Khiva	Tashkent
Flynas	Seasonal: Dammam, Jeddah, Riyadh
Georgian Airways	Moscow-Vnukovo, Tbilisi
GetJet Airlines	Seasonal charter: Vilnius
Iran Aseman Airlines	Seasonal: Tehran–Imam Khomeini (suspended)
Israir	Seasonal: Tel Aviv
Jazeera Airways	Seasonal: Kuwait City
Jordan Aviation	Amman
Pegasus Airlines	Istanbul–Sabiha Gökçen
Red Wings Airlines	Seasonal: Chelyabinsk, Kazan, Krasnodar, Moscow–Zhukovsky, Nizhny Novgorod, Novosibirsk, Orenburg, Perm, Saint Petersburg, Samara, Saratov, Sochi, Tyumen, Ufa, Volgograd, Yekaterinburg
Saudia	Seasonal: Riyadh
SCAT Airlines	Seasonal: Astana
Sundor	Seasonal: Tel Aviv
Turkish Airlines	Istanbul
Uzbekistan Airways	Seasonal: Tashkent
Vanilla Sky Airlines	Natakhtari
Varesh Airlines	Tehran–Imam Khomeini (suspended)

== Statistics ==
Annual passenger statistics Batumi International Airport
Year	Passengers	Change
2025	1,230,200	▲29.3%
2024	951,766	▲53%
2023	621,514	▲0.75%
2022	616,885	▲19.5%
2021	516,017	▲906%
2020	51,412	▼91.8%
2019	624,178	▲4.2%
2018	598,891	▲20.8%
2017	495,668	▲58.7%
2016	312,343	▲37.9%
2015	226,476	▲5.9%
2014	213,439	▲2.2%
2013	208,977	▲24.0%
2012	168,510	▲25.9%
2011	133,852	▲51.1%
2010	88,562	▲92.3%
2009	46,044	▼28.8%
2008	64,656	▲67.4%

=== Most popular routes in summer 2021 ===
Country	Destination	Airport	Weekly flights	Airlines
Ukraine	Kyiv	Boryspil International Airport, Kyiv International Airport	21	Bees Airline (7 weekly) SkyUp Airlines (7 weekly) Yanair (7 weekly)
Israel	Tel Aviv	Ben Gurion Airport	15	Israir (10 weekly); Arkia (3 weekly); El Al/Sundor (2 weekly) Georgian Airways (2 weekly)
Turkey	Istanbul	Istanbul Airport, Sabiha Gökçen International Airport	10	Turkish Airlines (7 weekly) Pegasus Airlines (3 weekly)
Belarus	Minsk	Minsk National Airport	4	Belavia (4 weekly)
Saudi Arabia	Riyadh	King Khalid International Airport	4	Flynas (4 weekly)

== See also ==
- List of the busiest airports in the former Soviet Union
- List of airports in Georgia
- Transport in Georgia
