= Queen Tamar Airport =

Queen Tamar Airport თამარ მეფის აეროპორტი
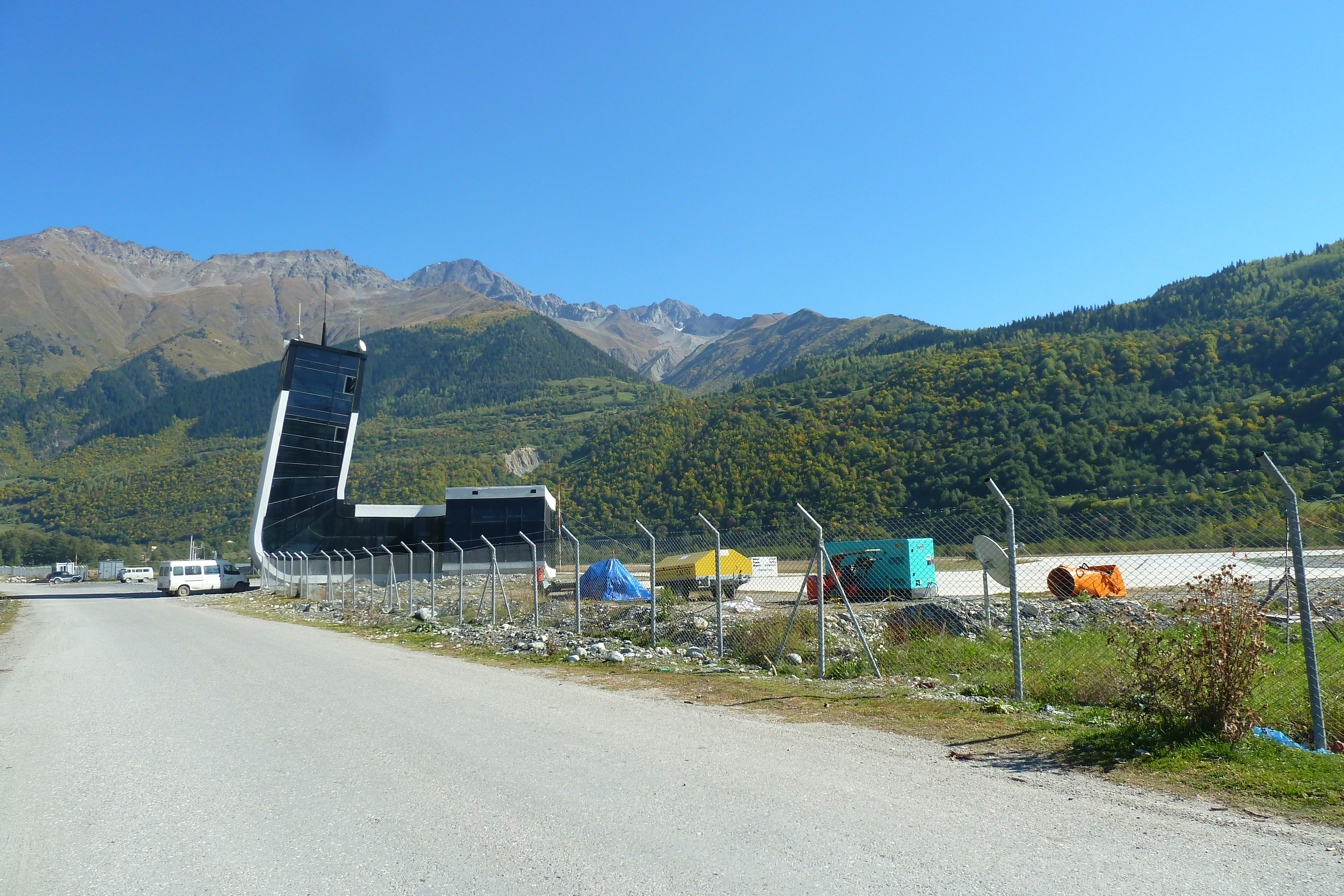
- Airport main building
- IATA: none; ICAO: UGMS

Summary
- Airport type: Public
- Owner: United Airports of Georgia LLC
- Operator: United Airports of Georgia LLC
- Serves: Mestia, Svaneti, Georgia
- Elevation AMSL: 4,778 ft (1,456 m)
- Coordinates: 43°03′30″N 042°45′02″E

Map
- Location of airport in Georgia Queen Tamar Airport (Samegrelo-Zemo Svaneti)

Runways
Direction	Length		Surface
Direction	m	ft	Surface
02/20	1,158	3,800	Concrete
- Source: Georgian Civil Aviation Agency (GCAA), Skyvector.com

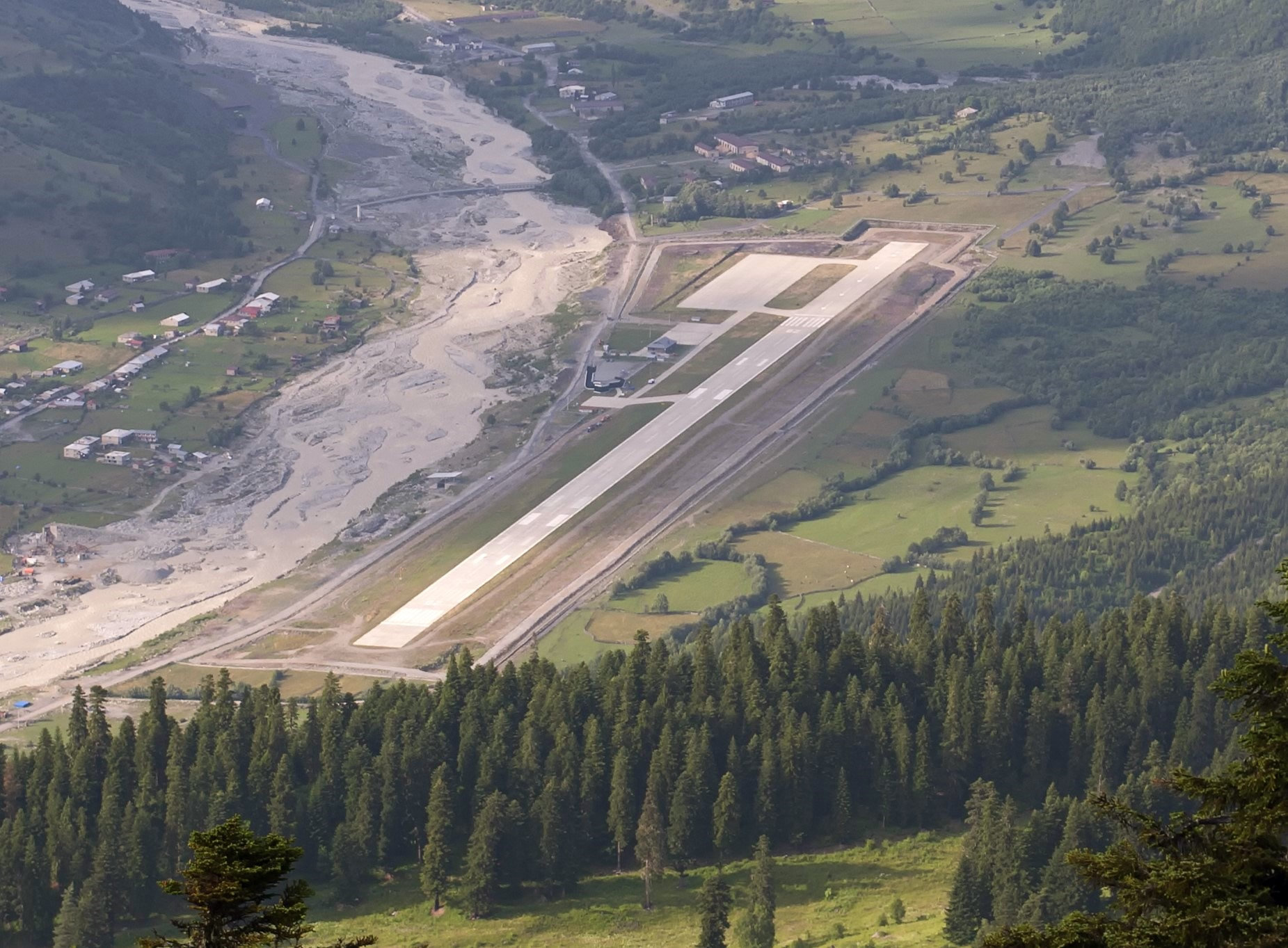
Queen Tamar Airport runway

Queen Tamar Airport (ICAO: UGMS), or Mestia Airport, is a small domestic airport serving Mestia, a town in Samegrelo-Zemo Svaneti, Georgia. Since its reopening in 2010 it is named after the medieval "queen king" regnant Tamar of Georgia, who is a popular symbol in Georgian popular culture. The airport is owned and operated by United Airports of Georgia, a state-owned company. The airport is located at 1,456 m (4,777 ft) above sea level in the valley near Mestia, wedged between the mountains of the Greater Caucasus.

== General ==
Mestia Airport is a small regional airport, with a paved runway of 1,156 m (3,793 ft), which is served only domestically. It is located 1,456 m (4,777 ft) above sea level in the valley of the Mestiachala River, wedged between the mountains of the Greater Caucasus, with peaks above 3,000 m (9,800 ft). It serves not only summer tourism to the mountains of Svanetia, but also skiresorts Hatsvali and Tetnuldi. Due to the remoteness of the inaccessible mountain valley, Mestia was served by air in Soviet times, which was not without risks. Two Antonov An-2 biplanes crashed near Mestia.

Upon reopening, Kenn Borek Air from Canada, a company specializing in flights in difficult conditions, started scheduled flights between Mestia and Natakhtari (Tbilisi) with a DHC-6 Twin Otter. This contract was terminated in mid-2013. It took until mid-2014 until flights to Mestia were resumed when Service Air, a Georgian company which owns and operates the Natakhtari airfield, won a contract for the route. Its subsidiary Vanilla Sky Airlines services the route since with a 19-seat Let L-410. In spring 2016, the Kutaisi - Mestia route followed, shortly after Hungarian Wizz Air committed to creating a hub out of Kutaisi airport, guaranteeing the flow of tourists.

Due to the outbreak of the corona pandemic, air traffic in Georgia was completely shut down by the government in 2020, except for mandated flights. While international traffic was not opened until February 2021, domestic traffic resumed in the summer of 2020, and in November 2021 the connection with Kutaisi was restored. Compared with Georgia's international airports, the passenger flow through Mestia was impacted relatively mild, and picked up again in 2021 in sold numbers.

== History ==
After the 2003 Rose Revolution of 2003, when tourism became a focal point of policy, Mestia was quickly identified to be upgraded with a new airport including a paved runway. In December 2010, the Queen Tamar Airport was opened by President Mikheil Saakashvili, who flew in with his government for a cabinet meeting. The airport building, designed by the German architect Jürgen Mayer, is a modern take on the Svan towers, the medieval defensive towers that are characteristic of the region.

== Airlines and destinations ==
Airlines	Destinations
Vanilla Sky Airlines	Kutaisi, Natakhtari

== Statistics ==
Annual passenger statistics Queen Tamar Mestia Airport
Year	Passengers	Change
2023	10,217	▲8.89%
2022	9,385	▲82.6%
2021	5,141	▲62.3%
2020	3,165	▼63.3%
2019	8,625	▲25.8%
2018	6,858	▼5.5%
2017	7,256	▲72.2%
2016	4,214	▼5.6%
2015	4,465	▲232.5%
2014	1,343	▲151.8%
2013	885	▼69.7%
2012	2,922	▼36.2%
2011	4,580	▲10,178%
2010	45	Steady

== See also ==
- List of airports in Georgia
- Transport in Georgia
- Georgian Civil Aviation Administration
