= Blue Wings =

German charter airline

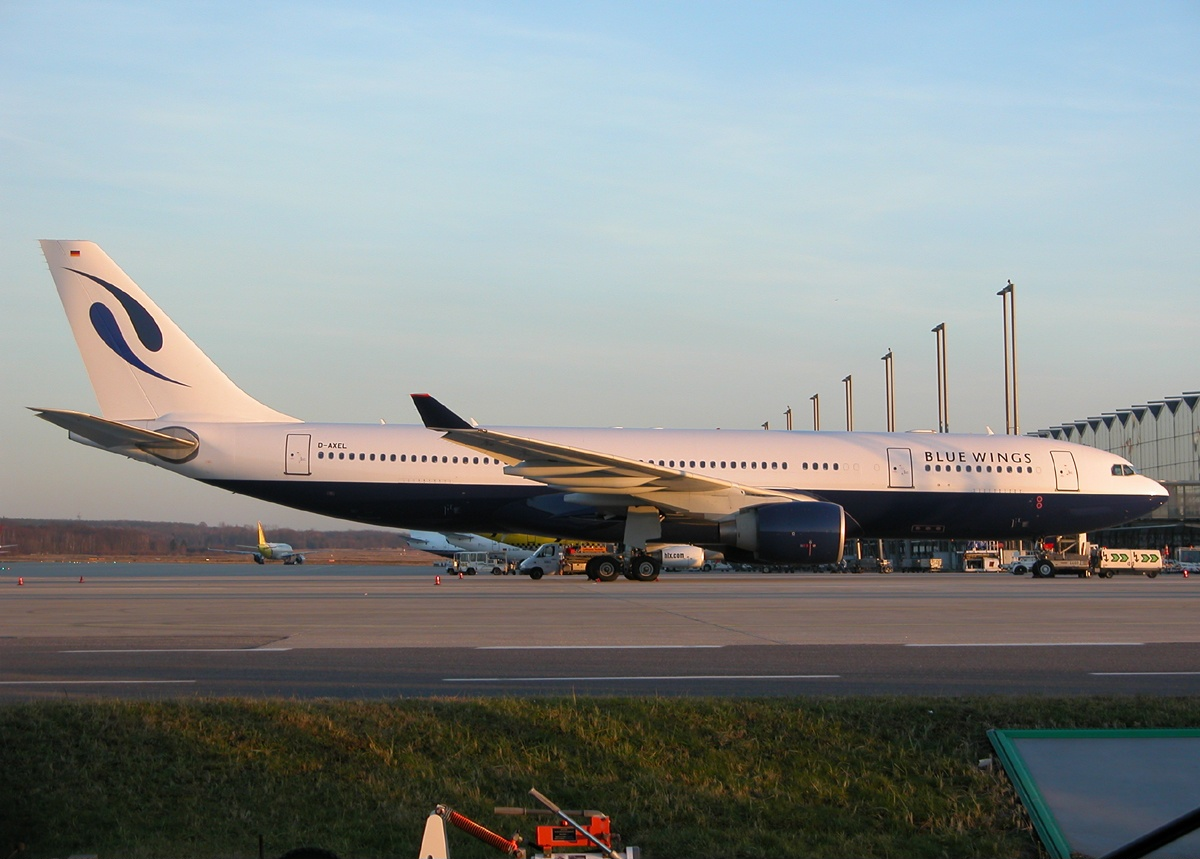
- Airbus A330-200
IATA	ICAO	Call sign
QW	BWG	BLUE WINGS
- Founded: 2002
- Commenced operations: July 2002
- Ceased operations: January 13, 2010
- Operating bases: Düsseldorf Airport
- Fleet size: 11 (at time of closure)
- Destinations: 23
- Headquarters: Bocholt, Germany
- Key people: Udo Stern (MD)
- Website: bluewings.com

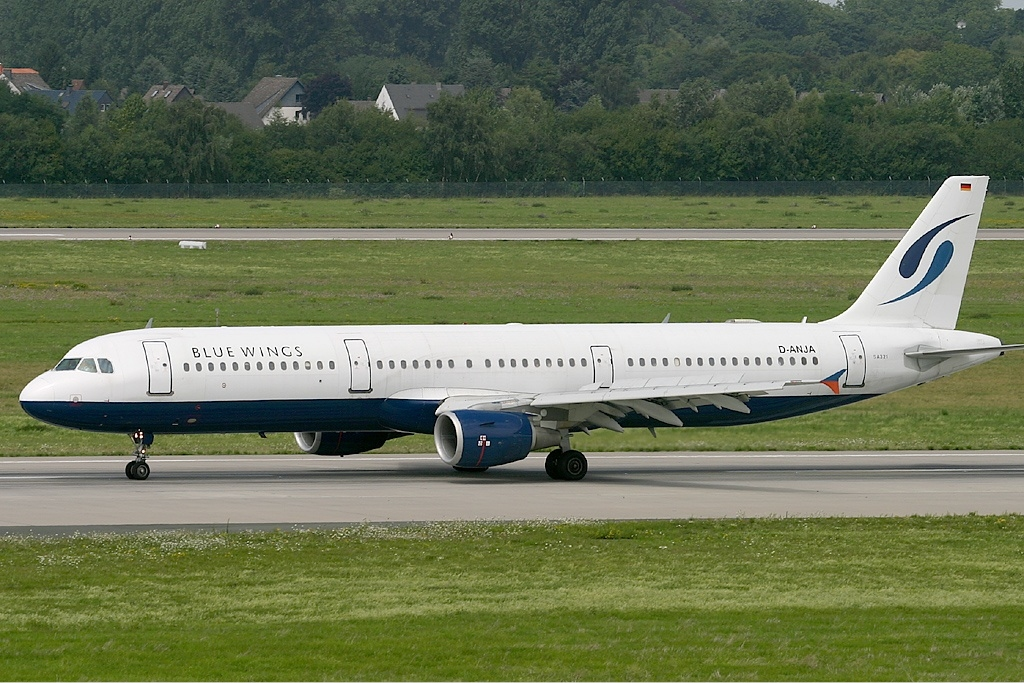
An Airbus A321-111 at Düsseldorf Airport in 2005

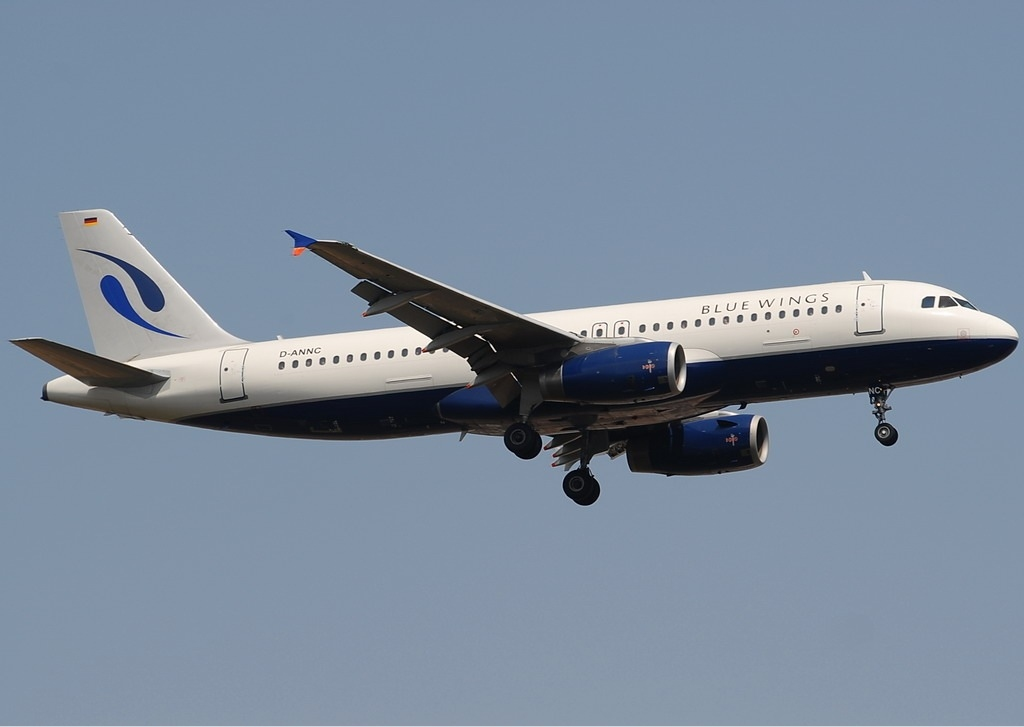
An Airbus A320-200

Blue Wings AG was a charter airline based in Germany, focusing on serving Turkey, the Middle East and Russia from its base at Düsseldorf Airport.

== History ==
=== Early years and growth ===
Blue Wings was established in 2002, received the AOC on 27 June 2003 and started operations in July of the same year. It initially operated charter flights from Düsseldorf using a wet-leased Airbus A320. In June 2006, the Russian National Reserve Corporation (NRC) acquired a 48 percent shareholding through its Zürich based subsidiary Alpstream AG, which was intended to lead to a close co-operation between Blue Wings and Red Wings Airlines, also belonging to NRC.

On 6 October 2006, Blue Wings signed a purchase agreement with JetBlue Airways for five second-hand Airbus A320-200 aircraft. For cost-saving reasons, Blue Wings adopted a nearly identical color scheme compared to JetBlue. On 17 October of the same year, another order - this time for 16 new Airbus A320 and 4 Airbus A321 was signed, and subsequently announced during the Farnborough Air Show of the same year.

=== Development since 2009 and closure ===
On 30 December 2009, the Federal Office for Civil Aviation of Germany revoked the operating license of Blue Wings because of solvency fears, forcing the airline to shut down all operations. Blue Wings was saved for once on 23 April of the same year, when it was announced that Elite Aviation, a VIP charter airline from Abu Dhabi, had signed a charter agreement with Blue Wings. Subsequently, the license was reinstated on 5 May.

On 5 August 2009, it was announced that Iraqi Airways, Iraq's national airline, had signed a contract to lease three Blue Wings Airbus A320-232, which were used on European routes.

On 13 January 2010, Blue Wings ceased all operations, filing bankruptcy due to the Great Recession and the 2008 financial crisis, which reduced investor interest. The airline's corporate head office was located in Düsseldorf, at Düsseldorf Airport. Before closure it was in Terminal A. Previously it was in Hangar 8 at the same airport.

== Destinations ==
Blue Wings operated the following international scheduled destinations in November 2011:

=== Africa ===
Morocco

- Marrakesh - Marrakesh Menara Airport
- Agadir - Agadir–Al Massira Airport

Tunisia

- Monastir - Habib Bourguiba International Airport

=== Asia ===
Kazakhstan

- Karaganda - Sary-Arka Airport

Lebanon

- Beirut - Beirut Rafic Hariri International Airport

=== Europe ===
Germany

- Berlin - Berlin Schönefeld Airport
- Düsseldorf - Düsseldorf Airport Base
- Hamburg - Hamburg Airport focus city
- Karlsruhe/Baden-Baden - Karlsruhe/Baden-Baden Airport
- Leipzig/Halle - Leipzig/Halle Airport
- Münster/Osnabrück - Münster Osnabrück Airport

Greece

- Athens - Athens International Airport
- Crete - Heraklion International Airport
- Corfu - Corfu International Airport

Italy

- Alghero - Alghero-Fertilia Airport
- Rome - Rome Ciampino Airport

Portugal

- Faro - Faro Airport
- Madeira - Funchal Airport

Russia

- Moscow - Sheremetyevo International Airport

Spain

- Barcelona - El Prat Airport
- Gran Canaria - Gran Canaria Airport
- Tenerife - Reina Sofia Airport
- Palma de Mallorca - Palma de Mallorca Airport
- Ibiza - Ibiza Airport
- Málaga - Málaga Airport

Ukraine

- Kyiv - Boryspil International Airport

Turkey

- Trabzon - Trabzon Airport
- İzmir - Adnan Menderes International Airport
- Antalya - Antalya Airport
- Samsun - Çarşamba Airport

== Fleet ==
The Blue Wings fleet consisted of the following aircraft (at 25 November 2012):

Aircraft type	Total	Orders	Passengers (Business/Economy)
Airbus A320-200	11	16	150 (12/138); 168 (0/168)
Airbus A321-200	3	3	207
Tupolev Tu-204	—	5	TBA
Total	14	24	
