= Transport in Georgia (country) =

Transportation networks and infrastructure in Georgia

Transportation in Georgia consists of rail, road, air, and maritime networks that support domestic mobility and regional transit between Eastern Europe, the Caucasus, and Central Asia.

== Railways ==
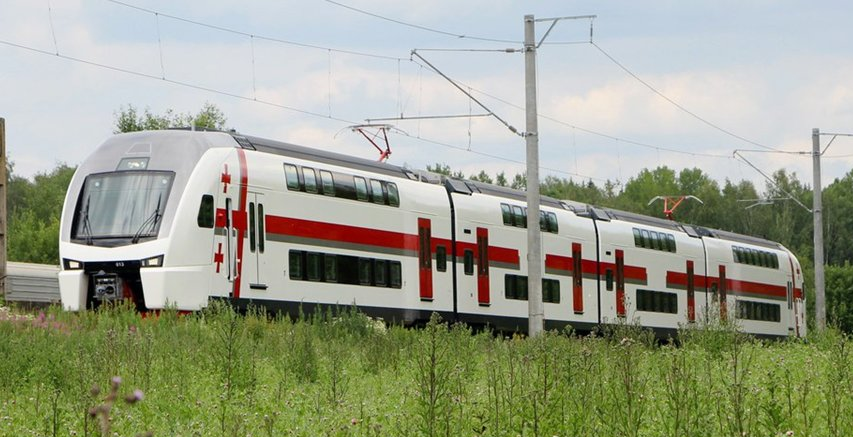
Stadler KISS GRS «Eurasia» passenger train

total: 1,683 km in common carrier service; does not include industrial lines
broad gauge: 1,583 km of 1,520 mm (4 ft 11 27/32 in) gauge (1993)
narrow gauge: 100 km of 914 mm (3 ft) gauge.

City with metro system: Tbilisi (see Tbilisi Metro).

- In April 2005, an agreement was signed to build a railway from Turkey through Georgia to Azerbaijan (see Kars Baku Tbilisi railway line). The line under construction is using Standard gauge until Akhalkalaki. There will be axle change station for wagons to proceed with broad gauge to Baku.
- In August 2007, Georgia handed over the management rights of the state-owned Georgian Railway company to the U.K.-based company Parkfield Investment for 89 years.

=== Railway links with adjacent countries ===
- Russia - yes - 1,520 mm (4 ft 11 27/32 in) - via the breakaway Autonomous Republic of Abkhazia - closed for political reasons.
- Azerbaijan - yes - 1,520 mm (4 ft 11 27/32 in).
- Armenia - yes 1,520 mm (4 ft 11 27/32 in)
- Turkey - yes - break-of-gauge with through 1,435 mm (4 ft 8 1/2 in) (Standard Gauge).

=== 2007 ===
- February 7 - agreement signed for Kars-Tbilisi-Baku railway

=== Towns served by rail ===
- Poti - port
- Batumi - port
- Kutaisi
- Akhaltsike

== Highways ==
The total length of the road network is approximately 21,000 kilometres (13,000 mi) kilometers (2020), divided over roughly 1,600 kilometres (990 mi) of international trunk roads, 7,000 kilometres (4,300 mi) of domestic main roads and some 12,400 kilometres (7,700 mi) local roads. Only a limited number of kilometers are express roads or motorways which are in good condition. The quality of the other roads varies greatly.

National roads of Georgia

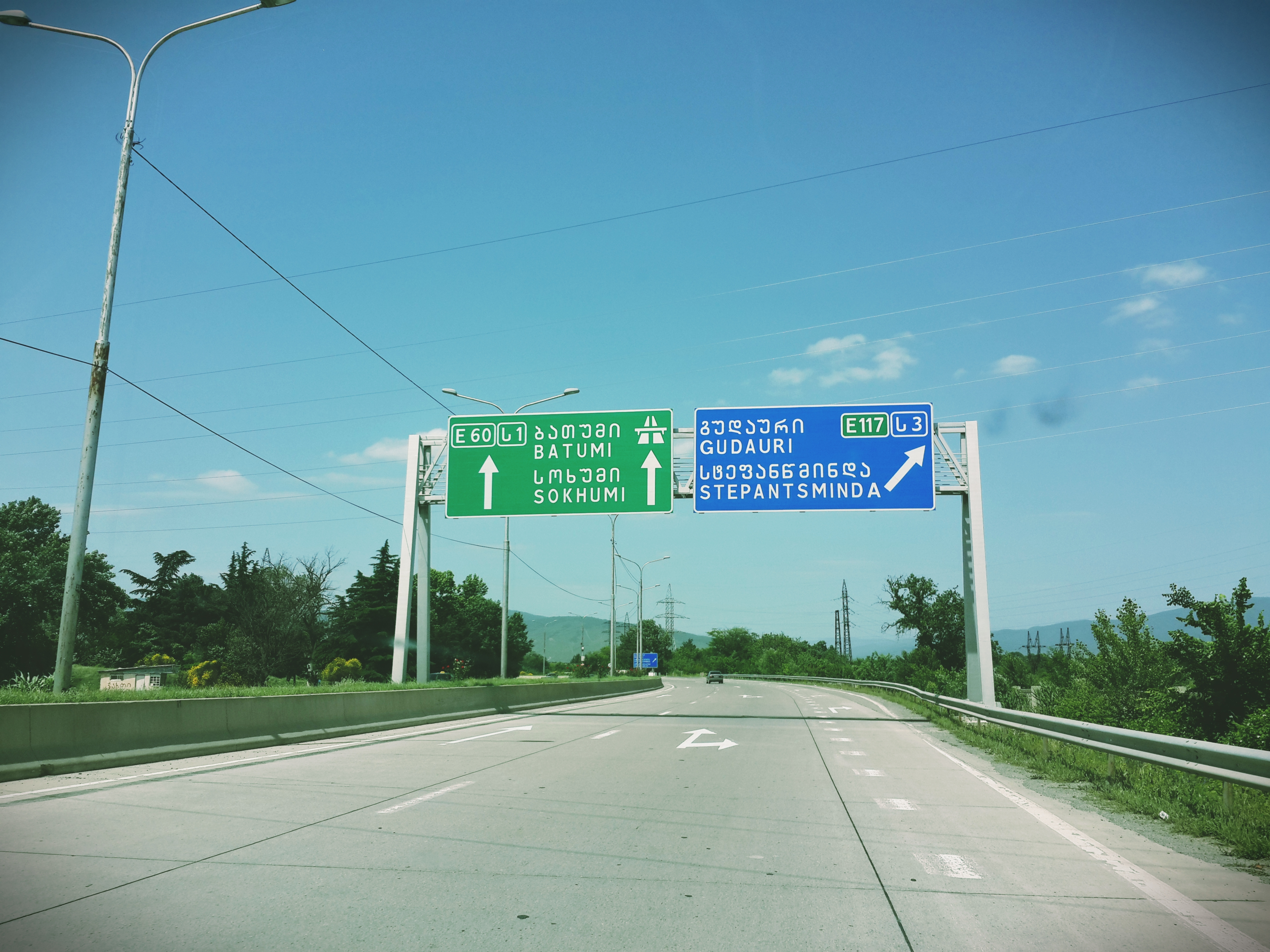
S1 Highway

Main roads
Number	E Route	name	Length (km)	Notes
S1 highway (Georgia)	European route E60 European route E97 European route E117	Tbilisi - Senaki - Leselidze	544	
S2 highway (Georgia)	European route E60 European route E70	Senaki - Poti - Sarpi	119	
S3 highway (Georgia)	European route E117	Mtskheta - Stepantsminda - Larsi	139	
S4 highway (Georgia)	European route E60 European route E117	Tbilisi - Red Bridge	57	
S5 highway (Georgia)		Tbilisi – Bakurtsikhe – Lagodekhi	160	
S6 highway (Georgia)	European route E117	Ponichala – Marneuli – Guguti	98	
S7 highway (Georgia)	European route E001	Marneuli – Sadakhlo	34	
S8 highway (Georgia)	European route E691	Khashuri – Akhaltsikhe – Vale	97	
S9 highway (Georgia)	European route E60 European route E117	Tbilisi Bypass	49	
S10 highway (Georgia)		Gori – Tskhinvali – Gupta – Java – Roki	92,5	
S11 highway (Georgia)	European route E691	Akhaltsikhe – Ninotsminda	112	
S12 highway (Georgia)	European route E692	Samtredia - Lanchkhuti - Grigoleti	57	
S13 highway (Georgia)		Akhalkalaki - Kartsakhi	36,5	
This table is based on the 2017 list of roads of the Government of Georgia.

=== Motorways ===
Georgia has a limited multilane expressroad/motorway system, that is under development. In 2021 these sections are:

- S1 highway Mukhatgverdi (Tbilisi West) - Surami 113 km (70 mi)
- S1 highway Argveta - Samtredia 58 km (36 mi)
- S4 highway Ponichala (Tbilisi) - Rustavi 9 km (5.6 mi)
- S12 highway Japana - Lanchkhuti 14 km (8.7 mi)

Additionally, the S2 highway has 32 km (20 mi) limited access two-lane freeway (Kobuleti Bypass).

== Pipelines ==
Crude oil 370 km; refined products 300 km; natural gas 440 km (1992)

== Ports and harbours ==
Batumi, Poti, Sokhumi, Kulevi Oil Terminal

== Merchant marine ==
total: 17 ships (with a volume of 1,000 gross tonnage (GT) or over) totaling 103,080 GT/158,803 tonnes deadweight (DWT)
ships by type: cargo ship 10, chemical tanker 1, petroleum tanker 6 (1999 est.)

== Airports ==
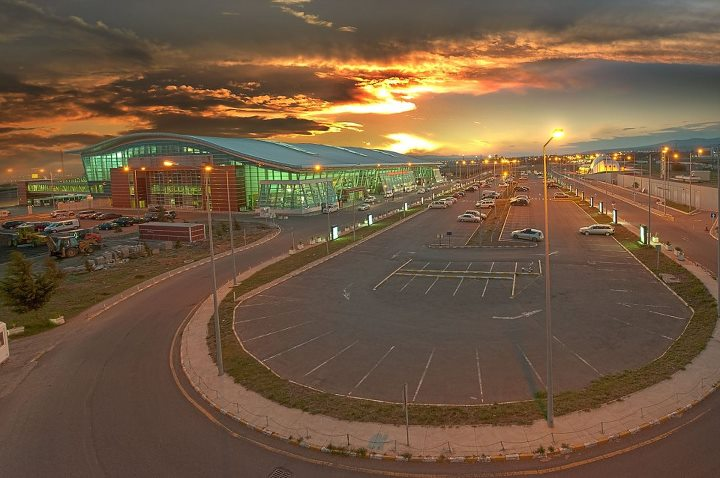
Shota Rustaveli Airport

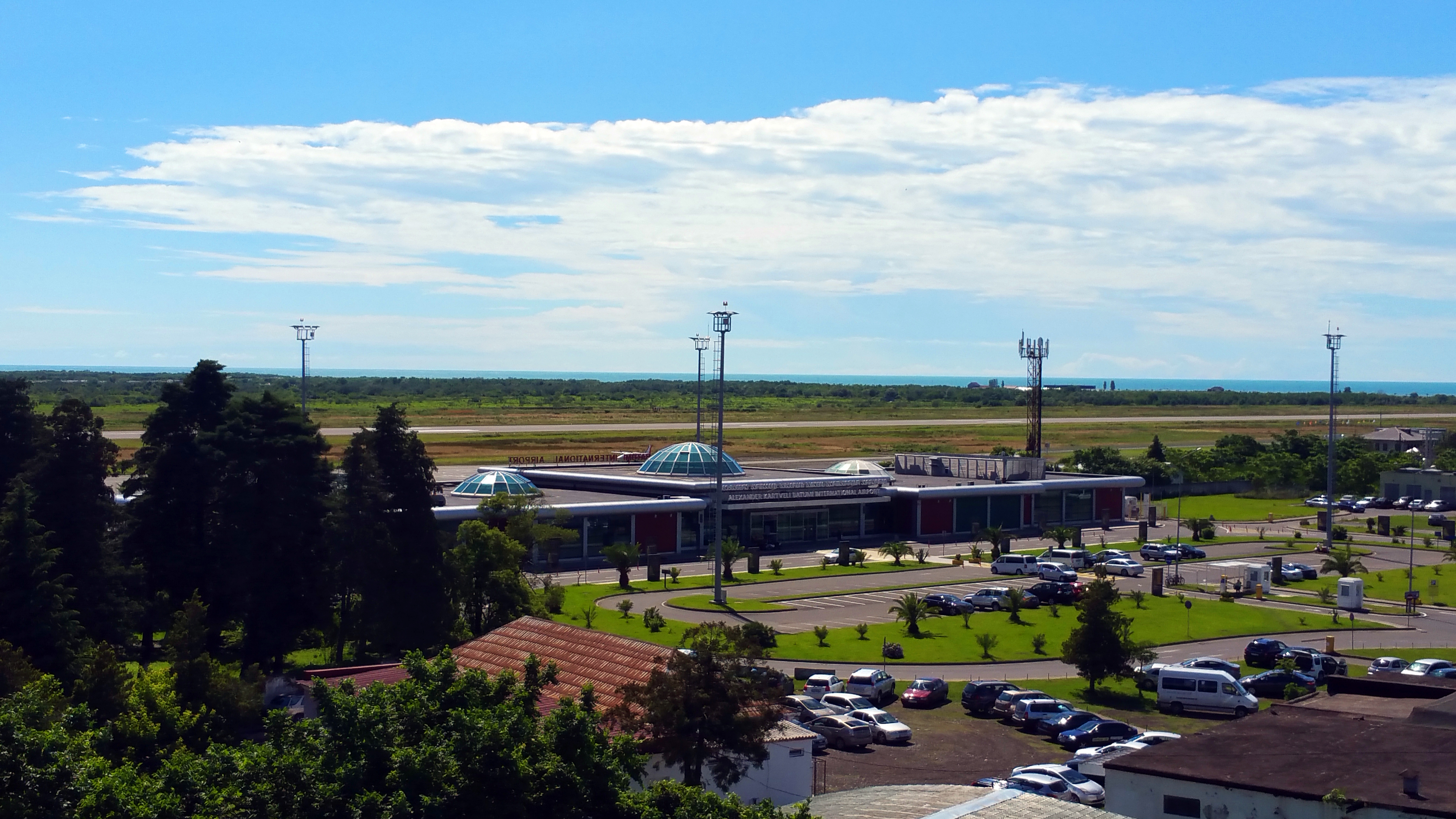
Alexander Kartveli Airport

28 (1994 est.) In February 2007 a brand new, modern and fully equipped international Airport was inaugurated in Tbilisi.

- Tbilisi - Shota Rustaveli Airport
- Batumi - Alexander Kartveli Airport
- Kutaisi - David The Builder Airport
- Mestia - Queen Tamar Airport
- Ambrolauri - Ambrolauri Airport
- Poti - Poti International Airport

=== Airports - with paved runways ===
total: 14
over 3,047 m: 1
2,438 to 3,047 m: 7
1,524 to 2,437 m: 4
914 to 1,523 m: 1
under 914 m: 1 (1994 est.)

=== Airports - with unpaved runways ===
total: 14
over 3,047 m: 1
2,438 to 3,047 m: 1
1,524 to 2,437 m: 1
914 to 1,523 m: 5
under 914 m: 6 (1994 est.)

== See also ==
- Georgia
- List of Tbilisi metro stations
