= Kutaisi International Airport =

International airport in Georgia

Kutaisi International Airport ქუთაისის საერთაშორისო აეროპორტი

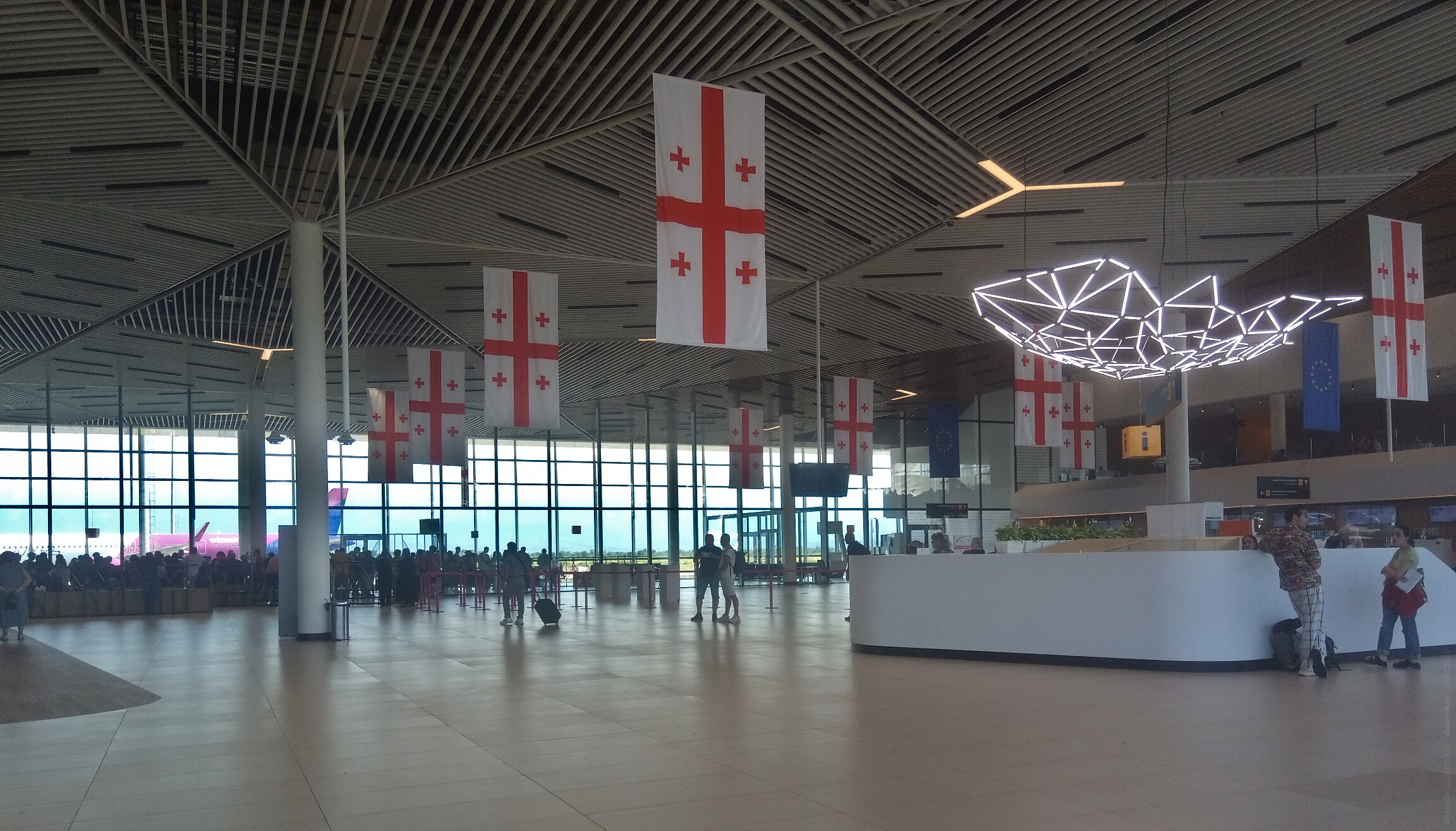
- IATA: KUT; ICAO: UGKO

Summary
- Airport type: Public
- Owner/Operator: United Airports of Georgia
- Serves: Kutaisi, Georgia
- Focus city for: Wizz Air
- Elevation AMSL: 223 ft (68 m)
- Coordinates: 42°10′35″N 042°28′57″E
- Website: kutaisi.aero

Map
- Location of airport in Georgia KUT (Imereti) KUT (Asia)

Runways
Direction	Length		Surface
Direction	m	ft	Surface
07/25	2,500	8,202	Asphalt

Statistics (2024)
- Passengers: 1,722,809
- Passenger change 23-24: ▲3%
- Source: DAFIF

Kutaisi International Airport (IATA: KUT, ICAO: UGKO), also known as David the Builder Kutaisi International Airport, is an airport located 14 km (8.7 mi) west of Kutaisi, the third largest city in the country of Georgia and capital of the western region of Imereti. It is the second busiest airport in Georgia with 1.7 million passengers passing through it in 2024, a 3% increase compared with the previous year. The airport is operated by United Airports of Georgia, a state-owned company.

== History ==
Exterior of Kutaisi International Airport

The airport was closed for renovation in November 2011. Its reopening ceremony was held on 27 September 2012. The ceremony was attended by President of Georgia Mikheil Saakashvili, Prime Minister of Hungary, Viktor Orbán and Wizz Air CEO József Váradi.

To prepare for the commissioning of the airport and training of staff, the French company Vinci Airports was contracted. There is one duty-free shop and two coffee shops operating at the airport. The airport is currently connected to scheduled buses operated by Georgian Bus and Omnibus Express, with services to Kutaisi, Tbilisi and Batumi after each arrival. The airport terminal is located next to the main road between Kutaisi and Batumi, so it is also possible to transfer to those cities by marshrutka.

The priority of Kutaisi airport is to attract low-cost airlines. A significant growth in the number of passengers was noted soon after the reopening of the airport in 2012, mainly due to Wizz Air's operations linking Kutaisi with European airports. The airport reported 187,939 passengers in 2013. In February 2016, Wizz Air announced a new base at Kutaisi Airport and was planning to add a second base in 2018.

A plan to build a railway station 2 kilometres from the airport to connect the airport to Tbilisi, Batumi and any other cities of Georgia served by Georgian Railways was announced in 2018. In April 2022, the modernization of the Kopitnari station was finished. Currently, Tbilisi-Batumi trains stop at the Kopitnari station as well.

== Airlines and destinations ==
Airlines	Destinations
Azimuth	Moscow–Vnukovo
Belavia	Minsk
Electra Airways	Seasonal charter: Katowice
FlyArystan	Almaty, Aqtau, Astana, Atyrau; Seasonal: Şymkent
Pegasus Airlines	Istanbul–Sabiha Gökçen
Red Wings Airlines	Moscow–Zhukovsky
Smartwings	Seasonal charter: Warsaw–Chopin
Vanilla Sky Airlines	Mestia
Wizz Air	Athens, Barcelona, Beauvais, Berlin, Bratislava, Budapest, Charleroi, Dortmund, Hahn, Hamburg, Katowice, Larnaca, Lyon, Madrid, Memmingen, Milan–Malpensa, Poznań, Prague, Rome–Ciampino, Thessaloniki, Venice-Marco Polo, Vilnius, Warsaw–Chopin, Wrocław

== Statistics ==
Terminal exterior at night

Check-in desk

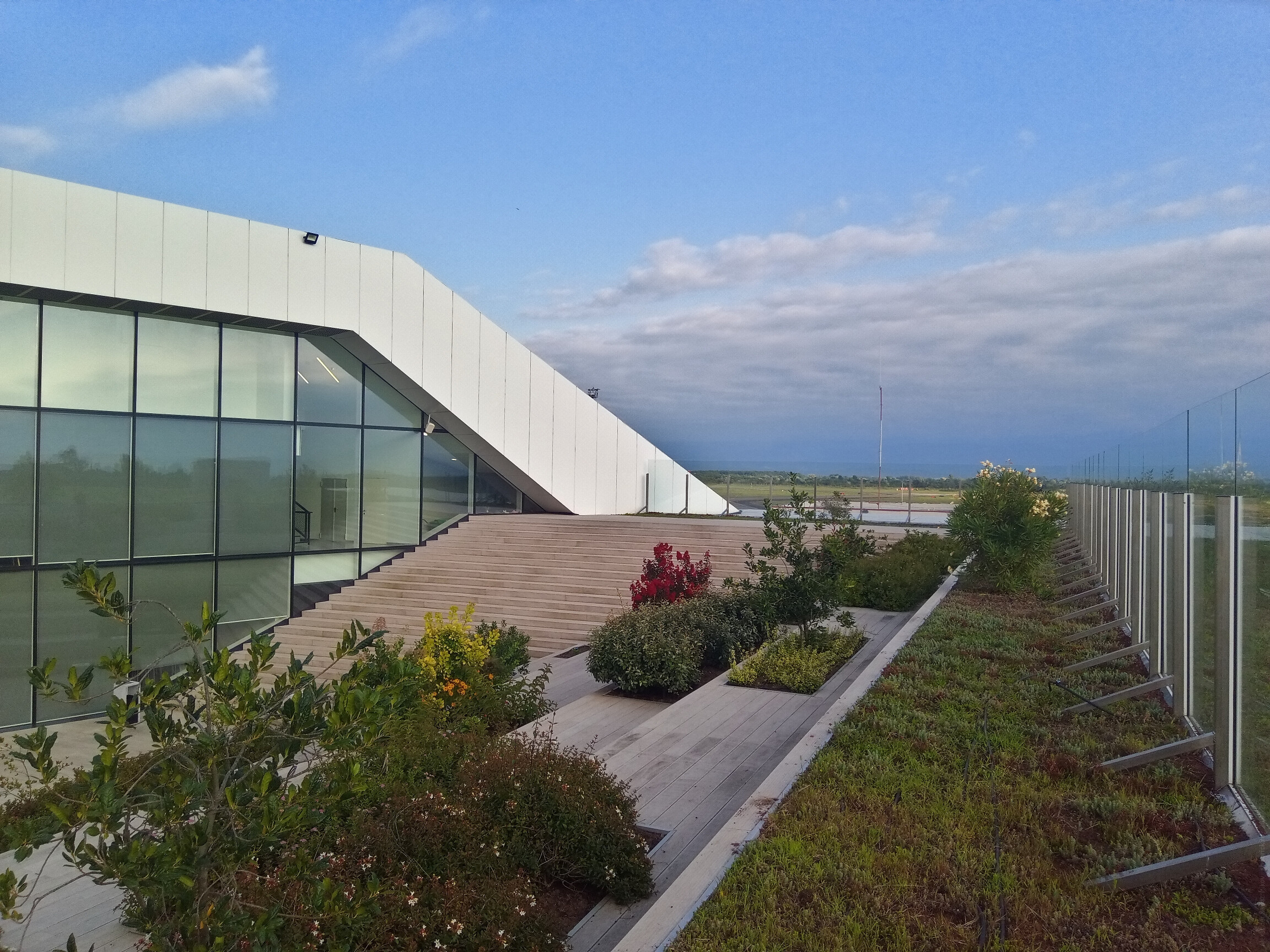
Garden terrace of the airport terminal

=== Passenger figures ===
Annual passenger statistics Kutaisi International Airport
Year	Passengers	Change
2024	1,722,809	▲3%
2023	1,671,198	▲110%
2022	796,063	▲282%
2021	282,514	▲154%
2020	183,873	▼79%
2019	873,616	▲42%
2018	617,373	▲52%
2017	405,173	▲49%
2016	271,363	▲48%
2015	182,954	▼16%
2014	218,003	▲16%
2013	187,939	▲1,353%
2012	12,932	▲186%
2011	4,527	▼40%
2010	7,446	Steady

=== Busiest routes ===
Top five scheduled destinations (2019)
Rank	Airport	Country	Passengers	Carriers
1	Warsaw Chopin Airport	Poland	54,722	Wizz Air
2	Vienna International Airport	Austria	52,319	Wizz Air
3	Berlin Schönefeld Airport	Germany	50,804	Wizz Air
4	Dortmund Airport	Germany	42,339	Wizz Air
5	Katowice Airport	Poland	42,081	Wizz Air

== See also ==
- List of airports in Georgia
- Transport in Georgia
- List of the busiest airports in the former USSR
