= Natakhtari Airfield =

Natakhtari Airfield ნატახტრის აეროპორტი
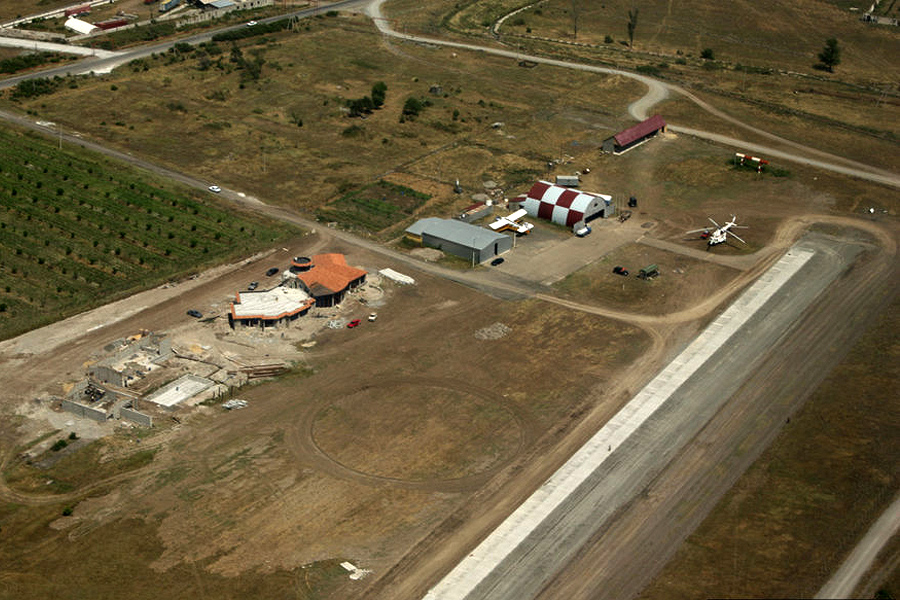
- IATA: none; ICAO: UGSA

Summary
- Airport type: Public
- Owner: Service Air
- Operator: Service Air
- Serves: Natakhtari (Mtskheta-Mtianeti) and Tbilisi; Georgia
- Hub for: Vanilla Sky
- Coordinates: 41.921°N 44.714°E
- Website: http://www.serviceair.ge/

Map
- Location of airport in Georgia

Runways
Direction	Length		Surface
Direction	ft	m	Surface
10/28	3,110	948	Concrete
- Source: GCAA

Natakhtari Airfield (ICAO: UGSA) is a domestic airport located in Natakhtari, Mtskheta-Mtianeti, Georgia. It serves as a secondary and domestic-only airfield for the Tbilisi metropolitan area at roughly 20 kilometres (12 mi) north of the city. It is privately owned and operated by the parent company of Vanilla Sky Airlines, Service Air. The airfield operates a bus link with Tbilisi in connection with scheduled flights.

== General ==
Natakhtari Airfield is located about 9 kilometres (5.6 mi) north of Georgia's historic capital, Mtskheta, a popular tourist destination. Located in the Mukhrani Valley, it serves private flights and a number of small-scale charter and scheduled domestic flights by Vanilla Sky Airlines. Apart from providing a bus service with Tbilisi in connection with scheduled flights, the airfield is also easily accessible by car: it is located on the S3 highway to Russia and nearby S1 to the west of the country.

The airfield got a new concrete paved runway in mid-2011, and it was expanded with a restaurant and swimming pool on the property during this period to make it attractive for a family day out around the flight services the airfield provides. Sightseeing flights with a helicopter or a Cessna plane are also offered from the airport.

Since the end of 2010, flights have been operating between Natakhtari and Mestia, in the northwestern mountain region of Svanetia. These were initially operated by Canadian Kenn Borek Air, but since 2014 by Vanilla Sky, a subsidiary of the owner of the airfield, Service Air. A scheduled air service was established with Ambrolauri Airport in Racha region, as soon as that airport opened in 2017. After a six-month hiatus in 2020 due to the corona pandemic, flights were resumed to both destinations in the summer of 2020.

== History ==
During the Great Patriotic War (World War II), between 1942 and 1945, a fighter aircraft division of the Soviet Air Force was stationed at Natakhtari airfield to protect strategic targets in the Caucasus area. The units took part in the Battle of the Caucasus. The division also guarded airlines between Tbilisi and Batumi in the south and Grozny in the north. In September 1945, the deployment at Natakhtari was terminated.

In the Soviet Union, the airfield was known with the IATA code NTX and the ICAO code UGYG. The airport no longer has an IATA code and the ICAO registration has been changed to UGSA.

== Airlines and destinations ==
Airlines	Destinations
Vanilla Sky Airlines	Ambrolauri, Batumi, Mestia
