= Poti Airport =

Airport in Poti, Georgia

Coordinates: 42°09′46.4″N 41°42′0.5″E

Poti Airport (Georgian: ფოთის აეროპორტი) is located in Poti, Georgia. It has been closed since the collapse of the USSR in the 1990s. The Georgian government had published plans to reconstruct the airport, but those plans have not been carried out.
