= Ambrolauri Airport =

Ambrolauri Airport ამბროლაურის აეროპორტი
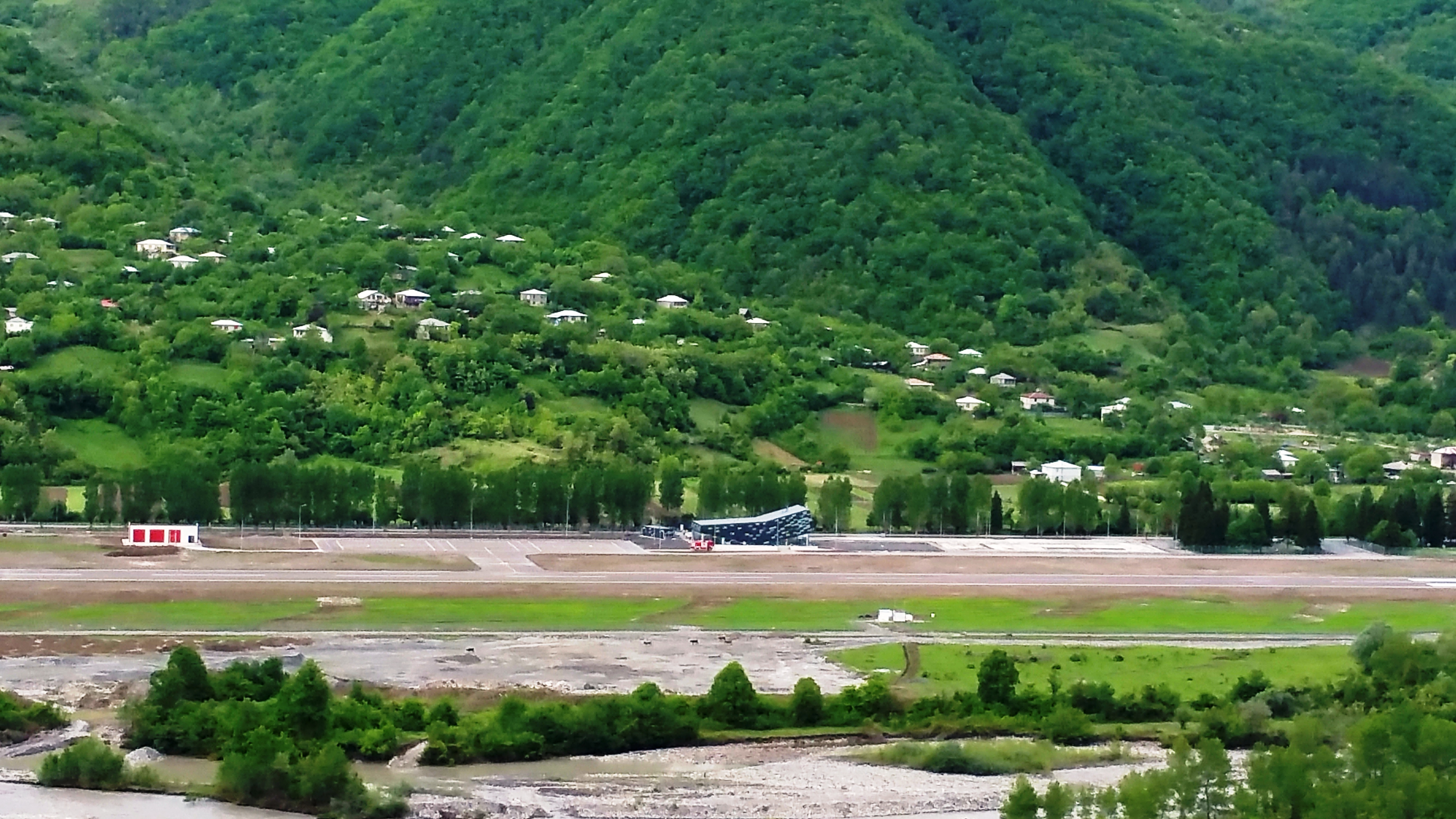
- IATA: none; ICAO: UGAM

Summary
- Airport type: Public
- Owner: United Airports of Georgia LLC
- Operator: United Airports of Georgia LLC
- Serves: Ambrolauri, Racha, Georgia
- Elevation AMSL: 1,784 ft / 544 m
- Coordinates: 42°31′34″N 43°08′09″E

Map
- Location of airport in Georgia Ambrolauri Airport (Racha-Lechkhumi and Kvemo Svaneti)

Runways
Direction	Length		Surface
Direction	m	ft	Surface
11/29	1,100	3,800	Concrete

Ambrolauri Airport (ICAO: UGAM) is a small regional airport serving Ambrolauri, a town in Racha-Lechkhumi and Kvemo Svaneti, Georgia. The airport is owned and operated by United Airports of Georgia, a state-owned company. It has been open in its current form since January 2017, and can serve airplanes up to 50 passengers capacity.

== General ==
Ambrolauri Airport is located at the edge of Ambrolauri town, in the historic Racha region on the right bank of the Rioni between the Racha and Lechkhumi Ranges and at an elevation of 544 m (1,785 ft) above sea level. The region is of tourist interest and it is the cradle of one of Georgia's pre-eminent wine varieties, the Khvanchkara, named after the village of origin 10 kilometers west of Ambrolauri. Since 2017, Vanilla Sky Airlines flies several times a week between Ambrolauri and Natakhtari Airfield near Tbilisi with a 19-seater Let L-410. After a six-month hiatus in 2020 due to the corona pandemic, flights to Ambrolaoeri resumed in the summer of 2020, and by 2021 passenger traffic recovered to pre-covid numbers.

== History ==
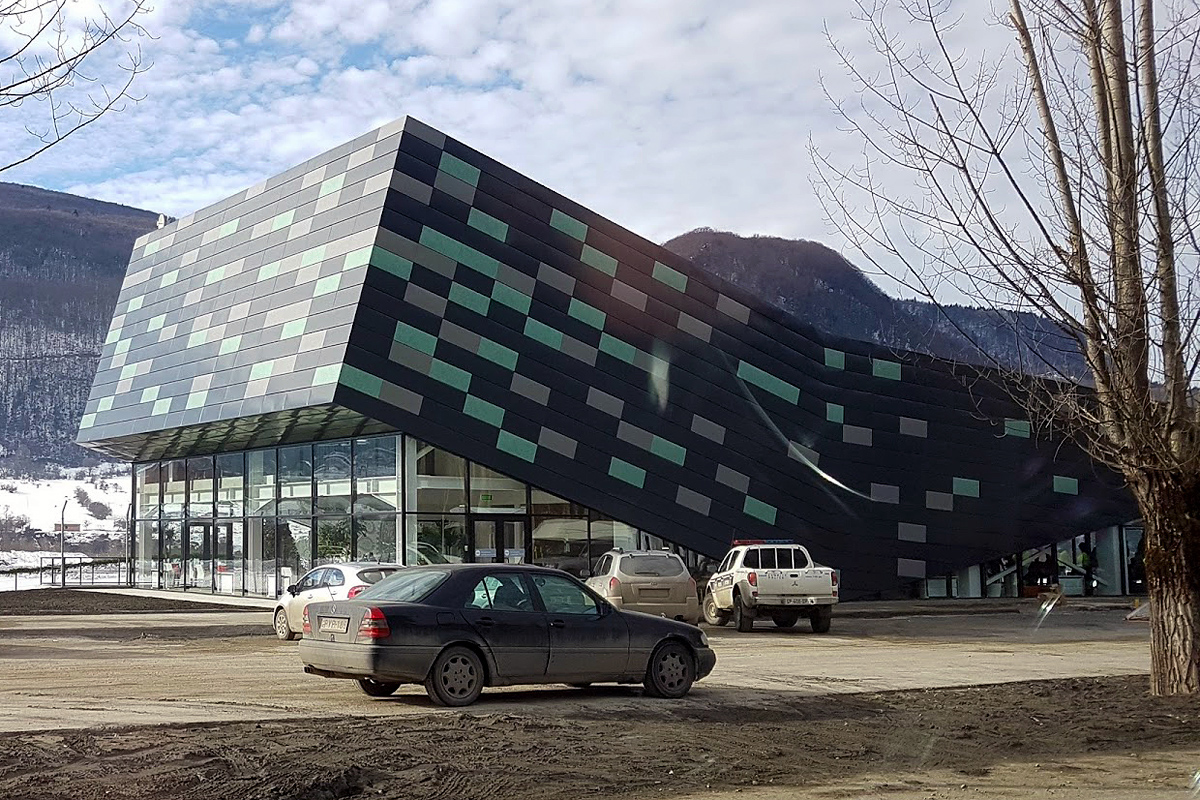
Ambrolauri Airport terminal

Then-President Mikheil Saakashvili named Ambrolauri in 2010 as one of the new regional airports to be developed to stimulate tourism. Finally, in 2015, the Georgian Aviation Authority identified four old airports suitable to revive, including Ambrolauri. This was the first of the four to be developed, and by 2022 it also turned out to be the only one. In 2016 the airport got a new 1,100 m (3,600 ft) paved concrete runway and a terminal with an area of 600m² and space for approximately 50 passengers was built. The airport opened in January 2017. The terminal was designed and constructed in such a way it can easily be expanded if future demand deems that necessary. That moment hasn't arrived yet by 2022.

== Airlines and destinations ==
Airlines	Destinations
Vanilla Sky Airlines	Natakhtari

== Statistics ==
Annual passenger statistics Ambrolauri Airport
Year	Passengers	Change
2023	2,225	▼16%
2022	2,657	▲32.9%
2021	2,000	▲64.7%
2020	1,214	▼38.3%
2019	1,966	▲24.27%
2018	1,582	▼8.18%
2017	1,723	Steady

== See also ==
- List of airports in Georgia
- Transport in Georgia
- Georgian Civil Aviation Administration
