= Natakhtari =

Natakhtari ნატახტარი
- Village
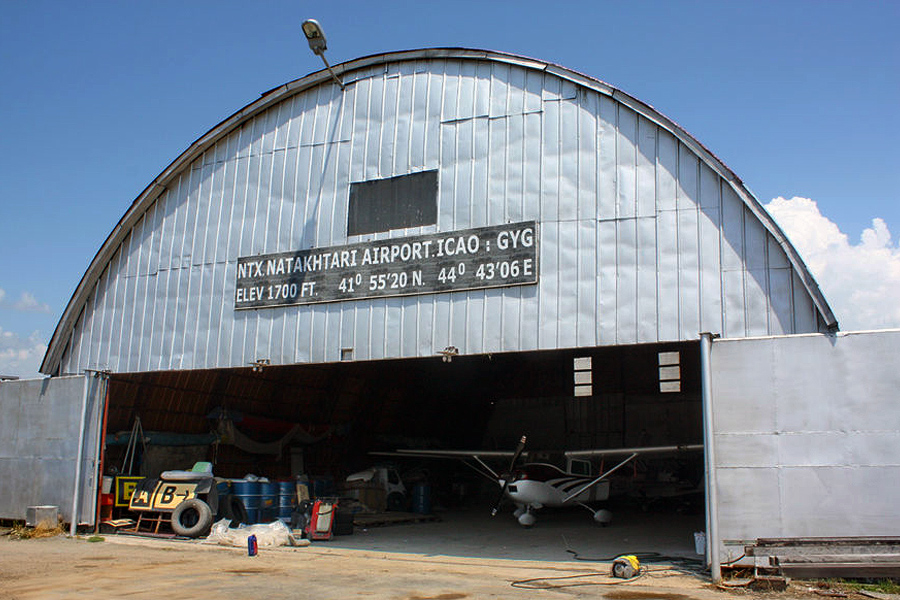
- Natakhtari Airfield

- Location of Natakhtari Natakhtari (Mtskheta-Mtianeti)
- Coordinates: 41°55′10″N 44°43′38″E
- Country: Georgia
- Mkhare: Mtskheta-Mtianeti
- Municipality: Mtskheta
- Commune: Misaktsieli
- Elevation: 510 m (1,670 ft)

Population (2014)
  - Total: 1,234
- Time zone: UTC+4 (Georgian Time)

Natakhtari (Georgian: ნატახტარი) is a village in the Mtskheta municipality of Mtskheta-Mtianeti, Georgia. Located on the right bank of the Aragvi river and at an elevation of 510 m, it's 8 km north of Mtskheta.

== See also ==
- Natakhtari Airfield
