= Belavia Flight 1834 =

2008 aviation accident in Armenia

Coordinates: 40°10′53″N 44°30′52″E

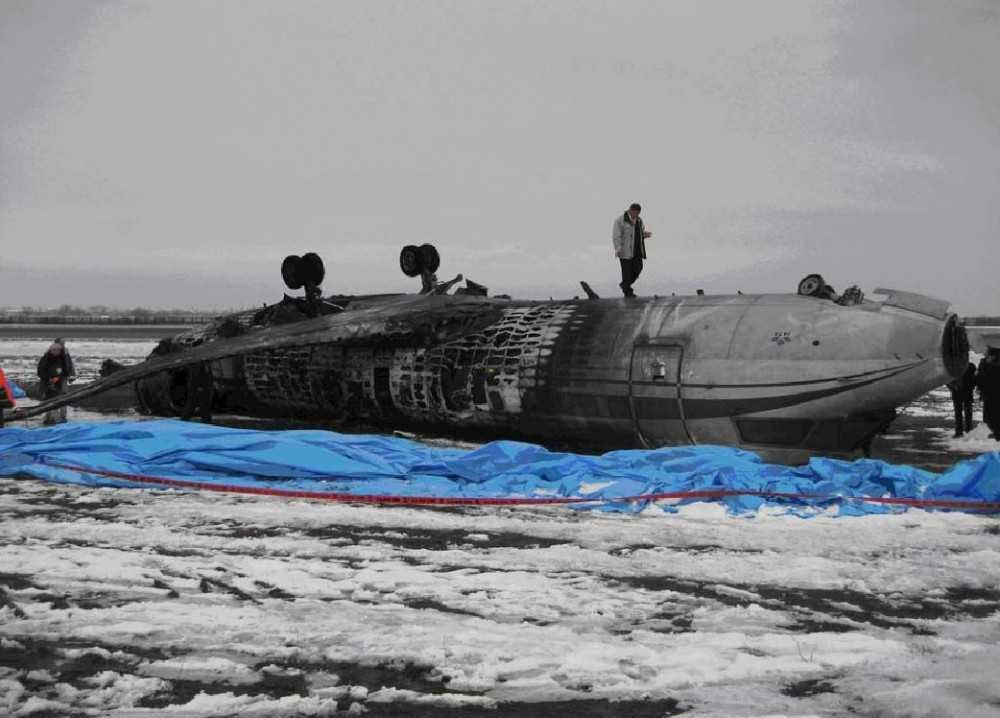
- The upside-down wreckage of the aircraft

Accident
- Date: 14 February 2008
- Summary: Loss of control following stall shortly after take-off
- Site: Zvartnots International Airport, Yerevan, Armenia

Aircraft
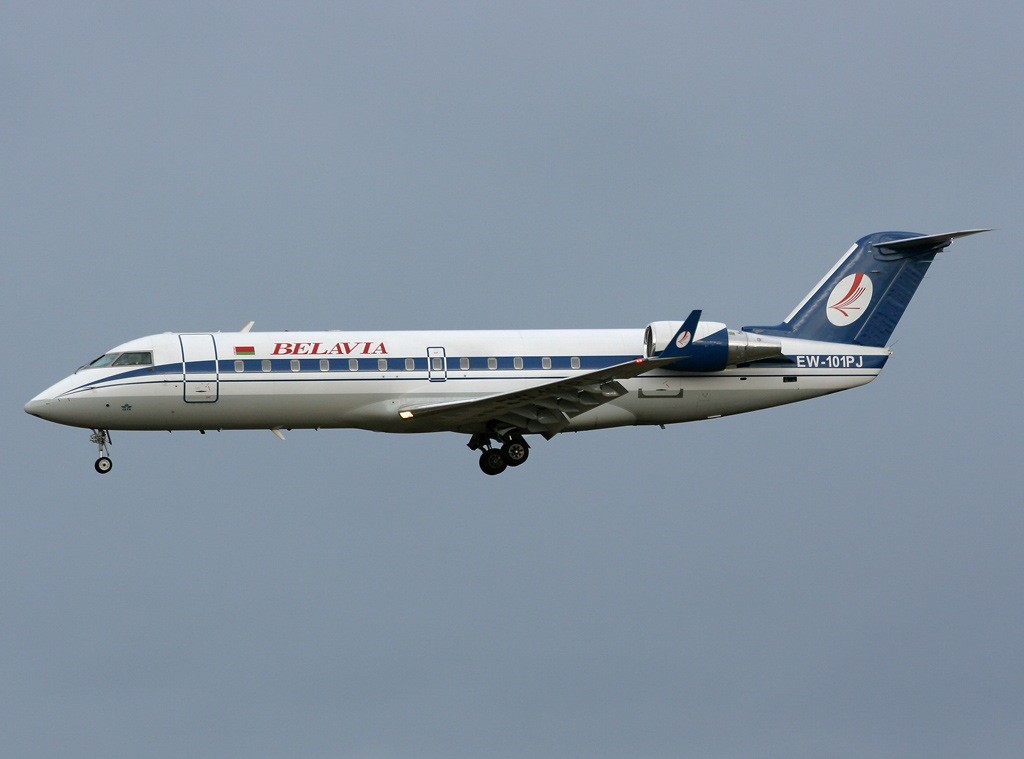
- EW-101PJ, the aircraft involved in the accident, pictured in January 2008
- Aircraft type: Bombardier CRJ100ER
- Operator: Belavia
- IATA flight No.: B21834
- ICAO flight No.: BRU1834
- Call sign: BELAVIA 1834
- Registration: EW-101PJ
- Flight origin: Zvartnots International Airport; Yerevan, Armenia
- Destination: Minsk National Airport; Minsk, Belarus
- Occupants: 21
- Passengers: 18
- Crew: 3
- Fatalities: 0
- Injuries: 7
- Survivors: 21

Belavia Flight 1834 was a scheduled international passenger flight from Yerevan, Armenia, to Minsk, Belarus, operated by Belavia. On the morning of 14 February 2008, the Bombardier Canadair Regional Jet carrying 18 passengers and three crew crashed and burst into flames shortly after takeoff from Zvartnots International Airport near Yerevan, the capital of Armenia. All on board survived, with at least seven people being injured.

== Background ==
=== Aircraft ===
The aircraft involved was a Bombardier CRJ100ER, MSN 7316, registered as EW-101PJ, that was built by Bombardier Aviation in 1999. It had logged approximately 15563 airframe hours and 14352 takeoff and landing cycles. It was also equipped with two General Electric CF34-3A1 engines.

=== Passengers and crew ===
The flight was carrying 18 passengers and 3 crew members. The 18 passengers consisted of a citizen each from Belarus, Ukraine, and Russia, along with five Georgians and ten Armenians.

The captain was 50-year-old Viktor Shishlo, who had logged 9,215 flight hours, including 461 hours on the CRJ100. The first officer was 44-year-old Alexander Mukhin, who had 9,454 flight hours with 405 of them on the CRJ100.

== Accident ==
During takeoff, at 04:18 AMT and at a height of around 5 metres (16 ft), the aircraft banked left. The pilot attempted to counter the banking by straightening the aircraft towards the right. The aircraft's wing subsequently entered in contact with the ground and crashed, catching fire and splitting into two. Fire and rescue crews were reportedly on-site within 50 seconds after the crash. The passengers also helped the crew members out of the cockpit. After the crash, the aircraft, badly damaged by fire, laid in an inverted position.

None of the 21 occupants were killed, although seven passengers received serious injuries.

== Investigation ==
Initial speculation pointed to icing on the wings which caused the left wing to stall upon lift-off. Icing conditions were reported at the airport during the crash, causing ice build up while the aircraft was parked and taxiing. Since CRJs are very prone to wing contamination and icing, an Airworthiness Directive was issued by Transport Canada on the need to include anti-icing systems in the final stage of taxiing.

Investigation teams from the General Department of Civil Aviation of Armenia, from Belarus, and from Bombardier participated in the investigation to determine the probable cause of the accident.

== See also ==
- Aviation safety
- List of accidents and incidents involving commercial aircraft
- Delta Connection Flight 4819 – another CRJ that also crashed upside down during landing in 2025.
