= Belavia =

State-owned flag carrier of Belarus

Belavia Белавія

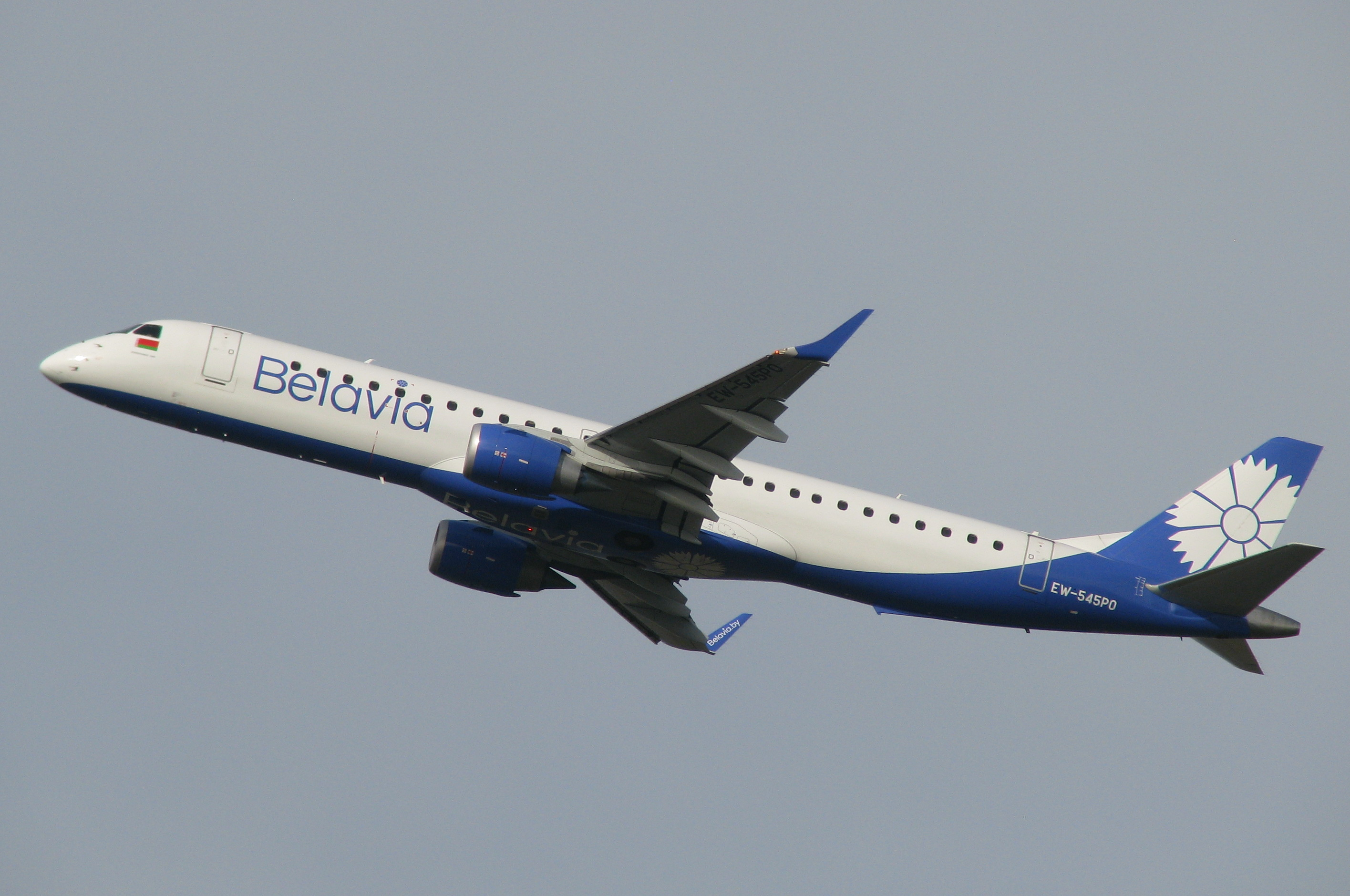
- Embraer E195
IATA	ICAO	Call sign
B2	BRU	BELARUS AVIA
- Founded: 5 March 1996; 30 years ago
- Hubs: Minsk National Airport
- Frequent-flyer program: Belavia Leader
- Fleet size: 18
- Destinations: 37
- Parent company: Government of Belarus
- Headquarters: Minsk, Belarus
- Key people: Igor Nikolaevich Cherginets, Director-general
- Revenue: ▼ Br 520,000,000 (2020)
- Net income: ▼ – Br 92,000,000 (2020)
- Website: belavia.by

Belavia (Belarusian: Белавія; Russian: Белавиа), formally Belavia Belarusian Airlines, is the flag carrier of Belarus, headquartered in Minsk. The state-owned company had, as of 2007, 1,017 employees. Belavia serves a network of routes between Commonwealth of Independent States, as well as some Middle East, China, India, Thailand and Vietnam destinations, from its base at Minsk National Airport.

Following the Ryanair Flight 4978 incident on 23 May 2021, the airline has been banned from the European Union, the United Kingdom, Switzerland, and Ukraine.

== History ==
=== 1933–1944 ===
Belavia's logo used until 2016

On 7 November 1933, the first Belarusian air terminal opened in Minsk. In the next spring, 3 Po-2 became the first aircraft of the Belarusian air fleet. In 1936 the first regular air route between Minsk and Moscow was established. The Belarusian civil aviation group, an Aeroflot subdivision, was officially founded in the summer of 1940. That year, Belarusian aviators transported 2,200 passengers, 1,534 doctors, 117 ill people, and 338 tonnes of cargo.

Belarusian civil aviators participated in World War II as part of the Western Civil Air Fleet Group, which included three regiments, and was under the control of the Red Army, From June 1941 to June 1942, they transported 60,149 military personnel, evacuated 37,680 people, carried 583.1 tonnes of ammunition, and dropped 3,106 bombs. They also assisted Belarusian partisans by transporting 467.9 tonnes of cargo to them and evacuating 1,433 people between 1941 and 1944. Air connection between Minsk and Moscow was restored in 1944.

=== 1945–1991 ===
After the war, the air fleet in Belarus was expanded by adding Lisunov Li-2 aircraft. Routes were introduced to Mogilev, Vitebsk, Bobruisk, Gomel, Baranovichi, and Polotsk. By 1946, the total distance covered by air travel had doubled compared to 1940. During the next five years, local transport aviation carried over 230,000 passengers, 5,227 tonnes of mail, and 7,127 tonnes of cargo. At the same time, the Belarusian SSR also established air connections with the Baltic states, Leningrad, Kishinev and Kaliningrad.

The Ilyushin Il-12 was introduced in 1951, soon followed by the Ilyushin Il-14. Since 1954, flight attendants appeared on flights. From 1955 onwards, the older Po-2 biplanes were gradually replaced by more modern aircraft like the Yakovlev Yak-12 and Antonov An-2.

In the 1960s, the Antonov An-12 and later the Tupolev Tu-124 began operating on the Moscow-Minsk route. The Antonov An-24 was introduced in 1967. The number of passengers departing from Belarusian airports grew to 530,000, which was a 7.6-fold increase since 1958. The total length of the air routes expanded to 17,500 kilometers. By the end of the decade, the Belarusian Association of Civil Aviation flew 35 routes of Soviet Union importance and 67 domestic ones; it also flew to other countries of the Eastern Bloc, including East Germany. In 1972, the fleet was expanded with the Yakovlev Yak-40 and later with the Tupolev Tu-134. Belarus became recognized as the primary center of expertise for this aircraft within the Soviet Union. The 1980s saw the introduction of the Tupolev Tu-154.

Average annual passengers carried (in thousands)
1940	1946–1950	1951–1955	1956–1958	1959–1965	1966–1970	1981–1985
2.2	46.6	317.9	68.5	489.0	1,145.4	1,920.0

=== 1992–2020 ===
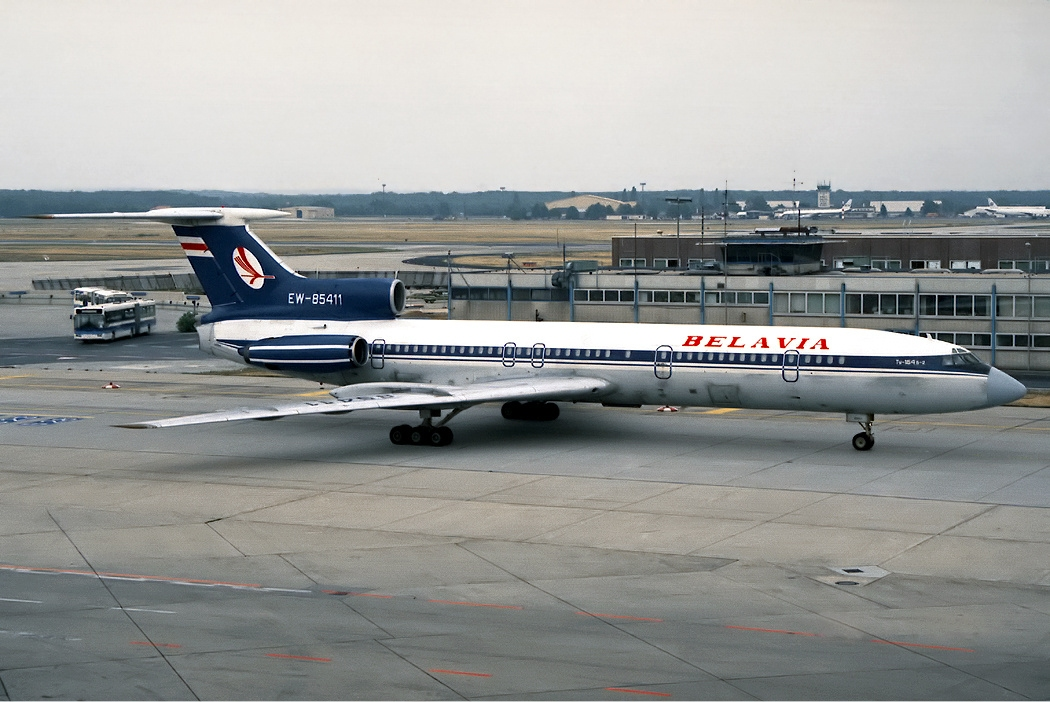
Tupolev TU-154M in July 1994, showing the previous Belarus flag

Upon the dissolution of the Soviet Union, Belarus republic acquired a fleet of aircraft, comprising 24 Tu-154s, 19 Tu-134s, 18 An-24s, 7 An-26s, and 8 Yak-40s. This fleet was initially part of the Belarusian Civil Aviation Association "Belavia".

In 1996, the association underwent reorganization, leading to the formation of the national airline, Belavia, which subsequently joined IATA that same year. Belavia took over Minskavia in 1998 and Mogilevavia in 2000. In 2003, the fleet expanded with the delivery of Boeing 737-500, the first introduction of Western-manufactured aircraft in Belarus.

Between 2003 and 2009, the airline saw its passenger numbers double and in 2009 handled just under 700,000 customers.

Three leased Bombardier CRJ 100 aircraft were introduced on regional services from Minsk. The first one was delivered in February 2007, with the other two later in 2007. They directly replaced the aging Antonov An-24 and Tupolev Tu-134 aircraft. It was looking to lease two Bombardier CRJ-700s in 2010. Belavia had also planned to retire its remaining Tupolev Tu-154Ms by 2011 following he retirement of its last Tupolev Tu-134 in summer 2009 which was replaced by an ex-FlyLAL Boeing 737-500. On 27 June 2014, an order was announced for three Boeing 737-800 aircraft to be acquired directly by Belavia. The first of these was delivered in August 2016.

In August 2016, Belavia received their first aircraft with their new livery. This is the first re-branding since the company's founding in 1996 on its 20 years anniversary. The new livery was applied a brand new Boeing 737-800. The much newer 737s replaced the aging Tupolev Tu-154s. On 1 October 2016, Belavia retired their two remaining Tupolev Tu-154s from scheduled services as one of the last airlines worldwide to do so.

In 2019, the company employed nearly 1,900 people, and generated a turnover of 374 million euros with an operating result of 49 million euros. During this year it carried almost 4 million passengers, an increase of more than 15% compared to the 2018 figure.

Several employees who participated in 2020 Belarusian protests were forced to leave their jobs.

=== Sanctions from 2021 ===
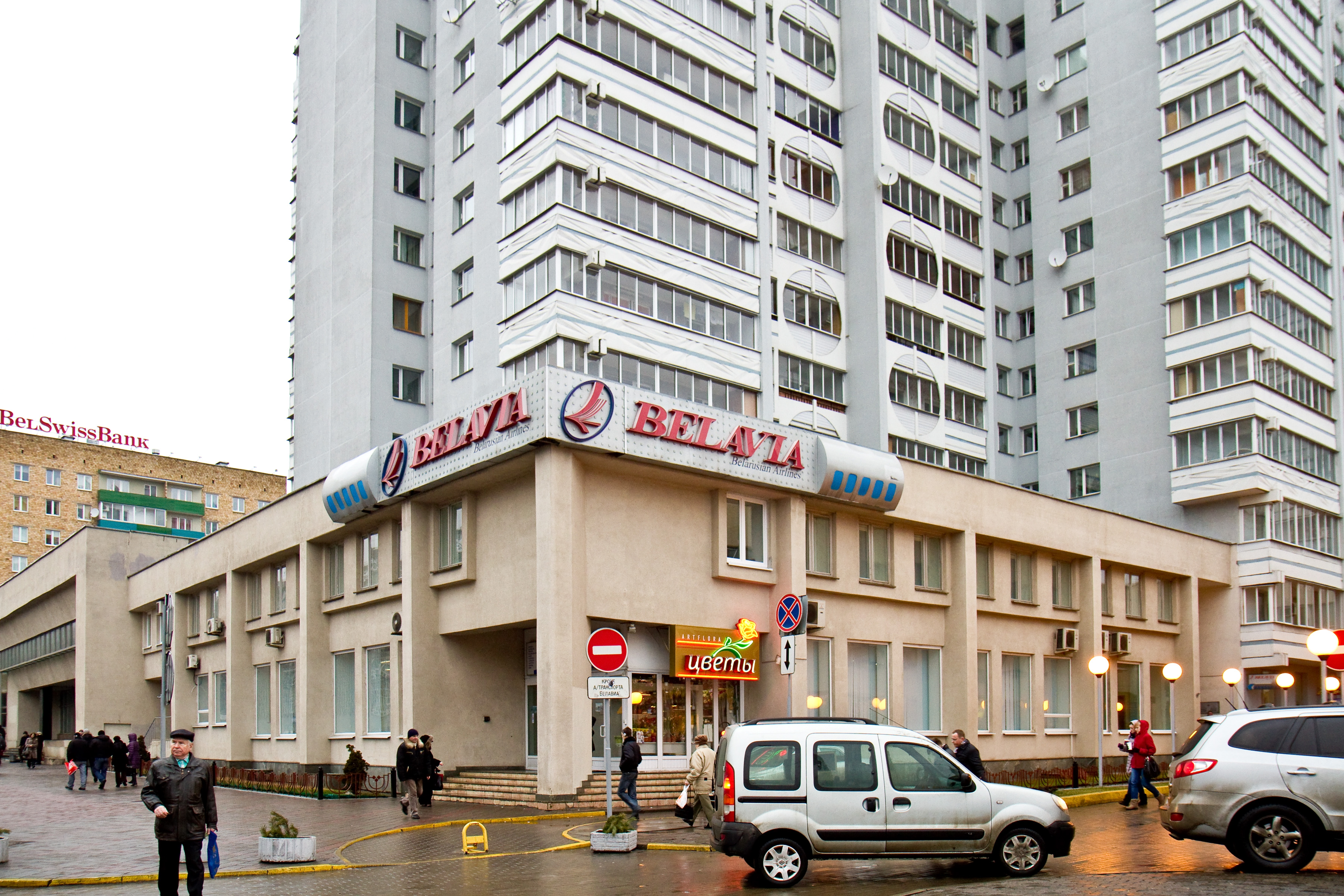
Headquarters building in Minsk

On 24 May 2021, the British government suspended Belavia's operating permit in response to the Ryanair Flight 4978 incident. The European Union and Ukraine subsequently banned Belarusian airliners from entering their airspace or using their airports, effectively banning Belavia which led to the suspension of vast parts of their route network.

Also in 2021, Belavia was accused of orchestrating the influx of illegal migrants during the Belarus–European Union border crisis. In September 2021 it has been reported that Belavia might face to lose the majority of its current fleet as its lessors might be no longer allowed to lease them out to Belarusian airlines as part of new embargoes. At this point Belavia owned 18 smaller, older aircraft, but had rented several modern jets from Western companies, with the Irish AerCap with six and the Danish Nordic Aviation Capital with seven aircraft being the most important suppliers. On 16 November, the European Union confirmed the termination of all aircraft leases to Belarus by European lessors, which forces the airline to return half of their current fleet on short notice.

On 2 December 2021, Belavia was added to the sanctions list of the European Union. Switzerland joined the EU sanctions on 20 December. On 8 April 2022, the US Department of Commerce restricted flights on Belarusian owned or operated aircraft manufactured in the US along with Aeroflot, Aviastar, Azur Air, Rossiya and Utair from flying into Belarus or Russia. On 16 June 2022 the US broadened its restrictions on Belavia after violations of the sanctions' regime were detected. The effect of the restrictions is to ground the US-manufactured part of its fleet.

In August 2023, the United States added Belavia to the Specially Designated Nationals and Blocked Persons List. US sanctions were lifted in September 2025.

In February 2024, Grodno Aviakompania, the only other passenger operator of the country, was merged and incorporated into Belavia by decree from the Ministry of Transport and Communications.

In June 2025, Belavia took delivery of three used Airbus A330-200 for international routes. The aircraft were delivered using Gambian registrations to sidestep sanctions. By June 2026, all three aircraft had been inducted into service. In the same month, three former SkyUp Airlines Boeing 737-800 with Gambian registrations arrived in Minsk National Airport to bolster short to medium range routes.

== Business trends ==
	Revenue (Br m)	Operating income (Br m)	Net income (Br m)	Total assets (Br m)	Employees	Aircraft	Passengers (m)	References
2010						16	1.0	
2011						17	1.0	
2012						20	1.3	
2013						22	1.6	
2014 (Note: Takes into account denomination in 2016)	325.0	24.5	18.8		1715	26	2.0	
2015	410.8	2.1	1.5		1640	27	2.1	
2016	520.3	38.6	26.8	452.6	1625	26	2.5	
2017	600.8	57.6	37.7	455.4		26	3.0	
2018	719.7	102.7	68.9	790.0		28	3.4	
2019	882.8	101.4	68.2	1,150.0		30	4.1	
2020	519.8	-114.4	-92.1	1,311.2	1908	27	1.7	

Belavia carried 2 million passengers in 2021 and 1.6 million in 2022.

== Destinations ==
Prior to the COVID-19 pandemic, Belavia operated flights to Asia, Europe, and Africa from its base at Minsk National Airport. In addition to scheduled destinations listed here, Belavia operates charter flights to leisure destinations and VIP charters. On the eve of the Ryanair Flight 4978 forced takedown incident, it served one domestic destination and 54 international destinations in 32 countries. As a result of the subsequent ban on Belarusian airliners entering the EU, UK and Ukrainian airspace, the airline is effectively stripped off all but twenty of these destinations: owing to the geographical constraints, access to Chișinău (Moldova) and Belgrade (Serbia) has become de facto impossible, despite these non-EU member states not having issued any independent travel bans on Belavia. On 28 May 2021, the airline confirmed the cancellation of flights that would otherwise be forced to pass through restricted airspace as well as their ongoing efforts to reroute the Istanbul, Turkey, connection, up to this point handled using a straight route over Ukraine, Moldova, Romania as well as Bulgaria's territorial waters.

As of November 2025, the airline serves 16 countries on 28 routes.

=== Codeshare agreements ===
Belavia has codeshare agreements with the following airlines:

- Nordwind Airlines
- Red Wings Airlines
- Utair

As of 2025, codeshare agreements with the following airlines are suspended or terminated:

- Austrian Airlines
- Azerbaijan Airlines
- AirBaltic
- Air France
- Czech Airlines
- Etihad Airways
- Finnair
- KLM
- LOT Polish Airlines
- Turkish Airlines
- Uzbekistan Airways

=== Interline agreements ===
Belavia has active interline agreements with the following airlines:

- Aeroflot

== Fleet ==
=== Current fleet ===
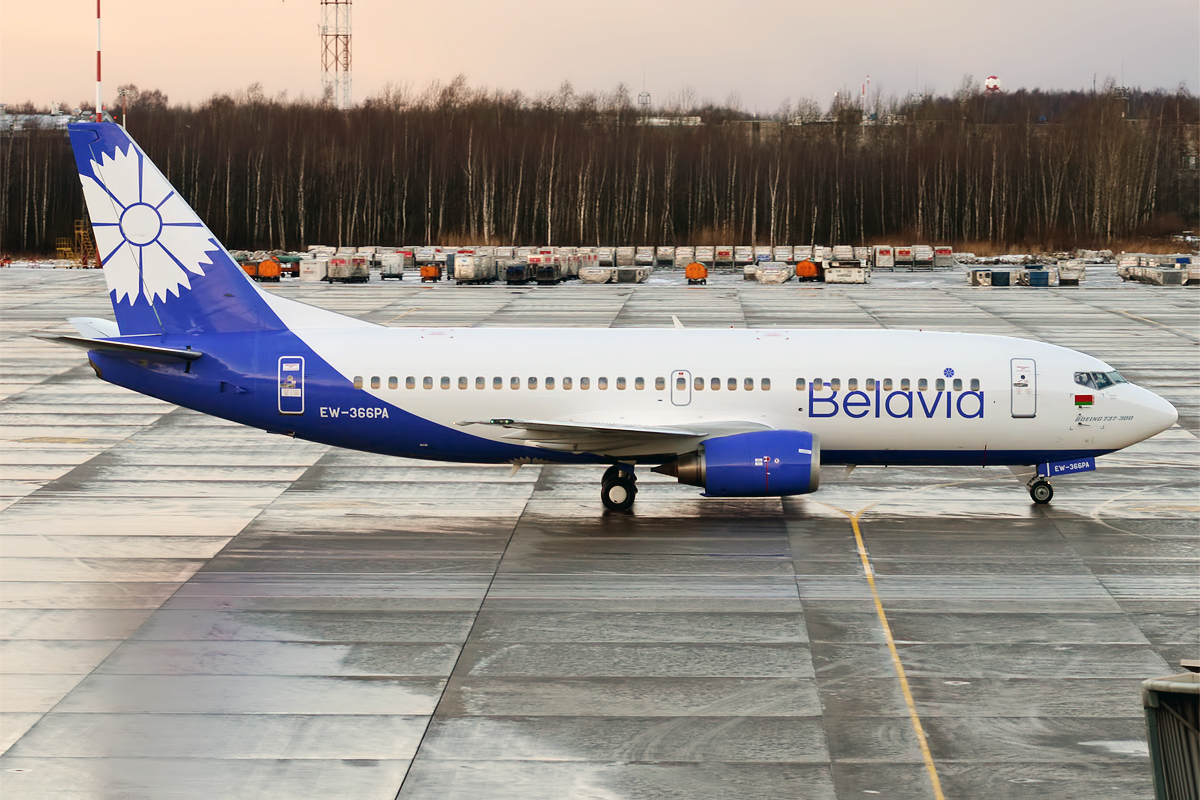
Boeing 737-300

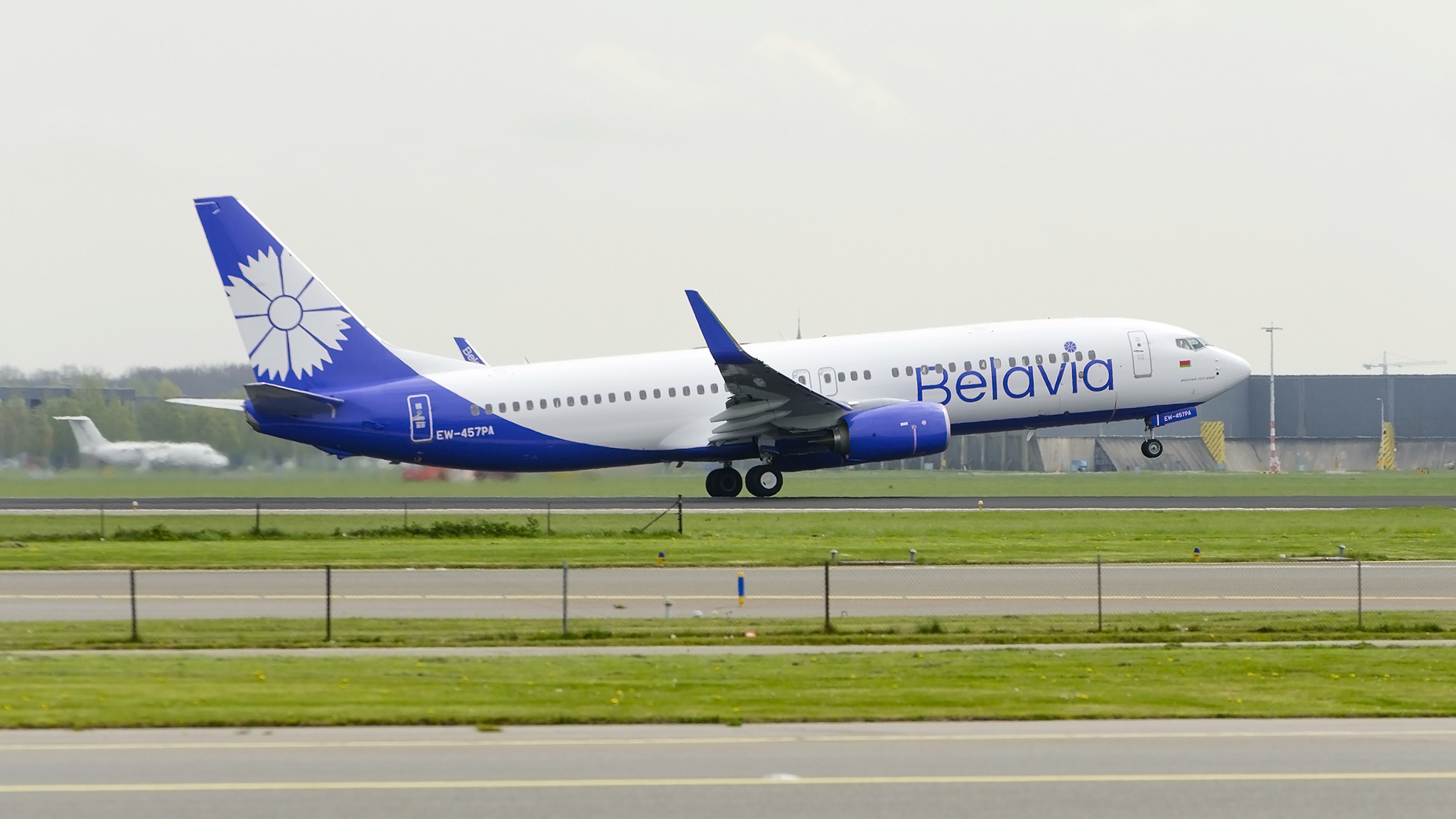
Boeing 737-800

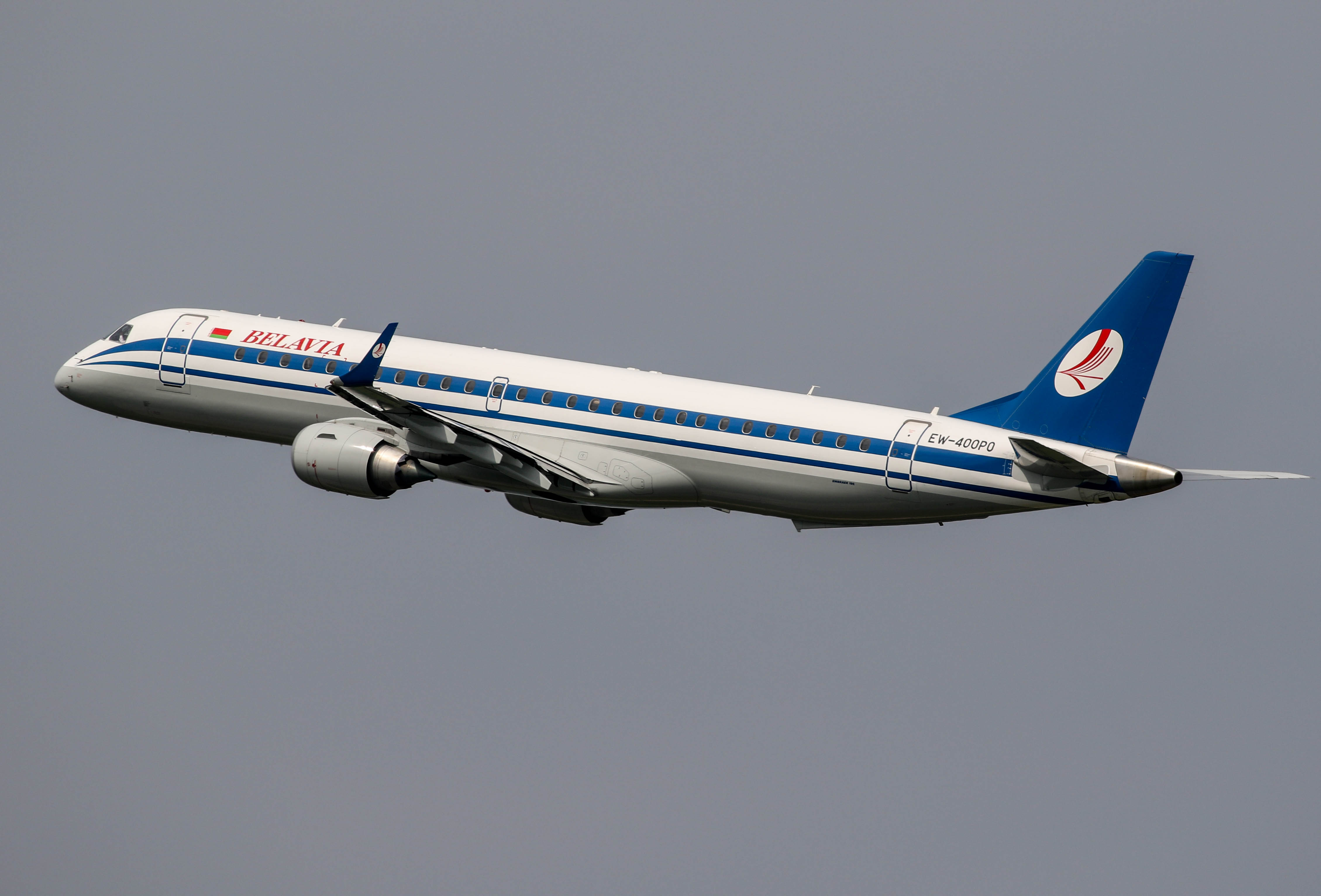
Embraer E195 in the airline's "retro" livery

As of June 2026, Belavia operates the following aircraft:

Aircraft	In service	Orders	Passengers				Notes
Aircraft	In service	Orders	J	W	Y	Total	Notes
Airbus A330-200	3	—	18	—	263	281	
Boeing 737-300	1	—	—	—	148	148	One aircraft retired in 2022.
Boeing 737-800	8	—	—	—	189	189	Three former SkyUp Airlines aircraft delivered in June 2026.
Boeing 737 MAX 8	1	—	12	—	162	174	
Embraer E175	1	—	12	—	64	76	
Embraer E195	4	—	11	—	96	107	EW-400PO in HC Dinamo Minsk livery.
Total	18	—					

Additionally, the Belarusian government which owns Belavia operated at least three other aircraft types: Boeing 737-800, Boeing 767-300, and Bombardier CRJ200.

In April 2021, Belavia acquired its first Boeing 737 MAX 8, one of five it had ordered; however, the remaining aircraft were not delivered.

=== Historic fleet ===
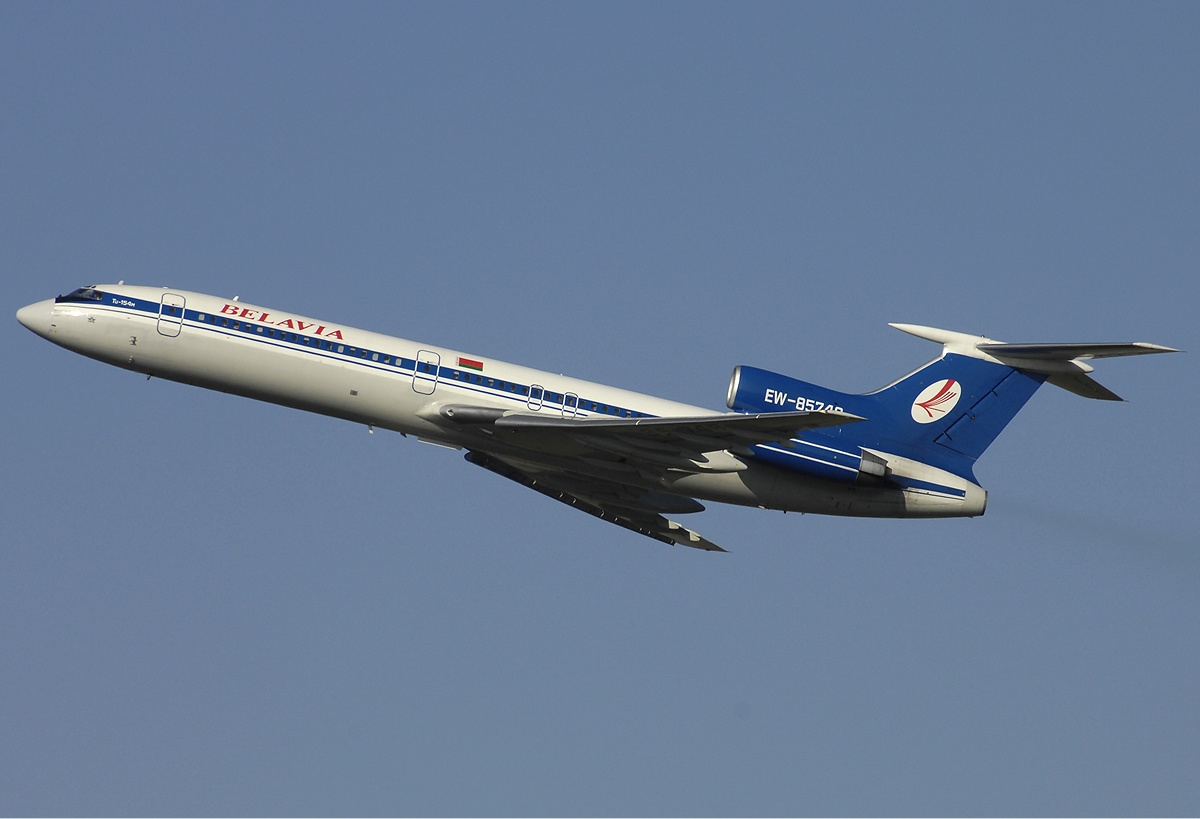
Tupolev TU-154M in 2006

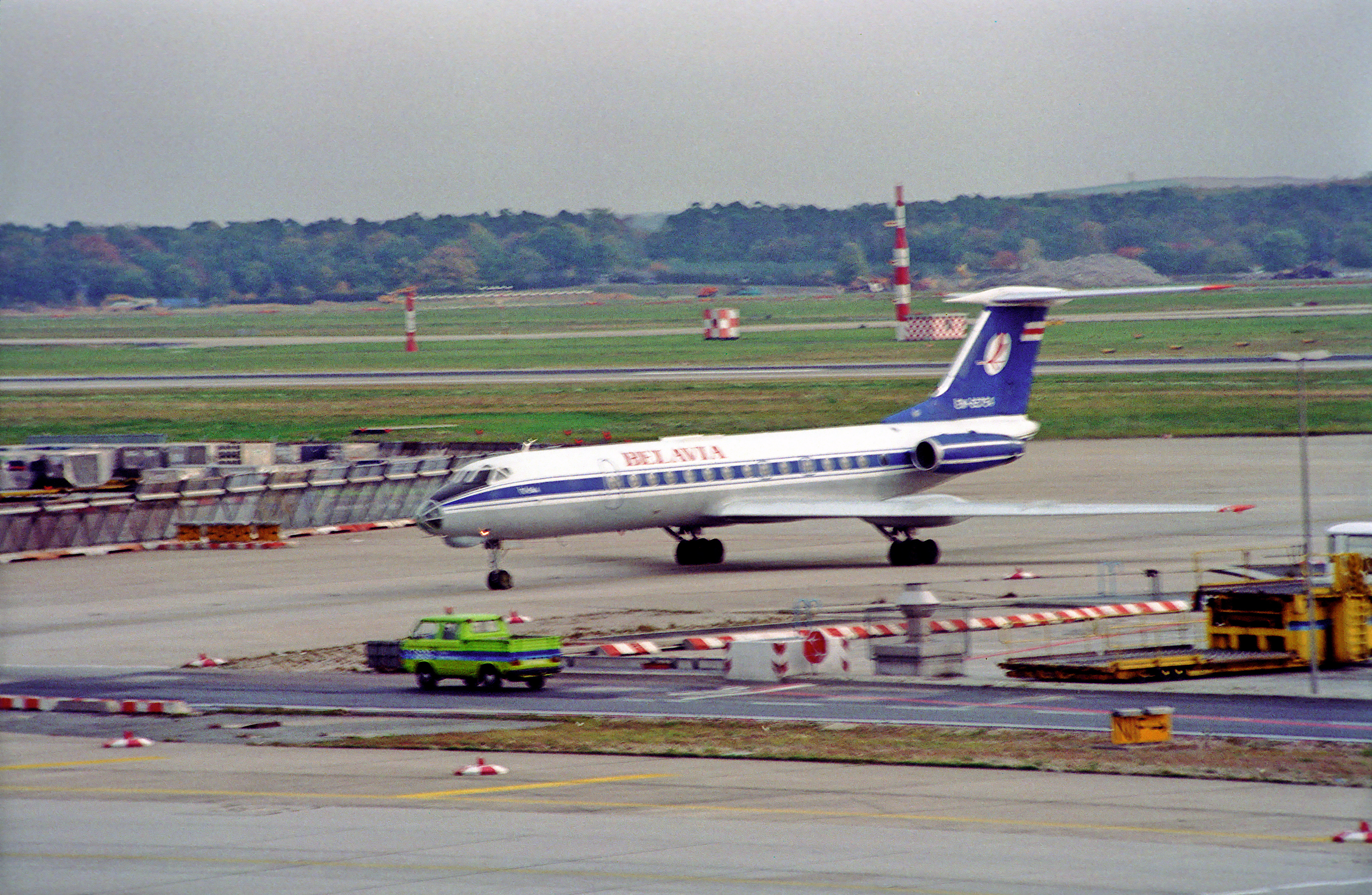
Tupolev 134

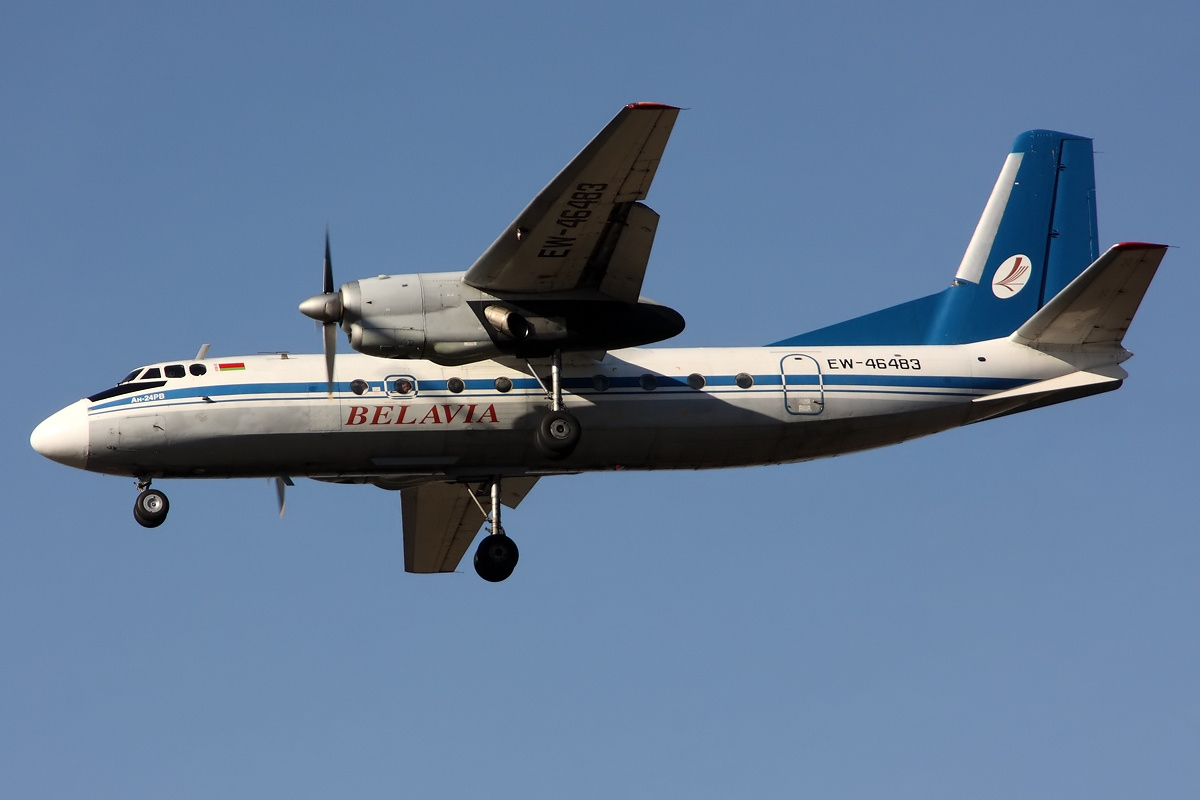
Antonov An-24RV

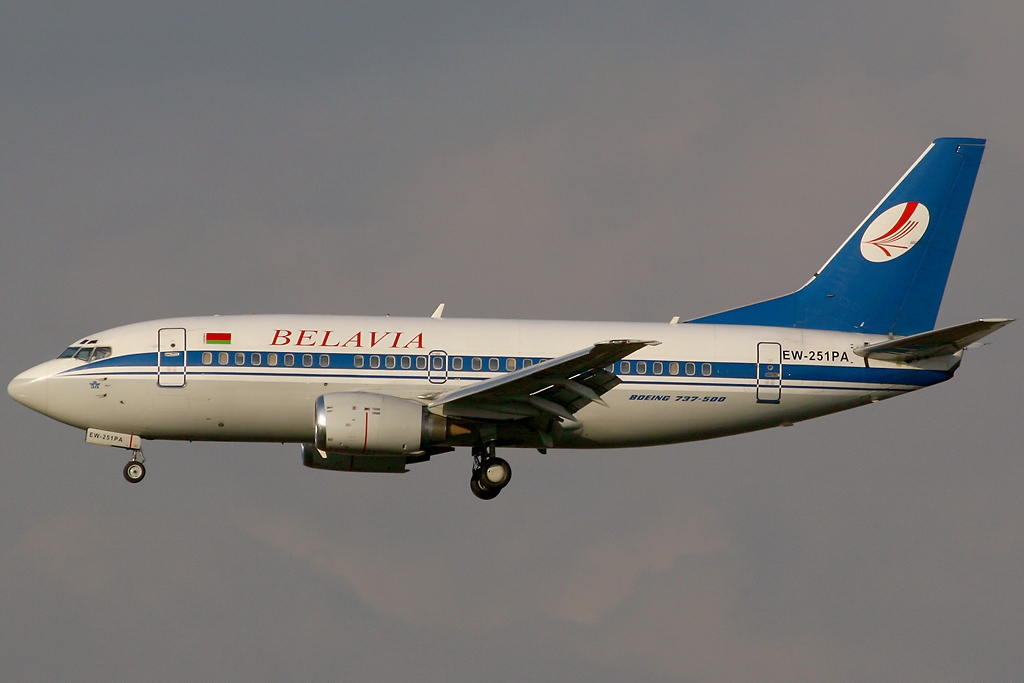
Boeing 737-500

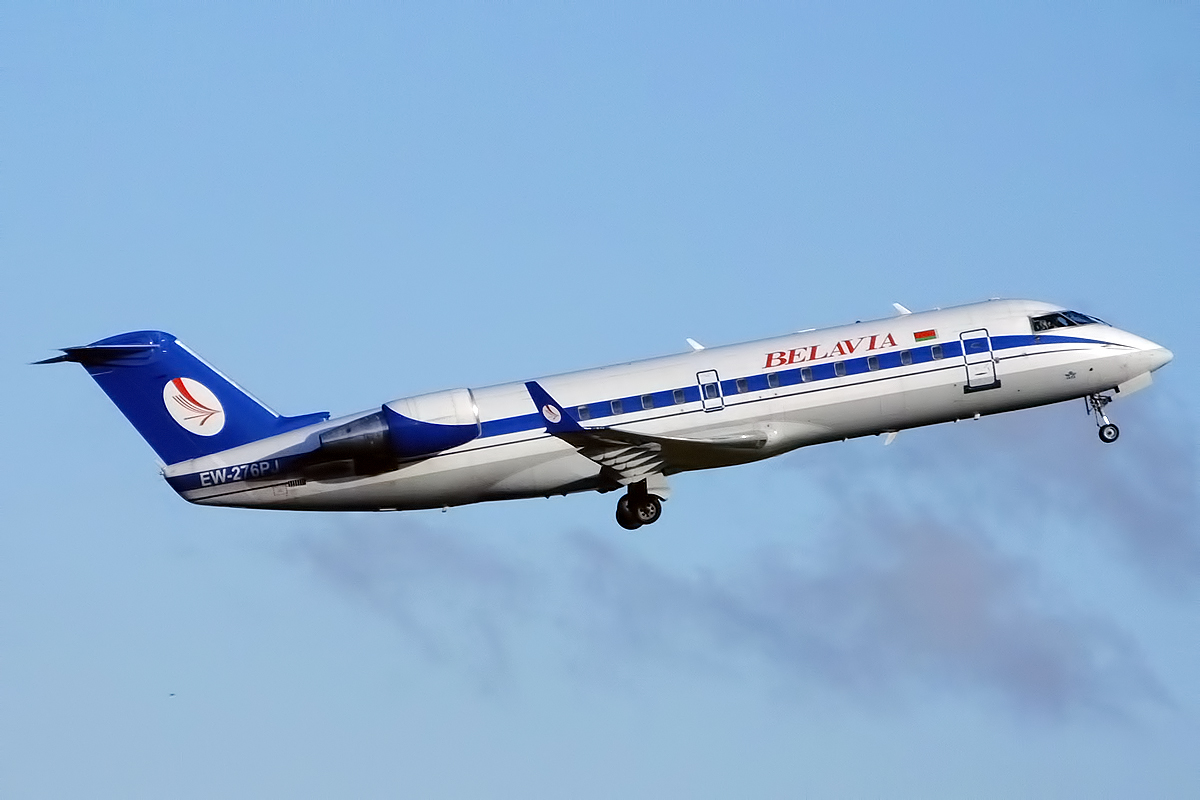
Canadair CRJ200

Belavia Retired Fleet
Aircraft	Total	Introduced	Retired	Notes
Antonov An-2	Unknown	Unknown	Unknown	
Antonov An-10	Unknown	Unknown	Unknown	
Antonov An-12	Unknown	1962	Unknown	
Antonov An-24	18 (Note: at least)	1967	2009	
Antonov An-26	7	Unknown	2002	
Boeing 737-500	6	2003	2021	
Bombardier CRJ100/200	5	2007	2020	
Embraer E195-E2	3	2019	2021	Returned to lessor.
Ilyushin Il-12	Unknown	1951	Unknown	
Ilyushin Il-14	Unknown	Unknown	Unknown	
Lisunov Li-2	Unknown	Unknown	Unknown	
Polikarpov Po-2	Unknown	1934	Unknown	
Tupolev Tu-124	Unknown	Unknown	Unknown	
Tupolev Tu-134	19	Unknown	2009	
Tupolev Tu-154	24	1983	2016	One used as training mock-up.
Yakovlev Yak-12	Unknown	Unknown	Unknown	
Yakovlev Yak-40	8	1972	2005	

== Incidents and accidents ==
- On 1 February 1985, Aeroflot Flight 7841, a Tupolev Tu-134, departing from Minsk for Leningrad on February 5, 1985, suffered an engine failure shortly after takeoff and was forced to crash-land in a forest, killing 58 of the 80 people on board.
- On 6 January 2003, a Yakovlev Yak-40 suffered a shattered windshield during a flight, en route to Prague. Two Czech Air Force fighters accompanied the plane to a safe landing in Ruzyně International Airport.
- On 14 February 2008, Belavia Flight 1834, a Bombardier CRJ100ER en route from Yerevan, Armenia, to Minsk, hit its left wing on the runway during takeoff from Zvartnots International Airport, subsequently crashing on the ground, flipping over and coming to a stop inverted near the runway. All 18 passengers and 3 crew members managed to escape the aircraft before it erupted into flames, partly due to the timely response of the fire and rescue crew at the airport. The main cause of the crash was icing contamination leading to a stall of the left wing.

== Bibliography ==
Degtev, Vasily (1973). Крылья Белоруссии [Wings of Byelorussia] (PDF) (in Russian). Minsk: Belarus. Archived from the original (PDF) on 23 July 2025.
