= Grodno Aviakompania =

Aviakompania Grodno
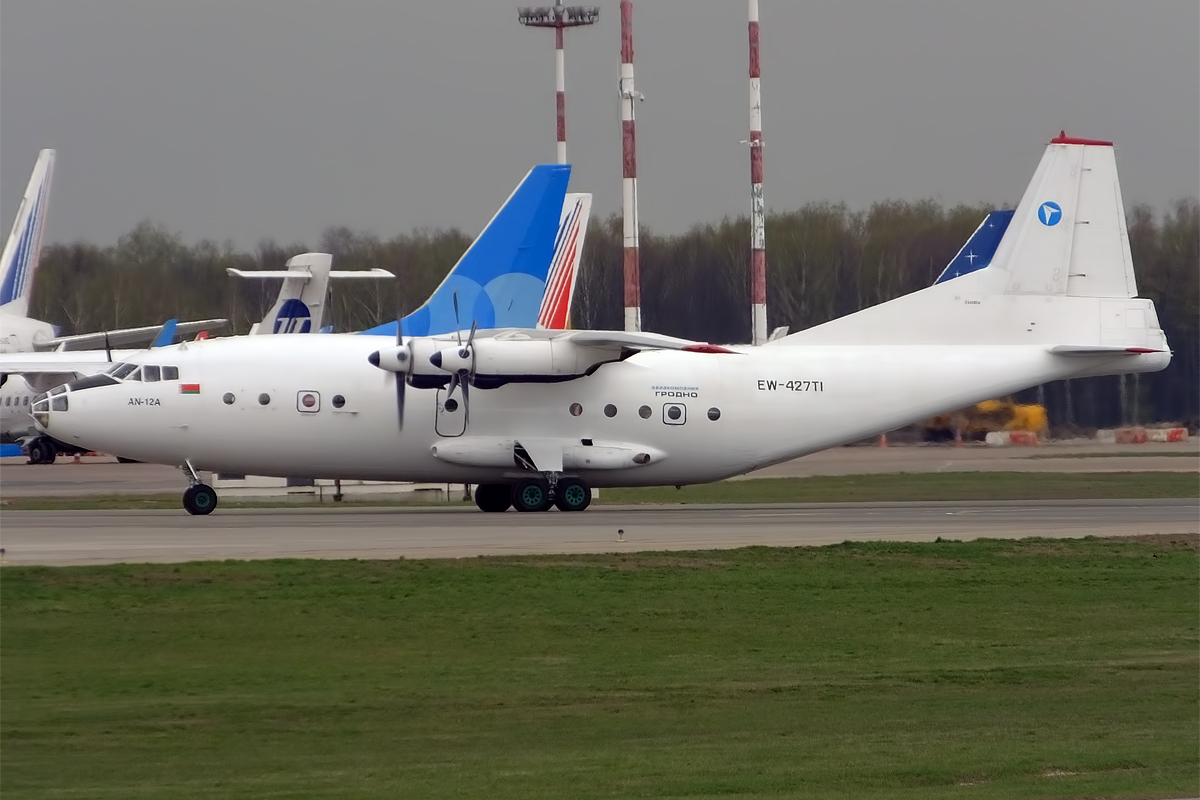
- A Grodno Aviakompania Antonov AN-12A
IATA	ICAO	Call sign
—	GRX	GRODNO
- Founded: 1945
- Ceased operations: 2024
- Hubs: Grodno, Belarus
- Fleet size: 16
- Website: grodnoavia.com

Open Stock Joint Company “Aircompany Grodno” (Belarusian: Адкрытае акцыянернае таварыства «Авіякампанія "Гродна"»), also known as Aviakompania Grodno, was a Belarusian Cargo Airline based in Grodno, Belarus.

== History ==
Aviakompania Grodno was founded in 1945 after World War II, operating the Polikarpov Po-2 for Aerial application within the Byelorussian Soviet Socialist Republic (BSSR). The airline quickly acquired more aircraft, including the Yakovlev Yak-12, and the Antonov An-2.The airline later on acquired Antonov An-12 aircraft, and ended the aerial application business to start cargo transport. The airline operated cargo until 2024, when it was merged with Belavia, the state airline of Belarus.

== Fleet ==
Aviakompania Grodno had an entirely Soviet aircraft fleet, with 11 Antonov An-2 aircraft, three Antonov An-12 aircraft, and an unknown amount Antonov An-30 and Antonov An-32 aircraft.

== Accidents and incidents ==
On 3 November 2021, Grodno Aviakompania Flight 1252 crashed into a wooded forest east of Irkutsk Airport, killing all nine people onboard. This was due to the crew not maintaining a proper glide path on approach.
