= Grodno Aviakompania Flight 1252 =

2021 aviation accident in Irkutsk

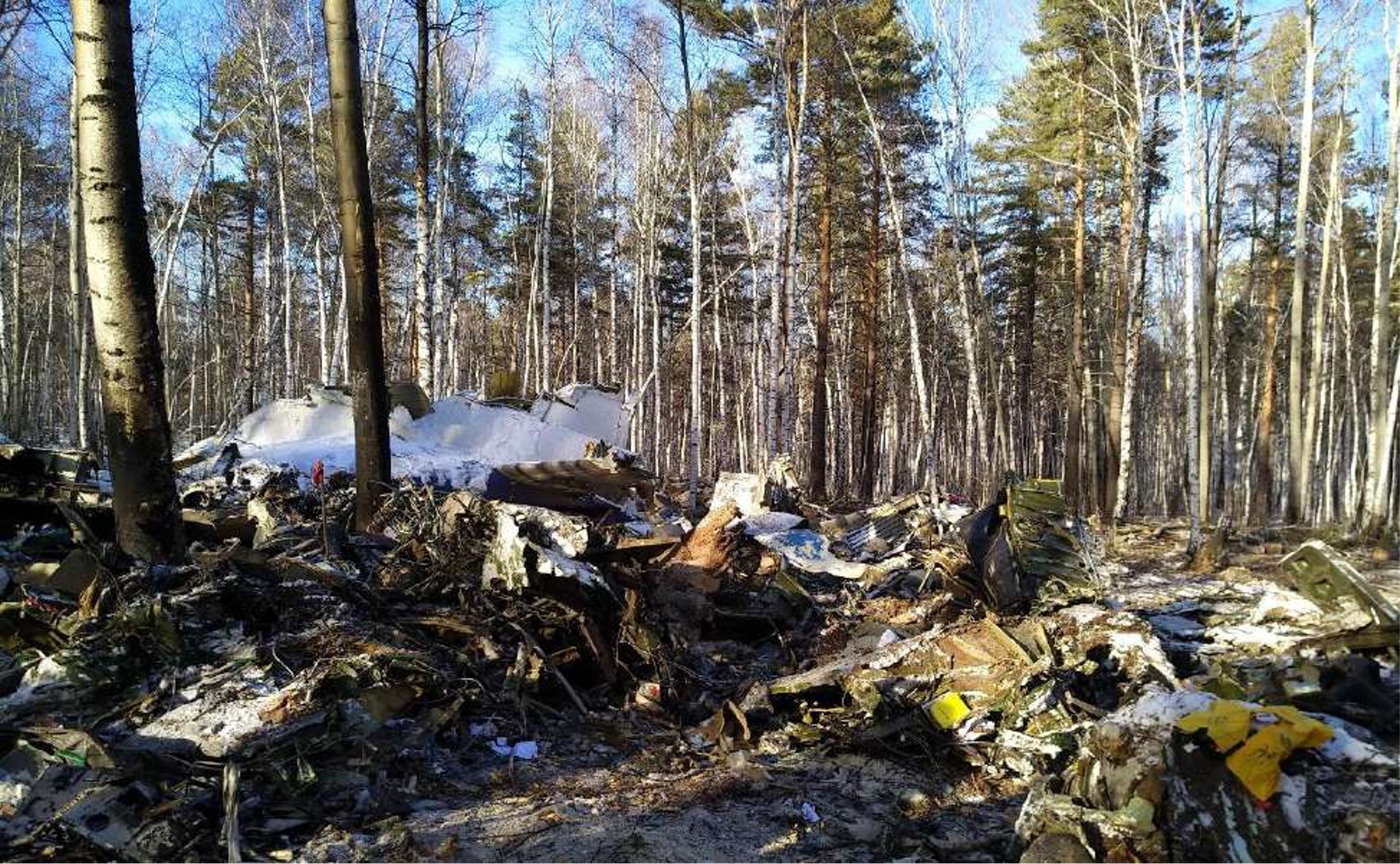
- Wreckage of the aircraft at the accident site

Accident
- Date: 3 November 2021
- Summary: CFIT during go-around
- Site: Near International Airport Irkutsk, Russia

Aircraft
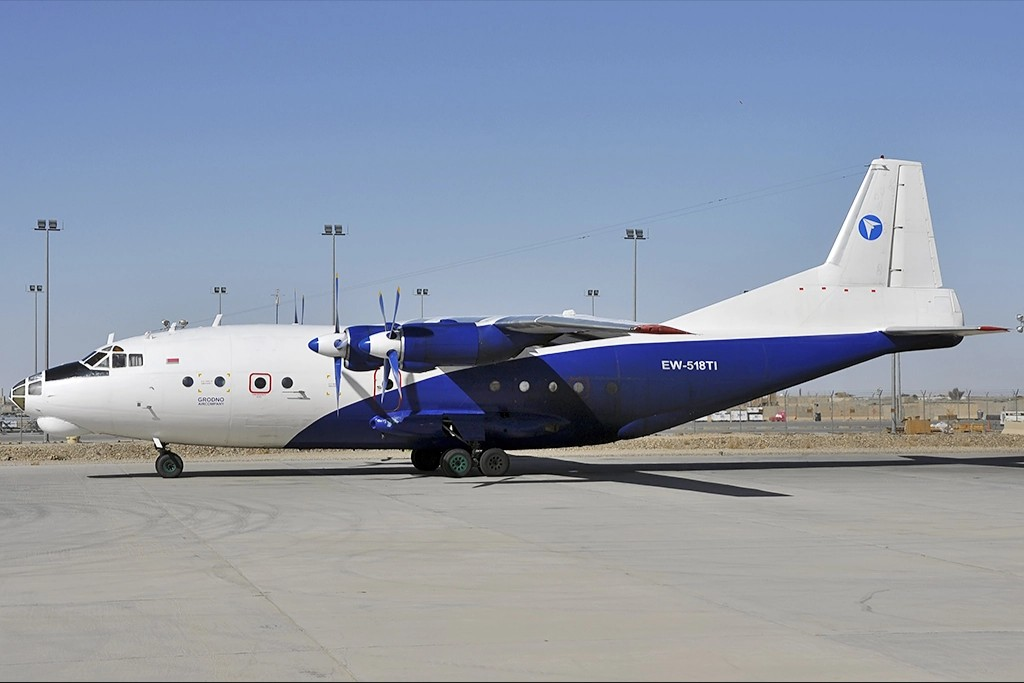
- The aircraft involved (EW-518TI) in 2019
- Aircraft type: Antonov An-12BK
- Operator: Grodno Aviakompania
- Registration: EW-518TI
- Flight origin: Yakutsk Airport
- Stopover: Ugolny Airport
- Destination: International Airport Irkutsk
- Occupants: 9
- Passengers: 2
- Crew: 7
- Fatalities: 9
- Survivors: 0

Grodno Aviakompania Flight 1252 was a flight from Yakutsk to Irkutsk with a stopover at Ugolny. On November 3rd, 2021, the Antonov An-12 crashed while attempting a go-around at Irkutsk. All 9 people on board were killed. This is the first and only accident for Grodno Aviakompania.

== Flight ==
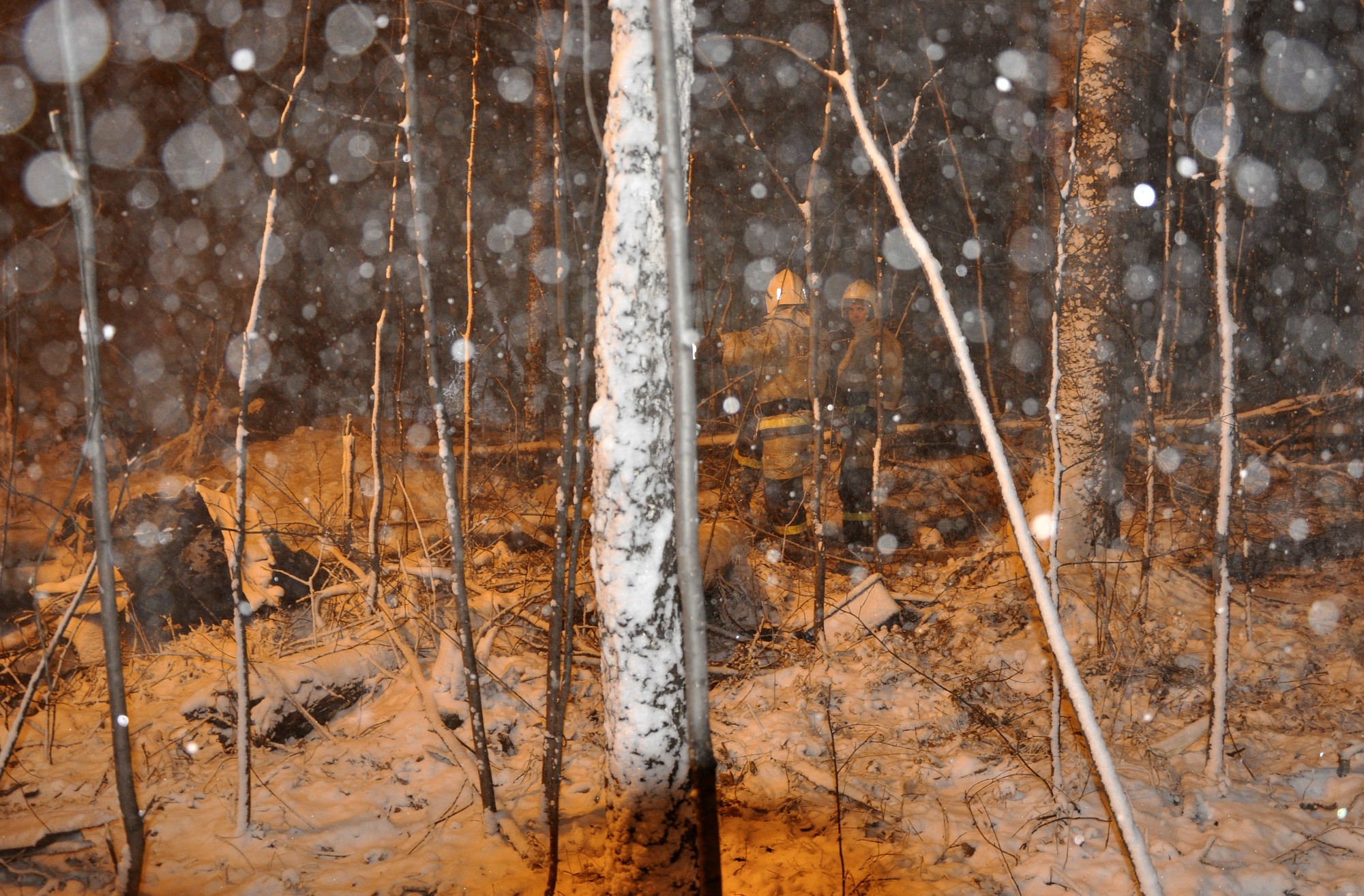
Firefighters at the site

The aircraft was an Antonov An-12BK. It was scheduled to leave from Yakutsk carrying edible items and other consumer goods. While on an approach pattern to Runway 30, the weather was poor with low visibility, snowfall and an estimated temperature of −7 °C (19 °F). Radar contact with the flight was lost at 19:45 local time. The aircraft crashed south-eastwards of Runway 30 and burst into flames. All nine people aboard were killed.

== Investigation ==
The Interstate Aviation Committee investigated the accident. The investigation report, dated April 3, 2024, concluded that the accident is a Controlled Flight Into Terrain event in night IMC. The investigation attributed insufficient training, poor CRM, incorrect configuration of navigation system, unapproved use of satellite navigation system, failure to stabilize the approach or execute go-around, failure to comply with flight manuals regarding go-around and minimums, and the failure of GPWS for unknown reasons.
