= Minsk National Airport =

International airport serving Minsk, Belarus

Minsk National Airport Нацыянальны аэрапорт Мінск

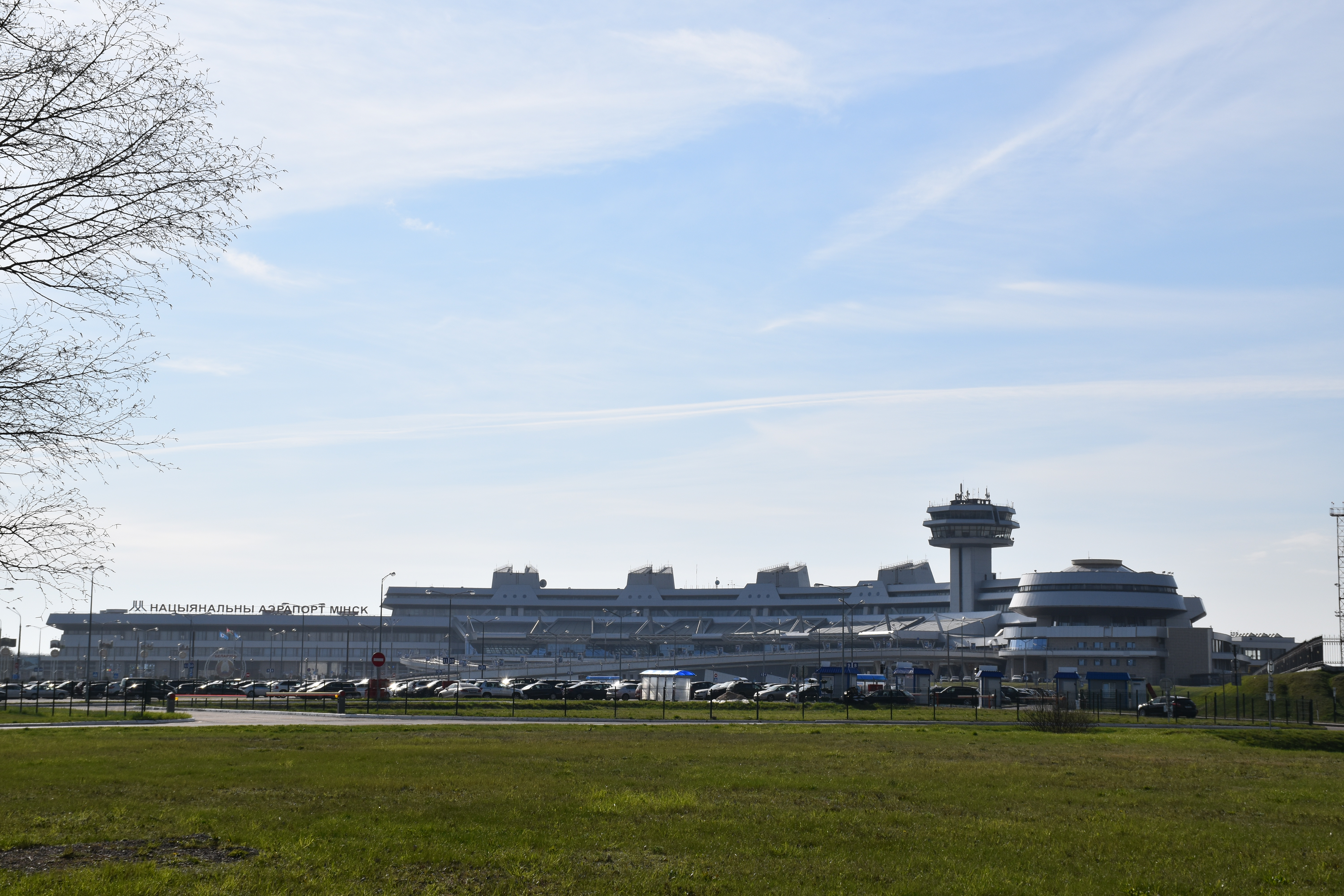
- IATA: MSQ; ICAO: UMMS

Summary
- Airport type: Public
- Serves: Minsk, Belarus
- Opened: 1 July 1983; 43 years ago
- Hub for: Belavia
- Time zone: EEST (UTC+03:00)
- Elevation AMSL: 204 m (669 ft)
- Coordinates: 53°52′57″N 28°01′57″E
- Website: airport.by

Map
- Location of airport in Belarus MSQ/UMMS (Europe)

Runways
| Direction | Length | | Surface |
| Direction | m | ft | Surface |
|---|---|---|---|
| 13R/31L | 3,641 | 11,942 | Concrete |
| 13L/31R | 3,700 | 12,139 | Concrete |

Statistics (2023)
- Passengers: 2,497,631
- Sources: ACI's 2014 World Airport Traffic Report.

Minsk National Airport (Belarusian: Нацыянальны аэрапорт Мінск, romanized: Natsyyanalny aeraport Minsk, [natsɨjaˈnalʲnɨ aeraˈport mʲinsk]; Russian: Национальный аэропорт Минск) (IATA: MSQ, ICAO: UMMS), formerly known as Minsk-2, is the main international airport in Belarus, located 42 km (26 mi) to the east of the capital Minsk. It geographically lies in the territory of Smalyavichy Raion but is administratively subordinated to the Kastrychnitski District of Minsk. The airport serves as hub of the Belarusian flag carrier Belavia and the cargo carriers TAE Avia, Genex, and Rubystar Airways.

== History ==
=== Early years ===
Construction of Minsk-2 airport began in 1977. In 1979, a new runway 3,640 m (11,942 ft 3 in) long and 60 m (196 ft 10 in) wide became operational. By 1981, the Minsk-2 aerodrome was able to handle aircraft and the airport opened in 1982. The first passenger flight was operated with a Tupolev Tu-134.

On 1 July 1983, the Second Joint Aviation Division of Minsk was established in accordance with the decision of the Ministry of Civil Aviation of USSR. This date is considered as the airport foundation day.

=== Development since the 1990s ===
Regular flights began in 1983; by 1990 passenger traffic reached 2.2 million passengers. From 1991, the number of flights began to decline due to the dissolution of the Soviet Union and other consequent changes. By 1997, the number of the passengers was 516,000, in 1998 – 480,000, in 2000 – only 400,000 passengers. Since the collapse of the Soviet Union, the first million passengers were handled by Minsk National Airport in 2008. Due to the substantial growth in passenger traffic, 2008 became a significant mark for the airport. In May 2019, a second runway, 13L/31R was opened.

In 2020, the growth was stalled by the COVID-19 pandemic in 2020. Additionally from May 2021 all Belarusian airlines, mainly Belavia, have been banned from operating into the European Union as part of newly established sanctions after the Ryanair Flight 4978 incident. Likewise, several European airlines cancelled their Minsk services over the conflict, e.g., Lufthansa.

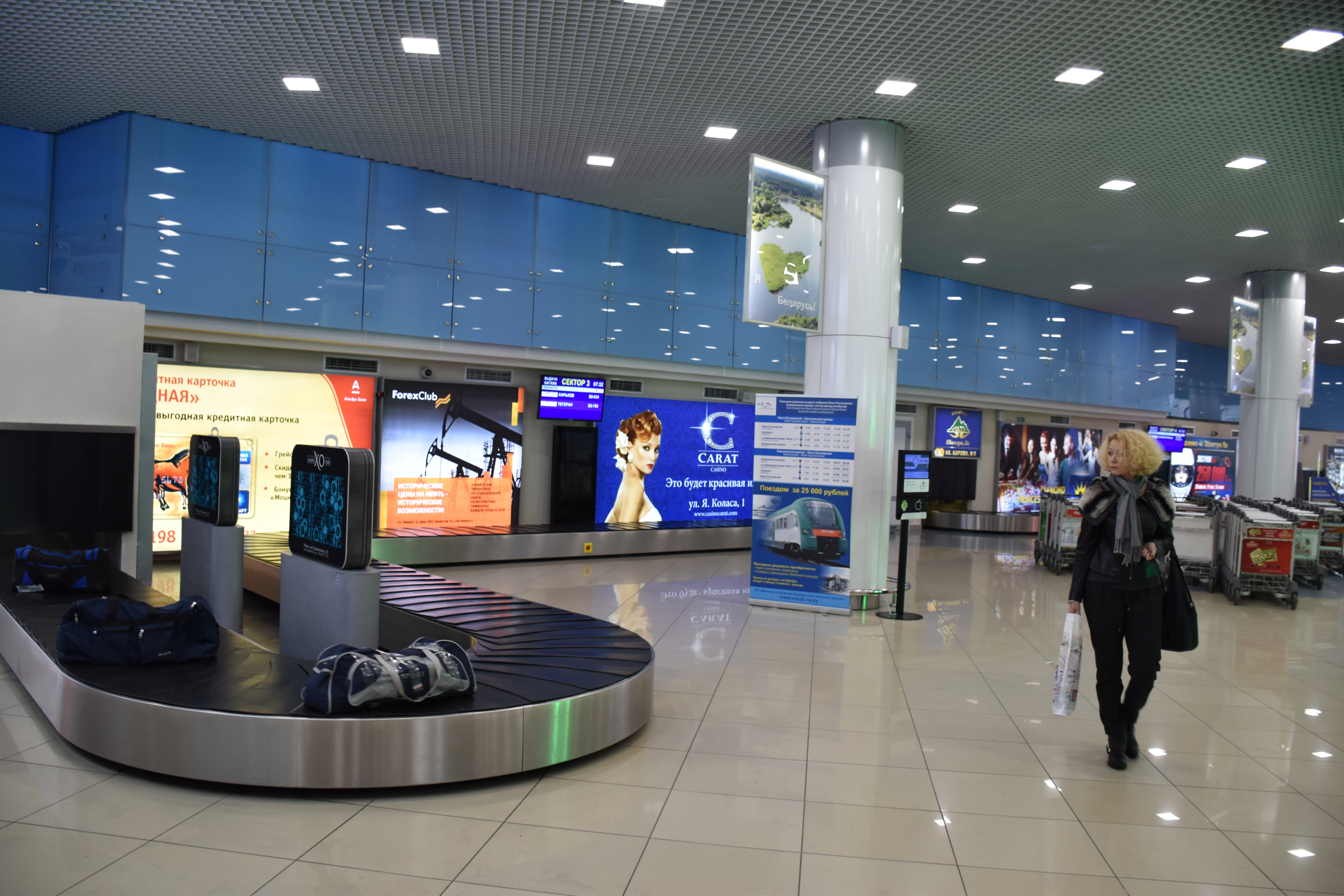
Interiors of Minsk National Airport. 1st floor. Baggage Dispensing Area. Baggage carousel.

On 9 August 2021, the US added the airport director Vyacheslav Khoroneko to the SDN list.

==== Role in the 2021 border crisis ====
In 2021, the airport became a major hub for illegal migration to the European Union. It was reported that several fly-by-night companies and two travel agencies got full access to the international zone of the airport and started to offer agent services for arrived migrants issuing visas on arrival. It was noted that these companies enjoyed the patronage of the airport staff and authorities, while other travel agencies were not allowed to provide similar services for real tourists.

The situation also affected airlines serving Belarus. Due to ongoing crisis Cham Wings Airlines terminated their flights from Damascus on short notice, stating they cannot distinguish between regular travellers and illegal migrants. In the same time, Turkish Airlines amongst others stopped selling tickets to Minsk to passengers with certain nationalities, e. g. from Yemen and Iraq after the European Union threatened sanctions against airlines which (unknowingly) participate in illegal migration. Belavia has also ceased ticket sales to certain nationals for flights from Turkish airports to Belarus upon the Turkish government's decision to support the European Union regarding the recent events. The same applies to all flights from Uzbekistan and Dubai, whose governments announced similar guidelines.

== Terminal ==
Boeing 737 boarding at MSQ

Minsk National Airport consists of one slightly-curved, four-story passenger terminal building originally built in the style of brutalist architecture, which has since been modernized and expanded. The ground floor features the arrivals area while the second floor consists of the check-in hall with 43 counters and 13 departure gates, some of which are equipped with jet bridges. The airside area features the usual duty free shops, an airport lounge, and other passenger amenities as well as a Burger King franchise. The first and third floors are mainly used for administration and maintenance.

== Airlines and destinations ==
Many airlines have suspended flights to Minsk due to the ongoing Russo-Ukrainian war. The following airlines operate regular scheduled and charter flights to and from Minsk:

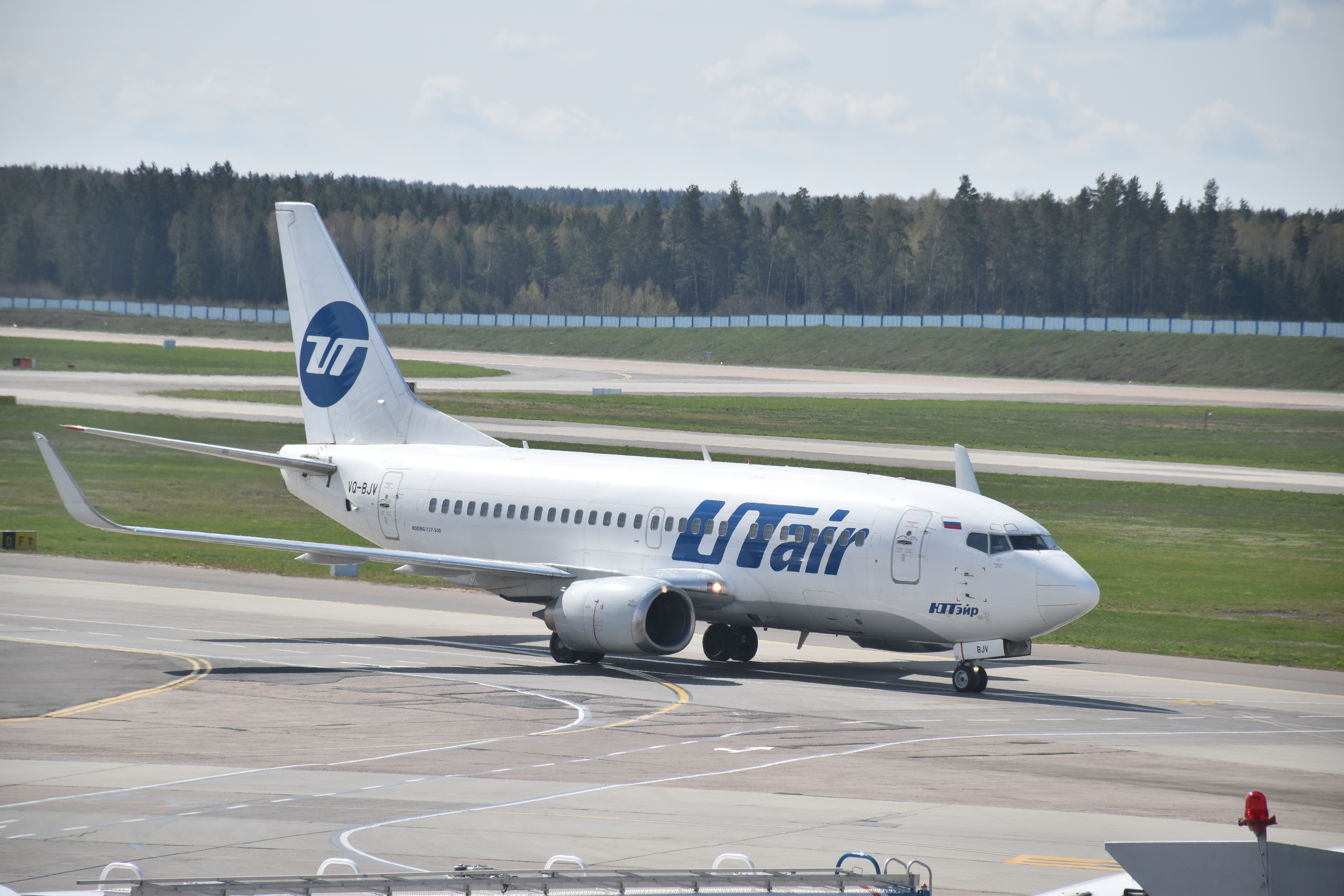
UTair Boeing 737-524 taxiing at Minsk National Airport

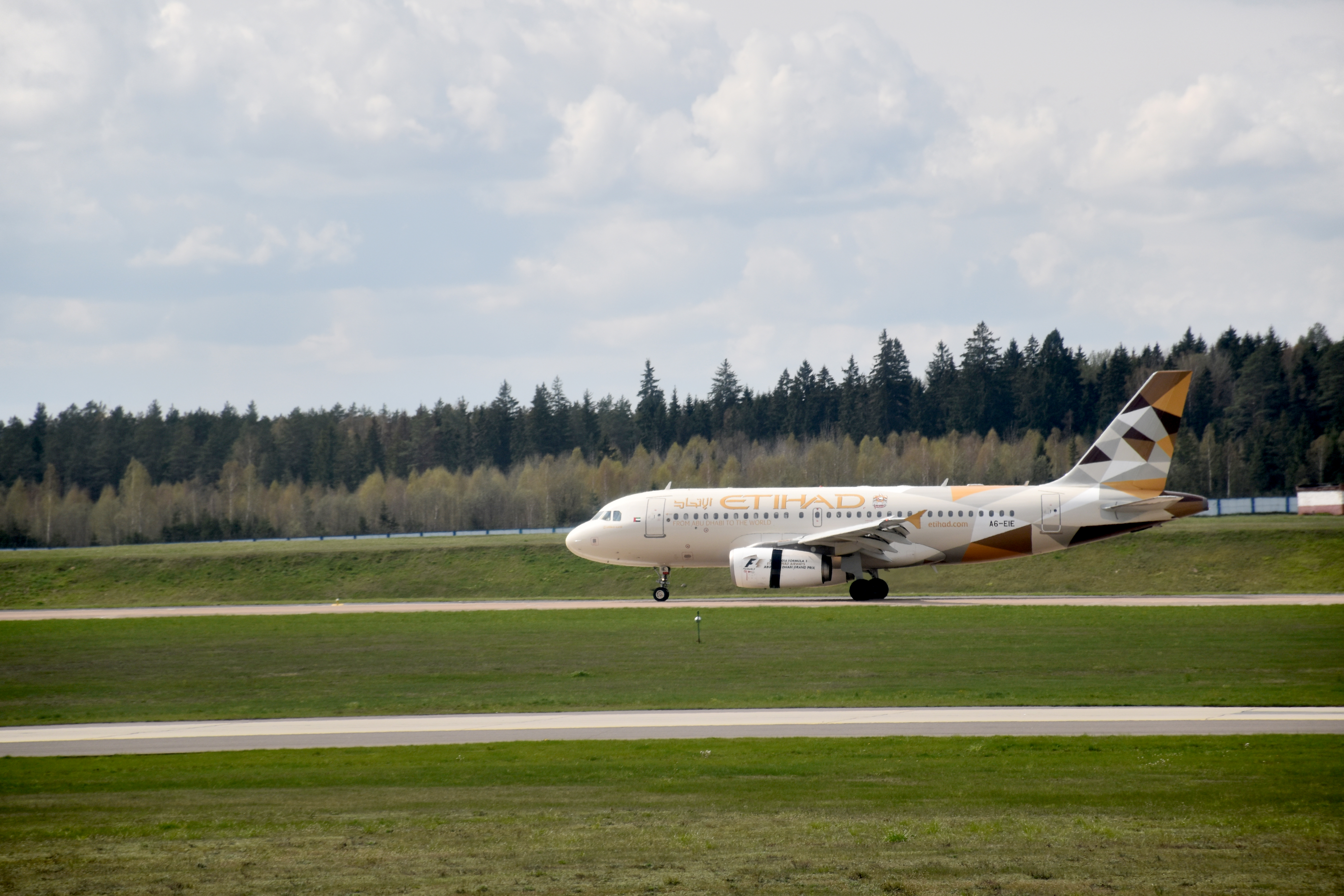
Etihad Airways Airbus A319-100 landing at Minsk National Airport

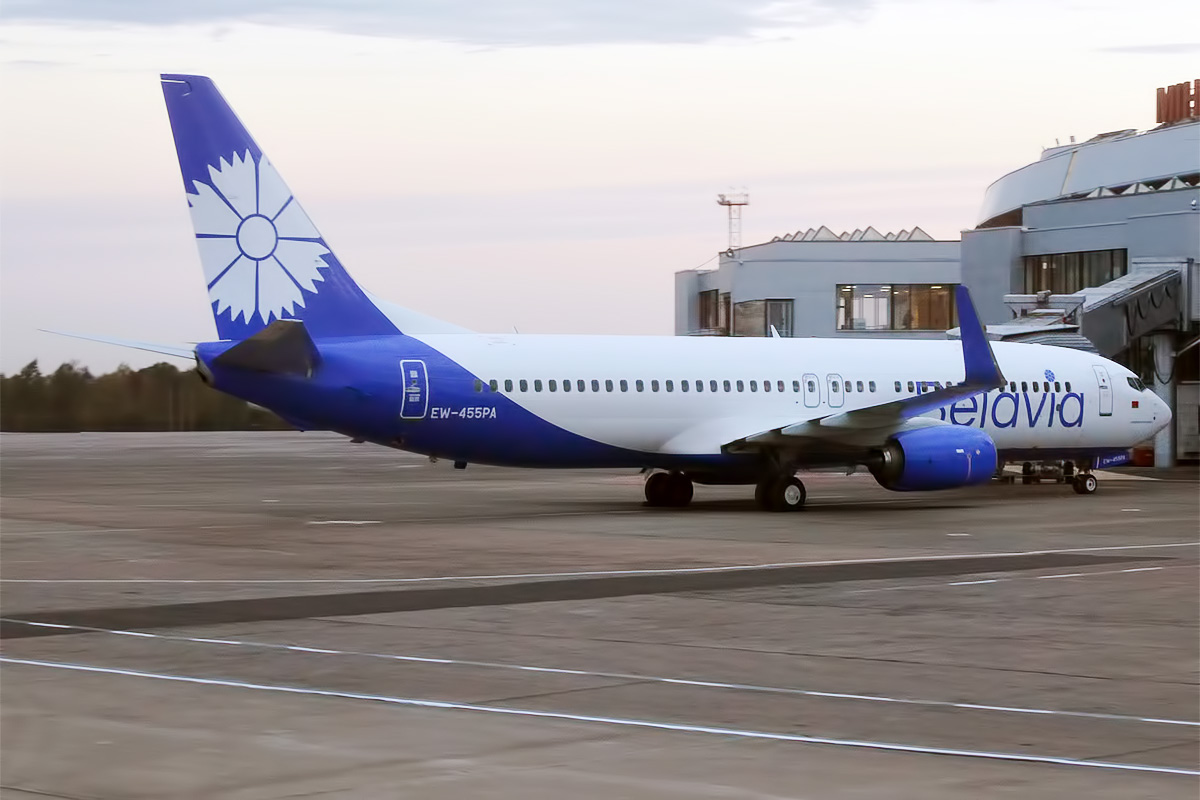
Belavia Boeing 737-8ZM

| Airlines | Destinations |
|---|---|
| Aeroflot | Cheboksary, Moscow–Sheremetyevo, Nizhny Novgorod |
| Air China | Beijing–Capital, Xi'an |
| Azimuth | Mineralnye Vody |
| Belavia | Almaty, Astana, Baku, Batumi, Bangkok–Suvarnabhumi, Delhi, Dubai–International, Istanbul, Kazan, Kaliningrad, Kutaisi, Moscow–Domodedovo, Moscow–Sheremetyevo, Moscow–Vnukovo, Moscow-Zhukovsky, Saint Petersburg, Sochi, Tashkent, Tel Aviv, Tbilisi, Türkmenbaşy, Ufa, Ürümqi, Yekaterinburg, Yerevan; Seasonal: Makhachkala, Murmansk; Seasonal charter: Antalya, Bodrum, Da Nang, Enfidha, Hambantota–Mattala, El Alamein, Hurghada, İzmir, Nha Trang, Phu Quoc, Sanya, Sharm El Sheikh, Pattaya, Phuket |
| Flydubai | Dubai–International |
| Pobeda | Moscow–Vnukovo, Saint Petersburg |
| Red Wings Airlines | Arkhangelsk–Talagi, Chelyabinsk, Moscow-Zhukovsky, Perm, Samara, Ufa, Ulyanovsk–Baratayevka |
| SCAT Airlines | Almaty |
| Severstal Avia | Cherepovets; Seasonal: Petrozavodsk |
| Somon Air | Dushanbe |
| Turkish Airlines | Istanbul |
| Uzbekistan Airways | Tashkent |
| VietJet Air | Seasonal charter: Da Nang |

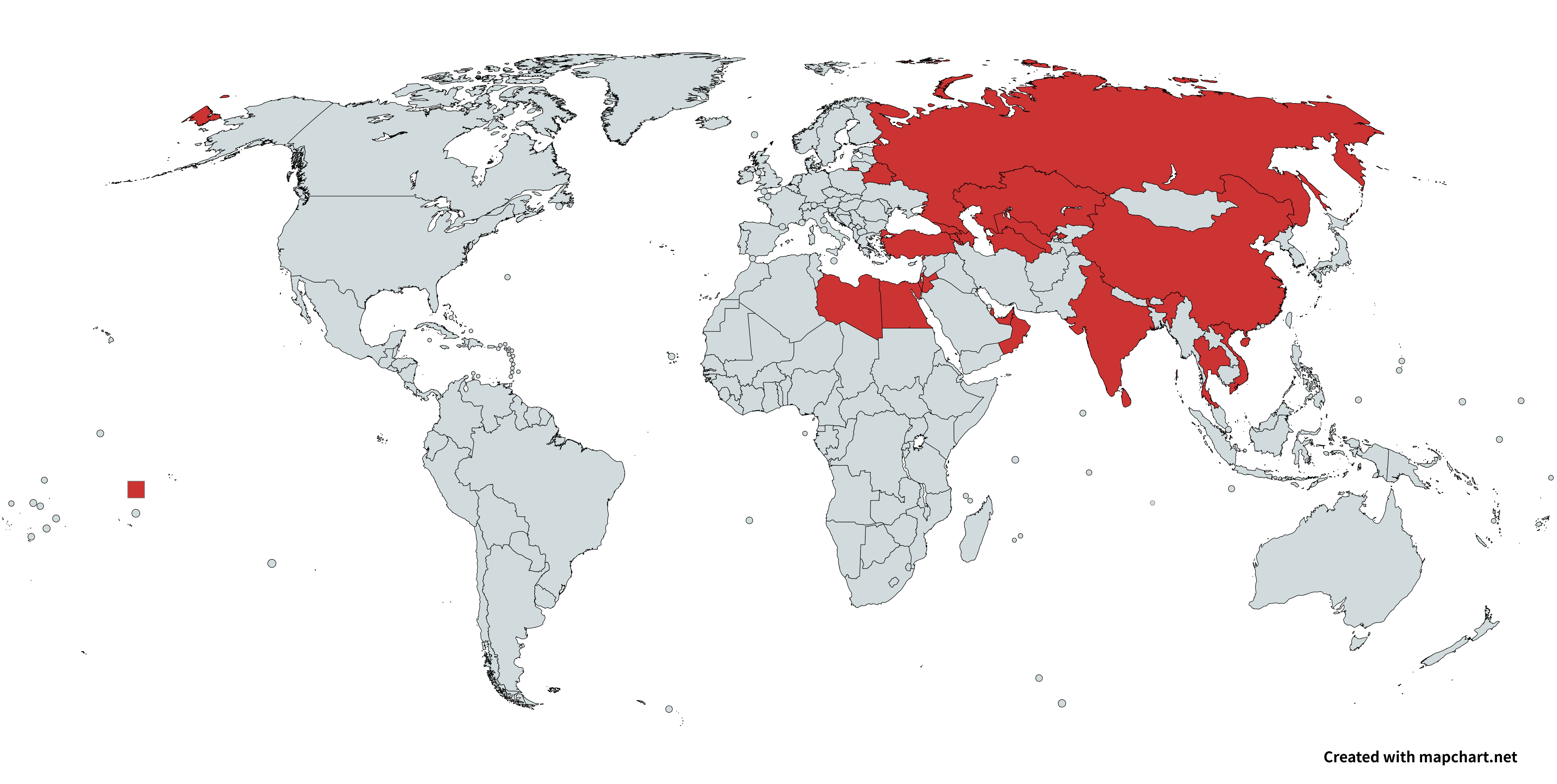
As of February 2026.

== Statistics ==
Traffic by calendar year, official ACI statistics
| | Passengers | Change from previous year | Aircraft operations | Change from previous year | Cargo (metric tons) | Change from previous year |
|---|---|---|---|---|---|---|
| 2005 | 559,114 | ▲10.86% | 5,456 | ▲2.83% | 5,488 | ▲4.29% |
| 2006 | 637,560 | ▲14.03% | 6,144 | ▲12.61% | 6,059 | ▲10.40% |
| 2007 | 830,481 | ▲30.26% | 7,590 | ▲23.54% | 7,290 | ▲20.32% |
| 2008 | 1,010,695 | ▲21.70% | 9,256 | ▲21.95% | 7,870 | ▲7.96% |
| 2009 | 1,028,886 | ▲1.80% | 9,341 | ▲0.92% | 7,289 | ▼7.38% |
| 2010 | 1,285,423 | ▲24.93% | 11,020 | ▲17.97% | 8,553 | ▲17.34% |
| 2011 | 1,437,825 | ▲11.86% | 13,686 | ▲24.19% | 8,667 | ▲1.33% |
| 2012 | 1,837,911 | ▲27.83% | 14,947 | ▲9.27% | 9,833 | ▲13.45% |
| 2013 | 2,182,177 | ▲18.73% | 16,586 | ▲11.00% | 10,477 | ▲6.55% |
| 2014 | 2,593,559 | ▲18.90% | 20,036 | ▲20.90% | 19,905 | ▲89.99% |
| 2015 | 2,782,866 | ▲7.30% | 20,365 | ▲1.64% | 16,509 | ▼17.10% |
| 2016 | 3,429,122 | ▲23.20% | 23,034 | ▲13.10% | 17,460 | ▲5.76% |
| 2017 | 4,114,512 | ▲20.00% | 24,508 | ▲6.40% | 18,465 | ▲5.75% |
| 2018 | 4,536,618 | ▲10.30% | 26 082 | ▲6.60% | 20,217 | ▲10.60% |
| 2019 | 5,101,766 | ▲12.50% | 28,417 | ▲8.90% | N.D. | N.D. |
| 2020 | 1,939,192 | ▼62.00% | 13,292 | ▼53.20% | N.D. | N.D. |
| 2022 | ~2,065,000 | | | | | |
| 2023 | 2,497,631 | ▲20% | | | | |
Source: Airports Council International. World Airport Traffic Reports (Years 2005, 2006, 2007, 2009, 2011, 2012, 2013, and 2014); Official website (Years 2015--2020).

== Ground transportation ==
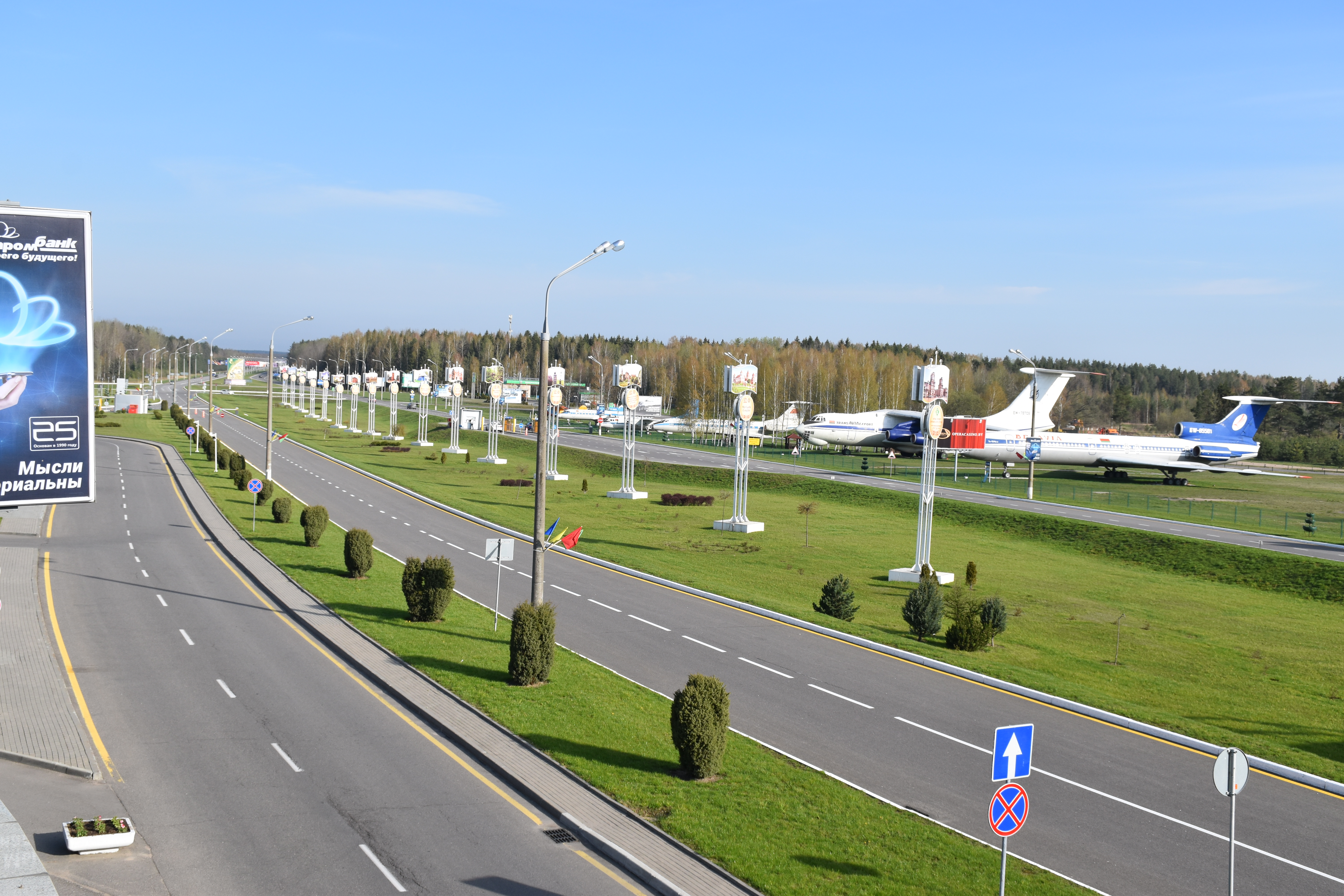
View of M2 highway near Minsk National Airport.

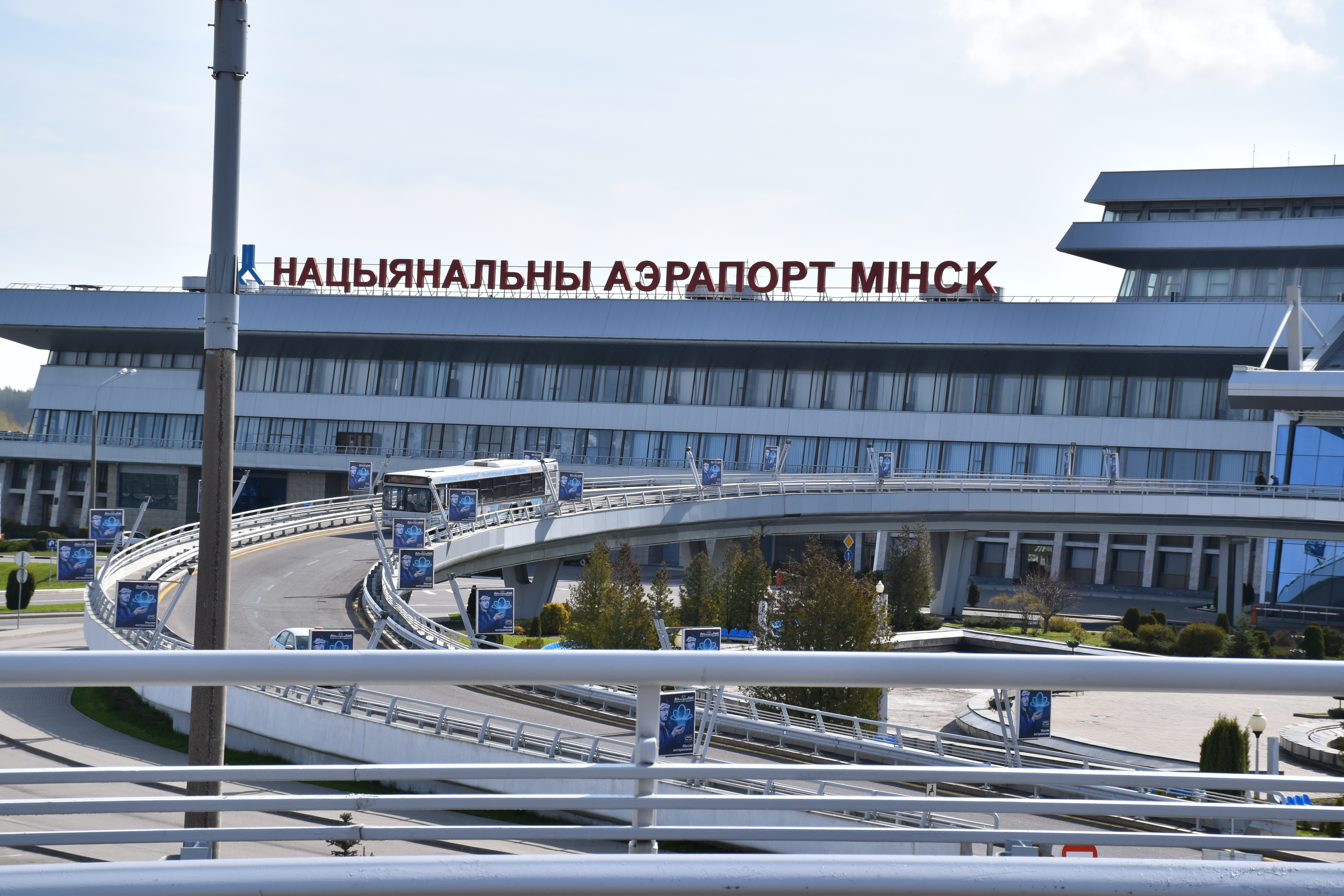
Minsk National Airport overpass

The airport is located 42 km (26 mi) east of Minsk, and is linked with the city with a toll-free (for non-BY registered cars) highway. Free short term parking is available in front of the terminal. Minsk National Airport is linked to the capital by the M2 motorway. Bus, train, taxi and parking services are provided. The airport is served by buses 300Э and 173Э departing from Centralny bus station. From the airport to Minsk, shuttle bus 1400-TK and 1430-ТК operates.

=== Railway ===
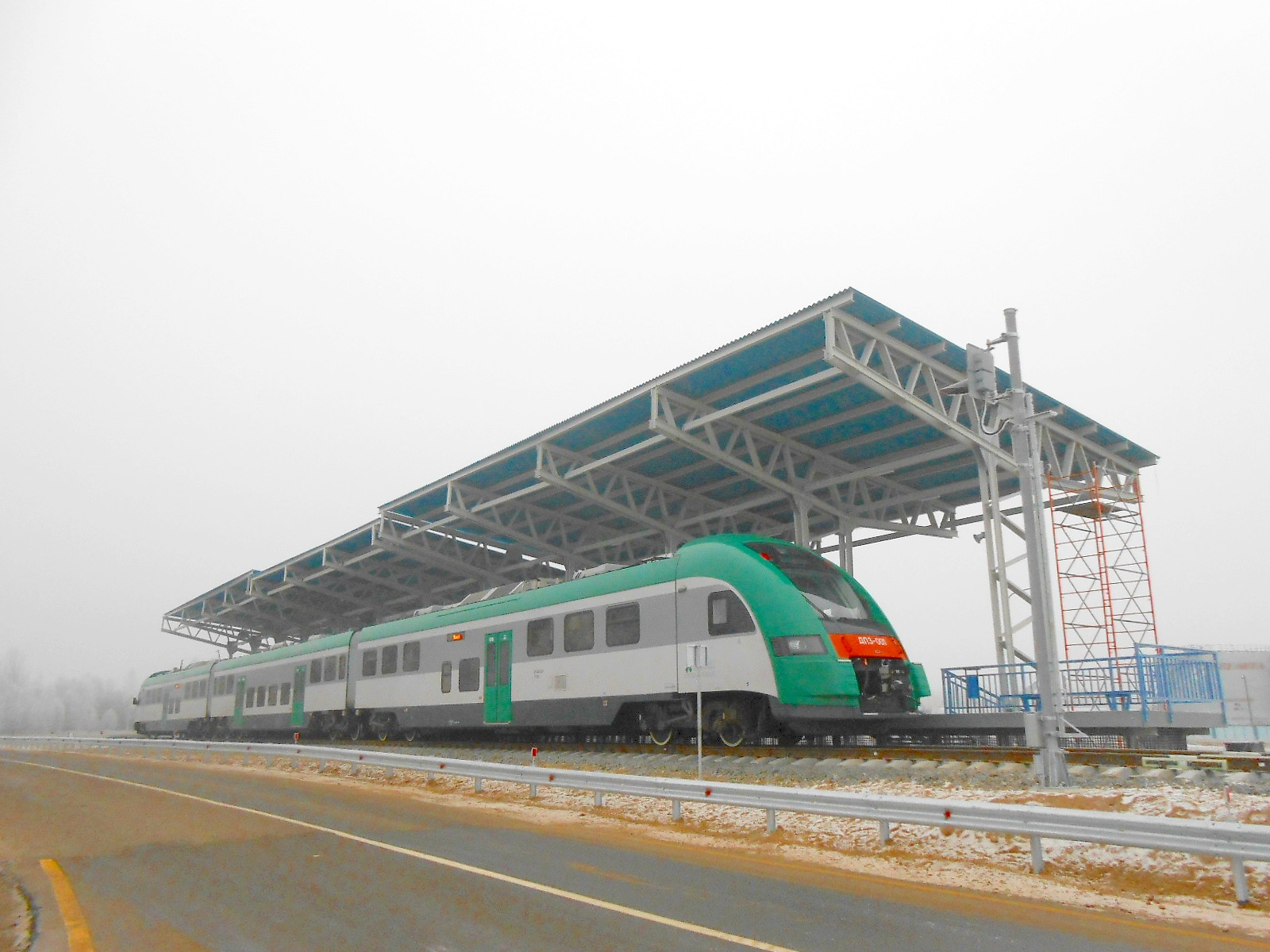
: Pesa 730M (DP3) at Minsk National Airport railway station

From November 7, 2014 to April 6, 2017, a railway connection operated. The railway platform was within walking distance of the terminal, but free shuttle buses transported passengers from the train to the terminal. On the route from Minsk to the airport, the train made one intermediate stop at the Smalyavichy station to change its direction.

In April 2017, due to the construction of the second runway, the existing stopping point Minsk National Airport was dismantled — as of April 7, diesel train service was suspended indefinitely. Initially, it was planned to shorten the route to the nearby Šemietava station and transfer passengers from the diesel train to buses there, but eventually, the decision was made to cancel the train service altogether.

== Incidents and accidents ==
- On 1 February 1985, Aeroflot Flight 7841, a Tupolev Tu-134AK operated by Aeroflot with registration number CCCP-65910 en route to Leningrad Pulkovo airport, crashed into the forest shortly after takeoff, killing 55 out of 73 passengers and three out of seven crew members on board.
- On 6 September 2003, an aircraft Tu-154 operated by an Iranian airline Kish Air hit trees in heavy fog as it was on approach en route from Tehran to Copenhagen. None of the 38 passengers and 4 crew members on board were injured.
- On 26 October 2009, a BAe 125 executive jet RA-02807 crashed on approach to Minsk National Airport. All three crew and both passengers died.
- On 23 May 2021, Ryanair Flight 4978, operated using a Boeing 737-8AS with 171 passengers on board, traveling in Belarusian airspace en route from Athens to Vilnius, was intercepted by a Belarusian MiG-29 just before it reached Lithuanian airspace. The MiG forced the plane to land at Minsk National Airport. Upon landing, the Belarusian KGB arrested two of the passengers, opposition activist Roman Protasevich and his girlfriend Sofia Sapega. The other passengers were allowed to reboard the plane to depart for Vilnius after seven hours.

== See also ==
- List of the busiest airports in the former USSR
