= Aeroflot Flight 7841 =

Soviet passenger flight involved in a 1985 aviation accident

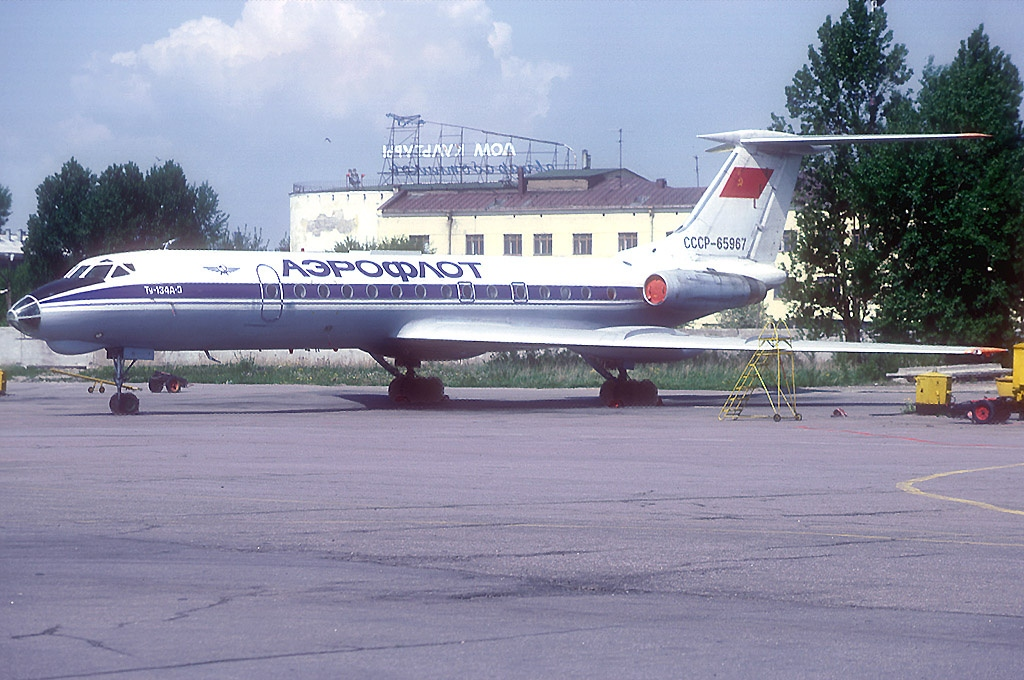
- Soviet Aeroflot Tupolev Tu-134A, similar to that involved in the accident

Occurrence
- Date: 1 February 1985
- Summary: Double engine failure, due to ice ingestion
- Site: Minsk-2 International Airport (MSQ/UMMS), Byelorussian SSR; 53°52′44.76″N 28°11′42.36″E

Aircraft
- Aircraft type: Tupolev Tu-134A
- Operator: Aeroflot
- Registration: CCCP-65910
- Flight origin: Minsk-2 International Airport (MSQ/UMMS), Byelorussian SSR
- Destination: Leningrad-Pulkovo Airport (LED/ULLI) Russian SSR
- Occupants: 80
- Passengers: 74
- Crew: 6
- Fatalities: 58
- Survivors: 22

Aeroflot Flight 7841 was a scheduled domestic passenger flight from Minsk in Soviet Byelorussia (now Belarus), to Leningrad (now known as Saint Petersburg), operated by a Tupolev Tu-134A on 1 February 1985, which suffered a double engine failure immediately after takeoff. The pilots were unable to return to Minsk, and instead made a forced landing into a forest, killing 58 of the 80 people on board, while 22 others (including three crew members) survived the accident. The double engine failure was brought on by ice ingestion.

== Aircraft ==
The Tupolev Tu-134A, registration number CCCP-65910, involved in the accident was manufactured on 11 May 1982 and had 448 completed flight cycles prior to the accident, having entered service on 8 June 1982.

== Crash ==
Six seconds after takeoff, at an altitude of 35 metres (115 ft) and with a speed of 325 km/h (175 kn; 202 mph), a rapid loss of power occurred in the left engine, accompanied by unusual noises ("pops") and a drop in exhaust gas temperature. The pilots levelled the wings and continued climbing, with the co-pilot reporting the engine failure to air traffic control, and requesting an immediate return to the airport. At 65 seconds after takeoff, after another loud noise, an excessive vibration alarm indicated problems with the right engine. Almost immediately afterwards, the right engine failed with the aircraft at an altitude of 240 metres (790 ft). In an attempt to retain speed and maintain control, the captain put the aircraft into a shallow dive with a vertical speed of 7 metres per second (23 ft/s). The aircraft emerged from low cloud towards a forest, with some trees up to 30 m in height. At an altitude of 22 m (72 ft), the aircraft began hitting the tree tops. The aircraft sustained major damage as it reached the ground, where it burst into flames except for the tail section. Of those on board, 58 were killed, but 22 survived with injuries, including both pilots.

The crash site was located 10 kilometres (6.2 mi; 5.4 nmi) east of Minsk National Airport, and was reached by search groups after three hours.

== Investigation ==
The investigation concluded that both engines failed due to ice ingestion, which led to compressor stall, destruction of the compressors and over-temperature of the turbine blades. Citing significant damage to the aircraft and engines, the investigators were unable to determine where the ice came from.
